= Waco metropolitan area =

Metropolitan area in Texas, United States

Coordinates: 31°33′N 97°9′W

The Waco, TX Metropolitan Statistical Area, as defined by the U.S. Office of Management and Budget (OMB), is a metropolitan area consisting of McLennan, Falls and Bosque counties in Central Texas, anchored by the city of Waco. As of the 2020 census, the metropolitan statistical area had a population of 295,782. The population was estimated at 308,807 in 2025.

== History ==
When Standard Metropolitan Areas (predecessors of today's Metropolitan Statistical Areas) were introduced by the Bureau of the Budget (now the OMB) in 1950, the Waco SMA was defined as solely consisting of McLennan County. Falls County was added to the statistical area in 2013. Bosque County was added in 2023, giving the MSA its current three-county form.

== Counties ==
County	Seat	2025 estimate	2020 Census	Change	Area	Density
McLennan	Waco	272,020	260,579	+4.39%	1,060 sq mi (2,745 km^{2})	257/sq mi (99/km^{2})
Bosque	Meridian	18,918	18,235	+3.75%	1,003 sq mi (2,598 km^{2})	19/sq mi (7/km^{2})
Falls	Marlin	17,869	16,968	+5.31%	774 sq mi (2,005 km^{2})	23/sq mi (9/km^{2})
Total		308,807	295,782	+4.40%	2,837 sq mi (7,348 km^{2})	109/sq mi (42/km^{2})

== Communities ==
=== Incorporated places ===
==== McLennan ====
- City of Bellmead
- City of Beverly Hills
- City of Bruceville-Eddy (partial)
- Town of Crawford
- City of Gholson
- City of Golinda (partial)
- City of Hallsburg
- City of Hewitt
- City of Lacy Lakeview
- City of Leroy
- City of Lorena
- City of Mart
- City of McGregor (partial)
- City of Moody
- City of Riesel
- City of Robinson
- City of Ross
- City of Valley Mills (partial)
- City of Waco (Principal city)
- City of West
- City of Woodway

==== Falls ====
- City of Bruceville-Eddy (partial)
- City of Golinda (partial)
- City of Lott
- City of Marlin
- City of Rosebud

==== Bosque ====
- City of Clifton
- City of Meridian
- City of Valley Mills (partial)
- City of Walnut Springs

=== Unincorporated places ===
==== McLennan ====
- Axtell
- China Spring
- Elm Mott
- Speegleville
- Downsville
- Asa

==== Falls ====
- Barclay
- Cedar Springs
- Cego
- Chilton
- Durango
- Highbank
- Mooreville
- Otto
- Perry
- Reagan
- Satin
- Tomlinson Hill
- Travis
- Westphalia
- Zipperlandville

== See also ==
- Texas census statistical areas
