= Texas State Highway 7 =

State highway in Texas

State Highway 7
- SH 7 highlighted in red; business routes in blue

Route information
- Maintained by TxDOT
- Length: 212.670 mi (342.259 km)
- Existed: April 4, 1917–present

Major junctions
- West end: I-35 in Eddy
- US 77 in Chilton; SH 6 in Marlin; US 79 in Marquez; I-45 in Centerville; US 287 in Crockett; US 69 in Pollok; Future I-69 / US 59 in Nacogdoches; US 96 in Center
- East end: Future I-69 / US 84 in Joaquin

Location
- Country: United States
- State: Texas
- Counties: McLennan, Falls, Limestone, Leon, Houston, Angelina, Nacogdoches, Shelby

Highway system
- Highways in Texas; Interstate; US; State; Former; Toll; Loops; Spurs; FM/RM; Park; Rec
← RE 6	→ Loop 7

State Highway 7 (SH 7) is an east–west state highway in the U.S. state of Texas that runs from Interstate 35 at Eddy to U.S. Highway 84 about 3 miles (4.8 km) west of the Louisiana state line. Between Crockett and Nacogdoches, SH 7 passes through the Davy Crockett National Forest. Commissioned on April 4, 1917, SH 7 is one of the original state highways established in Texas, and has been re-routed several times since its original conception. In earlier years, SH 7 mostly followed present day U.S. Highway 84, U.S. Highway 67, U.S. Highway 70 among other highways between northwest Texas and the Louisiana state line. By 1939, most of the mileage belonging to SH 7 was transferred to the U.S. Highway System, leaving the highway extant only within eastern Texas. SH 7 subsequently went through several other major reroutings, truncations and extensions between 1939 and 1990, before becoming the highway it is today.

== Route description ==
Including concurrencies with other state highways, Texas State Highway 7 (SH 7) reaches a total length of 213.910 miles (344.255 km) between Interstate 35 (I-35) and Farm to Market Road 107 (FM 107) at Bruceville-Eddy and a junction with U.S. Highway 84 (US 84) near the Louisiana state line. The highway travels through mostly flat, rural landscape, that lies between the Dallas-Fort Worth area and Houston. The highway also passes several small rivers, retaining dams and man made reservoirs, as well as cutting through the Davy Crockett National Forest and passing the northern boundary of the Sabine National Forest. SH 7 currently serves nine counties and nine incorporated towns and cities.

=== Bruceville-Eddy to Nacogdoches ===
SH 7 begins at an interchange with I-35 and FM 107 at Bruceville-Eddy in McLennan County. The highway proceeds due east crossing the Falls County line less than a mile east of the I-35 interchange. About 6.5 miles (10.461 km) east of I-35, SH 7 intersects with the southern terminus of FM 2643. Just outside of Chilton, SH 7 meets US 77 and Business SH 7-B at an interchange. Where the highway continues straight ahead as the business route, SH 7 proper becomes concurrent with US 77, passing the eastern terminus of FM 1950, then splitting off on its own again, continuing east where US 77 continues south towards Victoria. SH 7 meets up with the eastern terminus of Bus. SH 7-B in Chilton as well as the southern terminus of FM 434. The highway heads east, passing the eastern terminus of FM 935 and SH 320 near Triangle, then crosses over the Brazos River on a bridge.

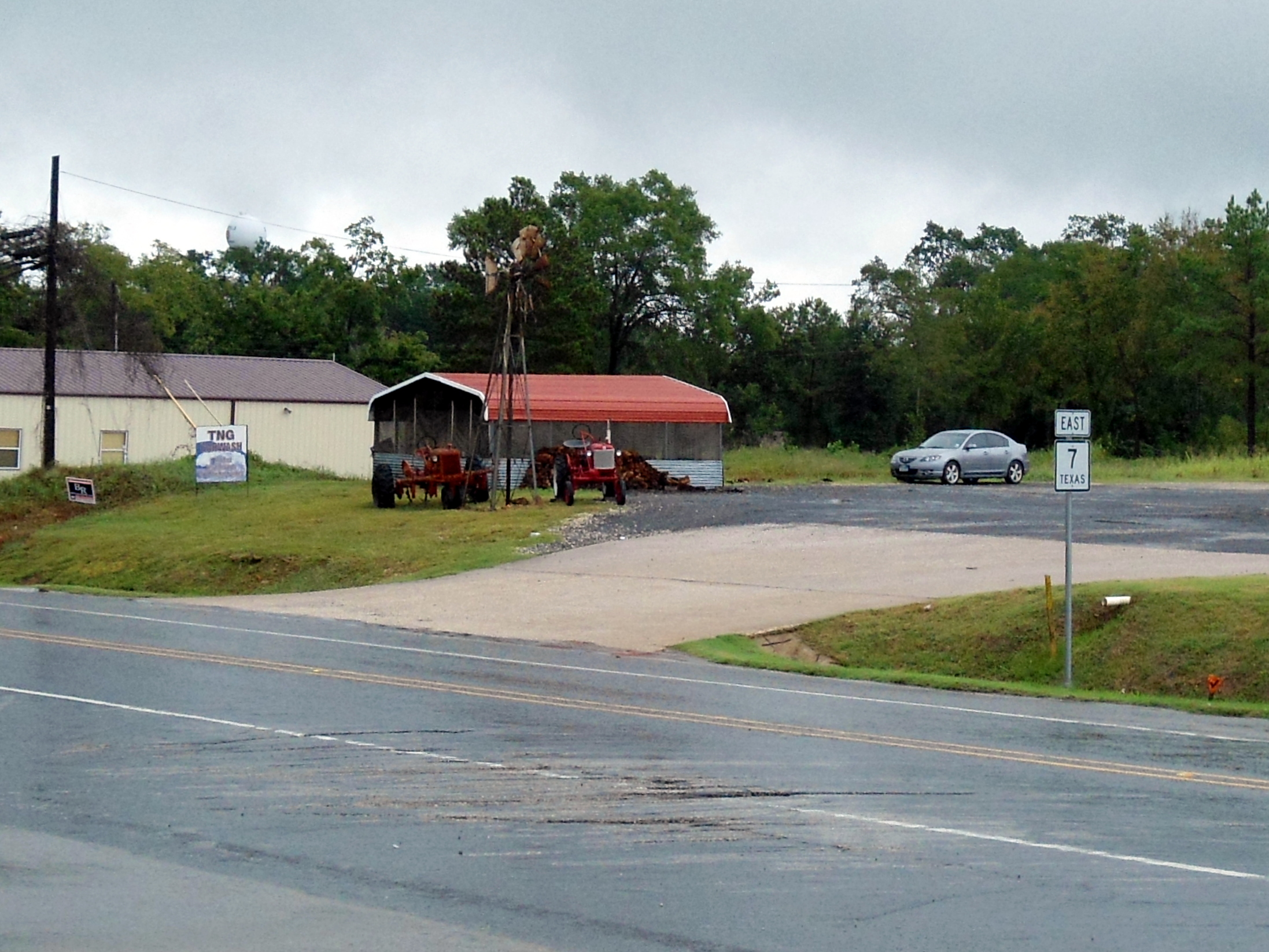
SH 7 runs east in Centerville

East of the river, SH 7 enters the town of Marlin, passing an intersection with Bus. SH 6-N at Williams Street and Craig Street. Further into town, SH 7 passes the southern terminus of FM 147 at Walker Street. On the east side of town, SH 7 intersects with SH 6 at a freeway grade interchange, then proceeds east out of Marlin. Heading away from Marlin, the highway has junctions with FM 2958, FM 3144, FM 1711/1771 and FM 2745 before crossing the Limestone County. SH 7 becomes Washington Street through Kosse, meeting at a junction with SH 14 at Mignonette Street. After crossing the railroad tracks and heading east of Kosse, SH 7 intersects with the southern terminus of FM 2749 at the Kosse Mine, then crosses the Robertson County line. The highway intersects with FM 979 and FM 937 before leaving Robertson county and entering Leon County. After entering Leon County, SH 7 intersects with US 79 and Loop 208 in Marquez, then continues east crossing a set of railroad tracks. After intersecting with FM 1147, the highway then crosses another set of railroad tracks in Concord. In Robbins, SH 7 intersects with FM 39. Entering Centerville, SH 7 becomes Saint Mary's Street and intersects with I-45 at exit 164. In the center of town, SH 7 has two junctions, with SH 75 at Commerce Street and the northern terminus of FM 1119 at Cass Street. SH 7 goes straight northeast out of Centerville, passing FM 811 and FM 1511, before curving east again and passing FM 542 and crossing over a creek into Houston County. Following a junction with FM 132, SH 7 arrives at a wye intersection with SH 21. Both SH 7 and SH 21 run concurrently east, crossing Loop 304 into Crockett.

Entering Crockett, SH 7/SH 21 become Goliad Avenue and intersect with the southern terminus of FM 229. The pair of highways then crosses under some railroad tracks at Commerce Street. Both highways arrive at the Crockett town square, which is comprised by four one-way streets centered around the Houston County Courthouse. The square also acts as a junction between US 287, SH 7, SH 21 and SH 19. SH 21 and SH 7 split away from each other at the square, with SH 21 heading northeast on Houston Avenue towards Alto, while SH 7 continues east on Goliad Avenue, intersecting a second time with Loop 304 before leaving town. After passing Houston County Airport, FM 232 and FM 1733, SH 7 enters Kennard, becoming Main Street. After passing a junction with FM 2781 at Welch Street, SH 7 arrives at a wye intersection, where it turns away from Main Street, heading northeast, while Main Street continues ahead as FM 357, before turning southeast towards Apple Springs. In Ratcliff, SH 7 turns to head east again at a junction with FM 227. East of Ratcliff, the highway briefly turns northeast again, crossing over the Neches River into Angelina County. Shortly after crossing the county line, SH 7 arrives at an intersection with the western terminus of SH 103. Where the roadway continues east as SH 103 to Lufkin, SH 7 turns briefly north, then heads diagonally northeast, passing FM 1819 near Redtown and a grade separated interchange with US 69 further northeast. SH 7 then crosses the Angelina River into Nacogdoches County

=== Nacogdoches to Joaquin ===
After passing a junction with FM 2782 in Harmony, SH 7 skirts the southern edge of A.L. Mangham Junior Regional Airport and enters Nacogdoches becoming Fredonia Street, before reaching a freeway interchange with US 59, SH 21 and Loop 224. Fredonia Street continues northeast into town as Bus. SH 7-N, where SH 7 joins US 59/SH 21/Loop 224 onto Stallings Drive, bypassing downtown Nacogdoches. At the interchange with South Street, which also serves as the southern terminus of Bus. US 59-F, US 59 splits off and continues south on South Street towards Victoria and Laredo. SH 7, SH 21 and Loop 224 continue east on Stallings Drive to an intersection with FM 224 at University Drive near the Cal-Tex Lumber facility. The four highways run concurrently for about two blocks, where FM 1275 splits off, heading south on Rayburn Drive. Shortly afterwards, SH 7/SH 21/Loop 224 meets with FM 2259 at a signalized intersection with Woden Road. East of FM 2259, SH 7/SH 21/Loop 224 curves northeast, to an interchange with East Main Street, which is the eastern terminus of Bus. SH 21-P. SH 21 leaves SH 7 and Loop 224 at this point, heading southeast on Main Street towards San Augustine. SH 7 and Loop 224 continue north to an intersection with Center Highway. While serving as the eastern terminus of Bus. SH 7-N, this intersection is also where SH 7 leaves Loop 224, heading in a northeasterly direction.

Leaving Nacogdoches, SH 7 passes junctions with FM 2112, FM 2713 in Swift and a short two block concurrency with FM 95 in Martinsville, then crosses the Attoyac River, briefly entering San Augustine County, then immediately enters Shelby County. Continuing northeast, the highway intersects with FM 2913 and FM 711, then passes a signalized intersection, acting as the western terminus of Loop 500, entering Center as San Augustine Street. In town, SH 7 has a junction with US 96 at Hurst Street, before reaching Center's town square, which is constructed around the Shelby County Courthouse. The town square also serves as a major intersection with SH 87 and the southern terminus of FM 699. Heading northeast from the town Square on Cora Street and Louisiana Street, SH 7 crosses under a set of railroad tracks, passing intersections with FM 2788 at Sardis Road and Loop 500, before leaving town. On the edge of town, SH 7 passes the southern terminus of FM 1656 at Center Municipal Airport. SH 7 passes intersections with FM 2608 in James and FM 3082, arriving on the outskirts of Joaquin. After passing an intersection with FM 139 and Cunnings Street, SH 7 ends at an intersection with US 84 at a Picnic Area outside town. The highway continues northeast as US 84 across the Sabine River into Logansport, Louisiana.

== History ==
Historic SH 7

SH 7 was one of the original 25 state highways proposed on June 21, 1917, proposed as a 'Central Texas Highway.' In 1919, the routing was mostly proposed between San Angelo and Goldthwaite, but only the segment to Paint Rock was created. From Goldthwaite, the road follows U.S. Highway 84 to Waco. The remainder follows SH 164 to Personville, FM 39 to Jewett, was unbuilt between Jewett and Crockett, SH 7 then SH 103 to Lufkin, and finally onto the state line via present-day U.S. Highway 69, SH 63, and US 190. On November 20, 1917, SH 7 was rerouted along current U.S. Highway 67 to Brownwood, and U.S. Highway 84 to Waco.

Possibly due to the amount of construction necessary to build this route as proposed, on December 18, 1917, the road was rerouted via U.S. Highway 84 to Palestine, and south on U.S. Highway 287 to Crockett, following the proposed route from there. On March 20, 1918, the road was completely rerouted via current U.S. Highway 84 through Lubbock to Sweetwater. Between Sweetwater and Coleman, the road was not constructed as proposed. SH 7 returns to US 84, through Waco to Palestine, heads south on U.S. Highway 287 to Crockett, turns to Lufkin via the current SH 7, then SH 103 and finally onto Jasper and Newton via present-day U.S. Highway 69, SH 63, and US 190. The old route of SH 7 from Brownwood to San Angelo was renumbered as SH 7A.

On August 21, 1923, SH 7 had been realigned yet again, mainly due to constructions issues. The Sweetwater-Coleman road was never built, and SH 7 was rerouted over existing roads into Abilene. The road's east terminus was shortened to Long Lake. The Crockett-Lufkin section was cancelled, and the section east of Zavalla had been renumbered as SH 63. In 1926, U.S. Highway 70 (US 70), US 80, and US 67 were overlaid over pieces of SH 7, which maintained its number. On October 26, 1932, the highway was extended east across SH 294 into Alto, SH 21 to Nacogdoches, ending in Joaquin via current SH 7, replacing SH 76. On May 23, 1933, SH 7 Loop was designated through Post. On November 27, 1934, SH 7 Spur was designated to Southland. On July 15, 1935, the section of SH 7 from Elkhart to Alto was cancelled. On February 21, 1937, this section was restored. On February 21, 1938, SH 7 Business was designated in Goldthwaite.

On May 24, 1938, a spur to Oglesby was created, but not designated. On December 21, 1938, SH 7 Spur was designated in Oglesby. On September 26, 1939, most of the highway had been overrun by a patchwork of U.S. Highways, leaving only a small portion from Joaquin to Crockett remaining, rerouted yet again to a more southerly route from Nacogdoches, replacing SH 266 and part of SH 103. SH 7 Loop and SH 7 Spur became Spur 18 (Oglesby), Spur 45 (Southland), and Loop 46 (Post). On April 1, 1940, SH 7 was extended west to Centerville. On November 22, 1940, the section from Ratcliff to Crockett was cancelled. On December 3, 1940, SH 7 was extended west to Marquez. On February 20, 1942, the section from Ratcliff to Crockett was redesignated as part of SH 7. SH 7 replaced SH 139 from Chilton to Marquez (originally ended in Marlin; extended east on September 7, 1943) on July 15, 1948. SH 7 was signed (but not designated) to extend west to Eddy on July 31, 1975. The extension to Eddy was officially designated on August 29, 1990, replacing a portion of FM 107. At the request of the City of Nacogdoches, both SH 7 and SH 21 were re-routed onto Loop 224 and part of US 59 around the south side of town on October 25, 2018.

Historic SH 7A

SH 7A was a spur route of SH 7 that split off at Brownwood and traveled southwest to San Angelo designated on March 20, 1918, replacing part of SH 7, which was rerouted. On December 20, 1917, an intercounty highway was designated from San Angelo to Fort Stockton. On February 19, 1919, it was extended to Fort Stockton over this intercounty highway. It was transferred to portions of SH 23 and SH 30 (now US 277) on August 21, 1923, with the section from San Angelo to Fort Stockton cancelled, but this section was reinstated as SH 99 (now US 67) in 1924.

Historic SH 7B

SH 7B was a spur route of SH 7 designated on January 23, 1922, that split off at Lufkin and traveled southwest through Groveton to Trinity. On August 21, 1923, it was cancelled, but was restored as SH 94 in 1924.

== Major intersections ==
County	Location	mi	km	Destinations	Notes
McLennan	Bruceville-Eddy	0.000	0.000	I-35 / FM 107 west – Austin, Waco, Moody	I-35 exit 315
McLennan	Bruceville-Eddy	0.100	0.161	FM 1239 south	
Falls	Mooreville	6.437	10.359	FM 2643 north	
Falls	Chilton	10.626 155.027	17.101 249.492	US 77 north / Bus. SH 7-B east – Chilton, Waco	interchange; west end of US 77 overlap; route follows US 77's mileage
Falls	Chilton	155.519	250.284	FM 1950 west – Cego	
Falls	Chilton	156.192 11.791	251.367 18.976	US 77 south – Cameron	east end of US 77 overlap
Falls	Chilton	12.484	20.091	Bus. SH 7-B west – Eddy, Moody	
Falls	Chilton	13.026	20.963	FM 434 north – Satin, Waco	
Falls		16.722	26.911	FM 935 west – Troy	
Falls		17.966 18.184	28.913 29.264	SH 320 south – Lott, Westphalia	
Falls	Marlin	22.705	36.540	Bus. SH 6-N – Waco, Hearne	
Falls	Marlin	23.270	37.449	FM 147 east (Walker Street) – Groesbeck	
Falls	Marlin	24.166	38.891	SH 6 – Waco, Bryan	interchange
Falls		25.163	40.496	FM 2958 south	
Falls		32.633	52.518	FM 3144 south	
Falls		33.571	54.027	FM 1771	
Falls		36.047	58.012	FM 2745 south	
Limestone	Kosse	38.863	62.544	SH 14 – Groesbeck, Bremond	
Limestone		46.344	74.583	FM 2749 north – Thornton	
Robertson		44.144	71.043	FM 979 west – Calvert	
Robertson		56.396	90.761	FM 937 north – Groesbeck, Lake Limestone, Sterling C. Robertson Dam	
Leon	Marquez	61.475	98.934	US 79 – Jewett, Franklin	
Leon	Marquez	61.750	99.377	Loop 208	
Leon		65.507	105.423	FM 1147 south – Old Bowling	
Leon	Robbins	69.493	111.838	FM 39 – Jewett, Normangee	
Leon	Centerville	77.856	125.297	I-45 – Dallas, Houston	I-45 exit 164
Leon	Centerville	78.398	126.169	SH 75 – Madisonville, Buffalo, Fort Boggy State Park	
Leon	Centerville	78.469	126.284	FM 1119 south	
Leon		84.872	136.588	FM 811 south	
Leon		88.980	143.199	FM 1511 north	
Leon	Malvern	96.203	154.824	FM 542 north – Oakwood	
Houston		104.281	167.824	FM 132 – Porter Springs	
Houston		109.909– 110.053	176.881– 177.113	SH 21 west – Madisonville	west end of SH 21 overlap
Houston	Crockett	110.289	177.493	Loop 304 (truck route)	
Houston	Crockett	110.985	178.613	FM 229 to FM 2076	
Houston	Crockett	111.554– 111.605	179.529– 179.611	US 287 / SH 19 / SH 21 east	east end of SH 21 overlap; traffic circle around Houston County Courthouse
Houston	Crockett	112.836	181.592	Loop 304 (truck route) to US 287 / SH 7 / SH 19 / SH 21	
Houston	Berea	120.915	194.594	FM 232 – Arbor, Shady Grove	
Houston		124.745	200.758	FM 1733	
Houston	Kennard	128.072	206.112	FM 2781 – Pennington	
Houston	Kennard	128.226	206.360	FM 357 south – Apple Springs	
Houston	Ratcliff	131.617	211.817	FM 227 west	
Angelina		142.660– 142.897	229.589– 229.970	SH 103 east – Lufkin	
Angelina	Redtown	144.488	232.531	FM 1819	
Angelina	Pollok	148.996– 149.401	239.786– 240.438	US 69 – Lufkin, Tyler	interchange
Nacogdoches	Harmony	157.037	252.727	FM 2782	
Nacogdoches	Nacogdoches	163.649	263.368	US 59 north / SH 21 west / Loop 224 north (Stallings Drive) Bus. SH 7-N east (South Fredonia Street)	interchange; west end of US 59/SH 21/Loop 224 overlap; western terminus of Bus. SH 7-N
Nacogdoches	Nacogdoches	164.444	264.647	US 59 south / Bus. US 59 north (South Street) – Lufkin, Houston	interchange; east end of US 59 overlap; southern terminus of Bus. US 59-F
Nacogdoches	Nacogdoches	166.002	267.154	FM 1275 north (South University Drive) – Stephen F. Austin State University	west end of FM 1275 overlap
Nacogdoches	Nacogdoches	166.209	267.487	FM 1275 south (Rayburn Drive)	east end of FM 1275 overlap
Nacogdoches	Nacogdoches	166.775	268.398	FM 2259 (Woden Road)	
Nacogdoches	Nacogdoches	168.000	270.370	SH 21 east / Bus. SH 21-P west (East Main Street) – Nacogdoches, San Augustine	East end of SH 21 overlap; eastern terminus of Bus. SH 21-P
Nacogdoches	Nacogdoches	168.723	271.533	Loop 224 (East Stallings Drive) Bus. SH 7-N west (Center Highway)	East end of Loop 224 overlap; eastern terminus of Bus. SH 7-N
Nacogdoches		174.665	281.096	FM 2112 north	
Nacogdoches	Swift	177.007	284.865	FM 2713 north	
Nacogdoches	Martinsville	181.402	291.938	FM 95 south – Chireno	west end of FM 95 overlap
Nacogdoches	Martinsville	181.476	292.057	FM 95 north – Garrison	east end of FM 95 overlap
San Augustine	No major junctions				
Shelby		185.179	298.017	FM 2913 north	
Shelby		195.347	314.381	FM 711 south	
Shelby		197.573	317.963	Loop 500 north – San Augustine, Shelbyville	
Shelby	Center	199.092	320.408	US 96 (Hurst Street / Southview Circle / truck route) to Loop 500	
Shelby	Center	199.470– 199.562	321.016– 321.164	SH 87 (Tenaha Street / Shelbyville Street) / FM 699 north (Logansport Street)	traffic circle around Shelby County Courthouse
Shelby		200.762	323.095	FM 2788 east	
Shelby		201.126	323.681	Loop 500 south to US 96 / SH 87 / SH 7 west	
Shelby		202.428	325.776	FM 1656 north – Center Municipal Airport	
Shelby	James	205.399	330.558	FM 2608 east	
Shelby		208.714	335.893	FM 3082 east	
Shelby	Joaquin	213.783	344.050	FM 139 south – Toledo Bend Reservoir	
Shelby	Joaquin	213.910	344.255	Future I-69 / US 84 – Joaquin, Tenaha	U.S. 84 is the future Interstate 69
1.000 mi = 1.609 km; 1.000 km = 0.621 mi: Concurrency terminus

== Business routes ==
SH 7 has two business routes.

=== Chilton business route ===
Business State Highway 7-B
- Location: Chilton
- Length: 1.355 mi (2.181 km)
- Existed: 1990–present

Business State Highway 7-B (Bus. SH 7-B) is a 1.355-mile (2.181 km) long business loop that runs through Chilton. The route was created in 1990 from a section of FM 107. Bus. SH 7-B begins at an interchange with US 77. The highway continues west of the intersection as a segment of SH 7. Where SH 7 heads south, concurrent with US 77, Bus. SH 7-B heads east, before curving south at an intersection with Mooreville Road. Shortly after the southeasterly turn, Bus. SH 7-B passes the eastern terminus of County Road 4023 (CR 4023), followed by the western terminus of CR 4019. CR 4019 provides access to the center of Chilton. Bus. SH 7-B however, skirts the edge of town and does not serve the town center. From the intersection with CR 4019, Bus. SH 7-B continues south to its terminus with mainline SH 7. Although this intersection marks the end of the business route, the highway continues south as CR 494N to a dead end at the northern bank of Deer Creek.

Historic FM 107

This business route was previously designated as a section of FM 107, which used to continue east from I-35 in Bruceville-Eddy to SH 7 right outside of Chilton. Between August 29, 1990, and October 25, 1990, the eastern end of FM 107 was truncated to I-35 and the eastern section transferred to SH 7 and the newly designated Bus. SH 7-B.

Major intersections

The entire route is in Falls County.

Location	mi	km	Destinations	Notes
	0.000	0.000	US 77 / SH 7 – Waco, Cameron, Eddy	Interchange; road continues west as SH 7 west
Chilton	1.355	2.181	SH 7 / County Road 494N – Marlin	Road continues south as CR 494N
1.000 mi = 1.609 km; 1.000 km = 0.621 mi

=== Nacogdoches business route ===
Business State Highway 7-N
- Location: Nacogdoches
- Length: 4.229 mi (6.806 km)
- Existed: 2018–present

Business State Highway 7-N (Bus. SH 7-N) is a 4.229-mile (6.806 km) long business route that runs through Nacogdoches. The route was created on October 25, 2018, after SH 7 was re-routed around Nacogdoches on Loop 224 and US 59. Bus. SH 7-B begins at an interchange with SH 7 and US 59/SH 21/Loop 224. The business route then travels northeast on Fredonia Street for one mile (1.61 kilometers), then reaches an intersection with Bus. US 59-F at South Street. Bus. SH 7-B and Bus. US 59-F head north on South Street into downtown Nacogdoches, meeting at an intersection with Bus. SH 21-P at Main Street. Bus. SH 7-N turns right, leaving Bus. US 59-F, then heading east concurrently with Bus. SH 21-P on Main Street. Both business routes pass intersections with FM 1275 at University Drive and FM 2259 at Shawnee Street. At Orton Hill, Bus. SH 21-P breaks away from Bus. 7-N, heading east. Bus. SH 7-N continues northeast for a few more miles on Center Highway, before ending at a traffic controlled intersection with Loop 224 and SH 7.

Major intersections

The entire route is in Nacogdoches, Nacogdoches County.

mi	km	Destinations	Notes
0.000	0.000	US 59 / SH 21 / SH 7 east / Loop 224 (Stallings Drive) SH 7 west (South Fredonia Street)	Interchange; western terminus; road continues southwest as SH 7 west
0.990	1.593	Bus. US 59 south (South Street)	Western end of Bus. US 59-F concurrency
1.977	3.182	Bus. US 59 north (North Street) / Bus. SH 21-P west (West Main Street)	Eastern end of Bus. US 59-F concurrency; western end of Bus. SH 21-P concurrency
2.546	4.097	FM 1275 (University Drive)	
2.618	4.213	FM 2259 south (Shawnee Street) / Wedgewood Drive	Northern terminus of FM 2259
3.043	4.897	Bus. SH 21-P east (East Main Street)	Eastern end of Bus. SH 21-P concurrency
4.229	6.806	Loop 224 / SH 7 west (Stallings Drive) SH 7 east (Center Highway)	Eastern terminus; road continues northeast as SH 7
1.000 mi = 1.609 km; 1.000 km = 0.621 mi: Concurrency terminus
