= Rosebud-Lott High School =

Location
- Highway 77 North; Rosebud, Texas 76570-0638; United States; 31.138783°N 97.006668°W

Information
- School type: Public high school
- Established: 1970
- School district: Rosebud-Lott Independent School District
- Principal: Todd Williams
- Teaching staff: 17.83 (FTE)
- Grades: 9-12
- Enrollment: 221 (2018–19)
- Student to teacher ratio: 12.39
- Colors: Black & Gold
- Athletics conference: UIL Class AA
- Mascot: Cougar
- Yearbook: Panther Tracks
- Website: Rosebud-Lott High School

Rosebud-Lott High School is a public high school in Travis, Texas (USA) and classified as a 2A school by the UIL. It is part of the Rosebud-Lott Independent School District in southwestern Falls County. The school was founded in 1970 when Rosebud High School and Lott High School were consolidated. In 2015, the school was rated "Met Standard" by the Texas Education Agency.

== Athletics ==
The Rosebud-Lott Cougars compete in these sports:

- Baseball
- Basketball
- Cross Country
- Football
- Golf
- Powerlifting
- Softball
- Track and Field
- Volleyball

=== State titles ===
- Football
  - 2002(2A/D2)
- Boys Track
  - 2014 (2A)
