= Stranger, Texas =

- Unincorporated community
- Location within Texas Location within the United States
- Coordinates: 31°19′37″N 96°43′28″W
- Country: United States of America
- State: Texas
- County: Falls
- Elevation: 528 ft (161 m)

Population (2000)
  - Total: 27
- Time zone: UTC-6 (Central (CST))
  - Summer (DST): UTC-5 (CDT)
- ZIP code: 76661
- Area code: 254
- GNIS feature ID: 1380613

Stranger is an unincorporated community just north of Highway 7, and ten miles from Marlin in eastern Falls County, Texas, United States.

== History ==
The area was first settled in the 1840s. The community is also called Upper or North Blue Ridge, being linked to Blue Ridge from south of town. Stranger first started to grow after the Civil War, being granted a post office in 1879. The most accepted story of how Stranger derived its name was when a local blacksmith was asked what the name of the town was. The response of the man was he did not know, he had just moved to the area, and that he was a stranger to town. In 1884, 200 people called Stranger home. Four churches called the place home, as did a school, steam cotton gin, corn mill and a hotel. Thereafter, the population declined. By the 20th century, the town was down to 107 residents. By the 1940s, only one business was remaining in Stranger, and only half of the 107 people who were there forty years before. In the 1960s, the schools closed and consolidated with Marlin I.S.D. In 2000, the population was reportedly 27.
