= Cedar Springs, Texas =

- Unincorporated community
- Location within Texas
- Coordinates: 31°11′31″N 96°55′31″W
- Country: United States of America
- State: Texas
- County: Falls
- Named for: Spring, cedar grove
- Elevation: 410 ft (120 m)

Population (1990; as per Handbook of Texas)
  - Total: 90
- Time zone: UTC-6 (Central (CST))
  - Summer (DST): UTC-5 (CDT)
- ZIP code: 76570
- Area code: 254
- GNIS feature ID: 1998552

Cedar Springs, formerly Mill Tract, is an unincorporated community in west Falls County, Texas, United States.

== History ==
Cedar Springs is situated on Farm to Market Road 2027. It was named for a nearby spring and cedar grove. A post office called operated from 1879 to 1905, and was called Viesca, for Sarahville de Viesca. In 1891, the San Antonio and Aransas Pass Railway was completed, which bypassed Cedar Springs by 6 miles. Many residents moved to establish Lott. From 1910, the community continued to decline. As of the 1970 and 1990 census, Cedar Springs had a population of 90.
