= Pleasant Grove, Falls County, Texas =

Unincorporated community in Texas, US

Coordinates: 31°07′50″N 96°54′13″W

Pleasant Grove is an unincorporated community in Falls County, Texas, United States. It is located on FM 1048.

== History ==
A church and school were built in town by the late 19th century. The school district consolidated with Rosebud-Lott Independent School District in 1953. The population peaked at about seventy in the 1930s. It has remained at a steady 35 residents since the 1970s.
