= Bruceville-Eddy High School =

Location
- 1 Eagle St; Eddy, Texas 76524-0099; United States; 31.307265°N 97.246940°W

Information
- School type: Public high school
- Motto: Commit to Excellence
- Established: 1928
- School district: Bruceville-Eddy Independent School District
- Principal: Joe Woodard
- Teaching staff: 27.51 (on an FTE basis)
- Grades: 9-12
- Enrollment: 200 (2023–24)
- Student to teacher ratio: 7.27
- Colors: Black and Gold
- Athletics conference: UIL Class AA
- Mascot: Eagle/Lady Eagle
- Website: Bruceville-Eddy High School website

Bruceville-Eddy High School is a public high school located in Bruceville-Eddy, Texas that serves about 200 students in grades 9-12 and classified as a 2A school by the UIL. The High School is part of the Bruceville-Eddy Independent School District which covers southern McLennan County, Texas. In 2013, the school was rated "Met Standard" by the Texas Education Agency.

== Athletics ==
The Bruceville-Eddy Eagles compete in:

- Baseball
- Basketball
- Cross Country
- Football
- Golf
- Powerlifting
- Softball
- Track and Field
- Volleyball
