= Bruceville-Eddy Independent School District =

School district in Texas

Bruceville-Eddy Independent School District is a public school district based in Bruceville-Eddy, Texas (USA).

Located in southern McLennan County, portions of the district extend into Falls and Bell counties.

Bruceville-Eddy High School was a 2005 National Blue Ribbon School.

In 2009, the school district was rated "academically acceptable" by the Texas Education Agency.

== Schools ==
- Bruceville-Eddy High School
- Junior High School
- Intermediate School
- Elementary School
