= Golinda, Texas =

- City
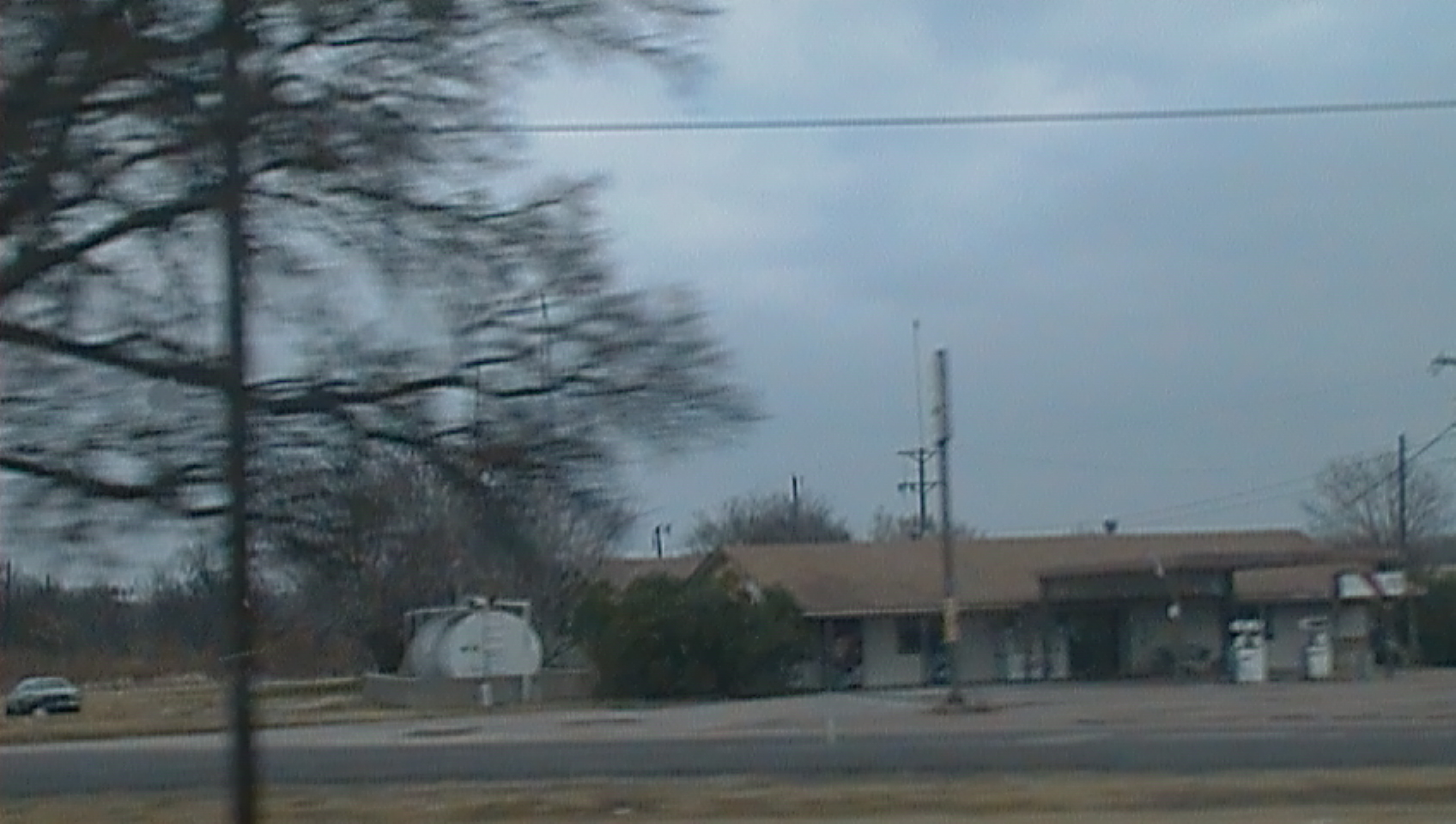
- This Citgo gas station was the only major branded business in Golinda until 2016, when a Dollar General Store was erected along U.S. 77.

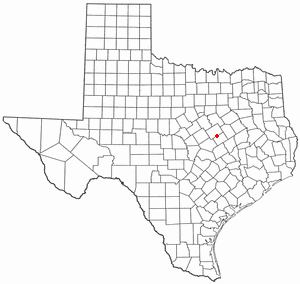
- Location of Golinda, Texas

- Coordinates: 31°22′34″N 97°04′35″W
- Country: United States
- State: Texas
- Counties: Falls, McLennan

Area
  - Total: 4.06 sq mi (10.51 km^{2})
  - Land: 4.02 sq mi (10.41 km^{2})
  - Water: 0.039 sq mi (0.10 km^{2})
- Elevation: 456 ft (139 m)

Population (2020)
  - Total: 618
  - Density: 146.5/sq mi (56.57/km^{2})
- Time zone: UTC-6 (Central (CST))
  - Summer (DST): UTC-5 (CDT)
- ZIP code: 76655
- Area code: 254
- FIPS code: 48-30092
- GNIS feature ID: 2410616
- Website: www.cityofgolinda.com

Golinda is a city in Falls and McLennan counties in the U.S. state of Texas. The population was 618 at the 2020 census, an increase over the figure of 559 tabulated in 2010.

Golinda is part of the Waco Metropolitan Statistical Area.

== Geography ==
Golinda is located primarily in northern Falls County. The city limits extend north into southern McLennan County.

U.S. Route 77 passes through Golinda, leading north 13 miles (21 km) to Waco and south 38 miles (61 km) to Cameron.

According to the United States Census Bureau, the city of Golinda has a total area of 4.1 square miles (10.6 km^{2}), of which 0.04 square miles (0.1 km^{2}), or 0.97%, is water.

== History ==
Golinda was the home of Sank Majors, a Black man who was lynched by a white mob in Waco in 1905. According to a contemporary account in The Houston Post, the people in the mob came from the Golinda area.

== Demographics ==
Historical population
Census	Pop.	Note	%±
1980	335		—
1990	347		3.6%
2000	423		21.9%
2010	559		32.2%
2020	618		10.6%
U.S. Decennial Census

=== 2020 census ===
As of the 2020 census, Golinda had a population of 618. The median age was 43.9 years. 21.2% of residents were under the age of 18 and 24.9% of residents were 65 years of age or older. For every 100 females there were 104.0 males, and for every 100 females age 18 and over there were 102.1 males age 18 and over.

There were 242 households in Golinda, including 161 families; 28.5% had children under the age of 18 living in them. Of all households, 51.2% were married-couple households, 21.1% were households with a male householder and no spouse or partner present, and 21.1% were households with a female householder and no spouse or partner present. About 23.5% of all households were made up of individuals and 12.4% had someone living alone who was 65 years of age or older.

0.0% of residents lived in urban areas, while 100.0% lived in rural areas.

There were 258 housing units, of which 6.2% were vacant. The homeowner vacancy rate was 0.5% and the rental vacancy rate was 0.0%.

Racial composition as of the 2020 census
Race	Number	Percent
White	412	66.7%
Black or African American	87	14.1%
American Indian and Alaska Native	3	0.5%
Asian	0	0.0%
Native Hawaiian and Other Pacific Islander	3	0.5%
Some other race	57	9.2%
Two or more races	56	9.1%
Hispanic or Latino (of any race)	126	20.4%

=== 2000 census ===
As of the census of 2000, there were 423 people, 171 households, and 128 families residing in the city. The population density was 101.8 inhabitants per square mile (39.3/km^{2}). There were 185 housing units at an average density of 44.5 per square mile (17.2/km^{2}). The racial makeup of the city was 76.36% White, 19.15% African American, 0.24% Asian, 4.26% from other races. Hispanic or Latino of any race were 8.27% of the population.

There were 171 households, out of which 24.6% had children under the age of 18 living with them, 62.0% were married couples living together, 8.8% had a female householder with no husband present, and 24.6% were non-families. 24.0% of all households were made up of individuals, and 12.9% had someone living alone who was 65 years of age or older. The average household size was 2.47 and the average family size was 2.89.

In the city, the population was spread out, with 20.1% under the age of 18, 7.1% from 18 to 24, 26.2% from 25 to 44, 27.2% from 45 to 64, and 19.4% who were 65 years of age or older. The median age was 42 years. For every 100 females, there were 92.3 males. For every 100 females age 18 and over, there were 89.9 males.

The median income for a household in the city was $32,955, and the median income for a family was $38,472. Males had a median income of $21,979 versus $22,159 for females. The per capita income for the city was $14,136. About 8.8% of families and 7.9% of the population were below the poverty line, including 10.6% of those under age 18 and 13.8% of those age 65 or over.

== Education ==
The Falls County portion of Golinda is served by the Chilton Independent School District. The Robinson Independent School District serves the McLennan County portion of the city.
