= Robinson Independent School District =

School district in Texas

Coordinates: 31.4657°N 97.1221°W

Robinson Independent School District is a public school district based in Robinson, Texas (USA).

In addition to Robinson, the district serves part of Golinda and extends into a small portion of Falls County.

In 2010, the school district was rated "academically acceptable" by the Texas Education Agency.

== Schools ==
- Robinson High (Grades 9–12)
- Robinson Junior High (Grades 7–8)
- Robinson Intermediate (Grades 4–6)
- Robinson Elementary (Grades 2–3)
- Robinson Primary (Grades PK-1)

== Extracurricular activities ==
- The Robinson High School Marching Band, nicknamed "The Pride of the Blue", has won five state marching championships (1982, 1984, 1994, 1996, 2000) and has made 25 appearances at the state marching contest.
- The high school girls' softball team won the UIL 3A state championship in 2000.
- The UIL Academic teams send students to state almost every year, usually in the areas of science, social studies, literary criticism, and current events.
- Students also have won individual UIL 3A state titles in track, cross country, and power lifting.
- The girls' basketball team has won the state championship twice - in 1970 as a 2A school, and in 2009 in the 3A division.
- In 2006, the Robinson Rockets football team made it to their first state championship game, losing to Liberty-Eylau 35–34.
- In 2010, the Robinson Rockets softball team went to the state tournament, losing in the state semi-finals.

== Additional information ==
- Robinson Independent School District is classified as 4A by the (UIL) University Interscholastic League.

== Trivia ==
- Sixth grade used to be held at the Rosenthal-Robinson Sixth Grade Center until 1999. The building had been in use as a school house since the 1920s.
- Robinson I.S.D. encompasses many small rural towns, including Golinda, Levi, Rosenthal, Asa, Downsville, and Mooreville.
- Jason Tucker, who played football for the Cincinnati Bengals and Dallas Cowboys, attended Robinson for Junior High and High School, graduating in 1994.
