= Tomlinson Hill, Texas =

- Unincorporated community
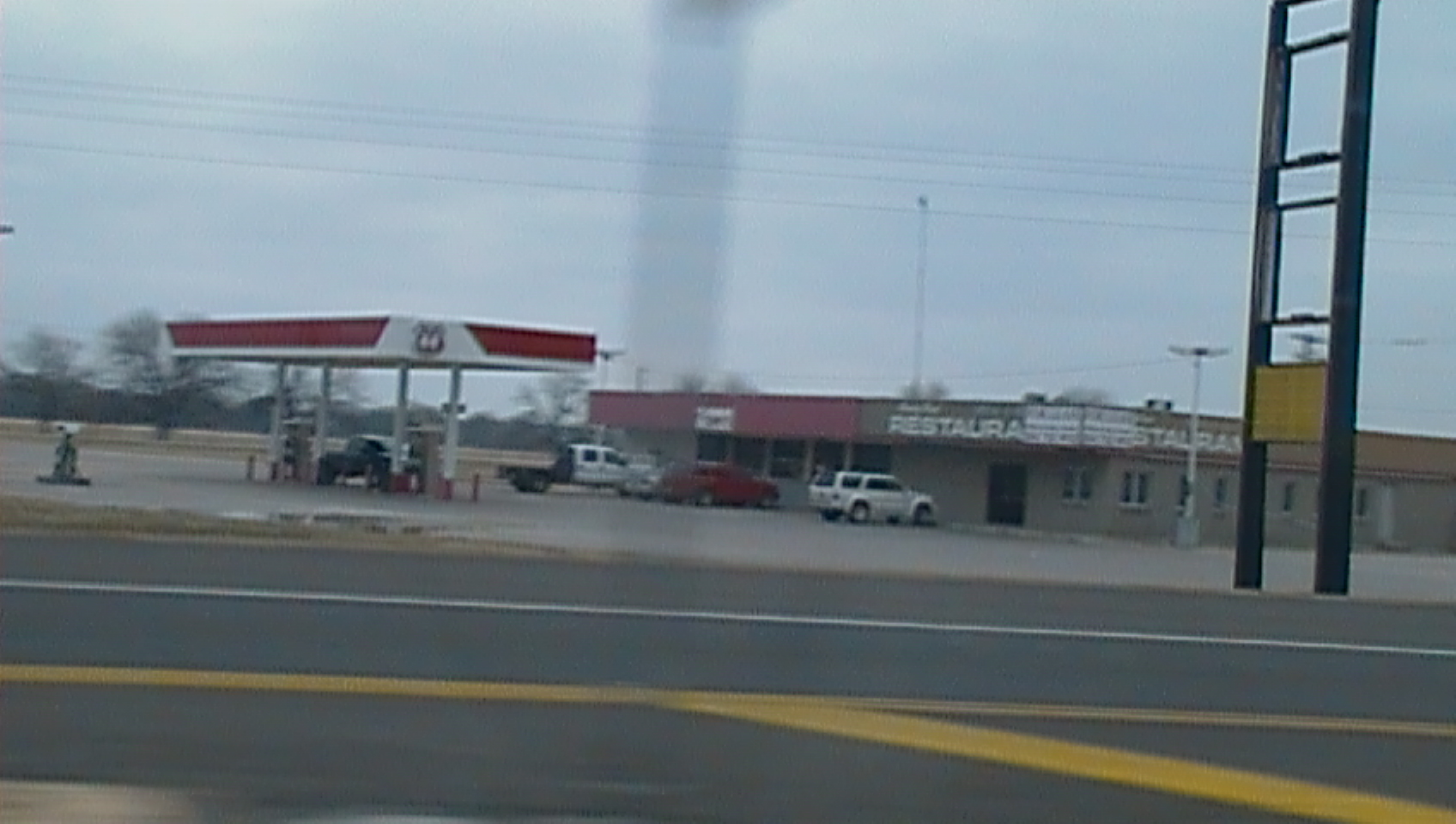
- Gas station and closed restaurant at junction with Highway 7

- Location within Texas Location within the United States
- Coordinates: 31°15′57″N 96°59′17″W
- Country: United States of America
- State: Texas
- County: Falls
- Elevation: 420 ft (130 m)

Population (2000)
  - Total: 64
- Time zone: UTC-6 (Central (CST))
  - Summer (DST): UTC-5 (CDT)
- ZIP code: 76661
- Area code: 254
- GNIS feature ID: 1370004

Tomlinson Hill is a small unincorporated community in Falls County, Texas, United States. It lies approximately 7½ miles west of Marlin on State Highway 320 and approximately 1½ miles west-southwest of the junction of 320 and State Highway 7.

== History ==
It was named for James K. Tomlinson, a native of Georgia who settled in the area with his family in the 1850s. After emancipation, many of Tomlinson's former slaves took his last name. Most of the Tomlinsons have since moved from the area, but some remain, and one notable resident returned – the late Oliver Tomlinson, the father of former National Football League (NFL) player LaDainian Tomlinson. The school had fifty-one students in 1933. In the 1940s, there were four businesses, a school, and several houses. By the 1980s, there was only a church and one business. It was also the site of the annual meeting of the Old Settlers and Veterans Association of Falls County. The population was sixty-four in 2000.

In 2012, a documentary featuring a white descendant, Chris Tomlinson, and a black descendant, Loreane Tomlinson, was directed by Lisa Kaselak.
