= McClanahan, Texas =

Unincorporated community in Texas, US

Coordinates: 31°21′26″N 96°49′43″W

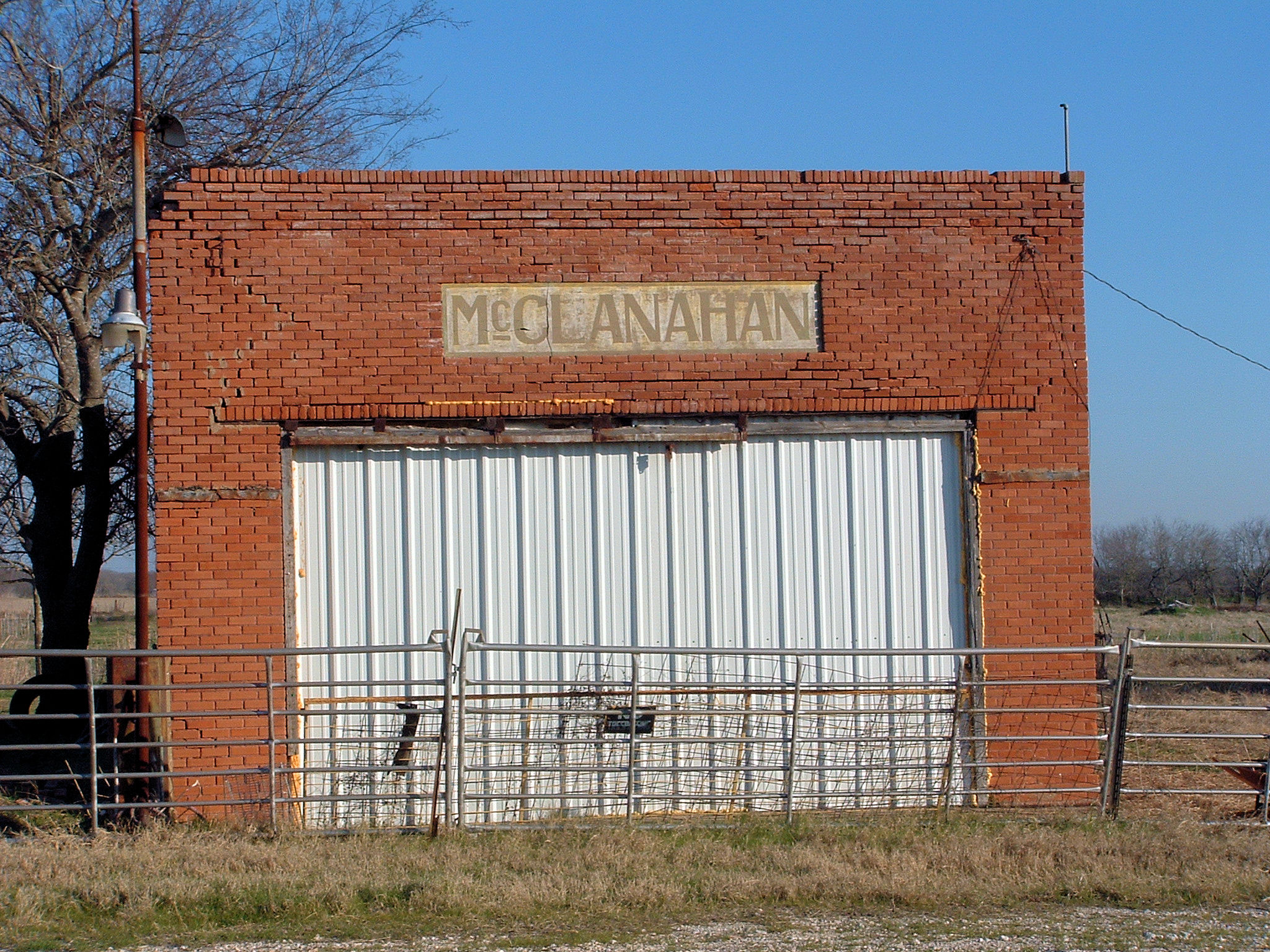
Old building in McClanahan

McClanahan, Texas is an unincorporated community in Falls County, Texas, United States. It is six miles northeast of the county seat, Marlin, on FM 147.

== History ==
A post office operated in the small town from 1887 to 1904. In 1890, when the population peaked at 150 residents, the community had two general stores and a Baptist church. Population continued to drop due in part to the Missouri Pacific Railroad abandoning the tracks that had run through the town between Marlin and Waco. The population was 42 in 2000.
