= Robinson High School (Texas) =

Location
- 700 West Tate Drive; Robinson, Texas 76706-5505; United States; 31°27′46″N 97°7′17″W

Information
- School type: Public high school
- Motto: Rockets Never Quit
- Established: 1963
- School district: Robinson Independent School District
- Principal: Kati Dietzman
- Staff: 55.77 (on an FTE basis)
- Grades: 9-12
- Enrollment: 717 (2023–2024)
- Student to teacher ratio: 12.86
- Colors: Royal blue and white
- Athletics conference: UIL Class AAAA
- Mascot: Rocket
- Team name: Rockets
- Newspaper: Vapor Trails
- Yearbook: Galaxy
- Website: Robinson High School

Robinson High School (commonly Robinson or RHS) is a public high school located in Robinson, Texas, United States and is classified as a 4A school by the University Interscholastic League. It is part of the Robinson Independent School District, which serves students mostly from Robinson; parts of the district extend into Lorena and Waco. The district also covers several small rural towns including Golinda, Levi, Rosenthal, Asa, Downsville, and Mooreville. In 2015, the school was rated "Met Standard" by the Texas Education Agency.

== Athletics ==
The Robinson Rockets compete in these sports -

Cross Country, Volleyball, Football, Basketball, Swimming, Powerlifting, Soccer, Tennis, Golf, Track, Baseball and Softball.

Until the mid-2000s, the girls' athletic teams were referred to as the Rockettes; however, this nickname has largely fallen out of use and now refers chiefly to the school's drill team. Students also have won individual UIL 3A state titles in track, cross country, and powerlifting.

=== State titles ===
- Baseball
  - 2026(4A/D2)
- Girls' Basketball -
  - 1970(2A), 2009(3A)
- Girls' Track -
  - 1974(1A)
- Softball -
  - 1999(3A), 2025(4A/D2)
- Tennis-2008 (3A) Boys doubles

== Band ==
The Robinson High School Marching Band, "The Pride of the Blue" has made 20 appearances at the UIL State Marching Contest, winning four marching championships.

- Marching Band State Champions
  - 1981 (3A), 1984(3A), 1994(3A), 1996(3A)

== Notable alumni ==
- Braxton Ashcraft - MLB pitcher for the Pittsburgh Pirates.
- Clint Dolezel - American football coach and former professional arena football player in the Arena Football League (AFL).
- Jason Tucker - NFL & CFL Football - Dallas Cowboys, Edmonton Eskimos.
