= Mooreville, Texas =

- Unincorporated community
- Location within Texas Location within the United States
- Coordinates: 31°18′08″N 97°08′27″W
- Country: United States of America
- State: Texas
- County: Falls
- Elevation: 535 ft (163 m)

Population (2000)
  - Total: 95
- Time zone: UTC-6 (Central (CST))
  - Summer (DST): UTC-5 (CDT)
- ZIP code: 76632
- Area code: 254
- GNIS feature ID: 1363127

Mooreville is an unincorporated community in Falls County, Texas, United States. It is located just off State Highway 7, four miles (6.4 km) northwest of Chilton on Farm to Market Road 2643. Never incorporated, Mooreville posted a population of approximately 95 in 2000 after peaking at 180 in the late 19th century. The post office was discontinued in 1906, and the school consolidated with Chilton in 1950.
