= Perry, Texas =

- Unincorporated community
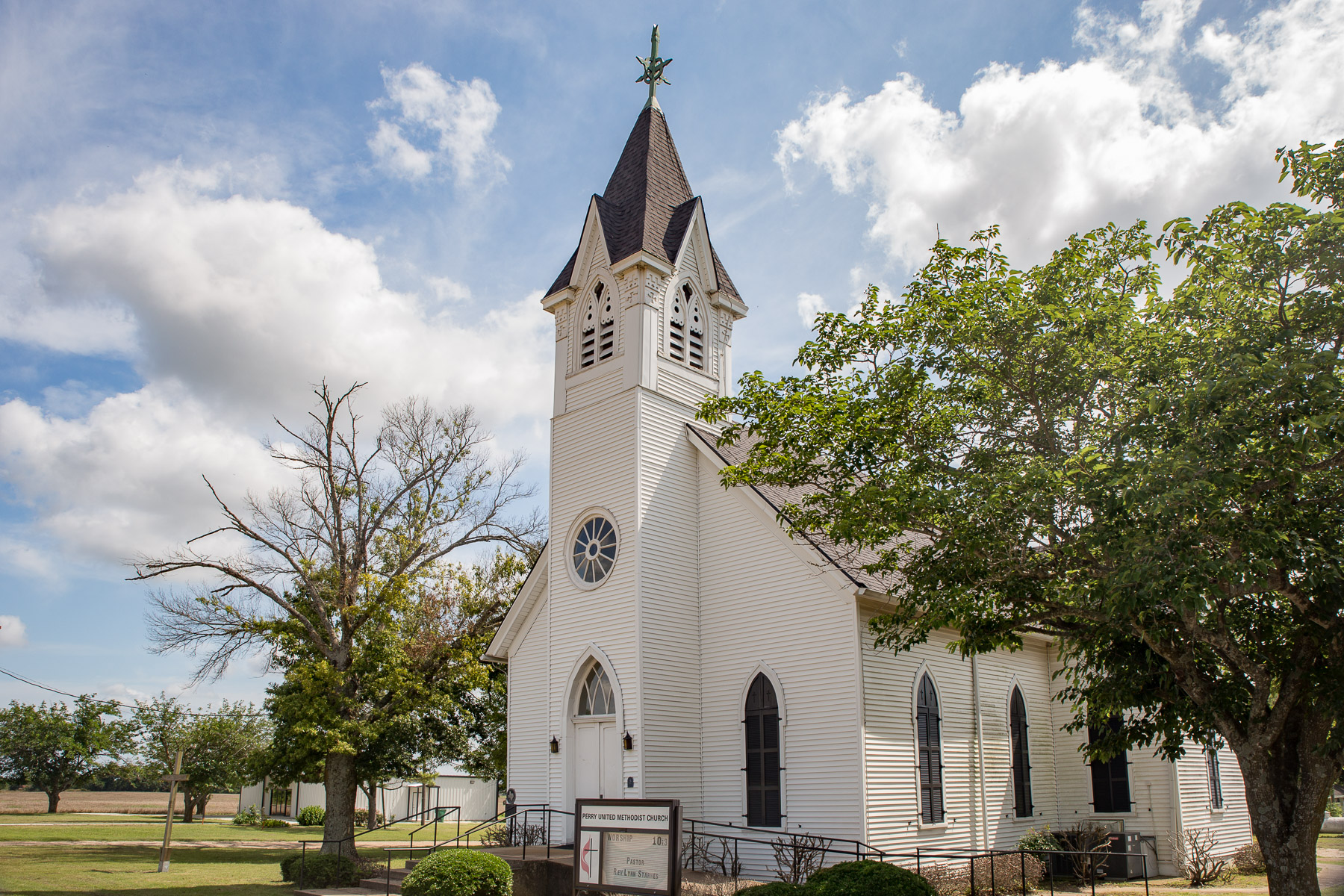
- Perry United Methodist Church

- Location within Texas Location within the United States
- Coordinates: 31°25′05″N 96°54′55″W
- Country: United States of America
- State: Texas
- County: Falls

Area
  - Total: 89.5 sq mi (232 km^{2})
- Elevation: 472 ft (144 m)

Population (2000)
  - Total: 76
  - Density: 7.9/sq mi (3.1/km^{2})
- Time zone: UTC-6 (Central (CST))
  - Summer (DST): UTC-5 (CDT)
- ZIP code: 76661
- Area code: 254
- GNIS feature ID: 1365073

Perry is an unincorporated community in northern Falls County, Texas, United States. It was named after Albert G. Perry, a signatory of the Texas Declaration of Independence.
