= Barclay, Texas =

- Unincorporated community
- Location within Texas Location within the United States
- Coordinates: 31°04′36″N 97°06′34″W
- Country: United States of America
- State: Texas
- County: Falls
- Elevation: 522 ft (159 m)

Population (2009 local estimate)
  - Total: 58
- Time zone: UTC-6 (Central (CST))
  - Summer (DST): UTC-5 (CDT)
- ZIP code: 76656
- Area code: 254
- GNIS feature ID: 1351499

Barclay is an unincorporated community in southwestern Falls County, Texas, United States. Barclay, the southernmost community in Falls County, is located on Farm to Market Road 413. The estimated population was 58 in 2009.
