= Travis, Texas =

- Unincorporated community
- Location within Texas Location within the United States
- Coordinates: 31°08′08″N 97°00′10″W
- Country: United States
- State: Texas
- County: Falls
- Elevation: 469 ft (143 m)

Population (2000)
  - Total: 60
- Time zone: UTC-6 (Central (CST))
  - Summer (DST): UTC-5 (CDT)
- ZIP code: 76656
- Area code: 254
- FIPS code: 48-46740
- GNIS feature ID: 1370082

Travis is an unincorporated community in southeastern Falls County, Texas, United States. It is named after Travis Fleming Jones, who surveyed the site for the San Antonio and Aransas Pass Railway, in the 1880s. The railroad was built through the community in 1891, after which Travis gained a post office, a general store, and a population of 75; its population reached about 300 in the 1920s and 1930s before declining in later decades. The population rose to 300 in the 1920s and 1930s, but then decreased to 60 by 1990 and has remained at that figure since.
