= Chilton, Texas =

- Census-designated place (CDP) & unincorporated community
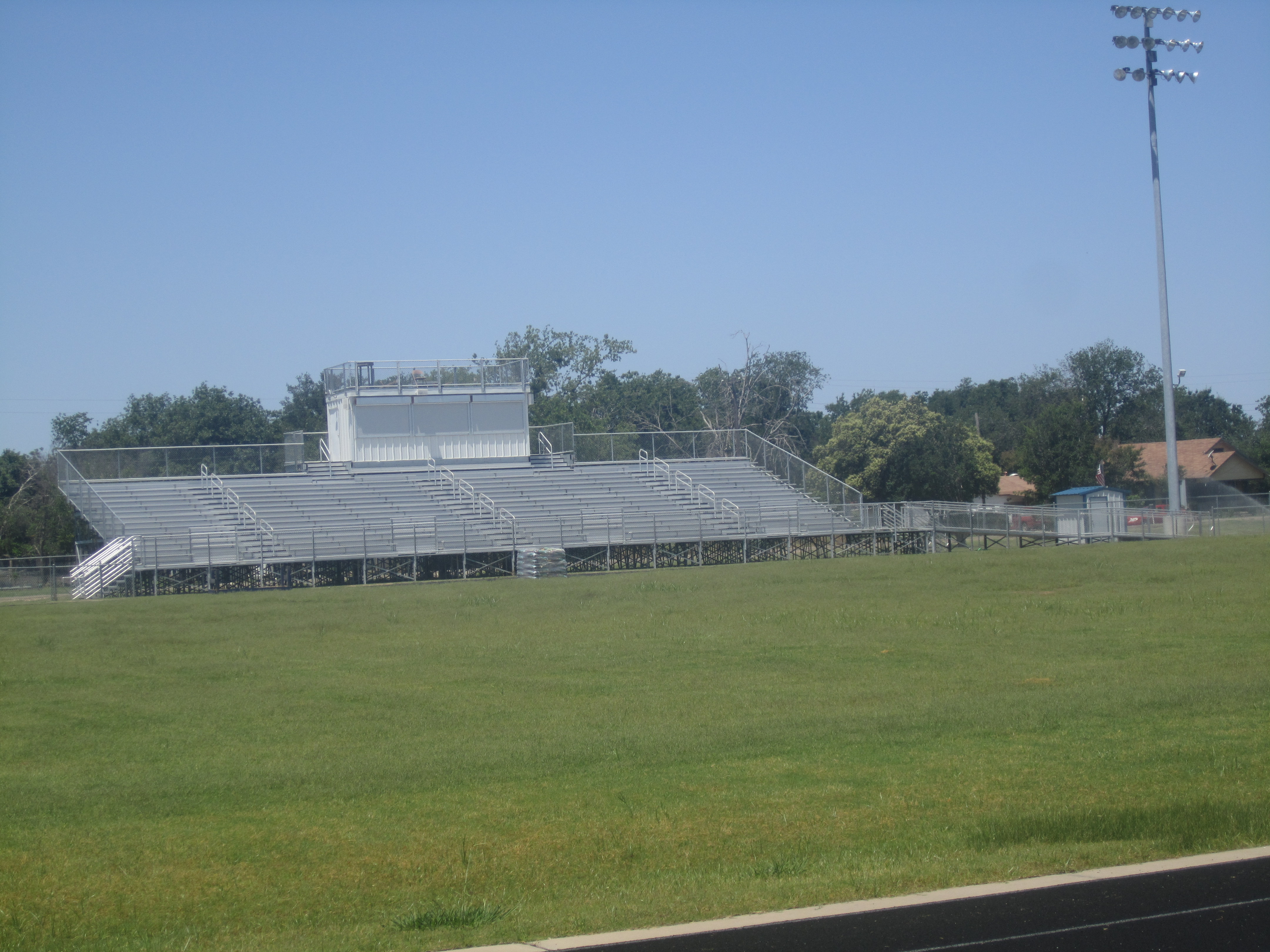
- Featherston Field in Chilton

- Location within Texas Location within the United States
- Coordinates: 31°17′05″N 97°03′39″W
- Country: United States of America
- State: Texas
- County: Falls

Area
  - Total: 3.97 sq mi (10.29 km^{2})
  - Land: 3.95 sq mi (10.23 km^{2})
  - Water: 0.023 sq mi (0.06 km^{2})
- Elevation: 446 ft (136 m)

Population (2020)
  - Total: 776
  - Density: 230/sq mi (89/km^{2})
- Time zone: UTC-6 (Central (CST))
  - Summer (DST): UTC-5 (CDT)
- ZIP code: 76632
- Area code: 254
- FIPS code: 48-14692
- GNIS feature ID: 2586919

Chilton is a census-designated place (CDP) and unincorporated community in Falls County, Texas, United States. It had a population of 776 at the 2020 census.

Chilton is located in western Falls County. U.S. Route 77 forms the western edge of the community, leading north 20 miles (32 km) to Waco and south 16 miles (26 km) to Rosebud. Texas State Highway 7 passes through the center of Chilton, leading east 10 miles (16 km) to Marlin, the county seat, and west 12 miles (19 km) to Bruceville-Eddy.

== Demographics ==
Historical population
Census	Pop.	Note	%±
2010	911		—
2020	776		−14.8%
U.S. Decennial Census; 1850–1900 1910; 1920 1930 1940; 1950 1960 1970; 1980 1990 2000; 2010 2020

Chilton first appeared as a census designated place in the 2010 U.S. census.

=== 2020 census ===
Chilton CDP, Texas – Racial and ethnic composition Note: the US Census treats Hispanic/Latino as an ethnic category. This table excludes Latinos from the racial categories and assigns them to a separate category. Hispanics/Latinos may be of any race.
Race / Ethnicity (NH = Non-Hispanic)	Pop 2010	Pop 2020	% 2010	% 2020
White alone (NH)	266	194	29.20%	25.00%
Black or African American alone (NH)	84	81	9.22%	10.44%
Native American or Alaska Native alone (NH)	2	0	0.22%	0.00%
Asian alone (NH)	2	2	0.22%	0.26%
Native Hawaiian or Pacific Islander alone (NH)	3	2	0.33%	0.26%
Other race alone (NH)	5	5	0.55%	0.64%
Mixed race or Multiracial (NH)	7	22	0.77%	2.84%
Hispanic or Latino (any race)	542	470	59.50%	60.57%
Total	911	776	100.00%	100.00%

As of the 2020 United States census, there were 776 people, 247 households, and 190 families residing in the CDP.

== Education ==
The Chilton Independent School District, which covers the CDP, offers extra-curricular activities, most notably football, which is played in the stadium at Featherston Field. In 2006, Chilton won its second 1A state football championship.
