= Sarahville de Viesca, Texas =

- Ghost town
- Location within Texas Location within the United States
- Coordinates: 31°15′00″N 95°55′15″W
- Country: United States of America
- State: Texas
- County: Falls
- Elevation: 322 ft (98 m)
- Time zone: UTC-6 (Central (CST))
  - Summer (DST): UTC-5 (CDT)

Sarahville de Viesca or Fort Milam or Bucksnort is a ghost town in Falls County, Texas, United States. The settlement was established in 1834 by Sterling C. Robertson and named for his mother Mrs. Sarah (née Maclin) Robertson and Agustín Viesca, the Mexican governor of Coahuila y Tejas. The site was located at the falls of the Brazos River, where the river formerly dropped 10 feet (3 m) and where a well-used ford was located. The town was temporarily deserted in 1836 during the Runaway Scrape and permanently abandoned soon afterward because of native American raids. Fort Milam was built on the west-bank site but abandoned a few years later in favor of the town of Bucksnort, which occupied the east bank. Bucksnort vanished when the nearby town of Marlin was founded. There is a county park and historical marker located where Farm to Market Road 712 crosses the Brazos, south of Marlin.
