= Houston County Courthouse (Texas) =

Historic courthouse in Texas, United States

- U.S. National Register of Historic Places
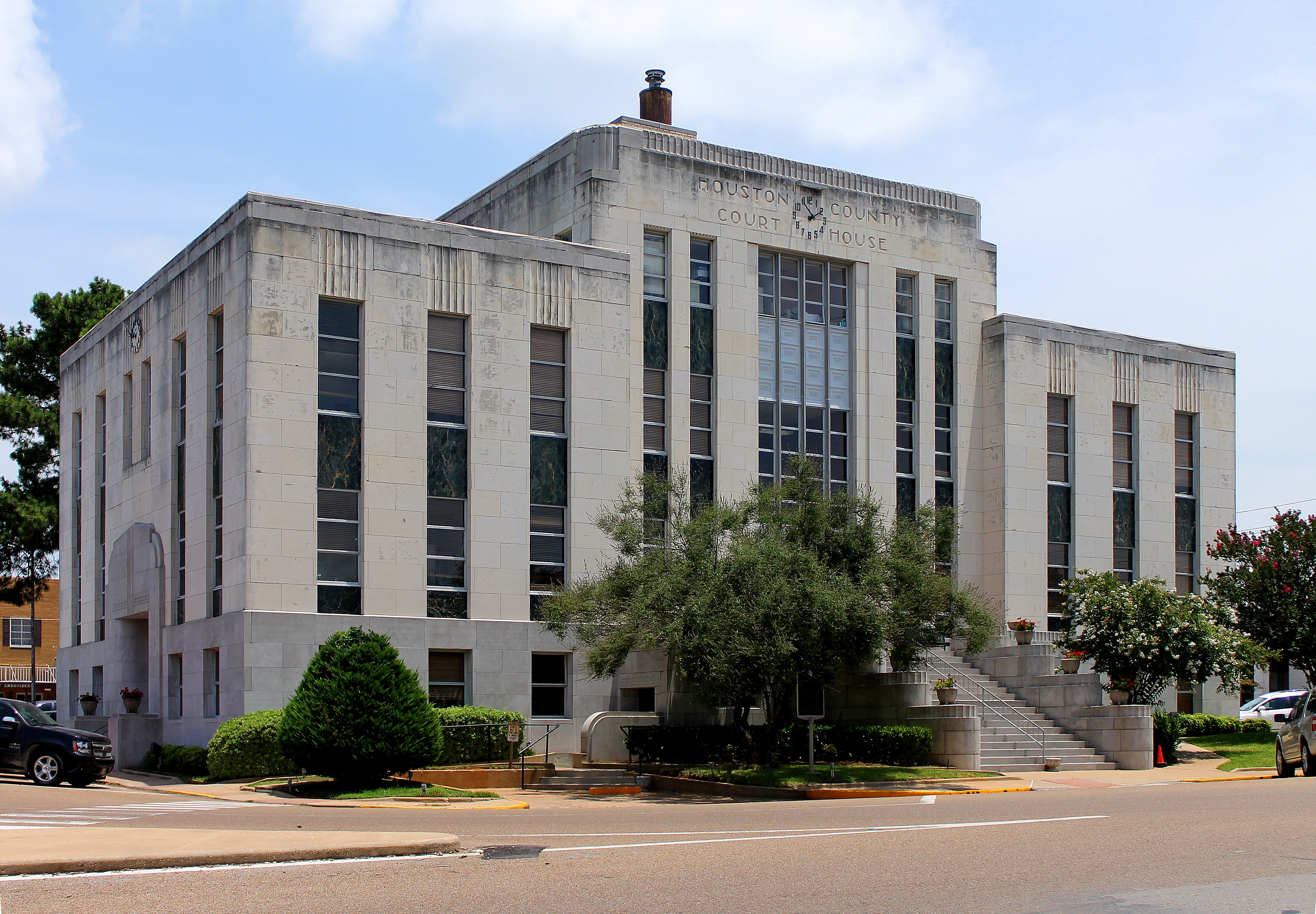
- Houston County Courthouse in 2014

- Location within Texas Location within the United States
- Location: 401 E Houston Ave, Crockett, Texas
- Coordinates: 31°19′15″N 95°27′25″W
- Area: less than one acre
- Built: 1939
- Architect: Blum E. Hester
- Architectural style: Modern Movement, Moderne
- Website: Official website
- NRHP reference No.: 10000248
- Added to NRHP: May 10, 2010

Houston County Courthouse is a historic county courthouse in Crockett, Texas, United States. Built in 1939, it is Houston County's fifth courthouse. It was designed in the Moderne architectural style by Houston architect Blum E. Hester. It was listed on the National Register of Historic Places in 2010 for its historical and architectural significance.

== Location ==
Houston County Courthouse is in Crockett, the county seat of Houston County, Texas. It is situated on a public square bounded by East Houston Avenue, South Fifth Street, Goliad Avenue, and South Fourth Street. Surrounding the courthouse are various buildings, both contemporary to the period it was built as well as modern.

== History ==
Houston County and Crockett were both established in 1837. The first version of courthouse was a log cabin built the following year on the square, which was replaced by a more permanent brick building in 1851. This second courthouse was destroyed by fire in 1865, also burning most of the county's records. Government proceedings were temporarily hosted in a commercial building on the square. The American Civil War and its aftermath, as well as multiple other fires and a drought, delayed rebuilding the courthouse until 1871. This courthouse burned in another fire in 1882 and was again rebuilt the following year. This fourth courthouse was designed by W.C. Dodson of Waco in the Second Empire style and featured a large, central clock tower atop the building's roof.

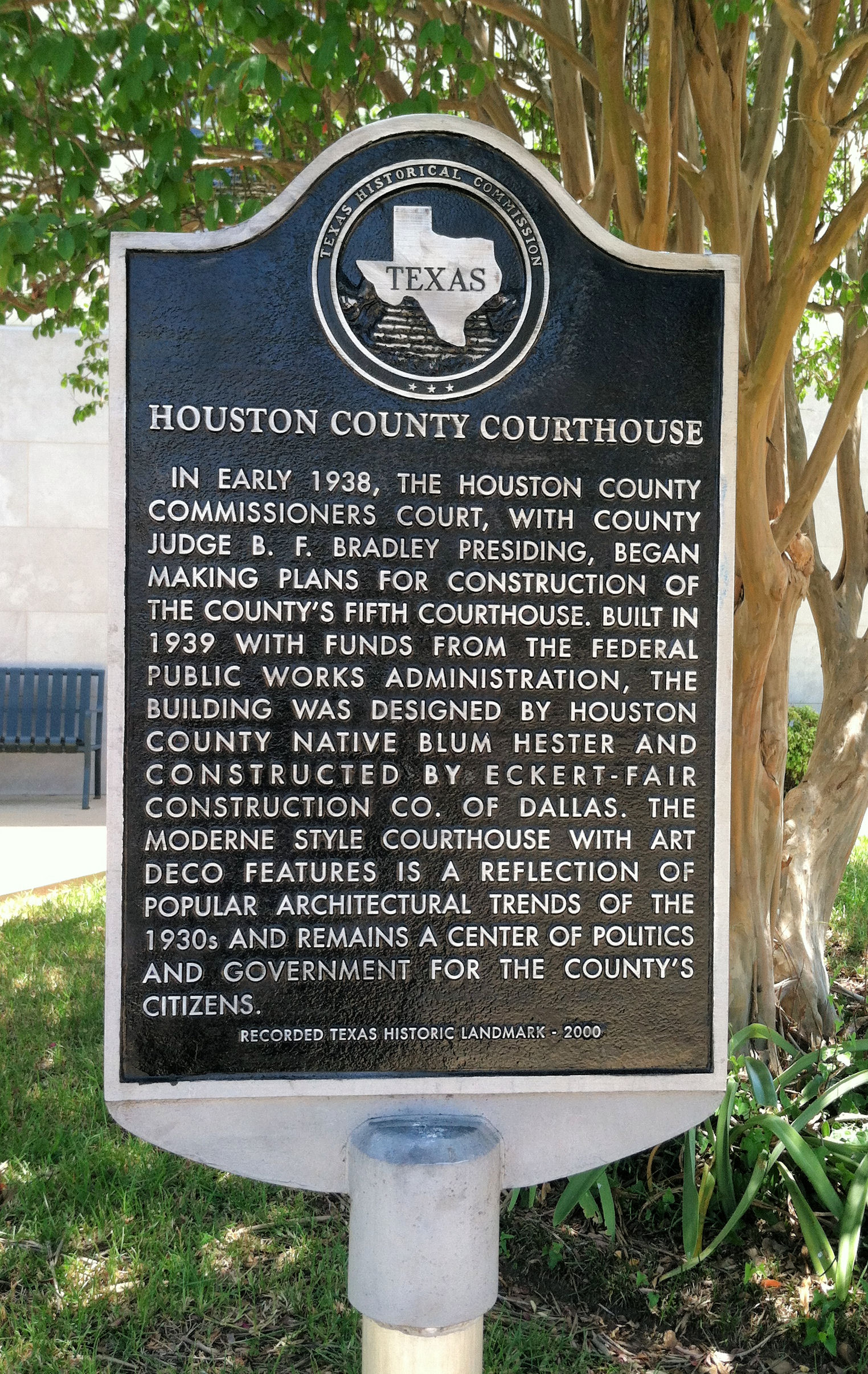
Historical marker outside the courthouse

By the 1930s, a 50-year period of economic boom had brought thousands of new residents to Houston County, and several new government buildings—including a post office, jail, and city hall—were built during this time. However, the Great Depression and Dust Bowl both caused the largely-agricultural county's economy to suffer. On February 18, 1938, Houston County applied through the Public Works Administration for partial funding to build a new courthouse, which was subsequently approved. In March, the county hired Houston-based architect Blum E. Hester to design the building, and in November, Eckert-Fair Construction Company of Dallas won the construction bid.

The cornerstone for the new courthouse was laid in July 1939 and included several artifacts donated by local citizens, including photographs, documents including a marriage certificate, a copy of the New Testament, and a fountain pen. The cost of the new courthouse exceeded $180,000. Construction continued through to October. The building was accepted by the Houston County Commissioners in late 1939 and early 1940 and opened shortly thereafter. The courthouse has since served not just as a governmental seat but also as a community space, hosting festivals, parades, and other public events.

== Architecture ==
Blum Hester designed the Houston County Courthouse in the Moderne architectural style, which was typical of county courthouses at the time. The limestone building features a large central structure and two smaller side wings, with a central entrance and narrow vertical window bays. A clock sits on each side of the building, reminiscent of the 1883 courthouse.

== See also ==
- List of county courthouses in Texas
