= Highbank, Texas =

- Unincorporated community
- Location within Texas Location within the United States
- Coordinates: 31°10′12″N 96°50′01″W
- Country: United States of America
- State: Texas
- County: Falls
- Elevation: 322 ft (98 m)
- Time zone: UTC-6 (Central (CST))
  - Summer (DST): UTC-5 (CDT)
- ZIP code: 76680
- Area code: 254
- GNIS feature ID: 1359200

Highbank is an unincorporated community in southern Falls County, Texas, United States. It lies along Farm to Market Road 413, just east of the Brazos River.
