= Durango, Texas =

- Unincorporated community
- Location within Texas Location within the United States
- Coordinates: 31°12′18″N 97°07′50″W
- Country: United States of America
- State: Texas
- County: Falls
- Elevation: 584 ft (178 m)
- Time zone: UTC-6 (Central (CST))
  - Summer (DST): UTC-5 (CDT)
- ZIP code: 76656
- Area code: 254
- GNIS feature ID: 1356473

Durango is an unincorporated community in western Falls County, Texas, United States. It lies along Farm to Market Road 935.

It is possible Hollywood screenwriter Louis Stevens had this community in mind when he wrote up the working title of Last Gun in Durango, which would become the 1957 Hollywood movie Gun Duel in Durango. In that film's script, the lead role character, played by George Montgomery, carried the name of "Will Sabre" but to change the nature of his life from outlaw to just a regular law abiding citizen, he adopts the alias of "Dan Tomlinson".
