= Satin, Texas =

- Unincorporated community
- Location within Texas Location within the United States
- Coordinates: 31°20′48″N 97°01′54″W
- Country: United States of America
- State: Texas
- County: Falls
- Established: 1873
- Elevation: 400 ft (120 m)

Population (2000)
  - Total: 86
- Time zone: UTC-6 (Central (CST))
  - Summer (DST): UTC-5 (CDT)
- ZIP code: 76685
- Area code: 254
- GNIS feature ID: 1367787

Satin is an unincorporated community in Falls County, Texas, United States, four miles from Chilton. Satin is located in the northern part of the county, on Farm to Market Road 434.

== History ==
Satin was established in 1872 after a sawmill was built near the current site, on Cow Bayou. The population grew when the San Antonio and Aransas Pass Railway built tracks there between 1889 and 1892. Before Satin, the town was previously named Laguna and Cedar Point. Satin was supposedly the name of a railroad employee once a post office, which is still running today, was established in 1917. The population peaked at 200 residents in 1931, but dropped afterwards and fell to 86 by 2000.
