= Zipperlandville, Texas =

Unincorporated community in Texas, US

Zipperlandville is an unincorporated community in Falls County, Texas, United States. It was settled by immigrants of Czech, German, Serbian, Croatian, and Slovenian descent during the 1870s. The town was named in honor of the Zipperlen family, owners of a gin and a general goods store in town. In 2000 the population of Zipperlandville was 22.
