= Falls County, Texas =

County in Texas, United States

- County
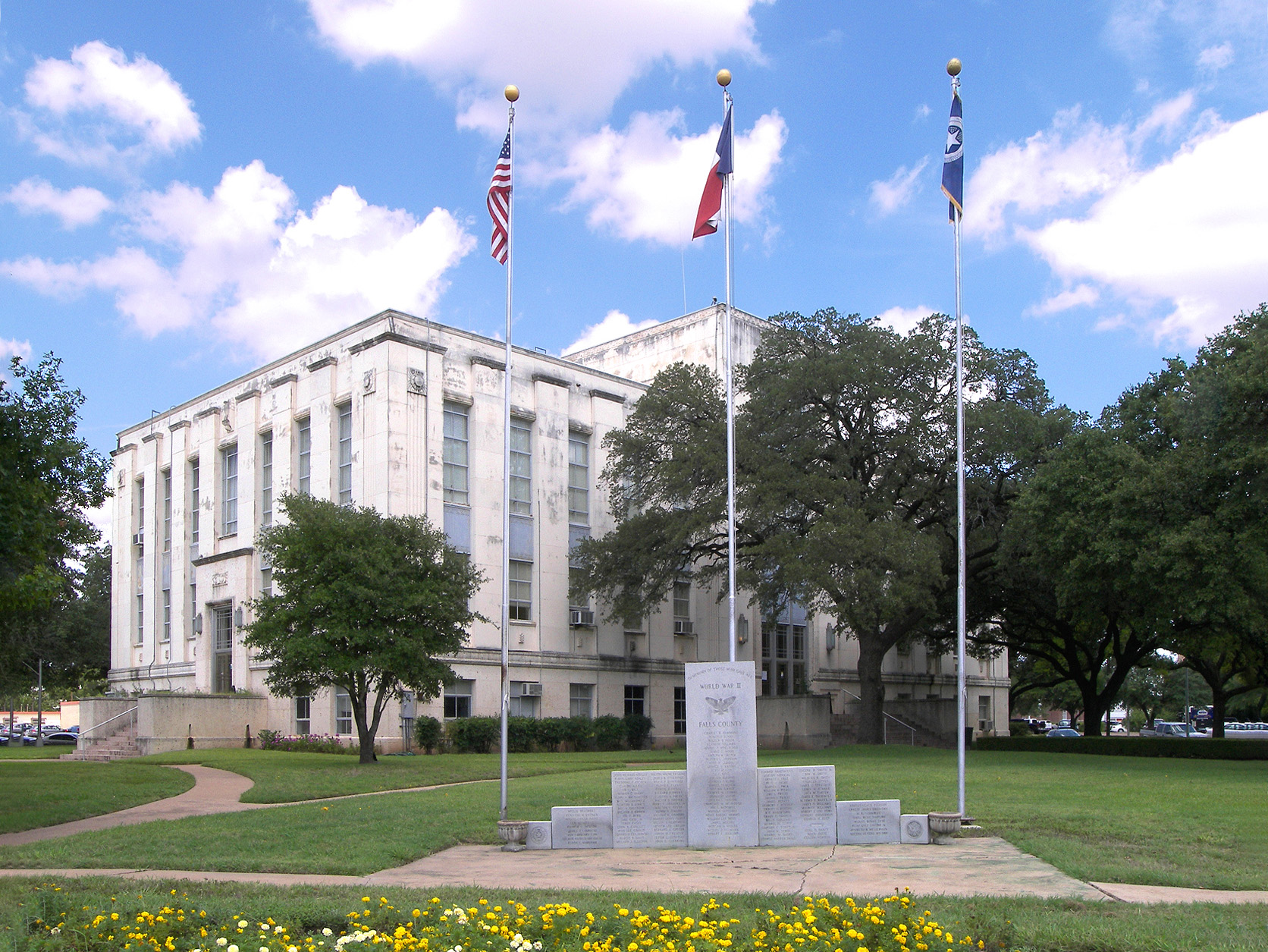
- The Falls County Courthouse in Marlin: The courthouse was added to the National Register of Historic Places on December 13, 2000.

- Flag

- Location within the U.S. state of Texas
- Coordinates: 31°16′N 96°56′W
- Country: United States
- State: Texas
- Founded: 1850
- Named for: Falls on the Brazos Park
- Seat: Marlin
- Largest city: Marlin

Area
  - Total: 774 sq mi (2,000 km^{2})
  - Land: 765 sq mi (1,980 km^{2})
  - Water: 8.4 sq mi (22 km^{2}) 1.1%

Population (2020)
  - Total: 16,968
  - Estimate (2025): 17,869 ▲
  - Density: 22.2/sq mi (8.56/km^{2})
- Time zone: UTC−6 (Central)
  - Summer (DST): UTC−5 (CDT)
- Congressional district: 17th
- Website: www.co.falls.tx.us

Falls County is a county in the U.S. state of Texas. As of the 2020 census, its population was 16,968. The county seat is Marlin. It is named for the original 10-foot-tall waterfalls on the Brazos River, which existed until the river changed course during a storm in 1866. The present falls are two miles northeast of the original falls, at the Falls on the Brazos Park, a camping site only a few miles out of Marlin on Farm to Market Road 712.

Falls County is part of the Waco metropolitan area.

With a large portion of its economy based on agriculture, Falls County is sixth among 254 Texas counties in corn production.

== History ==
=== Native Americans ===
The Brazos River Valley served as hunting grounds for several tribes, including Wacos, Tawakonis, and Anadarkos. The Comanches were often a more aggressive band, who forced other tribes off the land. The Tawakoni branch of Wichita Indians originated north of Texas, but migrated south into East Texas. From 1843 onward, the Tawakoni were part of treaties made by both the Republic of Texas and the United States.

The Cherokees arrived in the early 1830s. Sam Houston, adopted son of Chief Oolooteka (John Jolly) of the Cherokee, negotiated the February 1836 treaty between Chief Bowl of the Cherokees and the Republic of Texas.

January 1839, Falls County had two brutal massacres by the Anadarkos, under chief José María, at the homes of George Morgan and John Marlin. A retaliatory offensive by settlers was ineffective, and forced the group into a retreat.

In 1846, several tribes negotiated a treaty with the United States government.

=== Settlers ===
Empresarios Sterling C. Robertson and Robert Leftwich received a grant from the Coahuila y Tejas legislature to settle 800 families. By contracting how many families each grantee could settle, the government sought to have some control over colonization. Robertson began bringing American settlers to his Nashville colony (later called Robertson's Colony). Most of the settlers came from Alabama, Tennessee, and Mississippi. He named the capital of the Nashville colony Sarahville de Viesca. Fort Viesca was built in 1834, with a name change to Fort Milam in 1835. The settlement was deserted during the Runaway Scrape of 1836, and reoccupied after the Battle of San Jacinto.

=== County established and growth ===
The state legislature formed Falls County from Limestone and Milam Counties in 1850, and named it after the falls of the Brazos River. Marlin became the county seat.

By the census of 1860, the county had 1,716 slaves. Falls County voted in favor of secession from the Union. The county fared better during Reconstruction than most, perhaps due to its distance from areas subject to Union military occupation.

Marlin began to be known for the healing powers of its hot mineral waters by the 1890s. Conrad Hilton built the Falls Hotel, with a tunnel to a mineral bath, to accommodate the business generated by the hot spring.

The Houston and Texas Central Railway became the first railroad through the county around 1870. The Waco Division of the San Antonio and Aransas Pass Railway, in 1886–1925, had multiple stops in Falls County. In 1902, the Missouri Pacific Railroad passed through the county.

A log cabin served as the county's first courthouse in the 1850s, until the second courthouse was built of white cedar. The second courthouse burned in 1870. A third courthouse was built in 1876, but was damaged by a storm in 1886.

A fourth courthouse was built in 1888, which by the 1930s had greatly deteriorated. The concrete, brick, and stone fifth and present-day courthouse, designed by architect Arthur E. Thomas, was completed in 1939.

== Geography ==
According to the U.S. Census Bureau, the county has a total area of 774 sq mi (2,000 km^{2}), of which 765 sq mi (1,980 km^{2}) are land and 8.4 square miles (22 km^{2}) (1.1%) are covered by water.

=== Major highways ===
- Interstate 35 (two miles)
- U.S. Highway 77
- State Highway 6
- State Highway 7
- State Highway 14
- State Highway 53
- State Highway 320
- Loop 265

=== Adjacent counties ===
- Limestone County (northeast)
- Robertson County (southeast)
- Milam County (south)
- Bell County (southwest)
- McLennan County (northwest)

== Demographics ==
Historical population
Census	Pop.	Note	%±
1860	3,614		—
1870	9,851		172.6%
1880	16,240		64.9%
1890	20,706		27.5%
1900	33,342		61.0%
1910	35,649		6.9%
1920	36,217		1.6%
1930	38,771		7.1%
1940	35,984		−7.2%
1950	26,724		−25.7%
1960	21,263		−20.4%
1970	17,300		−18.6%
1980	17,946		3.7%
1990	17,712		−1.3%
2000	18,576		4.9%
2010	17,866		−3.8%
2020	16,968		−5.0%
2025 (est.)	17,869	▲	5.3%
U.S. Decennial Census; 1850–2010 2010 2020

=== Racial and ethnic composition ===
Falls County, Texas – Racial and ethnic composition Note: the US Census treats Hispanic/Latino as an ethnic category. This table excludes Latinos from the racial categories and assigns them to a separate category. Hispanics/Latinos may be of any race.
Race / Ethnicity (NH = Non-Hispanic)	Pop 1980	Pop 1990	Pop 2000	Pop 2010	Pop 2020	% 1980	% 1990	% 2000	% 2010	% 2020
White alone (NH)	11,363	10,843	10,364	9,381	8,707	63.32%	61.22%	55.79%	52.51%	51.31%
Black or African American alone (NH)	4,830	4,732	5,064	4,463	3,708	26.91%	26.72%	27.26%	24.98%	21.85%
Native American or Alaska Native alone (NH)	26	30	40	60	55	0.14%	0.17%	0.22%	0.34%	0.32%
Asian alone (NH)	21	20	20	46	51	0.12%	0.11%	0.11%	0.26%	0.30%
Native Hawaiian or Pacific Islander alone (NH)	x	x	4	10	8	x	x	0.02%	0.06%	0.05%
Other race alone (NH)	16	15	17	24	42	0.09%	0.08%	0.09%	0.13%	0.25%
Mixed race or Multiracial (NH)	x	x	126	166	432	x	x	0.68%	0.93%	2.55%
Hispanic or Latino (any race)	1,690	2,072	2,941	3,716	3,965	9.42%	11.70%	15.83%	20.80%	23.37%
Total	17,946	17,712	18,576	17,866	16,968	100.00%	100.00%	100.00%	100.00%	100.00%

=== 2020 census ===
As of the 2020 census, the county had a population of 16,968. The median age was 41.2 years. 20.8% of residents were under the age of 18 and 18.8% of residents were 65 years of age or older. For every 100 females there were 78.5 males, and for every 100 females age 18 and over there were 73.0 males.

The racial makeup of the county was 58.2% White, 22.3% Black or African American, 0.7% American Indian and Alaska Native, 0.3% Asian, <0.1% Native Hawaiian and Pacific Islander, 10.5% from some other race, and 7.9% from two or more races. Hispanic or Latino residents of any race comprised 23.4% of the population.

31.8% of residents lived in urban areas, while 68.2% lived in rural areas.

There were 5,958 households in the county, of which 29.6% had children under the age of 18 living in them. Of all households, 45.5% were married-couple households, 21.2% were households with a male householder and no spouse or partner present, and 28.2% were households with a female householder and no spouse or partner present. About 29.2% of all households were made up of individuals and 14.9% had someone living alone who was 65 years of age or older.

There were 7,420 housing units, of which 19.7% were vacant. Among occupied housing units, 71.6% were owner-occupied and 28.4% were renter-occupied. The homeowner vacancy rate was 1.3% and the rental vacancy rate was 11.0%.

=== 2000 census ===
As of the 2000 census 18,576 people, 6,496 households, and 4,410 families resided in the county. The population density was 24 people per square mile (9.3 people/km^{2}). The 7,658 housing units averaged 10 per square mile (3.9/km^{2}). The racial makeup of the county was 61.50% White, 27.45% Black or African American, 0.50% Native American, 0.11% Asian, 0.04% Pacific Islander, 8.81% from other races, and 1.59% from two or more races. About 15.83% of the population was Hispanic or Latino of any race.

Of the 6,496 households, 30.60% had children under 18 living with them, 48.20% were married couples living together, 15.60% had a female householder with no husband present, and 32.10% were not families. About 29.40% of all households was made up of individuals, and 15.40% had someone living alone who was 65 or older. The average household size was 2.54 and the average family size was 3.15.

In the county, the population was distributed as 27.6% under 18, 7.8% from 18 to 24, 27.00% from 25 to 44, 20.8% from 45 to 64, and 16.9% who were 65 or older. The median age was 36 years. For every 100 females, there were 85.80 males. For every 100 females age 18 and over, there were 74.40 males.

The median income for a household in the county was $26,589, and for a family was $32,666. Males had a median income of $27,042 versus $20,128 for females. The per capita income for the county was $14,311. About 18.80% of families and 22.60% of the population were below the poverty line, including 28.70% of those under 18 and 18.40% of those 65 or over.

== Government and infrastructure ==
The Texas Department of Criminal Justice (TDCJ) operates the Marlin Unit, a transfer facility for men, in the city of Marlin. The unit opened in June 1992 and was transferred to the Texas Youth Commission (TYC) in May 1995. When it was a part of TYC, the facility, then called the Marlin Orientation and Assessment Unit, served as the place of orientation for minors of both sexes being committed into the TYC's care, from the facility's opening in 1995 to its transfer out of TYC in 2007.

In September 2007, the facility was transferred back to the TDCJ. The TDCJ also operates the William P. Hobby Unit, a prison for women located southwest of Marlin in unincorporated Falls County.

=== Politics ===
United States presidential election results for Falls County, Texas
Year	Republican		Democratic		Third party(ies)	
Year	No.	%	No.	%	No.	%
1912	353	15.97%	1,663	75.25%	194	8.78%
1916	729	24.18%	2,037	67.56%	249	8.26%
1920	585	15.07%	1,878	48.36%	1,420	36.57%
1924	448	12.96%	2,817	81.51%	191	5.53%
1928	877	26.04%	2,484	73.75%	7	0.21%
1932	181	4.43%	3,896	95.40%	7	0.17%
1936	140	3.94%	3,411	95.92%	5	0.14%
1940	958	19.52%	3,949	80.46%	1	0.02%
1944	377	8.94%	3,191	75.63%	651	15.43%
1948	546	12.94%	3,385	80.25%	287	6.80%
1952	1,962	37.32%	3,287	62.53%	8	0.15%
1956	1,819	40.36%	2,674	59.33%	14	0.31%
1960	1,559	31.40%	3,399	68.46%	7	0.14%
1964	1,216	23.61%	3,933	76.35%	2	0.04%
1968	1,345	23.60%	2,990	52.47%	1,364	23.93%
1972	3,017	62.12%	1,825	37.57%	15	0.31%
1976	2,261	34.43%	4,277	65.13%	29	0.44%
1980	2,606	43.38%	3,328	55.40%	73	1.22%
1984	3,133	52.34%	2,834	47.34%	19	0.32%
1988	2,344	44.76%	2,877	54.94%	16	0.31%
1992	1,826	31.63%	2,761	47.83%	1,186	20.54%
1996	2,260	37.59%	3,256	54.16%	496	8.25%
2000	3,239	56.68%	2,417	42.29%	59	1.03%
2004	3,454	58.52%	2,427	41.12%	21	0.36%
2008	3,328	59.44%	2,225	39.74%	46	0.82%
2012	3,356	61.76%	2,033	37.41%	45	0.83%
2016	3,441	65.57%	1,684	32.09%	123	2.34%
2020	4,177	68.11%	1,899	30.96%	57	0.93%
2024	4,520	72.01%	1,713	27.29%	44	0.70%

United States Senate election results for Falls County, Texas1
Year	Republican		Democratic		Third party(ies)	
Year	No.	%	No.	%	No.	%
2024	4,351	69.44%	1,782	28.44%	133	2.12%

United States Senate election results for Falls County, Texas2
Year	Republican		Democratic		Third party(ies)	
Year	No.	%	No.	%	No.	%
2020	4,157	68.84%	1,787	29.59%	95	1.57%

Texas Gubernatorial election results for Falls County
Year	Republican		Democratic		Third party(ies)	
Year	No.	%	No.	%	No.	%
2022	3,480	74.00%	1,168	24.84%	55	1.17%

== Communities ==
=== Cities and towns ===
- Bruceville-Eddy (mostly in McLennan County)
- Golinda (small part in McLennan County)
- Lott
- Marlin (county seat)
- Rosebud

=== Census-designated place ===
- Chilton

=== Unincorporated communities ===
- Barclay
- Cedar Springs
- Cego
- Durango
- Highbank
- McClanahan
- Mooreville
- Perry
- Pleasant Grove
- Reagan
- Satin
- Stranger
- Tomlinson Hill
- Travis
- Westphalia
- Zipperlandville

== Education ==
School districts include:

- Bremond Independent School District
- Bruceville-Eddy Independent School District
- Chilton Independent School District
- Groesbeck Independent School District
- Lorena Independent School District
- Marlin Independent School District
- Mart Independent School District
- Riesel Independent School District
- Robinson Independent School District
- Rosebud-Lott Independent School District
- Troy Independent School District
- Westphalia Independent School District

All of Falls County is in the service area of McLennan Community College.

== In popular culture ==
Marlin has been a filming location for two movies: Leadbelly (1976) and Infamous (2006).

In 2013, a ranch in northeast Falls County near Mart, Texas, was the site of the series premiere of Treehouse Masters, in which a couple had a $200,000 treehouse built on their property.

== See also ==
- National Register of Historic Places listings in Falls County, Texas
- Recorded Texas Historic Landmarks in Falls County
