= Harmony, Texas =

- Unincorporated community
- Location within Texas Location within the United States
- Coordinates: 31°31′44″N 94°46′11″W
- Country: United States
- State: Texas
- County: Nacogdoches
- Elevation: 328 ft (100 m)
- Time zone: UTC-6 (Central (CST))
  - Summer (DST): UTC-5 (CDT)
- Area code: 936
- GNIS feature ID: 1383740

Harmony is an unincorporated community in Henderson County, located in the U.S. state of Texas. It is referenced in the novel RoseBlood by A.G. Howard, as well as by Jodi Thomas in her bestselling novels.
