= Rosebud-Lott Independent School District =

School district in Texas

Rosebud-Lott Independent School District is a consolidated public school district based in Lott, Texas, US. The school mascot is the Cougar.

The district also serves the cities of Rosebud and Lott, and most of Burlington, as well as the unincorporated area of Westphalia. Located in Falls County, small portions of the district extend into Bell and Milam counties.

In 2009, the school district was rated "academically acceptable" by the Texas Education Agency.

== Schools ==
- Rosebud-Lott High School (Grades 9–12)
- Rosebud-Lott Middle School (Grades 7–8)
- Rosebud-Lott Elementary School (Grades Pre-K – 6th)
