= Bruceville-Eddy, Texas =

- City
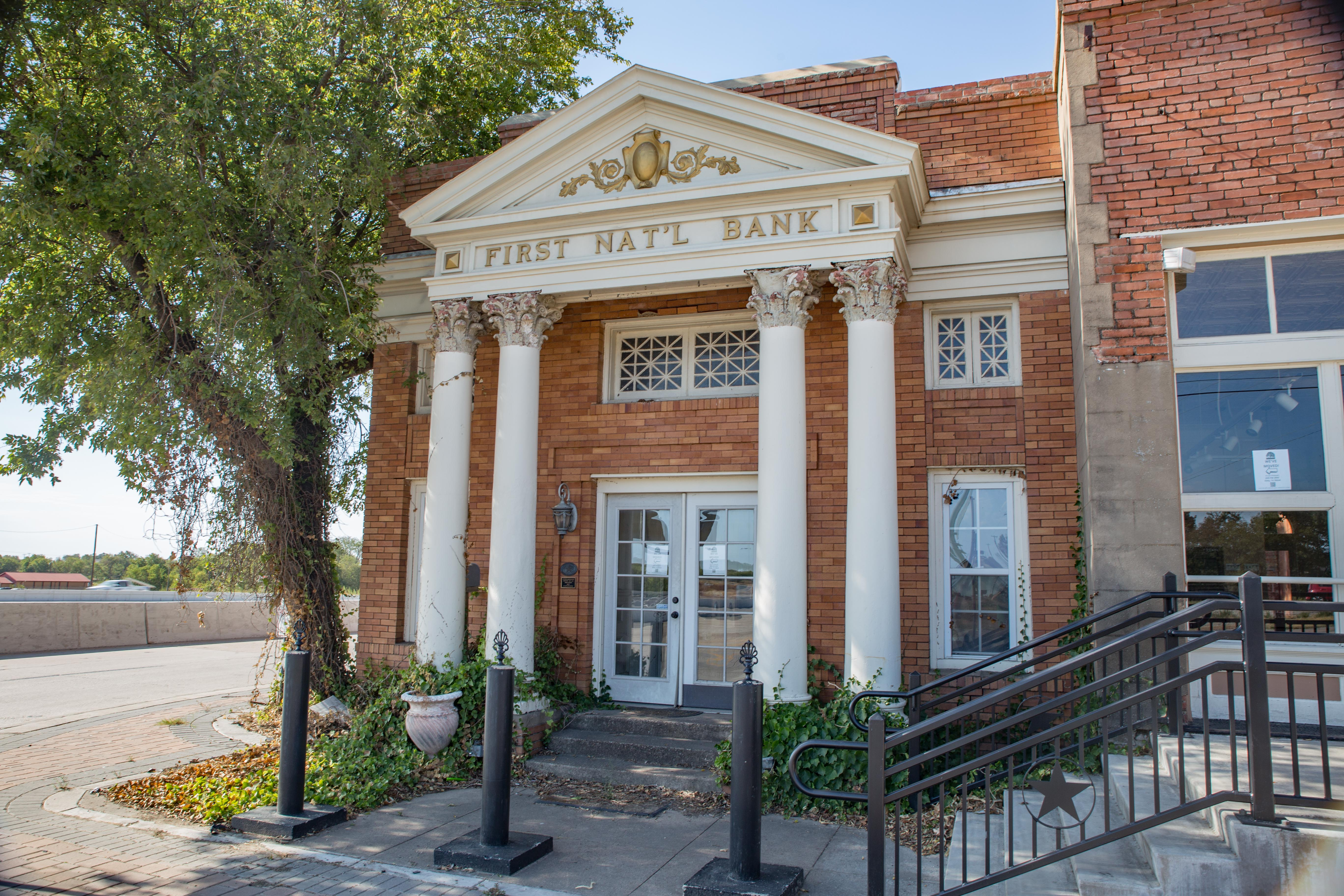
- First National Bank building
- Interactive map of Bruceville-Eddy, Texas
- Coordinates: 31°18′20″N 97°15′13″W
- Country: United States
- State: Texas
- Counties: McLennan, Falls

Government
  - Type: Mayor-Council

Area
  - Total: 4.12 sq mi (10.67 km^{2})
  - Land: 4.11 sq mi (10.65 km^{2})
  - Water: 0.0077 sq mi (0.02 km^{2})
- Elevation: 686 ft (209 m)

Population (2020)
  - Total: 1,413
  - Density: 412.7/sq mi (159.36/km^{2})
- Time zone: UTC-6 (Central (CST))
  - Summer (DST): UTC-5 (CDT)
- ZIP code: 76630 (Bruceville), 76524 (Eddy)
- Area code: 254
- FIPS code: 48-10828
- GNIS feature ID: 1385216
- Website: bruceville-eddy.us

Bruceville-Eddy is a city in McLennan and Falls counties in the U.S. state of Texas. Its population was 1,413 at the 2020 census.

Most of the city is in McLennan County and is part of the Waco metropolitan statistical area. A small southern portion is in Falls County.

== Geography ==
Bruceville-Eddy is located in southwestern McLennan County and is situated along Interstate 35, 18 miles (29 km) south of Waco and 16 miles (26 km) north of Temple. Access is available from Exit 315 (the Eddy or southern end of town) and Exit 318 (the Bruceville or northern end). Texas State Highway 7 leads east from Exit 315 22 miles (35 km) to Marlin.

According to the United States Census Bureau, the city has a total area of 3.2 square miles (8.3 km^{2}), all land.

== History ==
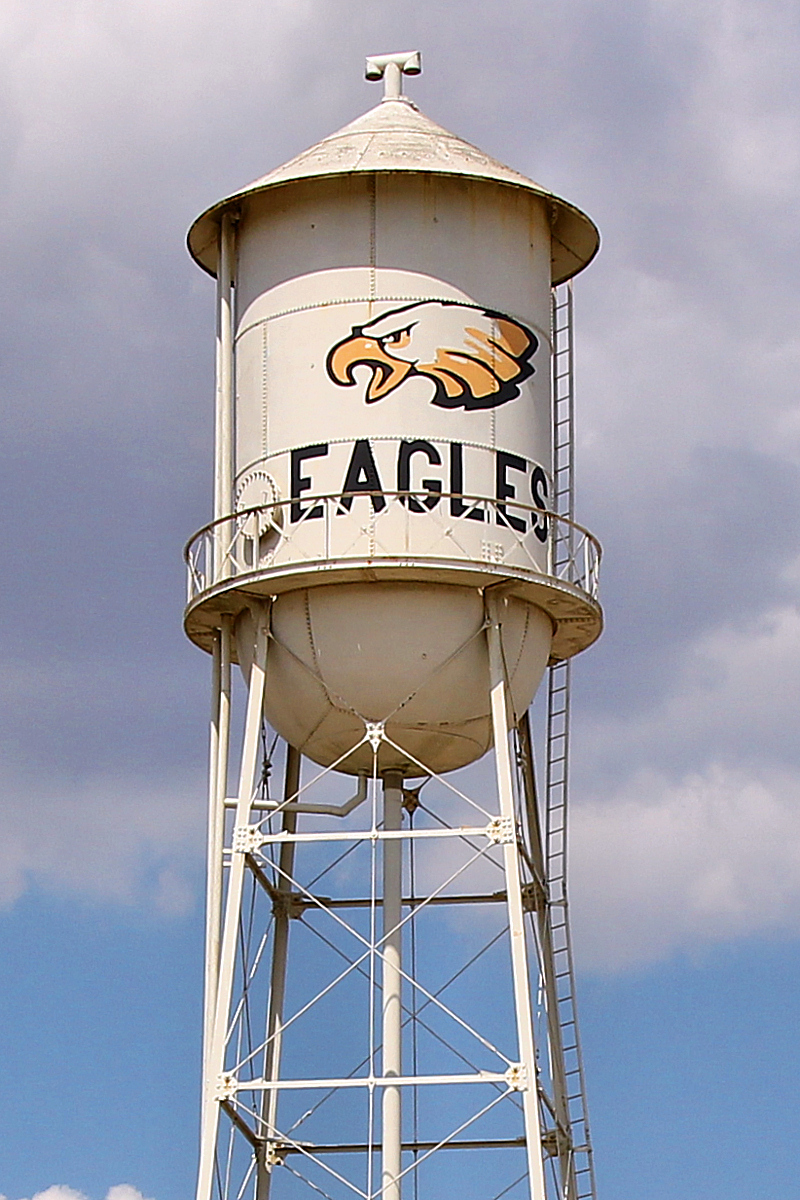
The water tower in Bruceville-Eddy highlighting the high school's mascot

The community of Bruceville-Eddy began as two separate settlements: Bruceville and Eddy. Both communities became stations on the Missouri–Kansas–Texas Railroad (Katy Railroad) in 1882.

=== Bruceville ===
Bruceville was named for Lucien N. Bruce, who donated land for the railroad station. Most of Bruceville's residents came from the community of Mastersville, located two miles to the north, that the railroad had bypassed. By 1900, Bruceville had approximately 289 residents and several businesses. An independent school district was formed in 1904. A bank operated in Bruceville from 1907 to 1927. The community had a population around 500 during the 1930s and 1940s, but began to decline in the postwar years. By 1964, the number of inhabitants had fallen to 175 and decreased to just 25 in 1970.

=== Eddy ===
Initially known as "Marvin", the community was renamed after the railroad arrived in 1882, to honor rail division superintendent Everett B. Eddy. By the mid-1880s, the community was home to 150 people, three general stores, two churches, a school, and a gristmill. Throughout the 1890s, Eddy continued to experience rapid growth, with some estimates placing the total population as high as 700. A bank opened in 1901 and received a national charter in 1915. In 1928, the schools in Bruceville and Eddy were consolidated, the first such merger in McLennan County. By the late 1920s, Eddy had roughly 450 residents. The population declined to 350 by the mid-1940s, but rose to around 600 in the 1960s as road improvements made commuting easier for locals.

=== Incorporation ===
In April 1974, the communities of Bruceville and Eddy incorporated as a single entity known as Bruceville-Eddy. The population stood at 1,038 in 1980 and grew slightly to 1,075 by 1990. That figure rose further, to 1,490, by 2000.

Owing to its unique history, Bruceville-Eddy operated two separate post offices after it was incorporated. Eddy's post office, located at 100 Franklin Road, operates under the ZIP code 76524. The post office in Bruceville was located at 203 First Street and had the ZIP code 76630. On June 1, 2009, it was closed due to foundation problems that caused the building to be deemed unsafe. All postal operations were transferred to Eddy.

== Demographics ==
Historical population
Census	Pop.	Note	%±
1980	1,038		—
1990	1,075		3.6%
2000	1,490		38.6%
2010	1,475		−1.0%
2020	1,413		−4.2%
U.S. Decennial Census

=== 2020 census ===
As of the 2020 census, Bruceville-Eddy had a population of 1,413 and 412 families residing in the city. The median age was 42.0 years. 22.3% of residents were under the age of 18 and 17.4% of residents were 65 years of age or older. For every 100 females there were 107.5 males, and for every 100 females age 18 and over there were 100.7 males age 18 and over.

0% of residents lived in urban areas, while 100.0% lived in rural areas.

There were 529 households in Bruceville-Eddy, of which 32.3% had children under the age of 18 living in them. Of all households, 50.9% were married-couple households, 20.0% were households with a male householder and no spouse or partner present, and 22.5% were households with a female householder and no spouse or partner present. About 21.4% of all households were made up of individuals and 10.6% had someone living alone who was 65 years of age or older.

There were 578 housing units, of which 8.5% were vacant. Among occupied housing units, 76.4% were owner-occupied and 23.6% were renter-occupied. The homeowner vacancy rate was 0.2% and the rental vacancy rate was 10.6%.

Racial composition as of the 2020 census
Race	Percent
White	80.3%
Black or African American	2.1%
American Indian and Alaska Native	0.2%
Asian	0.8%
Native Hawaiian and Other Pacific Islander	0%
Some other race	5.9%
Two or more races	10.7%
Hispanic or Latino (of any race)	17.3%

=== 2000 census ===
As of the census of 2000, 1,490 people, 543 households, and 432 families were residing in the city. The population density was 460.8 people/sq mi (178.1/km^{2}). The 587 housing units averaged 181.5/sq mi (70.2/km^{2}). The racial makeup of the city was 89.73% White, 0.81% African American, 0.67% Native American, 0.07% Asian, 6.51% from other races, and 2.21% from two or more races. Hispanics or Latinos of any race were 10.34% of the population.

Of the 543 households, 37.2% had children under 18 living with them, 65.0% were married couples living together, 9.0% had a female householder with no husband present, and 20.4% were not families. About 18.2% of all households were made up of individuals, and 9.2% had someone living alone who was 65 or older. The average household size was 2.74, and the average family size was 3.10.

The city's age distribution was 29.7% under 18, 5.9% from 18 to 24, 30.3% from 25 to 44, 21.7% from 45 to 64, and 12.3% who were 65 or older. The median age was 35 years. For every 100 females, there were 94.3 males. For every 100 females age 18 and over, there were 96.6 males.

The median household income was $36,089, and the median family income was $39,766. Males had a median income of $30,139 versus $19,125 for females. The per capita income for the city was $15,642. About 9.4% of families and 11.8% of the population were below the poverty line, including 16.8% of those under age 18 and 9.9% of those age 65 or over.

== Education ==
The city of Bruceville-Eddy is served by the Bruceville-Eddy Independent School District.

All of McLennan County and all of Falls County are in the service area of McLennan Community College.

== Notable person ==
- Tony Duran (1945–2011), musician who served in Frank Zappa's backing band
