= Cego, Texas =

- Unincorporated community
- Location within Texas Location within the United States
- Coordinates: 31°14′43″N 97°09′45″W
- Country: United States of America
- State: Texas
- County: Falls
- Elevation: 505 ft (154 m)

Population (2000)
  - Total: 42
- Time zone: UTC-6 (Central (CST))
  - Summer (DST): UTC-5 (CDT)
- ZIP code: 76524
- Area code: 254
- FIPS code: 48-48309
- GNIS feature ID: 1354172
- Other name: Ceso

Cego is an unincorporated community in western Falls County, Texas, United States. Cego is located on Farm to Market Road 1950. As of 2000, the population was 42.
