= Lott, Texas =

- City
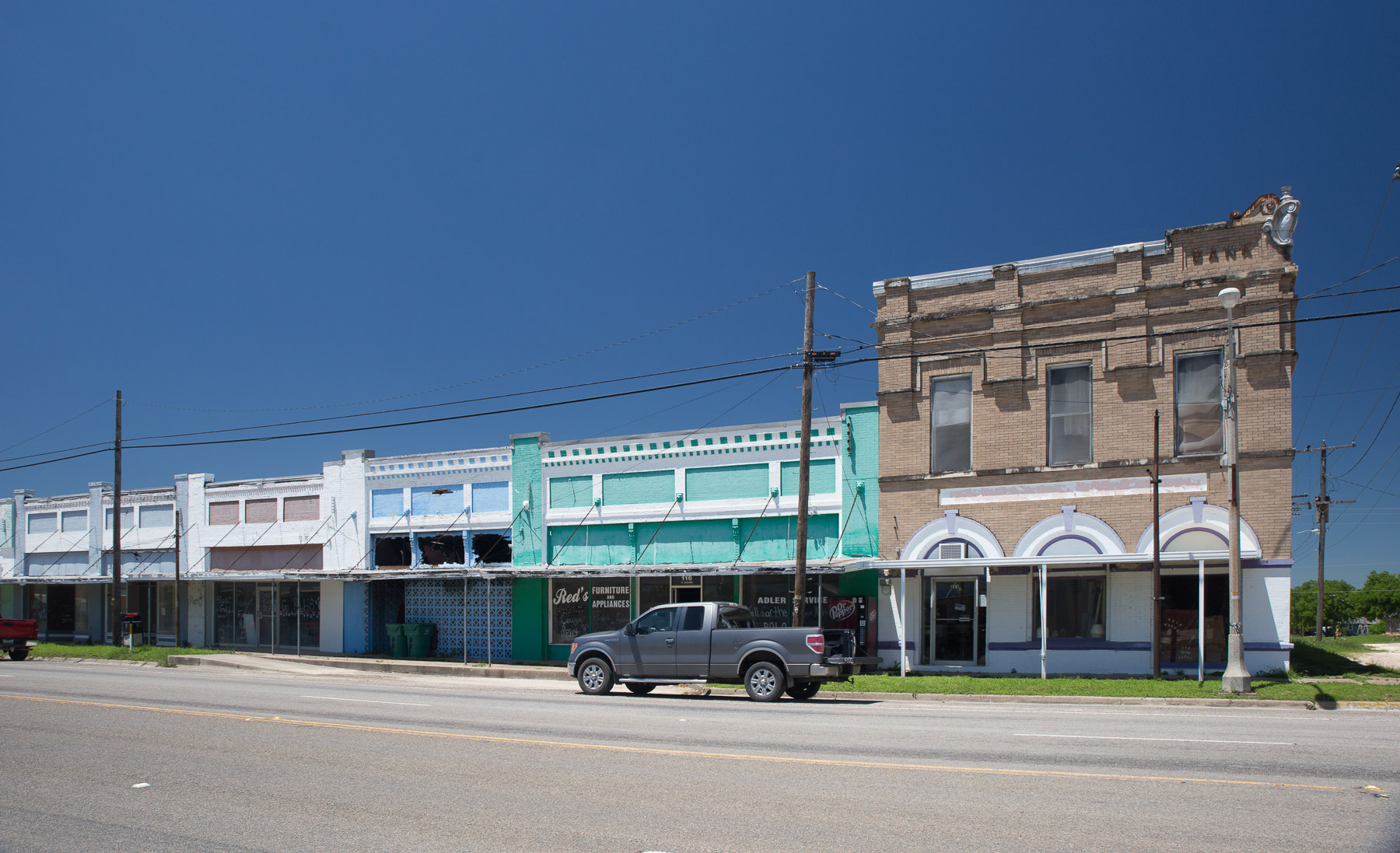
- Downtown Lott

- Location within Falls County and Texas
- Coordinates: 31°12′21″N 97°02′00″W
- Country: United States of America
- State: Texas
- County: Falls

Area
  - Total: 1.02 sq mi (2.65 km^{2})
  - Land: 1.01 sq mi (2.62 km^{2})
  - Water: 0.015 sq mi (0.04 km^{2})
- Elevation: 535 ft (163 m)

Population (2020)
  - Total: 644
  - Density: 735/sq mi (283.6/km^{2})
- Time zone: UTC-6 (Central (CST))
  - Summer (DST): UTC-5 (CDT)
- ZIP code: 76656
- Area code: 254
- FIPS code: 48-44176
- GNIS feature ID: 2410883

Lott is a city in Falls County, Texas, United States. As of the 2020 census, the city population was 644.

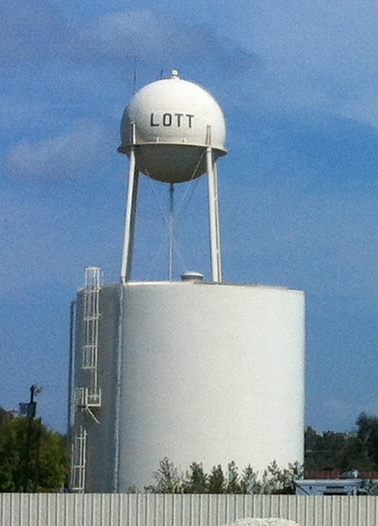
Old and new watertowers

== History ==
The Texas Townsite Company bought the land in 1889. When the San Antonio and Aransas Pass Railway was built through the area in 1890, Lott was founded; it was named in honor of Uriah Lott, president of the railroad. A post office was established at the settlement in 1890, with S. J. Crump as postmaster. When the community was incorporated by unanimous vote later that year, its population was estimated at more than 200. By 1892 Lott had Baptist, Methodist, and Presbyterian churches, two cotton gins and gristmills, a weekly newspaper, and 350 residents. Its population estimates were as high as 1,200 by the end of the 1890s. Lott continued to prosper throughout the first part of the 20th century when the town developed into a well-known speed trap, securing the town's primary revenue source to the present day. The First National Bank of Lott was established in 1903, and the Lott State Bank was chartered in 1909. Local businesses did well, and residents were optimistic about the community's future growth. Lott's economy received an additional boost in the 1920s when State Highway 44 (later U.S. 77) built through the community. The Great Depression, however, brought significant changes. In 1933, the First National Bank of Lott went into receivership and did not reopen. During the mid-1930s, many local families had to accept government relief to make ends meet, although the Public Works Administration and the Works Progress provided some residents with jobs on street and water works.

Cotton and corn were for many years the staple crops of area farmers, but government subsidies encouraged diversification into stock raising and truck farming. The population of the community was reported as 921 in the 1930s; it rose to 1,021 in the 1940s, but fell to 956 by the early 1950s. Lott lost its rail service in 1967, when the Southern Pacific abandoned the section of track between Waco and Rosebud. Population estimates for Lott fluctuated between 750 and 950 residents from the 1960s through the 1980s, and the number of businesses fell steadily, from 45 in the 1940s to 12 in the 1980s. Thirteen businesses and 828 residents were reported in Lott at the end of the 1980s. In 1990, its population was estimated at 775.

In June 2015, a TV station reported that the cities of Calvert, Franklin, Hearne, and Lott in a "Texas Triangle" were using their police departments to issue numerous speeding tickets to turn their municipal court into a "cash cow".

== Geography ==
Lott is located southwest of the center of Falls County on high ground between the north-flowing Little Deer Creek and the south-flowing Cottonwood Creek, both tributaries of the Brazos River.

U.S. Route 77 passes through the city, leading north 26 miles (42 km) to Waco and south 25 miles (40 km) to Cameron. Texas State Highway 320 crosses US 77 at the west edge of downtown; it leads northeast 11 miles (18 km) to Marlin and southwest 14 miles (23 km) to Zabcikville.

According to the United States Census Bureau, the city of Lott has a total area of 1.0 square mile (2.7 km^{2}), of which 0.02 square miles (0.04 km^{2}), or 1.40%, is water.

== Demographics ==
Historical population
Census	Pop.	Note	%±
1900	614		—
1910	1,021		66.3%
1920	1,093		7.1%
1930	921		−15.7%
1940	1,021		10.9%
1950	956		−6.4%
1960	924		−3.3%
1970	799		−13.5%
1980	865		8.3%
1990	775		−10.4%
2000	724		−6.6%
2010	759		4.8%
2020	644		−15.2%
U.S. Decennial Census

=== 2020 census ===
As of the 2020 census, Lott had a population of 644. The median age was 40.5 years. 26.1% of residents were under the age of 18 and 19.4% of residents were 65 years of age or older. For every 100 females there were 102.5 males, and for every 100 females age 18 and over there were 88.1 males age 18 and over.

0.0% of residents lived in urban areas, while 100.0% lived in rural areas.

There were 265 households in Lott, of which 30.9% had children under the age of 18 living in them. Of all households, 38.5% were married-couple households, 20.8% were households with a male householder and no spouse or partner present, and 36.6% were households with a female householder and no spouse or partner present. About 35.9% of all households were made up of individuals and 18.9% had someone living alone who was 65 years of age or older.

There were 340 housing units, of which 22.1% were vacant. The homeowner vacancy rate was 4.0% and the rental vacancy rate was 17.6%.

Racial composition as of the 2020 census
Race	Number	Percent
White	436	67.7%
Black or African American	107	16.6%
American Indian and Alaska Native	4	0.6%
Asian	1	0.2%
Native Hawaiian and Other Pacific Islander	0	0.0%
Some other race	39	6.1%
Two or more races	57	8.9%
Hispanic or Latino (of any race)	122	18.9%

(Note: Note: the US Census treats Hispanic/Latino as an ethnic category. This table excludes Latinos from the racial categories and assigns them to a separate category. Hispanics/Latinos can be of any race.)

=== 2000 census ===
As of the census of 2000, there were 724 people, 299 households, and 196 families residing in the city. The population density was 699.3 inhabitants per square mile (270.0/km^{2}). There were 343 housing units at an average density of 331.3 per square mile (127.9/km^{2}). The racial makeup of the city was 71.69% White, 20.99% African American, 0.14% Asian, 4.97% from other races, and 2.21% from two or more races. Hispanic or Latino of any race were 9.25% of the population.

There were 299 households, out of which 33.8% had children under the age of 18 living with them, 40.1% were married couples living together, 22.7% had a female householder with no husband present, and 34.4% were non-families. 31.8% of all households were made up of individuals, and 17.4% had someone living alone who was 65 years of age or older. The average household size was 2.42 and the average family size was 3.07.

In the city, the population was spread out, with 29.0% under the age of 18, 6.9% from 18 to 24, 24.6% from 25 to 44, 22.1% from 45 to 64, and 17.4% who were 65 years of age or older. The median age was 37 years. For every 100 females, there were 88.5 males. For every 100 females age 18 and over, there were 76.0 males.

The median income for a household in the city was $22,875, and the median income for a family was $27,500. Males had a median income of $25,556 versus $19,318 for females. The per capita income for the city was $10,650. About 27.1% of families and 27.1% of the population were below the poverty line, including 32.2% of those under age 18 and 25.0% of those age 65 or over.

== Education ==
The City of Lott is served by the Rosebud-Lott Independent School District.

== Photo gallery ==
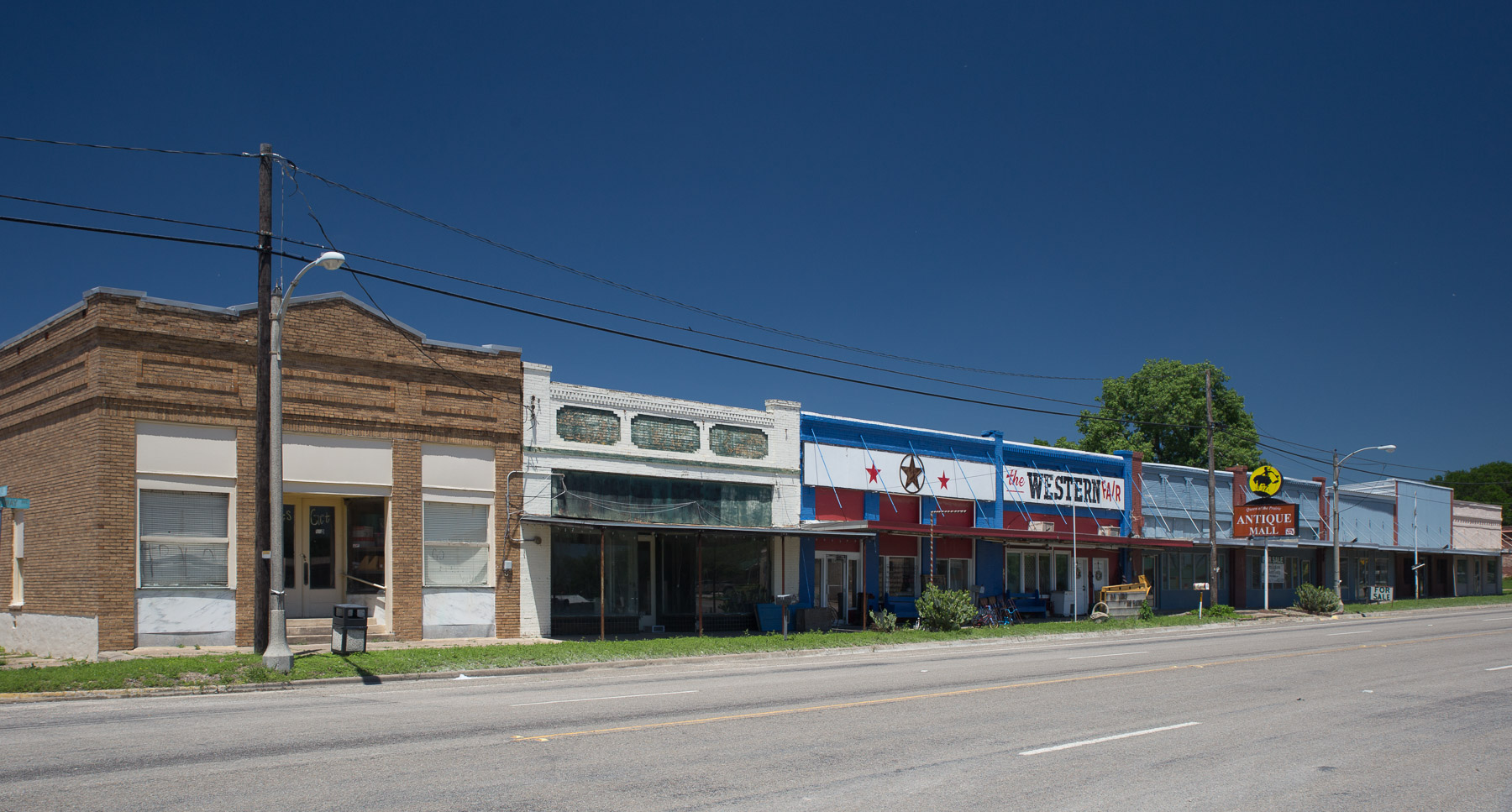
Downtown Lott, Texas

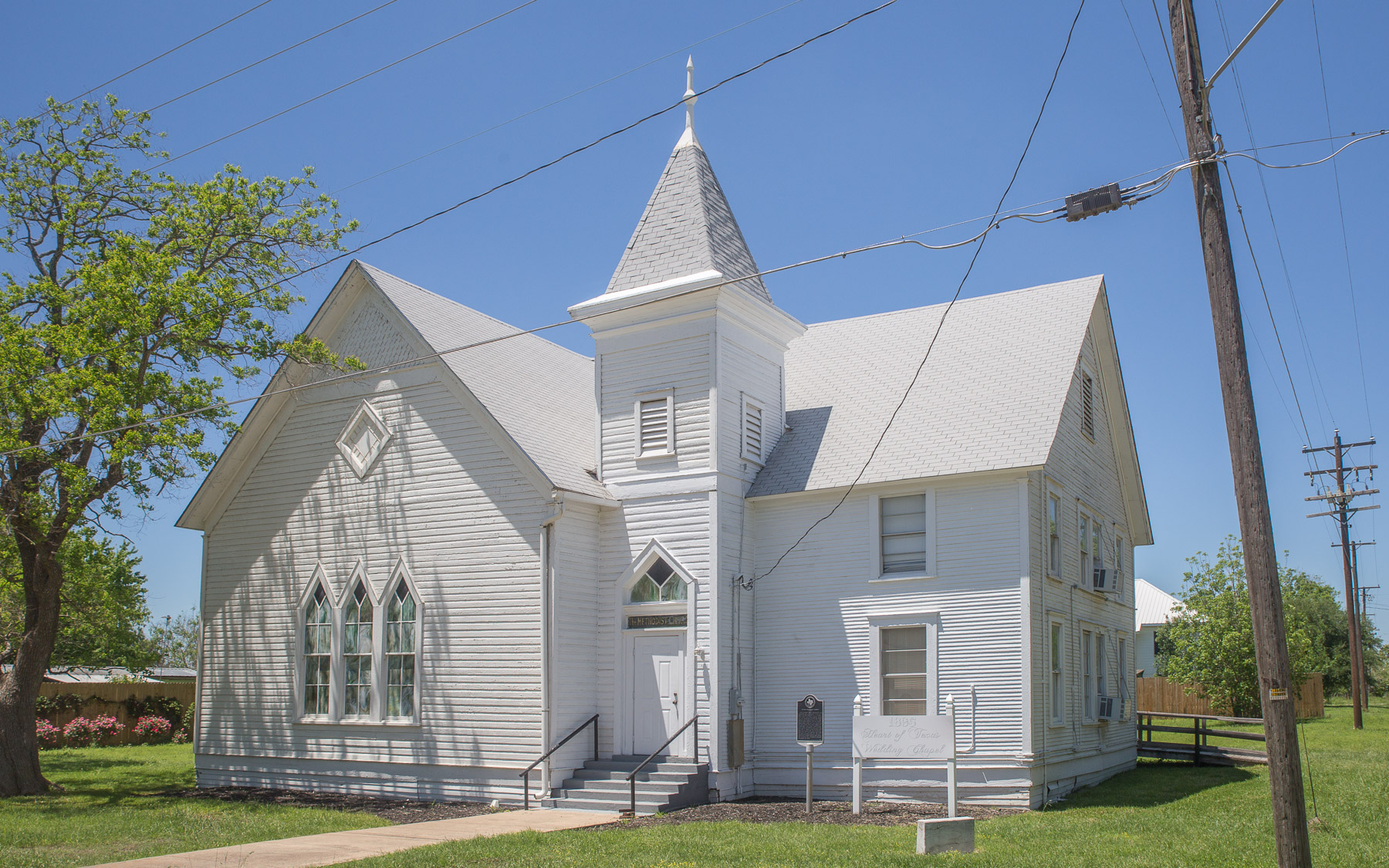
United Methodist Church
