= Rosebud, Texas =

- City
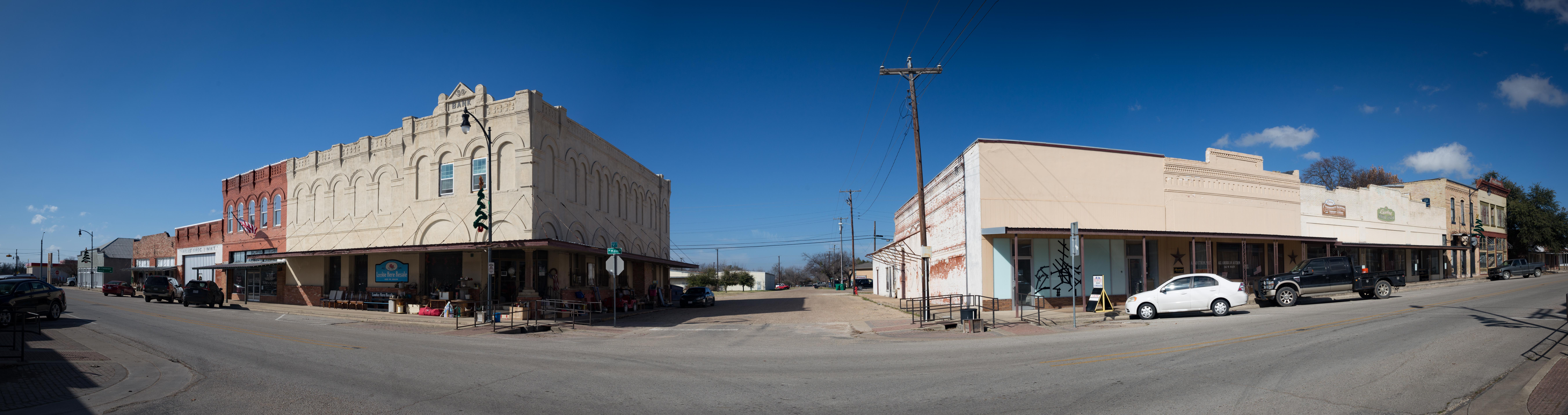
- Downtown Rosebud

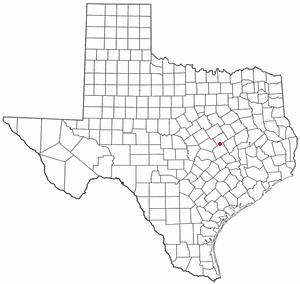
- Location of Rosebud, Texas

- Coordinates: 31°04′32″N 96°58′30″W
- Country: United States of America
- State: Texas
- County: Falls

Area
  - Total: 0.81 sq mi (2.09 km^{2})
  - Land: 0.80 sq mi (2.08 km^{2})
  - Water: 0 sq mi (0.00 km^{2})
- Elevation: 407 ft (124 m)

Population (2020)
  - Total: 1,296
  - Density: 1,678.0/sq mi (647.89/km^{2})
- Time zone: UTC-6 (Central (CST))
  - Summer (DST): UTC-5 (CDT)
- ZIP code: 76570
- Area code: 254
- FIPS code: 48-63188
- GNIS feature ID: 2410996
- Website: www.rosebudtexas.us

Rosebud is a city in Falls County, Texas, United States. Its population was 1,296 at the 2020 census.

== City landmarks ==
Rosebud is the home of the "Rosebud Christmas tree", a 170-ft-tall artificial tree located at 128 W. Main St. The tree was erected by Bell Falls Milam Electric Co-op in the early 1960s. BFM was then bought out by Heart of Texas Electric Co-op. In December 2013, the facility was purchased by M6 Oilfield Rentals and Mfg, LLC, as a development site and regional distribution center. Owner Kenny Ray Murray has indicated that the tree is a Rosebud city icon and a community tradition that will remain as long as the town itself.

== Geography ==
Rosebud is located in southwestern Falls County. U.S. Route 77 passes through the center of town as 5th Street, leading north 36 miles (58 km) to Waco and south 15 miles (24 km) to Cameron. Texas State Highway 53 leads west 24 miles (39 km) to Temple, intersecting US 77 just north of Rosebud.

According to the United States Census Bureau, the city has a total area of 0.77 square miles (2.0 km^{2}), all land.

=== Climate ===
The climate in this area is characterized by hot, humid summers and generally mild to cool winters. According to the Köppen climate classification system, Rosebud has a humid subtropical climate, Cfa on climate maps.

== Demographics ==
Historical population
Census	Pop.	Note	%±
1910	1,472		—
1920	1,516		3.0%
1930	1,565		3.2%
1940	1,842		17.7%
1950	1,730		−6.1%
1960	1,644		−5.0%
1970	1,592		−3.2%
1980	2,076		30.4%
1990	1,638		−21.1%
2000	1,493		−8.9%
2010	1,412		−5.4%
2020	1,296		−8.2%
U.S. Decennial Census

=== 2020 census ===
As of the 2020 census, Rosebud had 1,296 people, 496 households, and 308 families residing in the city, and the median age was 42.3 years. 23.6% of residents were under the age of 18 and 21.8% of residents were 65 years of age or older. For every 100 females there were 84.1 males, and for every 100 females age 18 and over there were 86.1 males age 18 and over. There were 496 households in Rosebud, of which 35.3% had children under the age of 18 living in them. Of all households, 41.3% were married-couple households, 19.8% were households with a male householder and no spouse or partner present, and 33.1% were households with a female householder and no spouse or partner present. About 30.0% of all households were made up of individuals and 17.6% had someone living alone who was 65 years of age or older. There were 608 housing units, of which 18.4% were vacant. The homeowner vacancy rate was 2.0% and the rental vacancy rate was 9.3%. 0.0% of residents lived in urban areas, while 100.0% lived in rural areas.

Racial composition as of the 2020 census
Race	Number	Percent
White	840	64.8%
Black or African American	227	17.5%
American Indian and Alaska Native	5	0.4%
Asian	9	0.7%
Native Hawaiian and Other Pacific Islander	0	0.0%
Some other race	115	8.9%
Two or more races	100	7.7%
Hispanic or Latino (of any race)	410	31.6%

=== 2000 census ===
As of the census of 2000, 1,493 people, 571 households, and 379 families resided in the city. The population density was 1,919.2 inhabitants per square mile (741.0/km^{2}). The 673 housing units averaged 865.1 per square mile (333.1/km^{2}). The racial makeup of the city was 59.14% White, 18.29% African American, 0.13% Native American, 0.07% Asian, 0.27% Pacific Islander, 19.16% from other races, and 2.95% from two or more races. Hispanics or Latinos of any race were 29.74% of the population.

Of the 571 households, 31.7% had children under the age of 18 living with them, 45.4% were married couples living together, 17.0% had a female householder with no husband present, and 33.6% were not families. About 32.0% of all households were made up of individuals, and 20.3% had someone living alone who was 65 years of age or older. The average household size was 2.53 and the average family size was 3.21.

In the city, the population was distributed as 28.8% under the age of 18, 6.6% from 18 to 24, 21.8% from 25 to 44, 20.8% from 45 to 64, and 22.0% who were 65 years of age or older. The median age was 40 years. For every 100 females, there were 90.9 males. For every 100 females age 18 and over, there were 78.1 males.

The median income for a household in the city was $24,063, and for a family was $33,300. Males had a median income of $25,662 versus $18,462 for females. The per capita income for the city was $13,577. About 21.0% of families and 24.5% of the population were below the poverty line, including 30.5% of those under age 18 and 22.7% of those age 65 or over.

== Education ==
It is in the Rosebud-Lott Independent School District.

== Photo gallery ==
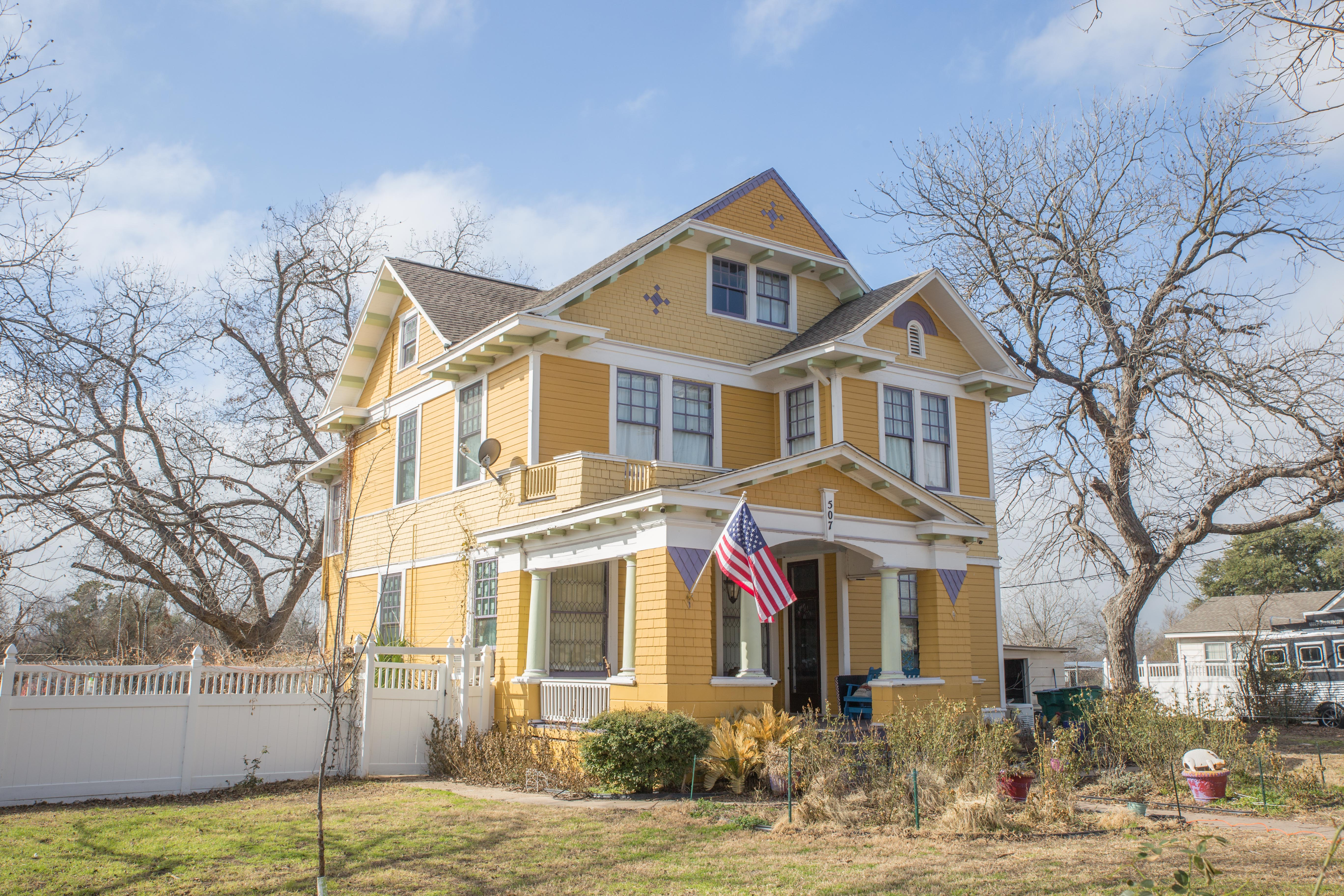
Henslee House

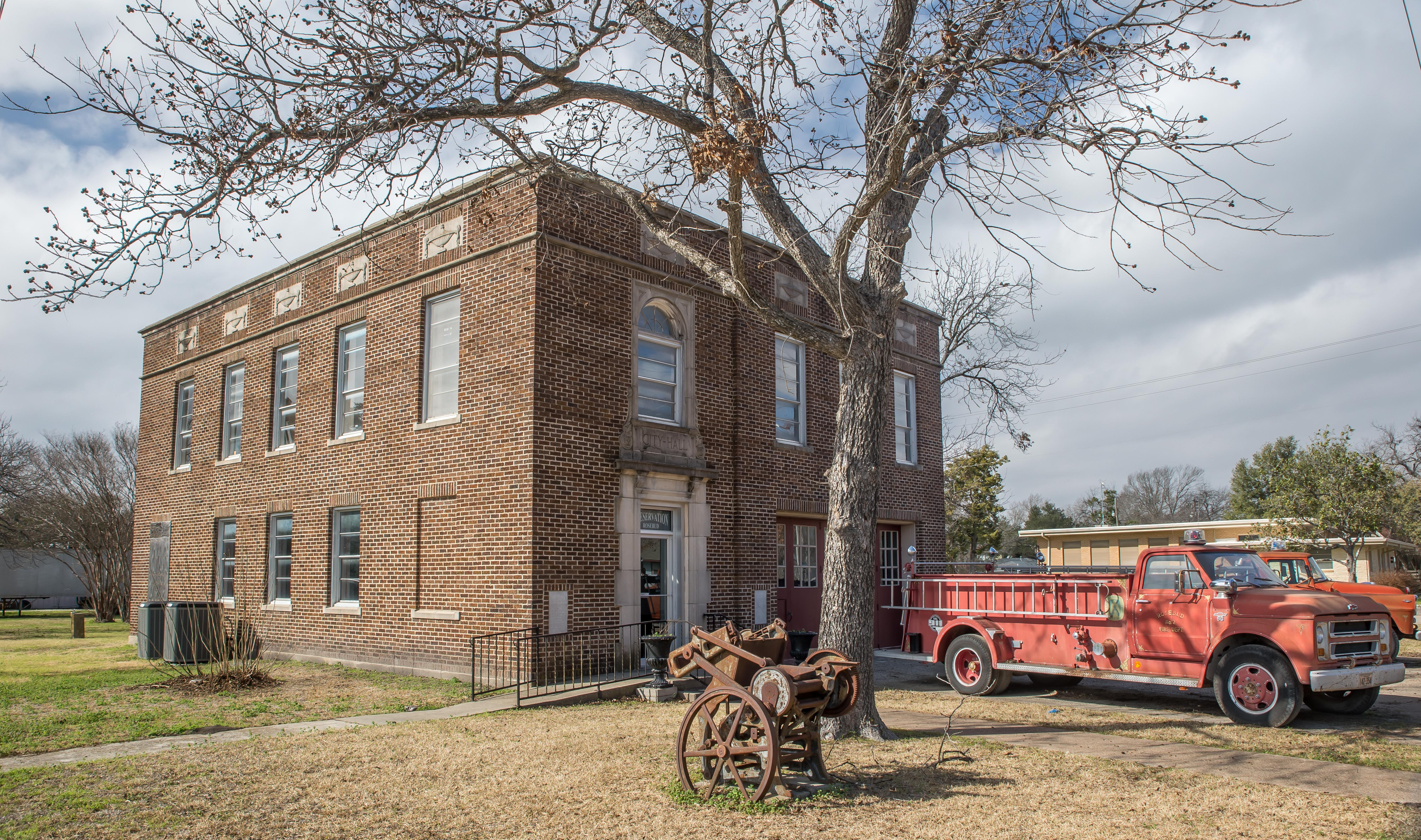
Old City Hall building

== Notable people ==
- Greg Knox (born 1963), from Rosebud, is an American football coach.
- Kenneth McDuff, the Broomstick Killer, was a serial killer in Texas
- LaDainian Tomlinson, Hall of Fame running back
- A. D. Whitfield Jr. (born 1943), is a former American football running back
