= Troy (disambiguation) =

Troy was a legendary city described in Homer's Iliad.

Troy may also refer to:

== Names ==
- Troy (given name)
- Troy (surname)

== Media ==
- Troy (film), a 2004 film by Wolfgang Petersen
- Troy (TV series), a British TV series presented by Troy Von Scheibner
- Troy: Fall of a City, a British miniseries
- Troy (BBC radio drama), a 1998 series of radio plays by Andrew Rissik

== Literature ==
- Troy (novel), a 2000 young adult novel by Adèle Geras
- Troy, a short story collection by Simon Brown (2006)
- Troy series, a 2005–2007 trilogy of novels by David Gemmell
- Troy, a fictional world in which Lanfeust of Troy takes place

== Music ==
- Troy (opera), a 2018 Turkish opera
- "Troy" (song), a 1987 song by Sinéad O'Connor from The Lion and the Cobra
- "They Reminisce Over You (T.R.O.Y.)", a 1992 rap song by Pete Rock and CL Smooth from Mecca and the Soul Brother
- "Troy", a 1990 song by Robin Holcomb from Robin Holcomb
- "Troy", a 1984 song by The Sugarhill Gang from Livin' in the Fast Lane

== Games ==
- Troy (game), a 1977 board wargame that simulates the Siege of Troy
- Troy (chess variant), a chess variant created by the Fanaat games club

== Places ==
=== Canada ===
- Troy, Municipality of the County of Inverness, Nova Scotia

=== United Kingdom ===
- Troy Town or Troy, some turf mazes in England
- Fowey, Cornwall or Troy Town
- Troy Town on St Agnes, Isles of Scilly, the southernmost settlement in the UK

=== United States ===
- Shorewood, Illinois, originally named Troy
- Troy, Alabama
  - Troy University
- Troy, Arizona
- Troy, Idaho
- Troy, Illinois
- Troy, Indiana
- Troy, Iowa
- Troy Mills, Iowa
- Troy, Kansas
- Troy, Jessamine County, Kentucky
- Troy, Woodford County, Kentucky
- Troy, Maine
- Troy (Dorsey, Maryland), a historic house
- Troy, Michigan
- Troy, Minnesota
- Troy, Missouri
- Troy, Montana
- Troy, New Hampshire, a New England town
  - Troy (CDP), New Hampshire, the main village in the town
- Troy, New York
  - Troy University (New York)
- Troy, North Carolina
- Troy, Ohio
- Troy, Pennsylvania
- Troy, South Carolina
- Troy, South Dakota
- Troy, Tennessee
- Troy, Texas
- Troy, Sauk County, Wisconsin, a town
- Troy, St. Croix County, Wisconsin, a town
- Troy, Walworth County, Wisconsin, a town
  - Troy (community), Walworth County, Wisconsin, unincorporated community in the town
  - Troy Center, Wisconsin, unincorporated community in the town
- Troy, Vermont, a New England town
  - Troy (CDP), Vermont, village within the town
- Troy, Virginia
- Troy, West Virginia

== Vessels ==
- Troy (submarine), a small submarine in the shape of a Great White Shark
- Troy class boats, boats unique to Fowey in Cornwall and raced competitively

== Science ==
- Troy weight, a system of measurements for weight and mass commonly used in describing the "size" of precious metals and gemstones
- TNFRSF19 or TROY, a human gene

== Other uses ==
- Troy (horse), a British Thoroughbred racehorse
- City of Troy (horse), American-bred, Irish-trained Thoroughbred racehorse
- Troy (roller coaster), a wooden roller coaster in the Netherlands
- Chad Fortune or Troy, American professional wrestler
- Troy Trojans, the athletic program of Troy University
- Troy (card scheme), domestic payment card scheme of Turkey

== See also ==
- Helen of Troy (disambiguation)
- East Troy (disambiguation)
- South Troy (disambiguation)
- Troi (disambiguation)
- Troy High School (disambiguation)
- Troy Township (disambiguation)
- Troye (disambiguation)
- The Troys
