= South Troy =

South Troy may refer to:

== Places in the United States ==
- South Troy, Minnesota, an unincorporated community
- South Troy, Missouri, an unincorporated community
- South Troy, New York

== See also ==
- South Fork Troy Creek, a stream in Nye County, Nevada, United States
- Troy, Vermont, United States
- North Troy, Vermont, United States
- East Troy (disambiguation), United States
