= Sheboygan Light, Power and Railway Company Car 26 =

- Sheboygan Light, Power and Railway Company Car #26
- U.S. National Register of Historic Places
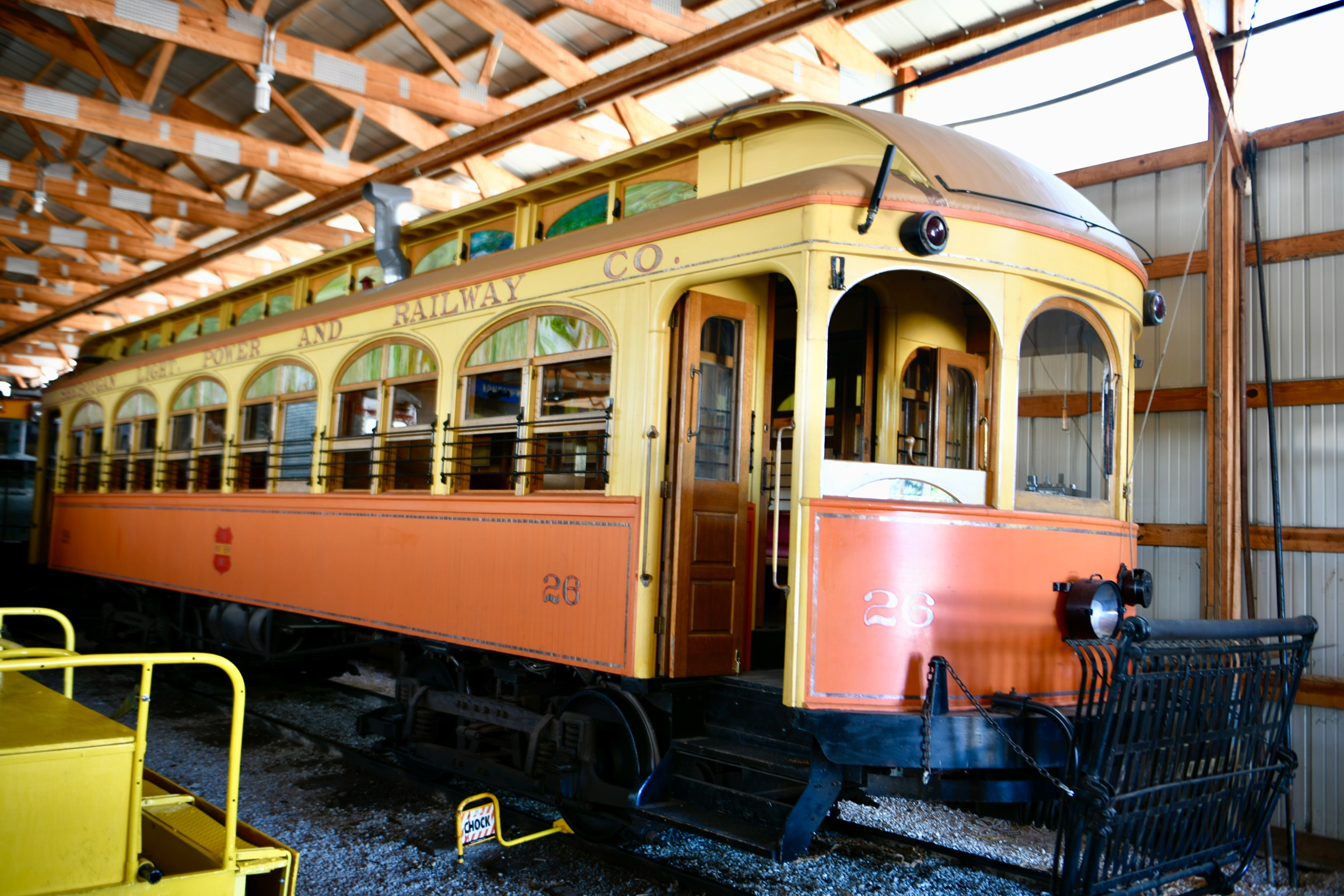
- #26 at East Troy

- Location within Wisconsin Location within the United States
- Location: 2015 Division Street; East Troy, Wisconsin
- Coordinates: 42°47′16″N 88°24′33″W
- Built: 1908
- Built by: Cincinnati Car Company
- Restored: 2005
- Restored by: East Troy Electric Railroad
- NRHP reference No.: 06001069
- Added to NRHP: November 21, 2006

Sheboygan Light, Power and Railway Company Car #26 is a wooden interurban electric rail car built in 1908 that carried passengers on the line between Sheboygan and Elkhart Lake, Wisconsin for 30 years, until the spread of automobiles made passenger rail service non-viable. Today, the car is operated by the East Troy Railroad Museum on their East Troy Electric Railroad, carrying visitors on their track in East Troy.

== Description ==
Car #26 is a wooden passenger car riding on two 27-E Brill trucks, where each "truck" is a unit with four 36-inch wheels, axles, electric motors, springs, and brakes. The motors were driven by trolley poles which conducted current from electric wires that ran above the track. The car's top speed was 45 mph. The body of the car is 44 feet long, eight feet eight inches wide, and about nine feet high. The rounded corners allowed the car to move more safely through crowded city streets. The sides are sheathed in wood paneling. The roof is wood covered with canvas, with a band of arched clerestory openings filled with green opalescent glass on both sides. Each side has six arched windows, with green glass transoms, and an arched door on each end. The glass is manufactured by the Kokomo Opalescent Glass Works. Inside the car, each end has a conductor/motorman vestibule with a set of controllers for the car. When the car reversed direction, the motorman and the conductor swapped ends of the car. Between the vestibules are a small smoking passenger compartment and a non-smoking compartment. The car had all the modern conveniences in 1908, with hot water heating, package holders, and an enclosed lavatory. It has 44 seats.

== History ==
As the city of Sheboygan grew, its need for public transportation grew. In 1885, a streetcar system opened with 11 miles of track and with the cars pulled by horses. In 1889, the Sheboygan Electric Light Company began providing electricity to homes, and in 1893, it took over the money-losing horse-drawn streetcar system, renamed itself the Sheboygan Light, Power & Railway Company, and replaced the horses with electric-powered cars. The cars ran 19 hours on normal days, and to improve revenue, the system carried freight for Kohler Co., local cheese factories, and quarries. Gradually, the system added track until by 1908, the rail line had extended service to Elkhart Lake. In 1908, the Sheboygan rail system also bought three new cars from the Cincinnati Car Company: #25, #26, and #27.

Sheboygan's electric rail system operated into the 1930s, but ridership began dropping in the early 1920s as automobiles and buses grew more common. Aiming to keep its rail system viable, Sheboygan expanded the freight service in 1930, joining with other railroads to haul loads to and from Chicago. This service was called the "bathtub special," because the main user was Kohler Co. for its plumbing supply business. Service within Sheboygan ended in 1935 and the last run to Plymouth was in 1938.

As business waned, car #26 was sold in 1937 to Mr. and Mrs. John B. Huenink for $250. They moved it to some land near Lake Michigan where it served as their summer cottage. It was bought in 1947 by Berend and Jeannette Doedens, who continued to use it as a cottage. By 1988, it was deteriorating. Paul Doedens donated it to the Friends of the East Troy Electric Railroad Museum. They restored it to near original condition, replacing missing machinery like the trucks. The car was added to the National Register of Historic Places in 2006. Today the car is operated intermittently by the museum, carrying visitors on its 7.5 mile remnant of The Milwaukee Electric Railway and Light Company's interurban line.
