= North Troy–Highwater Border Crossing =

Canada–United States border crossing

North Troy-Highwater Border Crossing
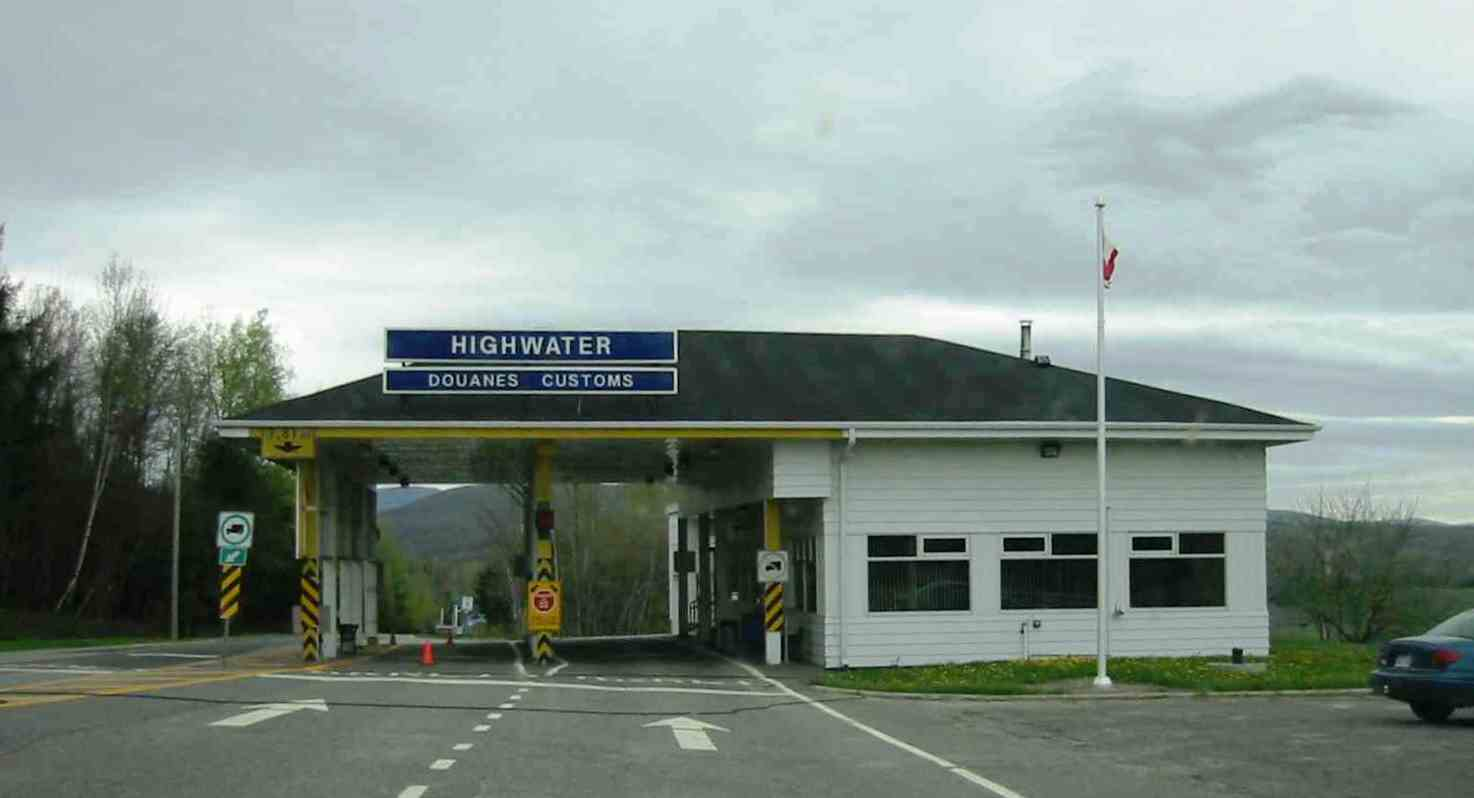
- Canada Border Inspection Station at Highwater, Quebec

Location
- Country: United States; Canada
- Location: VT 243 / R-243; US Port: 807 Vermont Route 243, North Troy, Vermont 05859; Canadian Port: 4 Mansonville Road, Highwater, Quebec J0E 1X0
- Coordinates: 45.007292°N 72.415996°W

Details
- Opened: 1844

Website
- Official Canadian web site; Official United States web site
- U.S. Inspection Station-North Troy, Vermont
- U.S. National Register of Historic Places
- MPS: U.S. Border Inspection Stations MPS
- NRHP reference No.: 14000610
- Added to NRHP: September 10, 2014

The North Troy–Highwater Border Crossing connects the town of Highwater, Quebec with North Troy, Vermont on the Canada–US border. It is located at the meeting point of Vermont Route 243 and Quebec Route 243. Both stations are open 24 hours per day for non-commercial traffic; Starting January 6, 2025 - both stations will only be open 8am - 8pm daily. the Canadian station is open to commercial traffic on weekdays during business hours. The former US station facilities, dating to the 1930s, are listed on the National Register of Historic Places.

== Setting ==
This border crossing, one mile east of the Portland-Montreal Pipe Line, is in a rural setting on the east–west border between Vermont and Quebec, roughly midway between the village center of North Troy, and the crossroads village of Highwater. Route 243 runs in a roughly northwest–southeast direction between the two communities, roughly paralleling the course of the Missisquoi River. Both border stations are located a short distance from the actual border.

== Canadian station ==
Canada first established a Customs operations for this crossing in 1844, when it opened an office four miles north in the town of Potton. In 1933, the office was moved to its present location at the border. The US border station was constructed shortly thereafter. Canada rebuilt its station in 1966, but maintained a similar architectural style, using a hipped-roof structure with an attached canopy.

== United States station ==
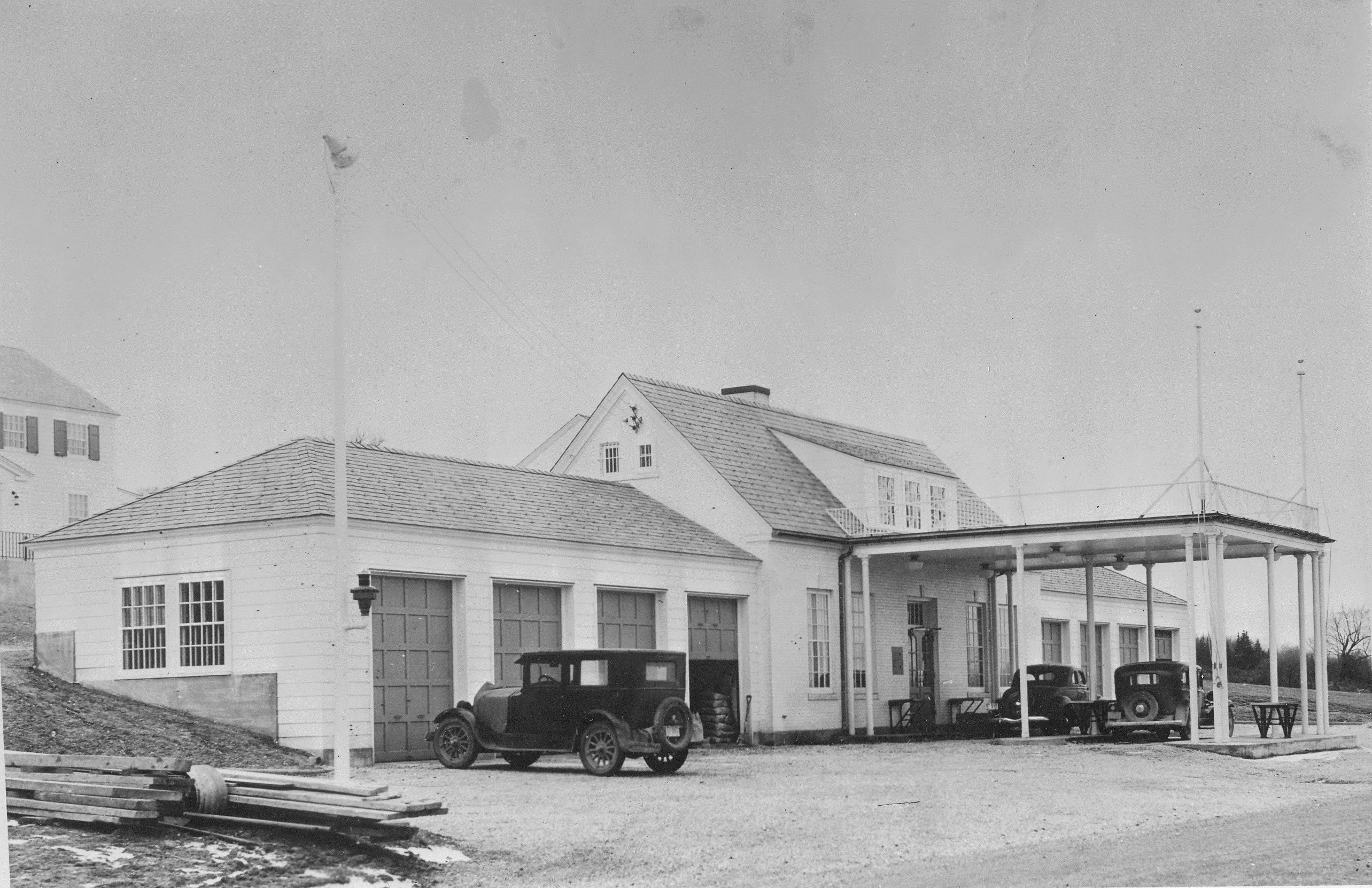
North Troy VT border station, as seen in 1937

The United States station was built in 2009, replacing a facility built in 1937. The 1937 station's main building, which still stands about 150 feet (46 m) south of the current facility, is one of ten surviving 1930s station buildings in Vermont, and was listed on the National Register of Historic Places in 2014 for its architecture and historic significance. It was the first formal border station built on this site, as part of a program by the United States government to improve border security due to increases in the use the automobile for travel, illegal immigration, and smuggling occasioned by Prohibition.

== See also ==
- List of Canada–United States border crossings
- National Register of Historic Places listings in Orleans County, Vermont
