= Vermont Route 243 =

State highway in Orleans County, Vermont, US

Vermont Route 243
- VT 243 highlighted in red

Route information
- Maintained by VTrans
- Length: 1.181 mi (1.901 km)

Major junctions
- West end: R-243 at the Canadian border near North Troy
- East end: VT 105 in North Troy

Location
- Country: United States
- State: Vermont
- Counties: Orleans

Highway system
- State highways in Vermont
| ← VT 242 | → VT 244 |

Vermont Route 243 (VT 243) is a 1.181-mile-long (1.901 km) state highway located within the village of North Troy in Orleans County, Vermont, United States. The route runs from the Canada–United States border at Potton, where the road continues into Quebec, past the North Troy–Highwater Border Crossing as Route 243, to VT 105 in the village center.

== Route description ==
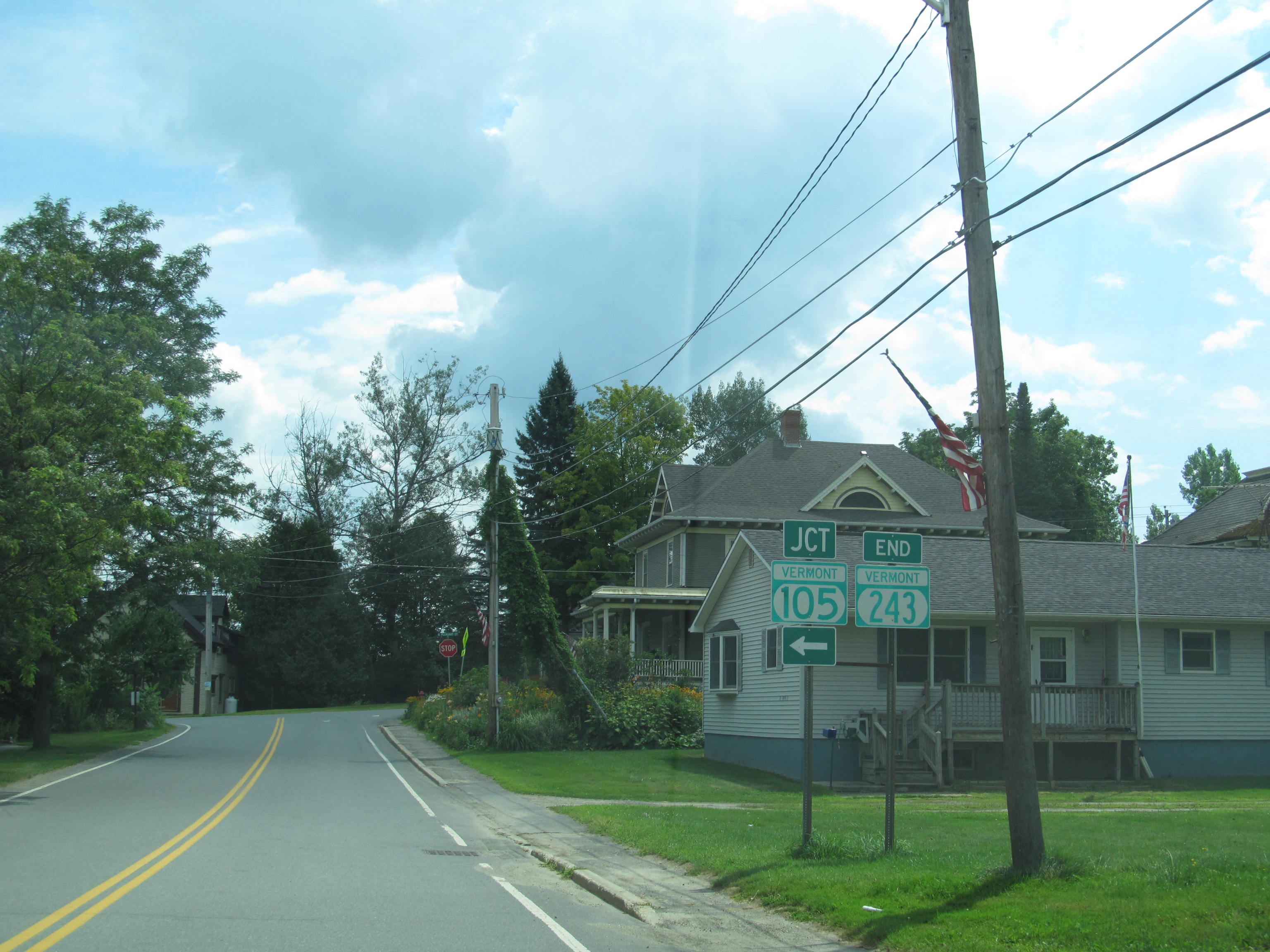
VT 243 westbound approaching VT 105 in North Troy

VT 243 continues off Route 243 (Route de Mansonville) at the US-Canadian border near the North Troy–Highwater Border Crossing United States Customs station and remains a two lane road its entire length. It proceeds southeast through the dense woods and runs parallel with the eponymous railway, passing by some homes. It intersects with Dominion Avenue, which dead-ends short of the Canada–United States border and becomes Railroad Street as it enters the village of North Troy. It also intersects Elm Street and School Street before making a sharp right turn to the south and becoming South Street as it passes through the neighborhood. The route intersects Main Street before reaching its southern terminus at VT 105 (North Pleasant Street).

== Major intersections ==
The entire route is in North Troy, Orleans County.

| mi | km | Destinations | Notes |
|---|---|---|---|
| 0.000 | 0.000 | R-243 north (Route de Mansonville) | North Troy–Highwater Border Crossing; continuation into Quebec |
| 1.181 | 1.901 | VT 105 (North Pleasant Street) to VT 101 – Jay, Richford | Eastern terminus |
1.000 mi = 1.609 km; 1.000 km = 0.621 mi
