= Troy High School =

Troy High School may refer to:

- Troy High School (Alabama), in Troy, Alabama, building listed on the National Register of Historic Places
- Troy High School (California) in Fullerton, California
- Troy Junior/Senior High School in Troy, Idaho
- Troy High School (Kansas) in Troy, Kansas
- Troy High School (Michigan) in Troy, Michigan
- Troy Buchanan High School in Troy, Missouri
- Troy High School (Montana) in Troy, Montana
- Troy High School (New York) in Troy, New York
- Troy High School (Ohio) in Troy, Ohio
- Troy Christian High School in Troy, Ohio
- Troy Public High School in Troy, Pennsylvania, building listed on the National Register of Historic Places
- Troy High School (Texas) in Troy, Texas
- East Troy High School in East Troy, Wisconsin
