= Waukesha Beach Railway =

Coordinates: 43.0578507°N 88.3094258°W

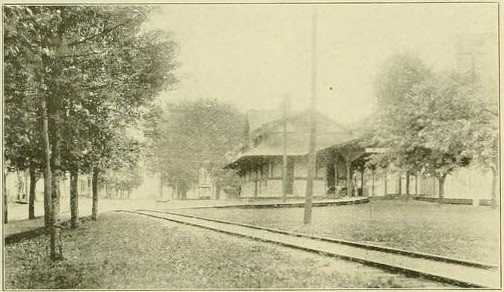
- Waukesha terminus

Overview
- Status: Defunct
- Locale: Wisconsin
- Termini: Waukesha, Wisconsin; Pewaukee Lake

Service
- Type: Interurban

History
- Opened: June 25, 1895
- Closed: July 2, 1951

Technical
- Line length: 6 mi (9.7 km)
- Track gauge: 4 ft 8 1/2 in (1,435 mm) standard gauge
- Minimum radius: 6 degrees
- Electrification: 600 V DC
- Operating speed: 40 mph (64 km/h)
- Maximum incline: 3.2%

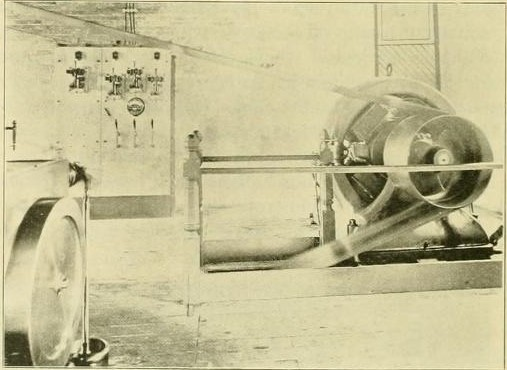
Walker generator and switch board of the Waukesha Beach Railway

The Waukesha Beach Railway operated from 1895 until 1949 as an interurban railway from Waukesha to Pewaukee Lake in Wisconsin.

== History and infrastructure ==
The Waukesha Beach Railway was formed on August 27, 1894, with $75,000 in capital. The railway was built by C. E. Loss & Company of Chicago. The first summer resort season on the railway opened on June 15, 1895, while the railway was formally opened on June 25, 1895.

Waukesha is situated 20 miles (32 km) west of Milwaukee and has become of national reputation on account of its mineral springs at the end of the 19th century, and developed to one of the best-known resorts of wealthy people from Chicago and Milwaukee. Aside from its spring water and the beauties of the town, Waukesha has had, originally, no attractions to make it popular as a resort.

The new rail road, which was 6 miles (9.7 km) long, brought it within easy reach of Pewaukee Lake, a beautiful sheet of water about six miles long and a mile and a half wide. The railway was intended simply for summer pleasure travel to the lake and was planned to be shut down in winter. The railway line connected the terminus at the North-western Railroad depot in Waukesha with the beach of the lake. The railway company carried out extensive improvements at the beach, which it owned, and it became a beautiful spot. The improvements included the Palm Gardens ballroom, a hotel, 3 roller coasters, a fun house and many other amusement rides. Well known entertainers such as Ted Mack, The Andrews Sisters and Heine & His Grenadiers were featured at the park. In 1897, a baseball diamond was added, where a Milwaukee team, managed by the legendary Connie Mack, played an exhibition game.

The railway bought and fenced-off its entire right of way. The construction was much the same as that of a good, solid, steam road, except that the grades were heavier and some of the curves sharper than would be called good practice unless in a mountainous country. The rails were standard 60-pound T rolled by the Illinois Steel Company. An abundance of gravel ballast was obtained along the route, and the contractors have put in a very solid roadbed over which trains ran as smoothly as if on the best steam trunk lines. The time usually taken between one terminus and another was about 15 minutes. The schedule, including switching at terminals, was a round trip every 40 minutes. A trip has been made in 12 minutes. Usually there were no stops between terminals.

The profile of the road was furnished out by William Powrie, the engineer. From Waukesha a climb was made of 140 feet in the first three miles and a descent of about 90 feet in the last three. The heaviest grade was 3.2 per cent. The deepest cut and the greatest fill were 7 feet (2.1 m) each. Outside of the city limits of Waukesha there were no curves of more than 6 degrees, and when not too heavily loaded or when running down grade the cars made 40 miles an hour around them. At the crossing of the Fox River in Waukesha a plate girder bridge 50 feet long was erected. At the Chicago, Milwaukee, St. Paul and Pacific Railroad crossing interlocking home and distant semaphore signals were put in so that trains on neither road stop unless compelled to by the signals.

== Rolling stock ==
Two trains were kept in operation. The rolling stock consisted initially of three motor cars and four trailers. All were open except one motor car which was closed. They were all 37 feet (11 m) over all and the open cars had twelve seats. They were Pullman built mounted on Brill maximum traction trucks. The motor equipment consisted of two 50-horse-power Walker motors to each car. The Walker company has been devoting special attention to motors of this class for interurban service, and the results in this case were very satisfactory.

The original two-motor cars were replaced with four-motor 100 type cars in 1903. Year-around service began to West Limits on 11 December 1899.

== Power plant ==
The power plant contained a 250-horse-power Allis Corliss steam engine and a 150-kilowatt Walker generator and switchboard apparatus. The trolley line was divided into three sections, each fed separately.

== Management ==
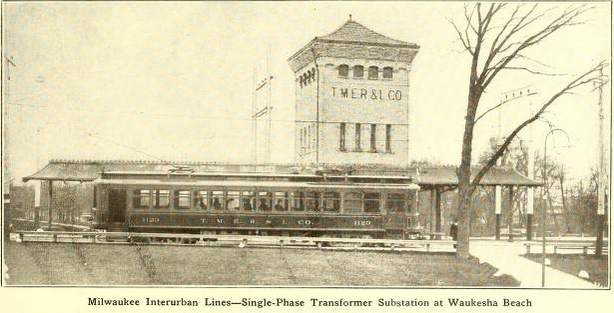
TMER&L car and single phase transformer substation at Waukesha Beach, 1911

Alfred M. Jones, who was well known under the familiar name of "Long Jones," was the first president. The operation of the road was initially under the charge of C. L. Jones, formerly of the Milwaukee Street Railway. The railway was bought by The Milwaukee Electric Railway and Light Company in August 1897 for $62,500.

== Decline and closure ==
By the late 1930s, financial problems and increased auto ownership led to the final abandonment of operations to the park on July 21, 1941. The interurban totally ceased operations on July 2, 1951. After World War II, Waukesha Beach became less of an attraction & the entire park closed in 1949. Today, the original 20 acres used for the amusement park are known as "Beach Park", a subdivision of homes.
