= Helen of Troy (disambiguation) =

Helen of Troy is a figure from Greek mythology:

Helen of Troy may also refer to:

== People ==
- Helen Wellington-Lloyd (born 1954), performer associated with the punk band Sex Pistols and director Derek Jarman, who used the name "Helen of Troy"

== Arts, entertainment, and media ==
- Helen of Troy, New York, a 1923 musical review with songs by Harry Ruby
- Helen of Troy (album), a 1975 album by John Cale
- Helen of Troy (film), a 1956 motion picture
- Helen of Troy (painting), an 1898 painting by Evelyn De Morgan
- Helen of Troy (TV miniseries), a 2003 television miniseries
- "Helen of Troy", a 2013 song on Orchestral Manoeuvres in the Dark's album English Electric
- "Helen of Troy", a 2021 song on Lorde's album Solar Power

== Other uses ==
- Helen of Troy Limited, a manufacturer of personal care products

== See also ==
- Helen (disambiguation)
- Troy (disambiguation)
