= East Troy (disambiguation) =

East Troy may refer to:

== Places ==
United States

- East Troy, Maine, a village
- East Troy, Pennsylvania, an unincorporated community
- East Troy, Wisconsin, a village
- East Troy (town), Wisconsin, a town

== High schools ==
United States

- East Troy High School, East Troy, Wisconsin

== Railroads ==
United States

- East Troy Electric Railroad, a heritage railroad operating passenger excursions on a 7-mile stretch of track from East Troy, Wisconsin to Mukwonago, Wisconsin
