= Troy Independent School District =

School district in Texas

Coordinates: 31°12′38″N 97°18′21″W

Troy Independent School District is a public school district based in Troy, Texas (USA).

Located in Bell County, the district extends into a small portion of Falls County. In addition to Troy, the district also serves the unincorporated communities of Pendleton, Belfalls, and Oenaville.

In 2009, the school district was rated "academically acceptable" by the Texas Education Agency.

== Schools ==
- Troy High School (Grades 9-12)
- Raymond Mays Middle School (Grades 6-8)
- Troy Elementary School (Grades 2-5)
- Mays Elementary School (Grades PK-1)
