= Bujor Hoinic =

Romanian composer, conductor and conservatory professor

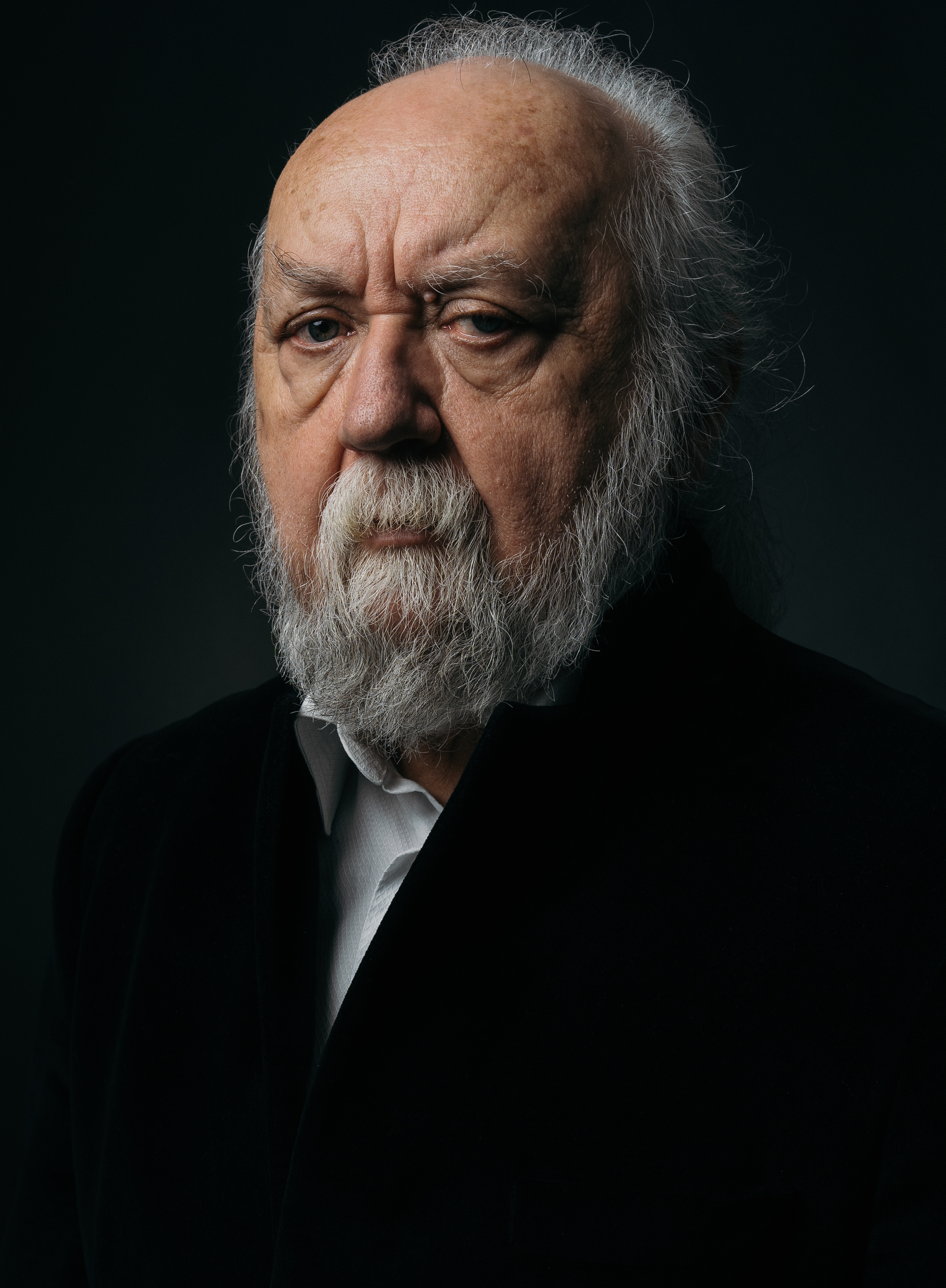
Bujor Hoinic, 2020

Bujor Hoinic (born 17 February 1950) is a Romanian composer, conductor and conservatory professor. He has been chief conductor of the Turkish State Opera and Ballet in Ankara from 1984. He composed the Turkish opera Troy for the theatre.

== Early life ==
Hoinic was born to a musicians family in Timișoara, Romania on 17 February 1950. His father Mircea Hoinic was a conductor and composer. After his father gave him the first music lessons, Hoinic studied at the School of Music in Timișoara. In 1969, he graduated in piano with a degree. He continued his study at the Bucharest National Conservatory and received his graduate degrees with summa cum laude in conducting and composition winning the National Prize.

== Music career ==
Hoinic started his professional career in 1973. He was appointed music director and chief conductor to Timișoara's State Opera serving until 1984. In 1976 he became a member of the Romanian Composers Union. Hoinic was guest conductor at symphonic concerts, operas and ballets in many countries such as at George Enescu Philharmonic Orchestra, Romanian National Opera, Bucharest, Portugal National Symphonic Orchestra in Lisbon, Iași "Moldova" Philharmonic Orchestra, Istanbul State Opera & Ballet, Bursa State Symphony Orchestra, İzmir State Symphony Orchestra in Turkey, Chuvash State Opera and Ballet Theater in Russia, Banatul Philharmonic of Timișoara in Romania and more. He made many recordings for Romanian, Polish, and Turkish radio and televisions. In 1984, he was appointed chief conductor at the Turkish State Opera and Ballet in Ankara. He serves also as the music director of the Başkent Chamber Orchestra and as a visiting professor at Bilkent University in Ankara. Hoinic is also permanent guest conductor of the Bilkent Symphony Orchestra, Antalya State Opera & Ballet, Eskişehir Symphony Orchestra, Mersin State Opera & Ballet and Aspendos International Opera and Ballet Festival.

In 2018, he composed the Turkish-language epic opera Troy in two acts, which premiered on 9 November 2018 in Ankara.

== Personal life ==
In 1984, Hoinic married the Turkish opera singer Ayşe Hoinic. The couple has a son, Artun Hoinic.

== Music ==
- Contemporary Music for Guitar (1997), Bujor Hoinic: Prelude for Solo Guitar, et al. CD CRC 2563 released by Centaur Records.
