= Alfred M. Jones =

American politician (1837–1910)

Alfred M. "Long" Jones
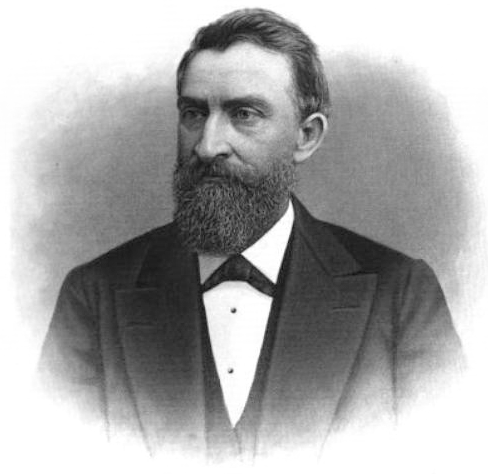

Member of the Wisconsin Senate from the 33rd district
- In office 1899 – 1903

Member of the Illinois House of Representatives from the 10th district
- In office 1872 – 1876

Personal details
- Born: February 5, 1837 New Durham, New Hampshire
- Died: July 8, 1910 (aged 73) Milwaukee, Wisconsin
- Party: Republican
- Profession: Businessman

Alfred Miles Jones (February 5, 1837 – July 8, 1910), nicknamed "Long" Jones, was an American politician and businessman. Born in New Hampshire, Jones came with his family to Illinois in 1847. Jones became a prominent politician in Jo Daviess County, Illinois, eventually rising to deputy sheriff and the leader of the county chapter of the Republican Party. He was elected to two terms in the Illinois House of Representatives, then received two positions under the spoils system. Jones was chairman of the Illinois Republican Committee for twelve years. In the 1880s, he assumed control of the Bethesda spring in Waukesha, Wisconsin, and helped turn it into one of the most prominent spring water companies in the nation. He moved to Waukesha in 1896 and was elected to the Wisconsin State Senate three years later, serving one term.

== Biography ==
Alfred Miles Jones was born in New Durham, New Hampshire, on February 5, 1837. He was the eldest child of farmers Alfred S. and Rebecca (Miles) Jones. When Jones was ten, the family moved to Hebron, Illinois, to establish a new farm. When he was sixteen, Jones moved to Michigan to work in a lumber yard. He later operated a raft on the Mississippi River. After saving some money, he moved to Rockford, Illinois, and attended a school there. Graduating in 1856, Jones returned to the family farm in Hebron, teaching a school there in winters. Shortly afterward, the family moved to Warren. There, Jones opened a store selling books and jewelry. However, he was financially ruined by the Panic of 1857. He left Illinois with a friend to join the Pike's Peak Gold Rush. He found little of value and decided to head east to Kearney, Nebraska. He then returned to Warren to work as a laborer. He was appointed constable of Jo Daviess County, Illinois. Jones became involved in the farm machinery trade and sold such items for five years. He then studied law and became involved with real estate. He rose in county politics to become deputy sheriff and coroner. He was named the chairman of the county Republican Party central committee.

Jones became a member of the State Republican Committee in 1871, serving twelve years as its chairman. In 1872, Jones was elected to the Illinois House of Representatives for the 10th district, serving two two-year terms. He was the Majority Leader for the second term. To distinguish him from fellow representative Benjamin L. Jones, Alfred Jones was nicknamed "Long" Jones (for his height), a nickname that stuck for the rest of his life.

After his second house term expired, Jones was named a commissioner of the Joliet Penitentiary. He was the secretary of the board of trustees for three and a half years. President Rutherford B. Hayes appointed Jones a tax assessor for Sterling, Illinois, in 1880. The next year, President James A. Garfield named him marshal of the Northern District of Illinois. He held the position until 1885. At the 1892 Republican National Convention, he had control of Benjamin Harrison's presidential campaign.

In 1885, Jones assumed control of the Bethesda mineral spring in Waukesha, Wisconsin. He became its president and manager three years later, eventually purchasing almost 75% of the company stock. The company was extremely successful, selling over one million bottles of water a year by 1892. He co-founded the Waukesha Beach Electric Railway and was elected its first president. He also purchased the Terrace Hotel. In 1894, he decided to leave Illinois and permanently settle in Waukesha. He was elected to the Wisconsin State Senate in 1899, serving a four-year term.

Jones married Emeline A. Wright on October 13, 1857. They had two children: Alfred Wirt and Ernie. Alfred Wirt served under his father as secretary of Bethesda. Alfred Miles Jones was a Freemason and Baptist. He died in Milwaukee, Wisconsin, on July 8, 1910, and was buried in Prairie Home Cemetery.
