= Troy (CDP), Vermont =

Census-designated place in Vermont, United States

Troy, Vermont
- Census-designated place
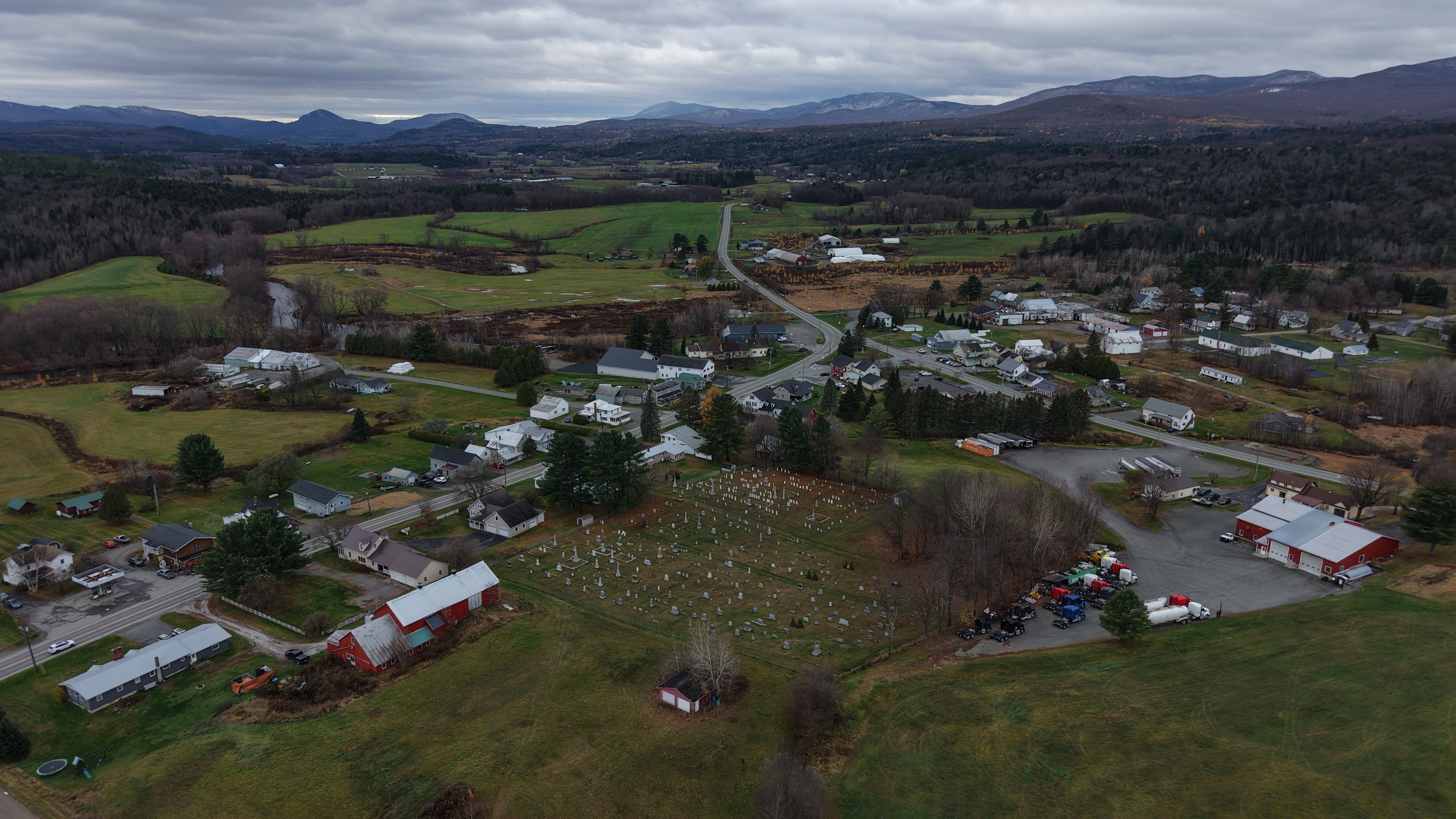
- Troy Village, VT, from the northeast

- Location within Vermont Location within the United States
- Coordinates: 44°54′31″N 72°24′16″W
- Country: United States
- State: Vermont
- County: Orleans
- Town: Troy

Area
  - Total: 0.95 sq mi (2.45 km^{2})
  - Land: 0.92 sq mi (2.39 km^{2})
  - Water: 0.023 sq mi (0.06 km^{2})
- Elevation: 833 ft (254 m)

Population (2020)
  - Total: 261
- Time zone: UTC-5 (Eastern (EST))
  - Summer (DST): UTC-4 (EDT)
- ZIP Code: 05868 (Troy); 05859 (North Troy)
- Area code: 802
- FIPS code: 50-73450
- GNIS feature ID: 2586657

Troy is an unincorporated village and census-designated place (CDP) in the town of Troy, Orleans County, Vermont, United States. As of the 2020 census, it had a population of 261, out of 1,722 in the entire town of Troy.

== Geography ==
The CDP is in northwestern Orleans County, in the west-central part of the town. Its western border is the town line with Westfield. Vermont Routes 100 and 101 meet in the center of the village. Route 100 leads northeast 7 miles (11 km) to its northern terminus at Route 105 in Newport Center, and south 8 miles (13 km) to Lowell, while Route 101 leads north 6 miles (10 km) to North Troy next to the Canadian border.

Troy village is in the valley of the Missisquoi River, which flows northwards along the east side of the village. The river flows north into Quebec, then turns west, passes the north end of the Green Mountains, and reenters Vermont, where it continues to Lake Champlain.
