= Old Troy, Texas =

Coordinates: 31.2332°N 97.2880°W

Old Troy, known as Troy, Texas, for most of its existence and the location of the Elm Creek Post Office, is a ghost town in Bell County, Texas approximately two miles north of the current city of Troy. It was settled in the 1850s with a post office named Elm Creek established in 1854.

The Missouri, Kansas and Texas Railroad built its route south of the town in 1882 and established a station at what is now Troy. Many of Troy's residents resisted the rise of the new Troy and the school at Old Troy still had 60 students in 1903. It totally vanished by the late 1920s.
