= Troy (opera) =

- Opera by Bujor Hoinic
- Librettist: Artun Hoinic
- Language: Turkish
- Based on: The Iliad by Homer
- Premiere: 9 November 2018; ATO Congresium, Ankara, Turkey

Troy (Turkish: Troya) is an opera in two acts by Bujor Hoinic set to a Turkish-language libretto by Artun Hoinic, based on the ancient Greek epic poem Iliad by Homer. It premiered in Ankara, Turkey, in 2018 and was restaged at the Bolshoi Theatre in Moscow, Russia, in 2019.

== Overview ==
Troy was composed by Bujor Hoinic, the Romanian chief conductor of the Turkish State Opera and Ballet. The libretto was written by Artun Hoinic. It is the first Turkish opera written and composed by foreigners.

Based on the 8th-century BC Greek epic poem Iliad by Homer, the opera was completed in May 2018 after three-and-half months' work. The eight scenes of the two-act opera handle the war and life at Troy (modern Hisarlik, northwestern Turkey). To Hoinic, "it blends an ancient civilization with modern music, where ancient modes, secret makams and Anatolian rhythms are used, too".

The premiere took place at the ATO Congresium in Ankara, Turkey, performed by the Ankara State Opera and Ballet on 9 November 2018. The opera was commissioned by the Ministry of Culture and Tourism as part of the "2018 Tourism Year of Troy" in Turkey, declared in connection with the 20th anniversary of Troy's entry into the UNESCO World Heritage Site list.

On 8 April 2019, Troy was staged at the Bolshoi Theatre in Moscow, for the opening of the "2019 Russia–Turkey Cultural Year".

== Roles ==
Roles, voice types, premiere cast
Role	Voice type	Premiere cast, 9 November 2018 Conductor: Bujor Hoinic
Homer, ancient Greek author of the Iliad	actor	Mustafa Kurt
Agamemnon, King of Mycenae	bass	Şafak Güç
Priam, King of Troy	baritone	Zafer Erdaş
Helen, Queen of Sparta	soprano	Seda Ayazlı
Paris, Prince of Troy	tenor	Murat Karahan
Hector, Trojan prince and the greatest fighter for Troy	ballerino	Tan Sağtürk
Menelaus, King of Mycenaean (pre-Dorian) Sparta	actor	Mert Türkoğlu
Chorus and dancers

== Synopsis ==
=== Act 1 ===
Scene 1: The palace of King Menelaus in Sparta

Menelaus, the king of Sparta, invites all the Greek kings and princes of Troy, Paris and Hector, to the wedding of Thetis and Peleus in Sparta. During the celebrations following the wedding, Paris is attracted to Queen Helen the Beautiful, the wife of Menelaus. She responds to Paris' feelings.

Scene 2: The temple of goddess Artemis in Aulis

Menelaus understands that Paris has kidnapped Helen. He asks his brother Agamemnon, the king of Mycenae, for help. Agamemnon gathers all the Greek kings and heroes in the temple. He accuses Troy of treason, and demands the Trojan to account. He orders the Greek heroes Achilles, Odysseus and Ajax to be ready for a war with Troy. His aim is to attack Troy as soon as possible, invade this country and avenge his brother. He consults Priest Chalcas for future telling. The priest advises him to make a sacrifice to the goddess Artemis for a victory. Agamemnon's daughter, the young princess Ephigenia is brought to the altar accompanied by rituals.

Scene 3: Trojan palace. The sun shines on Troy

Paris and Hector return to Troy with Helen, and they meet King Priam. The Trojans are in panic, and Helen is worried of a war due to her kidnapping. Witnessing the love between Paris and Helen, Priam declares that Helen is now a Trojan princess. He asserts to the nobles and the people that the walls of Troy can never be crossed in case of a war.

Scene 4: Outside the walls of Troy. Dark clouds are on Troy

Agamemnon and his heroes appear with the army of Sparta before the walls of Troy. Priam, the Trojan princes and the nobles, in front of the Trojan army, move out of the walls. As both kings, Agamemnon and Priam, can not reach a peaceful solution, the Greek army starts an attack while the Trojan army, led by Hector, goes into defense after Priam is secured. When the war begins, the two heroes, Hector and Achilles, come face to face in a duel, which ends with Achilles killing Hector. The Greek army attacks Troy, however, cannot cross the strong Trojan walls.

=== Act 2 ===
Scene 5: The square inside the castle of Troy

Hector's body is brought to a square inside the castle for cremation in front of the gathered Trojan folk. His father Priam puts two gold coins on Hector's eyes to let him easily travel to the "land of the dead" before the corpse is set to burn. Helen is sad and tries to escape to prevent a war. Paris persuades her to stay saying that Agamemnon's real intention is to invade Troy, even if Helen would go back.

Scene 6: Greek army camp outside of Troy walls

After preparations, the Greek army attacks Troy. A blood bath takes place, but the Trojan army creates an indispensable defense. The Greeks experience a great defeat. Also Greek hero Ajax and some soldiers are captured by Troy. Priam and his soldiers chase the Greek army fleeing to their ships.

Scene 7: The great square in front of King Priam's palace in Troy

Priam appears with Paris and Helen before the gathered people and announces their great victory. Ajax and other Greek prisoners of war are brought to the square. The people want to lynch the prisoners. However, Priam forgives them and sets them free. Paris learns that the Greek army left a gigantic wooden horse structure outside the city. It is taken inside the walls as a sign of victory although the nobles recommend its burning. The celebrations around the horse structure continue until the late hours of the night.

Scene 8: Midnight at the big square of Troy

After the Trojan soldiers and the people fall asleep following the day-long celebrations, Achilles, Odysseus and the myrmidons come out of the horse. They open the city gates for the hidden Greek army after the guards are made ineffective. The city suddenly turns into a battlefield and Trojans are slaughtered one by one, and Troy burns in flames. Paris spots Achilles and shoots an arrow for the revenge of Hector. The arrow hits Achilles' tendon in his leg leaving him vulnerable. A second arrow hits Achilles in the chest. He removes it but dies. During the massacre, Agamemnon kills Priam brutally while Paris, Helen and a few remaining nobles flee from Troy for their lives.
