= Tom Velk =

Canadian economist

Tom Velk (Thomas James Velk) is a libertarian-leaning American economist who teaches and lives in Montreal, Quebec, Canada. He is the chair of the North American studies program at McGill University and a professor in that university's economics department. His research interests are in monetary economics and public policy, specifically the de-regulation of money markets and the usefulness—or lack thereof—of central banks.

Velk holds a Ph.D. in economics from the University of Wisconsin. He has edited a number of books on Canadian and American public policy issues. Additionally, he has served on the Board of Governors of the American Federal Reserve System as a visiting professor and consultant (1969–1972), and worked for the World Bank. In 1982–1983 Velk was a visiting scholar at the department of economics at Dartmouth College and in 1974 served as a consultant to the Joint Economic Committee of the United States Congress.

Velk is a regular contributor to media coverage of economic issues, writing a recurring column, "From the Right", for CBC News Viewpoint in 2005–2006. Velk has also written for The Wall Street Journal, the Canadian Forum, The Globe and Mail, Financial Post, Montreal Gazette, Le Devoir, and the CBC.

He currently resides in North Troy, Vermont.
