= East Troy, Pennsylvania =

Unincorporated community in Pennsylvania, US

- Unincorporated community
- Location within Pennsylvania
- Coordinates: 41°46′12″N 76°44′14″W
- Country: United States
- State: Pennsylvania
- County: Bradford
- Elevation: 974 ft (297 m)
- Time zone: UTC-5 (Eastern (EST))
  - Summer (DST): UTC-4 (EDT)
- Area code: 570
- GNIS feature ID: 1173887

East Troy is an unincorporated community in Bradford County, Pennsylvania, United States.
