= Troi =

Troi may refer to:

- Deanna Troi, fictional character in the Star Trek universe
- Lwaxana Troi, fictional character in the television series Star Trek: The Next Generation and Star Trek: Deep Space Nine
- Ménage à Troi (TNG episode), episode from the third season of Star Trek: The Next Generation
- Radu Troi (born 1949), Romanian footballer
- Troi Zee (born 2002), American actress and singer
