= East Troy Electric Railroad =

Railway line in the United States of America

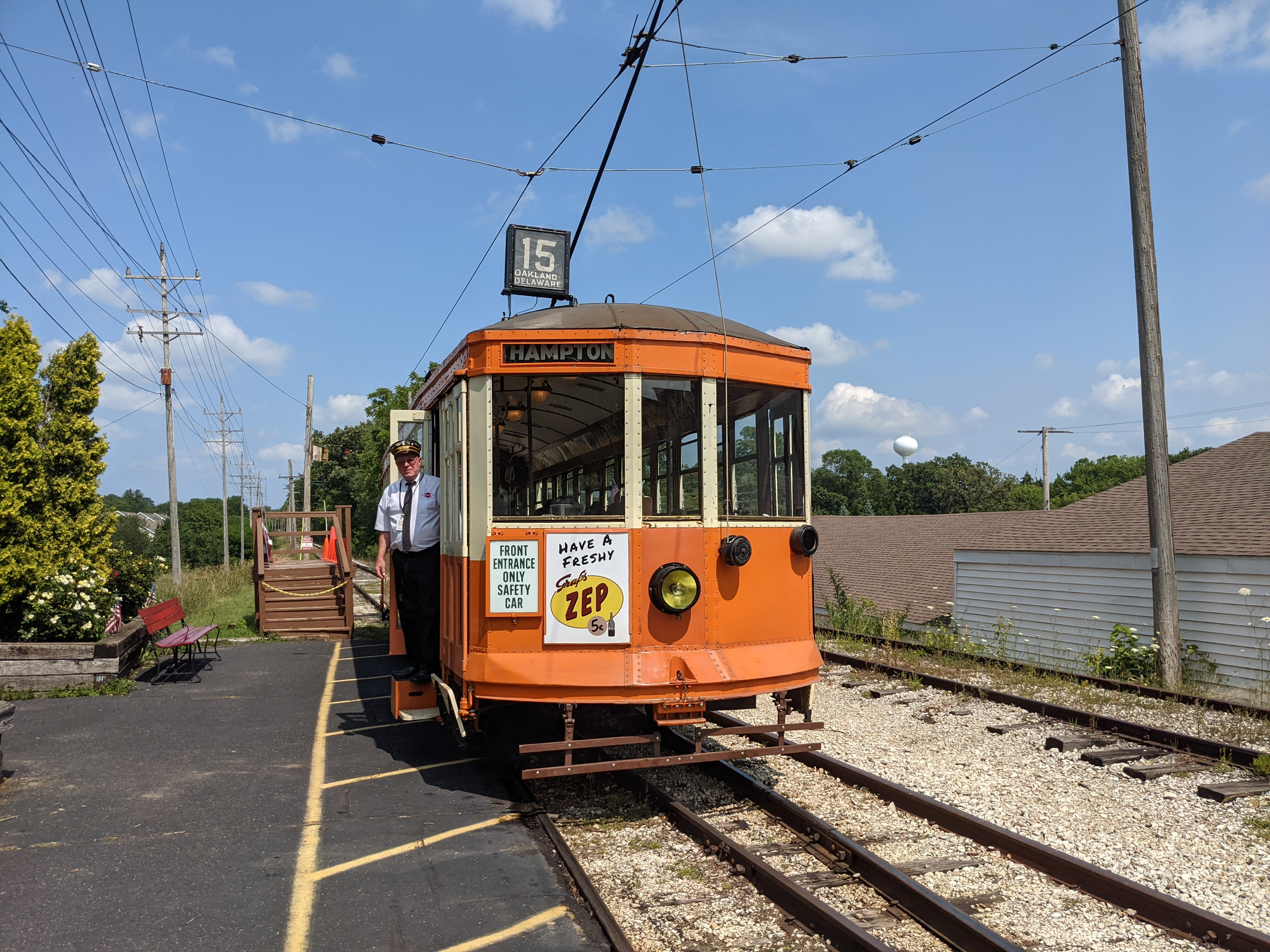
- Ex-Milwaukee streetcar 846 in 2021
- Locale: East Troy, Walworth County, Wisconsin
- Connections: Canadian National Railway

Commercial operations
- Built by: The Milwaukee Electric Railway and Light Company
- Original gauge: 4 ft 8 1/2 in (1,435 mm) standard gauge

Preserved operations
- Reporting mark: ETER – Formerly METW
- Stations: 3
- Length: 7 miles (11 km)
- Preserved gauge: 4 ft 8 1/2 in (1,435 mm) standard gauge
- Preserved electrification: 600 V DC

Preservation history
- Headquarters: East Troy, Wisconsin

Website
- easttroyrr.org

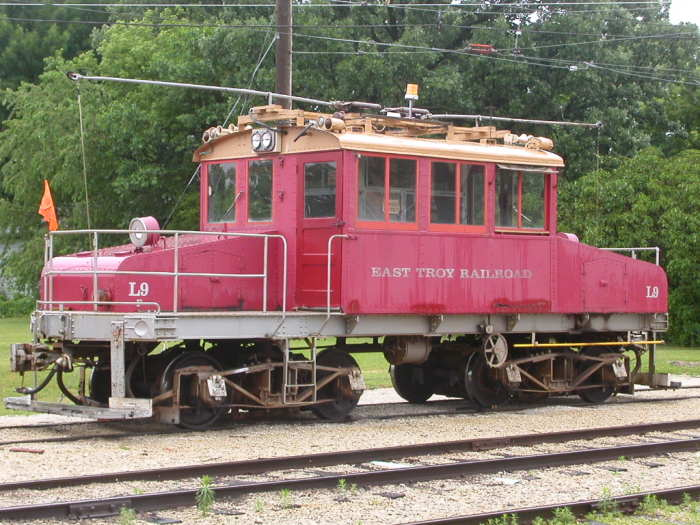
A steeplecab electric locomotive shown outside of the storage barn in East Troy

The East Troy Electric Railroad (reporting mark ETER) is an interurban heritage railroad owned and operated by the East Troy Railroad Museum. Passenger excursions run on a 7-mile (11 km) stretch of track from East Troy to Mukwonago, Wisconsin.

== History ==
The line dates back to 1907, when it was a part of The Milwaukee Electric Railway and Light Company line from East Troy to Milwaukee.

The East Troy-Mukwonago segment was purchased by the Village of East Troy in 1939, when the remainder of the line to Hales Corners was abandoned. Under terms of the purchase, it was operated by TMER&L crews for ten years. In 1949, TMER&L declined to renew the agreement for another ten years and the village hired its own crew and operated the railroad from 1950 until 1985. This is when the railroad became the Municipality of East Troy Wisconsin Railroad and adopted the reporting symbol METW. In 1985 the village approached the Wisconsin Trolley Museum and asked them to take over the operation of the railroad. They agreed to do so, and moved their collection of trolleys to East Troy.

Museum operations began over the line as early as 1967 when The Wisconsin Electric Railway Historical Society (TWERHS) relocated its collection of electric railway equipment from North Freedom, Wisconsin, to East Troy. TWERHS operated over the line using a trackage rights agreement with the village until 1984, when the trackage rights agreement ended and the Wisconsin Trolley Museum began to operate the line as the East Troy Electric Railroad. The Friends of East Troy Railroad Museum, Inc. purchased the rail line from the village and also purchased the trolley collection of Paul Averdung between 1995 and 2000 in stages.

== Current operation ==
The East Troy Railroad Museum operates a museum and just over 7 miles (11 km) of track offering rides on a weekly basis during the spring through fall season. The original substation building in East Troy, Wisconsin, is used as a ticket office and museum, and visitors can purchase rides to the Elegant Farmer store at Phantom Woods, and to Indianhead Park in Mukwonago. A collection of approximately 30 pieces of electric railway equipment is kept in storage barns in downtown East Troy and at Phantom Woods. The museum is a 501(c)(3) non-profit educational corporation run by volunteers. The substation, located at 2002 Church Street in East Troy, is on the National Register of Historic Places.

== Route description ==
The railway itself is a standard gauge common carrier railroad that operates in interchange with Canadian National Railway (formerly a connection to Wisconsin Central Ltd.). This gives the East Troy electric railroad the ability to pick up and deliver freight (including fertilizer for the Farmers Co-op, sand for the local Ready-Mix, and lumber and steel tubing) to the village of East Troy. However, the railroad has not been used to carry freight for at least ten years.

Much of the track is original and the railbed was refurbished during the mid-1990s. The line is completely electric, utilizing a 600 V direct current system. Power is supplied to trolleys and interurban railroad cars through overhead wires. The original 500 kW rotary converter motor-generator is no longer used and is on display at the museum.

== Notable equipment ==
Original owner	Number	Built	Notes
Sheboygan Light, Power and Railway Company	26	1908	Fully restored wooden interurban car
The Milwaukee Electric Railway and Light Company	846	1920	Milwaukee streetcar
Chicago North Shore and Milwaukee	761	1930	Fully restored interurban car
The Milwaukee Electric Railway and Light Company	D-23	1907	Line Car used to maintain overhead wire, supports
Chicago South Shore and South Bend	24, 25	1927	Former interurban coaches converted by the museum to dining cars "Ravenswood" and "Beverly Shores"
The Milwaukee Electric Railway and Light Company	L-6	1911	Utility Crane Car
The Milwaukee Electric Railway and Light Company	L-8	1935	Electric locomotive used for hauling freight
The Milwaukee Electric Railway and Traction Company	L-9	1944	Electric locomotive used for hauling freight
Chicago South Shore and South Bend	6, 9, 13, 23, 30, 33, 107	1926 1929	Steel interurban coaches
Twin City Rapid Transit Company	1583	1913	Double-truck street car from Minneapolis-St. Paul

== Gallery ==
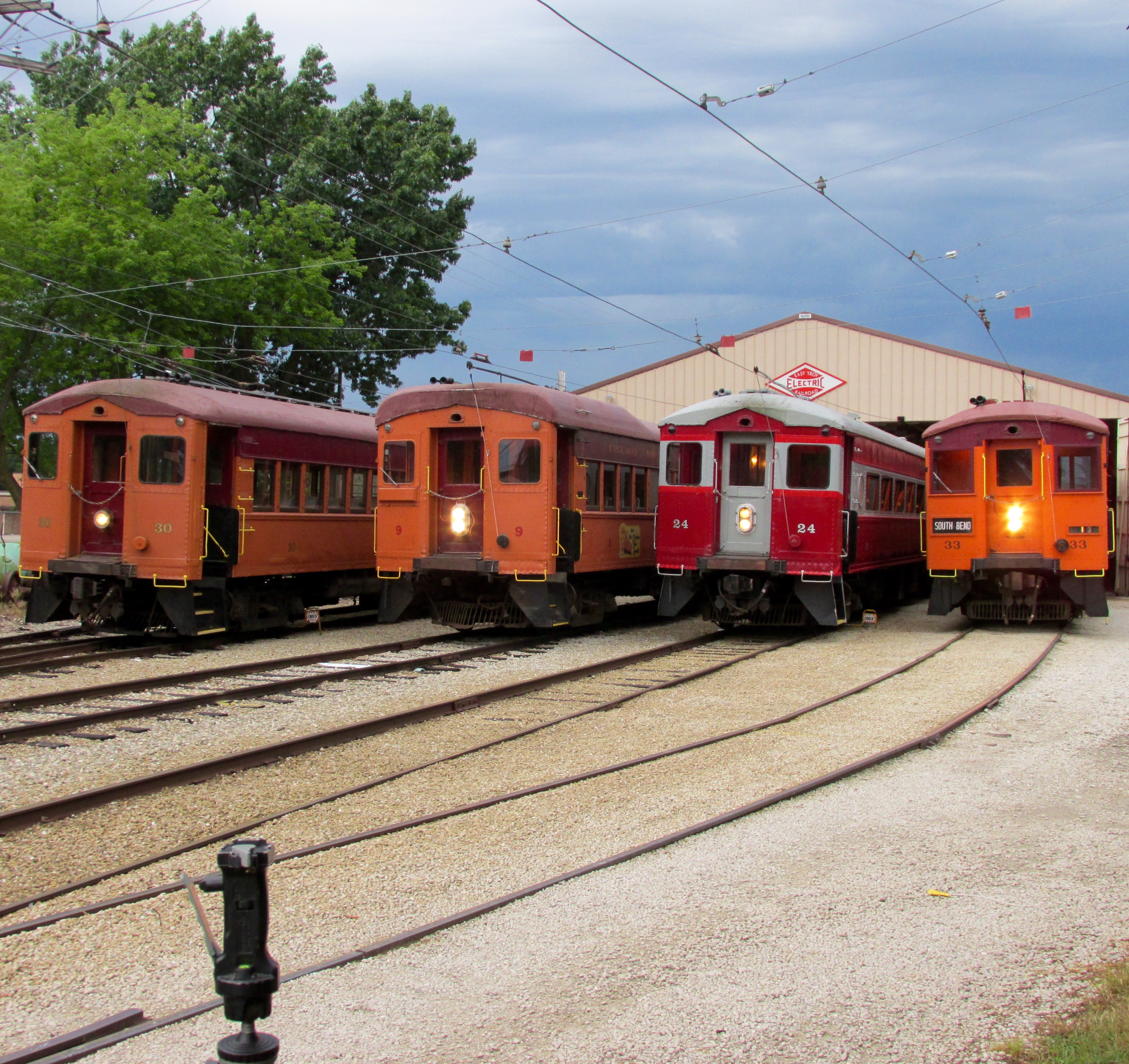
The East Troy Railroad Museum lines up former Chicago, South Shore and South Bend cars for a photo shoot.

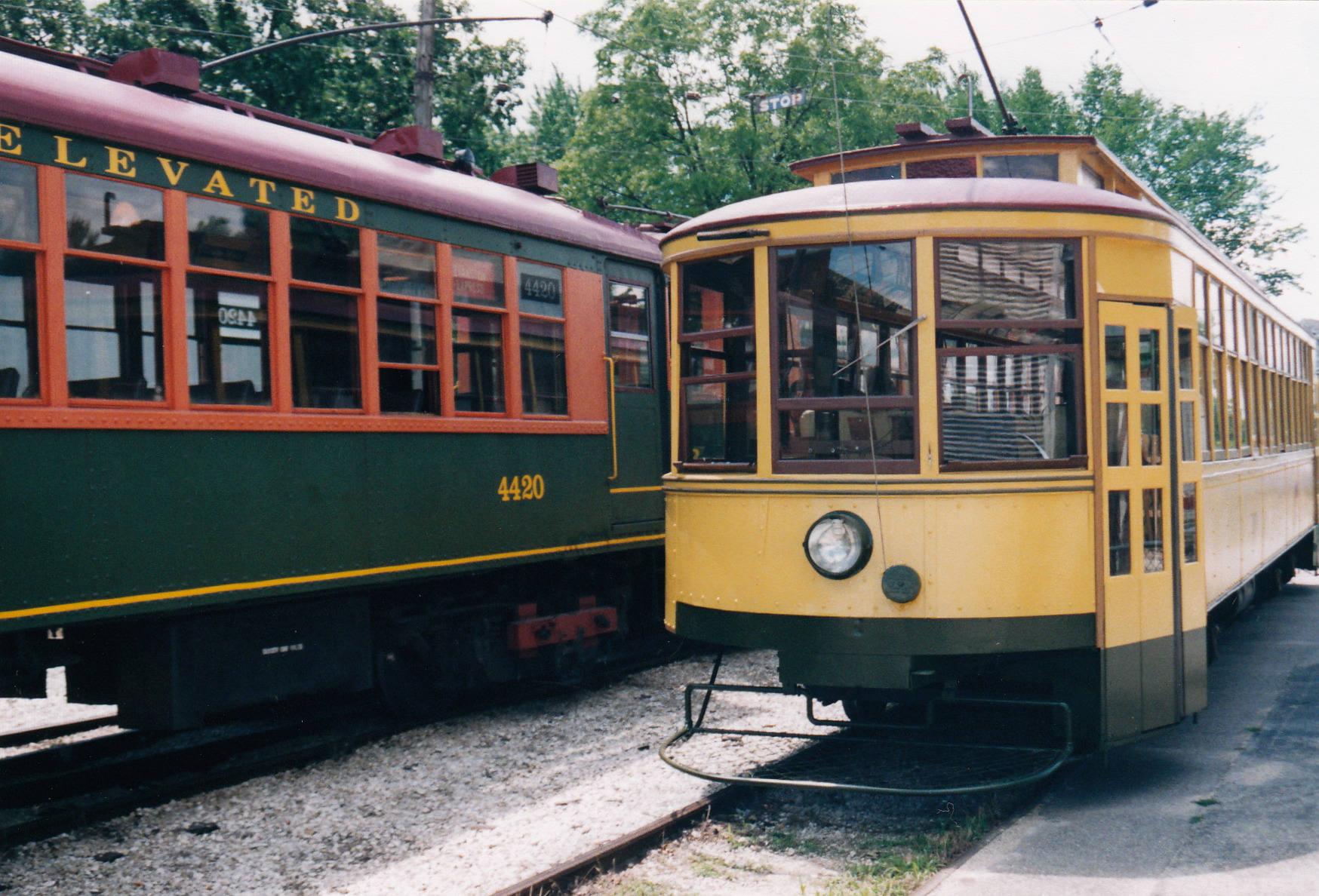
A 1924 elevated car from the Chicago Transit Authority (left) and a 1913 Twin City Rapid Transit Company streetcar (right)

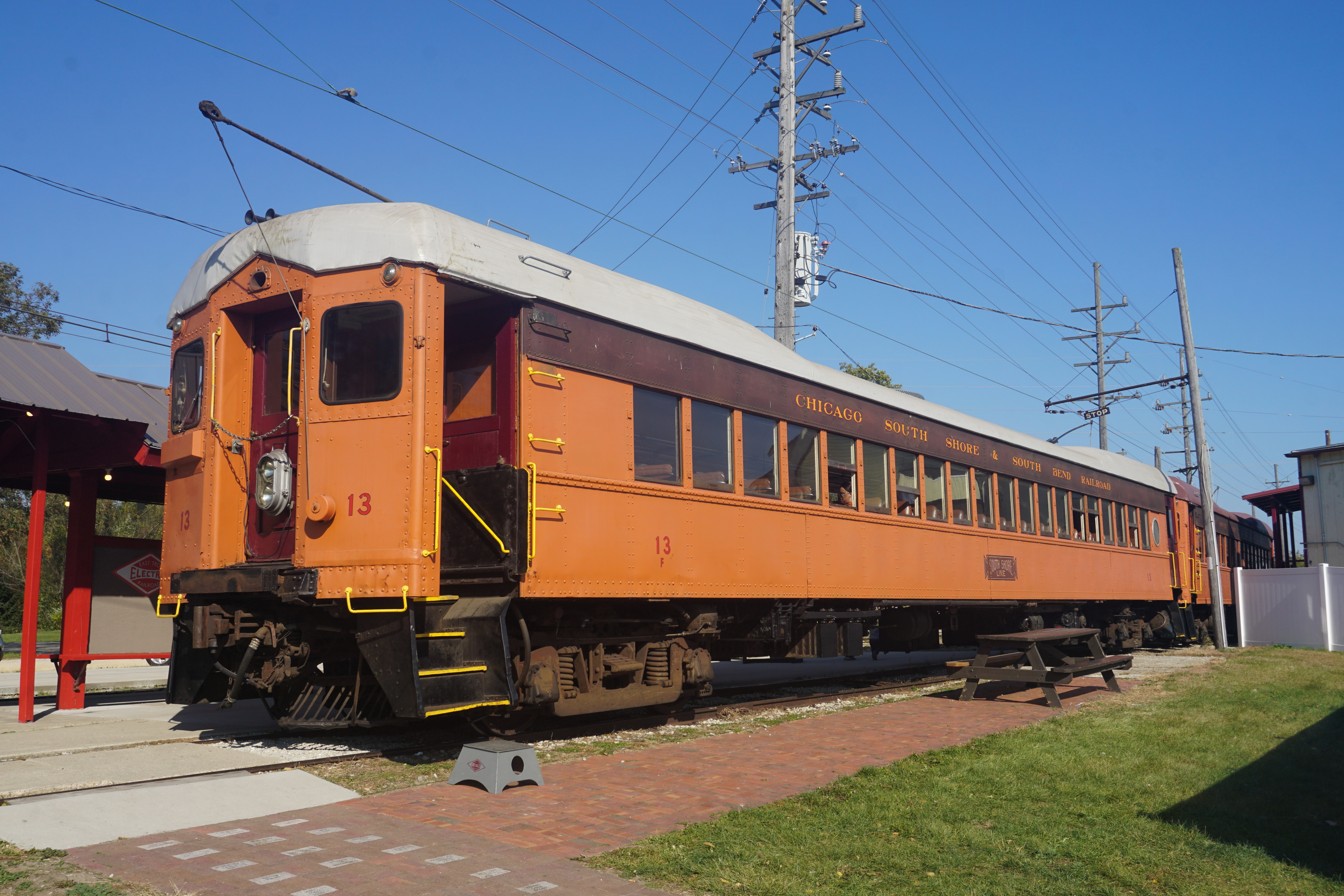
Chicago South Shore and South Bend No. 13 at The Elegant Farmer in Mukwonago

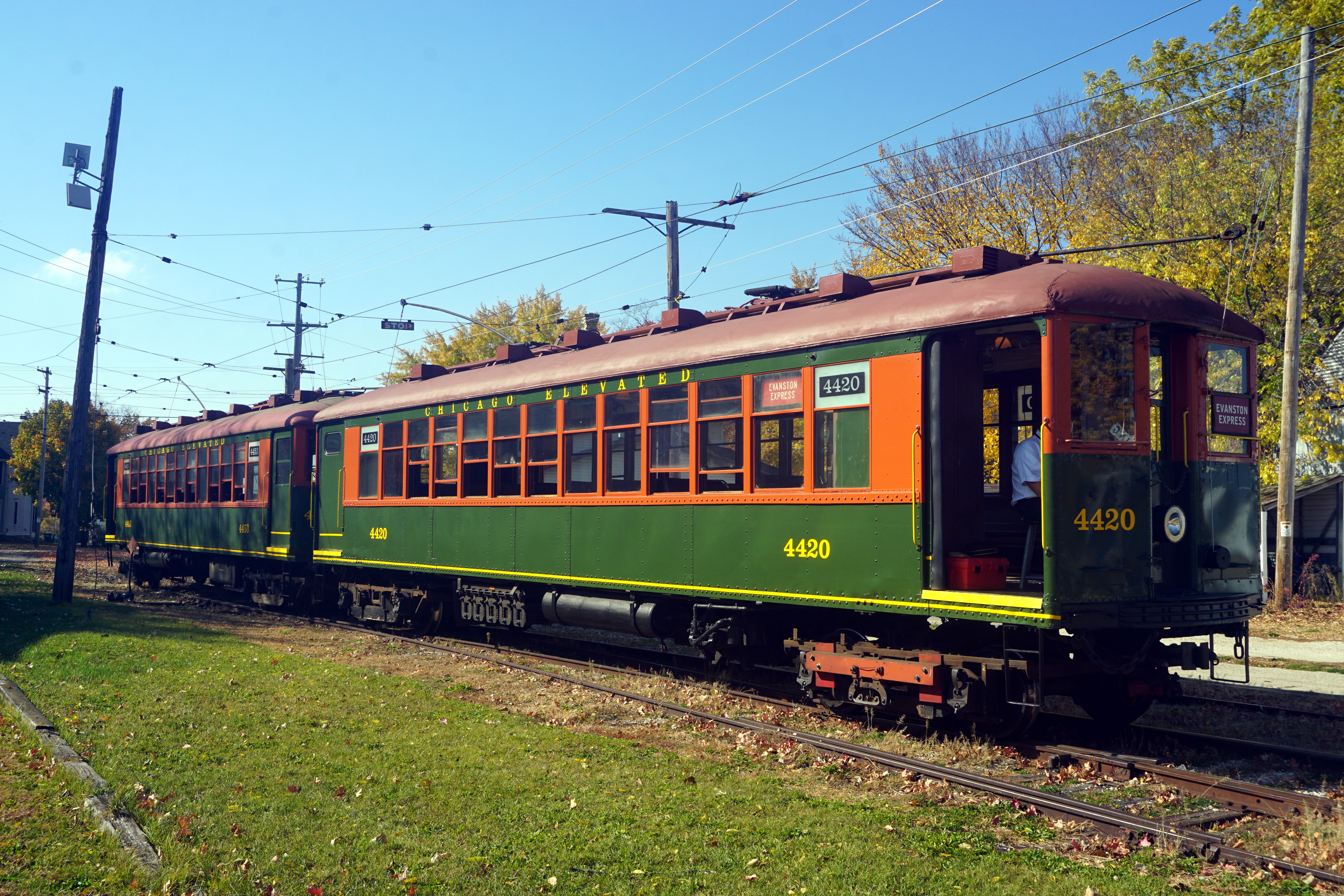
Chicago "L" No. 4420 and 4453 at East Troy

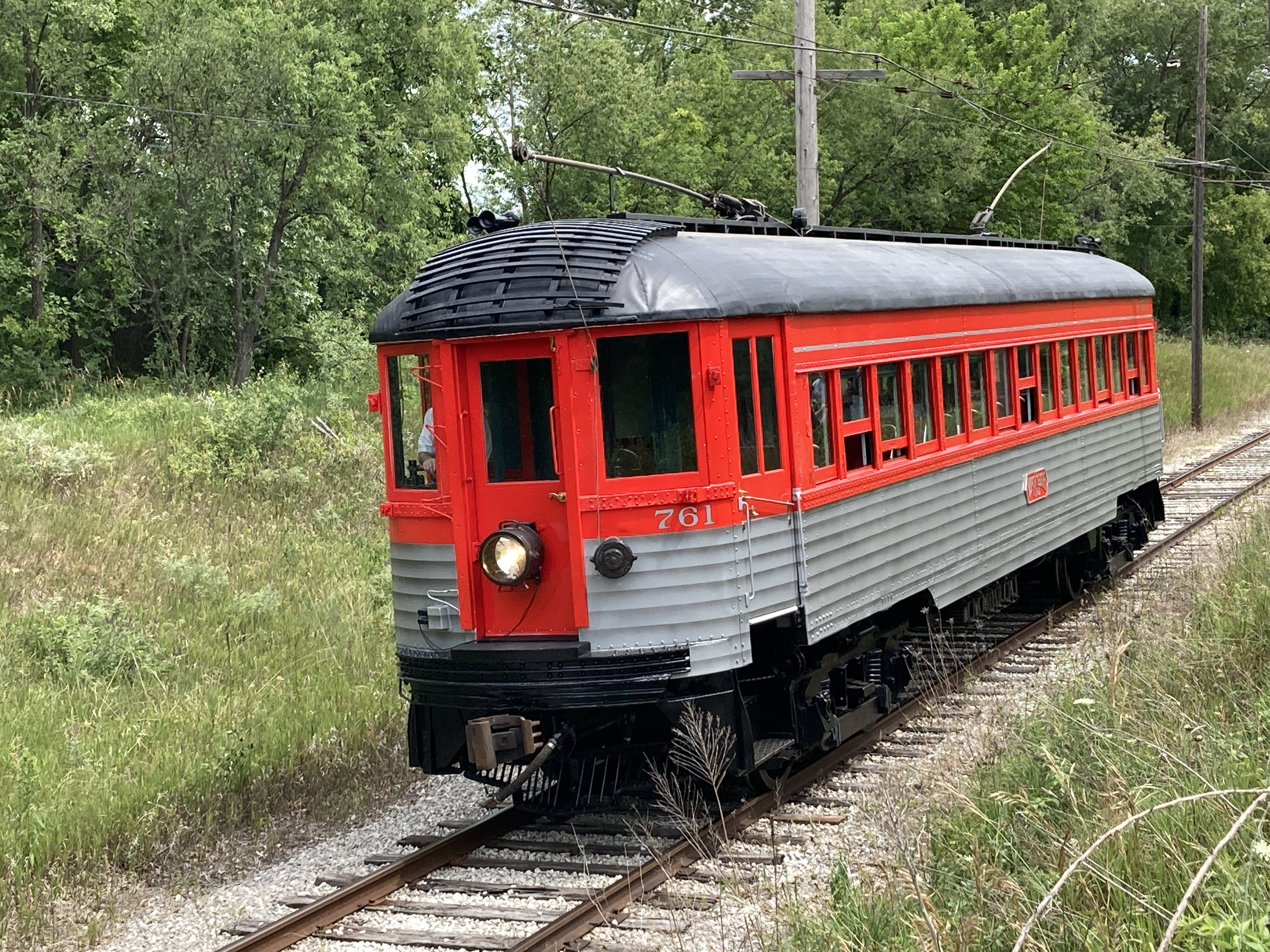
North Shore Car 761 on its first revenue run in East Troy in July 2021

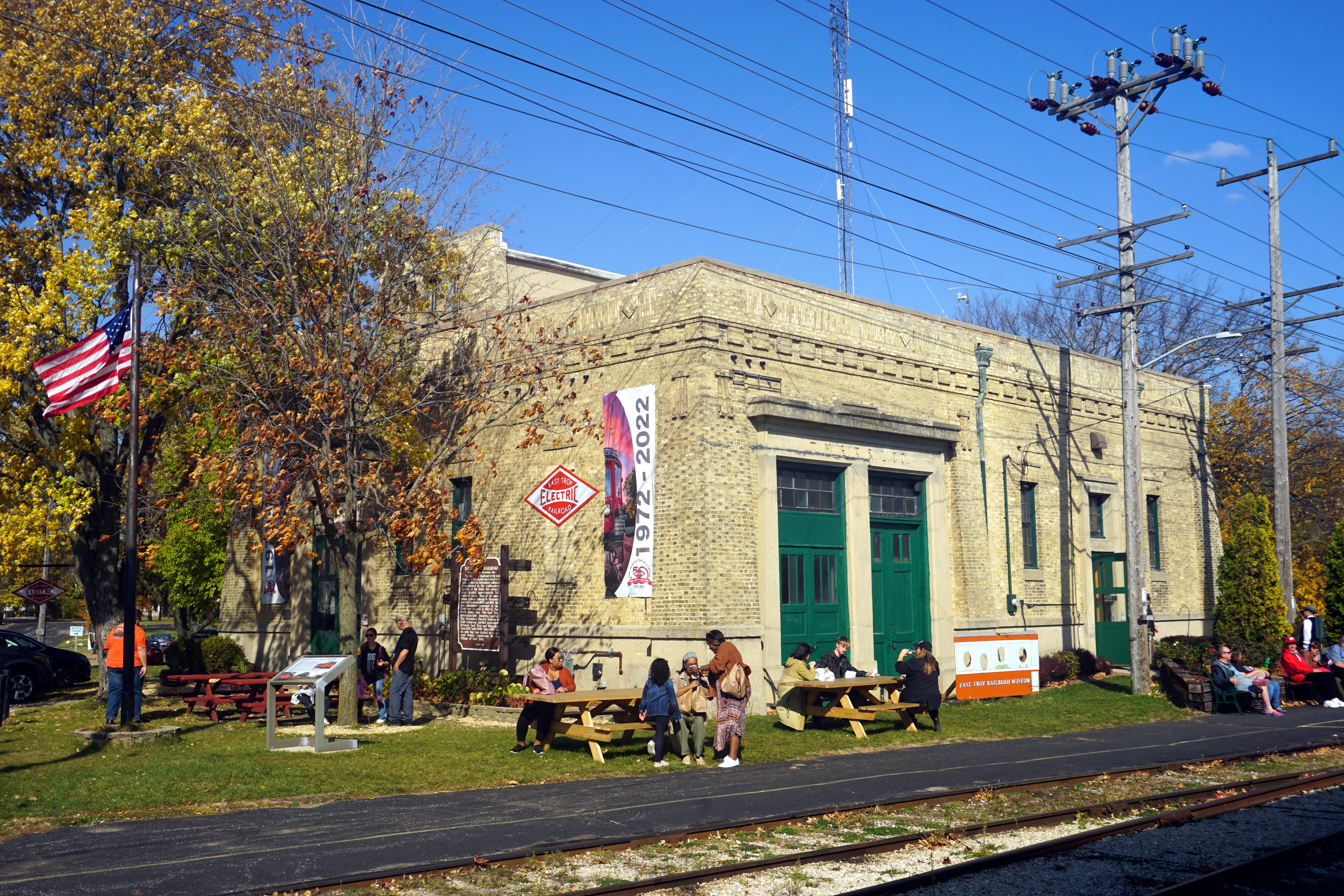
Exterior of the East Troy Railroad Museum

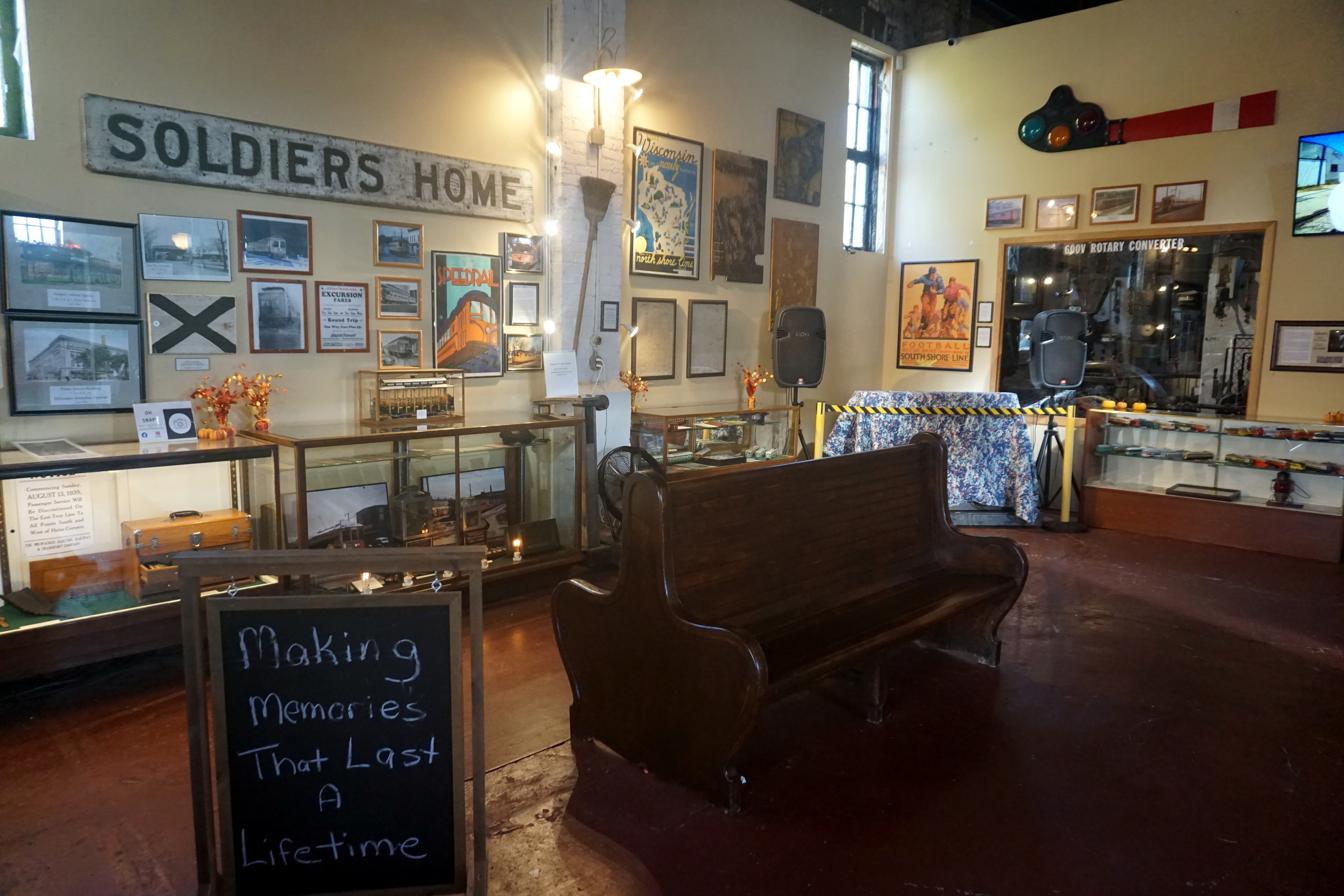
Interior of the East Troy Railroad Museum

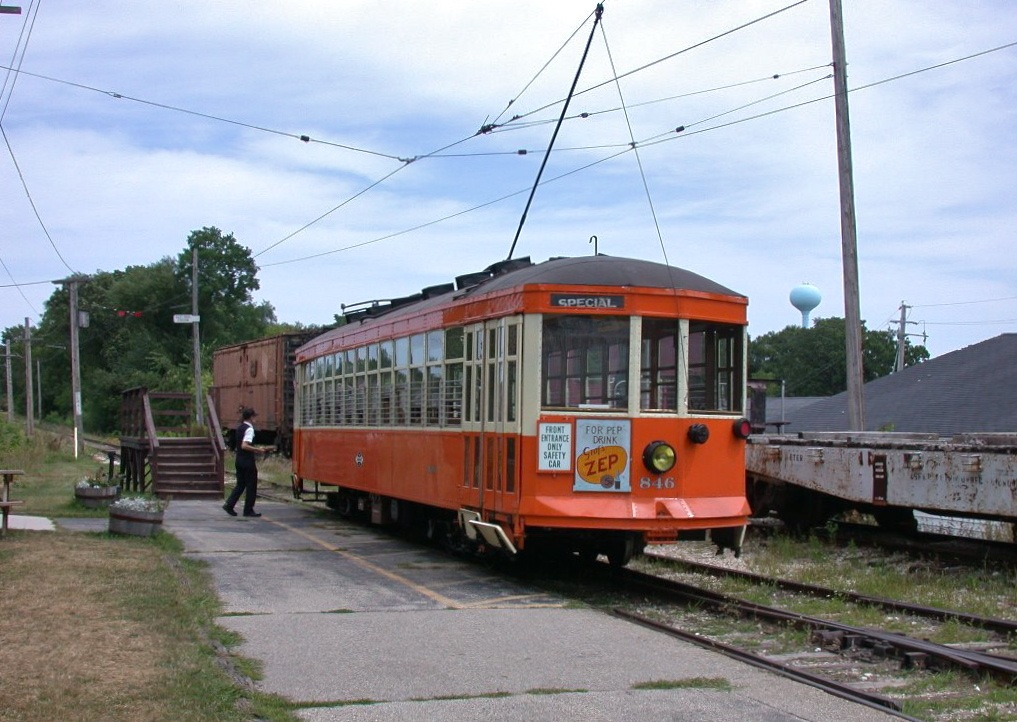
Ex-Milwaukee streetcar 846 operating on the East Troy line in 2006

== See also ==
- John I. Beggs
