= ATO Congresium =

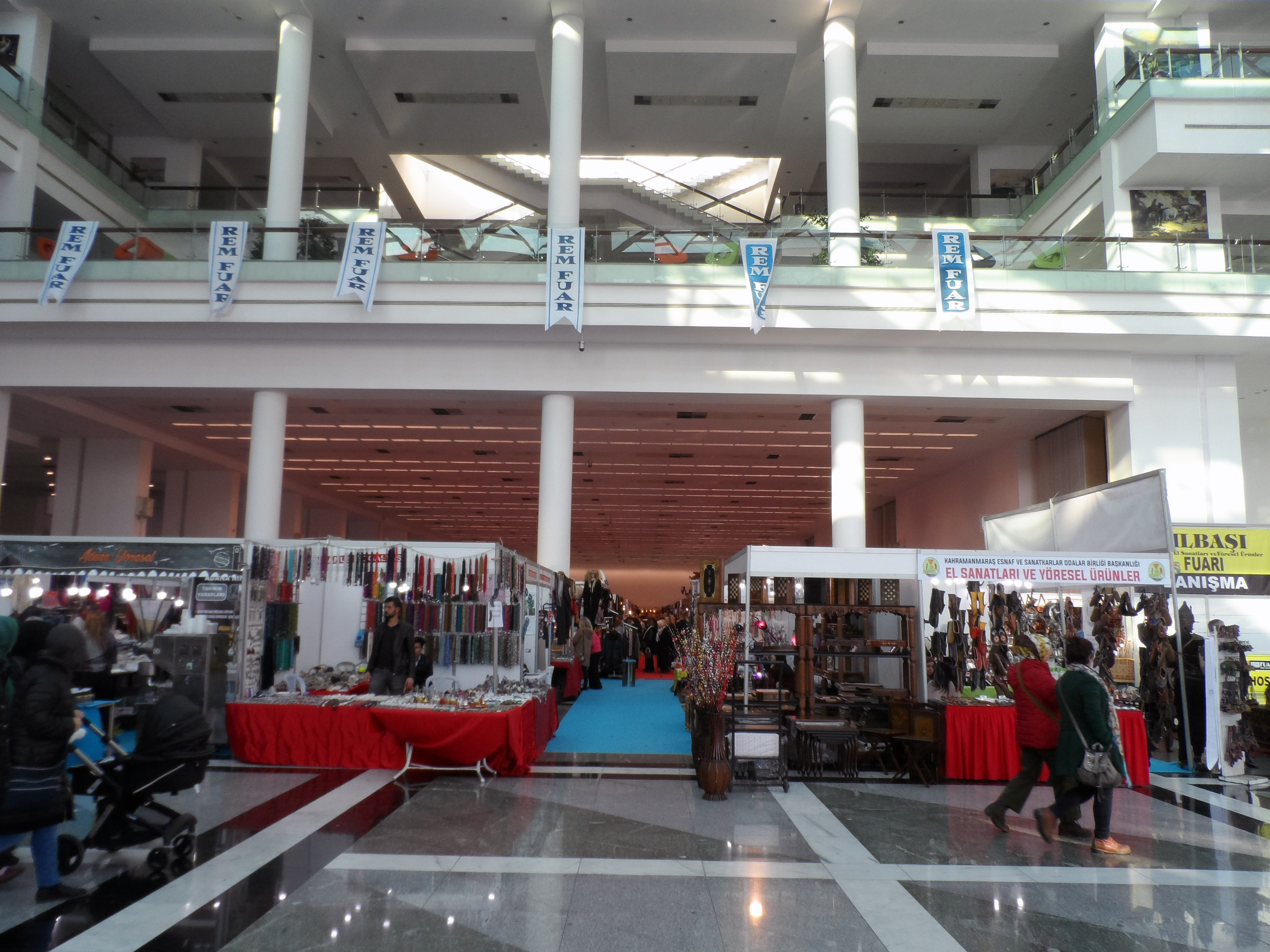
ATO Congresium (during an exhibition)

The ATO Congresium is an international convention and exhibition center in Ankara, Turkey. It is a property of the Ankara Trade Chamber (ATO) (Turkish: Ankara Ticaret Odası). It is at 39°54′41″N 32°48′11″E on Söğütözü Boulevard at Çankaya district. It opened on 14 September 2012.

Total area of the congresium is 80,000 square metres (860,000 sq ft), with 10,000 square metres (110,000 sq ft) of the ground floor reserved for various trade exhibitions. On the other floors, are two dividable halls of 5,770 square metres (62,100 sq ft) area; two lounges of 400 square metres (4,300 sq ft) area; 10 meeting rooms; an auditorium seating 3,107 people; and a 1,500 square metres (16,000 sq ft) ballroom. It also features dining facilities and two terraces with a view of Ankara.
