= The Milwaukee Electric Railway and Light Company =

Defunct interurban railway in Wisconsin

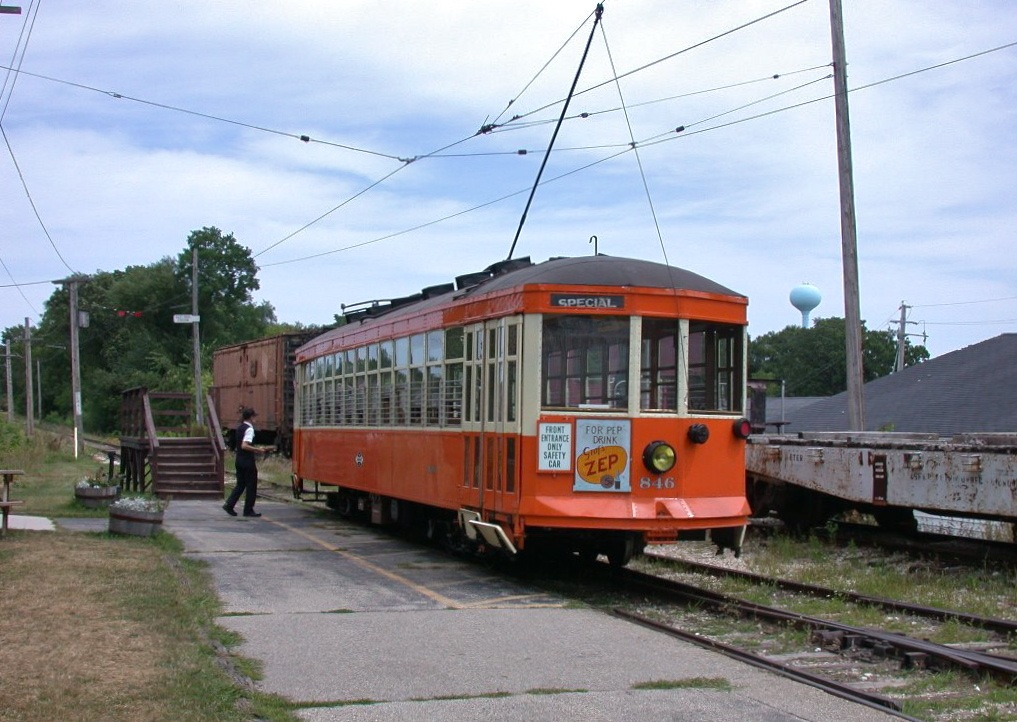
- Preserved 1920 vintage Milwaukee streetcar 846 at the East Troy Electric Railroad

Overview
- Headquarters: Milwaukee, Wisconsin
- Reporting mark: TMERL
- Locale: Wisconsin
- Dates of operation: 1896–1938
- Predecessor: The Milwaukee Electric Railway
- Successor: The Milwaukee Electric Railway & Transport Co.

Technical
- Track gauge: 4 ft 8 1/2 in (1,435 mm) standard gauge
- Electrification: 600 V DC
- Length: 191 miles (307 km)

The Milwaukee Electric Railway and Light Company (reporting mark TMERL), also referred to as the Milwaukee Interurban Lines or TMER&L, is a defunct railroad that operated in and around Milwaukee, Wisconsin. It was the largest electric railway and electric utility system in Wisconsin, and combined several of the earlier horsecar, steam dummy, and streetcar lines into one system. Its Milwaukee streetcar lines soon ran on most major streets and served most areas of the city. The interurban lines reached throughout southeastern Wisconsin. TMER&L also operated the streetcar lines in Appleton, Kenosha, and Racine, as well as its own switching operations at the Port Washington and Lakeside power plants.

The first electric streetcar in Milwaukee operated on Wells Street on April 3, 1890. The Waukesha Beach Railway was formally opened on June 25, 1895. The first interurban ran between Milwaukee and Kenosha on June 1, 1897. Other lines soon reached Watertown, Burlington, and East Troy. In 1922, TMER&L acquired the Milwaukee Northern Railway and added their Milwaukee to Sheboygan interurban line to the system.

During the Great Depression, services on streetcar and interurban lines were reduced, replaced with buses, abandoned, or sold. Abandonments ceased during World War II when gas and tires were rationed and defense workers needed transportation. After the war, riders returned to their automobiles and abandonments resumed. The last streetcar to run in Milwaukee and the entire state operated on Wells Street on March 2, 1958. Electric locomotives continued operating at the power plants until the early 1970s.

The last two remaining sections of interurban lines were to Hales Corners and Waukesha. They continued in operation until June 30, 1951 as part of the Milwaukee Rapid Transit and Speedrail Company's rapid transit service, as it had essentially lost the remainder of its postwar ridership following a collision in Greenfield, Wisconsin that killed 8 people and injured around 40, just the year before. The outer end of the East Troy branch (beyond Mukwonago) continues to operate as the East Troy Electric Railroad, a 7-mile (11 km) long heritage railroad. There were plans to extend the Watertown line to Madison, the East Troy line to Delavan, and the Burlington line to Lake Geneva. However, none of these plans came to fruition.

== Gallery ==
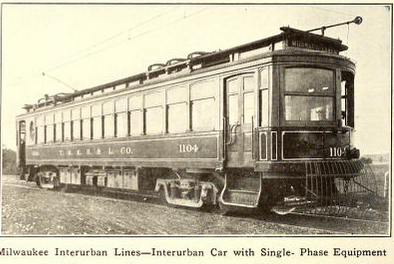
TMER&L interurban, circa 1911

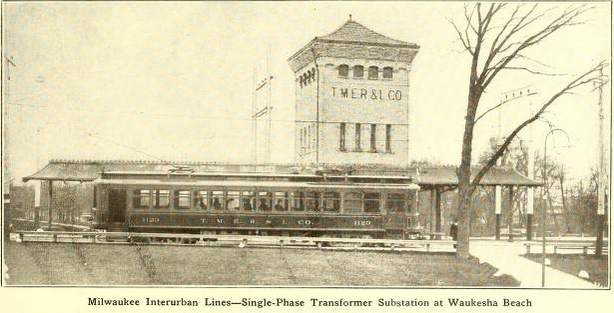
The Interurban station at Waukesha Beach, circa 1911

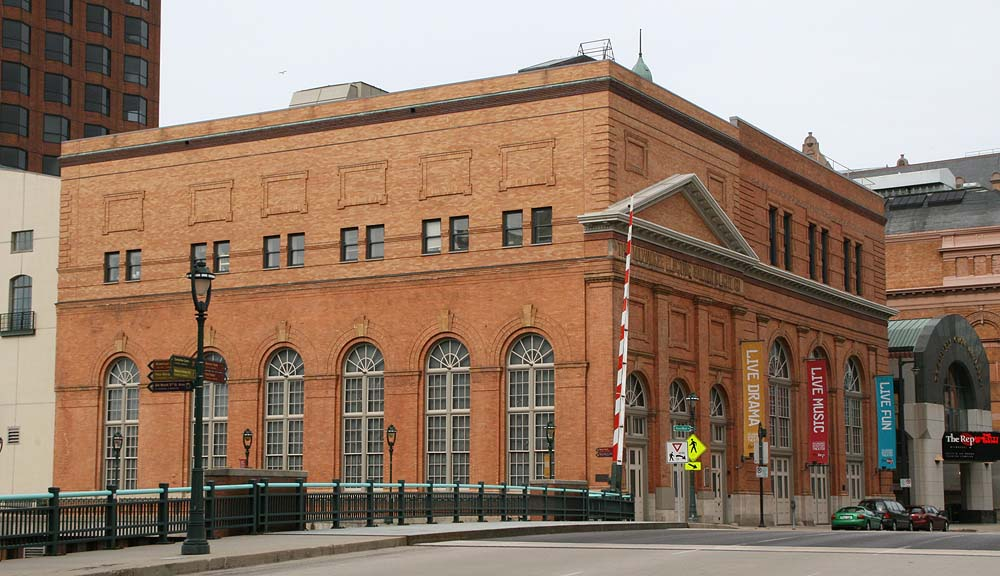
The Oneida Street Station, also known as the East Wells Power Plant, was a revolutionary power plant belonging to TMER&L. It is now on the National Register of Historic Places.
