= Troy, Vermont =

- Town
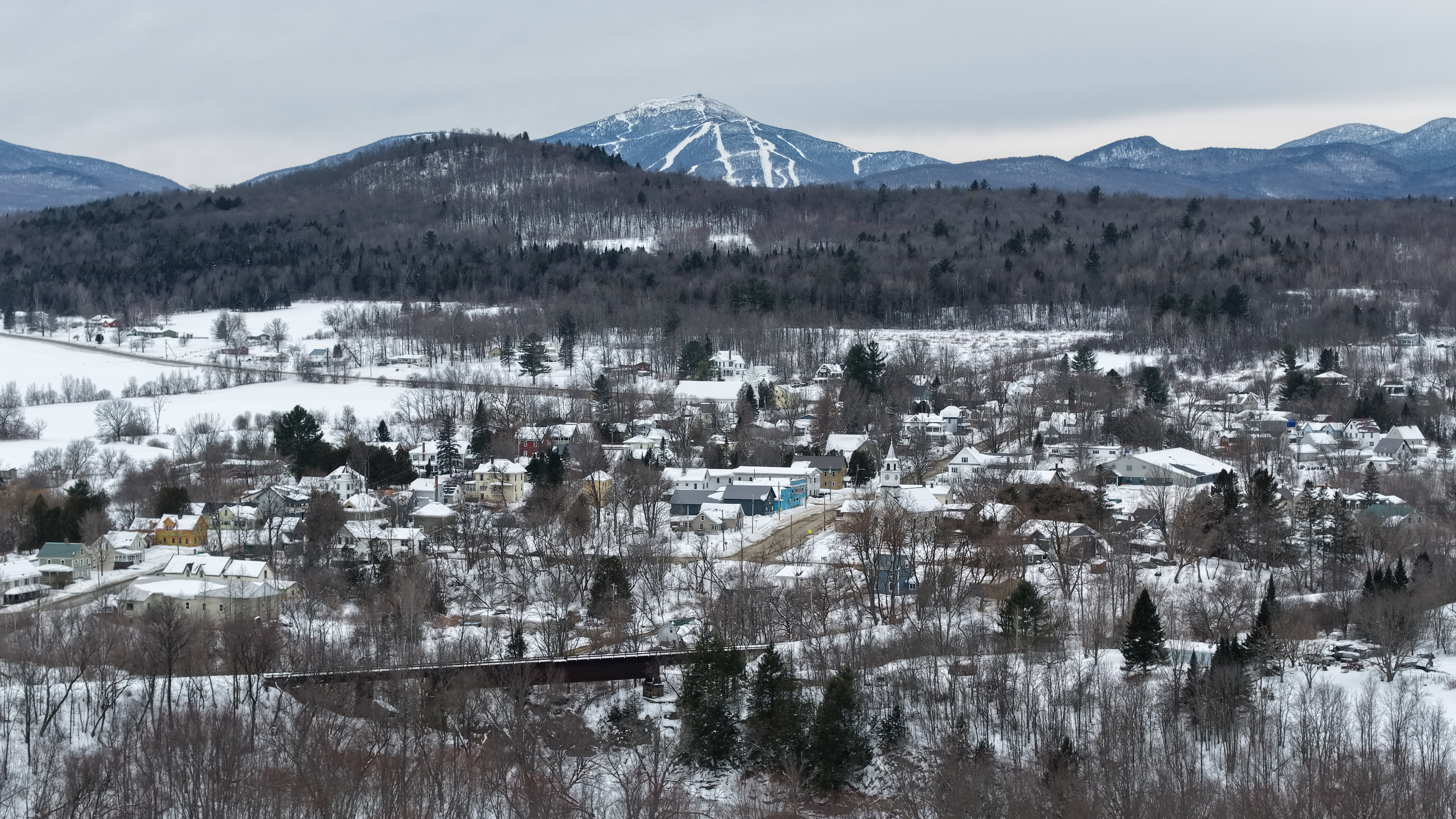
- North Troy, Vermont, from the northeast

- Logo

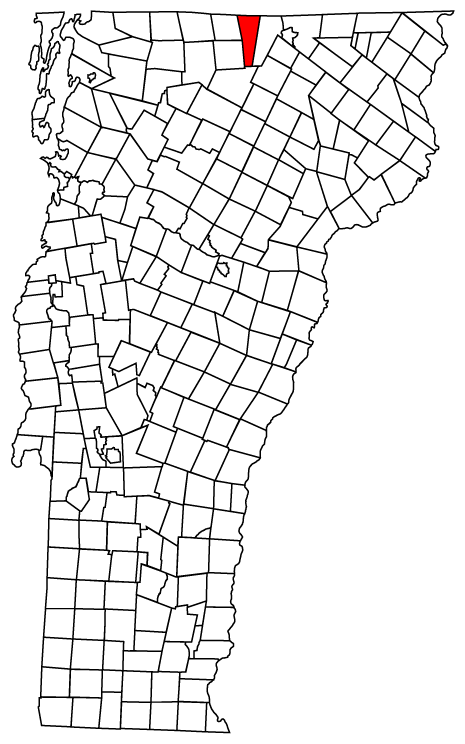
- Located in Orleans County, Vermont
- Coordinates: 44°56′27″N 72°23′07″W
- Country: United States
- State: Vermont
- County: Orleans
- Chartered: October 28, 1801
- Communities: Troy; North Troy

Area
  - Total: 36.1 sq mi (93.4 km^{2})
  - Land: 36.1 sq mi (93.4 km^{2})
  - Water: 0 sq mi (0.0 km^{2})
- Elevation: 965 ft (294 m)

Population (2020)
  - Total: 1,722
  - Density: 48/sq mi (18.4/km^{2})
- Time zone: UTC-5 (EST)
  - Summer (DST): UTC-4 (EDT)
- ZIP Codes: 05868 (Troy); 05859 (North Troy); 05874 (Westfield)
- Area code: 802
- FIPS code: 50-73525
- GNIS feature ID: 1462230
- Website: www.troyvt.gov

Troy is a town in Orleans County, Vermont, United States. The population was 1,722 at the 2020 census. Troy contains two villages: the unincorporated village of Troy, and the incorporated village of North Troy.

== Government ==
=== Town ===
- Moderator – Robert Starr
- Selectboard Chairman – Robert Langlands
- Town Clerk – Terri Medley
- Treasurer – Terri Medley
- Delinquent tax collector – Terri Medley
- Lister – Eric McCann, Karen Rinner, Helene Croteau
- Grand Juror – Robert Bishop
- Road budget – $460,119

Robert Starr has been moderator for fifty years.

=== School District ===
Schools are operated by North Country Supervisory Union.

- Board Member, North Country Union High School – Rosemary Mayhew
- Director, School Board – Cliff Forster
- Board members – Carol Currier, Richard Wells Jr., Gaston Bathalon, Andre Desautels
- Principal – Chris Young
- Budget – $2,975,840

=== Services ===
The town has two departments providing local services to residents:

- Water Department – providing water to residents and businesses
- Highway Department – maintaining local roads

There are two fire departments serving Troy:

- Troy Volunteer Fire Department – 1 station, equipped with an engine, tanker, tower ladder and rescue truck
- North Troy Volunteer Fire Department – 1 station, equipped with an engine, tanker, and rescue truck.

Both fire departments are members of North East Mutual Aid, providing and/or receiving assistance from fire departments in Mansonville & Potton in Southern Quebec, Canada.

EMS: Mississquoi Valley Ambulance Service-1 station, a combined volunteer/paid agency providing paramedic level care.

== Geography ==
According to the United States Census Bureau, the town has a total area of 36.1 square miles (93.4 km^{2}), all land.

== History ==
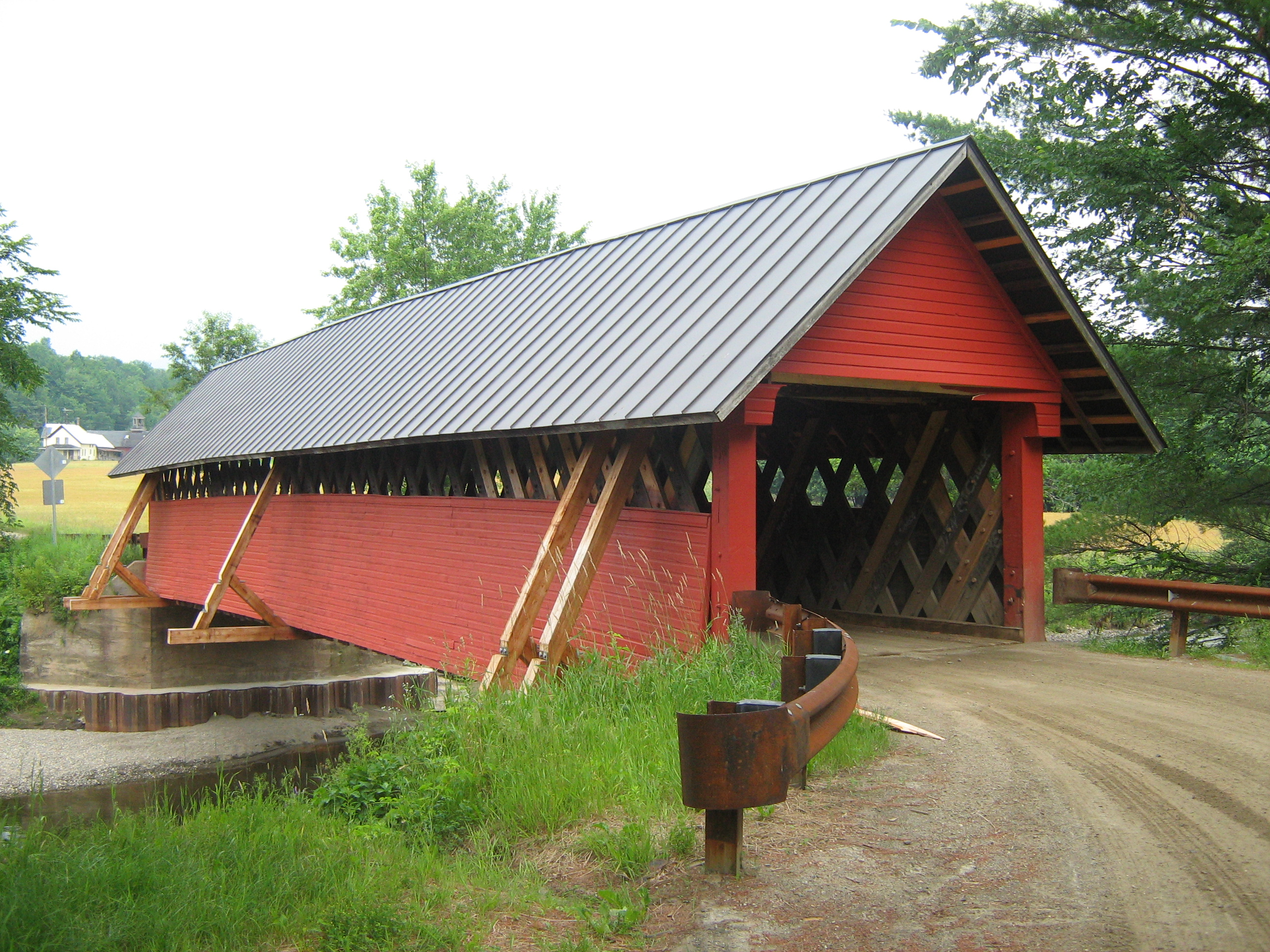
River Road Covered Bridge in Troy

Troy was chartered as "Missisquoi." It once produced over 400 short tons (360 t) of cast iron annually.

In the winter of 1799, a small party of American Indians, led by their chief, Captain Susap, joined the colonists at Troy, built their camps on the river and wintered near them. These Indians were nearly starving, which probably arose from the moose and deer, which formerly abounded here, being destroyed by the settlers. Their principal employment was making baskets, birch-bark cups and pails, and other Indian trinkets. They left in the spring and never returned. One of the party was a Native American woman, Molly Orcutt, who became quite noted among the settlers as a healer. She was found dead on Mount Whitecap, in East Andover, Maine, in 1817, having died, it is believed, at an age of 140 years.

Dr. Levi Moore and A.j. Rowell were Underground Railroad agents before the Civil War.

In one of the stranger chapters in Vermont history, researcher and scientist Gerald Bull constructed the Space Research Corporation in Highwater the town's Quebec neighboring city, in 1967. His intent was to fire research packages into orbit using heavy artillery. This laboratory straddled the Vermont border. Bull was ultimately imprisoned for violating international regulations regarding an embargo on South Africa. This resulted in the bankruptcy of his corporation.

In 1998, a flood damaged the generator at Bakers Falls dam. The 600 kW generator produced an annual output of 1,500 MW.

In 2010, the Troy Elementary School had the highest percentage of students qualifying for free lunch in the county, 73%. The state average was 31%.

== Demographics ==
Historical population
| Census | Pop. | Note | %± |
|---|---|---|---|
| 1810 | 231 | | — |
| 1820 | 227 | | −1.7% |
| 1830 | 608 | | 167.8% |
| 1840 | 855 | | 40.6% |
| 1850 | 1,008 | | 17.9% |
| 1860 | 1,246 | | 23.6% |
| 1870 | 1,355 | | 8.7% |
| 1880 | 1,522 | | 12.3% |
| 1890 | 1,673 | | 9.9% |
| 1900 | 1,467 | | −12.3% |
| 1910 | 1,686 | | 14.9% |
| 1920 | 1,869 | | 10.9% |
| 1930 | 1,898 | | 1.6% |
| 1940 | 1,869 | | −1.5% |
| 1950 | 1,786 | | −4.4% |
| 1960 | 1,613 | | −9.7% |
| 1970 | 1,457 | | −9.7% |
| 1980 | 1,498 | | 2.8% |
| 1990 | 1,609 | | 7.4% |
| 2000 | 1,564 | | −2.8% |
| 2010 | 1,662 | | 6.3% |
| 2020 | 1,722 | | 3.6% |
U.S. Decennial Census

As of the census of 2000, there were 1,564 people, 617 households, and 431 families residing in the town. The population density was 43.4 people per square mile (16.7/km^{2}). There were 734 housing units at an average density of 20.4 per square mile (7.9/km^{2}). The racial makeup of the town was 98.21% White, 0.06% African American, 0.38% Native American, 0.26% Asian, 0.19% from other races, and 0.90% from two or more races. Hispanic or Latino of any race were 0.32% of the population.

There were 617 households, out of which 32.4% had children under the age of 18 living with them, 55.4% were married couples living together, 8.8% had a female householder with no husband present, and 30.0% were non-families. 21.4% of all households were made up of individuals, and 9.9% had someone living alone who was 65 years of age or older. The average household size was 2.53 and the average family size was 2.94.

In the town, the population was spread out, with 25.8% under the age of 18, 8.6% from 18 to 24, 28.1% from 25 to 44, 24.9% from 45 to 64, and 12.7% who were 65 years of age or older. The median age was 37 years. For every 100 females, there were 101.0 males. For every 100 females age 18 and over, there were 98.0 males.

The median income for a household in the town was $31,705, and the median income for a family was $35,104. Males had a median income of $26,576 versus $19,766 for females. The per capita income for the town was $13,968. About 4.9% of families and 11.0% of the population were below the poverty line, including 8.7% of those under age 18 and 19.2% of those age 65 or over.

== Notable people ==
- Amasa Tracy, Medal of Honor recipient
- Tom Velk, contemporary libertarian economist
