= Pewaukee Lake =

Lake in the state of Wisconsin, United States

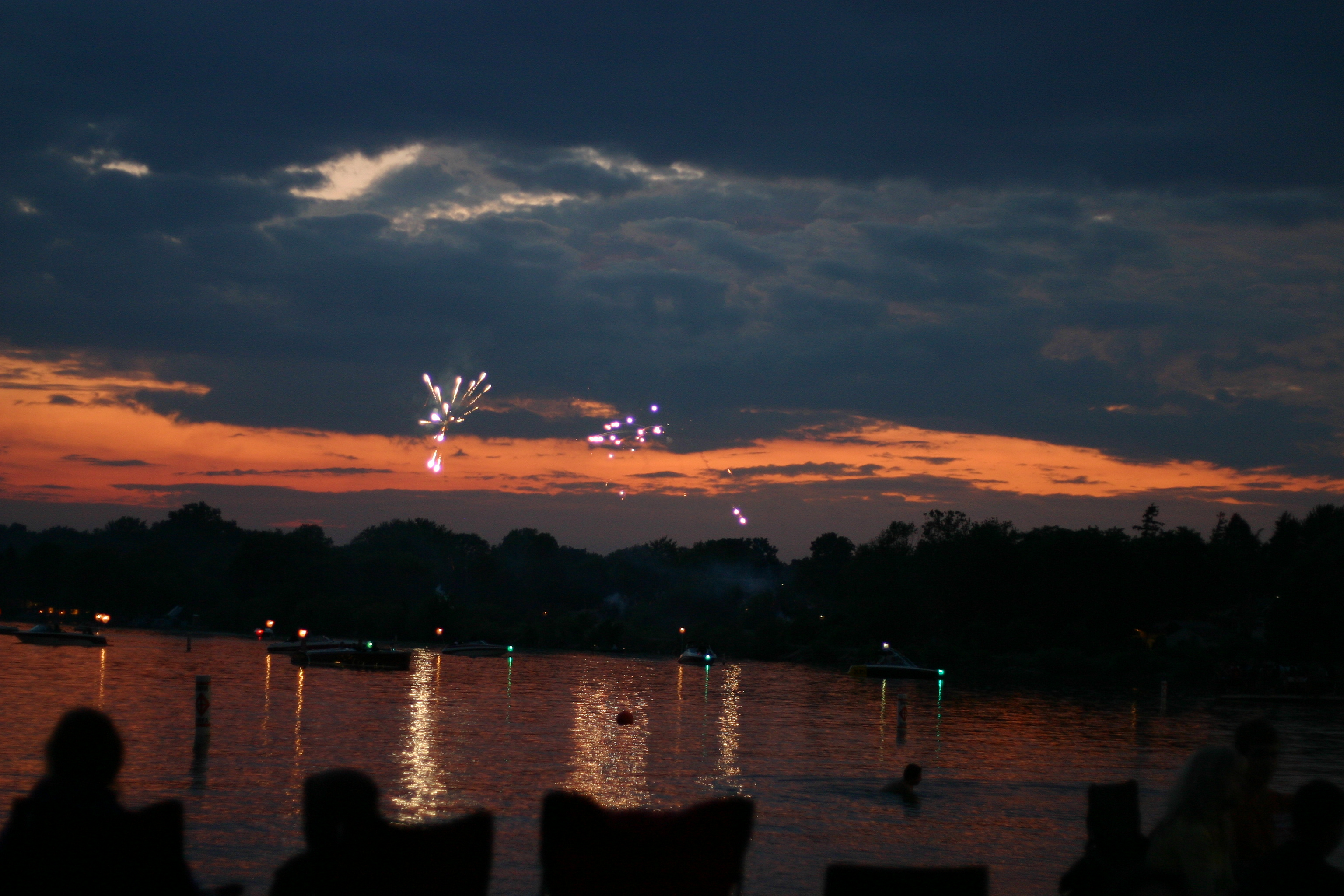
- Independence Day fireworks over Pewaukee Lake

- Location within Wisconsin Location within the United States
- Location: Waukesha County, Wisconsin
- Coordinates: 43°05′05″N 088°15′51″W
- Basin countries: United States
- Surface area: 2,437 acres (986 ha)
- Average depth: 15 ft (4.6 m)
- Max. depth: 46 ft (14 m)
- Surface elevation: 853 ft (260 m)

Pewaukee Lake is a lake located in Waukesha County, Wisconsin, United States. The largest lake in Waukesha County's "Lake Country", Pewaukee Lake is approximately five miles (8 km) long and one mile (1.6 km) wide, with an average depth of 15 feet (4.6 m) sloping to a maximum depth of 46 feet (14 m).

The lake is known for its inland sailing races. National sailing events take place annually and are often hosted by the Pewaukee Yacht Club located on the southern shore of the lake.

The lake's fish include bluegill, largemouth bass, smallmouth bass, muskellunge ("muskie"), northern pike, tiger muskellunge ("tiger muskie"), walleye, yellow perch and non-native carp.

Pewaukee Lake experienced high waters and flooding during the spring and summer of 2008. The floods caused millions of dollars in damages to the surrounding area.

== History ==
Pewaukee Lake has long been a summertime destination for Milwaukee residents. In winter months, ice was often removed from the lake for residents of Milwaukee in the 1800s.
