= Troy High School (Texas) =

Location
- 205 North Waco Road; Troy, Bell County, Texas 76579-0409; United States; 31.211273°N 97.305204°W

Information
- School type: Public, high school
- Locale: Rural: Fringe
- School district: Troy ISD
- NCES School ID: 484326004913
- Principal: Randy Hicks
- Teaching staff: 31.39 (on an FTE basis)
- Grades: 9–12
- Enrollment: 497 (2023–2024)
- Student to teacher ratio: 15.83
- Colors: Maroon & White
- Athletics conference: UIL Class 3A
- Mascot: Trojan/Trojanette
- Website: Troy High School

Troy High School is a public high school located in Troy, Texas and classified as a 3A school by the University Interscholastic League. It is part of the Troy Independent School District located in northern Bell County. During 2022–2023, Troy High School had an enrollment of 487 students and a student to teacher ratio of 15.29. The school received an overall rating of "B" from the Texas Education Agency for the 2024–2025 school year.

== Athletics ==
The Troy Trojans compete in the following sports:

- Baseball
- Basketball
- Cross Country
- Football
- Golf
- Powerlifting
- Softball
- Tennis
- Track and Field
- Volleyball

=== State Titles ===
- Girls Basketball -
  - 1985(2A)
- Softball -
  - 2000(2A), 2007(2A)

==== State Finalists ====
- Softball –
  - 2005(2A)
