= Troy, Texas =

- City
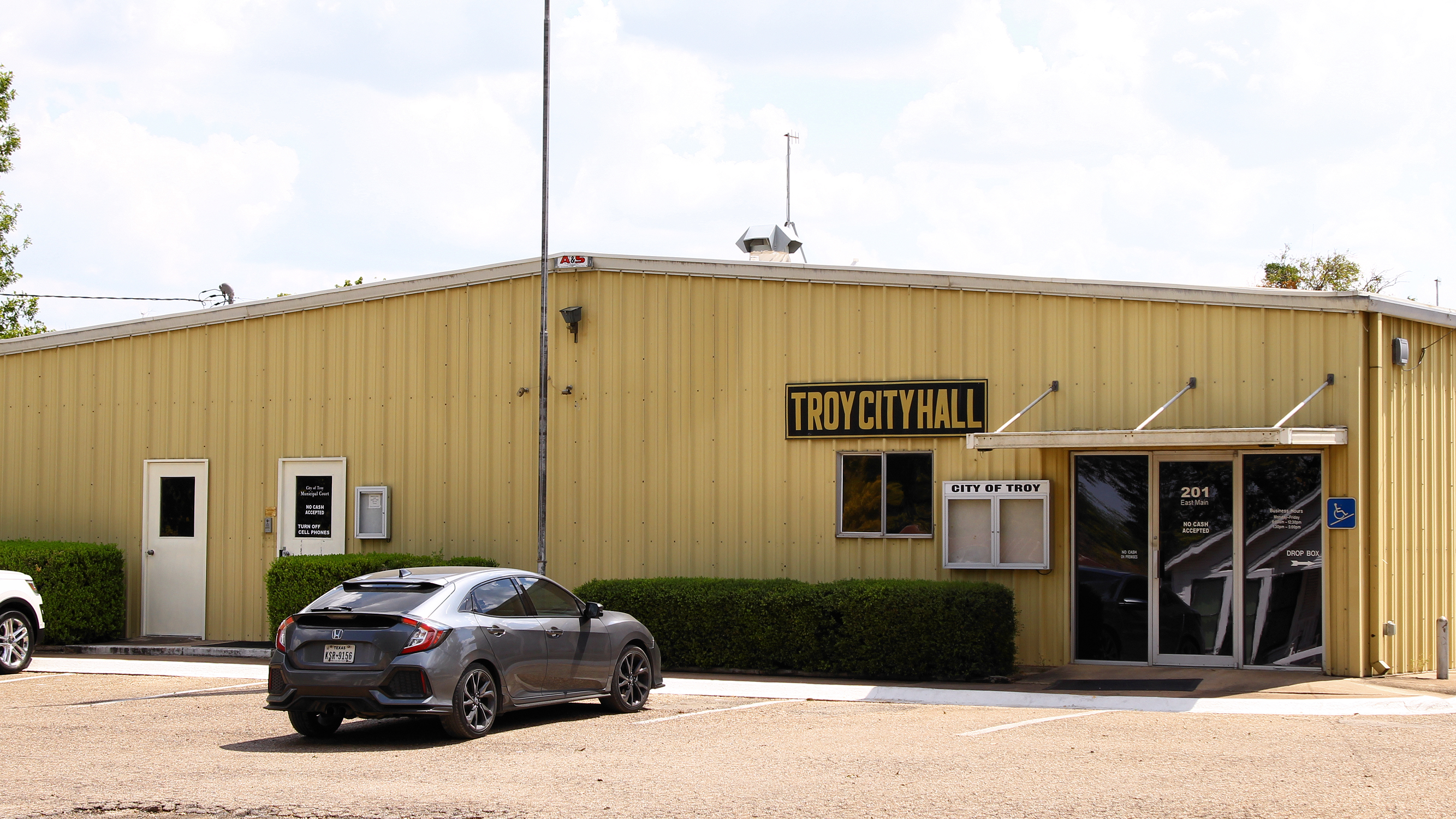
- Troy City Hall

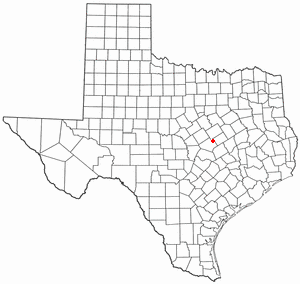
- Location of Troy, Texas

- Coordinates: 31°12′00″N 97°18′07″W
- Country: United States
- State: Texas
- County: Bell

Area
  - Total: 4.66 sq mi (12.08 km^{2})
  - Land: 4.65 sq mi (12.05 km^{2})
  - Water: 0.0077 sq mi (0.02 km^{2})
- Elevation: 692 ft (211 m)

Population (2020)
  - Total: 2,375
  - Density: 433.2/sq mi (167.26/km^{2})
- Time zone: UTC-6 (Central (CST))
  - Summer (DST): UTC-5 (CDT)
- ZIP code: 76579
- Area code: 254
- FIPS code: 48-73748
- GNIS feature ID: 2412100
- Website: www.cityoftroy.us

Troy is a city in Bell County, Texas, United States. The population was 2,375 at the 2020 census. It is part of the Killeen–Temple–Fort Hood Metropolitan Statistical Area.

== Geography ==
Troy is located in northern Bell County along Interstate 35. It is 8 miles (13 km) north of Temple and 26 miles (42 km) south of Waco.

According to the United States Census Bureau, the city has a total area of 4.0 square miles (10.4 km^{2}), of which 0.008 square miles (0.02 km^{2}), or 0.20%, are covered by water.

=== Climate ===
The climate in this area is characterized by hot, humid summers and generally mild to cool winters. According to the Köppen climate classification, Troy has a humid subtropical climate, Cfa on climate maps.

== History ==
Troy was established around a railroad station of the Missouri–Kansas–Texas Railroad in 1882. It replaced an older village about two miles north of the current city and which is referred to as Old Troy. Originally, the new town was known as New Troy. A weekly newspaper was established at Troy in 1892.

For a brief period in the 1990s, Troy renamed itself Troy Aikman, Texas, in honor of the Dallas Cowboys Super Bowl-winning quarterback. Signs posted at the city limits on I-35 reflected the name change.

== Demographics ==
Historical population
| Census | Pop. | Note | %± |
|---|---|---|---|
| 1890 | 219 | | — |
| 1970 | 542 | | — |
| 1980 | 1,353 | | 149.6% |
| 1990 | 1,395 | | 3.1% |
| 2000 | 1,378 | | −1.2% |
| 2010 | 1,645 | | 19.4% |
| 2020 | 2,375 | | 44.4% |
U.S. Decennial Census

=== 2020 census ===
As of the 2020 census, Troy had a population of 2,375. The median age was 32.6 years. 32.1% of residents were under the age of 18 and 11.3% of residents were 65 years of age or older. For every 100 females there were 98.2 males, and for every 100 females age 18 and over there were 94.2 males age 18 and over.

83.6% of residents lived in urban areas, while 16.4% lived in rural areas.

There were 819 households and 755 families residing in Troy, of which 48.1% had children under the age of 18 living in them. Of all households, 49.0% were married-couple households, 15.6% were households with a male householder and no spouse or partner present, and 27.4% were households with a female householder and no spouse or partner present. About 19.9% of all households were made up of individuals and 9.0% had someone living alone who was 65 years of age or older.

There were 914 housing units, of which 10.4% were vacant. The homeowner vacancy rate was 3.7% and the rental vacancy rate was 13.4%.

Racial composition as of the 2020 census
| Race | Number | Percent |
|---|---|---|
| White | 1,802 | 75.9% |
| Black or African American | 85 | 3.6% |
| American Indian and Alaska Native | 32 | 1.3% |
| Asian | 8 | 0.3% |
| Native Hawaiian and Other Pacific Islander | 1 | 0.0% |
| Some other race | 142 | 6.0% |
| Two or more races | 305 | 12.8% |
| Hispanic or Latino (of any race) | 533 | 22.4% |

=== 2000 census ===
As of the census of 2000, 1,378 people, 508 households, and 394 families resided in the city. The population density was 387.5 inhabitants per square mile (149.6/km^{2}). The 527 housing units averaged 148.2/sq mi (57.2/km^{2}). The racial makeup of the city was 89.26% White, 1.16% African American, 0.07% Native American, 0.29% Asian, 0.07% Pacific Islander, 7.40% from other races, and 1.74% from two or more races. Hispanics or Latinos of any race were 16.11% of the population.

Of the 508 households, 45.1% had children under the age of 18 living with them, 57.3% were married couples living together, 17.5% had a female householder with no husband present, and 22.4% were not families. About 21.3% of all households were made up of individuals, and 11.0% had someone living alone who was 65 years of age or older. The average household size was 2.71 and the average family size was 3.11.

In the city, the population was distributed as 31.9% under the age of 18, 7.5% from 18 to 24, 30.1% from 25 to 44, 19.7% from 45 to 64, and 10.8% who were 65 years of age or older. The median age was 34 years. For every 100 females, there were 88.0 males. For every 100 females age 18 and over, there were 83.8 males.

The median income for a household in the city was $39,250, and for a family was $42,188. Males had a median income of $35,134 versus $24,559 for females. The per capita income for the city was $15,974. About 7.6% of families and 10.7% of the population were below the poverty line, including 13.6% of those under age 18 and 22.7% of those age 65 or over.

== Education ==
Public education in Troy is provided by schools in the Troy Independent School District: Mays Elementary School, Troy Elementary School, Raymond Mays Middle School, and Troy High School.
