= North Troy, Vermont =

- Village
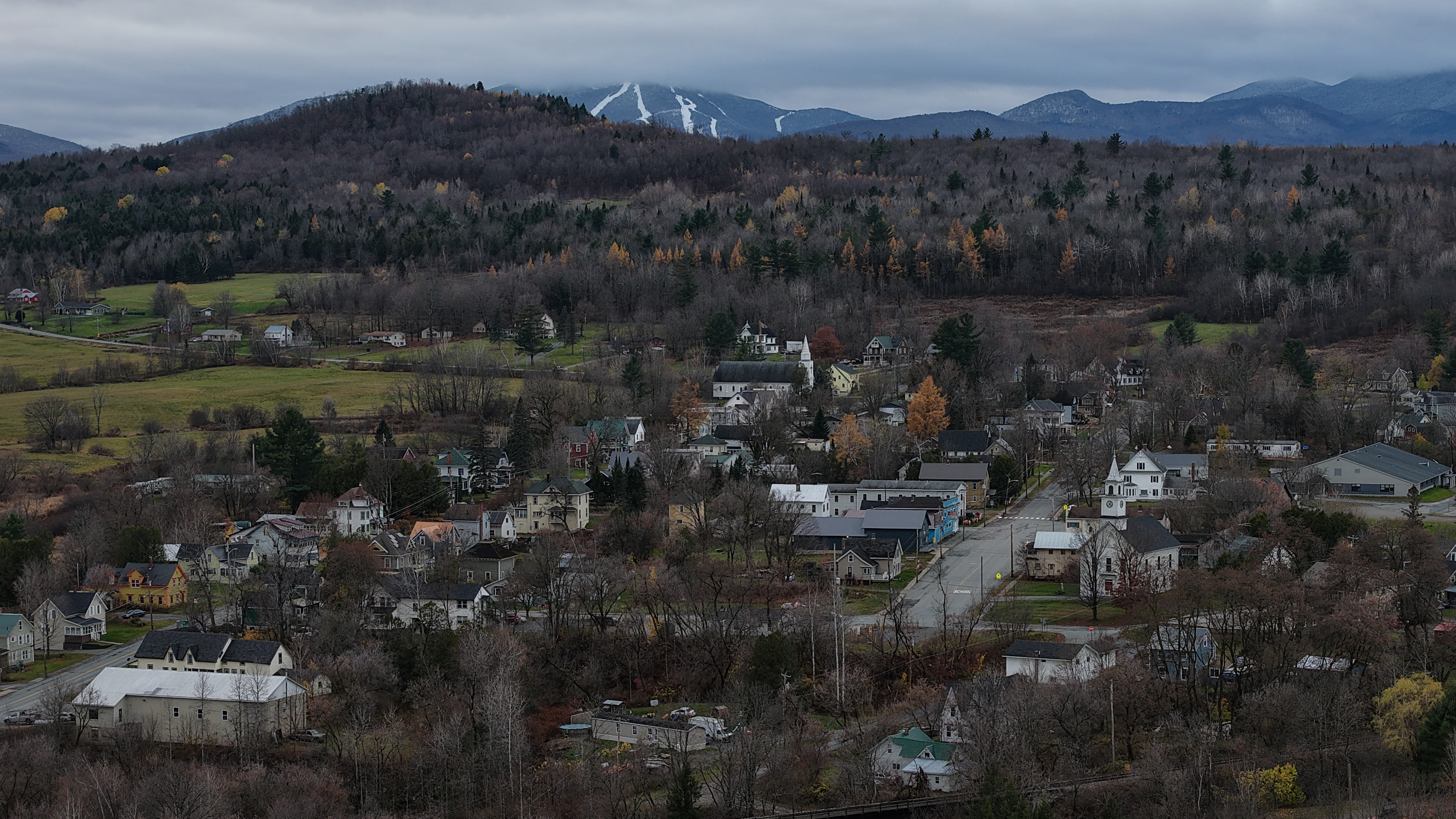
- North Troy, VT, from the northeast

- Location within Vermont Location within the United States
- Coordinates: 44°59′57″N 72°24′18″W
- Country: United States
- State: Vermont
- County: Orleans
- Town: Troy

Area
  - Total: 1.92 sq mi (4.97 km^{2})
  - Land: 1.87 sq mi (4.85 km^{2})
  - Water: 0.046 sq mi (0.12 km^{2})
- Elevation: 607 ft (185 m)

Population (2020)
  - Total: 631
  - Density: 337/sq mi (130.1/km^{2})
- Time zone: UTC-5 (Eastern (EST))
  - Summer (DST): UTC-4 (EDT)
- ZIP code: 05859
- Area code: 802
- FIPS code: 50-52075
- GNIS feature ID: 2378321
- Website: www.troyvt.gov/village

North Troy is a village in the town of Troy, Orleans County, Vermont, United States. The population was 631 at the 2020 census. It is located 1.3 miles (2.1 km) south of the Canada-US border.

== History ==
There were Winter Carnivals from 1940 to 1942. In 1942, 4,000 people attended. There were dog sled races and ski jumping contests.

Until 2007, the village was unique for depending neither on the town constable nor the county sheriff for law enforcement but had a police force of its own. While it was not village policy to have fines as a money maker, the department did break even. It earned $39,070.12 in fines and other revenue in 2006.

== Geography ==
According to the United States Census Bureau, the village has a total area of 1.9 square miles (5.0 km^{2}), all land.

== Demographics ==
Historical population
Census	Pop.	Note	%±
1880	469		—
1890	600		27.9%
1900	562		−6.3%
1910	771		37.2%
1920	1,072		39.0%
1930	1,045		−2.5%
1940	1,077		3.1%
1950	1,057		−1.9%
1960	961		−9.1%
1970	774		−19.5%
1980	717		−7.4%
1990	723		0.8%
2000	593		−18.0%
2010	620		4.6%
2020	631		1.8%
U.S. Decennial Census

As of the census of 2020, there were 631 people, 221 households, and 125 families residing in the village. The population density was 337.4 people per square mile (130.1/km^{2}). There were 310 housing units at an average density of 165.8/sq mi (63.9/km^{2}). The racial makeup of the village was 91.76% White, 2.22% Native American, 0.63% Black/African American, 0.48% Asian, and 4.75% from two or more races.

There were 221 households, out of which 23.1% had children under the age of 18 living with them, 46.2% were married couples living together, 31.2% had a female householder with no spouse present, and 10.0% had a male householder with no spouse present. 34.8% of all households were made up of individuals, and 18.1% had someone living alone who was 65 years of age or older. The average household size was 2.58 and the average family size was 3.39.

In the village, the population was spread out, with 23.45% under the age of 18, 10.6% from 18 to 24, 30.0% from 25 to 44, 19.7% from 45 to 64, and 15.7% who were 65 years of age or older. The median age was 35.8 years. For every 100 females, there were 92.3 males.

The median income for a household in the village was $55,486, and the median income for a family was $83,438. The per capita income for the village was $25,829. About 11.7% of the population were below the poverty line, including 19.4% of those under age 18 and 17.9% of those age 65 or over.

== Notable people ==
- Samuel Douglass, member of the Vermont Senate.
- Amasa Tracy, recipient of the Medal of Honor.
- Tom Velk, modern libertarian economist.
