= KANG-TV =

Television station in Waco, Texas (1953–1955)

- Waco, Texas; United States
- Channels: Analog: 34 (UHF)

Programming
- Affiliations: ABC, CBS, DuMont

Ownership
- Owner: Texas Broadcasting Company

History
- First air date: November 1, 1953
- Last air date: December 31, 1955

Technical information
- ERP: 18.6 kW
- HAAT: 500 ft (152 m)
- Transmitter coordinates: 31°32′08″N 91°11′21″W

KANG-TV (channel 34) was a television station in Waco, Texas, United States. It was owned by the Texas Broadcasting Company and was the first station to serve Waco, beginning on November 1, 1953, and closing down on December 31, 1955. The station's assets and CBS network affiliation were acquired by KWTX-TV (channel 10), and KANG-TV's owners, the Texas Broadcasting Company run by Lady Bird Johnson, acquired 29 percent of KWTX television and radio.

== Construction ==
When the Federal Communications Commission (FCC) lifted its freeze on television station applications in 1952, Waco had received one channel in the superior very high frequency (VHF) band with two local radio stations fighting for it: KWTX and WACO. It also had a commercial channel assignment in the new ultra high frequency (UHF) band, channel 34. The Central Texas Television Company, owned by Hamilton car dealer and radio station owner Clyde L. Weatherby, filed for the UHF channel. Though the FCC initially asked for additional information about the company's financial qualifications, it granted the firm a construction permit for channel 34 on November 14, 1952.

Several months passed before meaningful activity began toward building the station. A manager was named in July, at which time it was decided not to build a tower atop the Medical Arts Building as originally proposed. In August, the FCC granted permission for the station to erect a 600-foot (180 m) tower on a site at the corner of Bosque Boulevard and Lake Air Drive, and construction would begin immediately on studio facilities there. By this time, the station had already signed for affiliation with ABC.

After the first test pattern aired on October 17, the station began commercial broadcasting at 1:30 p.m. on November 1, 1953, four hours before KCEN-TV (channel 6) in Temple, the region's NBC affiliate and a VHF station. Originally, the station had a single camera to produce local programming at its studio. In addition to ABC, KANG-TV was an affiliate of the DuMont Television Network at launch, though initially it had programming from all four major networks.

== Financial difficulties and sale to Texas Broadcasting Company ==
The arrival of a second new VHF station on channel 10 presented an immediate obstacle to KANG-TV's survival. As with other UHF stations in similarly disadvantaged markets, it petitioned the FCC to force its competitor to move from channel 10 to UHF channel 66; it claimed that it could not compete as the only UHF station in a market with effectively two VHF outlets (including Temple's KCEN-TV). The FCC rejected this proposal in October 1954 and awarded channel 10 to KWTX over WACO. In building the station, Weatherby later told Donald S. Thomas, a friend, that he believed there would be a longer fight between KWTX and WACO for channel 10—the comparative hearing phase took two weeks, a record for the time—and that he had overestimated the demand for a UHF television station that required converters or special all-channel sets to be viewed.

Faced with a bleak economic picture, in November, Central Texas Television Company filed to sell KANG-TV to the Texas Broadcasting Company, which owned KTBC radio and television in Austin, for $115,000 plus the assumption of $19,000 in debt. The sellers told the FCC that they had failed to secure sufficient advertising to prevent losses and that their deficit surpassed $145,000. The sale received swift FCC approval in early December; it brought KANG-TV under the ownership of Lady Bird Johnson, wife of then-senator Lyndon B. Johnson. Weatherby had been one of Lady Bird Johnson's classmates in college.

On April 3, 1955, KWTX-TV began telecasting. However, the new station had no network affiliation. KWTX officials attributed this to monopolistic behavior by Texas Broadcasting, whose KANG-TV continued to be the affiliate of CBS, ABC, and DuMont, and challenged a power increase proposed by KTBC-TV.

== Closure and legacy ==
On December 24, 1955, KANG-TV general manager J. C. Kellam and KWTX-TV general manager Buddy Bostick jointly announced that the stations would merge. The merged station would operate under KWTX's call letters and channel location. The KWTX Broadcasting Company acquired all of KANG's assets save the license and sold a minority stake to KANG's owners. At midnight on December 31, 1955, KANG-TV ceased broadcasting. KWTX-TV then inherited KANG's CBS affiliation, while KANG-TV's owners acquired a 30 percent stake in KWTX-TV. In a prepared statement, Kellam declared that the station had operated at a loss for its entire history and that the only way to prevent additional losses was to take it off the air. He and Lady Bird Johnson joined the KWTX board.

The KANG-TV studios were put up for lease and were used by two tenants after the television station closed. The first was a new church, the Western Heights Baptist Church. From 1961 to 1963, Success Motivation Institute (SMI), a Waco-based producer of motivational speech recordings and executive training courses, occupied the building, but this was temporary, and plans were in motion to construct a new facility for the company. The building was demolished in 1963 to make way for a new motel.

The association between KWTX's ownership and Johnson interests continued for more than 40 years after the merger of KANG-TV into KWTX-TV. The LBJ Holding Company continued to partly own the station into the 1990s.
