= KWTX =

KWTX may refer to:

- KWTX (AM), a radio station (1230 AM) licensed to Waco, Texas, United States
- KWTX-FM, a radio station (97.5 FM) licensed to Waco, Texas, United States
- KWTX-TV, a television station (channel 10) licensed to Waco, Texas, United States
