= KSSM =

Coordinates: 31.085°N 97.952°W

- Copperas Cove, Texas; United States
- Broadcast area: Killeen-Temple
- Frequency: 103.1 MHz
- Branding: My Kiss 103.1

Programming
- Format: Urban adult contemporary
- Affiliations: American Urban Radio Networks; Compass Media Networks; Premiere Networks

Ownership
- Owner: Townsquare Media; (Townsquare Media Killeen-Temple License, LLC)
- Sister stations: KLTD, KOOC, KTEM, KUSJ

History
- First air date: 1977
- Former call signs: KOOV (1977–2000)
- Call sign meaning: "Kiss FM"

Technical information
- Licensing authority: FCC
- Facility ID: 10054
- Class: C3
- ERP: 8,600 watts
- HAAT: 170 meters (560 ft)

Links
- Public license information: Public file; LMS
- Webcast: Listen live
- Website: mykiss1031.com

KSSM (103.1 FM, "My Kiss 103.1") is a commercial radio station licensed to Copperas Cove, Texas, and serving the Killeen-Temple radio market. The station is owned and operated by Townsquare Media and airs an urban adult contemporary radio format. The station's studios are located in Temple, and its transmitter is located southwest of Copperas Cove.

== History ==
=== KOOV ===
KOOV went on the air in early November 1977 following the frequency's allocation to the area in the mid-1970s. The station was owned by local businessman Ted Connell and radio personality Gaylon Christie. Christie was a local musician in Central Texas and was well known from his days at KTON-AM/FM in Belton, where he was general manager. Initially broadcasting from a studio in the Cove State Bank Building on Main Street in Copperas Cove, KOOV was known as "Cove Radio", billing itself as the "only station that really cares about Copperas Cove". Within a few years, the station developed more of a regional appeal, serving the Killeen/Fort Hood area.

For much of its early years, KOOV was programmed with a personality-driven country music format. Sales were good, and the station managed good ratings with a very high spot load. KOOV was a local full service station with news, weather, local sports, many local "remotes", and a tightly controlled playlist of country music hits of the day.

KOOV was always challenged by a poor signal in the hills of Central Texas because of its Class A status due to other nearby stations on the same or nearby frequencies. The original power was 3,000 watts, but lowered to 980 watts as the station's antenna was raised from 300 feet to 500 feet atop Hogg Mountain. In the early 1990s, the station finally was upgraded to Class C3, increasing its effective radiated power to 8,600 watts from a new self-supporting tower on the far west side of Copperas Cove near the Lampasas/Coryell County line. The upgrade gave KOOV solid signal over the fast-growing region from Lampasas on the west to Temple on the east.

KOOV's most famous on-air personality was Big Joe Lombardi who joined the station shortly after launch in 1977. Lombardi was first the news director, and a midday DJ. He was also popular at local clubs playing a mix of country and rock music. Lombardi started calling play-by-play for the Copperas Cove Bulldogs (later Bulldawgs) in 1978 and continued until his death in 2023. Known as the "voice of the Bulldawgs", Lombardi was the announcer for many Copperas Cove High School sports and supported community causes. When KOOV was sold in 2000, Lombardi took the CCHS games to Lampasas radio station KACQ-FM 101.9 (licensed to Lometa, TX.) through the successful seasons of the early 2000s, in the later years the coverage of Bulldawg football became internet only. At KOOV, Big Joe moved to the morning show in 1984, replacing station owner Gaylon Christie on AM Drive. Lombardi continued on the very popular morning show until the station sold in 2000. In 1992, he won CMA Small Market DJ of the year.

Another original and popular DJ was James Harrison who also started shortly after the station launched. James Harrison had a very successful run on KTON-AM/FM in Belton, TX. in the early-mid 1970s. After a few years as city manager for Nolanville, TX. Harrison joined his former KTON alumni at KOOV as afternoon drive DJ and operations manager. Former KTON program director Chuck Kelly moved to KOOV in 1981 as morning news anchor/news director and served in this role until the station sold in 2000.

In July 1978, local Copperas Cove High School student Mike Clay joined KOOV as a weekend DJ. Clay continued with KOOV through 1986 as a midday DJ and the station's engineer. Clay also called Copperas Cove Bulldog football with Joe Lombardi for 5 years. Clay left KOOV in 1986 to become the weekday weathercaster on KCEN-TV channel 6 in Temple, though he continued to provide weather reports on KOOV through 2000. Clay is currently the chief meteorologist for Bay News 9 in Tampa Bay.

Other KOOV originals were Alan Reynolds and Jim Jones. Reynolds and Jones had also worked at KTON in Belton. Reynolds was the station's first music director and Jones was the original engineer.

KOOV continued to be a highly rated local station through most of the 1990s, but as the decade moved along, its ratings began to fall. Waco country station WACO-FM 99.9 moved its tower to Moody, increasing its signal in the Copperas Cove area and posing a formidable threat. By the end of the decade, WACO had greatly cut into KOOV's ratings.

=== KSSM ===
In 2000, Cumulus Media purchased KOOV and sister station KOOC in Belton. Most of the staff was released, new programmers were brought in, and the station was relaunched as adult R&B station KSSM "103.1 Kiss-FM". Cumulus subsequently sold KSSM and its sister stations to Townsquare Media in July 2012. The sole Urban station for years serving the market was KIIZ-FM until 2000 when KSSM launched its current format as an Urban AC station. In November 2017, KSSM rebranded as "My Kiss 103.1" while maintaining its current format. KSSM carried the syndicated Tom Joyner Morning Show in the morning drive time until March 2018, when his show was replaced by The Steve Harvey Morning Show. It also carries Michael Baisden in the afternoon and the Keith Sweat Hotel.
