= KOOV =

KOOV may refer to:

- KOOV (FM), a radio station (106.9 FM) licensed to serve Kempner, Texas, United States
- KSSM, a radio station (103.1 FM) licensed to serve Copperas Cove, Texas, which held the call sign KOOV from 1977 to 2000
- Katrin Koov
