= KWKT-TV =

Television station in Waco, Texas

- Waco–Killeen–Temple, Texas; United States
- City: Waco, Texas
- Channels: Digital: 28 (UHF); Virtual: 44
- Branding: Fox 44 Central Texas; Fox 44 News

Programming
- Affiliations: 44.1: Fox; 44.2: Independent with MyNetworkTV; for others, see § Subchannels

Ownership
- Owner: Nexstar Media Group; (Nexstar Media Inc.)
- Sister stations: KYLE-TV; Tegna: KCEN-TV

History
- First air date: March 13, 1988
- Former call signs: KWKT (1988–2009)
- Former channel numbers: Analog: 44 (UHF, 1988–2009); Digital: 57 (UHF, 2006–2009), 44 (UHF, 2009–2020)
- Former affiliations: Both secondary: The WB (2003–2006); MyNetworkTV (2006–2015)
- Call sign meaning: Waco, Killeen, Temple

Technical information
- Licensing authority: FCC
- Facility ID: 12522
- ERP: 244 kW
- HAAT: 557.6 m (1,829 ft)
- Transmitter coordinates: 31°18′53.6″N 97°19′37.1″W
- Translator(s): KYLE-DT 28.2 (UHF) Bryan

Links
- Public license information: Public file; LMS
- Website: www.fox44news.com

KWKT-TV (channel 44) is a television station in Waco, Texas, United States, serving as the Fox affiliate for Central Texas. It is owned by Nexstar Media Group alongside Bryan-licensed KYLE-TV (channel 28), an independent station with MyNetworkTV; Nexstar's Tegna subsidiary owns Temple-licensed KCEN-TV (channel 6), an NBC affiliate. KWKT-TV and KYLE-TV share studios on Woodway Drive in the Waco suburb of Woodway; KWKT-TV's transmitter is located near Moody, Texas.

== History ==
The station first signed on the air on March 13, 1988, and has been affiliated with Fox since the station's launch. Beginning with the launch of the block in 1990, KWKT aired Fox Kids programming one hour earlier than many affiliates on weekday afternoons from 1 to 4 p.m. until the weekday block was discontinued by the network in December 2001, in addition to carrying its successor Saturday morning children's blocks known as Fox Box and later 4KidsTV until the latter block ended nationally in December 2008, when 4Kids Entertainment and Fox parted ways due to a contract dispute.

The station was purchased by Lafayette, Louisiana-based Communications Corporation of America in 1990. KWKT-TV's signal was unable to reach across central Texas because of interference issues experienced by UHF stations operating in rugged terrain; as a result, Comcorp purchased KYLE-TV (channel 28) in Bryan, at that time a WB affiliate, in 1996 and, after it was granted a satellite waiver by the Federal Communications Commission (FCC), converted it to a satellite station in order to provide Fox programming to the entire market.

In July 2002, KWKT became a secondary affiliate of The WB; with this, that network's primetime schedule aired on KWKT/KYLE on a six-hour delay from 1 to 3 a.m., with Fox network programming running in pattern from 7 to 9 p.m. At this time, the station also added The WB's children's program block Kids' WB in the time slot formerly occupied by Fox Kids—which KWKT/KYLE replaced with syndicated programs following the discontinuance of the Fox Kids weekday block, lasting until Kids' WB's weekday block was replaced in January 2006 by the Daytime WB rerun block; the station also carried the block's Saturday morning lineup airing a day behind on Sunday mornings.

On February 22, 2006, News Corporation announced the launch of a new programming service called MyNetworkTV, which would be operated by the Fox network's sister companies Fox Television Stations and Twentieth Television. MyNetworkTV was created to compete against another upstart network that would launch at the same time that September, The CW (an amalgamated network that originally consisted primarily of The WB and UPN's higher-rated programs) as well as to give UPN and WB stations that were not named as CW charter affiliates another option besides converting to independent stations. When MyNetworkTV launched on September 5, 2006, the station carried the programming service as a secondary affiliation from 10 p.m. to midnight each weeknight. As the block became part of The CW's programming schedule with that network's launch on September 18, Kids' WB programming moved to a CW-affiliated digital subchannel of CBS affiliate KWTX-TV (channel 10).

On April 24, 2013, Communications Corporation of America announced the sale of its stations to Irving-based Nexstar Broadcasting Group for $270 million, in a deal that also included rights to the local marketing agreements involving stations owned by Comcorp partner company White Knight Broadcasting. However, due to a later proposal by the FCC to restrict sharing agreements between two or more television stations within the same market, approval of the sale was delayed for 20 months—at which time Nexstar sold some of KWKT/KYLE's sister stations under Comcorp ownership to licensees run by female and ethnic minority owners (all but one of which would end up operated by Nexstar through outsourcing agreements)—before finally being completed on January 1, 2015. The sale was completed on January 1, 2015.

On May 7, 2015, Nexstar announced that it would convert KYLE into a separate station that would serve as the market's MyNetworkTV affiliate. After becoming the market's sole Fox affiliate on July 1, KWKT replaced the time period previously occupied by MyNetworkTV programming with syndicated programs; it also began simulcasting KYLE on its second digital subchannel to provide its programming to the entire Waco–Temple–Bryan market. KWKT is simulcast on KYLE's second subchannel for the same reason.

== Programming ==
Prior to the conversion of KYLE into a standalone station, KWKT aired MyNetworkTV programming on a three-hour delay from 10 p.m. to midnight; the MyNetworkTV schedule began airing in pattern from 7 to 9 p.m. after KYLE became a primary MyNetworkTV affiliate on July 1, 2015.

Through Fox's primary rights to the National Football Conference (NFC), the station carries select Sunday afternoon National Football League games involving the Dallas Cowboys, as well as any flex-scheduled games involving the Houston Texans (which play in the American Football Conference) at times when either team plays a home game against an NFC opponent that airs in a Sunday afternoon timeslot.

=== News operation ===
As of April 2021, KWKT-TV broadcasts 12 hours of locally produced newscasts each week (with two hours each weekday and one hour each on Saturdays and Sundays).

==== News programming history ====
On January 28, 2008, KWKT premiered a half-hour prime time newscast at 9 p.m. titled Fox News Central Texas. The pre-taped newscast was produced by NBC-affiliated sister station KETK-TV in Longview, Texas; similar to other outsourced newscasts by its sister Fox stations in Texas and Louisiana under Comcorp ownership, the program featured stories filed by reporters based in the Waco–Temple–Bryan area, with a local forecast segment compiled and presented by KETK's evening meteorologists. The program's debut broadcast was delayed by a half-hour due to Fox's coverage of that year's State of the Union address, before moving to its regular timeslot on January 29.

On April 27, 2009, as part of cost-cutting measures mandated by Comcorp, the program was reduced to a six-minute broadcast; KWKT also added 30-second hourly updates (known as "news blasts") interspersed within syndicated and network programming. The changes resulted in the layoffs of five employees, all of whom worked as reporters or assignment editors. On September 20, 2010, it was expanded to a half-hour and was retitled to Fox 44 News at Nine.

On May 8, 2015, Nexstar Broadcasting Group announced plans to expand local news programming on KWKT-TV in early 2016. KWKT transferred production of its newscasts to Waco when it launched its news department on July 8, 2017, coinciding with its expansion of the Saturday editions of its 9 p.m. newscast to one hour; this was followed by the debut of a half-hour 5:30 p.m. newscast—which airs only on Monday through Friday evenings—on July 10. The station's initial anchor team includes Robert Burns (who previously served as a reporter at fellow Fox affiliate KSWB-TV and hosted The Burns Report podcast for XEPRS-AM in San Diego) and Leslie Rangel (who previously worked as a reporter at NBC affiliate and KSWB sister station, KFOR-TV in Oklahoma City) as weeknight anchors, and Renee Summerour (formerly an anchor and multimedia journalist at NBC affiliate KYMA-TV in Yuma, Arizona) anchoring the weekend edition of the 9 p.m. newscast.

Subsequently, on July 17, KWKT launched a two-hour-long simulcast of the weekday morning news program aired by CW-affiliated sister station KNVA in Austin (which was produced by NBC-affiliated sister KXAN-TV in that market) from 7 to 9 a.m., under the title Fox 44 Capital News; the simulcast replaced religious programming in that time period, some of which were shifted to lead into the program. The KNVA simulcast was discontinued after the August 24, 2018, broadcast as a consequence of KXAN's decision to cancel the extension of its weekday morning newscast due to insufficient viewership. (KWKT replaced the KNVA news simulcast with syndicated educational children's programs and infomercials in the timeslot.)

== Technical information ==
=== Subchannels ===
The station's signal is multiplexed:

Subchannels of KWKT-TV
Subchannel	Res.	Short name	Programming
44.1	720p	KWKT-DT	Fox
44.2	720p	MyNet	KYLE-TV (Independent with MyNetworkTV)
44.3	480i	Antenna	Antenna TV
44.4	480i	Bounce	Bounce TV

Simulcast of subchannels of another station

=== Analog-to-digital conversion ===
KWKT-TV shut down its analog signal, over UHF channel 44, on June 12, 2009, the official date on which full-power television stations in the United States transitioned from analog to digital broadcasts under federal mandate. The station relocated its digital signal from its pre-transition UHF channel 57, which was among the high band UHF channels (52-69) that were removed from broadcasting use as a result of the transition, to its analog-era UHF channel 44 for post-transition operations.
