= KHLE =

KHLE may refer to:

- KHSB-FM, a radio station (104.7 FM) licensed to serve Kingsland, Texas, United States, which held the call sign KHLE from 2015 to 2016
- KOOV (FM), a radio station (106.9 FM) licensed to serve Kempner, Texas, which held the call sign KHLE from 2005 to 2013
