= KAGS =

KAGS may refer to:

- KAGS-LD, a low-power television station (channel 23) licensed to Bryan, Texas, United States
- Augusta Regional Airport (ICAO code KAGS)
