= KAGS-LD =

Television station in Bryan, Texas

Semi-satellite of KCEN-TV, Temple, Texas
- Bryan–College Station, Texas; United States
- City: Bryan, Texas
- Channels: Digital: 23 (UHF); Virtual: 23
- Branding: KAGS (pronounced K-Ags)

Programming
- Affiliations: 23.1: NBC; for others, see § Subchannels

Ownership
- Owner: Tegna Inc., a subsidiary of Nexstar Media Group; (LSB Broadcasting, Inc.)
- Sister stations: KCEN-TV; Nexstar: KWKT, KYLE-TV

History
- Founded: March 16, 1988
- First air date: May 31, 1988
- Former call signs: K63DL (1988–2003); KMAY-LP (2003–2009); KMAY-LD (2009–2011)
- Former channel numbers: Analog: 63 (UHF, 1988–2003), 23 (UHF, 2003–2009)
- Call sign meaning: Aggies (Texas A&M Aggies)

Technical information
- Licensing authority: FCC
- Facility ID: 10246
- Class: LD
- ERP: 2.1 kW
- HAAT: 195.8 m (642 ft)
- Transmitter coordinates: 30°41′16.2″N 96°25′32.4″W

Links
- Public license information: LMS
- Website: www.kagstv.com

KAGS-LD (channel 23) is a low-power television station licensed to Bryan, Texas, United States, serving the Brazos Valley as an affiliate of NBC. The station is owned by the Tegna subsidiary of Nexstar Media Group and maintains studios on South Texas Avenue in Bryan and a transmitter on North Harvey Mitchell Parkway west of the city.

Although identifying as a separate station in its own right, KAGS-LD is considered a semi-satellite of Temple-licensed KCEN-TV (channel 6). As such, it simulcasts all network and syndicated programming as provided through its parent station but airs separate local newscasts, commercial inserts and legal identifications, and has its own website. KAGS-LD serves the eastern half of the Waco–Temple–Bryan market while KCEN-TV serves the western portion. The two stations are counted as a single unit for ratings purposes. Although KAGS-LD maintains its own facilities, master control and some internal operations are based at KCEN-TV's studios on North 3rd Street in downtown Temple. KAGS-LD is also a sister station to KWKT-TV (channel 44), a Fox affiliate, and KYLE-TV (channel 28), an independent station with MyNetworkTV.

== History ==
The station debuted on January 20, 2003, as KMAY-LP. The call letters were selected in honor of Frank W. Mayborn, who had founded KCEN in 1953. Previously, KCEN had operated a low-power translator in the Brazos Valley on channel 63 for many years. Like its predecessor, KMAY was a straight simulcast of KCEN, with no local programming; it was only mentioned during KCEN's legal IDs. It was upgraded to digital as KMAY-LD in 2009 and shortly afterward was sold to London Broadcasting along with KCEN.

In July 2011, then-owner London Broadcasting announced that KMAY would relaunch in the fall as KAGS, a locally focused NBC affiliate for the Brazos Valley. The station had changed its calls to KAGS-LD in May, but continued to operate under the KMAY calls until October. Newscasts are broadcast in high definition on virtual sets created with chroma key technology. On its first day as a locally focused station, it replaced KCEN on most Brazos Valley cable systems. In 2013, KAGS rolled out its first full-fledged website. Since its 2011 relaunch, its website had been a section of KCEN's website.

KAGS-LD was included in Gannett Company's purchase of parent station KCEN-TV and several other London Broadcasting stations, which was completed on July 8, 2014.

On June 29, 2015, the Gannett Company split in two, with one side specializing in print media and the other side specializing in broadcast and digital media. KAGS was retained by the latter company, named Tegna. Nexstar Media Group acquired Tegna in a deal announced in August 2025 and completed in March 2026.

== News operation ==
In October 2011, the station launched its local news operations. It was the second full-fledged newscast airing at that time in the Brazos Valley, after CBS affiliate KBTX-TV (channel 3). ABC affiliate KRHD-CD, a semi-satellite of KXXV (channel 25), aired pre-taped newscasts until 2015 and later resumed an independent news operation in September 2020.

On March 23, 2015, KAGS, along with sister station KCEN, launched the Gannett group's graphical theme as part of their rollout to the ex-London stations.

=== Notable former on-air staff ===
- Steven Romo – anchor, 2011–2013

== Subchannels ==
The station's signal is multiplexed:

Subchannels of KAGS-LD
Subchannel	Res.	Short name	Programming
23.1	1080i	KAGS	NBC
23.2	720p	Quest	Quest / Dallas Mavericks games
23.3	480i	Crime	True Crime Network
23.4	480i	NOSEY	(Blank)
23.5	480i	COMET	Comet
