= Moody High School =

Coordinates: 31.2861°N 97.3686°W

Location
- 11862 S Lonestar Pkwy. Moody, Texas 76557-0448; United States

Information
- School type: Public high school
- School district: Moody Independent School District
- Principal: Daniel Arlitt
- Teaching staff: 22.83 (FTE)
- Grades: 9-12
- Enrollment: 215 (2023–2024)
- Student to teacher ratio: 9.42
- Colors: Green and Gold
- Athletics conference: UIL Class AA
- Mascot: Bearcat/Lady Bearcat
- Website: Moody High School

Moody High School is a public high school located on the south edge of Moody, Texas, USA and classified as a 2A school by the UIL. It is part of the Moody Independent School District located in southwestern McLennan County and extends into portions of Coryell County and Bell County, Texas. In 2015, the school was rated "Met Standard" by the Texas Education Agency.

== Athletics ==
The Moody Bearcats compete in these sports -

Cross Country, Volleyball, Football, Powerlifting, Basketball, Golf, Tennis, Track, Softball & Baseball

=== State Titles ===
- Boys Track
  - 1975(B)
