= KLTD =

- Temple, Texas; United States
- Broadcast area: Killeen-Temple area
- Frequency: 101.7 MHz
- Branding: 101.7 Jack FM

Programming
- Language: English
- Format: Adult hits
- Affiliations: Jack FM

Ownership
- Owner: Townsquare Media; (Townsquare Media Killeen-Temple License, LLC)
- Sister stations: KOOC, KSSM, KTEM, KUSJ

History
- First air date: May 31, 1976

Technical information
- Licensing authority: FCC
- Facility ID: 53647
- Class: C3
- ERP: 16,500 watts
- HAAT: 125 meters (410 ft)
- Transmitter coordinates: 31°16′24″N 97°23′31″W

Links
- Public license information: Public file; LMS
- Webcast: Listen Live
- Website: 1017jackfm.com

KLTD (101.7 MHz), branded as "101.7 Jack FM", is a commercial FM radio station licensed to Killeen, Texas and serving the Killeen-Temple radio market. It airs an adult hits radio format and is owned by Townsquare Media. The station's studios are located in Temple, and its transmitter is located south of Moody, Texas.

The station was an affiliate of the Dallas Cowboys Radio Network. Monday through Saturday mornings, KLTD previously carried the syndicated "Walton & Johnson Show" from Houston. On weekends, it carried the "Top Rock Countdown" with Sammy Hagar.

== History ==
KLTD went on the air on May 31, 1976, and was licensed to The Lampasas Broadcasting Company owned by Stephen Sampson. The station was branded as "The Great Ones". Group & Broadcasting of Tulsa acquired KLTD in mid 1977.

On October 1, 2010, KLTD changed its format from mainstream rock (as "Eagle 101.7") to sports, branded as "The Ticket".

On March 15, 2013 at 5 PM, the station began stunting as "The Bone" with "music for dogs". The stunt lasted until the following Monday, when a new permanent format debuted as classic hits, branded as "K101.7".

On June 23, 2017, KLTD shifted its format from classic hits to classic rock, branded as "K-Rock 101.7".

On May 17, 2021, KLTD changed its format from classic rock to Regional Mexican, branded as "La Grande 101.7".

In late June 2022, KLTD changed its format from Regional Mexican to Spanish adult hits, branded as "Juan 101.7".

On October 1, 2026, KLTD changed their format from Spanish adult hits to English adult hits, branded as "101.7 Jack FM".

== Previous logos ==
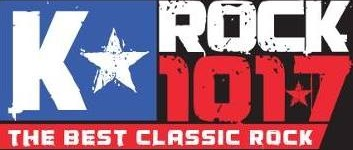
