= Pete Sousa =

American sportscaster

- Born: Peter Martin Sousa; Bryn Mawr, Pennsylvania
- Education: University of Richmond
- Occupation: Sports broadcaster / Live show host
- Years active: 2009-present
- Spouse: Kristy Hundt (married 2026-present)
- Children: 2
Sports broadcast career
- Genre: Play-by-play
- Sports: NCAA football; NCAA basketball; NCAA baseball; NCAA softball; NCAA volleyball
- Employer: ESPN (2022–present); Big 12 (2024–present); NBCUniversal (2025–present)
Radio personality and podcast career
- Genre: Sports commentary; Sobriety
- Shows: Pete Sousa Show (2022–present); The Payoff with Pete (2021–present)
- Employers: Rogue Media Network (2021–present); Westwood One (2026–present)

Peter Martin Sousa (born February 5, 1977) is a three-time AP award-winning American sportscaster and serves as a play-by-play announcer for ESPN and NBCUniversal and a studio host for the Big 12 Conference. Additionally, Sousa is a live show host for the Pete Sousa Show and appears daily as co-host of the Drake Toll show on the Westwood One radio network.

== Early life and education ==
Sousa was born in Bryn Mawr, Pennsylvania, and attended Catholic secondary school, Archbishop John Carroll High School. There, he played basketball and played as a defensive end in football. He was recruited and given a full scholarship to play football at the University of Richmond, but was diagnosed with hypertrophic cardiomyopathy, preventing him from playing. The coaches still honored his scholarship, allowing him to continue his studies while working with the team. The diagnosis came after a doctor insisted Sousa see a cardiologist before being cleared to play. In an interview with the WACOAN, a monthly magazine based in Waco, Texas, Sousa described the referral as "a godsend". Sousa graduated from Richmond in 1999 with a Bachelor's in Communication.

== Sports broadcasting career ==
After graduating from the University of Richmond, Sousa moved to New York, New York, where he worked at SFX Sports, the sports division of SFX Entertainment, in athlete representation, along with a football scouting firm.

Soon after, he worked in public relations at USA Basketball in Colorado Springs, Colorado, leading him to then work NBA public relations roles with the Charlotte Hornets and the Philadelphia 76ers for almost a decade.

From 2012 to 2015, Sousa worked with the NBA Development League, where he served as a play-by-play broadcaster and TV show host for the NBA D-League affiliate of the Brooklyn Nets, Springfield Armor's show, Inside the Armor. He also covered the NBA Draft and host the NBA D-League draft for NBA Entertainment.

In 2014, he moved to Charlotte, North Carolina, where he worked as a sideline reporter for the Charlotte Hornets' radio broadcasts and as a pregame host for the team's digital network.

During the COVID-19 pandemic in 2020, Sousa worked as a play-by-play broadcaster for Texas public high school football teams, and called five games that year. This helped him find work with Baylor University's softball and women's basketball teams, where he also called games.

Sousa currently works as a play-by-play announcer for ESPN, calling college football, basketball, softball, and baseball games. He also serves as a host for the Big 12 Conference's Inside the 12 show.

== News anchor career ==
=== KNOE-TV ===
In 2015, Sousa moved to Monroe, Louisiana, where he worked as a news anchor for KNOE-TV's morning broadcast, Good Morning ArkLaMiss. He also anchored the noon news, covering topics like gun violence at churches, teen drug abuse, and hoarding. Sousa contributed to Emmy-nominated coverage of the 2016 historic flooding in Northeast Louisiana.

=== KWTX-TV ===
Sousa moved to Waco, Texas in 2017, where he continued work as a news anchor for KWTX-TV. He served as the host of KWTX-TV's Be Remarkable segment, where he highlighted people "who go above and beyond to positively impact the lives of others." Sousa worked with KWTX's Foster Care Project, where he highlighted children in need of a home.

== Radio personality career ==
In 2021, Sousa created a podcast, The Payoff with Pete Sousa, where he discusses sobriety and overcoming addiction with guest speakers, some of whom include former NFL, NBA, and MLB players. A year later, in 2022, he started the Pete Sousa Show, blending sports talk with his own life experiences. Some of his guests include former Villanova basketball Jay Wright, New York Times best-selling author Jeff Pearlman, and former WNBA player and coach Nancy Lieberman.

== Awards and honors ==
In 2017, while working at KNOE-TV, Sousa received a second-place award in the 2016 Mississippi-Louisiana Associated Press Broadcasters and Media Editors Television Division II Best Franchise Reporting category, alongside co-anchors Lacey Sharp and Chris Brown for the segment, "8 Ways to Care".

After joining KWTX-TV, Sousa and his co-anchor, Taina Maya, won first place in the 2018 Texas Associated Press Broadcasters Television II Morning Newscast category. Sousa and KWTX-TV subsequently received the same award a year later in 2019.

== Sobriety ==
After more than a decade of alcohol and drug addiction, Sousa reached what he called the "gift of desperation" and entered a rehabilitation center in 2011. After 30 days of treatment, he spent four months in a halfway house, working at KFC, which he noted, gave him "confidence and humility." His sobriety date is November 7 2011.
