= KMAY =

KMAY may refer to:

- KMAY-LP, a low-power radio station (102.5 FM) licensed to serve York, Nebraska, United States
- KAGS-LD, a low-power television station (channel 23) licensed to serve Bryan, Texas, United States, which held the call sign KMAY-LP or KMAY-LD from 2003 to 2011
