= Killeen, Texas =

- City
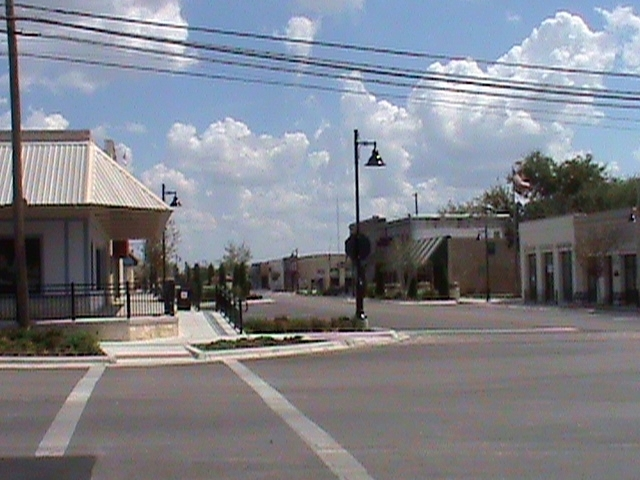
- Avenue D in downtown Killeen

- Flag
- Motto(s): "Dedicated Service - Every Day, for Everyone"
- Location of Killeen, Texas

- Location in Texas Location in the United States
- Coordinates: 31°06′20″N 97°43′36″W
- Country: United States
- State: Texas
- County: Bell

Government
  - Type: Council-Manager
  - Mayor: Joseph Solomon
  - Mayor Pro Tem: Jessica Gonzalez
  - City Council: Charles F. Kimble; David Bass; Anthony Kendrick; Debbie Nash-King; Mellisa Brown; Beverly Ann Williams

Area
  - City: 55.50 sq mi (143.75 km^{2})
  - Land: 54.85 sq mi (142.06 km^{2})
  - Water: 0.65 sq mi (1.69 km^{2})
- Elevation: 863 ft (263 m)

Population (2020)
  - City: 153,095
  - Density: 2,765.1/sq mi (1,067.63/km^{2})
  - Urban: 257,222 (US: 157th)
  - Urban density: 2,561.4/sq mi (989.0/km^{2})
  - Metro: 475,367 (US: 115th)
- Time zone: UTC−6 (Central (CST))
  - Summer (DST): UTC−5 (CDT)
- ZIP codes: 76540, 76541, 76542, 76543, 76548, 76549
- Area code: 254
- FIPS code: 48-39148
- GNIS feature ID: 2411542
- Website: www.killeentexas.gov

Killeen is a city in the U.S. state of Texas, located in Bell County. According to the 2020 census, its population was 153,095, making it the 19th-most populous city in Texas and the largest of the three principal cities of Bell County. It is the principal city of the Killeen–Temple–Fort Hood Metropolitan Statistical Area. Killeen is 68 miles (109 km) north of Austin, 125 miles (201 km) southwest of Dallas, and 125 miles (201 km) northeast of San Antonio.

Killeen is directly adjacent to the main cantonment of Fort Hood. Its economy depends on the activities of the post, and the soldiers and their families stationed there. It is known as a military "boom town" because of its rapid growth and high influx of soldiers.

== History ==
In 1881, the Gulf, Colorado and Santa Fe Railway extended its tracks through central Texas, buying 360 acres (1.5 km^{2}) a few miles southwest of a small farming community known as Palo Alto, which had existed since about 1872. The railroad platted a 70-block town on its land and named it after Frank P. Killeen, the assistant general manager of the railroad. By the next year, the town included a railroad depot, a saloon, several stores, and a school. Many of the residents of the surrounding smaller communities in the area moved to Killeen. By 1884, the town had grown to include about 350 people, served by five general stores, two gristmills, two cotton gins, two saloons, a lumberyard, a blacksmith shop, and a hotel.

Killeen expanded as it became an important shipping point for cotton, wool, and grain in western Bell and eastern Coryell Counties. By 1900, its population was about 780.

Around 1905, local politicians and businessmen convinced the Texas legislature to build bridges over Cowhouse Creek and other streams, doubling Killeen's trade area. A public water system began operation in 1914 and its population had increased to 1,300 residents.

Until the 1940s, Killeen remained a relatively small and isolated farm trade center. The buildup associated with World War II changed that dramatically. In 1942, Camp Hood (recommissioned as Fort Hood in 1950) was created as a military training post to meet war demands. Laborers, construction workers, contractors, soldiers, and their families moved into the area by the thousands, and Killeen became a military boomtown. The opening of Camp Hood radically altered the nature of the local economy, since the sprawling new military post covered almost half of Killeen's farming trade area.

The loss of more than 300 farms and ranches led to the demise of Killeen's cotton gins and other farm-related businesses. New businesses were started to provide services for the military camp. Killeen then suffered a recession when Camp Hood was all but abandoned after the end of World War II, but when Southern congressmen got it established in 1950 as a permanent army post, the city boomed again. Its population increased from about 1,300 in 1949 to 7,045 in 1950, and between 1950 and 1951, about 100 new commercial buildings were constructed in Killeen.

In addition to shaping local economic development after 1950, the military presence at Fort Hood also changed the city's racial, religious, and ethnic composition. No blacks lived in the city in 1950, for example. By the early 1950s, Marlboro Heights, an all-black subdivision, had been developed. In 1956, the city school board voted to integrate the local high school. The city's first resident Catholic priest, Father Francis Weber was assigned to the St. Joseph's parish in 1954, and around the same time, new Presbyterian and Episcopal churches were built.

By 1955, Killeen had an estimated 21,076 residents and 224 businesses. Troop cutbacks and transfers in the mid-1950s led to another recession in Killeen, which lasted until 1959, when various divisions were reassigned to Fort Hood. The town continued to grow through the 1960s, especially after US involvement deepened in the Vietnam War and demand for troops kept rising.

By 1970, Killeen had developed into a city of 35,507 inhabitants and had added a municipal airport, a new municipal library, and a junior college (Central Texas College). By 1980, when the census counted 49,307 people in Killeen, it was the largest city in Bell County.

After the Iraqi invasion of Kuwait in the late summer of 1990, the city prepared for war, sending thousands of troops from the 2nd Armored Division and the 1st Cavalry Division to the Middle East.

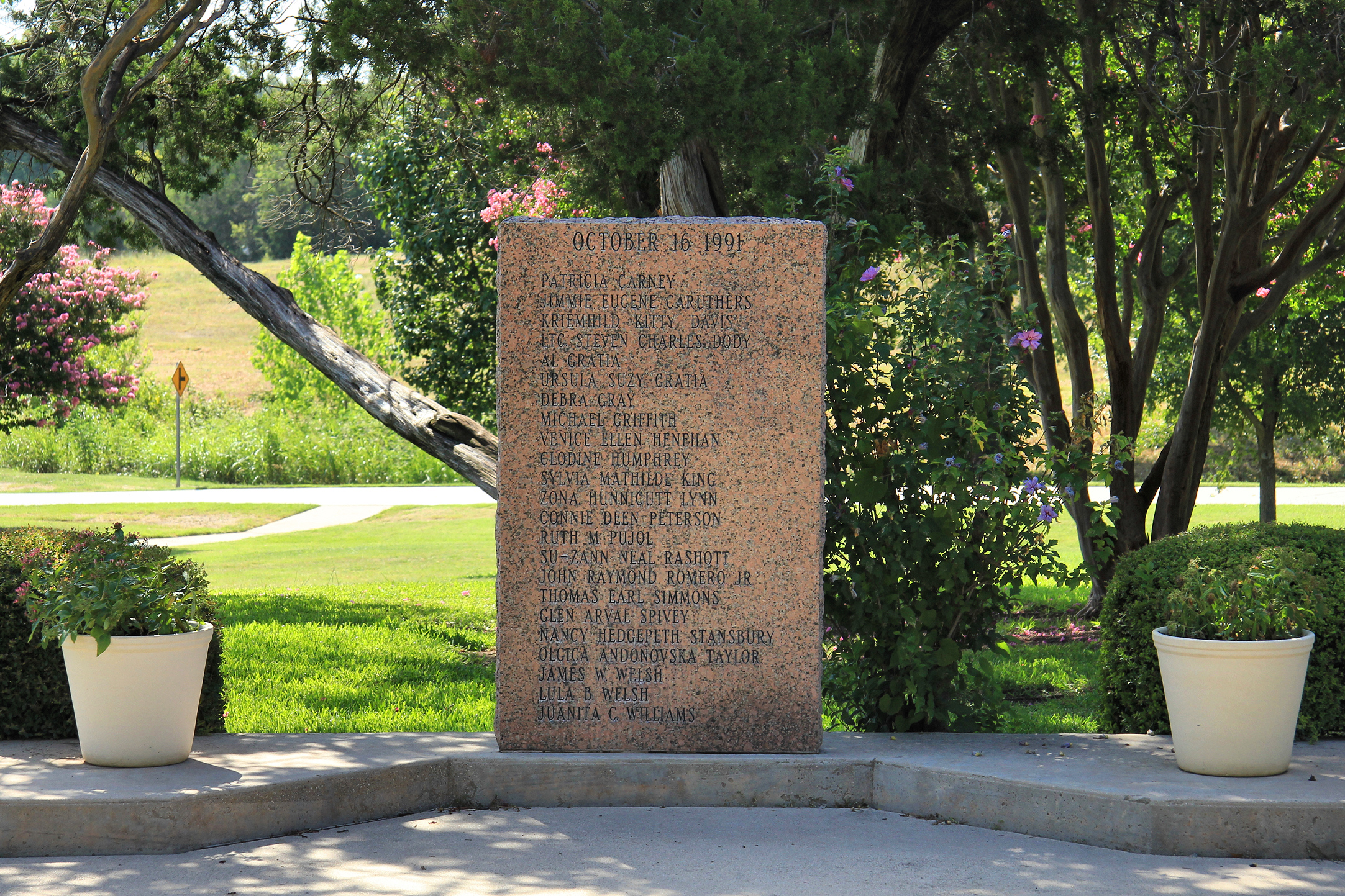
Memorial to those killed in the Luby's Massacre

On October 16, 1991, George Hennard murdered 23 people and then committed suicide at the Luby's Cafeteria in Killeen.

In December 1991, Killeen High School Kangaroos, won the 5-A Division I state football championship by defeating Sugar Land Dulles 14–10 in the Astrodome.

By 2000, the census listed Killeen's population as 86,911, and by 2010, it was over 127,000, making it one of the fastest-growing areas in the nation.

Numerous military personnel from Killeen have served in the wars in Iraq and Afghanistan. As of April 2008, more than 400 of its soldiers had died in the two wars.

On November 5, 2009, only a few miles from the site of the Luby's massacre, a gunman opened fire on people at the Fort Hood military base with a handgun, killing 13 and wounding 32. Major Nidal Hasan, a career officer and psychiatrist, sustained four gunshot wounds after a brief shootout with a civilian police officer. He suffered paralysis from the waist down. He was arrested and convicted by a court-martial, where he was sentenced to death.

In 2011, Killeen got media attention from a new television series called Surprise Homecoming, hosted by Billy Ray Cyrus, about military families who have loved ones returning home from overseas.

On April 2, 2014, a second shooting spree occurred at several locations at Fort Hood. Ivan Lopez, a career soldier, killed three people and wounded 16 others before committing suicide.

In April of 2020, then Army Private First Class Vanessa Guillén was murdered on Fort Hood by fellow soldier Aaron Robinson. He buried her dismembered body near Stillhouse Hollow Lake. Killeen Police as well as Bell County Sheriff's deputies attempted to arrest Robinson in Killeen, but he killed himself before they could do so. The murder of the Houston native gained national attention.

== Geography ==
Killeen is located in western Bell County and is bordered to the north by Fort Hood and to the east by Harker Heights. Killeen is 16 miles (26 km) west of Belton, the county seat and nearest access to Interstate 35.

According to the United States Census Bureau, the city has a total area of 54.2 square miles (140.5 km^{2}), of which 53.6 square miles (138.8 km^{2}) is land and 0.66 square miles (1.7 km^{2}), or 1.24%, is covered by water.

=== Climate ===
According to the Köppen Climate Classification system, Killeen has a humid subtropical climate, abbreviated "Cfa" on climate maps. The hottest temperature recorded in Killeen was 112 °F (44 °C) on September 4, 2000 and September 6, 2000, while the coldest temperature recorded was −2 °F (−19 °C) on December 23–24, 1989.

Climate data for Killeen, Texas, 1991–2020 normals, extremes 1912–present
Month	Jan	Feb	Mar	Apr	May	Jun	Jul	Aug	Sep	Oct	Nov	Dec	Year
Record high °F (°C)	89 (32)	100 (38)	100 (38)	100 (38)	103 (39)	106 (41)	111 (44)	110 (43)	112 (44)	102 (39)	91 (33)	85 (29)	112 (44)
Mean maximum °F (°C)	78.6 (25.9)	82.3 (27.9)	86.7 (30.4)	89.8 (32.1)	93.2 (34.0)	98.4 (36.9)	101.7 (38.7)	102.3 (39.1)	98.7 (37.1)	92.5 (33.6)	84.9 (29.4)	79.2 (26.2)	103.1 (39.5)
Mean daily maximum °F (°C)	59.5 (15.3)	63.1 (17.3)	69.8 (21.0)	77.0 (25.0)	83.8 (28.8)	92.2 (33.4)	95.7 (35.4)	96.6 (35.9)	89.6 (32.0)	79.7 (26.5)	69.4 (20.8)	60.4 (15.8)	78.1 (25.6)
Daily mean °F (°C)	47.8 (8.8)	51.5 (10.8)	58.5 (14.7)	65.3 (18.5)	73.4 (23.0)	81.0 (27.2)	84.0 (28.9)	84.6 (29.2)	78.2 (25.7)	68.0 (20.0)	57.6 (14.2)	49.3 (9.6)	66.6 (19.2)
Mean daily minimum °F (°C)	36.1 (2.3)	39.9 (4.4)	47.1 (8.4)	53.6 (12.0)	63.0 (17.2)	69.7 (20.9)	72.3 (22.4)	72.7 (22.6)	66.7 (19.3)	56.4 (13.6)	45.8 (7.7)	38.1 (3.4)	55.1 (12.9)
Mean minimum °F (°C)	21.8 (−5.7)	26.3 (−3.2)	30.1 (−1.1)	39.7 (4.3)	48.9 (9.4)	61.5 (16.4)	67.1 (19.5)	67.3 (19.6)	54.2 (12.3)	39.1 (3.9)	28.0 (−2.2)	24.3 (−4.3)	19.6 (−6.9)
Record low °F (°C)	−1 (−18)	2 (−17)	15 (−9)	27 (−3)	37 (3)	41 (5)	55 (13)	53 (12)	38 (3)	23 (−5)	17 (−8)	−2 (−19)	−2 (−19)
Average precipitation inches (mm)	2.45 (62)	2.16 (55)	3.27 (83)	2.15 (55)	4.70 (119)	3.21 (82)	2.74 (70)	1.64 (42)	3.89 (99)	3.42 (87)	2.72 (69)	2.40 (61)	34.75 (884)
Average precipitation days (≥ 0.01 in)	7.1	7.3	8.2	6.1	7.4	5.8	3.9	3.9	5.6	6.3	6.4	6.9	74.9
Source: NOAANWSIEM

== Demographics ==
Historical population
Census	Pop.	Note	%±
1890	285		—
1900	780		173.7%
1910	1,265		62.2%
1920	1,208		−4.5%
1930	1,260		4.3%
1940	1,268		0.6%
1950	7,045		455.6%
1960	23,377		231.8%
1970	35,507		51.9%
1980	46,296		30.4%
1990	63,535		37.2%
2000	86,911		36.8%
2010	127,921		47.2%
2020	153,095		19.7%
2023 (est.)	159,643		4.3%
U.S. Decennial Census

=== Racial and ethnic composition ===
Killeen city, Texas – Racial and ethnic composition Note: the US Census treats Hispanic/Latino as an ethnic category. This table excludes Latinos from the racial categories and assigns them to a separate category. Hispanics/Latinos may be of any race.
Race / Ethnicity (NH = Non-Hispanic)	Pop 2000	Pop 2010	Pop 2020	% 2000	% 2010	% 2020
White alone (NH)	34,570	44,233	36,955	39.78%	34.58%	24.14%
Black or African American alone (NH)	28,267	41,301	54,109	32.52%	32.29%	35.34%
Native American or Alaska Native alone (NH)	538	635	577	0.62%	0.50%	0.38%
Asian alone (NH)	3,669	4,835	5,764	4.22%	3.78%	3.76%
Pacific Islander alone (NH)	708	1,614	2,533	0.81%	1.26%	1.65%
Other Race alone (NH)	310	312	1,132	0.36%	0.24%	0.74%
Mixed race or Multiracial (NH)	3,380	5,646	10,600	3.89%	4.41%	6.92%
Hispanic or Latino (any race)	15,469	29,345	41,425	17.80%	22.94%	27.06%
Total	86,911	127,921	153,095	100.00%	100.00%	100.00%

=== 2020 census ===
As of the 2020 census, Killeen had a population of 153,095. The median age was 29.9 years. 29.0% of residents were under the age of 18 and 8.1% of residents were 65 years of age or older. For every 100 females there were 91.7 males, and for every 100 females age 18 and over there were 87.6 males age 18 and over.

99.6% of residents lived in urban areas, while 0.4% lived in rural areas.

There were 56,587 households in Killeen, of which 40.1% had children under the age of 18 living in them. Of all households, 43.2% were married-couple households, 19.3% were households with a male householder and no spouse or partner present, and 31.0% were households with a female householder and no spouse or partner present. About 25.4% of all households were made up of individuals and 5.7% had someone living alone who was 65 years of age or older.

There were 61,886 housing units, of which 8.6% were vacant. The homeowner vacancy rate was 2.0% and the rental vacancy rate was 10.0%.

Racial composition as of the 2020 census
Race	Number	Percent
White	45,999	30.0%
Black or African American	57,055	37.3%
American Indian and Alaska Native	1,453	0.9%
Asian	6,110	4.0%
Native Hawaiian and Other Pacific Islander	2,741	1.8%
Some other race	15,324	10.0%
Two or more races	24,413	15.9%
Hispanic or Latino (of any race)	41,425	27.1%

=== 2010 census ===
Among the Hispanic population in 2010, 16,321 (12.8%) were of Mexican descent, 8,117 (6.3%) were of Puerto Rican descent, with a sizable population of Central Americans at 1,758 (1.4%).

There were 54,840 households, out of which 40.1% had children under the age of 18 living with them, 47.1% were married couples living together, 17.2% had a female householder with no husband present, and 30.8% were non-families. 24.4% of all households were made up of individuals, and 3.6% had someone living alone who was 65 years of age or older. The average household size was 2.66 and the average family size was 3.17.

In the city, the population was spread out, with 33.2% under the age of 20, 38.7% from 20 to 39, 22.8% from 40 to 64, and 5.2% who were 65 years of age or older. The median age was 27 years.

=== 2000 census ===
The median income for a household in the city was $44,370, and the median income for a family was $36,674. The per capita income for the city was $20,095, compared to the national per capita of $39,997. About 11.2% of families and 16.4% of the population were below the poverty line, including 18.5% of those under age 18 and 8.6% of those age 65 or over.

In 2007, Coldwell Banker rated Killeen the most affordable housing market in the United States, with an average cost of $136,725.

== Economy ==
According to the city's 2024 Annual Comprehensive Financial Report, the top employers in the city are:

#	Employer	# of Employees
1	III Corps & Fort Hood	32,000
2	Military Defense Contractors & Others	7,447
3	Killeen Independent School District	6,800
4	Civilian Personnel Office	6,200
5	Central Texas College	1,488
6	City of Killeen	1,173
7	AdventHealth Central Texas	1,000
8	First Community Services	700
9	Texas A&M University–Central Texas	305
10	Killeen Auto	200

Killeen Mall serves as the city's main shopping destination, and one of two regional shopping malls in Bell County.

== Government ==
The adoption of the City Charter in 1949 established the council-manager form of government under which the City of Killeen still operates today. The mayor is the city's chief elected officer. The mayor preside over the city's seven-member city council, which sets all policy. The city elects its mayor and three council members at large, meaning that every registered voter within the city limits may vote for all four positions. The other four council members represent specific districts of the city and are elected by voters living in their districts. Terms for the mayor and all council members are two years, with a three-consecutive-term limitation for each office. The city holds nonpartisan elections each May. The mayor and the at-large council members are elected in even-numbered years, and the four district council members are elected in odd-numbered years.

=== Local government ===
According to the city's 2020 Comprehensive Annual Financial Report, the city's various funds had $187.9 million in revenues, $174.8 million in expenditures, $593.4 million in total assets, $359.3 million in total liabilities, and $94.6 million in cash and investments.

In 2022, city voters approved the decriminalization of possession of misdemeanor amounts of marijuana.

== Education ==
=== Public schools ===
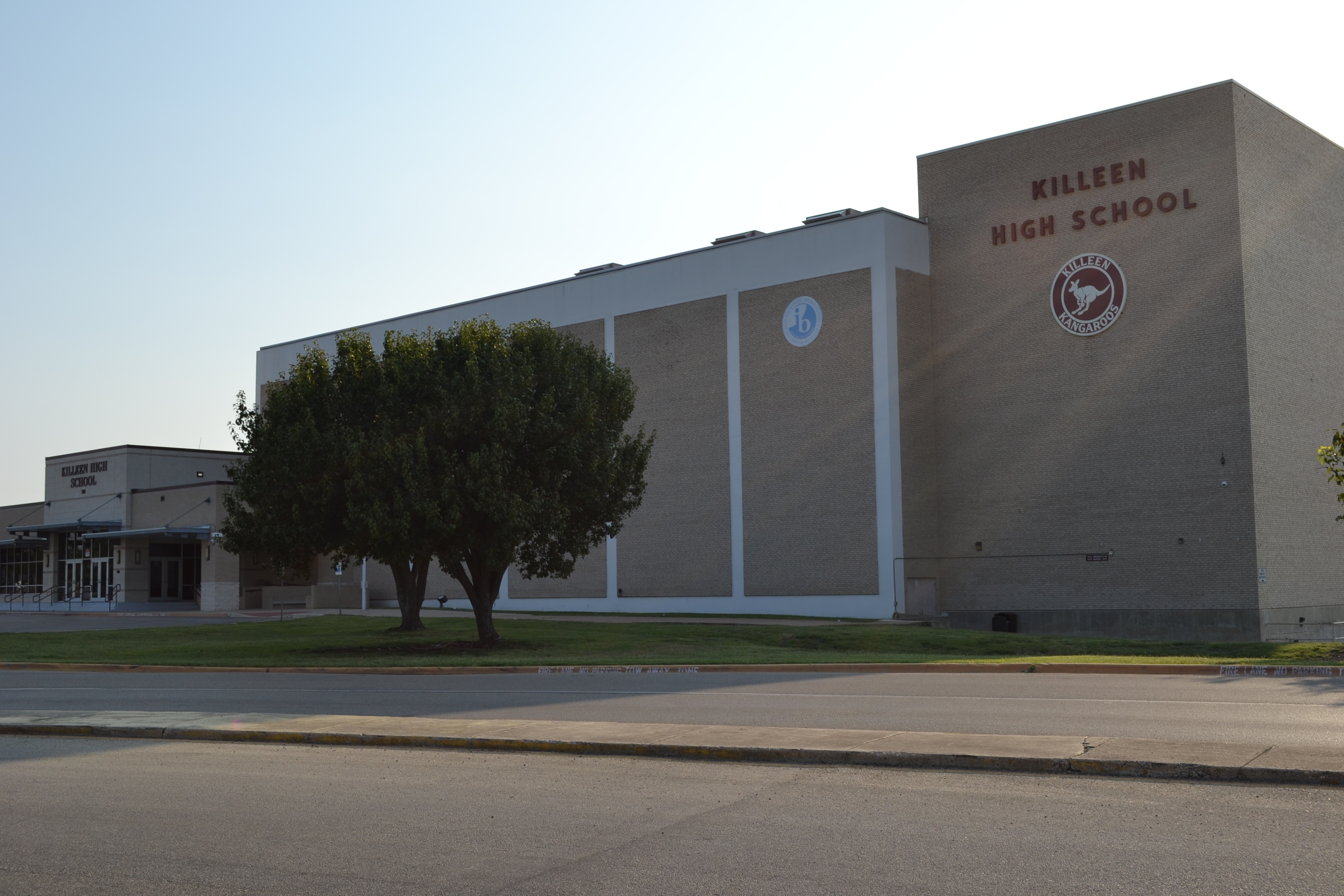
Killeen High School

Almost all of Killeen is within the Killeen Independent School District (KISD). KISD is the largest school district between Round Rock and Dallas, encompassing Killeen, Harker Heights, Fort Hood, Nolanville, and rural west Bell County. KISD has 31 elementary schools (PK–5), 10 middle schools (6–8), 5 high schools (9–12), and 5 specialized campuses. KISD's five high schools and mascots are the Killeen High School Kangaroos (the original citywide high school), the Ellison High School Eagles, the Harker Heights High School Knights, the Shoemaker High School Grey Wolves, the Early College High School Lions, and the Chaparral High School Bobcats.

Small pieces of Killeen extend into the Salado Independent School District.

=== Private schools ===
Memorial Christian Academy (K–12) and Creek View Academy (previously Destiny School), a K–9 charter school of Honors Academy, are in Killeen.

=== Colleges and universities ===
Central Texas College's main campus is partly in Killeen and partly in Copperas Cove. It was established in 1965 to serve Bell, Burnet, Coryell, Hamilton, Lampasas, Llano, Mason, Mills, and San Saba Counties, in addition to Fort Hood. CTC offers more than 40 associate degrees and certificates of completion.

Texas A&M University-Central Texas was established on September 1, 1999, as Tarleton State University-Central Texas. The university currently offers bachelor's and master's degrees.

Areas in Killeen ISD are in the service area of Central Texas College. Areas in Salado ISD are in the service area of Temple College.

== Media ==
Killeen's main newspaper is the Killeen Daily Herald, which has been publishing under different formats since 1890. The paper was one of four owned by the legendary Texas publisher Frank W. Mayborn, whose wife remains its editor and publisher.

The Herald also publishes the Fort Hood Herald, an independent publication in the Fort Hood area, not authorized by Fort Hood Public Affairs, and the Cove Herald, a weekly paper for the residents of Copperas Cove.

The official paper of Fort Hood is The Fort Hood Sentinel, an authorized publication for members of the U.S. Army that is editorially independent of the U.S. government and military.

Television stations include KAKW (Univision O&O), KCEN (NBC), KNCT (The CW), KWTX (CBS/Telemundo), KWKT (Fox), KXXV (ABC), and KAMU (PBS).

Killeen is served by 2 AM radio stations: KTEM and KTON; and 17 FM stations: KBDE, KIIZ, KJHV, KLFX, KLTD, KMYB, KNCT, KOOC, KOOV, KRGN, KRYH, KSSM, KUSJ, KVBM, KVLT, KWTX, and WACO.

NOAA Weather Radio station WXK35 broadcasts weather and hazard information.

Spectrum and Grande Communications provide cable service and DirecTV and Dish Network provide satellite service.

== Infrastructure ==
=== Transportation ===
Killeen is served by a small regional airfield known as Skylark Field (ILE) and the larger Killeen Regional Airport (GRK), the latter with commercial passenger flights.

The Hill Country Transit District (The HOP) operates a public bus transit system within the city with eight routes including connections to Temple, Copperas Cove, and Harker Heights. The HOP buses are easily identified by their teal and purple exteriors. The HOP recently purchased new buses with the new color green. In the metro area's partner city, Temple, there is Amtrak inter-city passenger train service on the Texas Eagle.

Major highways that run through Killeen are Interstate 14/U.S. Highway 190 (Central Texas Expressway or CenTex), Business Loop 190 (Veterans Memorial Boulevard), State Highway 195, and Spur 172 (leading into Fort Hood main gate). Interstate 35 is accessible in Belton, 16 miles (26 km) east of the center of Killeen.

=== Public safety ===
The city of Killeen is protected by two municipal civil service departments: the Killeen Police Department and the Killeen Fire Department.

==== Killeen Police Department ====
The Killeen Police Department has 355 members in its organization with 265 allotted sworn personnel strength. It is responsible for all police functions in Killeen, Texas, covering about 55.235 square miles.

Police Chief Pedro "Pete" Lopez leads the department. Lopez was sworn in on June 5, 2023.

==== Killeen Fire Department ====
The Killeen Fire Department is separated into four separate divisions; Operations, Fire Prevention, Support, and Emergency Management. Currently, the department operates by three 24-hour shifts and provides emergency services from 8 staffed fire stations strategically placed throughout the city. Over two hundred personnel staff 6 Engine Companies, 2 Ladder Companies, 2 Rescue Companies, and 8 Ambulances as well as Technical Rescue and specialty to include Water Rescue, High-Angle Rescue, Wildland Team and Hazardous Materials Team. In addition to the line companies, each shift is staffed with two Battalion Chiefs and two EMS Captains who are supported by three Deputy Chiefs, an Assistant Chief, and Fire Chief.

In 2009, KFD built Station 8 and relocated Fire Station #1 to a new facility on Westcliff Road to provide improved responses in the southeast and northeast areas of the city respectively. With continued growth and expansion, Fire Station #9 was completed in 2017 and provides service the southwest area of town.

== Crime ==
In 2017 Killeen was ranked the 9th most dangerous city in Texas based on crime data. The city's violent crime rate of 766.2 in 2017 was more than double the national rate of 382.9

The number of murders rose from 10 in 2014 to 17 in 2015, an increase of 70%. The number of rapes increased from 114 to 189, an almost 66% increase from the prior year. There were 16 homicides in 2016. There were 22 homicides in Killeen in 2017, the deadliest year on record since 1991.

In 2008, there were 885 violent crimes and 4,757 non-violent crimes reported in the city of Killeen as part of the FBI's Uniform Crime Reports (UCR) Program. Violent crimes are the aggregation of the UCR Part 1 crimes of murder, forcible rape, robbery, and aggravated assault. Non-violent crimes are the aggregation of the crimes of burglary, larceny-theft, and motor vehicle theft.

Killeen's 2008 UCR Part 1 crimes break down as follows:

Crime	Reported offenses	Killeen rate	Texas rate	U.S. rate
Murder	10	8.6	5.6	5.6
Rape	66	56.9	32.9	29.4
Robbery	216	186.4	155.2	154.0
Aggravated assault	593	511.6	314.4	281.6
Violent crime	885	763.5	508.2	470.6
Burglary	1,711	1,476.2	946.5	743.4
Larceny – theft	2,877	2,482.2	2,688.9	2,200.1
Motor vehicle theft	169	145.8	351.1	330.5
Non-violent crime	4,757	4,104.2	3,986.6	3,274.0

Rates are crimes per 100,000 population. The Killeen rates are calculated using the estimated 2008 population figure of 115,906 as provided by the Texas Department of Public Safety.

== Notable people ==
- Brad Buckley, member of the Texas House of Representatives for House District 54
- David Cobb, former NFL running back for the Tennessee Titans
- Lisa Kristine Cummins, American dentist and fashion model
- Mike Dimes, rapper
- Adam Earnheardt, academic and author
- Ta'Quon Graham, NFL player
- Robert Manning Gray, Doolittle Raider
- Michael Hancock, mayor of Denver, Colorado
- Don Hardeman, football running back
- Tommie Harris, football defensive tackle
- Othello Henderson, football defensive tackle
- Oveta Culp Hobby, first Secretary of U.S. Dept. of Health, Education and Welfare
- Cory Jefferson, basketball player
- Shane Kimbrough, NASA astronaut
- Cynthia Lee Fontaine, drag queen
- Royce O'Neale, NBA player
- Mike Stulce, shot putter
- Carl Eugene Watts, serial killer

== Twin towns – sister cities ==
Osan, South Korea, has been Killeen's Sister City since 1995.

Killeen is also twinned with San Juan, Puerto Rico.

== Other sources ==
- Bell County Historical Commission. Story of Bell County, Texas 2 vols. Austin: Eakin Press, 1988.
- Duncan Gra'Delle, Killeen: Tale of Two Cities, 1882–1982. Killeen, Texas: 1984.
