= KBGO =

- Waco, Texas; United States
- Broadcast area: Waco metropolitan area
- Frequency: 95.7 MHz (HD Radio)
- Branding: Big 95

Programming
- Format: Classic hits
- Subchannels: HD2: Urban contemporary "Z95.1"
- Affiliations: Premiere Networks

Ownership
- Owner: iHeartMedia; (iHM Licenses, LLC)
- Sister stations: KBRQ, KIIZ-FM, KLFX, KWTX, KWTX-FM, WACO-FM

History
- First air date: September 9, 1959; 66 years ago (as KEFC at 95.5)
- Former call signs: KEFC (1959-1978); KNFO-FM (1978–1993); KCKR (1993–2003)
- Former frequencies: 95.5 MHz (1959-1998)
- Call sign meaning: K BiG Oldies (former format)

Technical information
- Licensing authority: FCC
- Facility ID: 33724
- Class: C2
- ERP: 24,000 watts
- HAAT: 154 meters (505 ft)
- Transmitter coordinates: 31°30′51″N 97°11′43″W
- Translator: HD2: 95.1 K236BR (Waco)

Links
- Public license information: Public file; LMS
- Webcast: Listen live (via iHeartRadio); Listen live (via iHeartRadio) (HD2)
- Website: kbgo.iheart.com z95live.iheart.com (HD2)

KBGO (95.7 FM) is a commercial radio station in Waco, Texas. It broadcasts a classic hits format, switching to Christmas music for much of November and December. KBGO is owned by iHeartMedia, Inc. It carries two nationally syndicated programs from co-owned Premiere Networks: In middays The Martha Quinn Show and in afternoons Murphy, Sam & Jodi.

KBGO has an effective radiated power (ERP) of 24,000 watts. The studios and transmitter are co-located on Highway 6 near U.S. Route 64 in Waco. KBGO broadcasts using HD Radio technology. The HD2 subchannel airs an urban contemporary format known as "Z95.1" which feeds 92-watt FM translator K236BR at 95.1 MHz.

== History ==
=== KERC ===
The station signed on the air on September 6, 1959. The original call sign was KEFC. The studios and tower were at "The Market Place" strip mall shopping center in the 4700 block of Bosque Boulevard.

KEFC was powered at 3,100 watts, a fraction of its current output. Its tower was short, at 220 feet (67 m). And the station broadcast on 95.5 MHz, a notch down the dial from its current spot. The call letters were taken from the initials of the officers of Music Unlimited, the company which signed the station on (Vice President Charles Koehne, President B.B. English, Vice President John Fulbright and Treasurer James Cook.)

=== Classical, country, rock and gospel ===
KEFC aired a "good music" format consisting of classical, semi-classical and beautiful music until 1969. The station then went through a series of formats: country for three years, then progressive rock, then Top 40, before flipping to Southern gospel music in February 1975.

KEFC was back to a contemporary format by 1977. The call letters were changed to KNFO-FM on February 15, 1978, and the station started branding as "K-95". In 1982, KNFO switched to a country format. On July 26, 1993, the station switched its call letters to KCKR, which lasted ten years. On February 25, 2003, the station flipped to oldies and changed its call sign to the current KBGO.

=== Switch from 95.5 to 95.7 ===
The sign-on signal was basically that of a Class A, even though the channel was eligible for use by bigger class C signals. KEFC Waco was short-spaced with 95.5 KAZZ (now KKMJ) in Austin. In 1985, both 95.5 signals built new sites with powers of 100,000 watts on thousand foot towers. Both stations used directional antennas to protect the other.

By the late 1990s, KKMJ Austin changed to non-directional, allowing coverage of the growing Austin suburbs. KBGO Waco dropped to a Class C2, moved to a tower at the studios in Waco, with 24,000 watts at 470 feet on 95.7. It also returned to a non-directional antenna, although with less range.
