= KOOC =

Coordinates: 31.063°N 97.532°W

- Belton, Texas; United States
- Broadcast area: Killeen-Temple
- Frequency: 106.3 MHz
- Branding: B106

Programming
- Format: Rhythmic contemporary
- Affiliations: Compass Media Networks

Ownership
- Owner: Townsquare Media; (Townsquare Media Killeen-Temple License, LLC)
- Sister stations: KLTD, KSSM, KTEM, KUSJ

History
- First air date: April 25, 1970 (as KTON-FM)
- Former call signs: KTON-FM (1970–1984); KTQN (1984–1990); KYZZ (1990–1991); KOOC (1991–2004); KQXB (4/23/2004-4/30/2004)

Technical information
- Licensing authority: FCC
- Facility ID: 60092
- Class: C3
- ERP: 11,500 watts
- HAAT: 149 meters (489 ft)

Links
- Public license information: Public file; LMS
- Webcast: Listen Live
- Website: myb106.com

KOOC (106.3 FM) is a commercial radio station, licensed to Belton, Texas and serving the Killeen-Temple radio market with a rhythmic contemporary radio format. This station is branded as "B106" under ownership of Townsquare Media, through licensee Townsquare Media Killeen-Temple License, LLC. The station's studios are located in Temple, and its transmitter is located between Belton and Nolanville.

Notable programming includes DeDe In The Morning.
