= Moody Independent School District =

School district in Texas

Moody Independent School District is a public school district based in Moody, Texas (USA).

Located in McLennan County, the district extends into portions of Coryell and Bell counties.

In 2009, the school district was rated "academically acceptable" by the Texas Education Agency.

== Schools ==
- Moody High School (Grades 9-12)
- Moody Middle School (Grades 5–8)
- Moody Elementary School (Grades PK-4)
