= KYLE-TV =

Television station in Bryan, Texas

- Bryan–College Station–; Waco–Temple, Texas; United States
- City: Bryan, Texas
- Channels: Digital: 29 (UHF); Virtual: 28
- Branding: My28 KYLE

Programming
- Affiliations: 28.1: Independent with MyNetworkTV; 28.2: Fox; for others, see § Subchannels

Ownership
- Owner: Nexstar Media Group; (Nexstar Media Inc.)
- Sister stations: KWKT-TV; Tegna: KCEN-TV

History
- First air date: October 31, 1994
- Former call signs: KHFI-TV (CP, 1990–1991); KYLE (1991–2009)
- Former channel numbers: Analog: 28 (UHF, 1994–2009); Digital: 29 (UHF, 2006–2009), 28 (UHF, 2009–2020)
- Former affiliations: Independent (1994–1995); The WB (primary 1995–1996; secondary via KWKT-TV 2002–2006); Fox (via KWKT-TV, 1996–2015); MyNetworkTV (secondary, via KWKT-TV, 2006–2015)
- Call sign meaning: Kyle Field at Texas A&M

Technical information
- Licensing authority: FCC
- Facility ID: 60384
- ERP: 56.7 kW
- HAAT: 209.7 m (688 ft)
- Transmitter coordinates: 30°41′16.2″N 96°25′32.4″W
- Translator(s): KWKT-DT 44.2 (UHF) Waco

Links
- Public license information: Public file; LMS
- Website: www.fox44news.com

KYLE-TV (channel 28) is a television station licensed to Bryan, Texas, United States, serving the Brazos Valley and Central Texas. It is programmed primarily as an independent station, but maintains a secondary affiliation with MyNetworkTV. KYLE-TV is owned by Nexstar Media Group alongside Waco-licensed Fox affiliate KWKT-TV (channel 44); Nexstar's Tegna subsidiary owns Temple-licensed NBC affiliate KCEN-TV (channel 6). KYLE-TV and KWKT-TV share studios on Woodway Drive in the Waco suburb of Woodway, Texas; KYLE-TV operates a secondary studio on Broadmoor Drive in Bryan and transmitter facilities near Farm to Market Road 2818 on the city's western outskirts.

== History ==
=== As a WB affiliate ===
KYLE first signed on the air on October 31, 1994, under the ownership of the Silent Minority Group. Initially an independent station, it affiliated with The WB when the network launched in January 1995. Later that year, the station was put up for sale, as KYLE had lost money every month of its existence.

=== As a primary Fox affiliate ===
Unable to find a buyer that would operate KYLE as a standalone station, in 1996 Silent Minority Group sold the station to the Lafayette, Louisiana–based Communications Corporation of America (ComCorp), after ComCorp was granted a satellite waiver by the Federal Communications Commission (FCC). ComCorp already owned Fox affiliate KWKT, whose signal was unable to reach across central Texas due to signal interference issues experienced by UHF stations operating in areas composed of rugged terrain. Before KYLE's launch, channel 28 had been used for a translator station in College Station, K28AK, that carried KWKT's programming; in most of the market, KWKT was only viewable on cable. Following the purchase, KYLE became a satellite of KWKT, while WB programming moved to a secondary clearance on UPN affiliate KAKW (channel 62). KYLE served the eastern portion of the market, while KWKT served the western portion.

Like its sister station did at the time, KYLE aired Fox Kids programming one hour earlier than many affiliates on weekday afternoons from 1 to 4 p.m. until the weekday block was discontinued by the network in December 2001, in addition to carrying its successor Saturday morning children's blocks known as Fox Box and later 4KidsTV until the latter block ended nationally in December 2008, when 4Kids Entertainment and Fox parted ways due to a contract dispute.

Final KYLE logo as a Fox affiliate, used from 2008 to June 30, 2015.

WB programming returned to KYLE in July 2002, when it and KWKT took on a secondary affiliation with the network; this was The WB's second station change in the market during that year, as its programming had aired on ABC affiliates KXXV (channel 25) and KRHD-LP (channel 34, now channel 40) after KAKW became a Univision station that January. With this, The WB's prime time schedule aired on KWKT/KYLE on a six-hour delay from 1 to 3 a.m., with Fox network programming running in pattern from 7 to 9 p.m. At this time, the station also added The WB's children's program block Kids' WB in the time slot formerly occupied by Fox Kids—which KWKT/KYLE replaced with syndicated programs following the discontinuance of the Fox Kids weekday block, lasting until Kids' WB's weekday block was replaced in January 2006 by the Daytime WB rerun block; the station also carried the block's Saturday morning lineup airing a day behind on Sunday mornings.

On February 22, 2006, News Corporation announced the launch of a new network called MyNetworkTV, which would be operated by the Fox network's sister companies Fox Television Stations and Twentieth Television. MyNetworkTV was created to compete against another upstart network that would launch at the same time that September, The CW (an amalgamated network that originally consisted primarily of The WB and UPN's higher-rated programs) as well as to give UPN and WB stations that were not named as CW charter affiliates another option besides converting to independent stations. When MyNetworkTV launched on September 5, 2006, the station carried the programming service as a secondary affiliation from 10 p.m. to midnight each weeknight. As the block became part of The CW's programming schedule with that network's launch on September 18, Kids' WB programming moved to a CW-affiliated digital subchannel of CBS affiliate KWTX-TV (channel 10).

On April 24, 2013, Communications Corporation of America announced the sale of its stations to Irving-based Nexstar Broadcasting Group for $270 million, in a deal that also included rights to the local marketing agreements involving stations owned by Comcorp partner company White Knight Broadcasting. However, due to a later proposal by the FCC to restrict sharing agreements between two or more television stations within the same market, approval of the sale was delayed for 20 months—at which time Nexstar sold some of KWKT/KYLE's sister stations under Comcorp ownership to licensees run by female and ethnic minority owners (all but one of which would end up operated by Nexstar through outsourcing agreements)—before finally being completed on January 1, 2015. The sale was completed on January 1, 2015.

=== As a MyNetworkTV affiliate ===
On May 7, 2015, Nexstar announced that it would convert KYLE into a separate station that would serve as the market's MyNetworkTV affiliate, with its own inventory of syndicated programming outside of the programming service's broadcast hours. When the conversion took effect on July 1, KYLE changed its on-air branding to "Y28", using a logo based on that originated in 2010 on sister station (and fellow MyNetworkTV affiliate) KARZ-TV in Little Rock, Arkansas (which has since been used by some of its sister MyNetworkTV affiliates and independent stations, including WCIX in Springfield, Illinois, and KOZL-TV in Springfield, Missouri). KWKT became the market's sole Fox affiliate; it also began simulcasting KYLE on its second digital subchannel to provide its programming to the entire Waco–Temple–Bryan market. KWKT is simulcast on KYLE's second subchannel for the same reason.

== Technical information ==
=== Subchannels ===
The station's signal is multiplexed:

Subchannels of KYLE-TV
Subchannel	Res.	Short name	Programming
28.1	720p	KYLE-TV	Main KYLE-TV programming
28.2	720p	FOX44	Fox (KWKT-TV)
28.3	480i	AntTV	Antenna TV
28.4	480i	Laff	Laff

Simulcast of subchannels of another station

=== Analog-to-digital conversion ===
KYLE-TV shut down its analog signal, over UHF channel 28, on June 12, 2009, the official date on which full-power television stations in the United States transitioned from analog to digital broadcasts under federal mandate. The station's digital signal relocated from its pre-transition UHF channel 29 to channel 28 for post-transition operations.
