= KLFX =

- Nolanville, Texas; United States
- Broadcast area: Killeen-Temple-Fort Hood metropolitan area
- Frequency: 107.3 MHz (HD Radio)
- Branding: 107.3 The Fox

Programming
- Format: Active rock
- Affiliations: Westwood One

Ownership
- Owner: iHeartMedia; (iHM Licenses, LLC)
- Sister stations: KBGO, KBRQ, KIIZ-FM, KWTX, KWTX-FM, WACO-FM

History
- First air date: March 27, 1995
- Former call signs: KKFF (1993–1994, CP)
- Call sign meaning: "Fox"

Technical information
- Licensing authority: FCC
- Facility ID: 60090
- Class: A
- ERP: 1,950 watts
- HAAT: 160 meters (520 ft)
- Transmitter coordinates: 31°5′39″N 97°34′52″W

Links
- Public license information: Public file; LMS
- Webcast: Listen live (via iHeartRadio)
- Website: 1073rocks.iheart.com

KLFX (107.3 FM, "107.3 The Fox") is a radio station broadcasting an active rock format. Licensed to Nolanville, Texas, United States, the station serves the Killeen-Temple area. The station is currently owned by iHeartMedia and features programming from Westwood One. The station's studios are located in Harker Heights, and its transmitter is located in Nolanville.

== History ==
The station went on the air as KLFX on March 27, 1995. The facility was issued an initial construction permit on February 22, 1993, and assigned the callsign KKFF on March 29, 1993. Prior to sign-on, the callsign was changed to the current KLFX on November 1, 1994. The station airs much of the same playlist and specialty programming as sister station 102.5 KBRQ in Waco, typically in simulcast, but running its own imaging and commercial load specific to the Temple-Killeen-Fort Hood market.
