= KWTX-FM =

Radio station in Waco, Texas

Coordinates: 31°20′16″N 97°18′36″W

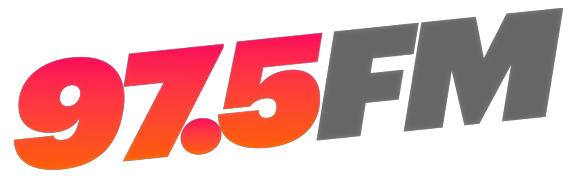
- Waco, Texas; United States
- Broadcast area: Waco metropolitan area
- Frequency: 97.5 MHz
- Branding: 97.5 FM

Programming
- Language: English
- Format: Contemporary hit radio
- Affiliations: Premiere Networks

Ownership
- Owner: iHeartMedia; (iHM Licenses, LLC)
- Sister stations: KBGO; KBRQ; KIIZ-FM; KLFX; KWTX; WACO-FM

History
- First air date: December 7, 1970
- Call sign meaning: Waco, Texas

Technical information
- Licensing authority: FCC
- Facility ID: 35902
- Class: C
- ERP: 100,000 watts
- HAAT: 430 meters (1,410 ft)

Links
- Public license information: Public file; LMS
- Webcast: Listen live (via iHeartRadio)
- Website: 975online.iheart.com

KWTX-FM (97.5 MHz) is a commercial contemporary hit radio station in Waco, Texas. Branded "97.5 FM", the station is owned and operated by iHeartMedia. Its studios are located on Highway 6 in Waco, and its transmitter is located northeast of Moody, Texas.

== History ==
KWTX-FM first signed on December 7, 1970 and was the sister station of KWTX AM and TV. The station aired "The Golden Sound of Beautiful Music", and kept the beautiful music format until August 1982, when it shifted to adult contemporary. KWTX-FM then moved to contemporary hit radio in the mid-1980s.
