= WACO-FM =

Coordinates: 31.338°N 97.311°W

- Waco, Texas; United States
- Broadcast area: Waco, Killeen, and Temple, Texas
- Frequency: 99.9 MHz
- Branding: WACO 100

Programming
- Format: Country
- Affiliations: Premiere Networks

Ownership
- Owner: iHeartMedia; (iHM Licenses, LLC)
- Sister stations: KBGO, KBRQ, KIIZ-FM, KLFX, KWTX, KWTX-FM

History
- First air date: June 1960
- Former call signs: WACO-FM (1960–73); KHOO (1973–87); WACO-FM (1987–89); KTKS (1989–90)
- Call sign meaning: Waco

Technical information
- Licensing authority: FCC
- Facility ID: 59264
- Class: C
- ERP: 90,000 watts
- HAAT: 506 meters (1,660 ft)

Links
- Public license information: Public file; LMS
- Webcast: Listen Live
- Website: waco100.iheart.com

WACO-FM (99.9 MHz, "WACO 100") is a commercial radio station in Waco, Texas. It airs a country music radio format and is owned by iHeartMedia, Inc. The studios and offices are located on West Highway 6 in Southwest Waco. The transmitter is off Tower Drive in McLennan County in the community of Moody, amid towers for other local FM and TV stations.

WACO-FM has an effective radiated power (ERP) of 90,000 watts, broadcasting from a tower 1,660 feet (505.968 m) in height above average terrain (HAAT). The station brands itself as "WACO 100, a station so big they named the entire city after it." The station can be heard from Dallas/Ft. Worth to Austin.

== Programming ==
Weekdays begin at 5am with the "Bobby Bones Show." Scotty is on weekdays from 10am-3pm with the Lunch Country Classics. Dana McKenzie takes over afternoons on WACO 100 from 3-7pm with The Drive at 5, followed by nights with Boxer from 7p-Midnight, WACO-FM carries the syndicated CMT After Midnight with Granger Smith.

Notable weekend programming includes Bobby Bones "Country Top 30 Countdown" Saturday mornings, and "The Women of iHeart Country" Sunday mornings with Amy.

== History ==
=== Early years ===
WACO-FM signed on in June 1960, it was the FM counterpart to AM 1460 WACO, which had been owned by the Waco Broadcasting Company since its founding in 1922. WACO-AM-FM simulcast a country music format and were affiliated with ABC Radio News. WACO-FM was powered at 3,900 watts, a fraction of its current output.

In the late 1960s, WACO-FM switched to an automated easy listening format while the AM station continued to play country music. In July 1973, the FM station switched call letters to KHOO and adopted a Country format. On September 1, 1979, KHOO switched to Adult Contemporary. In October 1987, the station returned back to its original call letters, WACO-FM, relaunching with a brighter AC format. In February 1989, the station switched its call letters to KTKS, using the same call letters and branding ("Kiss") that had previously been on KHKS/Dallas.

=== Switch to country ===
On February 7, 1990, 99.9 flipped back to its original call letters, WACO-FM, dropped its AC format, and switched back to country music, initially simulcasting its AM sister station outside of morning drive. In 1991, the branding was changed from "FM 100" to the current "WACO 100." In 1996, the AM station was sold and switched to all-sports as KKTK, while the country music continued on WACO-FM.

WACO-FM was bought by Capstar Broadcasting, which was later acquired by Clear Channel Communications, a forerunner of current owner iHeartMedia.

=== Unusual call letters ===
WACO-FM is one of three stations in the United States where the call letters spell out the name of the city of license. The other stations are WARE in Ware, Massachusetts, and WISE-FM in Wise, Virginia, a satellite of NPR station WVTF. In addition, WACO-FM is also one of a small number of call signs whose beginning letter deviates from FCC standards of W in the East and K in the West.

Originally the WACO call letters were on an AM radio station that went on the air in Waco in 1922 as WJAD, but later changed to WACO. In the early days of broadcasting, radio stations in Texas were given call signs beginning with W. The border between Texas and New Mexico had been part of the dividing line between W and K. By 1923, the border had been moved to the Mississippi River, putting Texas in K territory. Stations already on the air, such as WOAI in San Antonio and WBAP in Fort Worth, were allowed to keep their W call signs. In 1960, when WACO added an FM counterpart, that station was able to share its unique call letters, with an -FM suffix. In 1996, WACO (AM) changed its call letters to KKTK and later moved into the Dallas-Fort Worth Metroplex radio market as KCLE. WACO-FM was allowed to keep its call sign, which it operates under to this day.
