= KBRQ =

- Hillsboro, Texas; United States
- Broadcast area: Waco metropolitan area
- Frequency: 102.5 MHz
- Branding: 102.5 The Bear

Programming
- Format: Active rock
- Affiliations: Westwood One

Ownership
- Owner: iHeartMedia; (iHM Licenses, LLC)
- Sister stations: KBGO, KIIZ-FM, KLFX, KWTX, KWTX-FM, WACO-FM

History
- First air date: 1959 (as KHBR-FM)
- Former call signs: KHBR-FM (1959–1983); KJNE (1983–1994)
- Former frequencies: 102.3 (1959-61)
- Call sign meaning: BeaR

Technical information
- Licensing authority: FCC
- Facility ID: 60805
- Class: C1
- ERP: 100,000 watts
- HAAT: 137 meters (449 ft)
- Transmitter coordinates: 31°49′23″N 97°9′35″W

Links
- Public license information: Public file; LMS
- Webcast: Listen Live
- Website: 1025thebear.iheart.com

KBRQ (102.5 FM, "The Bear") is a radio station broadcasting an active rock format. Licensed to Hillsboro, Texas, United States, the station serves the Waco area. The station is currently owned by iHeartMedia, Inc. and features programming from Westwood One. Its studios are located on Highway 6 in Waco, and its transmitter is located west of West, Texas.

== History ==
A construction permit for 102.3 in Hillsboro was issued in 1959, and KHBR-FM was officially licensed on June 30, 1960. The relatively low-powered station (3,200 watts ERP for most of its time as KHBR-FM) had its antenna side mounted on the KHBR (AM) tower on Country Club Road in Hillsboro. It operated as a simulcast of KHBR and continued the day format at night. In 1961, the station shifted from 102.3 to 102.5.

KHBR-FM was sold in 1983 to interests in Cleburne, Texas, becoming KJNE on September 14 of that year. The new KJNE signed on in March 1984, upgraded from 32,000 to 100,000 watts from a tower near the city of West to become fully competitive in the Waco market. The studios were moved to Waco, but to comply with regulations at the time, some of KJNE's programming would still originate from studios in the city of license, Hillsboro.

On February 1, 1994, the station changed its call sign to the current KBRQ and switched to a Classic Rock format.

KBRQ and KLFX out of Killeen share the same active rock programming and weekend shows.
