= KUSJ =

- Harker Heights, Texas; United States
- Broadcast area: Killeen-Temple area
- Frequency: 105.5 MHz
- Branding: US 105

Programming
- Format: Country music
- Affiliations: Compass Media Networks; Westwood One

Ownership
- Owner: Townsquare Media; (Townsquare Media Killeen-Temple License, LLC)
- Sister stations: KLTD, KOOC, KSSM, KTEM

History
- First air date: April 9, 1987 (as KIXS)
- Former call signs: KIXS (1987–1990); KLFX (1990–1994); KLTX (1994–1996); KNRV (1996–1997); KYUL (1997–2000)
- Call sign meaning: K US 105 (the branding) J

Technical information
- Licensing authority: FCC
- Facility ID: 60803
- Class: C2
- ERP: 33,000 watts
- HAAT: 183 meters (600 ft)
- Transmitter coordinates: 30°59′9″N 97°37′51″W

Links
- Public license information: Public file; LMS
- Webcast: Listen Live
- Website: myus105.com

KUSJ (105.5 FM) is a radio station broadcasting a country music format. Licensed to Harker Heights, Texas, United States, the station serves the Killeen-Temple radio market. The station is currently owned by Townsquare Media. The station's studios are located in Temple, and its transmitter is located south of Stillhouse Hollow Lake in unincorporated Bell County.

== History ==
The station went on the air as KIXS on 1987-04-09. On 1990-08-03, the station changed its call sign to KLFX, on 1994-10-26 to KLTX, on 1996-04-24 to KNRV, on 1997-04-11 to KYUL, and on 2000-04-19 to the current KUSJ.

The morning show is hosted by Tasha Stevens, the afternoon is Jess On the Job followed by Buddy Logan and The Ride Home. The evening program block is Evan Paul's Taste of Country Nights.
