= KCEN-TV =

Television station in Temple, Texas

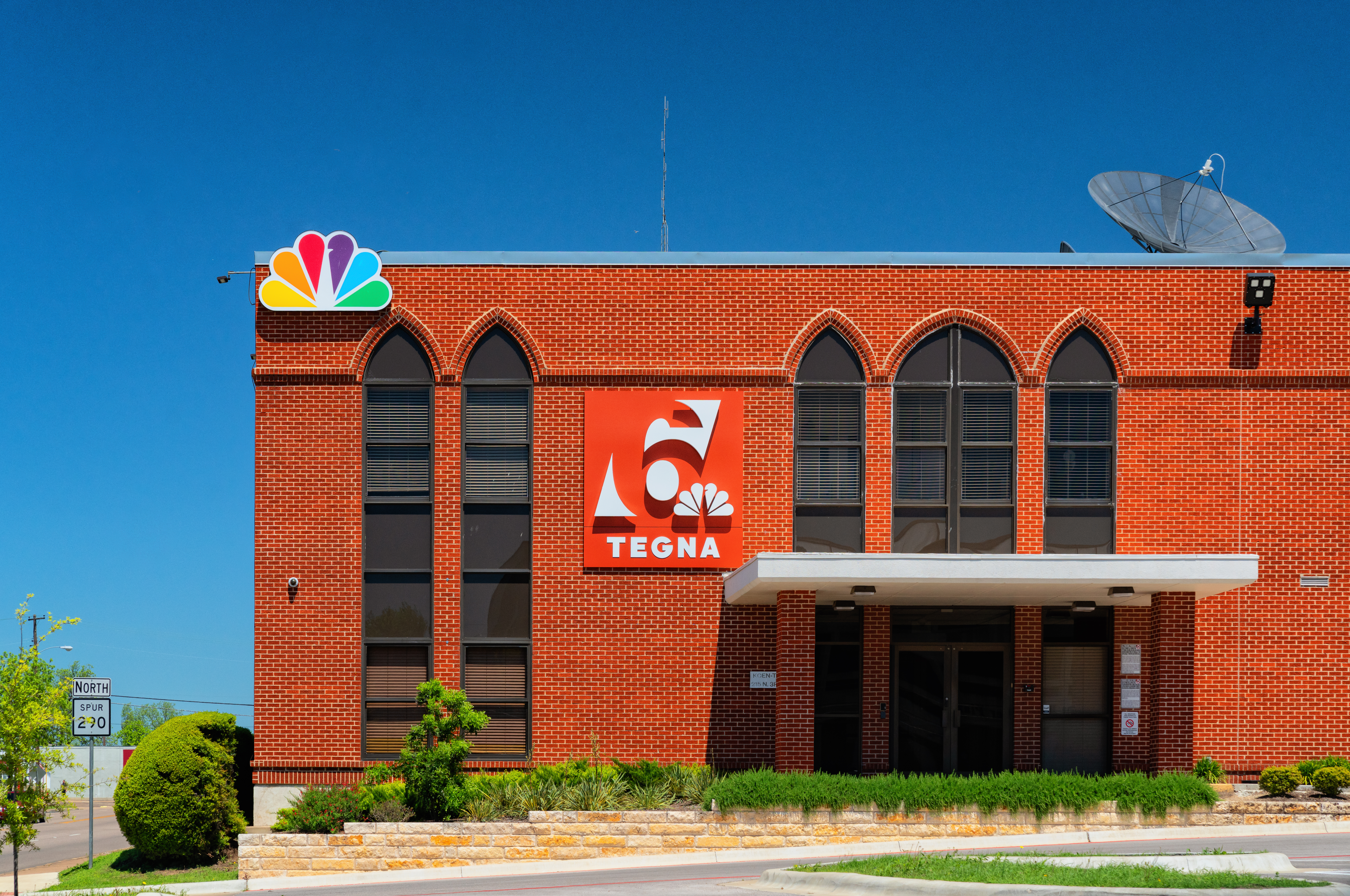
- KCEN-TV's studios on Third Street in Temple
- Temple–Killeen–Waco, Texas; United States
- City: Temple, Texas
- Channels: Digital: 9 (VHF); Virtual: 6
- Branding: Channel 6 (general); 6 News (newscasts)

Programming
- Affiliations: 6.1: NBC; for others, see § Technical information and subchannels

Ownership
- Owner: Tegna Inc., a subsidiary of Nexstar Media Group; (LSB Broadcasting, Inc.)
- Sister stations: KAGS-LD; Nexstar: KYLE-TV, KWKT-TV

History
- First air date: November 1, 1953
- Former channel numbers: Analog: 6 (VHF, 1953–2009); Virtual: 9 (2009–2010)
- Former affiliations: NBC (1953–1984); CBS (secondary, 1953–1955); DuMont (secondary, 1953–1955); ABC (secondary 1953–1984, primary 1984–1985)
- Call sign meaning: Central Texas

Technical information
- Licensing authority: FCC
- Facility ID: 10245
- ERP: 25 kW
- HAAT: 527 m (1,729 ft)
- Transmitter coordinates: 31°16′25″N 97°13′15″W

Links
- Public license information: Public file; LMS
- Website: www.kcentv.com

KCEN-TV (channel 6) is a television station licensed to Temple, Texas, United States, serving Central Texas as an affiliate of NBC. It is owned the Tegna subsidiary of Nexstar Media Group; Nexstar also owns KWKT-TV (channel 44), a Fox affiliate, and KYLE-TV (channel 28), an independent station with MyNetworkTV. KCEN-TV maintains studios on North 3rd Street in downtown Temple, with a news bureau and sales office in Killeen; its transmitter is located along I-35 south of Eddy.

KAGS-LD (channel 23) in Bryan operates as a low-power semi-satellite of KCEN-TV, serving the Brazos Valley. As such, it simulcasts all network and syndicated programming as provided through KCEN-TV but airs separate local newscasts, commercial inserts and legal identifications, and has its own website. KCEN-TV serves the western half of the Waco–Temple–Bryan market while KAGS-LD serves the eastern portion. The two stations are counted as a single unit for ratings purposes. Although KAGS-LD maintains its own studios on South Texas Avenue in Bryan, master control and some internal operations are based at KCEN-TV's facilities.

== History ==
The station signed on the air for the first time on November 1, 1953, originally owned by Frank W. Mayborn, publisher of the Temple Daily Telegram and owner of KTEM radio (1400 AM) in Temple. Early on, Mayborn realized that Temple–Killeen and Waco were going to be a single television market (although, then now, they are separate radio markets). To signify that his new station would serve all of Central Texas, Mayborn decided on the call letters KCEN-TV (for "Central Texas"), rather than KTEM-TV (for Temple), after his radio station property. He also built his studio and transmitter near Eddy, roughly halfway between Temple and Waco.

It was the first television station to serve the Waco–Temple–Killeen market, and the second television station in Central Texas, signing on one year after Austin's KTBC. KCEN signed on with one of the tallest transmitter towers in the southwestern United States, operating at a height of 830 feet (250 m). The station originally carried programming from all four major networks at the time but was a primary NBC affiliate. KCEN lost the CBS affiliation to KWTX-TV on January 1, 1956. The DuMont Television Network ceased operations later that year, leaving KCEN with a primary NBC affiliation and a secondary affiliation with ABC.

For many decades since the Waco–Temple–Killeen market's introduction to cable in 1965, it was sandwiched with stations from other markets, with Dallas–Fort Worth (channels 4, 5, 8, and 11) to the north, Houston (channels 2, 11, and 13) to the southeast, and Austin (channels 7, 24, and 42, later 36) to the south and southwest (as well as some cable providers in the southeast).

In 1981, KCEN activated a new 1,924-foot (586 m) tower just to the east of the original tower, expanding its coverage area to almost 29,000 square miles (75,000 km^{2})—one of the largest television station broadcast radiuses in the nation. The station now provides at least secondary over-the-air coverage to 33 counties–from the southern fringes of the Dallas–Fort Worth market to the northern fringes of the Austin market.

The station switched its primary affiliation to ABC on June 25, 1984, while continuing to carry some NBC programs during off-hours. When KXXV signed on the air on March 22, 1985, that station became the new primary NBC affiliate. However, over time, channel 6 became one of several ABC affiliates nationwide that were disappointed with the network's weak programming offerings, particularly on Thursday nights, which were bogging down KCEN's otherwise successful lineup. Meanwhile, nine months later on December 30, the NBC affiliation returned to KCEN, while KXXV picked up the ABC affiliation. KCEN was the first television station in Central Texas to provide closed captions in its programming in September 1989.

KCEN, the Temple Daily Telegram and the Killeen Daily Herald remained under the Mayborn family's ownership after Frank's death in 1987, with his third wife, Sue, taking over running the station. In January 2009, Frank Mayborn Enterprises, Inc. entered into an agreement to sell KCEN to Dallas-based London Broadcasting Company, with a purchase price of $26 million—a handsome return on Frank Mayborn's original investment in KTEM radio in 1936.

KCEN had operated a low-power translator in the Brazos Valley on UHF channel 62 for many years. On January 20, 2003, this translator was upgraded to Class A status on UHF channel 23 under new calls, KMAY-LP. Like its low-power predecessor, it was a straight simulcast of KCEN, only mentioned in legal IDs. KMAY switched to digital on June 12, 2009. On July 3, 2011, London Broadcasting announced that KMAY would be converted to a semi-satellite of KCEN for the Bryan–College Station submarket under the new callsign KAGS-LD, with local news programming and commercial advertisements from KCEN replaced with newscasts and commercials targeted to the Brazos Valley area. KAGS was relaunched as a locally focused station in October of that year. On September 26, 2011, Azteca América programming on digital subchannel 6.3 was replaced with programming from classic television network MeTV.

On May 14, 2014, the Gannett Company announced that it would acquire KCEN-TV and five other LBC stations for $215 million. Gannett's CEO Gracia Martore touted that the acquisition would give the company a presence in several fast-growing markets, and opportunities for local advertisers to leverage its digital marketing platform. The sale was completed on July 8, 2014. 13 months later, on June 29, 2015, the Gannett Company split in two, with one side specializing in print media and the other side specializing in broadcast and digital media. KCEN was retained by the latter company, named Tegna. However, KCEN retained its London Broadcasting-era website until September 2016.

In January 2016, KCEN announced it would vacate its longtime studios in Eddy and move to the former complex of First Baptist Church in downtown Temple. Station management explained that the fast-growth of Bell County contributed to their decision; general manager Gayle Kiger said that it was important for "the fastest-growing and largest county" in the channel 6 coverage area to have a station based there. He also said that KCEN would have likely had to move anyway, as there was not enough room to expand its Eddy facility. The move was completed in early 2017.

Nexstar Media Group, owner of KWKT and KYLE-TV in the Central Texas market, acquired Tegna in a deal announced in August 2025 and completed on March 19, 2026.

== News operation ==
KCEN-TV presently broadcasts a total of 22 hours, 25 minutes of local newscasts each week (with 4 hours, 5 minutes each weekday and one hour each on Saturdays and Sundays). On February 1, 2010, KCEN became the first television station in the Waco–Temple–Killeen market to begin broadcasting its local newscasts in high definition.

On March 23, 2015, KCEN-TV debuted the Gannett group's graphical theme.

== Technical information and subchannels ==
The station's signal is multiplexed:

Subchanels of KCEN-TV
Subchannel	Res.	Short name	Programming
6.1	720p	KCEN-HD	NBC
6.2	720p	MYTX	Quest / Dallas Mavericks games
6.3	480i	Crime	True Crime Network
6.4	480i	OPEN	[Blank] (4:3)
6.5	480i	GetTV	Great
6.6	480i	OPEN	[Blank]
6.7	480i	OPEN	[Blank]
6.8	480i	Charge!	Charge!
6.9	480i	ShopLC	Shop LC

=== Analog-to-digital conversion ===
KCEN-TV shut down its analog signal, over VHF channel 6, on February 17, 2009, the original target date on which full-power television stations in the United States were to transition from analog to digital broadcasts under federal mandate (which was later pushed back to June 12, 2009). The station's digital signal remained on its pre-transition VHF channel 9.

Though most television stations typically map their virtual channels to that station's analog channel allocation pre-transition, digital television receivers displayed KCEN-TV's virtual channel following the transition as 9, instead of 6 with the station's on-air branding changing to "KCEN 9" in accordance. The station's virtual channel changed to its former VHF analog channel 6 (its on-air branding was changed to simply "KCEN-HD" as well) on February 1, 2010.
