= NCAA volleyball =

NCAA volleyball may refer to:

- NCAA Women's Volleyball Championship
- NCAA Volleyball Championship (Philippines)
- NCAA Men's National Collegiate Volleyball Championship
- NCAA Men's Division III Volleyball Championship
- NCAA Beach Volleyball Championship
- NCAA Beach Volleyball Championship (Philippines)
- Molten Division III Men's Invitational Volleyball Championship Tournament
