= KBTX-TV =

Television station in Bryan, Texas

Semi-satellite of KWTX-TV, Waco, Texas

- Bryan–College Station, Texas; United States
- City: Bryan, Texas
- Channels: Digital: 16 (UHF); Virtual: 3
- Branding: KBTX 3; CW 8 Aggieland (3.2)

Programming
- Affiliations: 3.1: CBS; 3.2: The CW; for others, see § KBTX-TV subchannels

Ownership
- Owner: Gray Media; (Gray Television Licensee, LLC)
- Sister stations: KWTX-TV, KNCT

History
- First air date: May 22, 1957
- Former channel numbers: Analog: 3 (VHF, 1957–2009)
- Former affiliations: CBS (1957–1977); ABC (secondary 1957–1977, primary 1977–1983)
- Call sign meaning: Bryan, Texas

Technical information
- Licensing authority: FCC
- Facility ID: 6669
- ERP: 685 kW
- HAAT: 506.2 m (1,661 ft)
- Transmitter coordinates: 30°33′16.5″N 96°1′52.3″W

Links
- Public license information: Public file; LMS
- Website: www.kbtx.com

KNXG-LD
ATSC 3.0 station Translator of KBTX-TV
- College Station, Texas
- Channels: Digital: 27 (UHF); Virtual: 27

Programming
- Affiliations: 27.1: CBS; 27.2: The CW; 27.3: Telemundo

History
- Founded: February 25, 2010
- First air date: March 14, 2014
- Former channel numbers: Digital: 49 (UHF, 2014–2018)
- Former affiliations: Silent (2018–2021)
- Call sign meaning: Next Generation Television

Technical information
- Licensing authority: FCC
- Facility ID: 182059
- Class: LD
- ERP: 15 kW
- HAAT: 422.4 m (1,386 ft)
- Transmitter coordinates: 30°33′16.5″N 96°1′52.3″W

Links
- Public license information: LMS

KBTX-TV (channel 3) is a television station in Bryan, Texas, United States, serving the Brazos Valley as an affiliate of CBS and The CW. Owned by Gray Media, the station maintains studios on East 29th Street in Bryan; its transmitter is located northwest of Anderson, Texas.

Although identifying as a separate station, KBTX-TV is considered a semi-satellite of KWTX-TV (channel 10) in Waco. KBTX-TV simulcasts all network and syndicated programming provided by its parent station but airs separate commercial inserts, legal identifications, local newscasts and Sunday morning religious programs; the station also has its own website. KBTX-TV serves the eastern half of the Waco–Temple–Bryan market while KWTX-TV serves the western portion. The two stations are counted as a single unit for ratings purposes. Although KBTX-TV maintains its own facilities, master control and some internal operations are based at KWTX-TV's studios on American Plaza in Waco.

KBTX-TV is sister to Belton-licensed CW affiliate KNCT (channel 46), which shares studios with KWTX-TV.

KBTX-TV also offers CW programming on its second digital subchannel. Prior to the September 2006 merger of The WB and UPN, KBTX-TV offered UPN programming on digital. Following the merger, CW Texas was launched as a joint effort between KBTX-TV and KWTX-TV. On August 8, 2012, CW Texas became CW8 Aggieland, which carries programming from The CW as well as a variety of local sports offerings and many syndicated shows.

KBTX-TV falls under the "KBTX Media" banner, which also includes CW8 Aggieland and KBTX.com.

== History ==
KBTX-TV was the first television station in the Brazos Valley, first going on air on May 22, 1957. It has broadcast from the same studio in Bryan for its entire history, though the building has been renovated multiple times. Originally a primary CBS affiliate with a secondary ABC affiliation, KBTX became a primary affiliate of ABC in September 1977 along with parent station KWTX-TV in Waco. Both stations reverted to CBS in September 1983.

On October 14, 1983, KBTX opened a new transmitter in the Grimes County community of Carlos. The 1,700-foot (518 m) tower nearly doubled the number of homes the station reached.

Perhaps the most noteworthy coverage from KBTX was on November 18, 1999. Early that morning, the Aggie Bonfire stack collapsed, killing 12 and injuring 27. The station provided non-stop coverage of the event, and served as a major source of information locally and nationally in the hours that followed.

KBTX celebrated its 50th anniversary in May 2007. Many former on-air staff returned for the celebration, including some who guest-anchored newscasts.

In accordance with the original February 2009 date mandated by the federal government, KBTX permanently shut down its analog signal on January 20, 2009, as it made the transition to digital television. On February 28, 2009, KBTX began broadcasting digitally at full power from the enhanced Carlos tower, again expanding its signal dramatically. The station had been broadcasting on low power digital between its analog signal shutdown and the full power activation, in addition to being carried on cable systems and DirecTV.

KBTX and KWTX experimented with a jointly-run noon newscast in early 2009. News stories for both viewing areas were read from the KWTX studios in Waco for the first half of the show, with KBTX running live weather and additional local content from its studios for the remainder of the show airing in the Brazos Valley. KWTX aired its own live weather and content in its part of the market during that time. However, in late March 2009, the two stations returned to running separate newscasts, with KBTX citing "an overwhelming request from viewers for the show to be based out of the Twin Cities again".

In 2009, KBTX reached agreements with Dish Network and DirecTV. For years, Dish Network had refused to offer KBTX to the Bryan–College Station area and had simply carried KWTX. However, in 2009, Dish relented. On April 23 of that year, KBTX was made available in the Waco–Temple–Bryan market area. In May 2009, after years of carrying KBTX to the market, DirecTV announced it would be dropping KBTX from its service. In June 2009, an agreement was reached to keep the station available to DirecTV customers.

On September 12, 2011, KBTX launched a 4 p.m. newscast, titled First News at Four, replacing The Oprah Winfrey Show alongside Inside Edition at 4:30.

On October 10, 2011, KBTX began broadcasting its newscasts in high definition, making it the first live and local broadcaster in the Brazos Valley with HD news.

== Subchannels ==
The station's signal is multiplexed:

=== KBTX-TV subchannels ===
Subchannels of KBTX-TV
Subchannel	Res.	Short name	Programming
3.1	1080i	KBTX-DT	CBS
3.2	720p	KBTX-CW	The CW
3.3	480i	KBTX-TM	Telemundo
3.4	480i	The365	365BLK
3.5	480i	KBTX-WX	KBTX Weather

=== KNXG-LD subchannels ===
Subchannels of KNXG-LD
Subchannel	Res.	Short name	Programming
27.1	1080i	KNXGLD1	ATSC 3.0 simulcast of KBTX-TV / CBS
27.2	1080i	KNXGLD2	ATSC 3.0 simulcast of KBTX-DT2 / CW Texas
27.3	1080i	KNXGLD3	ATSC 3.0 simulcast of KBTX-DT3 / Telemundo

== Coverage area ==
KBTX serves Brazos, Burleson, Grimes, Leon, Madison, Milam, Montgomery, Robertson, Walker and Washington counties. Grimes, Montgomery and Walker counties are part of the Houston market, but receive KBTX. Texas A&M University, Sam Houston State University and Blinn College are in its coverage area.

With its digital signal transmitting at the maximum power allowed by law as of early 2009, the KBTX signal also reaches Houston County in the Tyler–Longview market; Trinity, San Jacinto, Austin, Harris and Waller counties in the Houston market; and Lee County in the Austin market. KBTX's weather team monitors those counties and provides forecasts and updates, including during severe weather events. High school sports teams in those counties will also often be covered in KBTX's sports segments.

For most of its first half-century on the air, KBTX was the only station airing a full schedule of locally-focused news for the eastern half of the market. The brief attempt to produce a single noon newscast for this vast market failed in 2009 in part because of overwhelming viewer demand.

KBTX previously served as the de facto CBS station in Houston County in the Tyler market until KYTX signed on in 2004.

KBTX is part of a rare American television market, the Waco–Temple–Bryan Designated Market Area. Only a handful of DMAs in the country have multiple stations under the same network affiliation serving viewers (KBTX serving the Bryan–College Station area, KWTX serving the Waco–Temple–Killeen area), even though in this case, both stations are associated with each other.

== Awards ==
KBTX competes in Division 3, which includes the largest Texas markets outside the four major metro areas (Dallas–Fort Worth, Houston, San Antonio and Austin). In November 2012, KBTX was honored with a Lone Star Emmy for outstanding evening newscast in a smaller market. This was the second Lone Star Emmy win for KBTX. In 2011, the series To Avery with Love won the award for health/science feature.

KBTX also won an AP award for "Best Spot News Reporting" for its coverage of the Aggie Bonfire collapse in 1999.

Aggie Game Day, News 3 Sports' pregame show before Texas A&M home football games, is a multi-time recipient of honors from the national Telly Awards for outstanding local programming. All the Best: 10 Years of the George Bush Presidential Library, which aired the day before the grand reopening of the 41st president's library and museum on the Texas A&M campus received a Telly. The main exhibit of the museum was closed for months during an $8.5 million renovation that coincided with the facility's anniversary.

== See also ==
- KWTX-TV
