= KIIZ-FM =

Coordinates: 31.108°N 97.664°W

- Killeen, Texas; United States
- Broadcast area: Killeen, Harker Heights, Temple, Copperas Cove, Nolanville, and Fort Cavazos
- Frequency: 92.3 MHz
- Branding: Z-92.3

Programming
- Format: Urban contemporary
- Affiliations: Premiere Networks

Ownership
- Owner: iHeartMedia; (iHM Licenses, LLC)
- Sister stations: KBGO, KBRQ, KLFX, KWTX, KWTX-FM, WACO-FM

History
- First air date: 1979
- Call sign meaning: "Killeen Z"

Technical information
- Licensing authority: FCC
- Facility ID: 60802
- Class: A
- ERP: 6,000 watts
- HAAT: 73 meters (240 ft)

Links
- Public license information: Public file; LMS
- Webcast: Listen live (via iHeartRadio)
- Website: kiiz.iheart.com

KIIZ-FM (92.3 MHz or Z-92.3) is a commercial urban contemporary radio station in Killeen, Texas. The station is owned and operated by iHeartMedia The station's studios are located in nearby Harker Heights, and its transmitter is located in Killeen.

== History ==
KIIZ started in 1979 on 1050 AM. On February 15, 1991, KIIZ moved the station from the AM dial to the FM dial on to 92.3 FM.
