= KTEM =

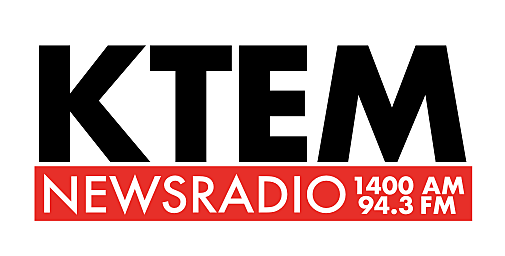
- Temple, Texas; United States
- Broadcast area: Killeen-Temple, Texas
- Frequency: 1400 kHz
- Branding: KTEM Newsradio 1400

Programming
- Format: Talk
- Affiliations: Fox News Radio

Ownership
- Owner: Townsquare Media; (Townsquare Media Killeen-Temple License, LLC)
- Sister stations: KLTD, KOOC, KSSM, KUSJ

History
- First air date: November 26, 1936
- Call sign meaning: Temple

Technical information
- Licensing authority: FCC
- Facility ID: 63200
- Class: C
- Power: 950 watts
- Transmitter coordinates: 31°03′56″N 97°23′57″W
- Translator: 94.3 K232FU (Temple)

Links
- Public license information: Public file; LMS
- Webcast: Listen live
- Website: ktemnews.com

KTEM (1400 AM) is a commercial radio station licensed to Temple, Texas, United States, serving the Killeen-Temple area with a talk format. KTEM is owned by Townsquare Media, through licensee Townsquare Media Killeen-Temple License, LLC. Its studios and offices are on Moody Lane in Temple.

KTEM is powered at 950 watts, using a non-directional antenna. Its transmitter is on Shallow Ford Road near Lions Park in Temple. Programming is also heard on 250-watt FM translator K232FU at 94.3 MHz in Temple.

== History ==
The station signed on the air on November 26, 1936. It has always had the call sign KTEM. Originally it broadcast on 1370 kilocycles and was powered at 250 watts. It was a daytimer, required to go off the air at sunset. The studios were in the Kyle Hotel.

With the 1941 enactment of the North American Regional Broadcasting Agreement (NARBA), KTEM moved to 1400 AM. It kept its 250 watt transmitter but was authorized to broadcast both day and night. It became a network affiliate of the Mutual Broadcasting System, carrying its news, sports, dramas and comedies during the "Golden Age of Radio."

In the 1960s and 70s, KTEM broadcast a Top 40 format, playing the top hits of the day. In 1975, KTEM added an FM station, KPLE 104.9 MHz, airing a beautiful music sound. That station is now 104.3 KLQB in the Austin area.

As listening to Top 40 music switched from AM to FM in the 1980s, KTEM shifted to a mix of adult contemporary music, news, talk and sports. By the 1990s, the music was eliminated as KTEM switched to all-talk programming.
