= KOOV (FM) =

Catholic radio station in Kempner, Texas

Coordinates: 31.1004°N 97.9278°W

- Kempner, Texas; United States
- Broadcast area: Killeen, Texas
- Frequency: 106.9 MHz
- Branding: Armor of God Radio

Programming
- Format: Catholic Radio
- Affiliations: EWTN

Ownership
- Owner: Armor of God Catholic Radio Apostolate

History
- First air date: 1978 (as KHLB-FM)
- Former call signs: KHLB-FM (1978–1981); KMRB-FM (1981–1985); KHLB-FM (1985–2004); KHLB (2004–2005); KHLE (2005–2013)

Technical information
- Licensing authority: FCC
- Facility ID: 34948
- Class: A
- ERP: 2,300 watts
- HAAT: 164 meters

Links
- Public license information: Public file; LMS
- Website: armorofgodradio.com

KOOV (106.9 FM) is a radio station broadcasting a Catholic ministry radio format. Licensed to Kempner, Texas, United States, it serves the Killeen-Temple area. The station is currently owned by Armor of God Catholic Radio Apostolate. The station is an affiliate of the EWTN radio network.
