= KWTX-TV =

Television station in Waco, Texas

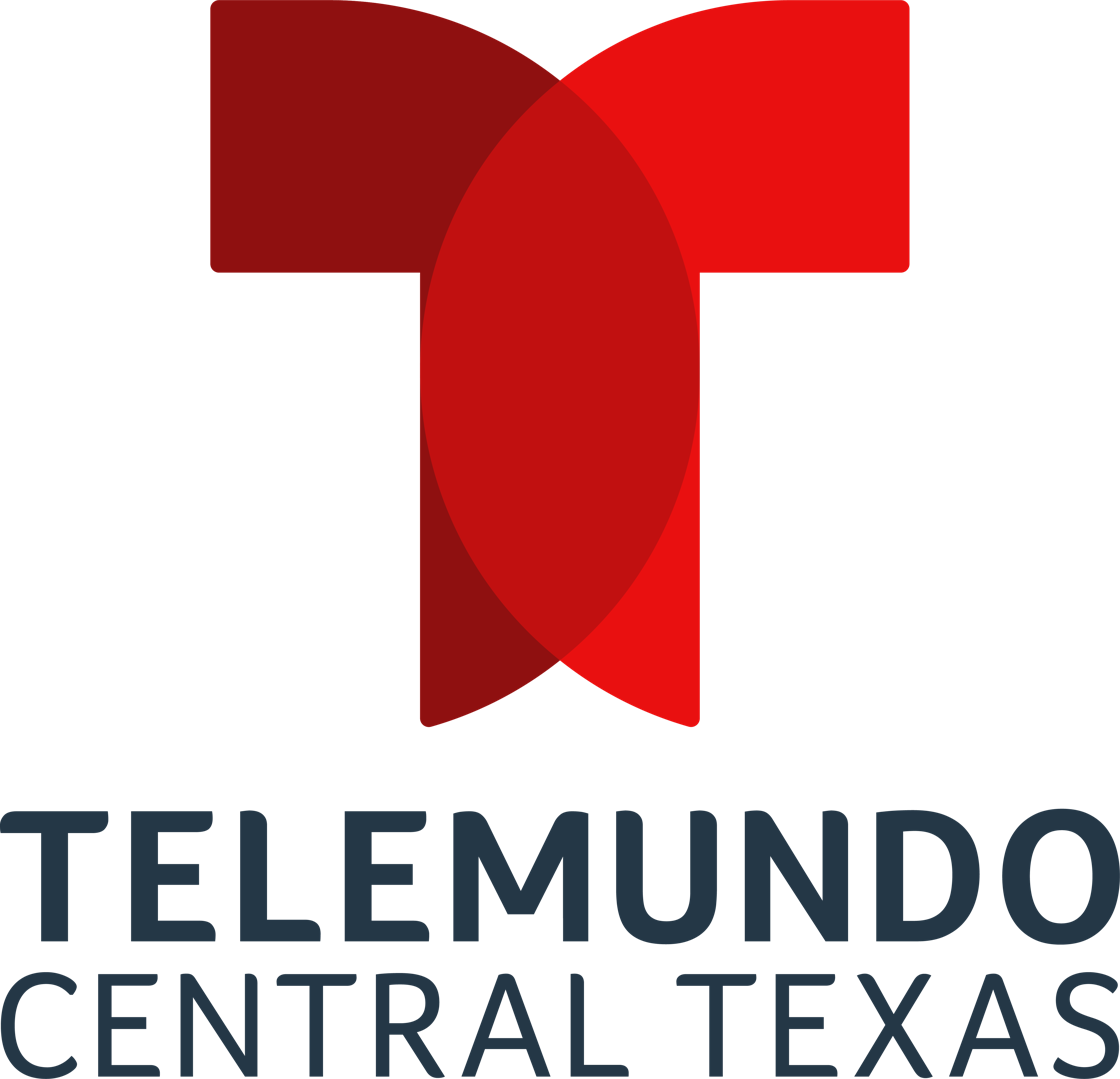
- Waco–Temple–Killeen, Texas; United States
- City: Waco, Texas
- Channels: Digital: 10 (VHF); Virtual: 10
- Branding: KWTX 10; Telemundo Central Texas (10.2)

Programming
- Affiliations: 10.1: CBS; 10.2: Telemundo; for others, see § Subchannels

Ownership
- Owner: Gray Media; (Gray Television Licensee, LLC)
- Sister stations: KNCT; KBTX-TV

History
- First air date: April 3, 1955
- Former channel numbers: Analog: 10 (VHF, 1955–2009); Digital: 53 (UHF, 2001–2009)
- Former affiliations: Independent (April–May 1955); ABC (primary, May–December 1955 and 1977–1983; secondary, 1956–1977); UPN (10.2, January–September 2006); The CW (10.2, September 2006–2019)
- Call sign meaning: Waco, Texas

Technical information
- Licensing authority: FCC
- Facility ID: 35903
- ERP: 39 kW
- HAAT: 554.9 m (1,821 ft)
- Transmitter coordinates: 31°19′19.2″N 97°19′3″W

Links
- Public license information: Public file; LMS
- Website: www.kwtx.com; www.telemundocentraltexas.com (10.2)

KWTX-TV (channel 10) is a television station in Waco, Texas, United States, serving Central Texas as an affiliate of CBS and Telemundo. It is owned by Gray Media alongside Belton-licensed CW affiliate KNCT (channel 46). The two stations share studios on American Plaza in Waco; KWTX-TV's transmitter is located near Moody, Texas. KWTX and KBTX-TV in Bryan, a semi-satellite with its own commercials and news department, split the Waco–Temple–Bryan TV market.

KWTX-TV began broadcasting on April 3, 1955, as the television expansion of KWTX radio. After emerging from a two-year fight with WACO for the city's only allocated VHF TV channel, KWTX found itself with an unusually favored competitor. KANG-TV (channel 34), despite being a UHF station, held all the available network affiliations; it was owned by the family of Texas senator Lyndon B. Johnson. As such, KWTX was first an independent station and later an ABC affiliate in its early months before KANG-TV merged into it in December 1955. Competing with Temple-based KCEN-TV (channel 6), KWTX was the dominant station in Waco and maintained affiliations with CBS and ABC until 1983. Its present studio facility opened in 1987.

Gray acquired KWTX-TV, KBTX-TV, and KXII in Sherman in 1999 from the original ownership group. Gray director and current chief executive officer Hilton Howell was born in Waco and had grown up around the station, which his grandfather helped to found. KWTX has maintained its market-leading position while adding affiliations with The CW—transferred in 2019 to KNCT—and Telemundo.

== History ==
=== Construction and early years ===
The Federal Communications Commission (FCC) allocated television channels to Waco, Texas, in April 1952, upon the lifting of its years-long freeze on TV station grants. It authorized one very high frequency (VHF) TV channel for the city, channel 11; one commercial ultra high frequency (UHF) channel 34; and one educational UHF channel, 28. Three parties already had expressed interest in establishing a TV station in Waco. Two were existing radio broadcasters, KWTX (1230 AM) and WACO (1460 AM), while the third was Baylor University. Interests linked to WACO had filed for a television permit in 1948, while KWTX applied in December 1951, its application being signed at the company Christmas party. Both companies moved into new studio facilities with provisions for future television installations, and WACO even took delivery of cameras emblazoned "WACO-TV, Channel 11" and a transmitter. KWTX and WACO had each applied for channel 11, requiring a comparative hearing. The stations found themselves waiting as the FCC worked through a backlog of dozens of cities without television stations. With its application languishing, WACO-TV relinquished its equipment to the supplier, General Electric, so that GE could fulfill an equipment order by KRBC-TV of Abilene.

In September 1953, the FCC amended the table of allocations, changing Waco's VHF channel from 11 to 10. (Note: This allowed channel 11 to be allocated instead of channel 10 at Fort Worth, in turn permitting the allocation of channel 10 to Ada, Oklahoma.) Two weeks of hearings were held in January 1954 to determine which of KWTX or WACO would get the channel. By that time, Central Texas viewers already had two television stations. On November 1, 1953, KANG-TV began broadcasting on channel 34 from Waco and KCEN-TV on channel 6 from nearby Temple. KANG-TV offered ABC and DuMont programs, while KCEN-TV was affiliated with NBC. Alleging that adding a VHF TV station to Waco would cause unequal competition, KANG-TV ownership lobbied for channel 10 to be substituted with a UHF channel.

On October 7, 1954, FCC hearing examiner John B. Poindexter handed down an initial decision favoring KWTX over WACO for channel 10. He found that KWTX, which only operated the namesake AM station, owned fewer broadcast properties than WACO, in which 40 percent was held by the Texas State Network, with radio interests and the permit for Fort Worth's channel 11. He also ruled that KWTX was superior in the local residence of its owners and its proposed programs. WACO initially appealed before withdrawing its application on November 22, 1954, clearing the way for KWTX to build channel 10 as part of a settlement between the two companies. The existing KWTX facilities at 4520 Bosque Boulevard were expanded to accommodate the television operation, with a 461-foot (141 m) tower built nearby.

KWTX-TV began broadcasting on April 3, 1955. Its arrival came sooner than the original owner of KANG-TV, Clyde L. Weatherby, had expected. Weatherby had sold KANG-TV to the Texas Broadcasting Company, owned by one of his college classmates: Lady Bird Johnson, wife of then-senator Lyndon B. Johnson. Due to what KWTX termed monopolistic behavior by Texas Broadcasting, KWTX-TV was an independent station devoid of network programming. KWTX officials also challenged a power increase proposed by Texas Broadcasting's KTBC-TV in Austin. Despite this, KWTX-TV affiliated with ABC in May. M. N. "Buddy" Bostick, KWTX-TV's general manager, later revealed that CBS had previously assured channel 10 of an affiliation but broke that vow in order to remain affiliated with the Johnson-owned KANG-TV.

On December 24, 1955, Bostick and KANG-TV general manager J. C. Kellam jointly announced that the stations would merge as KWTX-TV on channel 10. The KWTX Broadcasting Company acquired all of KANG's assets save the license and sold a minority stake to KANG's owners. At midnight on December 31, 1955, KANG-TV ceased broadcasting; KWTX-TV inherited KANG's CBS affiliation, while KANG-TV's owners acquired a 30 percent stake in KWTX-TV, and Kellam and Lady Bird Johnson joined the KWTX board.

KWTX complemented network programming with an extensive lineup of live telecasts in its early years. The Uncle Elihu Show was KWTX-TV's children's program, an hour-long early evening series that aired between 1955 and 1959 and featured a studio audience. In 1955, KWTX-TV was the first television station to broadcast a murder trial; it signed on three hours earlier than usual, at 9 a.m., with coverage of the trial of Harry Washburn, who was accused of killing his mother-in-law in San Angelo. District Judge D. W. Bartlett praised the station's crew for its unobtrusiveness, but Texas law was later changed to prohibit such coverage. Ten Acres, a farm news segment hosted by Johnny Watkins, was a noontime feature on KWTX-TV from 1955 until 1980.

=== Regional expansion ===
Sometimes you do things for defensive reasons and sometimes for offensive reasons. When they both work, you've got a winner. And we had a winner.

— Buddy Bostick, on why KBTX-TV was launched

The FCC had originally allocated channel 3 for non-commercial use at College Station, 90 miles (140 km) south of Waco. Bostick fretted that the channel could eventually serve as commercial competition to KWTX-TV and knew that Texas A&M University had no plans for an educational station. KWTX and A&M successfully petitioned the FCC to reallocate the channel for commercial use in Bryan or College Station in 1956.

In 1962, after examining concerns of possible signal overlap to KTBC-TV, the FCC permitted KWTX-TV to upgrade its transmitter facility. This permitted construction of a 1,080 feet (330 m) tower 8 miles (13 km) south of Waco. This facility, in turn, was replaced in 1979 with a new, 1,679-foot (512 m) tower at Moody.

=== Affiliation and studio changes ===
Though KWTX–KBTX had long been affiliated with CBS and ABC, in 1977 the stations switched primary affiliations to ABC. At the time, the network had ascended into first place in the national ratings and was signing up new primary affiliates nationwide. Bostick downplayed the importance of the change in primary affiliation as merely an emphasis on ABC over CBS, noting that the station had already been airing more ABC programming than CBS programming for the preceding year. KWTX and KBTX mixed the two networks' prime time shows; they broadcast ABC's Good Morning America and Nightline and, until ABC made changes to the distribution of World News Tonight in 1982, aired their network newscasts back-to-back. KWTX used the time freed up to debut its own 5 p.m. local newscast. The two stations resumed sole CBS affiliation on September 1, 1983, with a new local TV station, KXXV (channel 25), on the horizon.

By the early 1980s, KWTX radio and television were outgrowing the Bosque Boulevard studio. Some of the stations' more than 100 full-time employees were working out of desks in the hallway. In 1984, KWTX and American National Bank—a bank organized by Bostick and W. W. Callan—announced plans for a $12 million office complex known as American National Bank Plaza to contain new KWTX radio and television studios. Ground was broken in 1985, and the new facility opened in February 1987. The new building gave the KWTX stations nearly three times as much space.

In 1996, the KWTX radio stations were separated from channel 10 when they were sold to GulfStar Communications. GulfStar was taking advantage of the deregulation brought on by the Telecommunications Act of 1996 to consolidate and become the leading radio cluster in the city.

=== Gray ownership ===
In 1998, shareholders in the Bostick stations—KWTX-TV, KBTX-TV, and KXII—began to consider a sale of the business because of costs to be incurred in converting the stations to digital telecasting. Hilton Howell, a director of Gray Communications Systems, Inc. (now Gray Media), had specific ties to KWTX; his grandfather had helped start the TV station, he was born in Waco, he had hung around it growing up though he never worked there, and he remained a shareholder. He recommended that Gray initiate talks to acquire the Bostick stations. In April 1999, the sale of KWTX-TV, KBTX-TV, and KXII to Gray for $139 million marked the firm's entry into Texas.

KWTX-TV acquired the rights to UPN programming in the Waco market on January 23, 2006, when it launched a 10.2 digital subchannel to carry the network and syndicated shows. Previously, UPN had been supplied by Time Warner Cable. UPN's merger with The WB to form The CW was announced the next day, and KWTX 10.2 was named the CW affiliate for the market.

In August 2018, the board of trustees of Central Texas College voted to sell the license of its public television station, KNCT (channel 46), to Gray to create a duopoly with KWTX-TV. Even though KNCT was operated non-commercially, its channel was not reserved. The sale was approved by the FCC on December 12 and completed on December 17. KNCT returned to the air on January 2, 2019, taking CW programming from KWTX-TV. Simultaneously, KWTX acquired the Telemundo affiliation for the market from KXXV as part of Gray's merger with Raycom Media, even though KXXV itself was divested.

== News operation ==
KWTX-TV traditionally was the leading television station in the Central Texas market, with KCEN-TV in a distant second-place position until the early 1980s. In the late 1970s, the station began expanding its coverage to the Temple, Killeen and Copperas Cove area in response to population growth. Even after the debut of KXXV in 1985, KWTX's newscast viewership tied or exceeded that of the other stations combined.

In late January 1990, KWTX news anchors Wendy Sheldon and Mike Reeder were reported missing, being found two days later in Albuquerque, New Mexico. The saga was salaciously dramatized on the syndicated tabloid newsmagazine A Current Affair, and both anchors resigned. Their resignations and others brought an end to a period in which KWTX-TV had finally experienced stability in its local news staff.

Just before the Mount Carmel raid on February 28, 1993, KWTX-TV cameraman James Peeler asked directions of David Jones, who was driving his postal truck, unaware that he was one of the Branch Davidians. Conflicting reports issued by the government and the Society of Professional Journalists differed as to whether this event accidentally alerted the cult to the impending raid. KWTX itself had been tipped off by Tommy Witherspoon, courts reporter for the Waco Tribune-Herald, who reportedly told one of the station's cameramen. Cameraman Dan Mulloney and reporter John McLemore followed agents into Mount Carmel and were some 50 yards (46 m) from the compound when gunfire began; a news vehicle, struck by gunfire, was used to carry agents out of the facility. A longstanding content-sharing agreement with WFAA-TV in Dallas gave that station a substantial lead on its competitors in reporting the news and KWTX-TV access to WFAA's news helicopter. Their footage was widely distributed—including on an ABC News special, after ABC got around an in-market embargo by purchasing rights to a news special produced by Australia's Nine Network.

By 1998, KWTX had reclaimed a commanding lead. At 6 p.m. on weeknights, the station had an audience share of 25 percent, exceeding the 19 percent combined of KCEN and KXXV. On January 22 of that year, reporter Kathryn Dettman was murdered in her apartment in Temple just before what would have been her last day with the station. KWTX continues to dominate the market; KWTX and KBTX were the two most-watched stations for news in the designated market area as of 2013.

=== Notable former on-air staff ===
- Mark Alford
- Aaron Chimbel – reporter
- Troy Dungan
- Betty Nguyen – reporter
- Pete Sousa – morning news anchor

== Technical information and subchannels ==
KWTX-TV broadcasts from a transmitter near Moody, Texas. The station's signal is multiplexed:

Subchannels of KWTX-TV
Subchannel	Res.	Short name	Programming
10.1	1080i	KWTX-DT	CBS
10.2	720p	T'Mundo	Telemundo
10.3	480i	MeTV	MeTV
10.4	480i	ION MYS	Ion Mystery
10.5	480i	Oxygen	Oxygen
10.6	480i	24/7 WX	KWTX Weather

Under Gray, KWTX was the first station in the Waco market to begin broadcasting a digital signal (on channel 53), on May 15, 2001. KWTX-TV joined all major network affiliates in Waco–Temple and shut down its analog signal on February 17, 2009, the original target digital television transition date. The digital signal moved from channel 53 to channel 10 for post-transition operations.
