= KWTX (AM) =

- Waco, Texas; United States
- Broadcast area: Waco metropolitan area
- Frequency: 1230 kHz
- Branding: NewsTalk 1230

Programming
- Format: Conservative talk
- Network: Fox News Radio
- Affiliations: Premiere Networks; Compass Media Networks

Ownership
- Owner: iHeartMedia; (iHM Licenses, LLC)
- Sister stations: KBGO; KBRQ; KIIZ-FM; KLFX; KWTX-FM; WACO-FM

History
- First air date: May 1, 1946
- Call sign meaning: Waco, Texas

Technical information
- Licensing authority: FCC
- Facility ID: 33057
- Class: C
- Power: 1,000 watts (unlimited)
- Transmitter coordinates: 31°31′42″N 97°7′14″W

Links
- Public license information: Public file; LMS
- Webcast: Listen live (via iHeartRadio)
- Website: newstalk1230.iheart.com

KWTX (1230 AM) is a commercial radio station licensed to Waco, Texas, United States, serving the Waco metropolitan area. Owned by iHeartMedia, the station carries a conservative talk format consisting largely of nationally syndicated programs. Studios are located on Texas Highway 6 in Waco, while the transmitter is sited at Primrose Drive and South 18th Street, south of Baylor University in Waco.

== History ==
KWTX first signed on the air on May 1, 1946, as the second radio station in Waco, and originally broadcast with 250 watts. KWTX was a network affiliate of the Mutual Broadcasting System.

In 1955, it added a television station, KWTX-TV (channel 10). In 1970, it signed on an FM radio station, KWTX-FM 97.5. Through the 1970s and 1980s, KWTX aired a full service radio format, including middle of the road (MOR) music, news and sports. On March 2, 1981, KWTX switched to a country format. On February 27, 1987, KWTX began carrying Satellite Music Network's adult standards format full-time.

On August 10, 1998, KWTX changed its format to children's radio, featuring programming from Radio Disney. The Disney format lasted nearly three years.

In June 2000, the station was acquired by Capstar, a forerunner to current owner iHeartMedia. On July 15, 2001, KWTX dropped Radio Disney and switched formats back to talk radio, with hourly news supplied by ABC News Radio. In 2005, the network was changed to Fox News Radio.
