= KCLE =

Coordinates: 32°34′43.5″N 97°16′51.1″W

- Burleson, Texas; United States
- Broadcast area: Dallas–Fort Worth metroplex
- Frequency: 1460 kHz
- Branding: The Message

Programming
- Format: Christian radio

Ownership
- Owner: Grace Media Partners, LLC
- Operator: Wilkins Radio Network

History
- First air date: 1922; 104 years ago (as WJAD in Waco, Texas)
- Former call signs: WJAD (1922–1930); WACO (1930–1996); KKTK (1996–2002); KTFW (2002–2005); KHFX (2005–2008)
- Call sign meaning: Cleburne, Texas, city of license when it was on 1140 kHz and earlier on 1120

Technical information
- Licensing authority: FCC
- Facility ID: 59263
- Class: B
- Power: 11,000 watts day; 700 watts night
- Translators: 93.1 K226BM (Cleburne); 95.7 K239CC (Burleson)

Links
- Public license information: Public file; LMS
- Webcast: Listen Live
- Website: KCLE Online

KCLE (1460 AM) is a commercial radio station licensed to Burleson, Texas, which serves the Dallas–Fort Worth metroplex. It is owned by Grace Media Partners, LLC, operated by Wilkins Radio Network, and broadcasts a Christian radio format. First licensed in July 1922, it is one of Texas' oldest radio stations.

KCLE programming is also heard on two FM translator stations: 93.1 K226BM in Cleburne and 95.7 K239CC in Burleson.

== History ==
=== WJAD and WACO Waco ===
KCLE was first licensed, with the sequentially assigned call letters of WJAD, to Jackson's Radio Engineering Laboratories in Waco, Texas, on July 21, 1922. The call letters were changed to WACO in February 1930. WACO was owned by three men, Frank P. Jackson, J. M. Gilliam, and Orville Bullington of Wichita Falls, the 1932 Republican gubernatorial nominee.

In 1962, it put an FM station on the air, 99.9 WACO-FM. The two stations simulcast a country music format. In the late 1970s and for most of the 1980s, the FM station switched to an easy listening music format as KHOO, while the AM station continued as country outlet WACO. WACO went to a news/talk format in August 1988, but returned to a primarily country format the following spring, though some talk shows remained. The FM station came back to country music in 1990, returning to its WACO-FM call sign. The AM switched to a sports format on January 2, 1995, and subsequently changed call letters to KKTK as "The Ticket" on June 24, 1996.

=== KTFW, KHFX and KCLE ===
In 2002, Lee Glascow sold the station for $405,000. It became a joint venture between M&M Broadcasters (80%) and George Marti (20%). The owners changed the station’s call sign to KTFW as a simulcast of its sister station 92.1 KTFW-FM in Glen Rose, Texas, which broadcast a country format.

In 2005, the station and its city of license were moved to Burleson, Texas, in the larger Dallas-Fort Worth radio market. The call letters were switched to KHFX. It began carrying Fox Sports Radio programming after the network's previous Dallas affiliate, 1190 KFXR, switched to classic country music. George Marti sold the remaining shares to M&M that same year. Eventually the station switched its call letters to KCLE, flipping its format to classic country music.

On April 14, 2009, KCLE lost its fight with the Federal Communications Commission (FCC) to keep AM 1480 KNIT in Dallas (now KNGO) from increasing its daytime power to 50,000 watts. KCLE feared the high powered station, only 20 kHz away, would drown out KCLE for some listeners close to KNIT's transmitter.

=== ESPN sports ===
It was announced on July 23, 2013, that KCLE would jettison its classic country format and become a second affiliate of ESPN Radio in the Dallas/Fort Worth area by June 24. The station's schedule would complement ESPN-owned KESN, which served the Metroplex from its tower north of Dallas, while KCLE's transmitter is south of Fort Worth.

While KESN carried Mike & Mike in the Morning and the first two hours of The Herd with Colin Cowherd from ESPN Radio, KCLE aired a local sports talk morning show from 6 to 9 a.m. and continued its long-running "DFW Tradefair" tradio program from 9 to 11 a.m. After KESN shifted to local sports programming at 11 a.m., KCLE picked up ESPN network programming.

=== Vietnamese programming ===
On February 25, 2015, Intelli, LLC closed on its purchase of KCLE from M&M Broadcasters for $1.6 million.

KCLE went off the air in July 2016. The station returned to the air in late June 2017, airing Vietnamese music and talk.
