= Moody, Texas =

- City
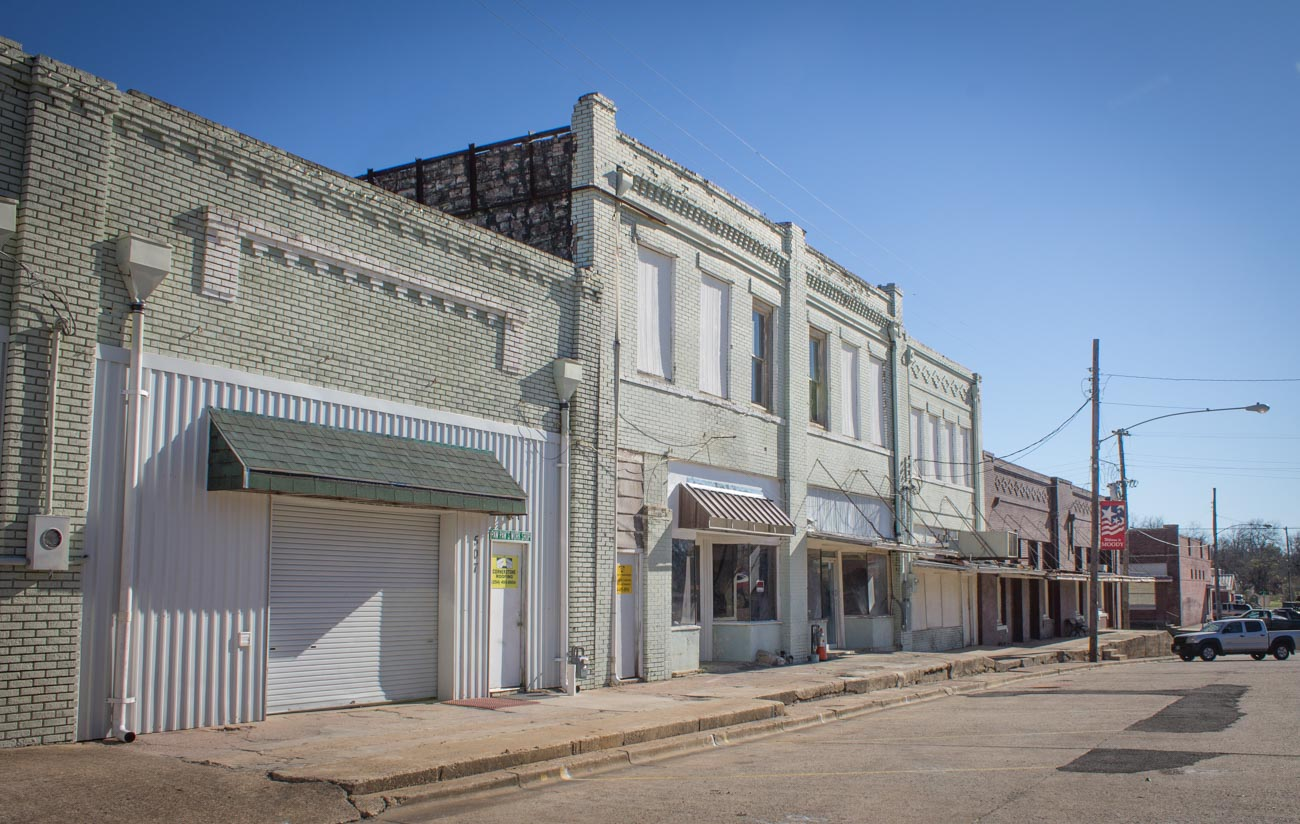
- Downtown Moody

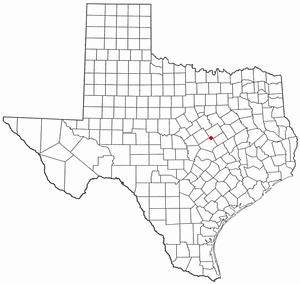
- Location of Moody, Texas

- Coordinates: 31°18′24″N 97°21′32″W
- Country: United States
- State: Texas
- County: McLennan

Area
  - Total: 0.96 sq mi (2.49 km^{2})
  - Land: 0.96 sq mi (2.49 km^{2})
  - Water: 0 sq mi (0.00 km^{2})
- Elevation: 774 ft (236 m)

Population (2020)
  - Total: 1,376
  - Density: 1,478/sq mi (570.5/km^{2})
- Time zone: UTC-6 (Central (CST))
  - Summer (DST): UTC-5 (CDT)
- ZIP code: 76557
- Area code: 254
- FIPS code: 48-49200
- GNIS feature ID: 2411153
- Website: moodytx.gov

Moody is a city in McLennan County, Texas, United States. The population was 1,376 at the 2020 census. It is part of the Waco Metropolitan Statistical Area.

== Geography ==
According to the United States Census Bureau, the city has a total area of 0.9 square miles (2.3 km^{2}), all land.

== Demographics ==
Historical population
Census	Pop.	Note	%±
1890	432		—
1910	983		—
1920	1,106		12.5%
1930	1,014		−8.3%
1940	931		−8.2%
1950	1,084		16.4%
1960	1,074		−0.9%
1970	1,286		19.7%
1980	1,385		7.7%
1990	1,329		−4.0%
2000	1,400		5.3%
2010	1,371		−2.1%
2020	1,376		0.4%
U.S. Decennial Census

=== 2020 census ===
As of the 2020 census, there were 1,376 people living in 502 households, including 340 families, in the city, and the median age was 35.9 years; 26.2% of residents were under the age of 18 and 14.8% were 65 years of age or older. For every 100 females there were 89.0 males, and for every 100 females age 18 and over there were 89.0 males age 18 and over.

Of the 502 households, 37.1% had children under the age of 18 living in them, 47.0% were married-couple households, 16.3% were households with a male householder and no spouse or partner present, and 28.1% were households with a female householder and no spouse or partner present. About 25.5% of all households were made up of individuals and 11.0% had someone living alone who was 65 years of age or older.

There were 575 housing units, of which 12.7% were vacant. The homeowner vacancy rate was 5.1% and the rental vacancy rate was 7.5%.

0.0% of residents lived in urban areas, while 100.0% lived in rural areas.

Racial composition as of the 2020 census
Race	Number	Percent
White	987	71.7%
Black or African American	92	6.7%
American Indian and Alaska Native	3	0.2%
Asian	3	0.2%
Native Hawaiian and Other Pacific Islander	0	0.0%
Some other race	103	7.5%
Two or more races	188	13.7%
Hispanic or Latino (of any race)	355	25.8%

=== 2000 census ===
As of the census of 2000, there were 1,400 people, 529 households, and 369 families residing in the city. The population density was 1,645.7 inhabitants per square mile (635.4/km^{2}). There were 616 housing units at an average density of 724.1 per square mile (279.6/km^{2}). The racial makeup of the city was 82.71% White, 8.79% African American, 0.36% Native American, 0.14% Pacific Islander, 6.57% from other races, and 1.43% from two or more races. Hispanic or Latino of any race were 14.93% of the population.

There were 529 households, out of which 33.5% had children under the age of 18 living with them, 54.4% were married couples living together, 12.9% had a female householder with no husband present, and 30.2% were non-families. 27.4% of all households were made up of individuals, and 16.3% had someone living alone who was 65 years of age or older. The average household size was 2.57 and the average family size was 3.14.

In the city, the population was spread out, with 27.2% under the age of 18, 8.6% from 18 to 24, 25.8% from 25 to 44, 20.5% from 45 to 64, and 17.9% who were 65 years of age or older. The median age was 36 years. For every 100 females, there were 85.9 males. For every 100 females age 18 and over, there were 80.4 males.

The median income for a household in the city was $26,974, and the median income for a family was $34,271. Males had a median income of $28,828 versus $21,204 for females. The per capita income for the city was $13,048. About 16.3% of families and 18.2% of the population were below the poverty line, including 22.1% of those under age 18 and 18.7% of those age 65 or over.

== Education ==
The City of Moody is served by the Moody Independent School District.
