= Armstrong, Bell County, Texas =

Unincorporated community in Texas, US

Armstrong
- Unincorporated community
- Location in Texas
- Coordinates: 30.98152900°N 97.44507800°W
- Country: United States
- State: Texas
- County: Bell

Armstrong is an unincorporated community in Bell County, Texas, United States.

Situated on Farm to Market Road 1123, it was settled in the late 1800s. An early settler included John T. Dulaney, who built most structures in the town. When nearby Summers Mill and Elm Grove consolidated school districts in 1915, the Armstrong School District—named for trustee C. I. Armstrong, the former the namesake of the town—was created in the community, and on May 25, 1916, the school in Armstrong finished construction. Though, the Armstrong district merged into the Belton, Holland and Salado Independent School Districts, and the schoolhouse was repurposed into a community center. As of 2000, it had 25 residents.
