= Ocker, Texas =

- Ghost town
- Location within Texas Location within the United States
- Coordinates: 31°4′15″N 97°8′37″W
- Country: United States
- State: Texas
- County: Bell
- Elevation: 535 ft (163 m)
- Time zone: UTC-6 (Central (CST))
  - Summer (DST): UTC-5 (CDT)
- Area code: 254
- GNIS feature ID: 1380283

Ocker is a ghost town in Bell County, in the U.S. state of Texas. It is located within the Killeen-Temple-Fort Hood metropolitan area.

== Geography ==
Ocker was located at the intersection of State Highways 53 and 320, 11 mi (18 km) east of Temple in eastern Bell County.
