= Joe Lee, Texas =

- Unincorporated community
- Location within Texas Location within the United States
- Coordinates: 30°54′39″N 97°16′51″W
- Country: United States
- State: Texas
- County: Bell
- Elevation: 472 ft (144 m)
- Time zone: UTC-6 (Central (CST))
  - Summer (DST): UTC-5 (CDT)
- Area code: 254
- GNIS feature ID: 2034776

Joe Lee is an unincorporated community in Bell County, in the U.S. state of Texas. According to the Handbook of Texas, only two people lived in the community in 2000. It is located within the Killeen-Temple-Fort Hood metropolitan area.

== History ==
Its population was 2 in 1990 and 2000. The cemeteries are maintained by descendants of the original settlers.

== Geography ==
Joe Lee is located north of the Little River, 4 mi (6.4 km) southwest of Rogers in southeastern Bell County, on Farm to Market Road 2184 near the Milam County line. Sunshine Road passes through the community.

== Education ==
Joe Lee joined the Rogers Independent School District in 1958. It was built around the 1870s and one of the two teachers was W.C. Sypert. Today, the community continues to be served by the Rogers ISD.
