= Ratibor, Texas =

- Community
- Location within Texas Location within the United States
- Coordinates: 31°05′15″N 97°12′45″W
- Country: United States
- Elevation: 502 ft (153 m)

Population (2000)
  - Total: 10
- Time zone: UTC-6 (Central (CST))
  - Summer (DST): UTC-5 (CDT)
- ZIP code: 76501
- Area code: 254
- GNIS feature ID: 1380413

Ratibor is an unincorporated community in eastern Bell County, Texas, United States, with a population of approximately 10 according to the Handbook of Texas in 2000. It is located within the Killeen-Temple-Fort Hood metropolitan area.

== History ==
The town, formed about 1900, is named for Ratiboř in the Zlín Region of Moravia, Czech Republic. In 1855, Ratiboř was part of the Austrian Empire. The community had 10 residents and four businesses in 1933, which grew to 80 in 1940, dropped to 20 in 1964, and then stopped at 10 from 1990 through 2000.

== Geography ==
Ratibor is located on the Ratibor Branch, just west of the intersection of Farm to Market Roads 2086 and 2904, 7 mi (11 km) east of Temple in eastern Bell County.

== Education ==
In 1903, Ratibor had a school named Lost Prairie School that had 39 students and one teacher. Today, the community is served by the Rogers Independent School District.
