= Rogers High School (Rogers, Texas) =

Location
- 505 High Street; Rogers, Bell County, Texas 76569; United States; 30°55′46″N 97°13′48″W

Information
- School type: Public, high school
- Locale: Rural: Distant
- School district: Rogers ISD
- NCES School ID: 483771004225
- Principal: Lee Vi Moses
- Staff: 25.63 (on an FTE basis)
- Grades: 9–12
- Enrollment: 280 (2023–2024)
- Student to teacher ratio: 10.82
- Colors: Black & Gold
- Athletics conference: UIL Class 3A
- Mascot: Eagle
- Website: Rogers High School

Rogers High School is a public high school located in Rogers, Texas and classified as a 3A school by the University Interscholastic League. It is part of the Rogers Independent School District located in southeastern Bell County. During 2022–2023, Rogers High School had an enrollment of 280 students and a student to teacher ratio of 10.82. The school received an overall rating of "B" from the Texas Education Agency for the 2024–2025 school year.

== Athletics ==
The Rogers Eagles compete in:

- Baseball
- Basketball
- Cross Country
- Football
- Golf
- Powerlifting
- Softball
- Tennis
- Track and Field
- Volleyball

== State titles ==
Team

- Baseball -
  - 2007(2A), 2010(2A)
- One-Act Play -
  - 2002(2A), 2005(2A), 2008(2A), 2009(2A), 2012(2A), 2013(2A)

Individual

- Boys Track – 1600 Meter Run
  - 2007(2A)

=== State finalists ===
- Girls Basketball –
  - 1986(2A)
- Football –
  - 1998(2A)
- One-Act Play
  - 1976(2A), 1978(2A), 1979 (2A), 2003(2A), 2004(2A), 2011(2A), 2015(3A)

== Notable alumni ==
- Jonathan Bane, football player
- Taylor Jungmann, Major League Baseball pitcher
