= Texas State Highway 320 =

State highway in Texas

State Highway 320
- SH 320, highlighted in red

Route information
- Maintained by TxDOT
- Length: 18.792 mi (30.243 km)
- Existed: 1939–present

Major junctions
- South end: SH 53 near Zabcikville
- US 77 in Lott
- North end: SH 7 near Marlin

Location
- Country: United States
- State: Texas

Highway system
- Highways in Texas; Interstate; US; State; Former; Toll; Loops; Spurs; FM/RM; Park; Rec
← SH 319	→ SH 321

State Highway 320 (SH 320) is a short Texas state highway that runs from SH 53 near Zabcikville north to SH 7 west of Marlin. This route was designated on October 24, 1939.

== Route description ==
SH 320 begins at a junction with SH 53. It heads northeast from this junction to an intersection with Farm to Market Road 3369. The highway continues to the northeast to an intersection with Farm to Market Road 431. Heading towards the northeast, the highway continues to a junction with US 77. The highway continues to the northeast to an intersection with Farm to Market Road 2027 in Lott. SH 320 reaches its northern terminus at SH 7.

== Junction list ==
County	Location	mi	km	Destinations	Notes
Bell		0.0	0.0	SH 53 – Temple, Rosebud	
Bell		0.5	0.80	FM 2904 west – Ratibor	
Bell		1.0	1.6	FM 3369 west – Oenaville	
Falls		4.7	7.6	FM 431 east – Travis	
Falls	Lott	11.9	19.2	US 77 – Waco, Cameron	
Falls		17.5	28.2	FM 2027 south – Cedar Springs	
Falls		18.8	30.3	SH 7 – Chilton, Marlin	
1.000 mi = 1.609 km; 1.000 km = 0.621 mi
