= Cedar Valley, Bell County, Texas =

- Unincorporated community
- Location within Texas Location within the United States
- Coordinates: 30°54′21″N 97°40′39″W
- Country: United States
- State: Texas
- County: Bell
- Elevation: 840 ft (260 m)
- Time zone: UTC-6 (Central (CST))
  - Summer (DST): UTC-5 (CDT)
- Area code: 254
- GNIS feature ID: 2034696

Cedar Valley is an unincorporated community in Bell County, in the U.S. state of Texas. According to the Handbook of Texas, only four people lived in the community in 2000. It is located within the Killeen-Temple-Fort Hood metropolitan area.

== History ==
Cedar Valley had several churches. It had only two churches, several scattered homes, and an air strip in 1990 and had a population of only four through 2000.

== Geography ==
Cedar Valley is located on Farm to Market Road 2843, 13 mi (21 km) southeast of Killeen in southwestern Bell County.

== Education ==
In 1903, Cedar Valley had a school that served 44 students and remained in operation until 1948. Today, the community is served by the Salado Independent School District.
