= Oscar, Texas =

- Unincorporated community
- Location within Texas Location within the United States
- Coordinates: 31°03′03″N 97°15′44″W
- Country: United States
- State: Texas
- County: Bell
- Elevation: 502 ft (153 m)
- Time zone: UTC-6 (Central (CST))
  - Summer (DST): UTC-5 (CDT)
- Area code: 254
- GNIS feature ID: 1380314

Oscar is an unincorporated community in Bell County, in the U.S. state of Texas. According to the Handbook of Texas, the community had a population of 40 in 2000. It is located within the Killeen-Temple-Fort Hood metropolitan area.

== History ==
The community first came into existence when several Czech families settled in the area in the late 19th century. A post office was established at Oscar in 1892 and remained in operation until 1904. Oscar had 115 residents that were served by a cotton gin, a hotel, a general store, a blacksmith, and a barber in 1896. It plunged to 40 residents alongside two businesses in 1946. Both businesses closed thereafter, and its population was reported as 40 from 1990 through 2000.

== Geography ==
Oscar is located on Little Elm Creek and Farm to Market Road 3117, 6 mi (9.7 km) east of Temple in eastern Bell County.

== Education ==
Oscar had its own school in 1946. Today, the community is served by the Rogers Independent School District.
