= Owl Creek, Texas =

- Unincorporated community
- Location within Texas Location within the United States
- Coordinates: 31°13′39″N 97°30′42″W
- Country: United States
- State: Texas
- County: Bell
- Elevation: 666 ft (203 m)
- Time zone: UTC-6 (Central (CST))
  - Summer (DST): UTC-5 (CDT)
- Area code: 254
- GNIS feature ID: 1380318

Owl Creek is an unincorporated community in Bell County, in the U.S. state of Texas. According to the Handbook of Texas, the community had a population of 45 in 2000. It is located within the Killeen-Temple-Fort Hood metropolitan area.

== History ==
Owl Creek was named for a nearby creek of the same name and was first settled as early as the 1850s. There were no population estimates recorded for the town until 1990, when it had a population of 45 residents.

== Geography ==
Owl Creek is located 14 mi (23 km) northwest of Temple off Texas State Highway 36 in northern Bell County.

== Education ==
Owl Creek had its own school district by the 1890s, which was in operation until some time in the early 1900s. Today, the community is served by the Belton Independent School District.
