= Stampede, Texas =

- Unincorporated community
- Location within Texas Location within the United States
- Coordinates: 31°16′56″N 97°24′14″W
- Country: United States
- State: Texas
- County: Bell
- Elevation: 682 ft (208 m)
- Time zone: UTC-6 (Central (CST))
  - Summer (DST): UTC-5 (CDT)
- Area code: 254
- GNIS feature ID: 1380598

Stampede is an unincorporated community in Bell County, in the U.S. state of Texas. According to the Handbook of Texas, the community had a population of 10 in 2000. It is located within the Killeen-Temple-Fort Hood metropolitan area.

== History ==
A post office was established at Stampede in 1883 and remained in operation until 1901. At its height in 1933, it had one business and a population of sixty two.

Historical population
Year	Pop.	±%
1933	62	—
1949	30	−51.6%
1964	10	−66.7%
2000	10	+0.0%

== Geography ==
Stampede is located on Stampede Creek and Farm to Market Road 2601, 12 mi (19 km) northwest of Temple in northern Bell County. A town called Pidcoke is located 6 mi (9.7 km) northeast of the community.

== Education ==
In 1903, Stampede had a school with 59 students enrolled and continued to operate as of 1949. Today, the community is served by the Moody Independent School District.
