= Leedale, Texas =

- Unincorporated community
- Location within Texas Location within the United States
- Coordinates: 30°59′12″N 97°11′53″W
- Country: United States
- State: Texas
- County: Bell
- Elevation: 466 ft (142 m)
- Time zone: UTC-6 (Central (CST))
  - Summer (DST): UTC-5 (CDT)
- Area code: 254
- GNIS feature ID: 1380073

Leedale is an unincorporated community in Bell County, in the U.S. state of Texas. According to the Handbook of Texas, the community had a population of 16 in 2000. It is located within the Killeen-Temple-Fort Hood metropolitan area.

== History ==
Leedale was settled in the early 1900s near the neighbouring community of Gindale. There was a store, a gas station, and a cotton gin in the community in 1948. In 1964 Leedale had a population of 20 and had reportedly absorbed Gindale. Its population was 16 from 1990 through 2000.

== Geography ==
Leedale is located on Farm to Market Road 437 on the Whatley Branch of South Elm Creek, 16 mi (26 km) east of Belton in southeastern Bell County.

== Education ==
Leedale was described as a school community in the early 1900s. Today, the community is served by the Rogers Independent School District.
