= Edgeworth, Texas =

- Unincorporated community
- Location within Texas Location within the United States
- Coordinates: 30°57′06″N 97°08′26″W
- Country: United States
- State: Texas
- County: Bell
- Elevation: 423 ft (129 m)
- Time zone: UTC-6 (Central (CST))
  - Summer (DST): UTC-5 (CDT)
- Area code: 254
- GNIS feature ID: 1379702

Edgeworth is an unincorporated community in Bell County, in the U.S. state of Texas. According to the Handbook of Texas, the community had a population of 20 in 2000. It is located within the Killeen-Temple-Fort Hood metropolitan area.

== History ==
Edgeworth was established sometime before the year 1900. Its population dropped to 20 by 1964, and 15 by 2015. It is a ghost town.

== Geography ==
Edgeworth is located on South Elm Creek and Farm to Market Road 2184, 14 mi (23 km) southeast of Temple in southeastern Bell County, near the Milam County line.

== Education ==
Today, the community is served by the Rogers Independent School District.
