= Taylor Jungmann =

American baseball player (born 1989)

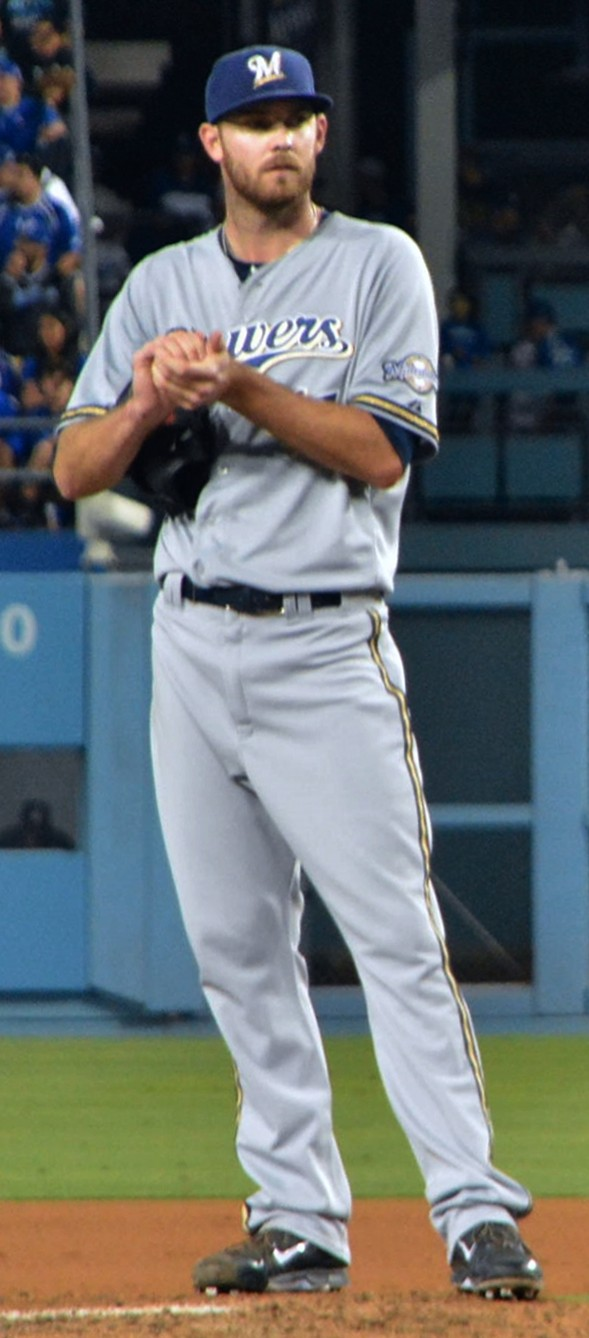
- Jungmann with the Milwaukee Brewers in 2015
- Pitcher
- Born: December 18, 1989 (age 36); Temple, Texas, U.S.
- Batted: Right Threw: Right

Professional debut
- MLB: June 9, 2015, for the Milwaukee Brewers
- NPB: July 1, 2018, for the Yomiuri Giants

Last appearance
- MLB: April 5, 2017, for the Milwaukee Brewers
- NPB: August 17, 2019, for the Yomiuri Giants

MLB statistics
- Win–loss record: 9–13
- Earned run average: 4.54
- Strikeouts: 126

NPB statistics
- Win–loss record: 6–5
- Earned run average: 4.86
- Strikeouts: 53
- Stats at Baseball Reference

Teams
- Milwaukee Brewers (2015–2017); Yomiuri Giants (2018–2019)

Career highlights and awards
- Dick Howser Trophy (2011)

Taylor Heath Jungmann (born December 18, 1989) is an American former professional baseball pitcher. He played in Major League Baseball (MLB) for the Milwaukee Brewers and for the Yomiuri Giants of Nippon Professional Baseball (NPB). Prior to playing professionally, Jungmann played college baseball for the Texas Longhorns, where he was a consensus All-American and won the Dick Howser Trophy.

== Career ==
=== Amateur career ===
The son of Leland Jungmann and the former Sharon Burton of Zabcikville in Bell County, Texas Jungmann attended Rogers High School in Rogers, Texas. The Rogers baseball team won the Texas 2A State Championship in 2007. He also played on the Rogers basketball team, and in the 2006-07 season he blocked 266 shots, which is tied for 23rd most in a single season in U.S. high school sports history. He transferred to Georgetown High School in Georgetown, Texas, where he played his senior year in 2008.

After high school, Jungmann enrolled at the University of Texas at Austin, at which he participated in college baseball for the Texas Longhorns. In 2009, Jungmann pitched a complete game against the Louisiana State Tigers in the best-of-three final round of the 2009 College World Series. In 2011, he won the Dick Howser Trophy as the best collegiate baseball player. He finished his career with the Longhorns with a 32–9 win–loss record, a 1.85 earned run average (ERA), and 356 strikeouts in 45 games started.

=== Milwaukee Brewers ===
The Milwaukee Brewers selected Jungmann in the first round, with the 12th overall selection, of the 2011 Major League Baseball (MLB) Draft. He signed with the Brewers, receiving a $2.525 million signing bonus. Jungmann pitched for the Brevard County Manatees of the Class A-Advanced Florida State League in 2012, where he had a 3.53 ERA, and for the Huntsville Stars of the Class AA Southern League in 2013, where he pitched to a 4.33 ERA.

In 2014, Jungmann began the season with Huntsville, and was named a Southern League All-Star. He also played for the Nashville Sounds of the Class AAA Pacific Coast League (PCL). He finished the season with a 12–10 win–loss record, a 3.57 ERA, and 147 strikeouts in 153 2/3 innings. The Brewers added him to their 40-man roster to protect him from being chosen in the Rule 5 draft on November 20, 2014.

Jungmann began the 2015 season with the Colorado Springs Sky Sox of the PCL. The Brewers promoted Jungmann to the major leagues to make his MLB debut on June 9. On July 11, 2015, Jungmann became the first Brewers pitcher in franchise history to throw a complete game at Dodger Stadium. After posting a 3.77 ERA in his rookie season, Jungmann struggled to recapture that form, with a combined ERA of 7.90 in 9 MLB games (6 starts) from 2016 through 2017. He was released on January 10, 2018, to pursue an opportunity in Japan.

=== Yomiuri Giants ===
On January 16, 2018, Jungmann signed with the Yomiuri Giants of Nippon Professional Baseball (NPB) for the 2018 season.

On November 14, 2018, he re-signed with the Giants for the 2019 season.

On December 2, 2019, he become a free agent.

=== Texas Rangers ===
On February 11, 2020, Jungmann signed a minor league deal with the Texas Rangers. He was released on June 1, 2020.

=== Sugar Land Skeeters ===
In July 2020, Jungmann signed on to play for the Sugar Land Skeeters of the Constellation Energy League (a makeshift 4-team independent league created as a result of the COVID-19 pandemic) for the 2020 season. He became a free agent following the season. He appeared in 8 games (6 starts) throwing 26.2 innings going 1-0 with a 3.38 ERA and 30 strikeouts.

== Scouting report ==
Jungmann brandishes a four pitch repertoire. At 6-foot-6, his four-seam fastball is thrown around 92-94 MPH and on a downward plane, inducing many ground balls. He also features a sinker in the upper-80s, also to induce ground balls, as well as to mask the velocity of his four-seamer. His curveball is likely his best pitch, frequently causing many swings-and-misses. Sitting in the upper-70s, the curveball has a hard, late break as it reaches the batter, and his mechanics are consistent across all of his pitches, making any off-speed offerings more deceptive. His curveball has been referred to by some as a slurve, due to its late break and decent velocity. He also features a changeup in the lower-80s with good sinking movement, though he doesn't throw it very often. Despite relying heavily on inducing ground balls, his pitches have enough velocity, movement, and deceptiveness to make him an effective strikeout pitcher.
