= Airville (disambiguation) =

Airville is a historic home near Gloucester, Virginia.

Airville may also refer to:

- Airville, Queensland, a rural locality in Australia
- Airville, Pennsylvania, an unincorporated community
- Airville, Texas, an unincorporated community
- Airville station, now Expo/La Brea station, on the E Line of the Los Angeles Metro Rail

== See also ==
- Aireville Park, a park in Skipton, North Yorkshire, England
