= Stringtown, Bell County, Texas =

- Ghost town
- Location within Texas Location within the United States
- Coordinates: 31°1′26″N 97°14′28″W
- Country: United States
- State: Texas
- County: Bell
- Elevation: 551 ft (168 m)
- Time zone: UTC-6 (Central (CST))
  - Summer (DST): UTC-5 (CDT)
- Area code: 254
- GNIS feature ID: 1380619

Stringtown is a ghost town in Bell County, in the U.S. state of Texas. It is located within the Killeen-Temple-Fort Hood metropolitan area.

== History ==
A post office named String was established in 1901 and remained in operation until 1904. There were two businesses in 1931 with a church and several scattered houses in 1948. Its name was changed to Stringtown in 1964 and had Dyess Grove Church. The community had disappeared by 1988.

== Geography ==
Stringtown was located on Little Elm Creek, 9 mi (14 km) southeast of Temple in southeastern Bell County.

== Education ==
Dyess Grove School served 76 students in 1903 and remained in 1948. Today, Stringtown is located within the Rogers Independent School District.
