= Meeks, Texas =

- Unincorporated community
- Location within Texas Location within the United States
- Coordinates: 30°59′32″N 97°07′02″W
- Country: United States
- State: Texas
- County: Bell
- Elevation: 456 ft (139 m)
- Time zone: UTC-6 (Central (CST))
  - Summer (DST): UTC-5 (CDT)
- Area code: 254
- GNIS feature ID: 1380173

Meeks is an unincorporated community in Bell County, in the U.S. state of Texas. According to the Handbook of Texas, the community had a population of 15 in 2000. It is located within the Killeen-Temple-Fort Hood metropolitan area.

== Geography ==
Meeks is located 13 mi (21 km) east of Temple in eastern Bell County.

== Education ==
Today, the community is served by the Rogers Independent School District.
