= Texas State Highway Loop 363 =

State highway in Texas

State Highway Loop 363
- H.K. Dodgen Loop

Route information
- Maintained by TxDOT
- Length: 17.1 mi (27.5 km)
- Existed: 1962–present

Location
- Country: United States
- State: Texas

Highway system
- Highways in Texas; Interstate; US; State; Former; Toll; Loops; Spurs; FM/RM; Park; Rec
| ← Loop 362 | → Spur 364 |

Loop 363 (also known as the H.K. Dodgen Loop) is a state highway loop that encircles the Texas city of Temple in Central Texas.

== Route description ==
Loop 363 starts at Interstate 35 (I-35, General Bruce Drive) in the northern part of Temple. The highway travels in a southeast direction from here through sparsely populated areas of the city, traveling close to the eastern border of the city limits. Loop 363 has an interchange with State Highway 53 (SH 53, Adams Avenue) near Hector P. Garcia Elementary, before slightly turning in a southwest direction. Shortly after the interchange with SH 53, the highway has another interchange with Avenue H/Little Flock Road. Loop 363 junctions with U.S. Highway 190 (US 190)/SH 36 and SH 95, beginning an overlap with US 190/SH 36. At Spur 290 (1st Street), the highway runs as a freeway. The freeway section of Loop 363 runs through a heavily developed area in the city's southside. At the interchange with I-35, US 190 leaves the highway and 363 runs in a northward direction. Loop 363 then has interchanges with Farm to Market Road 2305 (FM 2305, Adams Avenue) and Airport Road. This is the western terminus of SH 53 and the end of the concurrency with SH 36 which continues to the northwest. After this interchange, the highway runs through sparsely populated areas of the city again. After the intersection with Industrial Boulevard, Loop 363 turns back to the east and runs by a Walmart distribution center and the main Wilsonart plant, before running back to I-35. The stretch between Airport Road and I-35 is under construction as of 2015, varying between freeway grade and unlimited divided highway. This is expected to be completed entirely at freeway grade in 2017.

== History ==
Loop 363 was designated on June 26, 1962, running from I-35 to US 190. On July 30, 1965, Loop 363 was extended northwestward from I-35 to SH 36. On January 31, 1967, Loop 363 was extended eastward concurrent with US 190 and northward to I-35. On February 25, 1987, Loop 363 was extended from I-35 to SH 36, completing its current route.

The common name of the highway is in honor of H.K. Dodgen, an officer deployed with the 36th Infantry Division in World War II.

== Junction list ==
Clockwise (CW) reads down and counterclockwise (CCW) reads up. The entire route is in Temple, Bell County.

| mi | km | Destinations | Notes |
|---|---|---|---|
| 0.0 | 0.0 | I-35 (General Bruce Drive) – Waco, Austin | |
| | | FM 438 east | |
| | | SH 53 – Seaton, Temple | Interchange |
| | | Avenue H, Little Flock Road | Interchange |
| | | US 190 east / SH 36 south / SH 95 south – Cameron, Holland | Interchange; CCW end of US 190/SH 36 overlap, future I-14 |
| | | Spur 290 north (1st Street) – Temple | CCW end of freeway; CCW Left Exit |
| | | 5th Street | |
| | | FM 1741 (31st Street) | CW exit is via the 5th Street exit, access to Scott & White Memorial Hospital |
| | | 57th Street, Oakdale Drive | |
| | | I-35 / US 190 west – Austin, Waco, Killeen | CW end of US 190 overlap, future I-14 |
| | | Wildflower Lane | CCW exit only |
| | | FM 2305 (Adams Avenue) – Belton Lake | |
| | | SH 36 north / SH 53 east – Gatesville, Temple | CW end of SH 36 overlap |
| | | Industrial Blvd | |
| | | Wendland Rd | |
| 17.1 | 27.5 | Lucius McCelvey Dr | CW End of Freeway |
1.000 mi = 1.609 km; 1.000 km = 0.621 mi: Concurrency terminus; Incomplete access
