= Youngsport, Texas =

- Unincorporated community
- Location within Texas Location within the United States
- Coordinates: 30°57′27″N 97°43′09″W
- Country: United States
- State: Texas
- County: Bell
- Elevation: 676 ft (206 m)
- Time zone: UTC-6 (Central (CST))
  - Summer (DST): UTC-5 (CDT)
- Area code: 254
- GNIS feature ID: 1372070

Youngsport is an unincorporated community in Bell County, in the U.S. state of Texas. According to the Handbook of Texas, the community had a population of 40 in 2000. It is located within the Killeen-Temple-Fort Hood metropolitan area.

== Geography ==
Youngsport is located on Farm to Market Road 2484 on the Lampasas River, 9 mi (14 km) south of Killeen in southwestern Bell County.

=== Climate ===
The climate in this area is characterized by hot, humid summers and generally mild to cool winters. According to the Köppen Climate Classification system, Youngsport has a humid subtropical climate, abbreviated "Cfa" on climate maps.

== Education ==
Today, the community is served by the Florence Independent School District.

== Notable person ==
- A.C. Greene's grandmother, Maude E. Cole, was born in Youngsport.
