= Union Grove, Bell County, Texas =

- Unincorporated community
- Location within Texas Location within the United States
- Coordinates: 31°00′02″N 97°36′07″W
- Country: United States
- State: Texas
- County: Bell
- Elevation: 699 ft (213 m)
- Time zone: UTC-6 (Central (CST))
  - Summer (DST): UTC-5 (CDT)
- Area code: 254
- GNIS feature ID: 1380695

Union Grove is an unincorporated community in Bell County, in the U.S. state of Texas. It is located within the Killeen-Temple-Fort Hood metropolitan area.

== History ==
The area in what is now known as Union Grove today was first settled in the early 1900s. During the 19030s it had a school and a business, but these had closed down by the 1990s. Four people lived in the community in 2000.

== Geography ==
Union Grove is located on Farm to Market Road 2484, 10 mi (16 km) southwest of Belton in west-central Bell County. Stillhouse Hollow Lake, on the Lampasas River, is located to the north of the community.

== Education ==
Union Grove had its own school in the 1930s, which may have closed by 1990. Today, the community is served by the Salado Independent School District.
