= Brookhaven, Texas =

- Ghost town
- Location within Texas Location within the United States
- Coordinates: 31°10′50″N 97°37′34″W
- Country: United States
- State: Texas
- County: Bell
- Elevation: 705 ft (215 m)
- Time zone: UTC-6 (Central (CST))
  - Summer (DST): UTC-5 (CDT)
- Area code: 254
- GNIS feature ID: 1379459

Brookhaven is a ghost town in Bell County, in the U.S. state of Texas. It is located within the Killeen-Temple-Fort Hood metropolitan area.

== History ==
A post office was established at Brookhaven in 1884 and remained in operation until 1913. It had a Masonic hall, a cotton gin, two general stores, two drugstores, and three churches for Baptist, Methodist, and Presbyterian congregations serving 75 residents in 1896. It dropped to 50 in the mid-1940s and had two businesses. It is now a part of the Fort Hood military base.

== Geography ==
Brookhaven was located on Oak Branch, 12 mi (19 km) northwest of Belton in northwestern Bell County.

== Education ==
Brookhaven's local school was built in the summer of 1882 and had 132 students enrolled in 1903. Today, Brookhaven is located within the Belton Independent School District.
