= Cyclone, Texas =

- Unincorporated community
- Location within Texas Location within the United States
- Coordinates: 31°01′40″N 97°09′03″W
- Country: United States
- State: Texas
- County: Bell
- Elevation: 459 ft (140 m)
- Time zone: UTC-6 (Central (CST))
  - Summer (DST): UTC-5 (CDT)
- Area code: 254
- GNIS feature ID: 1379626

Cyclone is an unincorporated community in Bell County, in the U.S. state of Texas. According to the Handbook of Texas, the community had a population of 45 in 2000. It is located within the Killeen-Temple-Fort Hood metropolitan area.

== Geography ==
Cyclone is located on Farm to Market Road 964 on the Cyclone Branch of Camp Creek, 11 mi (18 km) east of Temple in eastern Bell County. It is also located 19 mi (31 km) east of Belton, the county seat.

== Education ==
In 1903, Cyclone had a school with 42 students and one teacher. Today, the community is served by the Rogers Independent School District.
