= Moffat, Texas =

Moffat
- Unincorporated community
- Location within Texas Location within the United States
- Coordinates: 31°12′00″N 97°28′06″W
- Country: United States
- State: Texas
- County: Bell
- Established: Feb 1857
- Elevation: 692 ft (211 m)

Population (2000)
  - Total: 800
- Demonym: Moffadite
- Time zone: UTC-6 (CST)
  - Summer (DST): UTC-5 (CDT)
- ZIP Code: 76502
- Area code: 254
- GNIS feature ID: 1363026

Moffat is a small unincorporated community in Bell County, Texas, United States. It is part of the Killeen–Temple–Fort Hood Metropolitan Statistical Area.

== History ==
The community was founded by Amelia Vancil and Chauncey Warren Moffet in February 1857 (the town was named after them but, at some point, misspelled). A store, built by William Elisha Pruett in the late 1860s, served as the main social focus for area residents for several years. The community has been referred to by several names: Moffattown, Moffatsville, Mount Green, and Gandertown; Moffat was chosen as the official name when a post office opened there in 1872. By the mid-1880s, Moffat had three churches as well as a steam gristmill and cotton gin and a variety of other businesses to serve its 200 residents.

Cotton, cottonseed, and pecans were the area's principal shipments. The Moffat community reached a peak population in 1890 when it reported 350 residents. By 1900, its population had fallen to 147. The post office at Moffat was discontinued in 1918, and mail for the community was sent to Bland; the office opened again from February 1925 to December 1926, after which local mail was sent to Belton. From the late 1940s through the mid-1980s, the population of Moffat was reported at seventy-five to 100 residents. Moffat had 150 residents in 1990 and 2000.

A Texas historical marker has been placed on State Highway 36 10 miles (16 km) west of Temple, Texas, to commemorate the community.

Chauncey Warren Moffet came to the area from New York and was a union loyalist during the American Civil War and was also a Confederate States of America soldier. He mysteriously disappeared after returning to the community in 1868. The community was platted by D.F. and Calista Wiswell. A local cemetery is also in use today.

== Geography ==
Moffat is west of Texas State Highway 36 and 8 miles (13 km) northwest of Temple in northern Bell County.

== Education ==
By the mid-1880s, Moffat had a district school. The school at Moffat closed in 1974, and local students began attending classes within the Belton Independent School District.
