= Vilas, Texas =

- Unincorporated community
- Location within Texas Location within the United States
- Coordinates: 30°50′28″N 97°18′13″W
- Country: United States
- State: Texas
- County: Bell
- Elevation: 512 ft (156 m)
- Time zone: UTC-6 (Central (CST))
  - Summer (DST): UTC-5 (CDT)
- Area code: 254
- GNIS feature ID: 1380724

Vilas is an unincorporated community in Bell County, in the U.S. state of Texas. According to the Handbook of Texas, the community had a population of 15 in 2011. It is located within the Killeen-Temple-Fort Hood metropolitan area.

== History ==
Vilas was first settled in the 1880s. Its population was 15 in 2011.

== Geography ==
Vilas is located on Farm to Market Road 2268, 16 mi (26 km) southeast of Temple in southeastern Bell County.

== Education ==
In 1903, Vilas had a school with one teacher and 49 students and remained in operation in the 1940s. Today, the community is served by the Holland Independent School District.
