= Holland High School (Texas) =

Location
- 100 South Rose Lane; Holland, Bell County, Texas 76534-0217; United States; 30.879929°N 97.409820°W

Information
- School type: Public, high school
- Locale: Rural: Distant
- School district: Holland ISD
- NCES School ID: 482337002373
- Administrator: Shane Downing
- Principal: Robby Edwards
- Teaching staff: 23.93 (on an FTE basis)
- Grades: 9–12
- Enrollment: 187 (2023–2024)
- Student to teacher ratio: 7.81
- Colors: Purple & Gold
- Athletics conference: UIL Class AA
- Mascot: Hornet
- Yearbook: The Hornet
- Website: Holland High School

Holland High School is a public high school located in Holland, Texas, United States and classified as a 2A school by the University Interscholastic League. It is part of the Holland Independent School District located in the southeastern part of Bell County. During 2022–2023, Holland High School had an enrollment of 193 students and a student to teacher ratio of 8.52. The school received an overall rating of "A" from the Texas Education Agency for the 2024–2025 school year.

== Academics ==
- Team Debate Champions (Boys) -
  - 1926(All)

== Athletics ==
The Holland Hornets compete in the following sports -

- Baseball
- Basketball
- Cross Country
- Football
- Golf
- Powerlifting
- Softball
- Track and Field
- Volleyball
