= Salado High School =

Location
- 1880 Williams Road; Salado, Bell County, Texas 76571; United States; 30.966116°N 97.538751°W

Information
- School type: Public, high school
- Locale: Rural: Fringe
- School district: Salado ISD
- Superintendent: Michael Novotny
- NCES School ID: 483858004288
- Principal: Brandon Boyd
- Faculty: 49.89 (on an FTE basis)
- Grades: 9–12
- Enrollment: 725 (2023–2024)
- Student to teacher ratio: 14.53
- Colors: Red & White
- Athletics conference: UIL Class AAAA
- Mascot: Eagles
- Rival: Troy High School and Jarrell High School
- Website: Salado High School website

Salado High School is a public high school located in Salado, Texas and classified as a 4A school by the University Interscholastic League. It is part of the Salado Independent School District located in southern Bell County. During 2022–2023, Salado High School had an enrollment of 716 students and a student to teacher ratio of 14.81. The school received an overall rating of "C" from the Texas Education Agency for the 2024–2025 school year.

== Academics ==
- UIL Academic Meet Champions -
  - 1995(2A), 2000(2A), 2001(2A), 2002(2A), 2003(2A), 2005(2A), 2007(2A), 2013(2A), 2014(2A)

== Athletics ==
The Salado Eagles compete in these sports -

- Baseball
- Basketball
- Cross Country
- Football
- Golf
- Powerlifting
- Soccer
- Softball
- Tennis
- Track and Field
- Volleyball
- Swimming
- Wrestling

=== State Titles ===
- Baseball
  - 2008(2A)
- Boys Golf
  - 1973(B), 1981(1A), 1982(1A), 1983(1A), 1984(1A), 1986(1A), 2008(2A), 2009(2A), 2014 (2A)
- Girls Golf
  - 1982(1A), 2002(2A), 2003(2A), 2006(2A), 2010(2A), 2013(2A)
- Boys Soccer
  - 2025(4A)
- Track - Sprint relay 2010(3A)
- Texas Lone Star Cup
  - 2008(2A), 2013(2A), 2014(2A)

==== State Finalists ====
- Girls Soccer
  - 2026(4A/D1)
- Volleyball
  - 2026(4A/D1)
