= Bland, Texas =

- Ghost town
- Location within Texas Location within the United States
- Coordinates: 31°12′47″N 97°30′52″W
- Country: United States
- State: Texas
- County: Bell
- Elevation: 591 ft (180 m)
- Time zone: UTC-6 (Central (CST))
  - Summer (DST): UTC-5 (CDT)
- Area code: 254
- GNIS feature ID: 1379428

Bland is a ghost town in Bell County, in the U.S. state of Texas. It is located within the Killeen-Temple-Fort Hood metropolitan area.

== History ==
John Atkerson founded the community when he opened a store here in the 1880s. He originally named it Pokerville because of how much he loved playing poker with his customers. A post office was established at Bland in 1894 and was named for local settler D.T. Bland. Its population was 20 in 1896. It grew to 63 in 1925 and returned to 20 in 1949 with only one operating business. It was then submerged into Lake Belton in the mid-1950s.

== Geography ==
Bland was located on Owl Creek and Farm to Market Road 184, 10 mi (16 km) northwest of Belton in northwestern Bell County.

== Education ==
Bland is located within the Belton Independent School District.
