= Zabcikville, Texas =

- Community
- Location within Texas Location within the United States
- Coordinates: 31°02′43″N 97°10′00″W
- Country: United States
- State: Texas
- County: Bell
- Elevation: 489 ft (149 m)

Population (2000)
  - Total: 40
- Time zone: UTC-6 (Central (CST))
  - Summer (DST): UTC-5 (CDT)
- ZIP code: 76501
- Area code: 254
- GNIS feature ID: 1372078

Zabcikville (/ˈzɑːbtʃɪkvɪl/ ZAHB-chik-vil) is an unincorporated community in eastern Bell County, Texas, United States, with a population of approximately 40 according to a 1990 estimate. It is located within the Killeen-Temple-Fort Hood metropolitan area.

== History ==
The town is named for the Zabcik (Žabčík) family, immigrants from Ratiboř in the Zlín Region of Moravia, Czech Republic. When the Zabciks immigrated to Texas in 1855, Ratiboř was part of the Austrian Empire. It was founded by Czechs in the late 19th century and was originally named Marekville after storeowners surnamed Marek and their family. The Zabcik family (one of them named John) married into the Marek family and handed their store over to them. As a result, its name was changed to Zabcikville. It had a population of 60 in 1940 and had three businesses. It went up to 80 residents and gained another business in 1949 but declined throughout the rest of the century. Its population was 38 from 1990 through 2000. The community's local store, with the Zabcikville sign on it, was still in operation at that time. The community's sign stands above a gas station in the community.

Zabcikville is known for Green's Sausage House, which serves as a restaurant and a store for residents and people passing through. It is one of the two remaining buildings in the community and can reach a population of 80 on any given Sunday. Zabcikville is also known for D&M Community Grain L.L.C., which serves as a buyer of commodities for the local farmers.

== Geography ==
Zabcikville is located at the intersection of Texas State Highway 53 and Farm to Market Roads 437 and 2269 on Possum Creek, 13 mi (21 km) east-southeast of Temple in eastern Bell County. It is also located 16 mi (26 km) east of Belton.

== Education ==
Today, Zabcikville is served by the Rogers Independent School District.
