= Armstrong, Texas =

Armstrong, Texas may refer to:

- Armstrong, Bell County, Texas
- Armstrong, Kenedy County, Texas

== See also ==
- Armstrong
