= Belton New Tech High School =

Location
- 320 North Blair Street; Belton, Bell County, Texas 76513; United States; 31.058049°N 97.457713°W

Information
- School type: Public, high school
- Established: August 2011
- School district: Belton ISD
- Superintendent: Malinda Golden
- NCES School ID: 480986014157
- Principal: Neill Plemons
- Faculty: 17.19 (on an FTE basis)
- Grades: 9–12
- Enrollment: 166 (2023–2024)
- Student to teacher ratio: 9.66
- Color
- Team name: Dragons
- Website: Official Website

Belton New Tech High School is a public high school of choice located in Belton, Texas, United States, in the Belton Independent School District. Centered around project-based-learning, the school serves all of BISD, including the city of Belton and Bell County. For the 2024–2025 school year, the school received an overall rating of "A" from the Texas Education Agency.

== Project-based learning ==
Project-based learning is a form of education in which students are expected and encouraged to make projects that connect the curriculum to a real-world, sometimes community-based, application. Belton New Tech utilizes the "Gold Standard PBL model"

== Enrollment Process ==
The school enrolls new freshmen on a first-come first served basis. Prior to 2020, enrollment occurred through the annual Campout Event. Currently, Belton New Tech requires students to complete an application process, including a short personal essay requirement.

== ICE Awards ==
The ICE (Innovation Creativity Excellence) Awards is an annual event that showcases the best projects of the year. Categories include:

- Best Independent Creative Work
- Henry T. Waskow Community Service Award
- Real World Application of Math and Science
- Best Use of Written or Spoken Word
- Best in History, Literature, and World Language
- Best Use of Digital Media in a Project
- Best Use of Innovation in a Project
- Project of the Year

== Stand Alone Campus ==
In 2021, it was announced that Belton New Tech would become a stand-alone campus after partnering with Belton High School for over 10 Years. This decision involved adding new classrooms to the campus and stand-alone electives such as musical theatre, track & field, a law program, a drone program, and more. Belton Independent School District also chose a new mascot; The Dragons. This decision was made after much deliberation by students and staff and was ultimately chosen in honor of the mascot of the former Harris High School, which was Belton's all-Black high school until it was integrated into Belton High School in 1964. The dragon mascot also serves as a nod to the engineering and creativity that Belton New Tech fosters on campus. The colors chosen for the campus were Red and white (Belton High School's colors) as well as purple to reflect BNT@W's status as a Purple Heart school and the commitment each student makes to improve their community. In 2024, Belton New Tech voted to name their dragon mascot Archimedes.
