= Donahoe, Texas =

- Ghost town
- Location within Texas Location within the United States
- Coordinates: 30°48′58″N 97°19′59″W
- Country: United States
- State: Texas
- County: Bell
- Elevation: 538 ft (164 m)
- Time zone: UTC-6 (Central (CST))
  - Summer (DST): UTC-5 (CDT)
- Area code: 254
- GNIS feature ID: 1379673

Donahoe is a ghost town in Bell County, in the U.S. state of Texas. It is located within the Killeen-Temple-Fort Hood metropolitan area.

== Geography ==
Donahoe was located on Donahoe Creek, 16 mi (26 km) southeast of Belton in the southeastern corner of Bell County.

== Education ==
Today, Donahoe is located within the Bartlett Independent School District.
