= Prairie Dell, Texas =

- Unincorporated community
- Location within Texas Location within the United States
- Coordinates: 30°53′03″N 97°34′49″W
- Country: United States
- State: Texas
- County: Bell
- Elevation: 758 ft (231 m)

Population
  - Total: 12
- Time zone: UTC-6 (Central (CST))
  - Summer (DST): UTC-5 (CDT)
- Area code: 254
- GNIS feature ID: 1365725

Prairie Dell is an unincorporated community in Bell County, Texas, United States. According to the Handbook of Texas, the community had an estimated population of 12 in 2000. The community is part of the Killeen-Temple-Fort Hood metropolitan area.

== History ==
A post office was established in Prairie Dell in 1877, before closing the following year and reopening in 1893. The highest population recorded in Prairie Dell was 134 in 1904. The population dropped to 20 in 1964 and 12 in 2000.

== Geography ==
Prairie Dell is located on Interstate 35, 13 mi (21 km) south of Belton in south-central Bell County. It is also located 21 mi (34 km) south of Temple.

== Education ==
In 1903, Prairie Dell had a school with 129 students and two teachers. It had two schools in 1948. Today, the community is served by the Belton Independent School District.

== In popular culture ==
The climax to the movie The Texas Chainsaw Massacre 2 was filmed at the closed Matterhorn amusement park in Prairie Dell.
