= New Colony, Bell County, Texas =

- Unincorporated community
- Location within Texas Location within the United States
- Coordinates: 30°57′44″N 97°09′47″W
- Country: United States
- State: Texas
- County: Bell
- Elevation: 430 ft (130 m)
- Time zone: UTC-6 (Central (CST))
  - Summer (DST): UTC-5 (CDT)
- Area code: 254
- GNIS feature ID: 1380246

New Colony is an unincorporated community in Bell County, in the U.S. state of Texas. According to the Handbook of Texas, only 4 people lived in the community in 2000. It is located within the Killeen-Temple-Fort Hood metropolitan area.

== Geography ==
New Colony is located at the intersection of Farm to Market Road 2184 and New Colony Road along Elm Creek, 15 mi (24 km) southeast of Temple in eastern Bell County.

== Education ==
Today, the community continues to be served by the Rogers ISD.
