= Althea, Texas =

Ghost town in Texas, US

- Ghost town
- Location in Texas
- Coordinates: 30.77320800°N 97.32372300°W
- Country: United States
- State: Texas
- County: Bell

Althea is a ghost town in Bell County, Texas, United States. Situated on Farm to Market Road 487, it was settled in the late 19th century or early 20th century, as a ranch of the Thompson F. Fowler family. A post office operated there from 1900 to 1904. At its peak in 1933, its population was 40. It declined from there, and was abandoned after 1964.
