= Red Ranger (disambiguation) =

Red Ranger is a fictional character in the Power Rangers franchise. It may also refer to:

- Red Ranger, Texas, an unincorporated community.
- The Red Ranger Becomes an Adventurer in Another World

== See also ==
- List of Power Rangers characters
