= Texas State Highway 53 =

State highway in Texas

State Highway 53

Route information
- Maintained by TxDOT
- Length: 26.837 mi (43.190 km)
- Existed: by 1933–present

Major junctions
- West end: SH 36 / Loop 363 in Temple
- I-35 in Temple; SH 320 near Zabcikville
- East end: US 77 near Rosebud

Location
- Country: United States
- State: Texas

Highway system
- Highways in Texas; Interstate; US; State; Former; Toll; Loops; Spurs; FM/RM; Park; Rec
← SH 52	→ US 54

State Highway 53 (SH 53) is a Texas state highway that runs from Temple to Rosebud.

== History ==
Historic SH 53

SH 53 was designated on August 21, 1923, as a route from Dickens to Brownfield, replacing a portion of SH 18. This route was cancelled on March 19, 1930, when SH 24 extended west, replacing the route from Dickens to Lubbock, while the rest of the route was renumbered as part of SH 137.

SH 53 was designated again on March 19, 1930, replacing SH 108A from Lampasas to Temple. On May 20, 1930, the road was corrected to continue east to Rosebud. It was shortened to its current route on September 26, 1939, when the stretch from Lampasas to Temple was transferred to U.S. Route 190 (which this section was cosigned with since 1935). On January 24, 1978, SH 53 was rerouted over part of SH 36 to SH 36.

== Major intersections ==
County	Location	mi	km	Destinations	Notes
Bell	Temple			SH 36 (Airport Road) / Loop 363 (H. K. Dodgen Loop) – Gatesville, Cameron	Interchange
Bell	Temple			I-35 (General Bruce Drive) – Waco, Austin	I-35 exit 301
Bell	Temple			FM 1741 south (31st Street)	
Bell	Temple			Spur 290 (3rd Street)	
Bell	Temple			Loop 363 (H. K. Dodgen Loop)	Interchange
Bell				FM 3117 west	
Bell	Seaton			FM 2086 west	
Bell	Zabcikville			FM 437 south – Rogers	
Bell				FM 485 east – Hearne	
Bell				SH 320 north – Lott	
Falls	Barclay			FM 1772 south	
Falls				FM 1963 south – Burlington	
Falls				US 77 – Waco, Cameron	
1.000 mi = 1.609 km; 1.000 km = 0.621 mi
