= Maxdale, Texas =

- Unincorporated community
- Location within Texas Location within the United States
- Coordinates: 30°59′24″N 97°50′08″W
- Country: United States
- State: Texas
- County: Bell
- Elevation: 745 ft (227 m)
- Time zone: UTC-6 (Central (CST))
  - Summer (DST): UTC-5 (CDT)
- Area code: 254
- GNIS feature ID: 1380156

Maxdale is an unincorporated community in Bell County, in the U.S. state of Texas. According to the Handbook of Texas, only four people lived in the community in 2000. It is located within the Killeen-Temple-Fort Hood metropolitan area.

== Geography ==
Maxdale is located on the Lampasas River, 8 mi (13 km) southwest of Killeen in southwestern Bell County, on Farm to Market Road 2670.

== Education ==
Maxdale had its own school in 1884. Today, the community is served by the Killeen Independent School District.
