= Red Ranger, Texas =

- Unincorporated community
- Location within Texas Location within the United States
- Coordinates: 31°00′24″N 97°10′49″W
- Country: United States
- State: Texas
- County: Bell
- Elevation: 440 ft (130 m)
- Time zone: UTC-6 (Central (CST))
  - Summer (DST): UTC-5 (CDT)
- Area code: 254
- GNIS feature ID: 1380424

Red Ranger is an unincorporated community in Bell County, in the U.S. state of Texas. According to the Handbook of Texas, the community had a population of 12 in 2000. It is located within the Killeen-Temple-Fort Hood metropolitan area.

== History ==
The community was founded by Czech settlers around 1900, including John Simek and Ben Lesikar.

== Geography ==
Red Ranger is located at the intersection of Farm to Market Roads 437 and 940, 11 mi (18 km) southeast of Temple in eastern Bell County.

== Education ==
Red Ranger had its own school in the 1940s. Today, the community is served by the Rogers Independent School District.
