= Morgan's Point Resort, Texas =

- City
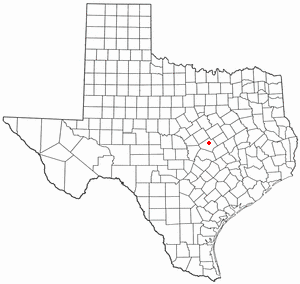
- Location of MorgansPointResort, Texas

- Coordinates: 31°09′05″N 97°27′31″W
- Country: United States
- State: Texas
- County: Bell

Area
  - Total: 2.86 sq mi (7.41 km^{2})
  - Land: 2.85 sq mi (7.38 km^{2})
  - Water: 0.012 sq mi (0.03 km^{2})
- Elevation: 679 ft (207 m)

Population (2020)
  - Total: 4,636
  - Density: 1,644.6/sq mi (634.99/km^{2})
- Time zone: UTC-6 (Central (CST))
  - Summer (DST): UTC-5 (CDT)
- Zip Code: 76513
- FIPS code: 48-49392
- GNIS feature ID: 2411164
- Website: www.mprtx.gov

Morgan's Point Resort is a General Law city in Bell County, Texas, United States. Morgan's Point Resort was incorporated 1970. As of the 2020 census, the population was 4,636. It is part of the Killeen–Temple–Fort Hood Metropolitan Statistical Area.

== Geography ==
Morgan's Point Resort is located north of the center of Bell County on the eastern side of Belton Lake, a reservoir of the Leon River. It is bordered to the south by the city of Temple.

According to the United States Census Bureau, the city has a total area of 2.5 square miles (6.4 km^{2}), all land.

== Demographics ==
Historical population
Census	Pop.	Note	%±
1980	1,082		—
1990	1,766		63.2%
2000	2,989		69.3%
2010	4,170		39.5%
2020	4,636		11.2%
U.S. Decennial Census

As of the 2020 census, Morgan's Point Resort had a population of 4,636, 1,783 households, 1,206 families, and a median age of 42.3 years; 23.0% of residents were under the age of 18 and 18.0% of residents were 65 years of age or older. For every 100 females there were 94.9 males, and for every 100 females age 18 and over there were 92.6 males age 18 and over.

Of those households, 32.9% had children under the age of 18 living in them, 60.9% were married-couple households, 12.7% were households with a male householder and no spouse or partner present, and 21.2% were households with a female householder and no spouse or partner present. About 20.2% of households were made up of individuals and 9.5% had someone living alone who was 65 years of age or older.

There were 1,908 housing units, of which 6.6% were vacant; the homeowner vacancy rate was 1.0% and the rental vacancy rate was 0.9%.

100.0% of residents lived in urban areas, while 0.0% lived in rural areas.

=== Racial and ethnic composition ===
Racial composition as of the 2020 census
Race	Number	Percent
White	3,714	80.1%
Black or African American	90	1.9%
American Indian and Alaska Native	45	1.0%
Asian	34	0.7%
Native Hawaiian and Other Pacific Islander	1	0.0%
Some other race	136	2.9%
Two or more races	616	13.3%
Hispanic or Latino (of any race)	722	15.6%

=== 2000 census ===
As of the census of 2000, the city had 2,989 inhabitants consisting of 1,114 households and 894 families. The population density was 1,169.7 people per square mile (450.8/km^{2}. The city had 1,194 housing units with an average density of 467.3 per square mile (180.4/km^{2}). Racial makeup of the city was 91.03% White, 0.43% African American, 0.43% Native American, 0.60% Asian, 0.17% Pacific Islander, 5.82% from other races, and 1.51% from two or more races. Hispanic or Latino of any race were 9.27% of the population.

Of 1,114 households 40.7% had children under the age of 18 living with them, 65.9% were married couples living together; 10.3% had a female householder with no husband present, and 19.7% were non-families. 16.2% of all households consisted of individuals, 5.6% had someone 65 years or older living alone. Average household size was 2.68, and average family size was 3.00.

Population spread was: 28.6% under the age of 18, 6.2% age 18 to 24, 31.6% age 25 to 44, 24.4% age 45 to 64, and 9.3% age 65 years or older. Median age was 36 years. For every 100 females were 95.4 males. For every 100 females age 18 and over were 94.1 males.

Median income for a household was $51,921, median income for a family was $55,069. Median income for males was $37,095, for females $25,83. Per capita income was $21,522. About 4.3% of families and 6.1% of the population were below the poverty line, including 9.1% of those under age 18 and 3.6% of those age 65 or over.

== Education ==
Morgan's Point Resort is served by the Belton Independent School District.
