= Sparks, Bell County, Texas =

- Unincorporated community
- Location within Texas Location within the United States
- Coordinates: 30°55′43″N 97°21′35″W
- Country: United States
- State: Texas
- County: Bell
- Elevation: 466 ft (142 m)
- Time zone: UTC-6 (Central (CST))
  - Summer (DST): UTC-5 (CDT)
- Area code: 254
- GNIS feature ID: 1368875

Sparks is an unincorporated community in Bell County, in the U.S. state of Texas. According to the Handbook of Texas, the community had a population of 30 in 2000. It is located within the Killeen-Temple-Fort Hood metropolitan area.

== History ==
Established near a railway station in the late nineteenth century, Sparks was likely named after a local family. From 1897 to 1906, it had a post office, and as of 1964 it had a church near the railway station.

Historical population
Year	Pop.	±%
1933	61	—
1964	30	−50.8%
2000	30	+0.0%

== Geography ==
Sparks is located on Farm to Market Road 95 and the Missouri-Kansas-Texas Railroad, 11 mi (18 km) southeast of Belton in southeastern Bell County.

== Education ==
In 1903, Sparks had a school with one teacher and 52 students. Today, the community is served by the Academy Independent School District.
