= Summers Mill, Texas =

- Unincorporated community
- Location within Texas Location within the United States
- Coordinates: 30°58′12″N 97°25′54″W
- Country: United States
- State: Texas
- County: Bell
- Elevation: 466 ft (142 m)
- Time zone: UTC-6 (Central (CST))
  - Summer (DST): UTC-5 (CDT)
- Area code: 254
- GNIS feature ID: 1380571

Summers Mill, also spelled Sommers Mill, is an unincorporated community in Bell County, in the U.S. state of Texas. According to the Handbook of Texas, only six people lived in the community in 2000. It is located within the Killeen-Temple-Fort Hood metropolitan area.

== Geography ==
Summers Mill is located on Salado Creek and Farm to Market Road 1123, 5 mi (8.0 km) southeast of Belton in southeastern Bell County.

== Education ==
In 1903, Summers Mill had a school with 58 students and one teacher and continued to operate in 1948. Today, the community is served by the Belton Independent School District. Schools zoned for the community are Miller Heights Elementary School, Lake Belton Middle School, and Belton High School.
