= Hugh Shelley =

American baseball player (1910–1978)

- Outfielder
- Born: October 26, 1910; Rogers, Texas, U.S.
- Died: June 16, 1978 (aged 67); Beaumont, Texas, U.S.
- Batted: Switch Threw: Right

MLB debut
- June 25, 1935, for the Detroit Tigers

Last MLB appearance
- September 29, 1935, for the Detroit Tigers

MLB statistics
- Batting average: .250
- Home runs: 0
- Runs batted in: 1
- Stats at Baseball Reference

Teams
- Detroit Tigers (1935)

Hubert Leneirre Shelley (October 26, 1910 – June 16, 1978) was an American professional baseball outfielder. He played for 13 seasons from 1932 to 1943 and in 1946. He appeared in seven games in Major League Baseball for the Detroit Tigers during the 1935 season, though he was not on their World Series roster that season.

== Early years ==
Shelley was born in 1910 in Rogers, Texas. His father was a farmer there.

== Professional baseball ==
Shelley began his professional baseball career in 1932, playing for the Decatur Commodores of the Three-I League and the Moline Plowboys of the Mississippi Valley League. He also played for the Shreveport Sports of the Dixie League (1933), and the Beaumont Exporters of the Texas League (1933–1935).

In 1935, he was called up by the Detroit Tigers. He appeared in his first major league game on June 25, 1935. He appeared in a total of seven games for the 1935 Tigers, one of them as the starting center fielder. He had only 10 plate appearances in which he had two singles, two walks, scored a run, and collected an RBI. He appeared in his final major league game on September 29, 1935, finishing with a career batting average of .250 and an on-base percentage of .400. A sports writer in the Detroit Free Press described Shelley in June 1935 as "a slender, gray-eyed lad with wavy brown hair, slightly bowed legs and a calm, pleasant personality."

Shelley continued playing in the minor leagues until 1946, including stints with the Toledo Mud Hens of the American Association (1936), the Fort Worth Cats of the Texas League (1936–1937, 1939, and 1946), the Oklahoma City Indians of the Texas League (1938), the Portland Beavers of the Pacific Coast League (1939), the New Orleans Pelicans of the Southern Association (1939), the Knoxville Smokies of the Southern Association (1939–1941), the Elmira Pioneers of the Eastern League (1942), and the Kansas City Blues of the American Association (1943).

== Later years ==
Shelley died in 1978 at age 67 in Beaumont, Texas.
