= Oenaville, Texas =

- Unincorporated community
- Location within Texas Location within the United States
- Coordinates: 31°07′40″N 97°13′42″W
- Country: United States
- State: Texas
- County: Bell
- Elevation: 568 ft (173 m)
- Time zone: UTC-6 (Central (CST))
  - Summer (DST): UTC-5 (CDT)
- Area code: 254
- GNIS feature ID: 1364346

Oenaville is an unincorporated community in Bell County, in the U.S. state of Texas. According to the Handbook of Texas, the community had a population of 120 in 2000. It is located within the Killeen-Temple-Fort Hood metropolitan area.

== Geography ==
Oenaville is located at the intersection of Farm to Market Roads 438 and 3369, 6 mi (9.7 km) northeast of Temple in northeastern Bell County.

== Education ==
Oenaville had its own school in 1884 and 1949. Today, the community is served by the Troy Independent School District.

== Notable person ==
- Myron L. Williams, dean of Grubbs Vocational College at the University of Texas at Arlington and a native of Oenaville.
