= Seaton, Texas =

- unincorporated community
- Location within Texas Location within the United States
- Coordinates: 31°03′28″N 97°12′58″W
- Country: United States
- State: Texas
- Counties: Bell
- Elevation: 499 ft (152 m)

Population (2000)
  - Total: 60
- Time zone: UTC-6 (Central (CST))
  - Summer (DST): UTC-5 (CDT)
- ZIP code: 76501
- Area code: 254
- GNIS feature ID: 1367911

Seaton is an unincorporated community in Bell County, Texas, United States, with an estimated population of 60 as of 2000. It is located within the Killeen-Temple-Fort Hood metropolitan area.

== History ==
The community was first recognized when Czech families settled in the area in 1881. It had a store and a saloon when the town applied for a post office in 1891. It was given the name Seaton, which accordingly was not named after any settlers. Seventeen people were living in Seaton in 1896 and the community had a cotton gin as well. A Czech Brethren church was established in 1906. The post office closed in 1907. The population reached 55 circa 1933, with three businesses and peaked at 80 right before 1950 with a church, five businesses, and a community park. All businesses closed by the 1960s. The population declined to 60 in 2000.

== Geography ==
Seaton is located at the intersection of Farm-to-Market roads 53 and 2086, 8 mi (13 km) east of Temple in eastern Bell County.

== Education ==
In 1903, Seaton had a school with 55 students and one teacher. Today, the community is served by the Rogers Independent School District.
