= Airville, Texas =

- Unincorporated community
- Location within Texas Location within the United States
- Coordinates: 31°04′38″N 97°09′49″W
- Country: United States
- State: Texas
- County: Bell
- Elevation: 538 ft (164 m)
- Time zone: UTC-6 (Central (CST))
  - Summer (DST): UTC-5 (CDT)
- Area code: 254
- GNIS feature ID: 1379327

Airville is an unincorporated community in Bell County, in the U.S. state of Texas. According to the Handbook of Texas, the community had a population of 10 in 2000. It is located within the Killeen-Temple-Fort Hood metropolitan area.

== History ==
Airville had three businesses in 1931 with only one business and several scattered houses in 1944. Ten people lived in those scattered homes from 1964 through 2000.

== Geography ==
Airville is located at the intersection of Farm to Market Roads 437 and 2904, 11 mi (18 km) east of Temple in northeastern Bell County.

== Education ==
Airville had its own school in 1944. Today, the community is served by the Rosebud-Lott Independent School District.
