= White Hall, Texas =

- Unincorporated community
- Location within Texas Location within the United States
- Coordinates: 31°13′10″N 97°25′47″W
- Country: United States
- State: Texas
- County: Bell
- Elevation: 705 ft (215 m)
- Time zone: UTC-6 (Central (CST))
  - Summer (DST): UTC-5 (CDT)
- Area code: 254
- GNIS feature ID: 1371372

White Hall is an unincorporated community in Bell County, in the U.S. state of Texas. According to the Handbook of Texas, the community had a population of 45 in 2000. It is located within the Killeen-Temple-Fort Hood metropolitan area.

== History ==
The area in what is now known as White Hall today was established prior to the community's 1856 construction of a Masonic Lodge. Members of the community were primarily Anglo and German American farmers.

Historical population
Year	Pop.	±%
1933	25	—
1964	45	+80.0%
2000	45	+0.0%

== Geography ==
White Hall is located on Farm to Market Road 2409, 9 mi (14 km) northwest of Temple in northwestern Bell County.

== Education ==
In 1903, White Hall had a school with 23 students enrolled. It is served by the Moody Independent School District.
