= Ding Dong, Texas =

- Unincorporated community
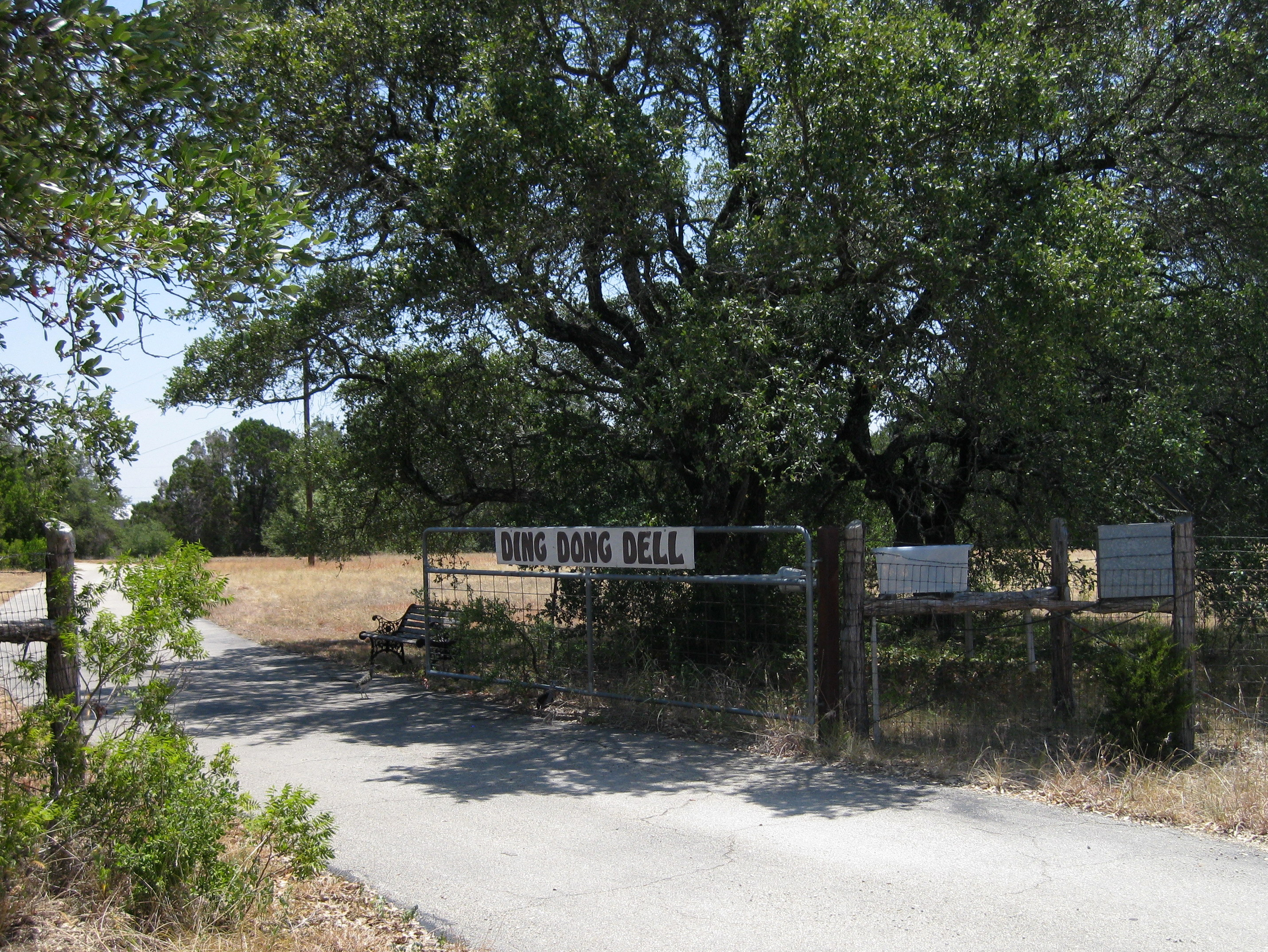
- Entrance to Ding Dong Dell in the community of Ding Dong

- Location within Texas Location within the United States
- Coordinates: 30°58′55″N 97°46′16″W
- Country: United States
- State: Texas
- County: Bell
- Founded: 1930s
- Elevation: 833 ft (254 m)
- Time zone: UTC-6 (CST)
  - Summer (DST): UTC-5 (CDT)
- Postal code: 76542
- GNIS feature ID: 2034698

Ding Dong is an unincorporated community in Central Texas, United States. According to the Handbook of Texas, it had a population of 22 in 2000. It is located within the Killeen–Temple metropolitan area.

== History ==
In the early 1930s, a man named Zulis Bell and his first cousin Isaac Bertram "Bert" Bell operated a country store along the Lampasas River in central Texas in an area that was known as McBryde Crossing. They hired the artist C.C. Hoover to make a sign for it. The finished sign had two bells on it with the name Zulis in one and Bert in the other. The bells were reported to have been requested by Dallas newspaper columnist Frank X. Tolbert. The bells, weighing 200 lbs., were brought to the community via the Atchison, Topeka and Santa Fe Railway in 1962, and were given to the "mayor" of the community, Charlie Hold, by two of the railroad's vice presidents. Hold took over the Bells' store in 1950. In addition to the bells, Hoover lettered the words, Ding Dong. As the community grew around the country store, it took on the name 'Ding Dong'.

It is said that the community first came to the country's attention from Ripley's Believe It or Not! when travel writer Bill Bryson mentioned it in his book Made in America and Gary Gladstone mentioned it in Passing Gas: And Other Towns Along The American Highway with a photograph of carpet salesman and fire chief Harold Rowe posing in front of his fire truck. This community has frequently been noted on lists of unusual place names.

The Killeen Lions Club International tried to secure Ding Dong as the site of the district convention in 1964.

The community had a church and several scattered homes in 1979 and 22 residents from 1990 through 2000.

== Geography ==
Ding Dong is situated on Texas State Highway 195 along the Lampasas River, 8 mi (13 km) south of Killeen in southwestern Bell County. It is also located 20 mi (32 km) west of Salado via Farm to Market Road 2484, as well as 58 mi (93 km) north of Austin, the state capital.

== Education ==
Ding Dong is served by the Killeen Independent School District.

== Notable person ==
- Sons of the Pioneers fiddler Hugh Farr was born in Ding Dong.
