= Pendleton, Texas =

Unincorporated community in Texas, US

Coordinates: 31°11′43″N 97°20′12″W

Pendleton is an unincorporated community and census-designated place in Bell County, Texas, United States. As of the 2020 census, Pendleton had a population of 845. Pendleton has a post office with the ZIP code 76564. The community was the birthplace of blues musician Blind Willie Johnson and Green Bay Packers safety Bobby Dillon.

Pendleton is part of the Killeen–Temple–Fort Hood Killeen-Temple-Fort Hood metropolitan area.

== Demographics ==
Historical population
| Census | Pop. | Note | %± |
|---|---|---|---|
| 2020 | 845 | | — |
U.S. Decennial Census; 1850–1900 1910; 1920 1930 1940; 1950 1960 1970; 1980 1990 2000; 2010 2020

Pendleton first appeared as a census designated place in the 2020 U.S. census.

=== 2020 Census ===
Pendleton CDP, Texas – Racial and ethnic composition Note: the US Census treats Hispanic/Latino as an ethnic category. This table excludes Latinos from the racial categories and assigns them to a separate category. Hispanics/Latinos may be of any race.
| Race / Ethnicity (NH = Non-Hispanic) | Pop 2020 | % 2020 |
|---|---|---|
| White alone (NH) | 624 | 73.85% |
| Black or African American alone (NH) | 10 | 1.18% |
| Native American or Alaska Native alone (NH) | 6 | 0.71% |
| Asian alone (NH) | 1 | 0.12% |
| Pacific Islander alone (NH) | 0 | 0.00% |
| Other race alone (NH) | 5 | 0.59% |
| Mixed race or Multiracial (NH) | 36 | 4.26% |
| Hispanic or Latino (any race) | 163 | 19.29% |
| Total | 845 | 100.00% |
