= Florence Independent School District =

School district in Texas

Address
- 306 College Avenue Florence, Texas, 76527; United States

District information
- Type: Public
- Grades: PreK–12
- NCES District ID: 4819320

Students and staff
- Students: 1,075 (2020–2021)
- Teachers: 84.9 (on an FTE basis)
- Staff: 93.72 (on an FTE basis)
- Student–teacher ratio: 12.66:1

Other information
- Website: florenceisd.net

Florence Independent School District is a public school district based in Florence, Texas, United States. Located in Williamson County, a small portion of the district extends into Bell County.

In 2009, the school district was rated "recognized" by the Texas Education Agency.

== Schools ==
- Florence High (grades 9-12)
  - FHS operates one of the very few school-run meat markets in the country, and the only one in Texas, operated by a Class AAA school.
- Florence Middle (grades 6-8)
- Florence Elementary (prekindergarten-grade 5)
