= Pidcoke, Texas =

- Unincorporated community
- Location within Texas Location within the United States
- Coordinates: 31°16′45″N 97°53′18″W
- Country: United States
- State: Texas
- County: Coryell
- Elevation: 810 ft (250 m)
- Time zone: UTC-6 (Central (CST))
  - Summer (DST): UTC-5 (CDT)
- Area code: 254
- GNIS feature ID: 1365170

Pidcoke is an unincorporated community in Coryell County, in the U.S. state of Texas. According to the Handbook of Texas, the community had a population of 30 in 2000. It is located within the Killeen-Temple-Fort Hood metropolitan area.

== History ==
Pidcoke was founded by a group of colonists, which they named after English settler Rev. Richard Burton Pidcocke

On April 19, 1996, an F0 tornado struck Pidcoke, destroying several barns.

== Geography ==
Pidcoke is located on U.S. Highway 84 West and Farm to Market Road 116, 15 mi (24 km) southwest of Gatesville, 51 mi (82 km) southwest of Waco, 45 mi (72 km) northwest of Temple, 26 mi (42 km) northeast of Lampasas, and south of Cowhouse Creek in southwestern Coryell County.

=== Climate ===
The climate in this area is characterized by hot, humid summers and generally mild to cool winters. According to the Köppen Climate Classification system, Pidcoke has a humid subtropical climate.

== Education ==
In 1884 the town had one school Today, the community is served by the Gatesville Independent School District.

== See also ==
- U.S. Route 190
- U.S. Route 183 in Texas
