= Aireville Park =

Park in Skipton, North Yorkshire, England

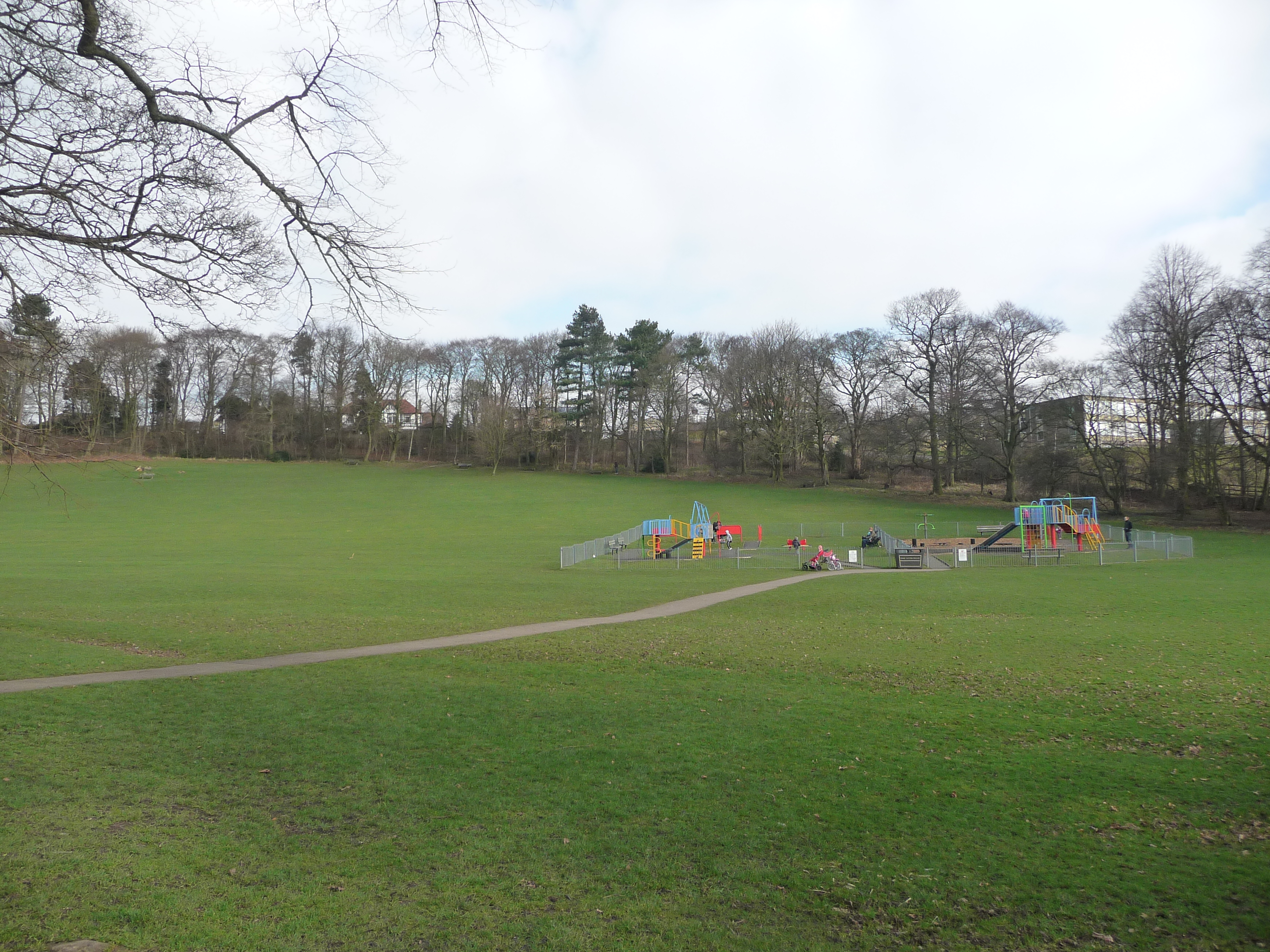
- Playground in Aireville Park
- Interactive map of Aireville Park
- Type: Park
- Location: Skipton, North Yorkshire, England
- Coordinates: 53°57′43″N 2°01′46″W
- Operator: North Yorkshire Council
- Open: All year

Aireville Park is a park in Skipton, North Yorkshire, England.

== History ==
Aireville Park was created in the 1830s by Henry Allcock as part of the Aireville Estate. Thereafter the Dewhurst family who were Skipton textile mill owners purchased the estate including Aireville Hall. In 1945 the estate came into the hands of Skipton Urban Council for £15,000.

=== Landmarks ===
Aireville Hall the original manor house for the estate became part of a school now named The Skipton Academy and is a Grade II listed building. Aireville Lodge located in the park is also Grade II listed.

== Facilities ==
Craven leisure centre is at the park and has a range of indoor activities such as swimming pools, a gym and a cafe. There is a pitch and foot course, skate park, cycle track, zip wire and children's play area. Skipton Parkrun takes place in the park every Saturday morning. The woodland behind the leisure centre is home to Raven Tree Top Adventure a high ropes course designed for adults and teenagers.
