= Holland, Texas =

- City
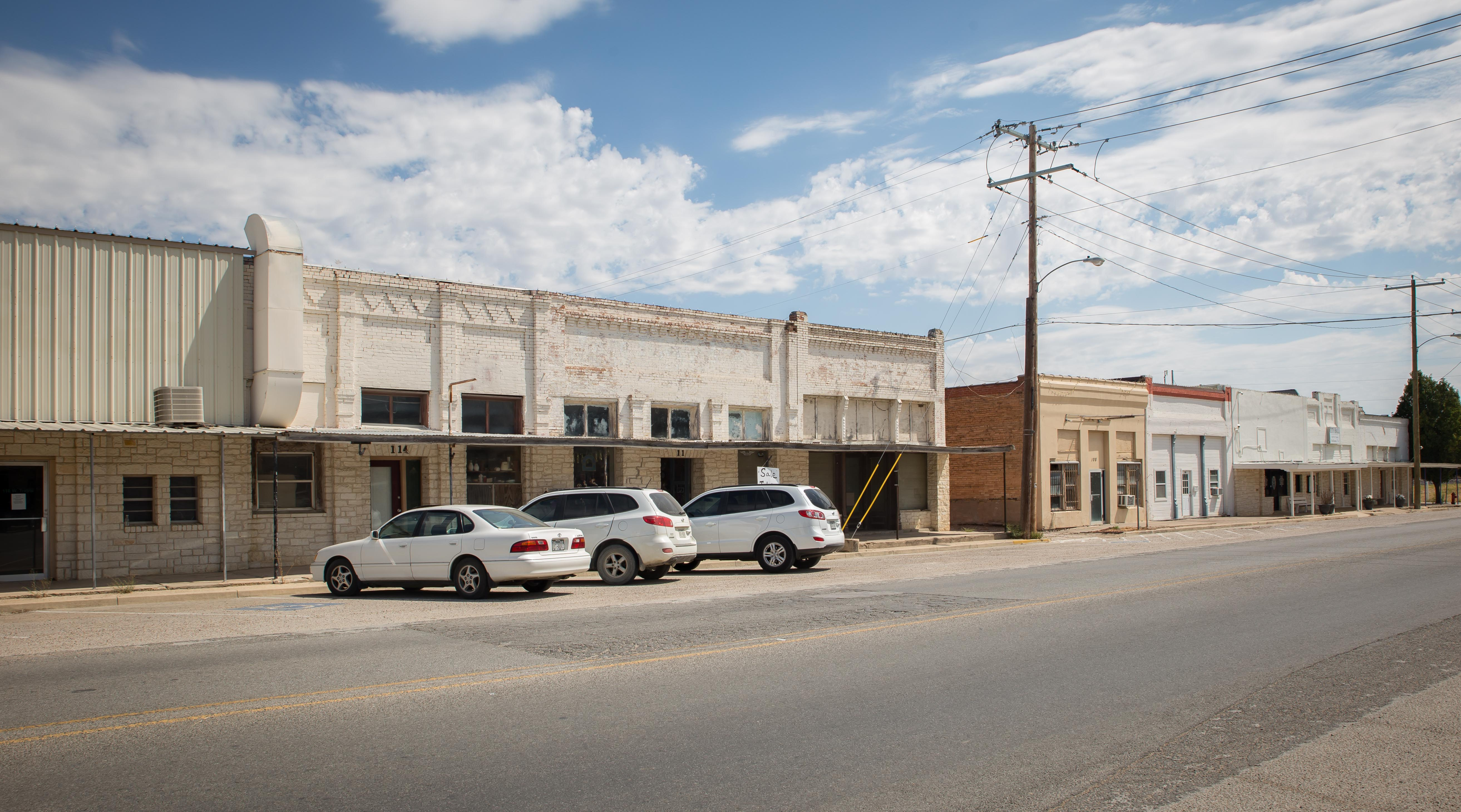
- Old buildings in Holland
- Nickname: "The Friendly Community"
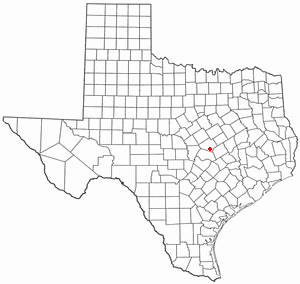
- Location of Holland, Texas

- Coordinates: 30°52′51″N 97°24′16″W
- Country: United States
- State: Texas
- County: Bell
- Settled: 1860 as Mountain Home
- Incorporated: 1891

Government
  - Mayor: Clif Carroll

Area
  - Total: 1.66 sq mi (4.31 km^{2})
  - Land: 1.64 sq mi (4.26 km^{2})
  - Water: 0.019 sq mi (0.05 km^{2})
- Elevation: 538 ft (164 m)

Population (2020)
  - Total: 1,075
  - Density: 712.1/sq mi (274.93/km^{2})
- Time zone: UTC-6 (Central (CST))
  - Summer (DST): UTC-5 (CDT)
- ZIP code: 76534
- Area code: 254
- FIPS code: 48-34508
- GNIS feature ID: 2412762
- Website: City website

Holland is a city in Bell County, Texas, United States. The population was 1,075 at the 2020 census. The center of population of Texas is located in Holland. It is part of the Killeen–Temple–Fort Hood metropolitan statistical area.

== History ==
Holland's history reaches back to a time before the Civil War, when a community known as Mountain Home began to grow up near Gotcher's Mountain, a hill south of town. A post office was established on August 22, 1870, under the name Mountain Home, with James Shaw as postmaster. On November 6, 1871, the Mountain Home post office was officially closed.

In 1881, an extension of the Missouri–Kansas–Texas Railroad was laid out from Denison to Taylor, and the tracks were constructed through Bell County in 1881 and 1882, from north to south, passing through the Holland community. This brought about the town of Holland as it is known today.

James Reuben Holland arrived in Belton, Texas, on October 26, 1874, with a wagon and horses, his wife and four children, and six dollars cash. A. Moss made an application for the Mountain Home community to have a new post office again, but by that time, the name "Mountain Home" had already been claimed by another community. Without Holland's knowledge, Moss submitted the name "Holland". The Holland post office was officially approved April 10, 1879, with the appointment of Alfred Evans as postmaster. In 1877, Holland bought 105 acres (42 ha) of land along Darr's Creek for $5.00 an acre. The following year, Holland bought an additional 145 acres (59 ha) and built a steam-powered cotton gin.

== Geography ==
Holland is located in southeastern Bell County. Texas State Highway 95 passes through the town, leading north 17 miles (27 km) to Temple and south 22 miles (35 km) to Taylor.

According to the United States Census Bureau, the town has a total area of 1.8 square miles (4.6 km^{2}), of which 0.019 square miles (0.05 km^{2}), or 1.12%, is covered by water.

== Demographics ==
Historical population
Census	Pop.	Note	%±
1890	368		—
1900	678		84.2%
1910	778		14.7%
1920	690		−11.3%
1930	788		14.2%
1940	741		−6.0%
1950	674		−9.0%
1960	653		−3.1%
1970	723		10.7%
1980	863		19.4%
1990	1,118		29.5%
2000	1,102		−1.4%
2010	1,121		1.7%
2020	1,075		−4.1%
U.S. Decennial Census

Holland racial composition as of 2020 (NH = Non-Hispanic) (Note: Note: the US Census treats Hispanic/Latino as an ethnic category. This table excludes Latinos from the racial categories and assigns them to a separate category. Hispanics/Latinos can be of any race.)
Race	Number	Percentage
White (NH)	688	64.0%
Black or African American (NH)	54	5.02%
Native American or Alaska Native (NH)	1	0.09%
Asian (NH)	3	0.28%
Pacific Islander (NH)	1	0.09%
Some Other Race (NH)	6	0.56%
Mixed/Multi-Racial (NH)	48	4.47%
Hispanic or Latino	274	25.49%
Total	1,075	

As of the 2020 United States census, there were 1,075 people, 487 households, and 373 families residing in the town.

As of the census of 2000, 1,102 people, 388 households, and 287 families resided in the town. The population density was 625.0 inhabitants per square mile (241.3/km^{2}). Thewere 432 housing units averaged 245.0/sq mi (94.8/km^{2}). The racial makeup of the town was 85.57% White, 5.35% African American, 0.09% Native American, 0.54% Asian, 0.82% Pacific Islander, 4.81% from other races, and 2.81% from two or more races. Hispanics or Latinos of any race were 20.24% of the population.

Of the 388 households, 43.0% had children under the age of 18 living with them, 53.1% were married couples living together, 15.2% had a female householder with no husband present, and 26.0% were not families. About 23.7% of all households were made up of individuals, and 12.1% had someone living alone who was 65 years of age or older. The average household size was 2.84 and the average family size was 3.38.

In the town, the population was distributed as 35.6% under the age of 18, 7.9% from 18 to 24, 27.8% from 25 to 44, 19.3% from 45 to 64, and 9.4% who were 65 years of age or older. The median age was 29 years. For every 100 females, there were 91.3 males. For every 100 females age 18 and over, there were 85.9 males.

The median income for a household in the town was $26,500, and for a family was $31,250. Males had a median income of $25,114 versus $19,167 for females. The per capita income for the town was $11,360. About 24.2% of families and 30.1% of the population were below the poverty line, including 41.2% of those under age 18 and 29.6% of those age 65 or over.

== Education ==
Holland is served by the Holland Independent School District.

== Festivities ==
Holland is home to the Corn Festival. The "Corn Fest", as the locals call it, is held every third Saturday in June. It traditionally includes a parade on Saturday, carnival from that Wednesday until Saturday, and live music and street dances on Friday and Saturday nights.
