= Ratiboř (Vsetín District) =

- Municipality
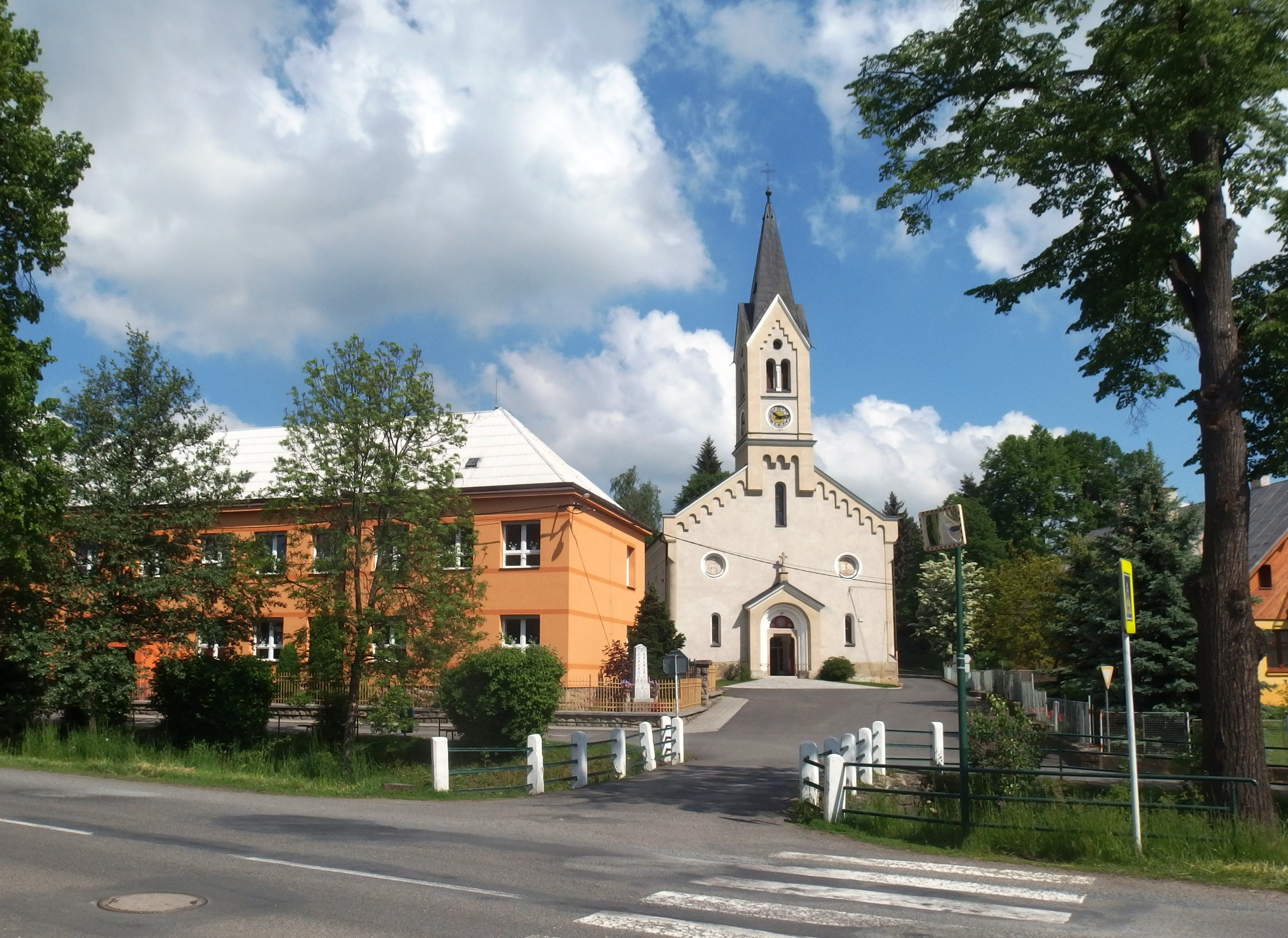
- Primary school and Protestant church

- Flag Coat of arms

- Location in the Czech Republic
- Coordinates: 49°22′4″N 17°54′54″E
- Country: Czech Republic
- Region: Zlín
- District: Vsetín
- First mentioned: 1306

Area
  - Total: 18.75 km^{2} (7.24 sq mi)
- Elevation: 343 m (1,125 ft)

Population (2026-01-01)
  - Total: 1,830
  - Density: 97.6/km^{2} (253/sq mi)
- Time zone: UTC+1 (CET)
  - Summer (DST): UTC+2 (CEST)
- Postal code: 756 21
- Website: www.ratibor.cz

Ratiboř is a municipality and village in Vsetín District in the Zlín Region of the Czech Republic. It has about 1,800 inhabitants.

Ratiboř lies approximately 7 kilometres (4 mi) north-west of Vsetín, 23 km (14 mi) north-east of Zlín, and 265 km (165 mi) east of Prague.

== Demographics ==
Historical population
| Year | Pop. | ±% |
|---|---|---|
| 1869 | 1,116 | — |
| 1880 | 1,291 | +15.7% |
| 1890 | 1,415 | +9.6% |
| 1900 | 1,469 | +3.8% |
| 1910 | 1,528 | +4.0% |
| 1921 | 1,372 | −10.2% |
| 1930 | 1,468 | +7.0% |
| 1950 | 1,172 | −20.2% |
| 1961 | 1,621 | +38.3% |
| 1970 | 1,605 | −1.0% |
| 1980 | 1,622 | +1.1% |
| 1991 | 1,732 | +6.8% |
| 2001 | 1,756 | +1.4% |
| 2011 | 1,730 | −1.5% |
| 2021 | 1,774 | +2.5% |
Source: Censuses
