= Holland Independent School District =

School district in Texas

Holland Independent School District is a public school district based in Holland, Texas (USA). Located in Bell County, a small portion of the district extends into Milam County.

In 2009, the school district was rated "recognized" by the Texas Education Agency.

== Schools ==
- Holland High School (Grades 9–12)
- Bowman Middle School (Grades 6–8)
- Holland Elementary School (Grades PK-5)
