= Salado Independent School District =

School district in Texas

Salado Independent School District is a public school district based in Salado, Texas, United States. It is located in Bell County midway between Austin and Waco on Interstate 35.

In 2012, the school district was rated five stars on the Financial Allocation Study for Texas (FAST) ratings based on students' reading and mathematics achievement and district spending.

== Schools ==
- Salado High School (Grades 9–12)
- Salado Middle School (Grades 6–8)
- Salado Creek Elementary School (Grades PK-5)
- Thomas Arnold Elementary (Grades PK-5)

== Administration ==
- Superintendent: Dr. Michael Novotny

== Academia ==
The Salado High School Academic UIL Team has won eight state championships, including the most recent state championship in 2013. The One Act Play won championships in 2010 and 2012. Salado High School won the Texas Lone Star Cup in 2008 and 2013. SISD provides over 25 career and technology courses, including horticulture, fish hatcheries, forestry, biotechnology, agriculture sciences, home economics, web mastering, and computer animation graphics.

== Taxes ==
The tax rate for Salado ISD is currently $1.30 per $100 evaluation of property with $1.04 going to Maintenance and Operations and $.26 going to debt service.
