= Rogers, Texas =

- Town
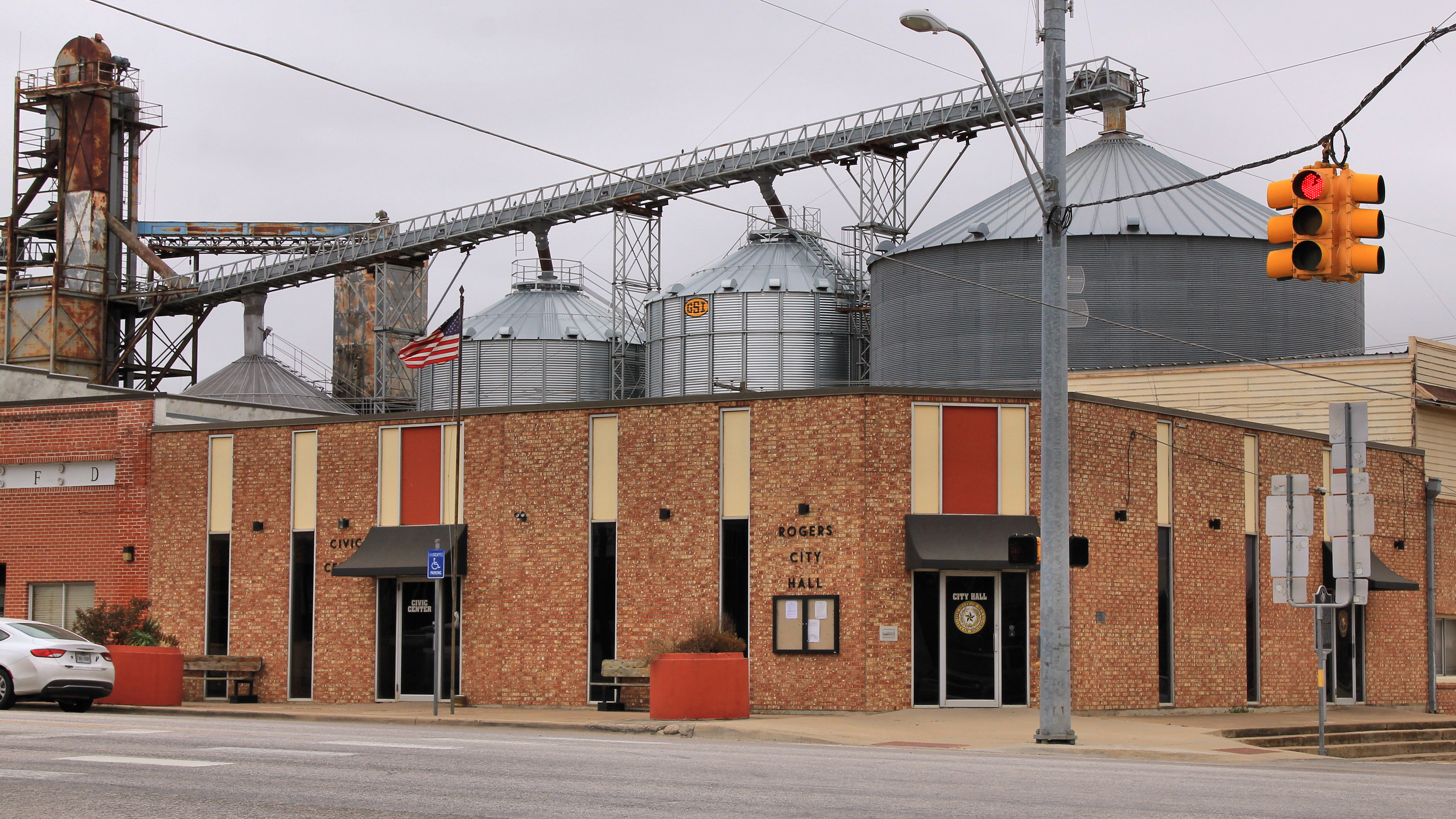
- Rogers City Hall

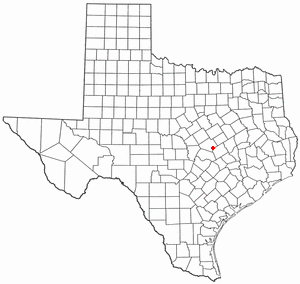
- Location of Rogers, Texas

- Coordinates: 30°55′48″N 97°13′44″W
- Country: United States
- State: Texas
- County: Bell

Area
  - Total: 1.06 sq mi (2.75 km^{2})
  - Land: 1.03 sq mi (2.67 km^{2})
  - Water: 0.031 sq mi (0.08 km^{2})
- Elevation: 535 ft (163 m)

Population (2020)
  - Total: 1,113
  - Density: 1,213.6/sq mi (468.58/km^{2})
- Time zone: UTC-6 (Central (CST))
  - Summer (DST): UTC-5 (CDT)
- ZIP code: 76569
- Area code: 254
- FIPS code: 48-62924
- GNIS feature ID: 2412570
- Website: www.cityofrogerstx.gov/index.php

Rogers is a town in Bell County, Texas, United States. The population was 1,113 at the 2020 census. It is part of the Killeen-Temple-Fort Hood metropolitan area.

== Geography ==
Rogers is located in southeastern Bell County. U.S. Route 190 passes through the town, leading northwest 14 miles (23 km) to Temple and southeast 17 miles (27 km) to Cameron.

According to the United States Census Bureau, the town has a total area of 1.0 square mile (2.7 km^{2}), of which 0.031 square miles (0.08 km^{2}), or 3.16%, is covered by water.

== Demographics ==
Historical population
Census	Pop.	Note	%±
1900	664		—
1910	1,275		92.0%
1920	1,256		−1.5%
1930	1,032		−17.8%
1940	911		−11.7%
1950	948		4.1%
1960	936		−1.3%
1970	1,030		10.0%
1980	1,242		20.6%
1990	1,131		−8.9%
2000	1,117		−1.2%
2010	1,218		9.0%
2020	1,113		−8.6%
U.S. Decennial Census

Rogers racial composition as of 2020 (NH = Non-Hispanic) (Note: Note: the US Census treats Hispanic/Latino as an ethnic category. This table excludes Latinos from the racial categories and assigns them to a separate category. Hispanics/Latinos can be of any race.)
Race	Number	Percentage
White (NH)	529	47.53%
Black or African American (NH)	35	3.14%
Asian (NH)	5	0.45%
Some Other Race (NH)	6	0.54%
Mixed/Multi-Racial (NH)	51	4.58%
Hispanic or Latino	487	43.76%
Total	1,113	

As of the 2020 United States census, there were 1,113 people, 414 households, and 329 families residing in the town.

As of the census of 2000, 1,117 people, 413 households, and 296 families resided in the town. The population density was 1,477.9 inhabitants per square mile (570.6/km^{2}). The 468 housing units averaged 619.2/sq mi (237.8/km^{2}). The racial makeup of the town was 75.38% White, 4.30% African American, 0.45% Native American, 0.09% Asian, 17.37% from other races, and 2.42% from two or more races. Hispanics or Latinos of any race were 27.84% of the population.

Of the 413 households, 40.2% had children under the age of 18 living with them, 51.1% were married couples living together, 13.8% had a female householder with no husband present, and 28.3% were not families. About 26.9% of all households were made up of individuals, and 13.8% had someone living alone who was 65 years of age or older. The average household size was 2.70 and the average family size was 3.30.

In the town, the population was distributed as 32.1% under the age of 18, 8.2% from 18 to 24, 27.8% from 25 to 44, 20.3% from 45 to 64, and 11.5% who were 65 years of age or older. The median age was 32 years. For every 100 females, there were 89.6 males. For every 100 females age 18 and over, there were 86.2 males.

The median income for a household in the town was $26,136, and for a family was $38,274. Males had a median income of $30,179 versus $20,385 for females. The per capita income for the town was $13,893. About 13.3% of families and 17.9% of the population were below the poverty line, including 27.0% of those under age 18 and 25.3% of those age 65 or over.

== Education ==
The Town of Rogers is served by the Rogers Independent School District.

== Notable people ==
- Ki Aldrich, (1916-1983) football player
- Alvin Ailey, (1931–1989) dancer and activist who founded the Alvin Ailey American Dance Theater
- Taylor Jungmann, (b 1989) is a former professional baseball player, he played mostly for Milwaukee Brewers.
- William D. McElroy, (1917–1999) biochemist and academic administrator, born in Rogers.
- Hugh Shelley, (1910–1978) played professional baseball for the Detroit Tigers.
- Joe Tex, (1935–1982), was an American singer and musician
