= Bell County, Texas =

County in Texas, United States

- County
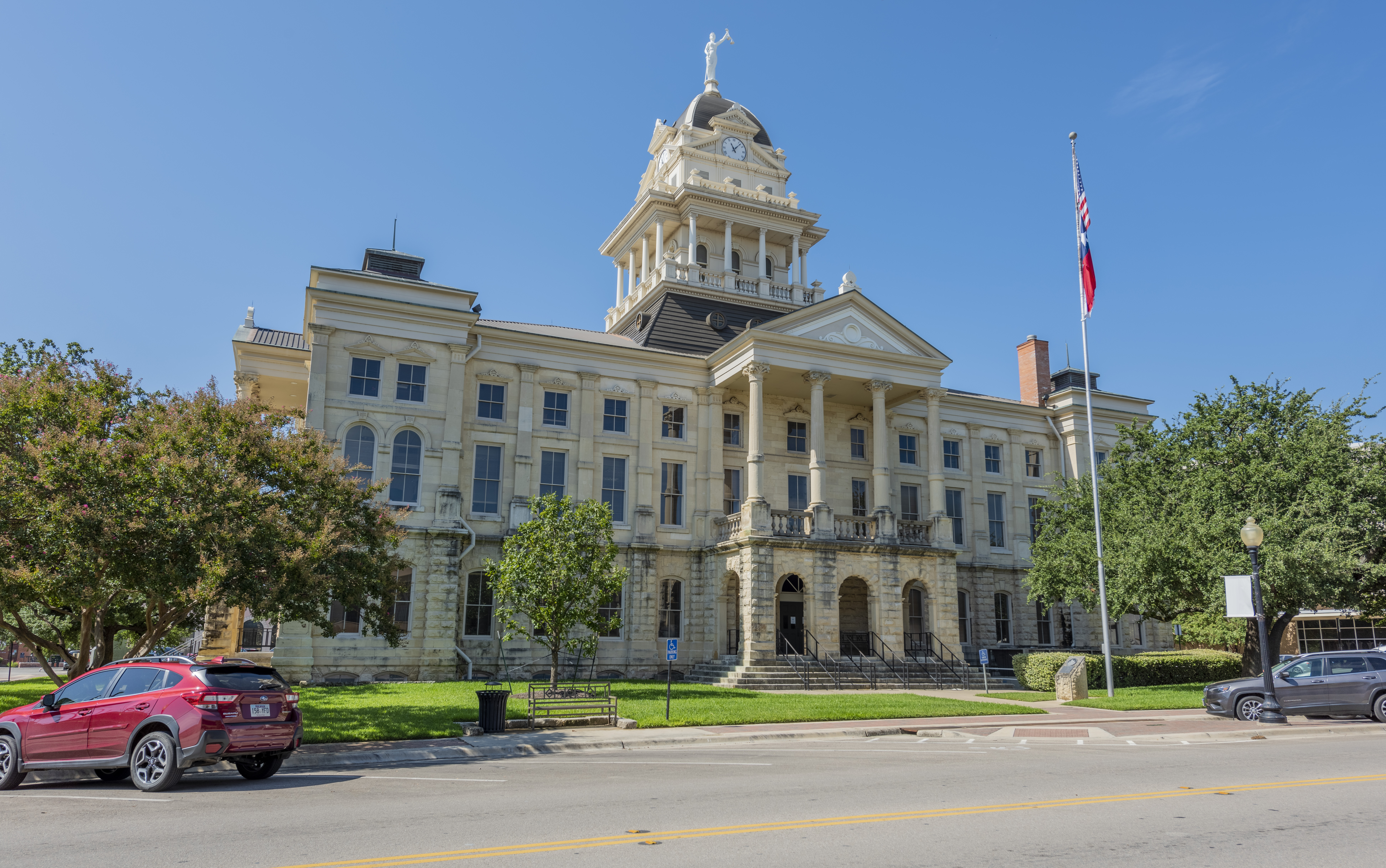
- The Bell County Courthouse in Belton

- Location within the U.S. state of Texas
- Coordinates: 31°02′N 97°29′W
- Country: United States
- State: Texas
- Founded: 1850
- Named for: Peter Hansborough Bell
- Seat: Belton
- Largest city: Killeen

Area
  - Total: 1,088 sq mi (2,820 km^{2})
  - Land: 1,051 sq mi (2,720 km^{2})
  - Water: 37 sq mi (96 km^{2}) 3.4%

Population (2020)
  - Total: 370,647
  - Estimate (2025): 402,248 ▲
  - Density: 352.7/sq mi (136.2/km^{2})
- Time zone: UTC−6 (Central)
  - Summer (DST): UTC−5 (CDT)
- Congressional districts: 11th, 31st
- Website: www.bellcountytx.com

Bell County is a county in the U.S. state of Texas. It is in Central Texas and its county seat is Belton. As of the 2020 census, its population was 370,647. Bell County is part of the Killeen–Temple, Texas, Metropolitan Statistical Area. The county was founded in 1850 and is named for Peter Hansborough Bell, the third governor of Texas. In 2010, the center of population of Texas was located in Bell County, near the town of Holland.

== History ==
In 1834–1835, Little River became part of Robertson's Colony, made up of settlers from Nashville, Tennessee, led by Sterling C. Robertson; they were the families of Captain Goldsby Childers, Robert Davison, John Fulcher, Moses Griffin, John Needham, Michael Reed and his son William Whitaker Reed, William Taylor, and Judge Orville T. Tyler. This area became known as the Tennessee Valley. Soon after (1836) the settlements were deserted during the Runaway Scrape, reoccupied, deserted again after the Elmwood Creek Blood Scrape, and reoccupied. Texas Ranger George Erath established a fort on Little River.

During 1843–44, settlers began returning. The next year, the Republic of Texas founded Baylor Female College (since developed as University of Mary Hardin–Baylor).

In 1850, Bell County was organized and named for Texas Governor Peter Hansborough Bell. The population then was 600 whites and 60 black slaves. Belton was designated as the county seat in 1851.

The last serious Indian raid in the area occurred in 1859. Bell County assumed its present boundaries with the 1860 resurvey of the line between Bell and Milam Counties.

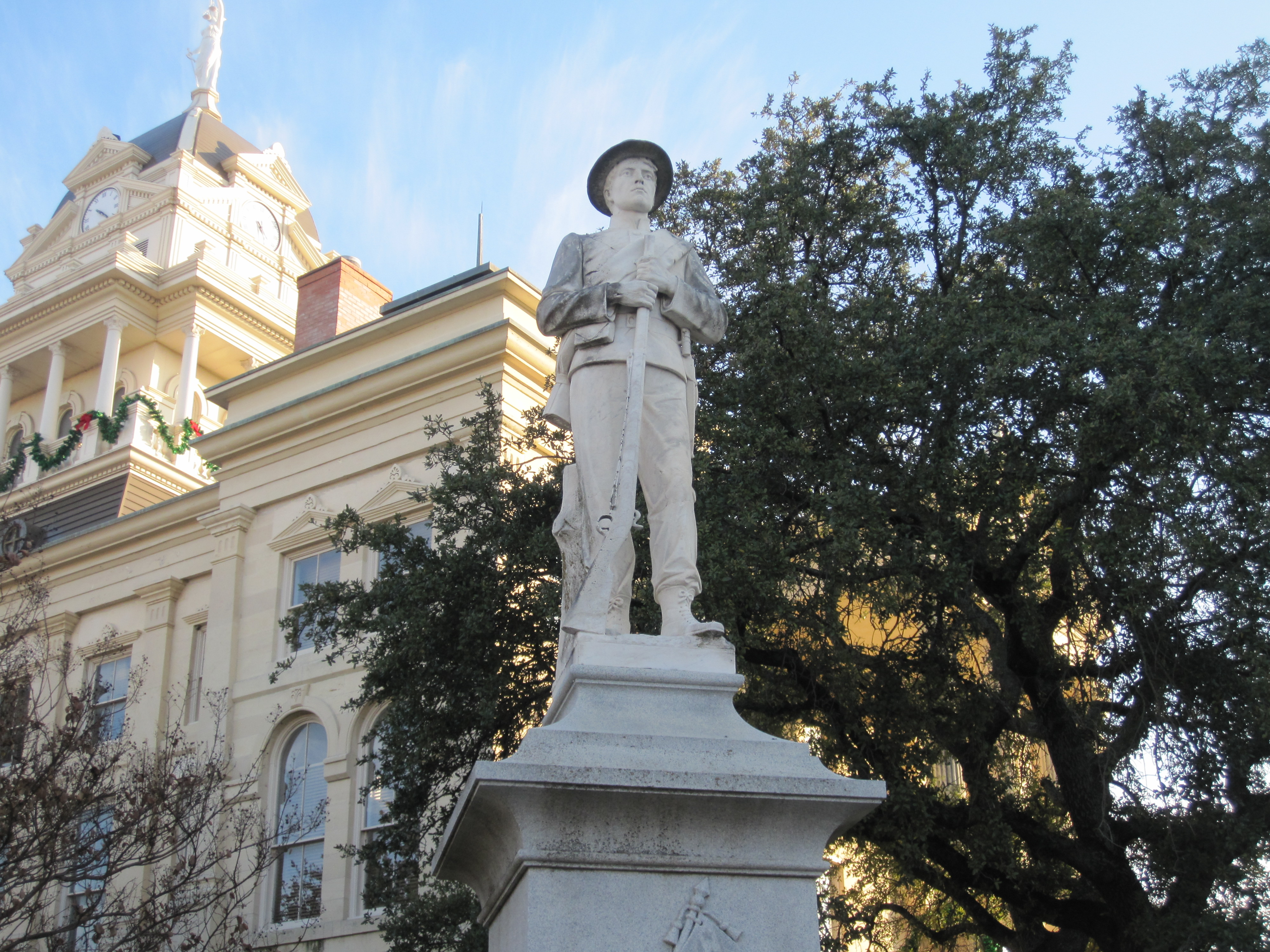
Confederate statue at Bell County Courthouse

In 1861, the county voted for secession from the Union. Residents were divided, as many yeomen farmers did not support the war. From 1862 to 1865, Union sympathizers and Confederate deserters holed up in "Camp Safety". Following the war, new social movements developed. In 1867, the Belton Women's Commonwealth, the first women's movement in Central Texas, was formed by Martha McWhirter. The group provided shelter to women in abusive relationships.

During the early years of the Reconstruction era (1865–1877), so much violence occurred in the county that the government stationed federal troops in Belton. Some racist whites attacked blacks and their white supporters. Corruption, lawlessness, and racial divides were severe. As in many areas, a local version of white paramilitary insurgents developed who were similar to the Ku Klux Klan; they worked to suppress black and Republican voting.

The coming of railroads in the late 19th century stimulated growth across the state. In 1881, the Gulf, Colorado and Santa Fe Railway, the first railroad to be built in Bell County, established Temple as its headquarters. Reflecting growth in the county, in 1884, the Bell County Courthouse was built. It is still used. The ambitious Renaissance Revival design was by architect Jasper N. Preston and Sons. As another improvement, in 1905, the Belton and Temple Interurban electric railway was completed, providing service between the cities.

During the 1920s, the Ku Klux Klan underwent a revival in Bell County. In many areas, it was concentrated on nativist issues, opposing Catholic and Jewish immigration from eastern and southern Europe. After a scandal involving the leader of the KKK, the group's influence declined markedly by the end of the decade.

In 1925, Miriam A. Ferguson, a native of the county, was inaugurated as the first woman governor of the state. She won re-election in 1932 for a nonconsecutive second term.

The county and state supported founding Temple Junior College in 1926. The entry of the United States in World War II stimulated war spending across the country. In 1942, Fort Hood was opened as a military training base. It drew recruits from across the country.

The postwar period was one of suburbanization in many areas. In 1954, the U.S. Supreme Court ruled in Brown v. Board of Education that racial segregation in public schools, supported by all the taxpayers, was unconstitutional. Two years later, the Killeen school board voted to integrate the local high school. .

The state founded Central Texas College in 1965 in Killeen.

Since the late 20th century, new retail development has taken the form of large malls. In 1976, Temple Mall opened. By 1980, Killeen became the most populous city in Bell County. The following year, the Killeen Mall opened, adding to retail choices in the area. In another type of development, the Bell County Expo Center opened in 1987.

Since the late 20th century, the county has been the site of several notable violent incidents. On October 16, 1991, in the Luby's shooting, George Hennard murdered 23 people and wounded 27 others before killing himself. It was the deadliest mass shooting in the United States at the time. On June 21st, 1999, Brandon Bernard and four accomplices kidnapped and murdered youth pastors Todd and Stacie Bagley near Killeen, Texas. The ringleader, Christopher Vialva, shot the couple before Bernard set their car on fire. Their bodies were found in Belton Lake. Vialva was sentenced to death, and Bernard, also sentenced to death, was executed in 2020. In the 2009 Fort Hood shooting, Army major Nidal Hasan murdered 13 people and wounded 30 others before being paralyzed in return fire. In the 2014 Fort Hood shootings, Army Specialist Ivan Lopez murdered three people and wounded 16 others. On May 3, 2022, a stabbing at Belton High School by a fellow student left 18-year-old Jose Luis "Joe" Ramirez Jr. critically injured. He later died from complications in a local hospital. The suspect, Caysen Tyler Allison, was arrested and charged. On December 21, 2024, John Darrel Schultz, 53, drove a pickup truck through the outside entrance of the JCPenney store at the Killeen Mall during a police chase, striking five people inside before being fatally shot by officers.

== Geography ==
According to the U.S. Census Bureau, the county has a total area of 1,088 square miles (2,820 km^{2}), of which 1,051 square miles (2,720 km^{2}) are land and 37 square miles (96 km^{2}) (3.4%) are covered by water.

=== Adjacent counties ===
- McLennan County (north)
- Falls County (northeast)
- Milam County (southeast)
- Williamson County (south)
- Burnet County (southwest)
- Lampasas County (west)
- Coryell County (northwest)

== Demographics ==
Historical population
Census	Pop.	Note	%±
1860	4,799		—
1870	9,771		103.6%
1880	20,518		110.0%
1890	33,377		62.7%
1900	45,535		36.4%
1910	49,186		8.0%
1920	46,412		−5.6%
1930	50,030		7.8%
1940	44,863		−10.3%
1950	73,824		64.6%
1960	94,097		27.5%
1970	124,483		32.3%
1980	157,889		26.8%
1990	191,088		21.0%
2000	237,974		24.5%
2010	310,235		30.4%
2020	370,647		19.5%
2025 (est.)	402,248	▲	8.5%
U.S. Decennial Census; 1850–2010 2010 2020

=== Racial and ethnic composition ===
Bell County, Texas – Racial and ethnic composition Note: the US Census treats Hispanic/Latino as an ethnic category. This table excludes Latinos from the racial categories and assigns them to a separate category. Hispanics/Latinos may be of any race.
Race / Ethnicity (NH = Non-Hispanic)	Pop 1980	Pop 1990	Pop 2000	Pop 2010	Pop 2020	% 1980	% 1990	% 2000	% 2010	% 2020
White alone (NH)	110,549	124,908	136,241	157,289	156,780	70.02%	65.37%	57.25%	50.70%	42.30%
Black or African American alone (NH)	25,433	34,977	47,344	63,380	80,759	16.11%	18.30%	19.89%	20.43%	21.79%
Native American or Alaska Native alone (NH)	590	792	1,297	1,484	1,448	0.37%	0.41%	0.55%	0.48%	0.39%
Asian alone (NH)	3,352	5,178	5,935	8,350	10,884	2.12%	2.71%	2.49%	2.69%	2.94%
Native Hawaiian or Pacific Islander alone (NH)	x	x	1,005	2,245	3,454	x	x	0.42%	0.72%	0.93%
Other race alone (NH)	558	238	479	500	2,063	0.35%	0.12%	0.20%	0.16%	0.56%
Mixed race or Multiracial (NH)	x	x	5,972	9,977	21,792	x	x	2.51%	3.22%	5.88%
Hispanic or Latino (any race)	17,407	24,995	39,701	67,010	93,467	11.02%	13.08%	16.68%	21.60%	25.22%
Total	157,889	191,088	237,974	310,235	370,647	100.00%	100.00%	100.00%	100.00%	100.00%

=== American Community Survey 2025 data ===
The United States Census Bureau estimated that in 2025, Bell County’s population was 402.248. It was also estimated that the county's population was 40,20% Non-Hispanic White, 28,80% Hispanic or Latino, 21,80% Non-Hispanic Black, 3,20% Asian, 0,50% Native American, 0,90% Pacific Islander, and 4,60% Multiracial.

Total	Population	Percentage
Non-Hispanic White	161.704	40,20%
Hispanic or Latino	115.848	28,80%
Non-Hispanic Black	87.690	21,80%
Asian	12.872	3,20%
Native American	2.011	0,50%
Pacific Islander	3.620	0,90%
Non-Hispanic Multiracial	18.503	4,60%

=== 2020 census ===
As of the 2020 census, the county had a population of 370,647. The median age was 32.7 years; 26.6% of residents were under the age of 18 and 11.9% of residents were 65 years of age or older. For every 100 females there were 95.2 males, and for every 100 females age 18 and over there were 92.5 males age 18 and over.

The racial makeup of the county was 48.7% White, 23.0% Black or African American, 0.9% American Indian and Alaska Native, 3.1% Asian, 1.0% Native Hawaiian and Pacific Islander, 8.9% from some other race, and 14.4% from two or more races. Hispanic or Latino residents of any race comprised 25.2% of the population.

86.3% of residents lived in urban areas, while 13.7% lived in rural areas.

There were 135,673 households in the county, of which 37.2% had children under the age of 18 living in them. Of all households, 48.5% were married-couple households, 17.6% were households with a male householder and no spouse or partner present, and 27.8% were households with a female householder and no spouse or partner present. About 24.8% of all households were made up of individuals and 7.7% had someone living alone who was 65 years of age or older.

There were 147,599 housing units, of which 8.1% were vacant. Among occupied housing units, 55.2% were owner-occupied and 44.8% were renter-occupied. The homeowner vacancy rate was 2.1% and the rental vacancy rate was 9.0%.

=== 2010 census ===
As of the 2010 census, 310,235 people, 114,035 households, and 80,449 families resided in the county. The population density was 295.2 people per square mile (114.0 people/km^{2}). The 125,470 housing units averaged 88 units per square mile (34/km^{2}). The racial makeup of the county was 61.4% White, 21.5% Black, 0.8% Native American, 2.8% Asian, 0.8% Pacific Islander, and 5.0% from two or more races. About 21.6% of the population was Hispanic or Latino of any race; 14.9% were of Mexican, 3.6% were of Puerto Rican, 0.2% Cuban, and 0.2% were of Dominican descent.

As of the 2010 census, about 3.6 same-sex couples per 1,000 households were in the county.

=== 2000 census ===
As of the 2000 census, there were 85,507 households, of which 40.10% had children under the age of 18 living with them, 56.60% were married couples living together, 12.30% had a female householder with no husband present, and 27.50% were not families. About 22.30% of all households were made up of individuals, and 6.50% had someone living alone who was 65 years of age or older. The average household size was 2.68 and the average family size was 3.14.

The population was distributed as 28.90% under the age of 18, 13.40% from 18 to 24, 31.90% from 25 to 44, 17.00% from 45 to 64, and 8.80% who were 65 years of age or older. The median age was 29 years. For every 100 females, there were 100.80 males. For every 100 females age 18 and over, there were 99.30 males.

The median income for a household in the county was $36,872, and for a family was $41,455. Males had a median income of $28,031 versus $22,364 for females. The per capita income for the county was $17,219. About 9.70% of families and 12.10% of the population were below the poverty line, including 16.30% of those under age 18 and 9.80% of those age 65 or over.

== Education ==
Bell County is served by several school districts:

- Academy Independent School District
- Bartlett Independent School District (partial)
- Belton Independent School District
- Bruceville-Eddy Independent School District (partial)
- Copperas Cove Independent School District (partial)
- Florence Independent School District (partial)
- Gatesville Independent School District (partial)
- Holland Independent School District (partial)
- Killeen Independent School District (partial)
- Lampasas Independent School District (partial)
- Moody Independent School District (partial)
- Rogers Independent School District (partial)
- Rosebud-Lott Independent School District (partial)
- Salado Independent School District
- Temple Independent School District
- Troy Independent School District

Areas in the boundary of Central Texas College's service area, as defined by the Texas Education Code, include all of Killeen ISD, Fort Hood and North Fort Hood, and the Bell County portions of Copperas Cove ISD and Lampasas ISD.

Areas in the boundary of Temple Junior College's service area include Academy ISD, Bartlett ISD, Belton ISD, Holland ISD, Rogers ISD, Salado ISD, Temple ISD, and Troy ISD.

State legislation does not specify the community colleges of the Bruceville-Eddy ISD and Moody ISD areas.

== Transportation ==
=== Major highways ===
These major highways run through Bell County:

- Interstate 14
- Interstate 35
- U.S. Highway 190
- State Highway 36
- State Highway 53
- State Highway 95
- State Highway 195
- State Highway 201
- State Highway 320
- Loop 121
- Loop 363
- Spur 172
- Spur 290

=== Mass transit ===
The Hill Country Transit District operates a regularly scheduled fixed-route bus service within the urban areas of Killeen and Temple, as well as a paratransit service throughout the county. Amtrak also has scheduled service to Temple.

== Communities ==
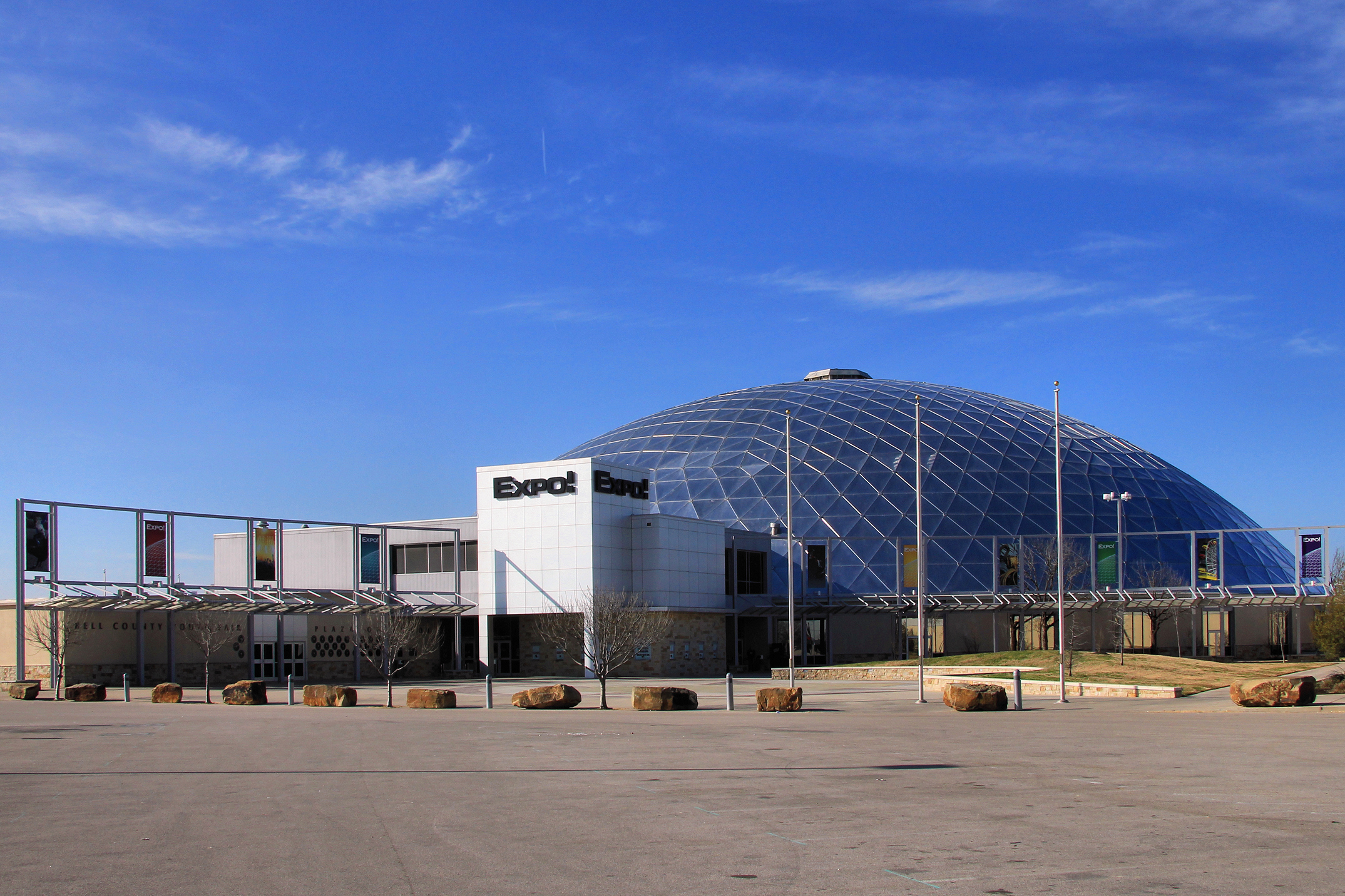
The Bell County Expo Center, located off Interstate Highway 35 north of Belton

=== Cities ===
- Bartlett (partly in Williamson County)
- Belton (county seat)
- Copperas Cove (mostly in Coryell County and a small part in Lampasas County)
- Harker Heights
- Holland
- Killeen (largest city)
- Little River-Academy
- Morgan's Point Resort
- Nolanville
- Rogers
- Temple
- Troy

=== Village ===
- Salado

=== Census-designated place ===
- Fort Hood (partly in Coryell County)
- Pendleton

=== Unincorporated communities ===
- Airville
- Belfalls
- Cedar Valley
- Cyclone
- Ding Dong
- Dangerfield
- Edgeworth
- Heidenheimer
- Joe Lee
- Leedale
- Maxdale
- Meeks
- Moffat
- New Colony
- Oenaville
- Oscar
- Owl Creek
- Prairie Dell
- Ratibor
- Red Ranger
- Seaton
- Sparks
- Stampede
- Summers Mill
- Union Grove
- Vilas
- White Hall
- Youngsport
- Zabcikville

=== Ghost towns ===
- Bland
- Brookhaven
- Donahoe
- Ocker
- Old Troy
- Stringtown
- Sparta
- Tennessee Valley
- Old Aiken
- Pendletonville

== Government and politics ==
United States presidential election results for Bell County, Texas
Year	Republican		Democratic		Third party(ies)	
Year	No.	%	No.	%	No.	%
1912	128	4.01%	3,024	94.68%	42	1.31%
1916	356	8.54%	3,615	86.75%	196	4.70%
1920	483	7.94%	3,595	59.12%	2,003	32.94%
1924	1,632	17.26%	7,273	76.91%	552	5.84%
1928	3,366	52.17%	3,079	47.72%	7	0.11%
1932	724	8.67%	7,607	91.06%	23	0.28%
1936	475	7.17%	6,119	92.42%	27	0.41%
1940	1,050	12.40%	7,418	87.60%	0	0.00%
1944	763	8.52%	6,960	77.72%	1,232	13.76%
1948	1,069	11.73%	7,548	82.83%	496	5.44%
1952	4,862	33.86%	9,484	66.05%	12	0.08%
1956	4,285	30.76%	9,603	68.93%	44	0.32%
1960	4,606	30.13%	10,651	69.67%	31	0.20%
1964	2,938	16.78%	14,557	83.13%	17	0.10%
1968	5,705	26.98%	11,893	56.24%	3,547	16.77%
1972	17,525	71.79%	6,848	28.05%	38	0.16%
1976	15,126	45.96%	17,499	53.17%	287	0.87%
1980	20,729	54.72%	15,823	41.77%	1,333	3.52%
1984	31,117	69.52%	13,322	29.76%	323	0.72%
1988	29,382	61.79%	17,751	37.33%	418	0.88%
1992	24,936	45.27%	18,684	33.92%	11,457	20.80%
1996	30,348	53.20%	22,638	39.68%	4,063	7.12%
2000	41,208	65.11%	21,011	33.20%	1,072	1.69%
2004	52,135	65.39%	27,165	34.07%	424	0.53%
2008	49,242	54.36%	40,413	44.61%	935	1.03%
2012	49,574	57.36%	35,512	41.09%	1,339	1.55%
2016	51,998	54.33%	37,801	39.50%	5,902	6.17%
2020	67,893	53.17%	57,014	44.65%	2,783	2.18%
2024	75,161	57.52%	53,973	41.31%	1,528	1.17%

United States Senate election results for Bell County, Texas1
Year	Republican		Democratic		Third party(ies)	
Year	No.	%	No.	%	No.	%
2024	70,468	54.47%	55,441	42.85%	3,463	2.68%

United States Senate election results for Bell County, Texas2
Year	Republican		Democratic		Third party(ies)	
Year	No.	%	No.	%	No.	%
2020	68,934	54.36%	54,413	42.91%	3,457	2.73%
2026	50,887	45.99%	56,562	51.12%	3,197	2.89%

Texas Gubernatorial election results for Bell County
Year	Republican		Democratic		Third party(ies)	
Year	No.	%	No.	%	No.	%
2022	51,888	59.01%	34,785	39.56%	1,263	1.44%
2026	54,723	49.18%	54,047	48.57%	2,503	2.25%

Politically, Bell County tends to support Republican Party candidates for office. It has voted for the Republican presidential nominee every cycle beginning with Ronald Reagan in 1980. While the county had been trending Democratic, it rebounded in 2024 to give Republicans their strongest performance in 20 years. This is partially attributed to the large military presence, which tends to lean Republican, as well as the growth of Hispanics in the county, a population that shifted heavily towards Republicans in 2024.

The county is a bellwether for Texas, voting for the statewide winner of every presidential election in Texas, except in 1952 and 1956. In 1952 and 1956, Republican Dwight D. Eisenhower (who was born in Texas) won the state while losing Bell County.

Democratic strength in the county is concentrated in the city of Killeen, which gave Joe Biden 63.4% of the vote in the 2020 election. The remainder of the county, particularly the cities of Belton and Temple, is much more strongly Republican.

=== County government ===
==== Bell County elected officials ====
Position	Name	Party
County Judge	David Blackburn	Republican
Commissioner, Precinct 1	Russell Schneider	Republican
Commissioner, Precinct 2	Bobby Whitson	Republican
Commissioner, Precinct 3	Greg Reynolds	Republican
Commissioner, Precinct 4	Louie Minor	Democratic
District Attorney	Stephanie Newell	Republican
District Clerk	Joanna Staton	Republican
County Attorney	James E. Nichols	Republican
County Clerk	Shelley Coston	Republican
Sheriff	Bill Cooke	Republican
Tax Assessor-Collector	Shay Luedeke	Republican
Treasurer	Gaylon Evans	Republican
County Court-at-Law #1	Paul Motz	Republican
County Court-at-Law #2	John Mischtian	Republican
County Court-at-Law #3	Rebecca DePew	Republican
27th Judicial District Court	Debbie Garrett	Republican
146th Judicial District Court	Mike Russell	Republican
169th Judicial District Court	Cari L. Starritt-Burnett	Republican
264th Judicial District Court	Paul L. LePak	Republican
426th Judicial District Court	Steve Duskie	Republican
478th Judicial District Court	Wade Faulkner	Republican
Peace Justice, Pct. 1	Theodore R. Duffield	Republican
Peace Justice, Pct. 2	Cliff Coleman	Republican
Peace Justice, Pct. 3 Pl. 1	Rosanne Fisher	Republican
Peace Justice, Pct. 3 Pl. 2	Larry Wilkey	Republican
Peace Justice, Pct. 4 Pl. 1	Gregory Johnson	Democratic
Peace Justice, Pct. 4 Pl. 2	Nicola James	Democratic
Constable, Precinct 1	Patricia "Pat" Duffield	Republican
Constable, Precinct 2	Christopher "Chris" Bazar	Republican
Constable, Precinct 3	Devin Rosenthal	Republican
Constable, Precinct 4	Martha Dominguez	Democratic

== See also ==
- List of museums in Central Texas
- National Register of Historic Places listings in Bell County, Texas
- Recorded Texas Historic Landmarks in Bell County
- Hugh Shine, Republican member of the Texas House of Representatives from Bell County
