= Belton Independent School District =

School district in Texas

Location
- Belton, Texas ESC Region 12 USA
- Coordinates: 31°03′29″N 97°27′34″W

District information
- Type: Independent school district
- Grades: Pre-K through 12
- Superintendent: Dr. Malinda Golden
- Schools: 18 (2021-2022)
- NCES District ID: 4809860

Students and staff
- Students: 12,148 (2019-2020)
- Teachers: 600.28 (2009-10) (on full-time equivalent (FTE) basis)
- Student–teacher ratio: 14.76 (2009-10)

Other information
- TEA District Accountability Rating for 2011: Academically Acceptable
- Website: Belton ISD

Belton Independent School District is a public school district based in Belton, Texas (USA).

== Finances ==
As of the 2010–2011 school year, the appraised valuation of property in the district was $1,975,956,000. The maintenance tax rate was $0.117 and the bond tax rate was $0.025 per $100 of appraised valuation.

== Academic achievement ==
In 2011, the school district was rated "academically acceptable" by the Texas Education Agency.

== Schools ==
In the 2021-2022 school year, Belton ISD had eighteen schools open.

=== Regular instructional ===
High Schools (Grades 9-12)

- Belton High School
- Lake Belton High School (Opened in 2020)
- Belton New Tech High School @ Waskow

Middle Schools (Grades 6-8)

- Belton Middle School (2020–present)
- North Belton Middle School (2014–present)
- South Belton Middle School (2011–present)
- Lake Belton Middle School (2005–present)

Elementary Schools (Grades PK/K-5)

- Charter Oak Elementary School (Opened in 2019)
- Joe M. Pirtle Elementary School
- Lakewood Elementary School
- Leon Heights Elementary School
- Southwest Elementary School
- Sparta Elementary School
- Chisholm Trail Elementary School (Opened in 2014)
- Tarver Elementary School
- High Point Elementary School
- James L. Burrell Elementary School (Opened in 2024)
- Hubbard Branch Elementary School (Opened August 2024)
- Belton Early Childhood School (Pre-K only)

=== JJAEP instructional ===
- Bell County JJAEP

=== Previous campuses ===
- Tyler Elementary (1960-2014)
- Belton Jr. High School (1972-2005)
- Central Elementary (1973-1999)
- Tarver Intermediate School (2000-2005)
- Belton Intermediate School (1993-2005)
- Belton Middle School (2005-2014)
- Miller Heights Elementary School (Closed 2024)

== See also ==
- List of school districts in Texas
