= Rogers Independent School District =

School district in Texas

Rogers Independent School District is a public school district based in Rogers, Texas (USA).

Located in Bell County, a small portion of the district extends into Milam County.

In 2009, the school district was rated "academically acceptable" by the Texas Education Agency.

== Schools ==
- Rogers High School (Grades 9-12)
- Rogers Middle School (Grades 6-8)
- Rogers Elementary School (Grades PK-5)
