= Killeen–Temple metropolitan area =

Killeen–Temple
- Metropolitan statistical area
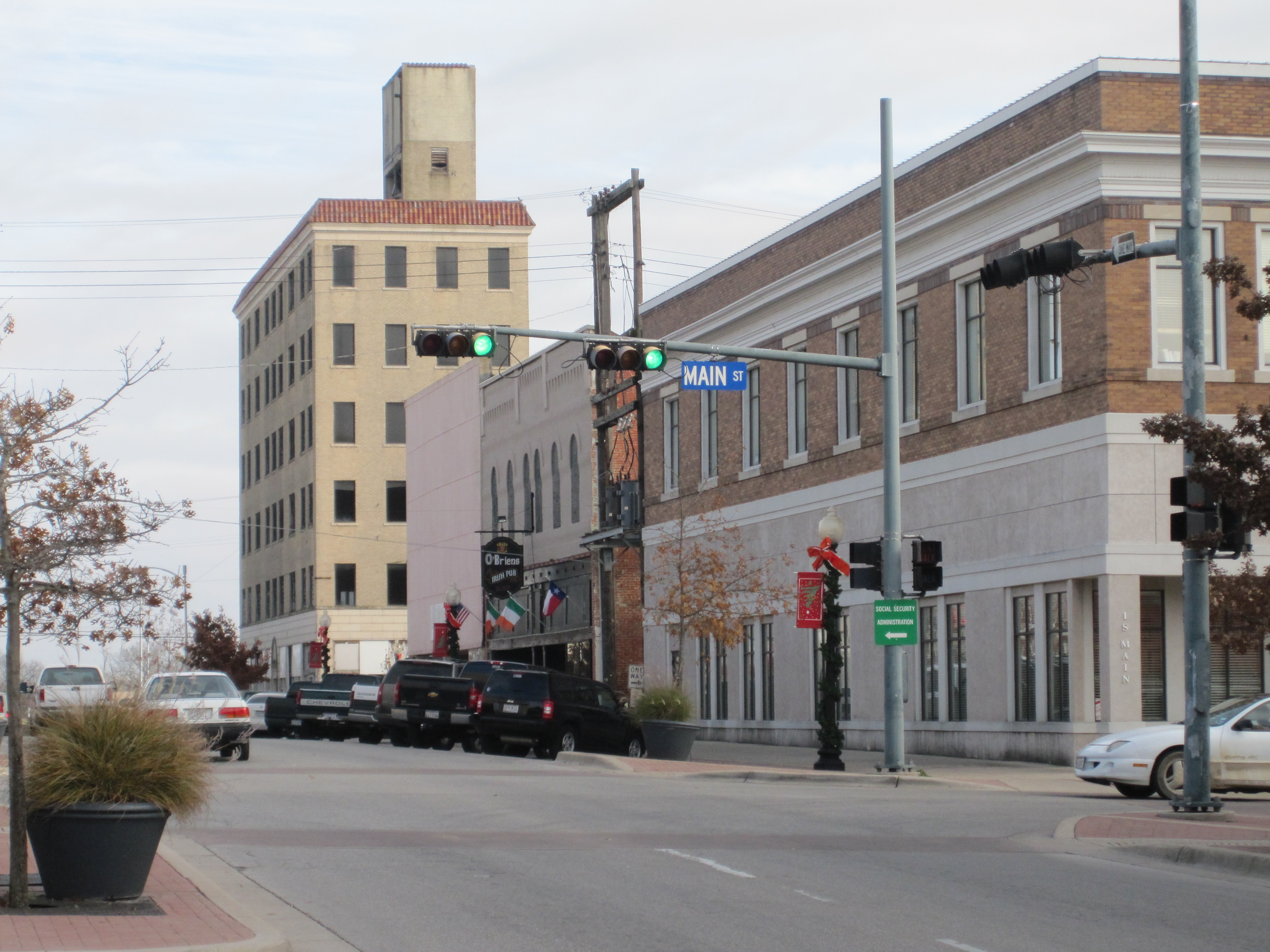
- Downtown Temple at Main Street
Interactive Map of Killeen–Temple, TX MSA
City of Killeen
City of Temple
Fort Hood (fka Fort Cavazos)
Killeen–Temple, TX MSA
- Country: United States
- State: Texas
- Principal cities: Killeen; Temple; Fort Hood

Area
  - Total: 2,815.93 sq mi (7,293.2 km^{2})

Population (2025)
  - Total: 511,497
  - Density: 178/sq mi (69/km^{2})

GDP
  - Total: $24.105 billion (2022)
- Time zone: UTC-6 (CST)
  - Summer (DST): UTC-5 (CDT)

Killeen–Temple is a metropolitan statistical area (MSA) in Central Texas that covers three counties: Bell, Coryell, and Lampasas. As of the 2025 census estimates, the MSA had a population of 511,497.

Similar to how the Dallas–Fort Worth metropolitan area of North Texas is often called the Metroplex, locals sometimes refer to this area as the Centroplex.

== Counties ==
County	Seat	2025 estimate	2020 Census	Change	Area	Density
Bell	Belton	402,248	370,647	+8.53%	1,088 sq mi (2,820 km^{2})	370/sq mi (143/km^{2})
Coryell	Gatesville	85,592	83,093	+3.01%	1,057 sq mi (2,740 km^{2})	81/sq mi (31/km^{2})
Lampasas	Lampasas	23,657	21,627	+9.39%	714 sq mi (1,850 km^{2})	33/sq mi (13/km^{2})
Total		511,497	475,367	+7.60%	2,859 sq mi (7,400 km^{2})	179/sq mi (69/km^{2})

== Communities ==
These cities, towns, and villages are categorized based on the United States Census Bureau 2025 population estimates. No population estimates are released for census-designated places (CDPs), which are marked with an asterisk (*). These places are categorized based on their 2020 Census population.

=== Principal cities ===
- Killeen (161,883)
- Temple (98,412)

=== Places with 20,000 to 50,000 inhabitants ===
- Copperas Cove (40,118)
- Harker Heights (35,195)
- Fort Hood* (28,295)
- Belton (25,964)

=== Places with 1,000 to 20,000 inhabitants ===
- Gatesville (16,422)
- Lampasas (7,988)
- Nolanville (7,983)
- McGregor (partial) (6,405)
- Morgan's Point Resort (4,746)
- Troy (3,585)
- Salado (2,565)
- Little River-Academy (2,020)
- Bartlett (partial) (1,678)
- Kempner (1,297)
- Holland (1,188)
- Rogers (1,101)

=== Places with fewer than 1,000 inhabitants ===
- Pendleton* (845)
- Lometa (794)
- Evant (partial) (467)
- Oglesby (445)
- South Mountain (409)
- Mound* (174)
- Flat* (157)

=== Unincorporated places ===
- Bee House
- Bend (partial)
- Ding Dong
- Heidenheimer
- Izoro
- Jonesboro (partial)
- Leon Junction
- Moffat
- Pidcoke
- Prairie Dell
- Purmela
- White Hall

== Demographics ==
Historical populations
Census	Pop.	Note	%±
1960	118,058		—
1970	159,794		35.4%
1980	214,656		34.3%
1990	255,301		18.9%
2000	330,714		29.5%
2010	405,300		22.6%
2020	475,367		17.3%
2025 (est.)	511,497		7.6%
U.S. Decennial Census

As of the 2020 census, 475,367 people, 155,894 households, and 106,779 families were residing within the MSA. The racial makeup of the MSA was 52.0% White (non-Hispanic White 45.9%), 19.6% African American, 0.9% Native American, 2.7% Asian, 1.0% Pacific Islander, 8.6% from other races, and 13.9% from two or more races. Hispanics or Latinos of any race were 24.0% of the population.

The median income in the MSA for a household was $36,349 and for a family was $40,386. Males had a median income of $27,529 versus $21,396 for females. The per capita income for the MSA was $16,271.

== Media ==
=== Print ===
Both Killeen and Temple have their own newspapers, the Killeen Daily Herald and the Temple Daily Telegram.

=== TV ===
Television stations (shared with Waco) include:

- KCEN-TV 6 (NBC)
- KWTX-TV 10 (CBS/Telemundo)
- KXXV 25 (ABC)
- KWKT-TV 44 (Fox)
- KNCT 46 (The CW)
- KAKW-DT 62 (Univision) (O&O)

=== Radio ===
- KTON 1330 (simulcasts on 100.9 and 93.9 FM) (ESPN)
- KTEM 1400 (Simulcast on 94.3 FM) (talk)
- KVLT 88.5 (K-Love)
- KBDE 89.9 (American Family Radio)
- KNCT-FM 91.3 (easy listening)
- KIIZ-FM 92.3 (urban contemporary)
- KMYB-LP 95.1 (Killeen Independent School District)
- KJHV-LP 96.3 (LifeTalk Radio)
- KWTX-FM 97.5 (Top 40)
- KRGN-LP 98.5 (gospel)
- WACO-FM 99.9 (country)
- KLTD 101.7 (Spanish adult hits)
- KSSM 103.1 (urban adult contemporary)
- KVBM-LP 104.7 (LifeTalk Radio) (Killeen) / KRYH-LP 104.7 (Three Angels Broadcasting Network) (Temple)
- KUSJ 105.5 (country)
- KOOC 106.3 (rhythmic contemporary)
- KOOV 106.9 (EWTN)
- KLFX 107.3 (active rock)

=== Cable and satellite ===
For cable and satellite service, Killeen and Temple are served by Spectrum, DirecTV, Dish Network, and Grande Communications.

== See also ==
- List of cities in Texas
- Texas census statistical areas
- List of Texas metropolitan areas
- Texas Triangle
