= Priddy High School =

Location
- 1378 SH 16 North; Priddy, Texas 76870-0040; United States; 31.675875°N 98.509267°W

Information
- School type: Public high school
- School district: Priddy Independent School District
- Principal: Adrianne Burden
- Teaching staff: 14.91 (on an FTE basis)
- Grades: PK-12
- Enrollment: 118 (2023-24)
- Student to teacher ratio: 7.91
- Colors: Blue and gold
- Athletics conference: UIL Class A
- Mascot: Pirate
- Website: Priddy High School website

Priddy High School or Priddy School is a 1A public high school located in Priddy, Texas, United States. It is part of the Priddy Independent School District located in northeastern Mills County. In 2011, the school was rated "Recognized" by the Texas Education Agency.

== Athletics ==
The Priddy Pirates compete in these sports:

- Basketball
- Cross country
- Golf
- Tennis
- Track and field

=== State titles ===
- Girls basketball
  - 2003(1A/D1) Also won Texas Cup.
- Boys cross country
  - 1994(1A), 1995(1A), 2015(1A)

==== State finalist ====
- Girls basketball
  - 1985(1A)
