= Mullin High School =

Location
- 403 Bulldog Drive; Mullin, Texas 79505; United States; 31.556003°N 98.670644°W

Information
- School type: Public high school
- School district: Mullin Independent School District
- Principal: Joe Branham
- Grades: 7-12
- Enrollment: 92 (2023-2024)
- Colors: Purple, gold, and white
- Athletics conference: UIL Class A
- Mascot: Bulldog
- Website: Mullin High School website

Mullin High School or Mullin School is a public high school located in Mullin, Texas, United States and classified as a 1A school by the UIL. It is part of the Mullin Independent School District located in northwest Mills County. Mullin School has all grades (K-12) on one campus. In 2015, the school was rated "Met Standard" by the Texas Education Agency.

== Athletics ==
The Mullin Bulldogs compete in the following sports -

- Basketball
- 6-Man Football
- Golf
- Tennis
- Track and Field
- Volleyball

== See also ==
- List of high schools in Texas
