= Bozar =

Bozar may refer to:

- Bozar, Texas
- The Centre for Fine Arts, Brussels (French: Palais des Beaux-Arts, Dutch: Paleis voor Schone Kunsten)
- 12270 Bozar, a minor planet
