= Antelope Gap, Texas =

Ghost town in Texas, US

- Ghost town
- Location in Texas
- Coordinates: 31.2876658°N 98.4494825°W
- Country: United States
- State: Texas
- County: Mills
- Elevation: 1,460 ft (445 m)

Antelope Gap is a ghost town in Mills County, Texas, United States. Situated on U.S. Route 183, it was named for the Antelope Gap stream. The town was settled c. 1884 on a stop of the Gulf, Colorado and Santa Fe Railway, in what was Lampasas County at the time. A post office operated there from 1892 to 1914. At its peak in the 1890s, it was a farming community with a population of 75. It was abandoned some time in the 20th century.
