= Williams Ranch, Texas =

- Ghost town
- Location of Williams Ranch in Texas
- Coordinates: 31°29′53″N 98°38′22″W
- Country: United States
- State: Texas
- County: Mills County
- Established: 1855
- Named for: John Williams
- Elevation: 1,200 ft (370 m)
- GNIS feature ID: 1954383

Williams Ranch is a ghost town located in Mills County, Texas, and is considered the oldest community in the county. It is named after John Williams, who settled there in 1855 when the area was in Brown County, Texas. The location is about 3 miles (4.8 km) south of Mullin, and 8 miles (13 km) northwest of Goldthwaite, the county seat.

== History ==
In 1855, Tennessee native John Williams (1804–1871) was traveling from Missouri through Texas when he discovered a group of springs near Mullin Creek. Impressed with the location, he bought some land from a fellow whose last name was Williams (W.W. Williams) decided to stay and established a ranch on the springs. Another source recognizes a man with the last name "Russell" as the first settler of the town. The reason the town is called Williams Ranch is because all of John Williams sons had ranches there. During the next ten years, a community grew around Williams Ranch consisting of a number of homes, the Florida Hotel (the first in the area before Mills County), a general store, a school (the first public school in the area that would become Mills County), a few saloons, and a number of other businesses, including a stage stop. A post office operated in Williams Ranch from 1877 to 1892. It was also the site of the first mill in western Brown County, established near a spring. The mill was built in 1877 or 1888 by J.D. Williams, a son of the first settler, John Williams. A road from Austin to Fort Concho, now San Angelo, passed through Williams Ranch. The town probably reached its peak in 1881-1884 when it had a population of about 250 people. It also was very commercially active during 1872-1875 as a major center for western cattle trade. J.C. Combs, a Baptist from Mississippi, started the first church. Confederate General Robert E. Lee passed through the community with troops that were relocating from Indianola to Fort Griffin. A telegraph line connecting Austin to Fort Concho passed through the town and was operated by Hallie Hutchinson, the nine-year-old daughter of the Florida Hotel owner. The telegraph line was essential in keeping the authorities in Austin apprised of activities in the West. Conflict erupted between the older settlers and newer settlers, leading to organizing the "Honest Man's Club." The club eventually resorted to violence, leading to a counter group being formed, the "Trigger Mountain Mob." The activities of these two groups signaled a period of mob violence that terrorized the area.

The reason the town died was out of greed, because the railroad was going to go through there, but the people raised the price of their lands too high, so the railroad bypassed Williams Ranch, Texas. Outlaw John Wesley Hardin met Deputy Sheriff Charles Webb in Williams Ranch about a month before Hardin killed Webb. By the 1880s, the community had about 250 residents. Its demise began when it was bypassed by the Santa Fe Railroad in 1885 but more for the reason of the feud that existed between the town's original settlers and its newcomers.

A petition leading to the legislation that formed Mills County specified Williams Ranch as the county seat.

Today, there is ample evidence of what was once a thriving ranching community including a well-maintained cemetery. The Allen family presently owns property adjacent to the cemetery and are local historians.

== Geography ==
Williams Ranch is sited near Mullin Creek, which rises in central Mills County and runs southwest for 12 miles to join on Brown Creek. The settlement served as a stage stop on The Wire Road, a dirt road running from Austin to Fort Phantom Hill near Abilene named for the telegraph line which was the first communication line between Austin and the military outpost. The local terrain is characterized by steep slopes and benches, surfaced by shallow clay loams or sandy soils, which support juniper, live oak, mesquite, and grasses.
