= Bozar, Texas =

- Unincorporated community
- Location within Texas Location within the United States
- Coordinates: 31°31′01″N 98°35′49″W
- Country: United States
- State: Texas
- County: Mills
- Elevation: 1,421 ft (433 m)
- Time zone: UTC-6 (Central (CST))
  - Summer (DST): UTC-5 (CDT)
- Area code: 325
- GNIS feature ID: 1377172

Bozar is an unincorporated community in Mills County, Texas, United States.

== History ==
Bozar had a store and a station on the Gulf, Colorado and Santa Fe Railway as late as 1936. In 2000, Bozar's population was nine.

== Geography ==
Bozar is located on U.S. Route 84 and U.S. Route 183 midway between Goldthwaite and Mullin. Lake Merritt is also located near the community.

== Education ==
Bozar is served by the Goldthwaite Independent School District.
