= Cowhouse Creek =

Location
- Country: United States
- State: Texas

Physical characteristics
- Mouth
  - location: 31.1956°N 97.6132°W

Cowhouse Creek is a river in Texas.

The stream rises west of Priddy in Mills County. Cowhouse Creek runs southeast for approximately 90 miles through Mills, Hamilton, and Coryell counties, flowing into Belton Lake north of Nolanville.

== See also ==
- List of rivers of Texas
