= Scallorn, Texas =

Scallorn
- Unincorporated community
- Location within Texas Location within the United States
- Coordinates: 31°19′47″N 98°28′27″W
- Country: United States
- State: Texas
- County: Mills
- Elevation: 1,529 ft (466 m)
- Time zone: UTC-6 (Central (CST))
  - Summer (DST): UTC-5 (CDT)
- Area code: 325
- GNIS feature ID: 1380501

Scallorn is an unincorporated community in Mills County, Texas, United States. Scallorn is located along a BNSF Railway line and is near U.S. Route 183. Scallorn was founded along what was then the Gulf, Colorado and Santa Fe Railway in 1888. The community was named after Gid Scallorn, the foreman of a nearby ranch. Scallorn had a post office from 1918 to 1932. In 1949, Scallorn abandoned its railway station; the town had a population of twenty-five at the time.
