= Mullin Independent School District =

School district in Texas

Coordinates: 31.555°N 98.6703°W

Mullin Independent School District is a public school district based in Mullin, Texas (USA). It is mainly located in Mills County with small portions extending into Brown and Comanche counties.

It has two campuses including Mullin High School (grades 7–12) and Mullin Elementary School (grades PK–6).

== Academic achievement ==
In 2009, the school district was rated "recognized" by the Texas Education Agency.

== Special programs ==
=== Athletics ===
Mullin High School plays six-man football.

== See also ==
- List of school districts in Texas
- List of high schools in Texas
