= Lake Merritt (Texas) =

- Location within Texas Location within the United States
- Location: Mills County, Texas
- Coordinates: 31°31′56″N 98°34′39″W
- Type: reservoir
- Surface elevation: 1,453 ft (443 m)

Lake Merritt (also Brown's Creek) is a small, private manmade lake on Brown's Creek, located about 7 miles (11 km) north of Goldthwaite, Texas in Mills County. Initially constructed by the Santa Fe Railway Company as a reservoir for their steam engines, the lake is now used for recreation. Found at an elevation of 1,453 feet (443 m).

== History ==
The lake was built in 1915 by the Santa Fe Railway Company (ATSF: Atchison, Topeka, and Santa Fe) as a holding reservoir for water to supply steam engines on the nearby railway line, which ran roughly 3.5 miles (5.6 km) west of Lake Merritt at Bozar; “Merritt” was most likely the name of an ATSF railroad engineer. After the demise of the steam engine, the lake was sold to a group of private investors who purchased the lake property as a recreational project, the Mills County Hunting and Fishing Club. Although the lake was intended for the exclusive use of Club shareholders, there was little enforcement, and local residents, especially teenagers, frequented the lake for fishing and swimming.

=== Potential water source ===
In the 1960s, the Goldthwaite city council considered Lake Merritt as the city's main water supply; however, after consulting an engineering firm, the council abandoned the Lake Merritt proposition and chose the Colorado River instead.

== Brown's Creek ==
Although Lake Merritt is listed on some maps (such as ACME Mapper 2.0) as Brown's Creek (the creek to which it connects), the lake's official name has been Lake Merritt since its construction.

Brown's Creek is a tributary of the Pecan Bayou; the mouth of Brown's Creek is at the bridge over Pecan Bayou on Ranch Road #574 west of Goldthwaite. The Pecan Bayou itself is one of many tributaries of the Colorado River.

== Current status ==
The lake remains in operation, with some retirement community development along the shorelines. A lake keeper resides on the west side of the lake near the bath house and meeting building. The lake has a nominal "four-boat" limit.
