= Priddy Independent School District =

School district in Texas

Priddy Independent School District is a public school district based in the community of Priddy, Texas (USA).

Located in Mills County, a very small portion of the district extends into Comanche County.

Priddy ISD has one school that serves students in grades Kindergarten through Twelve.

In 2009, the school district was rated "recognized" by the Texas Education Agency.
