= Mullin, Texas =

- Town
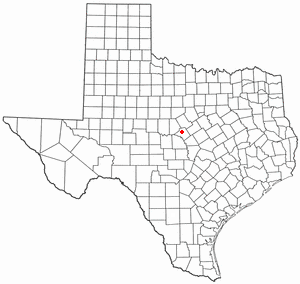
- Location of Mullin, Texas

- Coordinates: 31°33′19″N 98°39′56″W
- Country: United States
- State: Texas
- County: Mills

Area
  - Total: 0.47 sq mi (1.21 km^{2})
  - Land: 0.47 sq mi (1.21 km^{2})
  - Water: 0 sq mi (0.00 km^{2})
- Elevation: 1,431 ft (436 m)

Population (2020)
  - Total: 130
  - Density: 280/sq mi (110/km^{2})
- Time zone: UTC-6 (Central (CST))
  - Summer (DST): UTC-5 (CDT)
- ZIP code: 76864
- Area code: 915
- FIPS code: 48-49992
- GNIS feature ID: 2413029

Mullin is a town in Mills County in northwestern Central Texas, United States. The population was 130 at the 2020 census.

== Geography ==
According to the United States Census Bureau, the town has a total area of 0.5 square miles (1.3 km^{2}), all land.

=== Climate ===
The climate in this area is characterized by hot, humid summers and generally mild to cool winters. According to the Köppen Climate Classification system, Mullin has a humid subtropical climate, abbreviated "Cfa" on climate maps.

== Demographics ==
Historical population
Census	Pop.	Note	%±
1920	558		—
1930	459		−17.7%
1940	404		−12.0%
1950	326		−19.3%
1960	219		−32.8%
1970	203		−7.3%
1980	213		4.9%
1990	194		−8.9%
2000	175		−9.8%
2010	179		2.3%
2020	130		−27.4%
U.S. Decennial Census; 2020 Census

As of the census of 2000, there were 175 people, 69 households, and 48 families residing in the town. The population density was 376.5 inhabitants per square mile (145.4/km^{2}). There were 84 housing units at an average density of 180.7 per square mile (69.8/km^{2}). The racial makeup of the town was 90.86% White, 8.57% from other races, and 0.57% from two or more races. Hispanic or Latino of any race were 9.71% of the population.

There were 69 households, out of which 27.5% had children under the age of 18 living with them, 56.5% were married couples living together, 7.2% had a female householder with no husband present, and 30.4% were non-families. 26.1% of all households were made up of individuals, and 15.9% had someone living alone who was 65 years of age or older. The average household size was 2.54 and the average family size was 3.08.

In the town, the population was spread out, with 28.6% under the age of 18, 4.6% from 18 to 24, 19.4% from 25 to 44, 25.1% from 45 to 64, and 22.3% who were 65 years of age or older. The median age was 42 years. For every 100 females, there were 94.4 males. For every 100 females age 18 and over, there were 108.3 males.

The median income for a household in the town was $24,167, and the median income for a family was $28,182. Males had a median income of $23,333 versus $19,375 for females. The per capita income for the town was $10,088. About 25.8% of families and 34.7% of the population were below the poverty line, including 47.9% of those under the age of eighteen and 18.9% of those 65 or over.

== Education ==
The Town of Mullin is served by the Mullin Independent School District and is home to the Mullin High School Bulldogs.

== Notable person ==
- Belve Bean, professional baseball pitcher
