= Priddy, Texas =

Unincorporated community in Texas, US

Coordinates: 31°40′24″N 98°30′22″W

Priddy is an unincorporated community and Census-designated place in Mills County in northwestern Central Texas, United States. As of the 2020 census, Priddy had a population of 150. The community was established in the late 19th century, and was named after Thomas Jefferson Priddy.

The Priddy Independent School District serves area students.

== Climate ==
The climate in this area is characterized by relatively high temperatures and evenly distributed precipitation throughout the year. The Köppen Climate System describes the weather as humid subtropical, and uses the abbreviation Cfa.

Climate data for Priddy, Texas
Month	Jan	Feb	Mar	Apr	May	Jun	Jul	Aug	Sep	Oct	Nov	Dec	Year
Mean daily maximum °C (°F)	21 (69)	24 (75)	28 (83)	32 (90)	36 (97)	39 (102)	38 (101)	37 (99)	35 (95)	31 (87)	25 (77)	21 (69)	31 (87)
Mean daily minimum °C (°F)	1 (34)	4 (39)	8 (46)	12 (54)	17 (63)	22 (72)	23 (74)	22 (72)	19 (67)	13 (56)	6 (43)	2 (36)	13 (55)
Average precipitation mm (inches)	7.6 (0.3)	10 (0.4)	5.1 (0.2)	10 (0.4)	18 (0.7)	38 (1.5)	51 (2)	46 (1.8)	43 (1.7)	25 (1)	10 (0.4)	13 (0.5)	270 (10.8)
Source: Weatherbase

== Demographics ==
Historical population
Census	Pop.	Note	%±
2020	150		—
U.S. Decennial Census; 1850–1900 1910; 1920 1930 1940; 1950 1960 1970; 1980 1990 2000; 2010 2020

Priddy first appeared as a census designated place in the 2020 U.S. census.

=== 2020 census ===
Priddy CDP, Texas – Racial and ethnic composition Note: the US Census treats Hispanic/Latino as an ethnic category. This table excludes Latinos from the racial categories and assigns them to a separate category. Hispanics/Latinos may be of any race.
Race / Ethnicity (NH = Non-Hispanic)	Pop 2020	% 2020
White alone (NH)	97	64.67%
Black or African American alone (NH)	0	0.00%
Native American or Alaska Native alone (NH)	0	0.00%
Asian alone (NH)	0	0.00%
Native Hawaiian or Pacific Islander alone (NH)	0	0.00%
Other race alone (NH)	0	0.00%
Mixed race or Multiracial (NH)	13	8.67%
Hispanic or Latino (any race)	40	26.67%
Total	150	100.00%
