= Mills County, Texas =

County in Texas, United States

- County
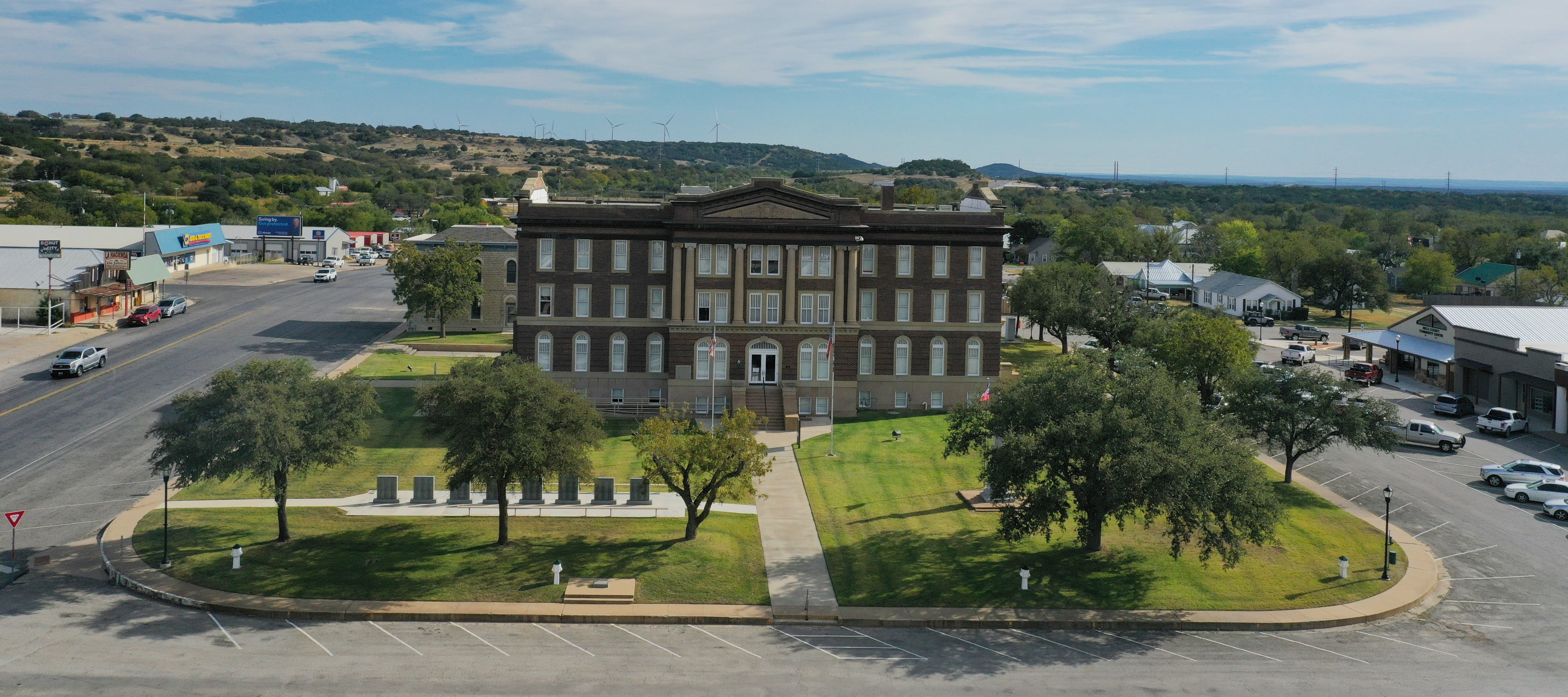
- Mills County Courthouse (north side)

- Seal
- Motto: Meat Goat Capital of America
- Location within the U.S. state of Texas
- Coordinates: 31°30′N 98°35′W
- Country: United States
- State: Texas
- Founded: March 15, 1887
- Named for: John T. Mills
- Seat: Goldthwaite
- Largest city: Goldthwaite

Government
  - County Judge: Jett Johnson

Area
  - Total: 749.8 sq mi (1,942 km^{2})
  - Land: 748.2 sq mi (1,938 km^{2})
  - Water: 1.6 sq mi (4.1 km^{2}) 0.2%

Population (2020)
  - Total: 4,456
  - Estimate (2025): 4,580 ▲
  - Density: 6/sq mi (2.3/km^{2})
- Time zone: UTC−6 (Central)
  - Summer (DST): UTC−5 (CDT)
- ZIP Codes: 76844, 76864, 76890, 76870, 76880
- Area code: 325
- Congressional district: 11th
- Website: www.millscountytx.gov

Mills County is located in Texas, United States. It was created on March 15, 1887, from parts of four existing counties in Central Texas—Brown, Comanche, Hamilton, and Lampasas—and named after John T. Mills. The 2020 census reported a population of 4,456. Its county seat is Goldthwaite. A long-time resident of the county quipped that residing here is the closest a person could get to living in Mayberry.

== History ==
The Clovis are the earliest known people to inhabit the territory before Mills County, though recent discoveries indicate that people were living in the area as far back as 15,000 to 20,000 years. More recently, the Tonkawa occupied it, and numerous vestiges from their campsites remain across the county, including cooking middens. Thought to be the first White man to explore the area, Pedro Vial, visited in 1786 and 1789 while traveling between San Antonio and Santa Fe. Captain Henry S. Brown, believed to be the first white visitor, led a group to the area in 1825 to recover stolen stock. Between 1835 and 1850, the eastern part of what was to become Mills County was once encompassed by the Mexican municipality Milam (originally Viesca Municipality); the western part of the county was once a part of Bexar County between 1839 and 1848, then within Travis County between 1848 and 1852.

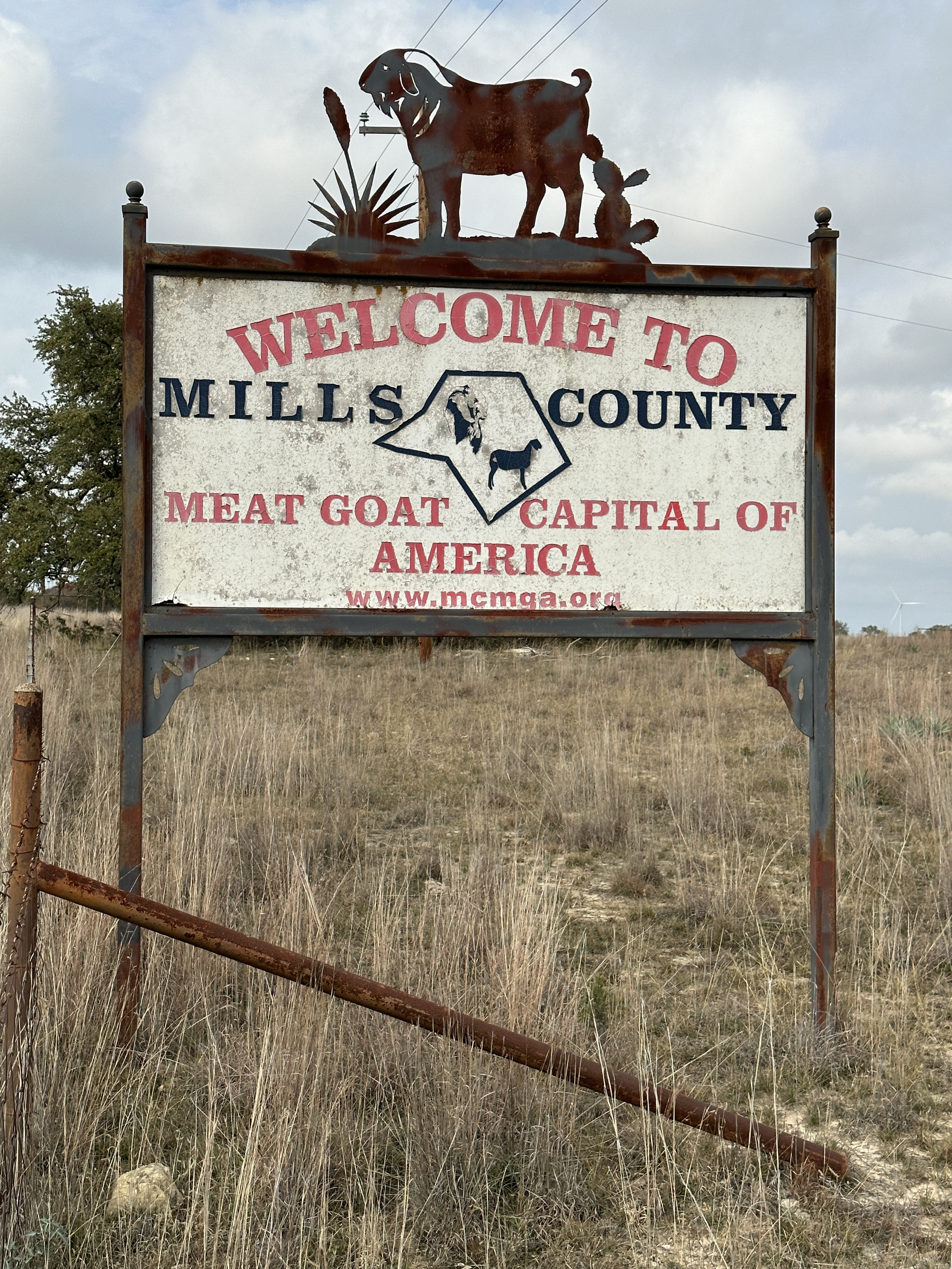
"Welcome to Mills County, Meat Goat Capital of America" roadside sign

The Comanche regularly hunted in what became Mills County, since it was located along the southeastern edge of a large buffalo range. Native tribes moved through the area via what locals called the Comanche Trail, which led to South Texas. Starting in the 1840s, aggressive groups of Comanche and Apache pushed the Tonkawa out and raided the area in an effort to keep control of it as late as 1850, frequently stealing horses and scalping settlers who had started to move there in significant numbers after 1855. The earliest settlers arrived when the area had no fences and land was free.

Eventually, the Apache moved west, leaving the Comanche in control. Earlier, in 1835, the general council of Texas sent the first Texas Rangers to aid settlers. In 1854, the Texas Legislature appropriated land located on the Texas frontier, built a series of reservations, and moved the natives there starting in 1855, yet native incursions into White settlements continued. By the mid-1870s, native violence began to diminish, yet leading up to the 1880s, Comanche and Kiowa continued to attack the area. Comanches raided Williams Ranch in the late 1870s, the last recorded assault in the area.

The earliest communities in were Center City and Hanna Valley, both organized in 1854. One source identifies the David Morris Sr., and Dick Jenkins families as the first pioneers in the area, who settled south of present-day Center City in 1852. Killed by the natives, Dick Jenkins is thought to be the first person buried in what was to become Mills County.

Williams Ranch, established in 1855 in Brown County, was the first community that developed into a large, dynamic town after establishing trade with Mexico and serving as a major center for cattle business, capitalizing on its location near the Western Cattle Trail. The town served as the "headquarters" of the West Texas frontier and was expected to serve as the county seat. Old Fort Phantom Hill Road, the only military route that crossed Mills County, passed through Williams Ranch, connecting Austin and Fort Phantom Hill, located north of Abilene. In 1876, a telegraph line was built along the road, later to be known as the "Wire Road". The Florida Hotel (locally referred to as the Hutch Hotel) at Williams Ranch hosted a telegraph office operated by Hallie Hutchinson, the first woman telegraph operator in the U.S. The telegraph line connected Austin and Fort Concho. It was eventually replaced by a telephone line that was thought to be the longest in the United States.

A federal military facility, Camp Colorado, was established in 1856 near the community of Ebony. Numerous wagon and stage coach trails crisscrossed the area during this time. Phantom Hill Road, a military transportation and communications route that connected Fort Phantom Hill with Army headquarters in Austin, also passed through the territory.

During the Civil War and following Reconstruction, an unprecedented number of people moved west looking for a better life, attracted by plentiful and inexpensive land. Some of them settled in the area before Mills County formed and helped establish the early communities. Records demonstrate that 1876 marked the largest influx of immigrants into the area.

Most of the early settlers lived according to Christian principles they brought with them that were reinforced by religious leaders in their new communities. That said, gun altercations to settle differences were common, and legal repercussions were usually immaterial.

This isolated part of Texas, popularly referred to as a no-man's land, also attracted a variety of criminals, and minimal and often corrupt law enforcement allowed crime to surge. The first law officer was W.W. Queen, who took his position in 1883 before Mills County formed; no reliable records document the existence of law enforcement officers before then. Other sustained problems roiled the area, including native incursions, conflicts related to the cattle business, community feuds, agrarian discontent, and political unrest. This tumultuous environment was a crucible for violence. Only a few pioneers joined the Confederate Army during the Civil War because they were needed at home to fight their own "war" against the attacks of natives and outlaws.

Originally organized to protect settlers, vigilante "committees" formed with the tacit approval of law officials that degenerated into thieving, vindictive, and murderous groups that terrorized the area, killing an estimated 100 people during their reign in Central Texas. Also known as The Assembly, they were veiled in secrecy and bound by a strict code of silence, which heightened settlers' fear. The earliest one started at Williams Ranch in 1869, called the Honest Man's Club, that was supposed to rid the town of criminals. Soon, a feud erupted between it and the Trigger Mountain Mob, which was the salvo that launched the mob's rule. Groups operating in Mills County were sometimes collectively referred to as the Mills County Mob. The mob's control of the area started to subside with the arrival of the railroad in 1887, which helped usher in civilization. The Texas Rangers were eventually called to the territory in 1890 to quell the mob's depravities, though its activity continued into the early 20th century.

By 1885, the area had reached a population of 6,493 and had become civilized enough to justify forming a new county. At the time, the only significant communities were Center City, Mullin, Star, and Williams Ranch. Both Goldthwaite and Mullin were only tent villages.

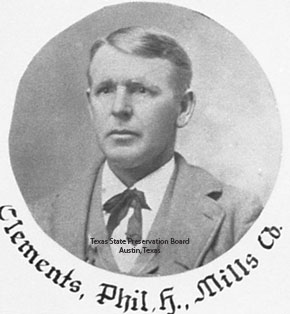
Phil H. Clements, "Father of Mills County"

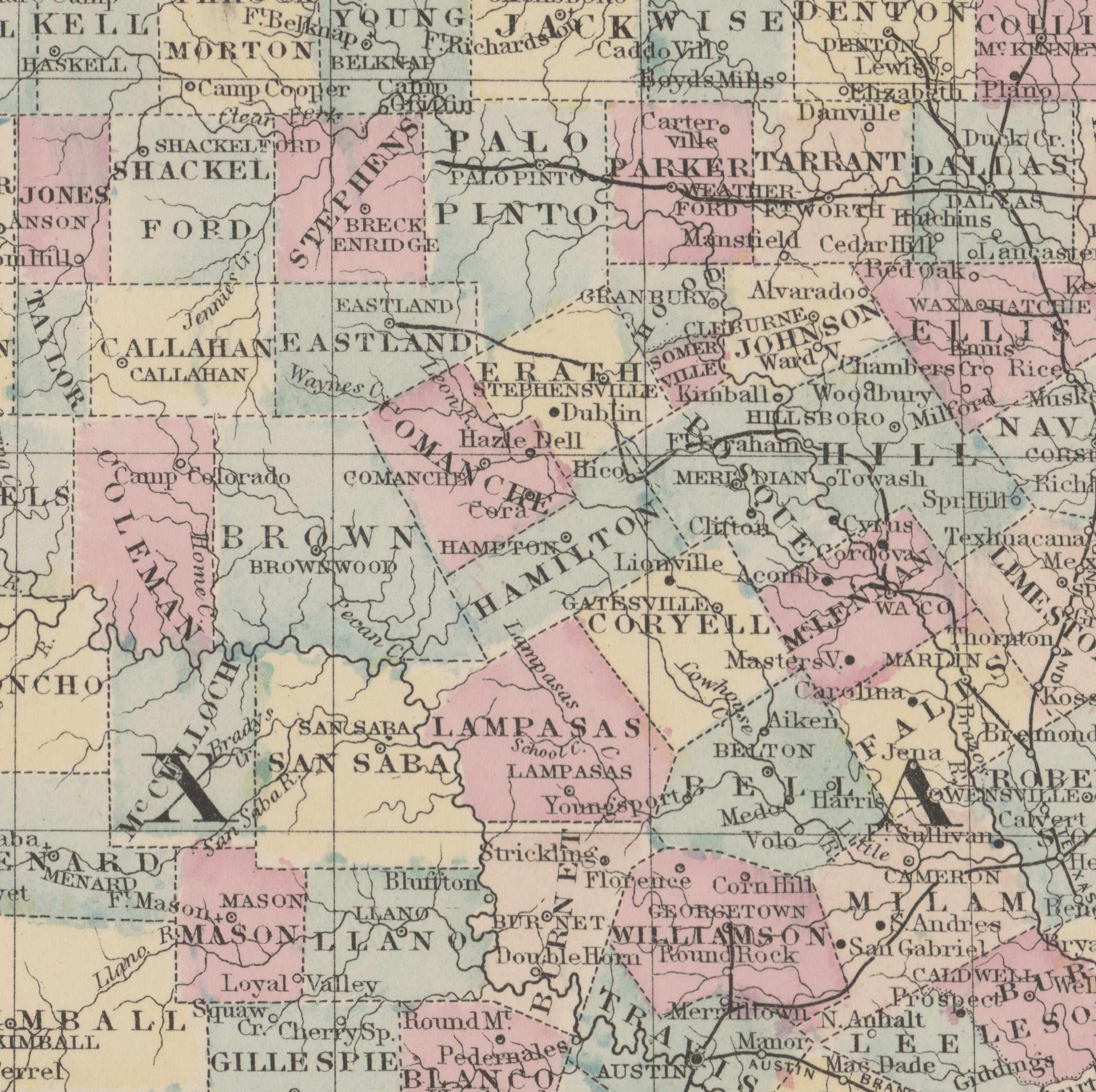
An 1880 county map of Texas detail showing existing counties before Mills County was created

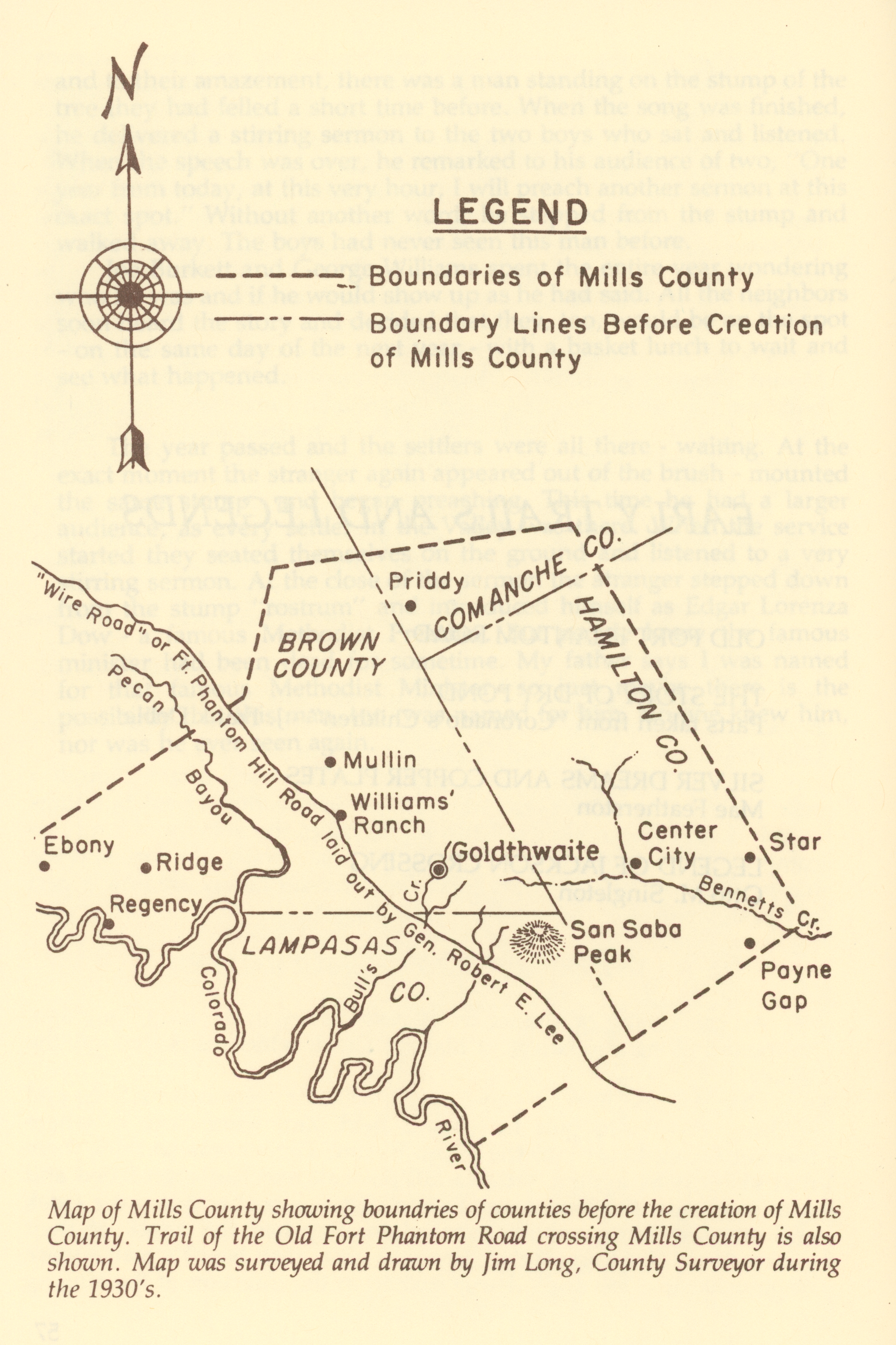
Map showing which parts of existing counties were used to create Mills County

Mills County map, 1888

Known as the Father of Mills County, district representative and Williams Ranch resident Phil H. Clements (1854–1932) lobbied in Austin for a new county in 1887, though planning for the county had started in 1885. Clements served as the first Mills County clerk and later served as county judge, county commissioner, and postmaster in Goldthwaite. He once wrote that Mills County was "the best all-the-year-round section of Texas." Opposition to creating the new county arose; Brown County, in particular, fought against it.

In an action of the 20th Texas Legislature, Governor L.S. "Sul" Ross approved H.S.S.B. No. 85 on March 15, 1887, which carved Mills County out of parts of Brown, Comanche, Hamilton, and Lampasas Counties—all of which were created much earlier in the mid-to-late 1850s. It was named after John T. Mills, honoring his service as a Republic of Texas Supreme Court justice. The bill provided directions for conducting an election to determine government leaders and the location of the county seat.

Brown County Commissioners Court met on July 25, 1887, with Brown County Judge R.P. Conner presiding, to began organizing the government of Mills County. The court created five justices' precincts and four commissioners' precincts, and assigned 10 residents to carry out the county's first election of its officials. The 10 voting places and election administrators were: Mullin, M.C. Kirkpatrick; Jon Ward's house, A.N. Perkins; Center City, F.M. Ragsdale; Parson Priddy's house, A.P. Kelly; Goldthwaite, John James; Pleasant Grove School house on Sims Creek, Phil McCormick; Big Valley, M.V. Nowell; Rock Springs, J.E. McGowan; Regency, Sam Jones; and Buffalo School house, H.G. Ratliff. The winners of the election met with Judge Conner on Monday, September 12, 1887, in Goldthwaite, to take oaths and began their duties. September 12, 1887, is recognized as the date the county was organized. The first elected officials of county were: J.B. Head, county judge; G.H. Dalton, commissioner, precinct 1; D.S. Kelly, commissioner, precinct 3; S.M. Moore, commissioner, precinct 4; George W. Cunningham, sheriff; and Phil H. Clements, county clerk. A special election held on October 10, 1889, determined Goldthwaite as the county seat, beating Mullin and Pegtown. The first legal actions at the Mills County clerk's office was to issue a marriage license and to file a divorce suit, and both transactions were instigated by Black couples.

An earlier piece of legislation, House Bill No. 421, would have created a county with a similar boundary as Mills called Key, but the bill was defeated on February 21, 1881. An early General Land Office map dated March 10, 1879, references Mills County and names a place in the center of the county, Winona.

== Geography and Natural Features ==
Located in west-central Texas near the center of the state, Mills County incorporates portions of the Limestone Cut Plain and Western Cross Timber subregions of the Cross Plains ecoregion. According to the U.S. Census Bureau, the county has a total area of 750 square miles (1,900 km^{2}), of which 1.5 sq mi (3.9 km^{2}) (0.2%) are covered by water. Elevation varies from 1,200 to 1,750 ft above meal sea level.

The Brazos and Colorado river basins bifurcate the county. Major surface water features include the Colorado River, the Colorado-Brazos basin divide, the Pecan Bayou-Colorado confluence, Lake Merritt, and the headwaters of the Cowhouse Creek, Lampasas River, Bennet Creek, and Simms Creek. The county's major aquifer is the Trinity, but others include the Hickory and the Ellenberger-San Saba (southern Mills County) and the Cross Timbers (western Mills County). The Colorado River marks the county's distinctive southwestern border and creates these fertile farming valleys: Big Valley, Jones Valley, and Hanna Valley. The Pecan Bayou enters the western part of the county from Brown County, then flows east and south towards the Colorado River; Blanket and Brown Creeks unite into the Pecan Bayou along the way. From west to east, these streams drain into the Colorado River: Comanche Creek, Buffalo Creek, Rough Creek, King Creek, Pecan Bayou, Prescott Creek, Bull Creek, Nabors Creek, and Shaw Creek. North and South Bennett Creeks and Simms Creek, all in the eastern part of the county, drain into the Lampasas River. The northern parts of the county have Mountain Creek, Cowhouse Creek, and Washboard Creek that eventually drain into the Brazos River.

The county's topography features low, broken hills. The Cowhouse Mountains, which are part of an extensive range of hills located in the Lampasas Cut Plain, cross the county from the southeast to the northwest. One part of the Cowhouse Range enters the county north of Star and leaves the county north of Priddy; another part of Cowhouse enters the county near Moline before taking a northwesterly exit into Comanche County. San Saba Peak, at a height of 1,712 feet, a prominent mountain in the county, was named in 1732 by Don Juan Antonio Bustillo y Cevallos, the Spanish governor of Texas.

Central Texas, which includes Mills County, contains some of the oldest rocks in the state.

The county has a variety of soils, including gray loams, sandy dark and stone clay, and alluvia in the bottom lands, and black wax on the prairies. Very shallow to deep, loamy, and clayey soils and their subvarieties make up the bulk of the county's soils. Plentiful limestone, sand, and gravel are used for road construction.

Native timbers include live oak (entire county), post oak (entire county), Spanish oak (Grand Prairie Region), eastern cottonwood (along streams), shinnery oak (Cowhouse Mountains Region), mesquite (concentrated in western county), pecan (along streams), and junipers (locally called cedars). Cactus varieties typically grow in the Cross Timbers Region. Dominant trees and shrubs include ashe juniper (Juniperus ashei J. Bucholz), escarpment live oak (Quercus fusiformis Small), and the deciduous shrub, honey mesquite (Prosopis glandulosa Torr). A member of the Cypress family, Ashe juniper is one of six species of the Juniperus genus that grow in Texas, but it is the only one that grows in the Hill Country, including Mills County, where it is concentrated in the southern region. It is the most plentiful native tree growing in the county and has existed in the area for thousands of years. Both ashe juniper and honey mesquite are considered to be pest trees in the area.

The county flower is the Texas plume standing cypress.

=== Adjacent counties ===
- Brown County (northwest)
- Comanche County (north)
- Hamilton County (northeast)
- Lampasas County (southeast)
- San Saba County (southwest)

== Climate ==
Mills County typically offers hot summers and cool winters. Rainfall tends to be spread throughout the year, and snowfall is infrequent. The county typically receives 25-26 inches of rain a year based on historical records. Records show a high historical yearly rainfall of 26.75 inches. Yearly rainfall for 2023-2025 was above average: 28.85 inches in 2023; 34.7 inches in 2024; and 32.3 inches in 2025. Averaging 14 miles per hour, prevailing winds come from the south-southeast. The county's growing season last 230 days. The Köppen Climate Classification for Goldthwaite, the county seat, is "humid subtropical" (Cfa).

Highest monthly precipitation was 13.71 inches, recorded in October 2018.

One long-time county resident recalls the acute droughts of 2011 and the seven-year drought that occurred in the 1950s.

Climate data for Goldthwaite, Mills County, Texas
Month	Jan	Feb	Mar	Apr	May	Jun	Jul	Aug	Sep	Oct	Nov	Dec	Year
Record high °F (°C)	88 (31)	98 (37)	98 (37)	99 (37)	103 (39)	107 (42)	108 (42)	110 (43)	108 (42)	97 (36)	90 (32)	85 (29)	110 (43)
Mean daily maximum °F (°C)	58.8 (14.9)	62.6 (17.0)	70.4 (21.3)	78.4 (25.8)	83.9 (28.8)	89.7 (32.1)	93.7 (34.3)	93.8 (34.3)	87.6 (30.9)	78.8 (26.0)	68.3 (20.2)	60.1 (15.6)	77.2 (25.1)
Mean daily minimum °F (°C)	33 (1)	37.4 (3.0)	44.2 (6.8)	53.6 (12.0)	61.9 (16.6)	68.4 (20.2)	70.9 (21.6)	71 (22)	65.3 (18.5)	55.2 (12.9)	44.3 (6.8)	35.1 (1.7)	53.5 (11.9)
Record low °F (°C)	4 (−16)	—	8 (−13)	28 (−2)	40 (4)	50 (10)	57 (14)	53 (12)	40 (4)	26 (−3)	12 (−11)	−7 (−22)	−7 (−22)
Average rainfall inches (mm)	1.6 (41)	1.9 (48)	1.9 (48)	2.7 (69)	3.9 (99)	3.4 (86)	1.7 (43)	2 (51)	2.9 (74)	3 (76)	1.9 (48)	1.6 (41)	28.6 (730)
Average snowfall inches (cm)	.7 (1.8)	.4 (1.0)	.1 (0.25)	—	—	—	—	—	—	—	.1 (0.25)	—	—

== Communities ==
- Bethel - one of a trio of towns located near each other that also included North Bennett and Liveoak
- Big Valley - located near the Colorado River in the southwestern part of the county; once in Lampasas County; settled as early as 1859; divided into Upper Big Valley and Lower Big Valley; since the early 1870s, identified as the "backbone" of Mills County agricultural production; upper and lower valley schools consolidated about 1921, when a new school building was erected; post office discontinued in the early 1900s; known as the "Gateway to San Saba County"; citizens left the lower valley in the early 1940s when the land became a one-thousand acre pecan orchard owned by the Leonard Brothers
- Bull's Creek - an early settlement started by James (Jim) Bull near the eponymous creek south of Goldthwaite around 1859; its school was started in 1899 before consolidating with Fairview to form Cedar Knob in 1917; it also had a cemetery
- Caradan - originally known as "Lookout"; established in 1898 and named after Sam Caraway and Dan Bush, both early settlers; Lookout School built around 1878; Live Oak School District recognized in 1888; Midway School was the result of the consolidation of North Bennett and Gray in 1913, consolidated with Goldthwaite in 1947
- Cedar Knob - early settlers were W.N. Sullivan and A.C. Sullivan, sheep farmers; schoolhouse erected that also served as church and prompted renaming the community "Fairview"; school consolidated with Bull's Creek and called "Cedar Knob" before finally consolidating with Goldthwaite
- Center City - located ten miles east of Goldthwaite and first known as Hughes Store. It was named for an old oak tree, "center oak," that an 1870s survey identified as the center of Texas. The first Justice Court proceedings, presided over by Judge J.P. Grundy, were carried out between 1887 and 1890 under the tree before Mills County formed. The tree also furnished shade for the first school classes. In the early 1870s, many expected Center City to be named county seat as a logical choice based on its history as a hub for freight and stage line. A town square plan was developed by Mr. and Mrs. Hughes that accommodated a courthouse, and eventually a list of businesses sprung up, including several saloons, a drug store, two blacksmith shops, a hotel, and several other stores. It was a centrally located resting point for postal carriers. Its first church was organized in 1875 and was used for school and lodge. During its peak, the population is estimated to have reach 1,000 citizens. Likewise, residents anticipated the railroad to pass through the town, but it did not.
- Chappell Hill - an influx of settlers effected it being created out of the North Brown Community; an early member of the community was Mrs. B.T. Boydson, who moved there in 1893; mountainous part of the county; only schoolhouse constructed 1898–1899;
- Chesser Valley - was located about six miles from Williams Ranch; named after John Dan Chesser; known for hosting camp meetings/revivals that attracted large groups that camped in nearby Live Oak groves; once had the largest school in Brown County with fifty students
- Duren - located six miles northeast of Mullin; named after Philip David Duren, who first settled in Williams Ranch in 1876 but bought land where Duren would be located; in the 1870s through late 1880s, land owners in Duren would pay property taxes in three counties: Comanche, Brown and Mills; the school district was known as Pompey Mountain School District No. 6; two successive buildings served as the school (Duren School) and church (Pompey Mountain), and in 1961 a new church building opened.
- Ebony - Originally in Brown County and located in the far western part of Mills County with the Colorado River as its southern border, Ebony's earliest settler was James Ransom Wilmeth Sr.; settlers came in numbers starting in the mid-1870s; called "Buffalo Valley" until the post office arrived between 1891 and 1894, with the name "Ebony" supplied by the postal service (earlier, mail came from Regency); a series of schools starting with one located near Buffalo Creek and the Reeves School; those schools consolidated in 1912 and culminated with the construction of a new school that was built across from the cemetery; the school consolidated with Mullin in 1947 (or 1949); the community started declining in the late 1930s after it was claimed by Camp Bowie in Brownwood and used as a military training area.
- Goldthwaite
- Hanna Valley - located near the Colorado River and established by David Hanna in 1854; first permanent settlement; Hanna assisted in starting Brown County; his daughter is thought to be the first white child born in would later become Mills County; it also hosted the first post office in the area in 1875.
- Hogg - organized by J.L. Spurlin and planned to be located nine miles from Center City, two miles from Lometa, and twelve miles from Goldthwaite
- Jones Valley/Ratler - located west of Goldthwaite near the Colorado River; started growing around the 1900; had a school which consolidated with Goldthwaite; once the home of Willis Mill and associated vineyard.
- Kelly - located near Pleasant Grove and eight miles southeast of Goldthwaite, Kelly was in Lampasas County before Mills County formed. Its only community building was a school, named after Dan Kelly and his son, Neal, that also served as a church known as "Sims Creek Baptist"; it burned in 1909 and was rebuilt the same year; later it was burned and rebuilt; school consolidated with Goldthwaite in the early 1940s. The community was also called "Polecat."
- Lake Merritt - located about seven miles north of Goldthwaite with about 190 square acres of land; construction of the lake began in 1915 to supply water to the Santa Fe Railroad; the Lake Merritt School was built in 1919 and consolidated with North Brown and Cryer schools; in 1933 the school consolidated with Trigger Mountain school to establish the New Lake Merritt School
- Liveoak - one of a trio of towns located near each other that also included North Bennett and Bethel; its school consolidated with Goldthwaite in 1940
- Miller Grove - located about six miles southwest of Goldthwaite [or four and one-half miles northwest of Goldthwaite?], the community once had an eponymously named school, first name the "Hunt School."
- Mount Olive - located about ten miles northeast of Goldthwaite; began developing around 1890 and named after John Neal, who was the first permanent settler in 1887; church building used as a school; its school consolidated with Goldthwaite in 1949.
- Mullin
- Nabors Creek - settled c. 1870; named after the sheepherder who settled it when it was in Lampasas County; bordered to the south and west by the Colorado River; first schoolhouse built around 1900; the school consolidated with Golthwaite in 1947
- North Bennett - one of a trio of towns located near each other that also included Bethel and Liveoak; students from North Bennett attended Midway, which consolidated with Goldthwaite in 1947
- Payne Gap - was located southeast of Goldthwaite; Barzilla Payne arrived in 1856 and established it after signing for pre-empted land in 1857; Payne was scalped by the Comanches in 1863.
- Pleasant Grove - established around 1862 based on the arrival of its earliest known settler, Joe Curtis. The community had a school which was enlarged to three rooms in 1933–1934; it closed in 1946; a spring-fed pool called "Blue Hole" was a major center of pioneer life in the area.
- Priddy
- Regency
- Ridge - located about fifteen miles west of Goldthwaite and home to the "hanging tree," where a horse thief (Sebe Arnold) was hung; originally created by Mills County Commissioners court in 1888 as "Cold Springs"; began known as Ridge after the post office was established sometime between 1917 and 1920; a succession of four schoolhouses existed there, the final one built in 1931; much of the land was taken by Camp Bowie in Brownwood during WWII
- Rock Springs - located five miles west of Goldthwaite and north of Hanna Valley Road, where five springs provided water; the first to settle there was John Tisdale in 1874; the last school building was built in 1894, and the school consolidated with Goldthwaite in 1946
- Rye Valley - settled around 1881in an area bound to the south and southeast close to a horseshoe bend of the Colorado River; known for its fertile land and for the large rye grass the settlers found there; had a school, which burned once and moved several times in its history before locating centrally in 1919
- Scallorn - originally called Antelope Gap and located in southern Mills County, originally in Lampasas County; had a schoolhouse, which burned in 1905 and rebuilt; school district was the Minor School District, which merged with Goldthwaite in 1937 before combining with Lometa in 1943; Antelope Gap named Scallorn after the post office arrived and name after "Gid" Scallorn, foreman of the C-Ranch, once the largest ranch in Mills County
- South Bennett - established around 1870 and located about six miles southeast of Goldthwaite; named after South Bennett Creek; its school consolidated with Goldthwaite in the late 1930s; a jaguar was killed in 1903 near the community by Henry Morris, the only one killed in Mills County
- Star
- Tater Hill
- Trigger Mountain Community - located about five miles north of Goldthwaite near Trigger Mountain, which was named after Welcome Chandler's horse, "Trigger." Following an Indian attack, the horse was found on top of the mountain. Chandler would later become a founder of Brownwood. The community had a church and school.
- Washboard - named after the eponymous formation of Washboard Creek in northern Mills County, about three miles west of Indian Gap, Hamilton County; the first settlers arrived in the 1860s; in the mid-1930s, the school consolidated with Priddy
- Williams Ranch

== Demographics ==
County Population History
Census	Pop.	Note	%±
1890	5,493		—
1900	7,851		42.9%
1910	9,694		23.5%
1920	9,019		−7.0%
1930	8,293		−8.0%
1940	7,951		−4.1%
1950	5,999		−24.6%
1960	4,467		−25.5%
1970	4,212		−5.7%
1980	4,477		6.3%
1990	4,531		1.2%
2000	5,151		13.7%
2010	4,936		−4.2%
2020	4,456		−9.7%
2025 (est.)	4,580	▲	2.8%
1850–2010 2020 2024

=== 2020 census ===
As of the 2020 census, the county had a population of 4,456. The median age was 50.1 years. 19.9% of residents were under the age of 18 and 29.8% of residents were 65 years of age or older. For every 100 females there were 99.1 males, and for every 100 females age 18 and over there were 95.7 males age 18 and over.

The racial makeup of the county was 82.0% White, 0.7% Black or African American, 0.3% American Indian and Alaska Native, 0.1% Asian, <0.1% Native Hawaiian and Pacific Islander, 6.4% from some other race, and 10.4% from two or more races. Hispanic or Latino residents of any race comprised 16.3% of the population.

<0.1% of residents lived in urban areas, while 100.0% lived in rural areas.

There were 1,843 households in the county, of which 26.0% had children under the age of 18 living in them. Of all households, 55.5% were married-couple households, 16.9% were households with a male householder and no spouse or partner present, and 24.3% were households with a female householder and no spouse or partner present. About 27.6% of all households were made up of individuals and 16.3% had someone living alone who was 65 years of age or older.

There were 2,529 housing units, of which 27.1% were vacant. Among occupied housing units, 80.0% were owner-occupied and 20.0% were renter-occupied. The homeowner vacancy rate was 3.2% and the rental vacancy rate was 10.7%.

Mills County Demographics - 2020 US Census
Population		
Population Estimates, July 1, 2021, (V2021)	4,480*	*
Population estimates base, April 1, 2020, (V2021)	4,456	*
Population, percent change - April 1, 2020 (estimates base) to July 1, 2021, (V2021)	0.5%*	*
Population, Census, April 1, 2020	4,456	
Population, Census, April 1, 2010	4,936	
Age and Sex		
Persons under 5 years, percent	4.1%	*
Persons under 18 years, percent	21.0%	*
Persons 65 years and over, percent	27.6%	*
Female persons, percent	48.8%	*
Race and Hispanic Origin		
White alone, percent	94.9%	*
Black or African American alone, percent	1.5%	*a
American Indian and Alaska Native alone, percent	1.2%	*a
Asian alone, percent	0.6%	*a
Native Hawaiian and Other Pacific Islander alone, percent	0.1%	*a
Two or More Races, percent	1.7%	*
Hispanic or Latino, percent	19.5%	*b
White alone, not Hispanic or Latino, percent	77.2%	*
Population Characteristics		
Veterans, 2016-2020	345	
Foreign born persons, percent, 2016-2020	6.9%	
Housing		
Housing units, July 1, 2021, (V2021)	2,532	
Owner-occupied housing unit rate, 2016-2020	88.2%	
Median value of owner-occupied housing units, 2016-2020	$141,700.00	
Median selected monthly owner costs -with a mortgage, 2016-2020	$908.00	
Median selected monthly owner costs -without a mortgage, 2016-2020	$438.00	
Median gross rent, 2016-2020	$649.00	
Building permits, 2021	NA	
Families and Living Arrangements		
Households, 2016-2020	1,752	
Persons per household, 2016-2020	2.69	
Living in same house 1 year ago, percent of persons age 1 year+, 2016-2020	89.4%	
Language other than English spoken at home, percent of persons age 5 years+, 2016-2020	15.6%	
Computer and Internet Use		
Households with a computer, percent, 2016-2020	85.3%	
Households with a broadband Internet subscription, percent, 2016-2020	76.5%	
Education		
High school graduate or higher, percent of persons age 25 years+, 2016-2020	82.8%	
Bachelor's degree or higher, percent of persons age 25 years+, 2016-2020	21.1%	
Health		
With a disability, under age 65 years, percent, 2016-2020	11.3%	
Persons without health insurance, under age 65 years, percent	26.3%	
Economy		
In civilian labor force, total, percent of population age 16 years+, 2016-2020	52.3%	
In civilian labor force, female, percent of population age 16 years+, 2016-2020	48.2%	
Total accommodation and food services sales, 2017 ($1,000)	3,639	
Total health care and social assistance receipts/revenue, 2017 ($1,000)	9,035	
Total transportation and warehousing receipts/revenue, 2017 ($1,000)	2,320	
Total retail sales, 2017 ($1,000)	62,223	
Total retail sales per capita, 2017	$12,639.00	
Transportation		
Mean travel time to work (minutes), workers age 16 years+, 2016-2020	17.4	
Income and Poverty		
Median household income (in 2020 dollars), 2016-2020	$50,198.00	
Per capita income in past 12 months (in 2020 dollars), 2016-2020	$27,619.00	
Persons in poverty, percent	14.4%	
Business		
Total employer establishments, 2020	110	
Total employment, 2020	942	
Total annual payroll, 2020 ($1,000)	35,790	
Total employment, percent change, 2019-2020	13.1%	
Total nonemployer establishments, 2019	549	
All employer firms, Reference year 2017	91	
Geography		
Population per square mile, 2020	6.0	
Population per square mile, 2010	6.6	
Land area in square miles, 2020	748.23	
Land area in square miles, 2010	748.26	
* = Estimates are not comparable to other geographic levels due to methodology differences that may exist between different data sources.		
a = Includes persons reporting only one race		
b = Hispanics may be of any race, so also are included in applicable race categories		

A 2022 report showed that home values in Mills County increased at a record rate compared to other counties in the state, rising by 98.7% since November 2017. An average home ballooned from $179,000 to over $355,000.

=== Historical racial and ethnic composition ===
Mills County, Texas – Racial and ethnic composition Note: the US Census treats Hispanic/Latino as an ethnic category. This table excludes Latinos from the racial categories and assigns them to a separate category. Hispanics/Latinos may be of any race.
Race / Ethnicity (NH = Non-Hispanic)	Pop 1980	Pop 1990	Pop 2000	Pop 2010	Pop 2020	% 1980	% 1990	% 2000	% 2010	% 2020
White alone (NH)	4,112	4,029	4,367	4,024	3,498	91.85%	88.92%	84.78%	81.52%	78.50%
Black or African American alone (NH)	5	10	61	26	25	0.11%	0.22%	1.18%	0.53%	0.56%
Native American or Alaska Native alone (NH)	9	4	13	15	10	0.20%	0.09%	0.25%	0.30%	0.22%
Asian alone (NH)	18	1	4	10	4	0.40%	0.02%	0.08%	0.20%	0.09%
Native Hawaiian or Pacific Islander alone (NH)	x	x	0	1	0	x	x	0.00%	0.02%	0.00%
Other race alone (NH)	7	3	0	0	6	0.16%	0.07%	0.00%	0.00%	0.13%
Mixed race or Multiracial (NH)	x	x	35	42	185	x	x	0.68%	0.85%	4.15%
Hispanic or Latino (any race)	326	484	671	818	728	7.28%	10.68%	13.03%	16.57%	16.34%
Total	4,477	4,531	5,151	4,936	4,456	100.00%	100.00%	100.00%	100.00%	100.00%

== Religion ==
Early settlers in the mid-1850s represented a range of faiths, led in numbers by the Methodists. During the county's formation days, denominations were less important. Early sermons were delivered by circuit riders, and a Methodist rider delivered the first religious service at the home of Charles Mullin in 1857. Later brush arbor revivals became popular before camp meetings started attracting congregants.

A 1972 study canvassing citizens of Star and Center City revealed that a majority of citizens had Protestant fundamentalist spiritual beliefs, with over 80% affiliated with Baptist, Methodist, or Church of Christ denominations.

The Mills County Historical Commission details fifty-seven cemeteries in Mills County. Early settlers buried their dead near their homes in post oak slabs fashioned into coffins by the local carpenter.

Mills County churches
Name	Denomination	Town	Established	Retired	Notes
Center City Baptist Church	Baptish	Center City			
Center City Methodist Church	Methodist	Center City			
Methodist Church	Methodist	Ebony			Located near Regency
Baptist Church	Baptist	Ebony			
Church of Christ	Church of Christ	Ebony			
Assembly of God	Assembly of God	Goldthwaite			
First Baptist Church	Baptish	Goldthwaite			
First United Methodist Church	Methodist	Goldthwaite			
St. Peters Catholic Church	Catholic	Goldthwaite			
Jones Valley Baptist Church	Baptish	Jones Valley			
Mount Olive Baptist Church	Baptist		July 28, 1899		
Mullin Church of Christ	Church of Christ	Mulliin			
First Baptist Church	Baptist	Mullin			
First United Methodist Church	Methodist	Mullin			
Pompey Mountain Congregational Methodist Church	Methodist	Pompey Mountain			
Pompey Mountain Missionary Baptist Church	Baptist	Pompey Mountain			
Priddy Baptist Church	Baptist	Priddy			
Zion Lutheran Church	Lutheran	Priddy			
Regency Primitive Baptist Church	Baptist	Regency			
Church of Christ	Church of Christ	Star			
Star Baptist Church	Baptist	Star			
Star United Methodist Church	Methodist	Star			
Trigger Mountain Church	Baptist	Trigger Mountain			

== Economy ==
Economic Data for Mills County
2020 Gross Domestic Product (GDP)	$201.8 M
Commodity Totals - Sales, Measured in $	$30,899,000
Crop Totals - Sales, Measured in $	$2,439,000
Animal Totals, Incl Products - Sales, Measured in $	$28,459,000
2021 Unemployment Rate	4.4%

Mills County Real Gross Domestic Product, 2018-2021
2018	2019	2020	2021	2021 state rank	2019 % change	2020 % change	2021 % change	2021 % state rank
$174,264,000	$190,467,000	$196,656,000	$191,994,000	228	9.3%	3.2%	-2.4%	176

The county has historically sustained its economy with farming and ranching operations of varying sizes, with small businesses and recreational hunting providing additional income. By 1890, agriculture had established an economic base in the county. Agritourism, including recreational hunting and fishing, continues to supplement the economy. The county's deer population started growing after screwworm eradication programs were developed.

Mineral resources in the county are minimal: a small vein of coal was discovered near Ebony around 1950, and Weston No. 1 Well, located in the Rock Springs Community, produced very little gas and oil. Much later, in 1982, oil made another appearance, yielding 28,122 barrels, yet by 1990, oil production ceased.

=== Farming and ranching ===
==== Statistics ====
2017 Agricultural Value
Commodity	2017 Estimated Dollars
Beef	19,187,200
Milk	6,000,000
Sheep	5,859,600
Hay	5,000,000
Hunting	4,925,000
Goats	2,874,000

Records show that the county has featured a large population of sheep and goats. Sheep reached a peak of 133,737 head in 1940, and goats reached a peak of 118,009 in 1964. Cattle fluctuated from a low of 16,279 head in 1940 to a high of 48,901 in 1978. Total animal units in the county was 41,745 in 1935 before reaching a peak of 69,429 AU in 1969. The 2012 agricultural census reported 34,294 sheep, 23,325 goats, and 32,663 head of cattle, with 42,568 AU. Average ranch size was 109 hectares in 1935 before reaching a peak size of 256 hectares in 1969. The 2012 agricultural census reported a decrease to an average size of 219 hectares.

By 1890, there were 680 farms and ranches in the county, consisting of 142,299 acres, with 25,000 head of cattle and 23,000 sheep.

By 1930, the county produced 32,000 acres of cotton, 21,300 head of cattle, 68,000 goats (many raised for mohair), 78,000 sheep, and 67,000 chickens.

In 1979, Mills County ranked among the top ten Texas counties in the mohair industry: eighth in number of Angora goats (38,000 head) and seventh in pounds of mohair produced (386,000 pounds). Total county income in 1979 from both mohair and wool reached more than $65.9 million.

==== General history ====
Farming and ranching in the county have historically had about equal importance, and most agricultural operations had both. The natural resources of pre-Mills county in Brown, Comanche, Hamilton, and Lampasas counties offered good support for early farming and ranching, yet most of the early settlers made their living by hunting. Game provided food and pelts were often sent to Houston to sell. By the early 1890s, large game such as bear, panther, and jaguar had been evacuated from the county, leaving hunters smaller game such as bobcat, fox, wolf, coon, and possums. Game was the only substantive food for early settlers; deer, however, served various needs: in many households, they were the main meat and they sold antler and skins. Hogs were once raised county-wide for meat.

One report from 1957 identifies that only nineteen percent of the land can be tilled, placing an emphasis on grazing land.

The cattle industry traces it beginnings to the first herd of long-horn cattle that arrived in Mills County in 1865, brought by J.H. Flower, which was followed shortly after by a huge herd purchased by John Williams. The yearling sale at Williams Ranch attracted buyers from Kansas or the Indian Territory. Cattle roamed the open range before settlers started fencing their land in the mid-1860s. Barbed wire arrived in 1875 and by 1879 was widely available in Texas. Land owners often fenced in areas they did not own that sometimes included public water sources for livestock, which led to a fence-cutting epidemic in the mid-1880s, leading to legislation forbidding it. A severe drought in 1886 and 1887 led to cattle and horse deaths; whole herds of cattle left the country looking for water, and their owners sometime spent days hunting for them. Some ranchers drove the herds to other parts of Texas to find water.

The cattle industry, from the beginning, has exhibited wild swings in prices in response to many factors, yet it remains a mainstay industry in Mills County. Early cattle trade in Mills County relied on the Fort Worth Stockyards for selling, but the local auction ring effected higher prices through bidding, rather than waiting to receive an offer from a buyer who came to visit a rancher's stock. Robert Briley started the first local auction that changed hands many times to become the Mills County Livestock Commission of Goldthwaite. Later to be called the Mills County Commission Company, it was the largest sheep and goat sale in the world for a period. One day in June 1956, Malcolm Jernigan auctioned over 15,000 sheep in a single day. An industry related to livestock buying and selling was the trucking business, which started before local auctions. Early trucking, which only required a license and a railroad permit, was pioneered by Everett Holland and Lindsay Kettle from Mullin and Slim Hurst from Star.

Most of the early pioneers brought sheep when they arrived. Owners clipped wool by hand and sent the fiber by wagon train to be sold in Houston. The first local to have a sizable sheep herd was Eli Fairman, known as "Sheepman" Fairman. In May 1892, more than 200,000 pounds of wool shorn from Mills County sheep sold for eighteen cents a pound to a buyer in Boston and shipped by train from Goldthwaite. The first reported rail movement of mohair occurred on April 11, 1903, when a shipment of hair produced on the Elberta Ranch, located on South Bennett Creek, was sent to a processing mill in Lowell, Massachusetts. By 1910, there were 4,239 head of Angora goats in the county. Blackwell Wool and Mohair served as the main agent for warehousing and selling the fibers for most of the twentieth century. Sheep and goats are credited with improving the economy of Mills County more than cattle, largely due to stable prices and the county having optimal conditions for raising them. For years, Mills County ranked second in the state for wool and mohair production. In 1944, Texas Railroad Commissioner Ernest O. Thompson announced that Texas lead all states in wool and mohair production. The mohair industry started declining around 1970 with the introduction of polyester. In 1976, Mills County also ranked highest in the state for lamb feeding operations. More recently, meat goat production has eclipsed wool and mohair. Predator control continues to a challenge for sheep and goat populations in the county.

The first farmers in pre-Mills county used three basic tools: a walking turning plow, a walking planter, and a walking cultivator; these tools eventually gave way to mechanized implements.

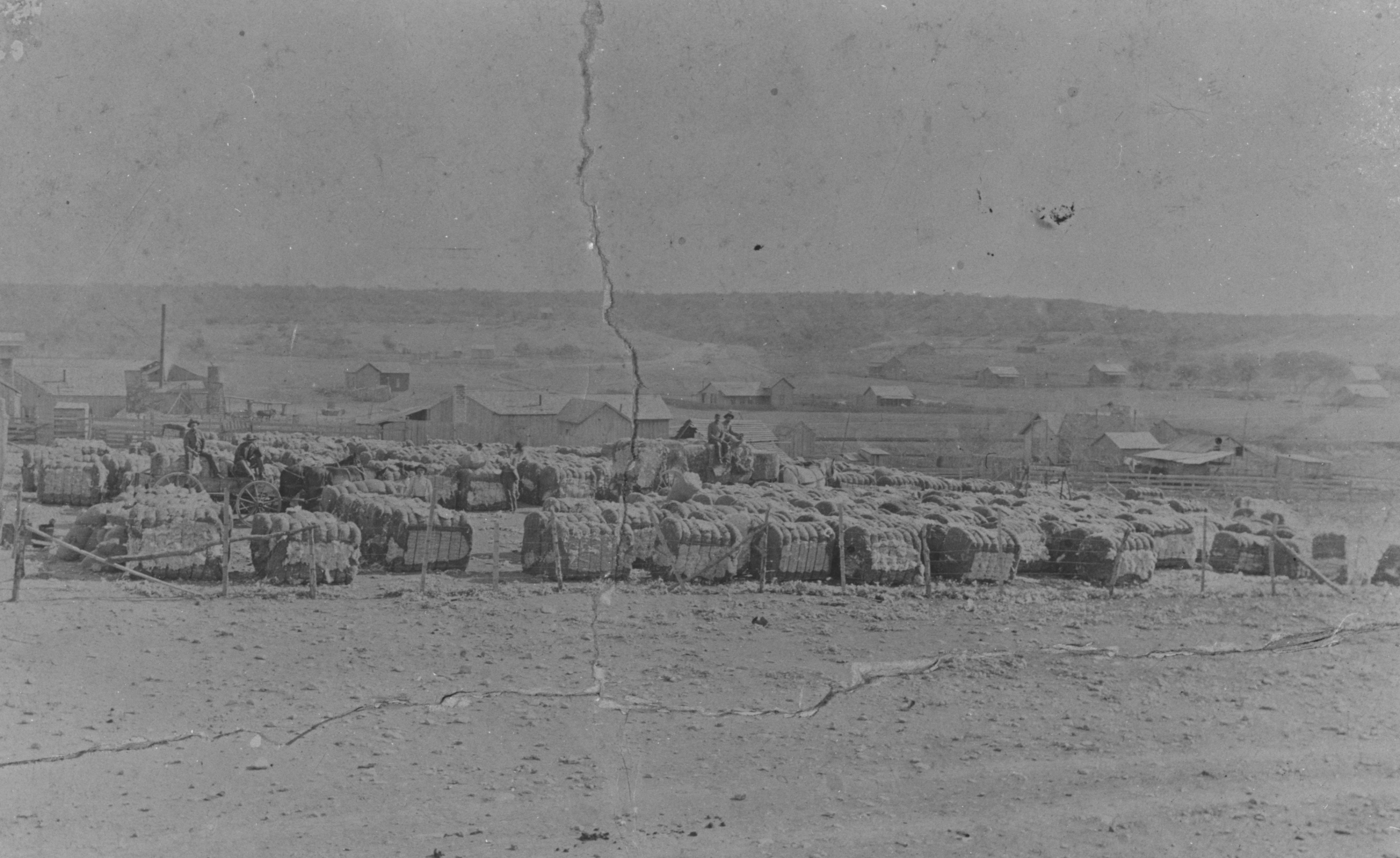
Cotton bales and cotton processing facility in Goldthwaite, ca. 1900

By 1864, settlers started growing and harvesting cotton—the first bale of cotton was picked by W.F. Brown and ginned in Comanche. By 1910, cotton acreage had ballooned to 46,000; it was the main crop from 1887 through 1917. In 1899, The Goldthwaite Eagle published that "some of the farmers [in Pleasant Grove] have plowed up their wheat and planted cotton, calculating on 4 cents per pound ... we fear as long as cotton is the principle crop at the above prices our country will remain in an embarrassed condition financially." As the land was turned over to cotton, the cattle business shifted into western Texas. Families worked together during cotton picking time to collect bales that would be taken to town to sell. World War I disrupted the economy, leading to a decline in cotton production. The war also underscored the importance of crop diversification in Mills County. By 1930, there were 32,000 acres of county land planted in cotton. Cotton acreage reached a low of 2,078 in 1959, exacerbated by the boll weevil.

In 1912, the Santa Fe Railroad published a pamphlet, Practical Information for the Farmers of Central West Texas, which provided crop and livestock recommendations that the company claimed would thrive in the county. The publication also espoused the importance of agricultural diversification.

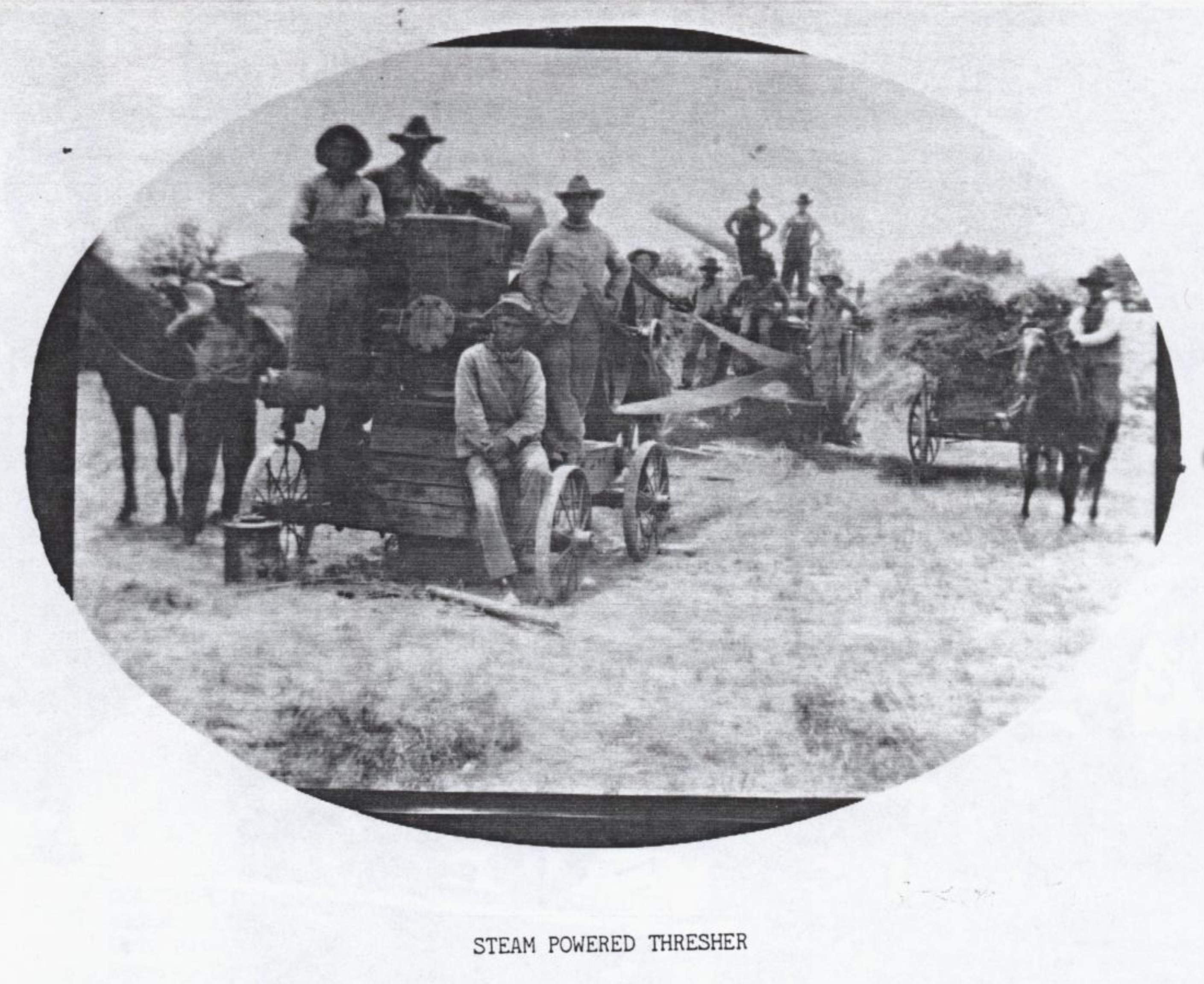
Steam-powered thresher, Mills County, date unknown

By around 1912, most families owned a small amount of stock and farmed small grain as a necessity. At about the same time, steam threshers hit the market in Mills County. Before then, farmers relied on horse-powered threshers. Threshing, which typically started in June and ran for about four weeks, was typically part of a community effort that included neighbors who hauled the grain to the barn and women that helped cook meals. A crew consisted of an engine man, fireman, separator man, sack holders, pitchers, and grain and water wagon drivers. Steam threshing crews could be "dependent" or "independent," which classified whether the wife of the crop's owner supplied meals. Most of the later crews were "independent," which meant they had their own cook shack. During this time, around ten threshing crews worked the summer months in Mills County. D.O. Simpson ran a threshing operation continuously from 1912 to 1938. His first machine was a J.I. Case rig that had a steam tractor and a separator. Bud Harper managed a threshing crew near Star. Combines appeared suddenly in Mills County, pushing out not only threshing machines but also reapers by 1939. The Goldthwaite Eagle published the first image of a tractor in the summer of 1915, a Case Model 10–20. In the mid twentieth century, J.D. Harper was the most robust farm implement dealer in Goldthwaite and used a railroad car for shipping into the 1970s.

The 1920s brought prosperity to Mills County, yet booming oil business opportunities outside of Mills County caused many citizens to move for better pay. The Great Depression devastated the county, just as it did the rest of the country. It brought a general decline in Mills County farming (and overall population) and effected further agricultural diversification, leading not only to an upswing in sheep, goat, and chicken production but also to developing additional sources such as pecans, fruit, and dairy. In 1925, J.L. Corts established the first dairy about three miles southwest Goldthwaite called the "Regular Dairy Farm". The first Mills County cheese factory opened in Goldthwaite in 1928. Also around this time, cold storage developed as both a stand-alone industry and also became a means to enhance other industries such as poultry. Turkey and egg production were once leading businesses in the county. Homer McCasland once had about 30,000 layers producing eggs that were distributed through a Dallas facility. But before large-scale poultry farms, local farmers sold their birds to distributors who shipped to markets in the east. In an advertisement appearing in May 1907, B.F. Geeslin offered poultry farmers a chance to sell their birds to him for 7.5 cents per pound; in turn, he would ship them to eastern buyers via rail.

Depression relief programs provided by the U.S. Government were headquartered in the courthouse with E.B. Gilliam as administrator, yet Mills County's needs were not as severe as other counties in Central Texas. One form of recovery that helped Mills County was the Agriculture Adjustment Act.

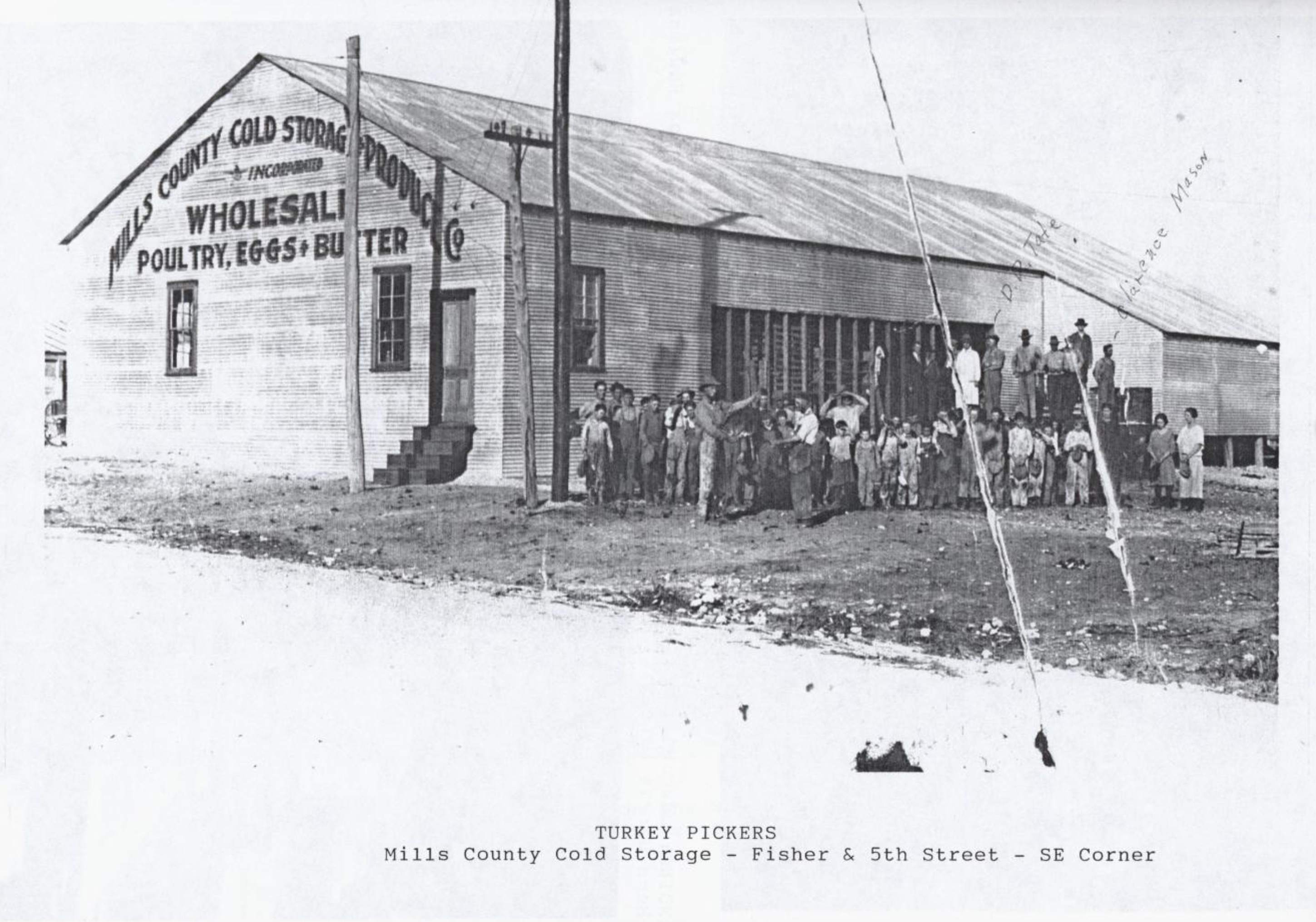
Turkey pickers, Mills County Cold Storage, date unknown

By 1940, productive cropland dropped from 89,343 acres reported in 1930 to 78,372 acres as more land was used for mohair goats and sheep. The total number of farms dropped nine percent to 1,364.

The Soil Bank Program under the Eisenhower administration in the 1950s paid farmers to transform under-producing farmland to pastureland, and most of the land never returned to production. By 1959, cropland dropped to 32,000 acres, and the total number of farms dropped to 767, with a concomitant drop in population.

Starting in the 1970s and early 1980s, the county gained a number of manufacturing companies. By 1982, there were eight manufacturers employing one-hundred people, which brought a slight population increase.

Mills County is a leader in Texas pecan production. Pecans are credited as one of the most lucrative crops in the early days of Mills County, fetching about four cents per pound. In the early days, pecan crops were typically sold at markets in Houston. In 1905, one Mills County citizen reported earnings of $49.10 from a single tree. By 1929, pecan production had developed into a solid industry mostly in the southern part of the county, which became a recognized center for development of new varieties. 174,637 bushels of improved pecans were harvested in 1950, and in 1954 statistics reported 58,092 pecan trees and 385,792 pounds of pecans. Pecan harvesting as a business was accelerated by mechanization in the late 1950s, led by the invention of the pole or boom shaker by O.L. Sides and his sons, W.L. and C.N. Sides, under the auspices of their company, Metal Masters Machine, Inc. In 1958, the Sides brothers, working with Ted Burnham, developed the first drum pecan harvester, later known as the Lockwood Harvester, which used rubber picking fingers that were derived from a similar mechanism used to remove feathers from butchered poultry In 1965, the Sides contracted with Lockwood, a company that primarily worked with peanuts, to manufacture the machines. With over 800 acres of trees in the county, DeWayne McCasland has become a nationwide expert on pecans. McCasland helped organize the Texas Pecan Growers Association, a pecan marketing cooperative that originally served Texas and Oklahoma growers.

Truck farming also had its day in Mills County: one successful operation was Riverside Farm, owned by J.J. Cockrell near the Colorado River, which once had one hundred acres cultivated in a variety of fruits and a one-hundred tree pecan orchard.

Before the COVID pandemic, land in the county was selling for around $2,000 an acre and since has increased to about double that value, or more.

=== Renewable energy ===
There are currently four wind energy projects operating in Mills County that feature a total of 277 turbines and generate an estimated 846 MW of power.

- Castle Gap Wind Power LLC [partially in Lampasas County]
- Flat Top Wind I LLC
- Goldthwaite Wind Energy LLC
- Priddy Wind Project LLC

== Government ==
Mills County's governing body is a commissioner's court operating under Dillon's Rule, consisting of a county judge and four commissioners.

Mills County judges
Name	Date Elected	
Head, J. Bo	August 30, 1887	
Grundy, J.P.	November 6, 1888	
Head, J.B.	November 4, 1890	
Mohler, J.A.	November 8, 1892	
Clements, P.H.		July 1894-November 1894
Logan, A.V.	November 6, 1894	
Logan, A.V.	November 3, 1896	
Dalton, G.H.	November 8, 1898	
Dalton, G.H.	November 6, 1900	
Patterson, L.E.	November 4, 1902	
Patterson, L.E.	November 8, 1904	
Patterson, L.E.	November 6, 1906	
Patterson, L.E.	November 3, 1908	
Allen, S.H.	November 8, 1910	
Allen, S.H.	November 5, 1912	
Dalton, G.H.	November 3, 1914	
Weaver, A.B.	November 7, 1916	
Weaver, Robert	November 5, 1918	
Patterson, L.E.	November 2, 1920	
Patterson, L.E.	November 7, 1922	
Patterson, L.E.	November 4, 1924	
Patterson, L.E.	November 2, 1926	
Patterson, L.E.	November 6, 1928	
Simpson, Roy	November 4, 1930	
Patterson, L.E.	November 8, 1932	
Gerald, R.J.	November 8, 1938	
Gerald, R.J.	November 5, 1940	
Patterson, John	November 3, 1942	
Patterson, John L.	November 7, 1944	
Patterson, John L.	November 5, 1946	
Porter, L.B.	November 2, 1948	
Porter, L.B.	November 7, 1950	
Patterson, John L.	November 4, 1952	
Patterson, John L.	November 2, 1954	
Yarborough, W.G.	November 4, 1958	
Egger, Cecil	November 14, 1960	
Egger, Cecil	November 6, 1962	
Egger, Cecil	November 8, 1966	
Egger, Cecil	November 3, 1970	
Faulkner, H.S.	November 5, 1974	
Ledbetter, J.W.	November 7, 1978	Ledbetter was appointed judge in November 1977 following the resignation of Herbert Faulkner; Ledbetter was officially elected in 1978. He then resigned on July 28, 1980 (effective August 1, 1980) and was replaced by L.B. Bynum.
Johnson, Wallace	November 4, 1980	Wallace elected to fill unexpired term of Jamie Ledbetter
Johnson, Wallace	November 2, 1982	
Johnson, Wallace	November 4, 1986	
Johnson, Wallace	November 6, 1990	
Wright, Randy	November 8, 1994	
Fulk, Kirkland	November 2008	General Election 2008
Fulk, Kirkland	November 2010	General Election 2010
Fulk, Kirkland	November 2014	General Election 2014
Smith, Ed	May 22, 2018	Runoff election
Johnson, Jett	November 8, 2022	Johnson won the May 24, 2022, Republican primary election and was sworn in as judge on August 26, 2022, a week after Judge Ed Smith resigned; Johnson was unopposed at the November 8, 2022 general election.

Mills County commissioners
Name	Precinct	Date Elected	Notes
Moore, S.M.	4	August 30, 1887	
Kelly, D.H.	3	August 30, 1887	
Dalton, G.H.	1	August 30, 1887	
Roach, Matt	1	November 6, 1888	
Patterson, A.V.	2	November 6, 1888	
Dalton, G.H.	3	November 6, 1888	
Cooke, S.L.	4	November 6, 1888	
Clements, Phil W.	1	November 4, 1890	
Patterson, A.V.	2	November 4, 1890	
Dalton, G.H.	3	November 4, 1890	
Cooke, S.L.	4	November 4, 1890	
Ashley, D.C.	1	November 8, 1892	
Fletcher, W.H.	2	November 8, 1892	
Belew, W.M.	3	November 8, 1982	
Cooke, S.L.	4	November 8, 1892	
Whitaker, Geo.	1	November 6, 1894	
Fletcher, W.H.	2	November 6, 1894	
Dalton, G.H.	3	November 6, 1894	
Harvey, L.F.	4	November 6, 1894	
Curry, P.E.	1	November 3, 1896	
Head, J.B.	2	November 3, 1896	
Sharp, R.B.	3	November 3, 1896	
Harvey, L.F.	4	November 3, 1896	
Roach, Matt	1	November 8, 1898	
Head, J.B.	2	November 8, 1898	
Boles, J.	3	November 8, 1898	
Mason, W.J.	4	November 8, 1898	
Humphries, M.C.	1	November 6, 1900	
Patterson, A.V.	2	November 6, 1900	
Fisher, J.L.	3	November 6, 1900	
Nelson, Walter	4	November 6, 1900	
Humphries, M.C.	1	November 4, 1902	
Jones, J.F.	2	November 4, 1902	
Henry, Hugh	3	November 4, 1902	
Cooke, S.L.	4	November 4, 1902	
Humphries, M.C.	1	November 8, 1904	
Jones, J.F.	2	November 8, 1904	
Henry, Hugh	3	November 8, 1904	
Cook, S.L.	4	November 8, 1904	
Humphries, M.C.	1	November 6, 1906	
Jones, J.F.	2	November 6, 1906	
Fletcher, J.A.	3	November 6, 1906	
Cooke, S.L.	4	November 6, 1906	
Berry, J.D.	1	November 3, 1908	
Mason, J.W.	2	November 3, 1908	
Renfro, J.B.	3	November 3, 1908	
Nelson, W.H.	4	November 3, 1908	
Hines, M.H.	1	November 8, 1910	
Mason, J.W.	2	November 8, 1910	
Renfro, J.B.	3	November 8, 1910	
Nelson, W.H.	4	November 8, 1910	
Hines, M.H.	1	November 5, 1912	
Carter J.R.	2	November 5, 1912	
Swindle, R.F.	3	November 5, 1912	
Haynes, Reide M.	4	November 5, 1912	
Karnes, A.D.	1	November 7, 1916	
Henderson, J.F.	2	November 7, 1916	
Hamilton, D.A.	3	November 7, 1916	
Griffin, E.J.	4	November 7, 1916	
Burnham, L.B.	1	November 2, 1920	
Head, C.A.	2	November 2, 1920	
Johnson, W.C.	3	November 2, 1920	
Bledsoe, J.T.	4	November 2, 1920	
Burnham, L.B.	1	November 7, 1922	
Head, C.A.	2	November 7, 1922	
Renfro, J.B.	3	November 7, 1922	
Lowe, Jesse	4	November 7, 1922	
Burnham, L.B.	1	November 4, 1924	
Biddle, W.M.	2	November 4, 1924	
Johnson, W.C.	3	November 4, 1924	
Lowe, Jesse	4	November 4, 1924	
Burnham, L.B.	1	November 2, 1926	
Biddle, W.M.	2	November 2, 1926	
Renfro, J.B.	3	November 2, 1926	
Lowe, Jesse	4	November 2, 1926	
Burnham, L.B.	1	November 4, 1930	
Biddle, W.M.	2	November 4, 1930	
Duren, E.A.	3	November 4, 1930	
Burnett, J.H.	4	November 4, 1930	
Burnham, L.B.	1	November 8, 1932	
Hamilton, J.A.	2	November 8, 1932	
McCurry, T.	3	November 8, 1932	
Burnett, J.H.	4	November 8, 1932	
Burnham, L.B.	1	November 6, 1934	
Hamilton, J.A.	2	November 6, 1934	
McCurry, T.	3	November 6, 1934	
Egger, J.G.	4	November 6, 1934	
Shaw, O.H.	1	November 8, 1938	
Hamilton, J.A.	2	November 8, 1938	
Barker, W.L.	3	November 8, 1938	
Egger, J.G.	4	November 8, 1938	
Tullos, J.Y.	1	November 3, 1942	
Hamilton, J.A.	2	November 3, 1942	
McCurry, T.	3	November 3, 1942	
Roberts, S.A.	4	November 3, 1942	
Tullos, J.Y.	1	November 7, 1944	
Hamilton, J.A.	2	November 7, 1944	
Henry, K.B.	3	November 7, 1944	
Davis, J.F.	4	November 7, 1944	
Tullos, J.Y.	1	November 5, 1946	
Wall, Fred V.	2	November 5, 1946	
	3	November 5, 1946	
	4	November 5, 1946	
Tullos, J.Y.	1	November 2, 1948	
Wall, Fred V.	2	November 2, 1948	
Henry, K.B.	3	November 2, 1948	
Davis, J.F.	4	November 2, 1948	
Tullos, J.Y.	1	November 7, 1950	
Wall, Fred V.	2	November 7, 1950	
Henry, K.B.	3	November 7, 1950	
Davis, J.F.	4	November 7, 1950	
Tullos, J.Y.	1	November 4, 1952	
Wall, Fred V.	2	November 4, 1952	
Downey, Albert	3	November 4, 1952	
Egger, Cecil	4	November 4, 1952	
Shaw, O.H.	1	November 2, 1954	
Wall, Fred V.	2	November 5, 1954	
Lee, W.T.	3	November 2, 1954	
Egger, Cecil	4	November 2, 1954	
Shaw, O.H.	1	November 6, 1956	
Shaw, Kenneth H.	1	November 9, 1959	
Lee, W.T. (Son)	3	November 6, 1956	
Wall Fred V.	2	November 4, 1958	
Brooks, H.G.	4	November 4, 1958	
Rudd, Guy	1	November 8, 1960	
Wall, Fred V.	2	November 6, 1962	
Lindsey, W.R.	3	November 8, 1960	
Brooks, H.G.	4	November 6, 1962	
Rudd, Guy	1	November 2, 1964	
Lindsey, W.R.	3	November 2, 1964	
Rowlett, A.R.	4		Unexpired term
Wall, Fred V.	2	November 8, 1966	
Rowlett, A.R.	4	November 8, 1966	
Roberts, Burthal	1	November 5, 1968	
Lindsey, Ray	3	November 5, 1968	
Wall, Fred V.	2	November 3, 1970	
Rowlett, A.R.	4	November 3, 1970	
Roberts, Burthal	1	November 7, 1972	
Lindsey, Ray	3	November 7, 1972	
Watson, Lewis D.	2	November 5, 1974	
Jernigan, Hawley	4	November 5, 1974	
Roberts, Burthal	1	November 2, 1976	
Crawford, W.G.	3	November 2, 1976	
Watson, Lewis D.	2	November 7, 1978	
Jernigan, Hawley	4	November 7, 1978	
Daniel, Floyd	1	November 4, 1980	
Crawford, William	3	November 4, 1980	
Watson, Lewis	2	November 2, 1982	
Jernigan, H.B.	4	November 2, 1984	
Lindsay, Marvin	1	November 6, 1984	
Schwartz, Lee Roy	3	November 6, 1984	
Watson, Lewis	2		
Thorne, Farrel	4	November 4, 1986	
Lindsay, Marvin	1	November 8, 1988	
Schwartz, Lee Roy	3	November 8, 1988	
Parker, Bill	2	November 6, 1990	
Griffin, Charles H.	4	November 6, 1990	
Karnes, Joe	1	November 3, 1992	
Schwartz, Lee Roy	3	November 3, 1992	
Bunting, Carroll	2	November 8, 1994	
Griffin, Charles H.	4	March 8, 1994	Mrs. C.H. Griffin was appointed to her husband's unexpired term following his death
Henry, Dale	3	November 5, 1996	
Karnes, Joe	1	November 5, 1996	
Crawford, W.G.	3	November 4, 2008	
Harper, K.	2	November 2, 2010	
Hall, R.	3	November 6, 2012	
Wright, M.	1	November 6, 2012	
Garren, Jed	2	November 6, 2018	
Wright, Mike	1	November 6, 2020	
Partin, Dale	3	November 6, 2020	
Head, Robert	2	November 8, 2022	
Williams, Jason	4	November 8, 2022	

Mills County attorneys
Name	Date Elected
Burns, Uvalde	August 30, 1887
Whitaker, Geo.	November 6, 1888
Cervles, J.R.	November 4, 1890
Unknown	November 8, 1892
Anderson, E.B.	November 6, 1884
Anderson, E.B.	November 3, 1896
Patterson, Lon	November 8, 1898
Patterson, L.E.	November 6, 1900
Pribble, A.T.	November 4, 1902
Pribble, A.T.	November 8, 1904
Pribble, A.T.	November 6, 1906
Pribble, A.T.	November 3, 1908
Woods, W.H.	November 8, 1910
Unknown	November 5, 1912
Bowman, F.P.	November 3, 1914
Bowman, F.P.	November 7, 1916
Pribble, A.T.	November 5, 1918
Pridbble, A.T.	November 2, 1920
Pribble, A.T.	November 7, 1922
Bowman, F.P.	November 4, 1924
Pribble, A.T.	November 2, 1926
Pribble, A.T.	November 6, 1928
Pribble, A.T.	November 4, 1930
Pribble, A.T.	November 8, 1932
Pribble, A.M.	November 8, 1938
Pribble, A.M.	November 5, 1940
Pribble, Maston	November 3, 1942
Pribble, A.T.	November 7, 1946
Yarborough, W.G.	November 5, 1946
Pribble, A.M.	November 2, 1948
Pribble, A.M.	November 7, 1950
Pribble, A.M.	November 2, 1954
Pribble, A.M.	November 4, 1958
Yarborough, W.G.	November 6, 1962
Pribble, A.M.	November 2, 1964
Pribble, A.M.	November 5, 1968
Pribble, A.M.	November 7, 1972
Pribble, A.M.	November 2, 1976
Cockrum, J.C.	November 4, 1980
Cockrum, J.C.	November 8, 1988
Adams, Tommy	November 3, 1992
Roberts, Keri	November 2008
Hale, Gerald	November 2016
Hale, Gerald	November 6, 2020

Mills County justices of the peace
Name	Date Elected	Notes
Knight, L.R.	November 2, 2010	

Mills County sheriffs
Name	Date Elected	Notes
Cunningham, George W.	August 30, 1887	
Cunningham, G.W.	November 6, 1888	
Cunningham, G.W.	November 4, 1890	
Geeslin, B.L.	November 8, 1892	
Geeslin, B.J. Jr.	November 6, 1894	
Geeslin, B.F.	November 3, 1896	
Welch, W.G.	November 8, 1898	
Welch, W.G.	November 6, 1900	
Atkinson, R.J.	November 4, 1902	
Atkinson, R.J.	November 8, 1904	
Ezzell, H.C.	November 6, 1906	
Ezzell, H.C.	November 3, 1908	
Priddy, E.O.	November 8, 1910	
Priddy, E.O.	November 5, 1912	
Burnett, John H.	November 3, 1914	
Burnett, J.H.	November 7, 1916	
Evans, J. Everett	November 5, 1918	
Evans, J. Everett	November 2, 1920	
Karnes, A.D.	November 7, 1922	
Karnes, A.D.	November 4, 1924	
Bledsoe, Carl D.	November 2, 1926	
Bledsoe, Carl D.	November 6, 1928	
Bledsoe, Carl D.	November 4, 1930	
Bledsoe, Carl D.	November 8, 1932	
Harris, J.H.	November 6, 1934	
Harris, J.H.	November 8, 1938	
Harris, J.H.	November 5, 1940	
Harris, J.H.	November 3, 1942	
Reynolds, F.D.	November 7, 1944	
Mahan, W.L.	November 5, 1946	
Mahan, W.L.	November 2, 1948	
Stubblefield, C.F.	November 7, 1950	
Stubblefield, C.F.	November 6, 1956	
Stubblefield, C.F.	November 8, 1960	
Brooks, Horace	November 2, 1964	
Brooks, Horace G.	November 5, 1968	
Brooks, Horace	November 7, 1972	
Brooks, Horace	November 2, 1976	
Wetterman, Ron	November 4, 1980	
Casbeer, Mack	November 6, 1984	
Carr, Glenn	November 8, 1988	
Carr, Glenn	November 3, 1992	
Odom, Darwin	December 10, 1996	The general election held on November 5, 1996 resulted in a tie between Glenn Carr and Darwin Odom; a vote to break the tie was held on December 10, 1996 that declared Odom the winner.
Storey, Doug	December 2008	
Hammonds, Clint	November 6, 2020	

== Education ==
School districts covering parts of the county include:

- Brookesmith Independent School District
- Comanche Independent School District
- Goldthwaite Consolidated Independent School District
- Hamilton Independent School District
- Lometa Independent School District
- Mullin Independent School District
- Priddy Independent School District
- Zephyr Independent School District

Former school districts:

- Star Independent School District - Merged into Goldthwaite ISD on July 1, 2014.

All of Mills County is in the Central Texas College District.

=== History of education ===
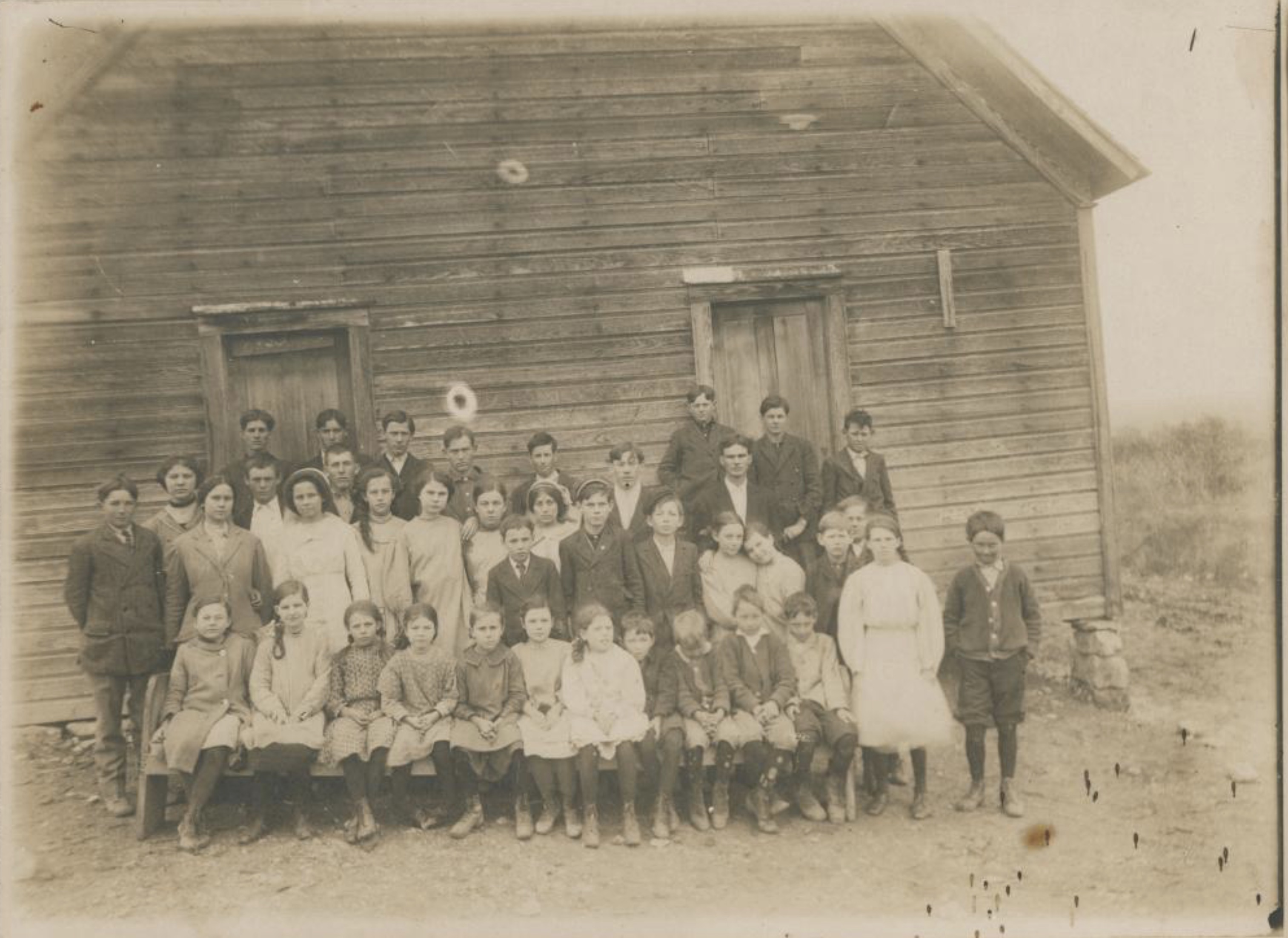
South Bennett School students, c. 1911

Early settlers taught their children the rudiments of reading, writing, and arithmetic at home when time allowed and within the limited boundaries of what they knew. The first schools were held in the summertime under brush arbors, and teachers' meager pay was supplemented by gifts of provisions and free rent. Attendance was poor due to the long distances that students had to travel. Taught self-reliance and independence at home, lots of students defied the direction of teachers. One of the early school teachers before Mills County was Phil H. Clements, who was teaching in 1878 after moving to Williams Ranch. The concept of grades did not exist in the early days: students were classified according to reading level, e.g. second reader. Often older, advanced students were called upon to teacher their juniors.

School buildings started appearing in the 1860s and early 1870s, which were constructed by local men of logs with dirt floors, appointed with split-log benches and fireplaces, which a few years later were replaced by wood stoves. Eventually log schools evolved into lumber-based buildings as material became available. Schools usually had one room that had partitions made of panels or curtains for classrooms. Books were donated by parents. Most early schools had a tower with a bell, which rang out to announce the start of the school day. Most also had a stage with a curtain made of advertising squares promoting local merchants, along with artistic embellishments, which was a source of community pride. State support of pre-Mills County schools was minimal in the early days: for instance, Williams Ranch received ninety-nine dollars in 1878. Students brought simple lunches in lard buckets, usually consisting of leftover bisquits. In the early days, only Goldthwaite, Mullin, Priddy, and Star offered high school diplomas.

An important order of business at the first meeting of the Mills County Commissioner's Court on October 12, 1887, was to incorporate schools that existed at the time into the a new county educational system, including establishing local school taxes.

Schools migrated to Mills County by court order in 1887
Brown County	Hamilton County	Lampasas County
"Union District at Goldthwaite"	District No. 35: Long Branch	District No. 40: Big Valley
William Ranch at Williams Ranch	District No. 46: Payne Gap	District No. 31: Big Valley
William Ranch at William Ranch (Black)	District No. 36: Center City	District No. 35: Kelley
Rock Springs at Rock Springs	District No. 39: Pleasant Grove	
Browns Creek on North Brown Creek	District No. 38 South Bennett	
Pompey Mountain near Pompey Mountain	District No. 37: North Bennett	
Ewing on Bayou		
Williams at Mouth of Blanket Creek		
Blanket Springs on Blanket Creek		
Pleasant Ridge west of Blanket Creek		
Cold Spring on Colorado River		
Jones Valley on Colorado River		
Hanna Valley on Colorado River		
Buffalo Creek on Colorado River		
Pompey Creek on Pompey Creek		

In 1900, Mr. and Mrs. T.W. Hatcher organized the Mills County Institute, also known as Hatcher University, in Goldthwaite on Fisher Street. It closed in 1907.

In 1907, the "Self Culture Club" opened the first community library in the M.L. Brown Drug Store. Miss Alline Howell, a teacher at the Rye Valley School, gathered community support to open the first county school library in 1915. Its first collection of books were purchased as a lot from Farm and Ranch Magazine.

By 1910, there were fifty-two public schools in Mills County with sixty-five teachers, and by 1976, there were eighty-one schools.

During the 1930s, with teachers desperate for jobs, school boards were able to make strenuous demands of teachers, often requiring them to live in the community where they taught, agree to leave the community only one weekend per month, participate in various community events, and sometimes agree to not marry.

The Star School building, erected in 1940, is the only school in the county to be built by the W.P.A.

Today Mills County has four consolidated schools: Goldthwaite, Mullin, and Priddy [source included Star, which consolidated with Goldthwaite Consolidated ISD on July 1, 2014].

== Recreation ==
The early county residents enjoyed a number of diversions, including dancing, attending movies, running horse races, going to town on Saturdays, and drinking at the saloons. The first Mills County fairgrounds, located on the south side of Goldthwaite to the east of Livestock Commission Company, had a number of features, including a race track, baseball and football fields, an exhibition building, a band and dance platform, and sometimes a skating rink. It also hosted a carnival. All Goldthwaite football games were held at the football field at the fairgrounds—without bleachers–until a stadium was built near the school in the late 1930s. The circus, hosted in Goldthwaite, also attracted residents from across the county. Another regular diversion for county residents were medicine shows, held in Goldthwaite, in which proprietors put on an entertaining show designed to sell nostrums. In the 1920s, Lake Merrit attracted many Mills County residents, who camped and swam there.

Goldthwaite is home to the Texas State Championship BBQ & Goat Cook-off, which was started in 1996.

An abundance of deer, dove, hogs, turkey, and small game attracts recreational hunters from Texas and beyond. Fishing is also a popular activity in the county.

The annual Mills County Youth Fair & Stock Show, a collaboration of FFA, FHA, and 4-H chapters from across the county, has been in operation for over 80 years. Mills County Extension Agent Tom Guthrie observed, "I think this is probably the largest single event in the county that brings kids and adults from all over Mills County together.

The Goldthwaite Theatre, established in 2017, occupies a historic property in downtown Goldthwaite that was once an opera house in the late nineteenth century. The building is owned by the city's Economic Development Corporation.

== Politics ==
United States presidential election results for Mills County, Texas
Year	Republican		Democratic		Third party(ies)	
Year	No.	%	No.	%	No.	%
1912	92	10.03%	573	62.49%	252	27.48%
1916	129	14.69%	640	72.89%	109	12.41%
1920	247	20.57%	669	55.70%	285	23.73%
1924	175	11.55%	1,289	85.08%	51	3.37%
1928	774	63.65%	442	36.35%	0	0.00%
1932	133	8.49%	1,434	91.51%	0	0.00%
1936	165	14.10%	1,005	85.90%	0	0.00%
1940	287	14.75%	1,658	85.20%	1	0.05%
1944	172	9.47%	1,428	78.59%	217	11.94%
1948	205	14.46%	1,135	80.04%	78	5.50%
1952	1,089	55.39%	875	44.51%	2	0.10%
1956	912	55.34%	735	44.60%	1	0.06%
1960	1,012	53.63%	869	46.05%	6	0.32%
1964	495	28.73%	1,228	71.27%	0	0.00%
1968	645	38.79%	722	43.42%	296	17.80%
1972	1,089	73.43%	388	26.16%	6	0.40%
1976	684	40.00%	1,012	59.18%	14	0.82%
1980	985	47.84%	1,028	49.93%	46	2.23%
1984	1,262	64.39%	688	35.10%	10	0.51%
1988	1,043	55.24%	842	44.60%	3	0.16%
1992	702	35.28%	753	37.84%	535	26.88%
1996	1,044	51.35%	748	36.79%	241	11.85%
2000	1,738	75.11%	548	23.68%	28	1.21%
2004	1,794	80.41%	416	18.65%	21	0.94%
2008	1,753	80.52%	398	18.28%	26	1.19%
2012	1,882	85.51%	279	12.68%	40	1.82%
2016	1,951	86.90%	243	10.82%	51	2.27%
2020	2,217	88.50%	271	10.82%	17	0.68%
2024	2,418	88.18%	310	11.31%	14	0.51%

United States Senate election results for Mills County, Texas1
Year	Republican		Democratic		Third party(ies)	
Year	No.	%	No.	%	No.	%
2024	2,343	85.82%	344	12.60%	43	1.58%

United States Senate election results for Mills County, Texas2
Year	Republican		Democratic		Third party(ies)	
Year	No.	%	No.	%	No.	%
2020	2,196	88.30%	252	10.13%	39	1.57%

Texas Gubernatorial election results for Mills County
Year	Republican		Democratic		Third party(ies)	
Year	No.	%	No.	%	No.	%
2022	1,894	89.30%	198	9.34%	29	1.37%

In a groundbreaking political study published in 1964, Mills County was identified as being entrenched in liberalism with voters overwhelmingly supporting Democratic politicians, owing to the county's southern heritage of liberal populism and single-party politics. In 2010, The Goldthwaite Eagle reported the county's dramatic shift to the Republican party following a long history of landslide Democratic voting in local elections.

Votes cast at the county's general election for November 8, 2022, showed a 90% Republican and 10% Democratic split.

=== Historical notes ===
The Populist Party was at its height in Mills County towards the end of the nineteenth century.

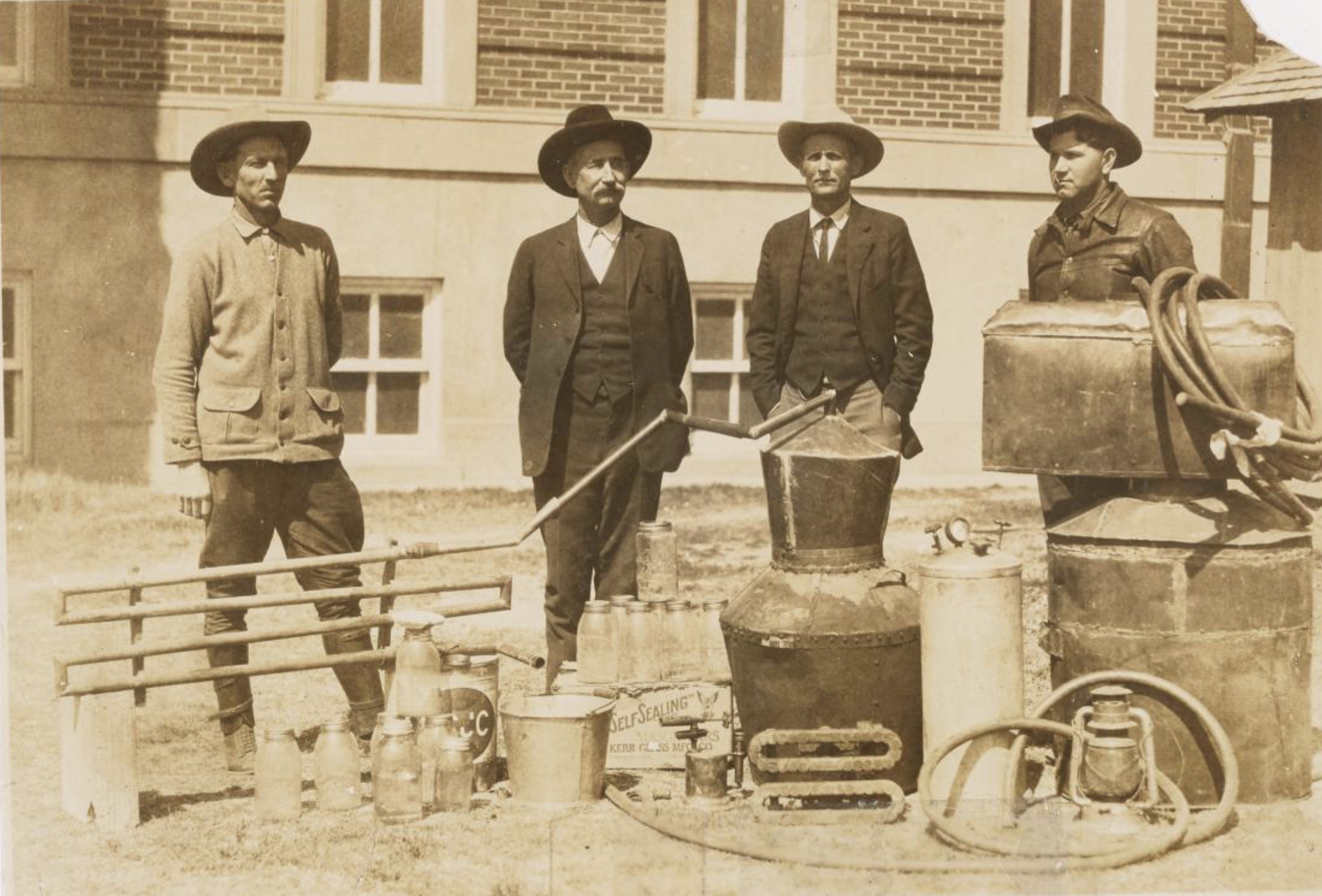
Officials with captured alcohol still, c. 1920-1929

A prohibition movement starting in the late nineteenth and early twentieth centuries lead to a ban on alcohol in the Goldthwaite School District; in 1908, liquor ban went into effect for the whole county. A local option election held on November 8, 2016, lifted the ban on alcohol sales within the Goldthwaite city limits (357 votes for and 277 against).

A special buffalo bar-b-que organized by a number of local businessman in 1948 welcomed Lyndon B. Johnson, who arrived by helicopter and delivered a speech to a crowd of 2,500 at the baseball field near Lampasas Commission Company.

== Media ==
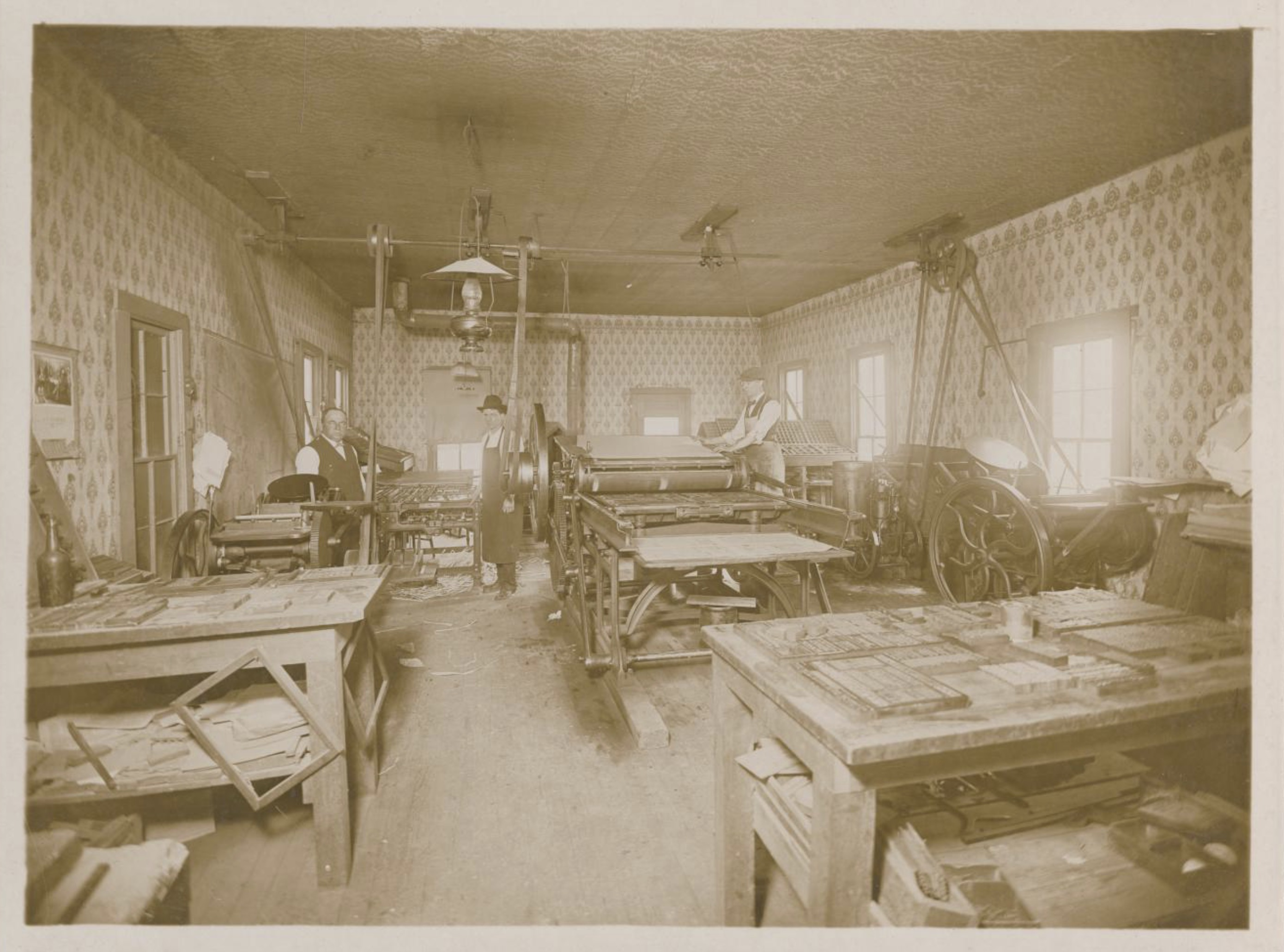
Goldthwaite Eagle printing office, c. 1910

The first known newspaper, preceding the formation of Mills County, was the Rancho Rackett, which started around 1880 at Williams Ranch. A broadside appeared in Goldthwaite, printed on a portable press by Lampasas resident "Calamity" Bonner, and is credited as the first paper distributed in the town. The Goldthwaite Mountaineer was published by W.H. Thompson starting on March 5, 1886, before ending publication in 1898 under Col. J.K. Street and merging with the Brownwood Record. Col. Street, after publishing The Goldthwaite Mountaineer for about three months, determined that the town could not sustain two newspapers. The first profitable weekly newspaper, The Mountain Eagle, was established by W.H. Thompson and R.M. Thompson in 1894. An early issue of the paper identifies itself as "the organ of Mills County." The same year a weekly called The Mills County Advocate commenced publication. In 1896, The Mountain Eagle was sold, and its name changed to The Goldthwaite Eagle. The Mullin Enterprise, which began in 1902, merged with The Eagle in 1950.

Mills County is part of the Waco/Temple/Killeen (Central Texas) DMA. Local media outlets include: KCEN-TV, KWTX-TV, KXXV-TV, KWKT-TV and KNCT-TV. Two other television stations from the Abilene/Sweetwater/Brownwood DMA provide coverage for Mills County, KTAB-TV and KRBC-TV. KRNR FM 92.7, "Redneck Radio," currently broadcasts from Goldthwaite. During the 1920s, a radio station owned by the Eagle Publishing Company, KGKB (frequency 1070 KC), broadcast from The Goldthwaite Eagle editorial offices before moving to Brownwood.

== Transportation ==
Pioneers traveled through pre-Mills County by wagon pulled by ox, mule, or horse teams on primitive clearings through wooded areas or via crude trails that were often nearly impassable in wet conditions due to mud holes. Rivers were forded, but some waterways had log bridges. They went to Waco or Houston for supplies—a round trip to Waco took seven to ten days. Freight wagons moved the same way loaded with hogs, wood, hides, pelts, and pecans to be traded for supplies, and they were sometimes followed by a herd of cattle.

Today the county maintains approximately 445 miles of county roads.

In 1901, before the Texas Highway Department was formed, county roads were maintained via a $3.00-per-person tax, known as the "road tax." Instead of paying the tax, a person could work three days a week on the road or hire someone else to take his place.

=== Railroad ===
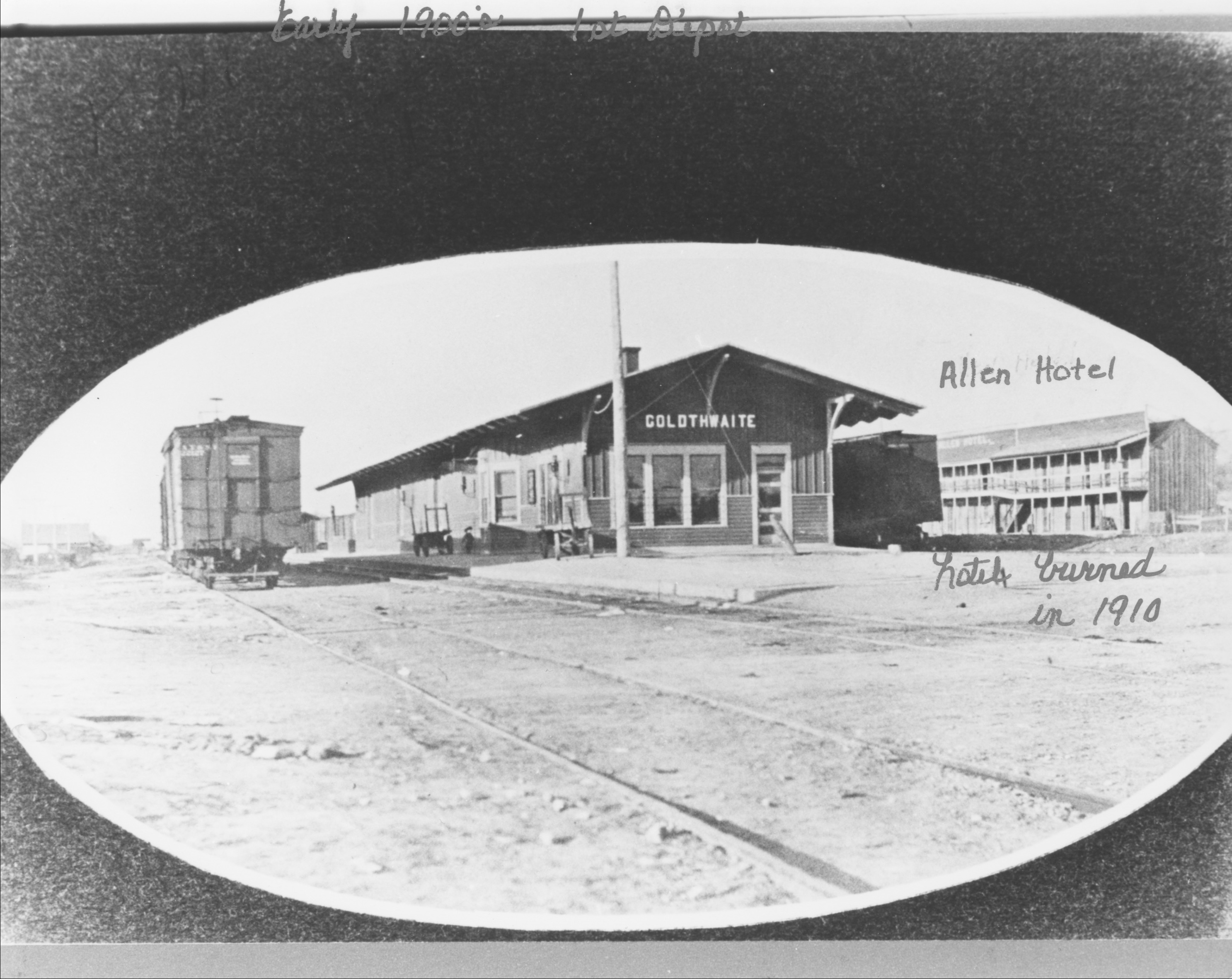
Second passenger depot in Goldthwaite, Texas, c. 1898-1911

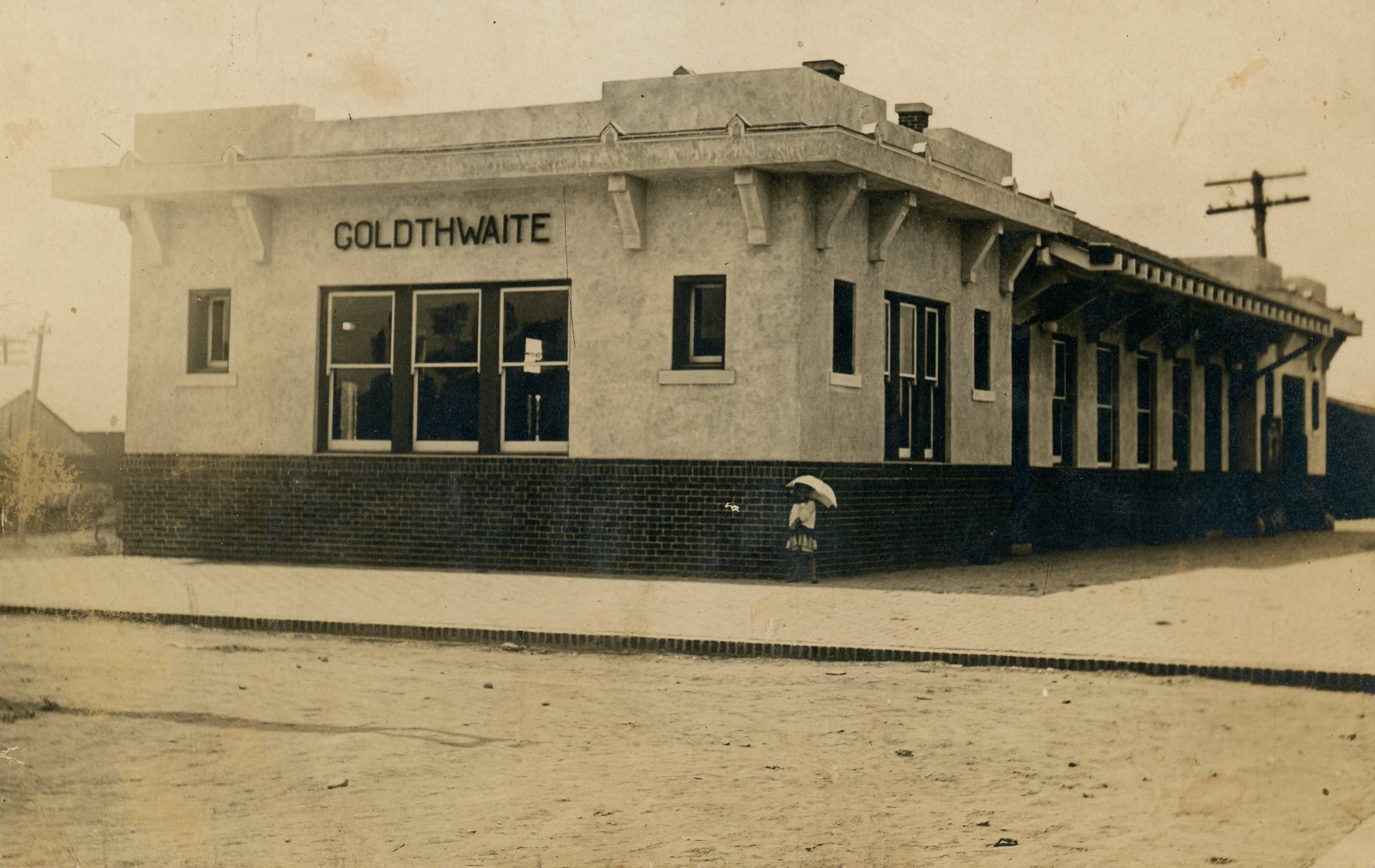
Third passenger depot in Goldthwaite, Texas, c. 1915-1920

The railroad had a profound impact on the development of the county. In 1885, the Gulf, Colorado, and Santa Fe Railroad laid tracks through Goldthwaite, Pegtown, and Mullin, then onto Brownwood, bypassing Williams Ranch and Center City, both of which had anticipated being stops. The primary impetus for the railroad to pass through the county was to reach San Angelo livestock markets.

The railroad created Goldthwaite and Mullin, similar to about twenty other townsites the railroad platted and auctioned along its path. On September 2, 1885, two years before Mills County formed, a GC&SFR train made a stop at Goldthwaite (then in Brown County), and on that day Thos. W. Jackson, Santa Fe Land Commissioner, begin auctioning lots that would be the foundation of the town. On December 31, 1885, regular train service began in Goldthwaite, with the town serving as a division point. By 1886, the railroad was the largest employer in the county, with thirty-six in its workforce. In 1905, the railroad boosted land ownership and farming in Mills County by offering employees the option to purchase land along its tracks through payroll deductions.

=== Major highways ===
- U.S. Highway 84
- U.S. Highway 183
- State Highway 16
- Loop 15

=== Mail ===
Before the postal service arrived in pre-Mills County in the late 1870s, mail was carried by travelers or cowboys from San Saba. The earliest known postmaster in the area was James D. Williams at Williams Ranch, who was appointed on January 16, 1877. Miss Dera Humphries is recognized as first woman mail carrier in Mills County, serving from 1921 to 1941.

Mills County post offices
Name	Date(s)
Antelope Gap	1892-1914
Big Valley	1877-1906
Bowlder	1880-1880
Caradan	1899-1972
Center City	1877-1920
Clements	1899-1899
Coy	1894-1903
Ebony	1891-1945
Goldthwaite	1886-
Gorey	1882-1883
Hannaville	1876-1882
Hydesport	1884-1887
Minor	1886-1892
Mullin	1886-
Payne [Gap]	1888-1916
Pompey	1893-1893
Priddy	1891-1895
Priddy	1899-
Ratler	1892-1929
Regency	1884-1934
Ridge	1909-1917
Scallorn	1916-1932
Sneed	1893-1900
Star	1884-
Williams Ranch	1877-1892

== Significant structures ==
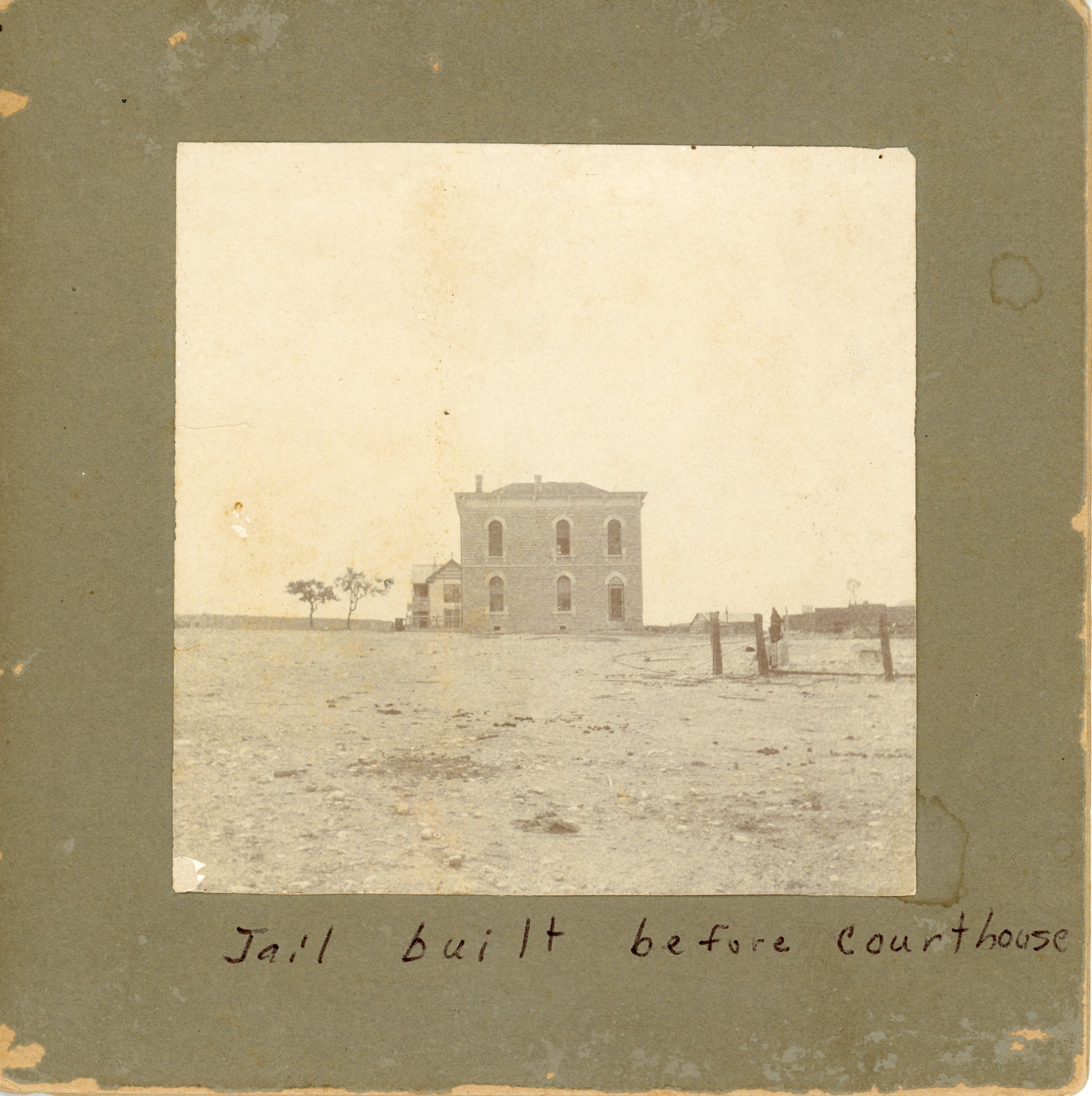
Mills County Jail c. 1888 (taken before courthouse was built)

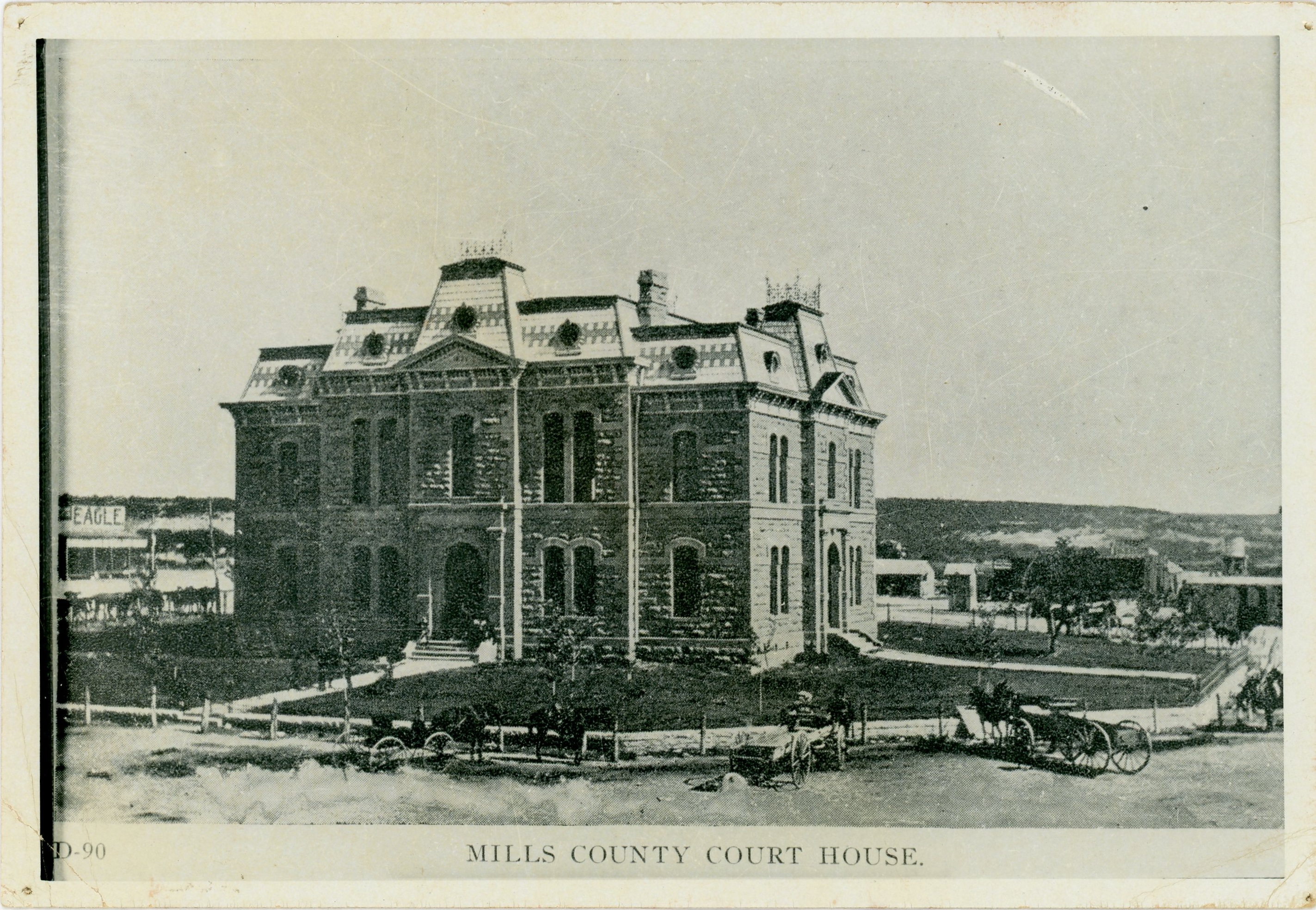
1890 Mills County Courthouse

Mills County's first courthouse, officially recognized on June 25, 1890, was built by John Cormack of Lampasas and paid by bonds amounting to $27,500. On May 5, 1912, the courthouse burned, allegedly by arson. After the fire, a controversy erupted over whether the replacement courthouse should be built in Goldthwaite or Mullin, some arguing that Mullin was closer to the center of the county and should be named the new county seat. The Texas Land Commissioner located the center of the county, closer to Goldthwaite, and marked it with a bronze marker designated "Center Point." Goldthwaite would remain the county seat. Later that year, the county hired Henry T. Phelps to design and specify a new courthouse, and construction was completed by the Gordon-Jones Construction Company on November 17, 1913, at a cost of around $69,000. The classical revival courthouse was recently renovated through a grant from the Texas Historic Courthouse Preservation Program. In 1915 during Jim Crow, a Confederate Memorial Monument was placed on the courthouse grounds in Goldthwaite, funded by public donations, the civic organization Self Culture Club, Jeff Davis Camp 117, and the United Confederate Veterans.

Called the "Goldthwaite Calaboose," the first jail in Mills County was ordered to be built in 1887 at a cost of $15.00. It was an eight-foot square building made of 2" x 12" lumber that was located on the south side of the courthouse square. On October 12, 1887, county judge J.B. Head began to take bids for building a new jail. The limestone jail that still stands was built by Green and Nichols of Lampasas at a cost of $8,850; it was completed in April 1888, six months and nine days following ground breaking. J.B. Dumas, the designer, specified that the upper floor contain prisoner cells and the bottom floor accommodate sheriff's offices. Diebold Safe and Lock Company made the cells and ironwork. It served as the county jail until the 1950s and was in use until 1977. In 1965, it received a Recorded Texas Historic Landmark designation and was added to the National Register of Historic Places in 1979.

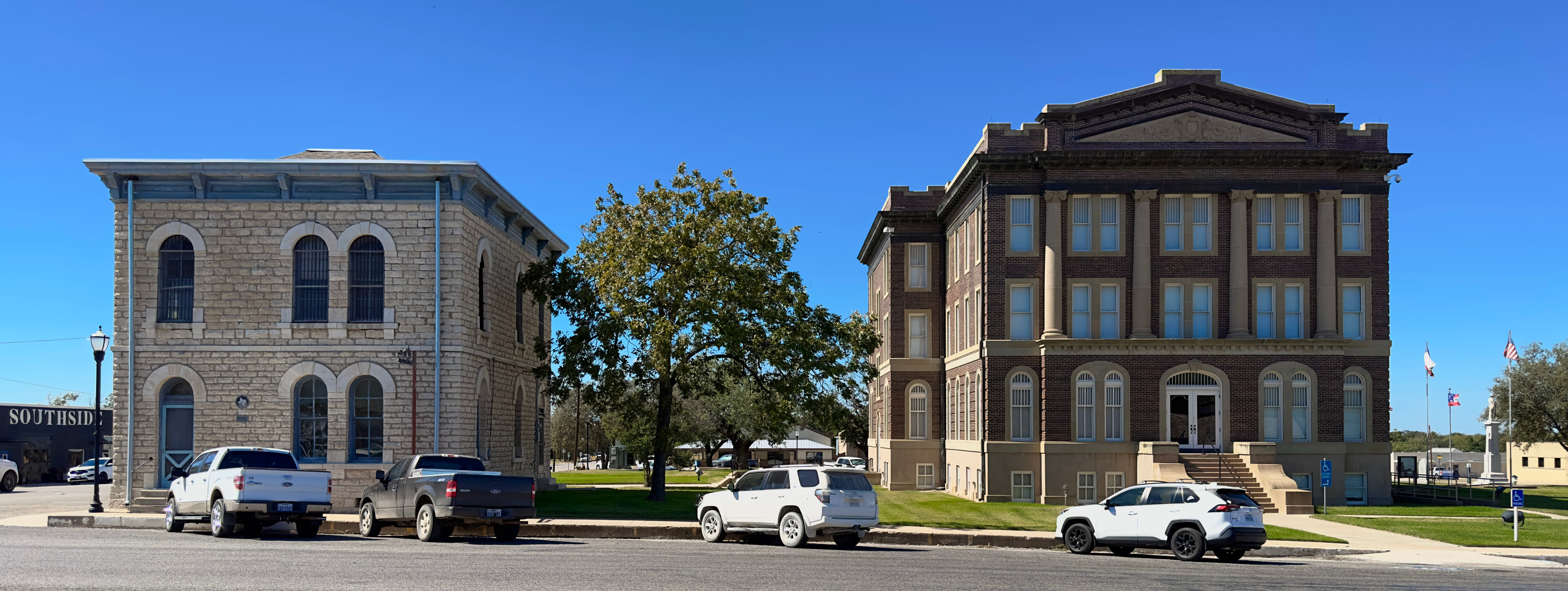
Mills County Courthouse (right) and Jail (left)

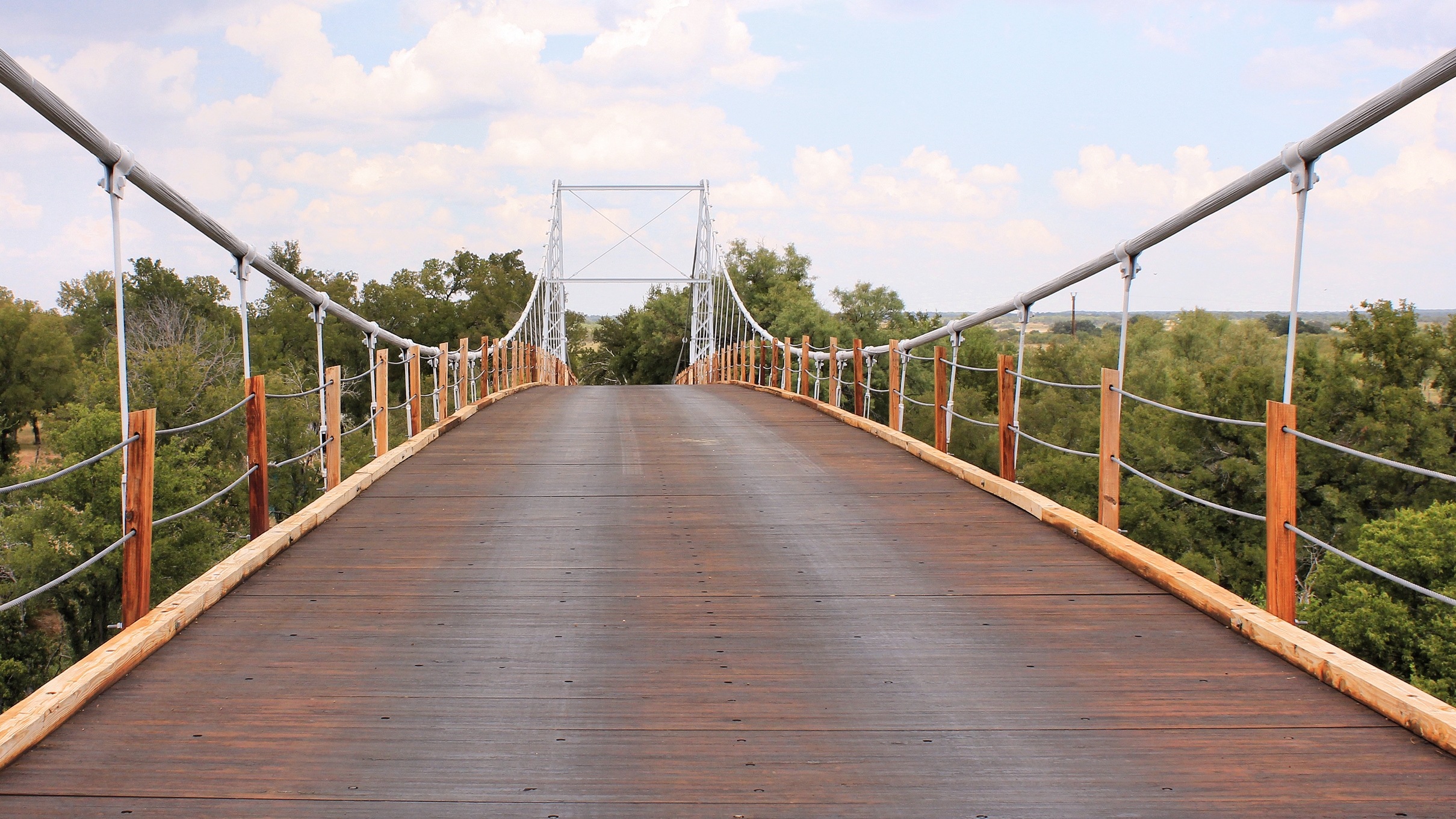
Regency Suspension Bridge spanning the Colorado River between Mills and San Saba counties

== See also ==
- List of counties in Texas
- National Register of Historic Places listings in Mills County, Texas
- Recorded Texas Historic Landmarks in Mills County
