= List of bridges documented by the Historic American Engineering Record in Texas =

This is a list of bridges documented by the Historic American Engineering Record in the U.S. state of Texas.

== Bridges ==
Survey No.	Name (as assigned by HAER)	Status	Type	Built	Documented	Carries	Crosses	Location	County	Coordinates
TX-9	Riverdale Bridge	Extant				CR 134	San Antonio River	Goliad	Goliad	28°40′19″N 97°32′35″W
TX-10	Bird Pond Road Bridge	Extant	Warren truss	1914	1987	CR 184	Carter Creek	College Station	Brazos	30°36′10″N 96°15′00″W
TX-11	Richmond Bridge	Extant	Cantilever	1925	1988	US 90 Alt. eastbound	Brazos River	Richmond	Fort Bend	29°34′58″N 95°45′28″W
TX-13	Waco Suspension Bridge	Extant	Suspension	1870	1987	Bridge Street	Brazos River	Waco	McLennan	31°33′40″N 97°07′39″W
TX-16	Works Progress Administration Bridge No. 232	Demolished	Reinforced concrete cast-in-place slab	1941	1989	Elm Creek Road		Voss	Coleman	31°32′28″N 99°39′45″W
TX-17	Works Progress Administration Bridge No. 233	Demolished	Reinforced concrete cast-in-place slab	1941	1989	Elm Creek Road		Voss	Coleman	31°32′03″N 99°39′11″W
TX-18	Works Progress Administration Bridge No. 234	Demolished	Reinforced concrete cast-in-place slab	1941	1989	Elm Creek Road	Elm Creek	Voss	Coleman	31°31′56″N 99°38′40″W
TX-20	Leaday Crossing	Demolished	Reinforced concrete cast-in-place slab	1941	1989	FM 2134	Colorado River	Voss	Coleman	31°33′17″N 99°40′39″W
TX-29	Bone Crossing Bridge	Relocated	Warren truss	1915	1996	CR 137	Cowhouse Creek	Gatesville	Coryell	31°24′28″N 97°56′03″W
TX-30	South Fork of Hill Creek Bridge	Relocated	Double-intersection Warren truss	1910	1996	Walnut Springs City Park trail	Hill Creek south fork	Walnut Springs	Bosque	32°06′37″N 97°43′35″W
TX-31	Kelley Crossing Bridge	Bypassed	Lenticular truss	1895	1996	CR 186	Plum Creek	Lockhart	Caldwell	29°52′55″N 97°37′49″W
TX-32; TX-113	Comal Creek Bridge a.k.a. Landa Street Bridge	Extant	Reinforced concrete cast-in-place slab	1929	1996; 2007	Bus. SH 46 (Landa Street)	Comal Creek	New Braunfels	Comal	29°42′18″N 98°07′45″W
TX-33	Dallas–Oak Cliff Viaduct (Houston Street Viaduct)	Extant	Reinforced concrete open-spandrel arch	1912	1996	Houston Street	Trinity River	Dallas and Oak Cliff	Dallas	32°45′55″N 96°48′45″W
TX-34	Corinth Street Viaduct	Extant	Steel built-up girder	1933	1996	Corinth Street	Trinity River	Dallas and Oak Cliff	Dallas	32°45′21″N 96°47′45″W
TX-35	Commerce Street Viaduct	Extant	Steel built-up girder	1930	1996	Commerce Street	Trinity River	Dallas and Oak Cliff	Dallas	32°46′31″N 96°49′13″W
TX-36	Bluff Dale Suspension Bridge (Note: See also HAER No. TX-104, "Structural Study of Texas Cable-Supported Bridges" for additional documentation)	Bypassed	Cable-stayed (not suspension)	1890	1996	CR 149 (Berry's Creek Road)	Paluxy River	Bluff Dale	Erath	32°21′14″N 98°01′34″W
TX-37	Galveston Causeway	Extant	Reinforced concrete closed-spandrel arch	1922	1996	Gulf, Colorado and Santa Fe Railway	Galveston Bay	Galveston and Texas City	Galveston	29°17′50″N 94°53′08″W
TX-38	Iron Ore Creek Bridge	Relocated	Warren truss	1911	1996	CR 597	Iron Ore Creek	Denison	Grayson	33°43′03″N 96°34′10″W
TX-39	Little Mineral Creek Bridge	Relocated	Warren truss	1913	1996	CR 456	Little Mineral Creek	Pottsboro	Grayson	33°47′15″N 96°40′8″W
TX-40	White Oak Bayou Bridge	Replaced	Steel built-up girder (concrete-encased)	1922	1996	Heights Boulevard	White Oak Bayou	Houston	Harris	29°46′31″N 95°23′51″W
TX-41	Canadian River Wagon Bridge	Bypassed	Parker truss	1916	1996	US 60 (former)	Canadian River	Canadian	Hemphill	35°55′44″N 100°22′29″W
TX-42	Stinnett Road Bridge	Bypassed	Warren truss	1926	1996	CR 225	Canadian River	Borger	Hutchinson	35°44′50″N 101°20′49″W
TX-43	Rainbow Bridge	Extant	Cantilever	1938	1996	SH 73 / SH 87 westbound	Neches River	Port Arthur and Bridge City	Jefferson and Orange	29°58′47″N 93°52′18″W
TX-44	Rocky Creek Bridge	Relocated	Pratt truss	1919	1996	Hilltop Road	Boggy Creek	Shiner	Lavaca	29°25′58″N 97°10′04″W
TX-45	Broad Street Bridge	Extant	Reinforced concrete truss	1918	1996	Broad Street	Comanche Creek	Mason	Mason	30°45′09″N 99°13′53″W
TX-46	Beveridge Bridge	Bypassed	Suspension	1896	1996	CR 112	San Saba River	San Saba	San Saba	31°12′39″N 98°44′27″W
TX-47	Sabine River Bridge	Replaced 2015	Steel built-up girder	1936	1996	US 84	Sabine River	Joaquin, Texas, and Logansport, Louisiana	Shelby County, Texas, and DeSoto Parish, Louisiana	31°58′20″N 94°00′25″W
TX-48	West Lancaster Street Bridge	Extant	Viaduct	1938	1996	West Lancaster Avenue	Trinity River Clear Fork	Fort Worth	Tarrant	32°44′49″N 97°20′57″W
TX-49	Belknap Street Viaduct	Replaced	Viaduct	1934	1996	US 377 (Belknap Street) (former)	Union Pacific Railroad et al.	Fort Worth	Tarrant	32°45′46″N 97°19′24″W
TX-50	Main Street Viaduct	Extant	Viaduct	1914	1996	Main Street	Trinity River West Fork	Fort Worth	Tarrant	32°45′33″N 97°20′04″W
TX-51	West Sixth Street Bridge	Extant	Stone arch	1887	1996	West Sixth Street	Shoal Creek	Austin	Travis	30°16′14″N 97°45′05″W
TX-52	Medina River Bridge	Bypassed	Reinforced concrete open-spandrel arch	1910	1996	Pleasanton Road	Medina River	San Antonio	Bexar	29°15′50″N 98°29′28″W
TX-53	Yegua Creek Bridge	Relocated	Pratt truss	1890	1996	CR 241 (Cedar Hill Road)	Tommelson Creek	Brenham	Washington	30°14′38″N 96°25′18″W
TX-54	Jimmie's Creek Bridge	Relocated	Pratt truss	1908	1996	CR 165 (Indian Creek Road)	Indian Creek	Comanche	Comanche	31°53′36″N 98°37′19″W
TX-55	Coryell County Historic Bridge	Relocated	Pratt truss	1891	1996	CR 322	Leon River	Oglesby	Coryell	31°22′52″N 97°34′10″W
TX-56	Choctaw Bottoms Road Bridge	Replaced	Warren truss		1996	Choctaw Bottoms Road	Choctaw Creek	Denison	Grayson	33°43′07″N 96°25′53″W
TX-57	Stephenville Crossing Bridge	Relocated	Pratt truss	1897	1996	CR 176	Leon River	Hamilton	Hamilton	31°46′29″N 98°08′59″W
TX-58	Sycamore Creek Bridge	Replaced	Pratt truss	1911	1996	CR 288	Sycamore Creek	Hamilton	Hamilton	31°41′22″N 97°58′32″W
TX-59	Brushy Creek Bridge	Replaced	Pratt truss	1911	1996	CR 398	Brushy Creek	Thorndale	Milam	30°36′19″N 97°11′20″W
TX-60	Bryant Station Bridge	Bypassed	Parker truss	1909	1996	CR 275	Little River	Bryant Station	Milam	30°50′52″N 97°11′42″W
TX-61	Regency Suspension Bridge	Extant	Suspension	1939	1996	CR 126	Colorado River	Goldthwaite and San Saba	Mills and San Saba	31°24′37″N 98°50′46″W
TX-62	Possum Kingdom Stone Arch Bridge	Extant	Stone arch	1942	1996	SH 16	Brazos River	Graford	Palo Pinto	32°51′30″N 98°24′42″W
TX-63	Fort Griffin Iron Truss Bridge	Extant	Pratt truss	1885	1996	CR 188	Clear Fork Brazos River	Fort Griffin	Shackelford	32°56′5″N 99°13′28″W
TX-64	Clear Fork of Brazos River Suspension Bridge	Extant	Suspension	1896	1996	CR 179	Clear Fork Brazos River	Albany	Shackelford	32°55′18″N 99°10′05″W
TX-65	Waters Bluff Bridge	Replaced	Parker truss	1911	1996	CR 353	Sabine River	Winona and Big Sandy	Smith and Upshur	32°32′55″N 95°08′00″W
TX-66	Oriana Bridge	Bypassed	Parker truss	1917	1996	CR 207	Salt Fork Brazos River	Peacock	Stonewall	33°10′15″N 100°26′02″W
TX-67	Ward Brazos River Bridge	Bypassed	Pratt truss and Warren truss	1916	1996	CR 109	Salt Fork Brazos River	Aspermont	Stonewall	33°18′12″N 100°20′35″W
TX-68	Wilson County Camelback Bridge	Bypassed	Parker truss	1885	1996	CR 117	San Antonio River	Calaveras	Wilson	29°12′55″N 98°15′41″W
TX-70	Galveston, Harrisburg, and San Antonio Railway, Clear Creek Bridge	Demolished	Center-bearing swing span	1907		Galveston, Harrisburg, and San Antonio Railway	Clear Creek	Seabrook	Harris	29°32′58″N 95°01′26″W
TX-71	Galveston, Harrisburg, and San Antonio Railway, Dickinson Bayou Bridge	Demolished	Center-bearing swing span	1907		Galveston, Harrisburg, and San Antonio Railway	Dickinson Bayou	San Leon	Galveston	29°27′39″N 94°58′26″W
TX-75	Southern Pacific Railroad, Pecos River Bridge	Extant	Viaduct	1944	1998	Southern Pacific Railroad	Pecos River	Langtry	Val Verde	29°45′31″N 101°21′27″W
TX-77	Southern Pacific Railroad Bridge	Extant	Viaduct	1900	2000	Southern Pacific Railroad	Rio Grande	El Paso, Texas, and Sunland Park, New Mexico	El Paso County, Texas, and Doña Ana County, New Mexico	31°47′14″N 106°31′39″W
TX-78	El Paso and Southwestern Railroad, Rio Grande Bridge	Extant	Viaduct		2000	El Paso and Southwestern Railroad	Rio Grande	El Paso, Texas, and Sunland Park, New Mexico	El Paso County, Texas, and Doña Ana County, New Mexico	31°47′20″N 106°31′37″W
TX-79	East Navidad River Bridge	Extant	Reinforced concrete girder	1923	2000	FM 1579	East Navidad River	Schulenburg	Fayette	29°40′59″N 96°50′47″W
TX-80	McKee Street Bridge	Extant	Reinforced concrete girder	1932	2000	McKee Street	Buffalo Bayou	Houston	Harris	29°45′57″N 95°21′07″W
TX-81	Rock Church Suspension Bridge	Extant	Suspension	1917	2000	Private road	Paluxy River	Tolar	Hood	32°18′05″N 97°57′28″W
TX-82	Maury Maverick Bridge	Replaced	Warren truss	1932	2000	CR 207	San Antonio River	Falls City	Karnes	28°58′12″N 98°38′53″W
TX-83	North Bosque River Bridge	Bypassed	Reinforced concrete girder	1933	2000	SH 6	North Bosque River	Clairette	Erath	32°02′23″N 98°06′38″W
TX-84	Decatur Street Bridge	Extant	Stone arch		2000	Decatur Street	Dry Creek	Chico	Wise	33°17′38″N 97°47′40″W
TX-85	Choctaw Creek Bridge	Abandoned	Suspension	1915	2000	Abandoned road	Choctaw Creek	Bells	Grayson	33°39′05″N 96°28′51″W
TX-86	Keller–Haslet Road Bridge	Demolished	Warren truss	1929	2000	FM 156	Henrietta Creek	Haslet	Tarrant	32°58′30″N 97°19′16″W
TX-87	Barton Creek Bridge	Abandoned	Cable-stayed	1890	2000	CR 119	Barton Creek	Huckabay	Erath	32°30′22″N 98°21′01″W
TX-88	Trinity River Bridge	Extant	Reinforced concrete girder	1932	2000	US 377 (East Belknap Street)	Trinity River	Fort Worth	Tarrant	32°46′05″N 97°18′45″W
TX-89	Stockyards Viaduct	Replaced	Viaduct	1935	2000	SH 183 (Northeast 28th Street)	Atchison, Topeka and Santa Fe Railway and BNSF Railway	Fort Worth	Tarrant	32°47′43″N 97°20′39″W
TX-90	Lamar–McKinney Street Viaduct	Extant	Viaduct	1931	2000	Continental Avenue	Trinity River	Dallas	Dallas	32°46′51″N 96°49′22″W
TX-91	Missouri, Kansas and Texas Railroad Underpass	Replaced	Steel built-up girder	1910	2000	Missouri–Kansas–Texas Railroad	Bus. US 287 – Fort Worth	Fort Worth	Tarrant	32°43′59″N 97°19′23″W
TX-92	Houston and Texas Central Railroad Underpass	Replaced	Steel built-up girder	1910	2000	Houston and Texas Central Railway	Bus. US 287 – Fort Worth	Fort Worth	Tarrant	32°43′59″N 97°19′20″W
TX-93	Fort Worth and Denver City Railroad Underpass	Extant	Steel rolled multi-beam	1935	2000	BNSF Railway	SH 183 (Northeast 28th Street)	Fort Worth	Tarrant	32°47′42″N 97°20′19″W
TX-94	St. Louis Southwestern Railway Underpass	Replaced	Steel rolled multi-beam	1935	2000	Dallas Area Rapid Transit	SH 183 (Northeast 28th Street)	Fort Worth	Tarrant	32°47′42″N 97°20′17″W
TX-95	Gulf, Colorado and Santa Fe Railway Underpass	Replaced	Steel built-up girder	1936	2000	Atchison, Topeka and Santa Fe Railway	Bus. US 287 – Fort Worth	Fort Worth	Tarrant	32°43′59″N 97°19′19″W
TX-96	South San Gabriel River Bridge	Extant	Steel rolled multi-beam	1939	2000	I-35 BL – Georgetown	San Gabriel River south fork	Georgetown	Williamson	30°38′34″N 97°40′41″W
TX-97	North San Gabriel River Bridge	Extant	Steel rolled multi-beam	1939	2000	I-35 BL – Georgetown	San Gabriel River north fork	Georgetown	Williamson	30°38′43″N 97°40′42″W
TX-98	Texas Suspension Bridges		Cable-stayed and Suspension		2000			Austin	Travis	
TX-98-A	Texas Suspension Bridges, Dr. Flinn's Model and Builders Plate		Suspension		2000			Austin	Travis	
TX-99	South Presa Street Bridge	Extant	Lenticular truss		2001	South Presa Street	San Antonio River	San Antonio	Bexar	29°25′22″N 98°29′23″W
TX-100	Crockett Street Bridge	Extant	Lenticular truss		2001	East Crockett Street	San Antonio River	San Antonio	Bexar	29°25′30″N 98°29′19″W
TX-101	Augusta Street Bridge	Extant	Lenticular truss		2001	Augusta Street	San Antonio River	San Antonio	Bexar	29°25′49″N 98°29′33″W
TX-102	Commerce Street Bridge Towers	Relocated			2001	West Johnson Street	San Antonio River	San Antonio	Bexar	29°24′48″N 98°29′44″W
TX-103	Brackenridge Park Bridge	Extant	Lenticular truss	1890	2001	Brackenridge Way	San Antonio River	San Antonio	Bexar	29°27′48″N 98°28′09″W
TX-104	Structural Study of Texas Cable-Supported Bridges		Cable-stayed and suspension		2000	Structural analyses of Bluff Dale Suspension Bridge et al.	Paluxy River and San Saba River	Austin	Travis	
TX-118	Evans Road Cattle Pass Rock Structure	Replaced	Reinforced concrete cast-in-place slab	1941	2010	Evans Road	Elm Waterhole Creek	San Antonio	Bexar	29°38′53″N 98°24′42″W
TX-123	Little Pine Island Bayou Bridge	Demolished	Timber stringer		2003	Lumber Road	Little Pine Island Bayou	Sour Lake	Hardin	30°10′7″N 94°17′49″W
TX-3398	West Martin Street at Alazan Creek Bridge	Replaced	Prestressed concrete slab	1964	2014	West Martin Street	Alazan Creek	San Antonio	Bexar	29°25′52″N 98°30′57″W
TX-3399	Fabens–Caseta International Bridge	Demolished	Steel rolled stringer	1938	2015	Island Guadalupe Road	Rio Grande	Fabens, Texas, and Guadalupe, Chihuahua	El Paso County, Texas, and Guadalupe Municipality, Chihuahua	31°25′49″N 106°08′34″W
TX-3403	El Paso Brick Company Bridge	Extant	Steel built-up girder	1931	2017	El Paso and Southwestern Railroad	Rio Grande	El Paso, Texas, and Sunland Park, New Mexico	El Paso County, Texas, and Doña Ana County, New Mexico	31°47′13″N 106°31′38″W
