= East Navidad River Bridge =

- U.S. National Register of Historic Places
- Recorded Texas Historic Landmark
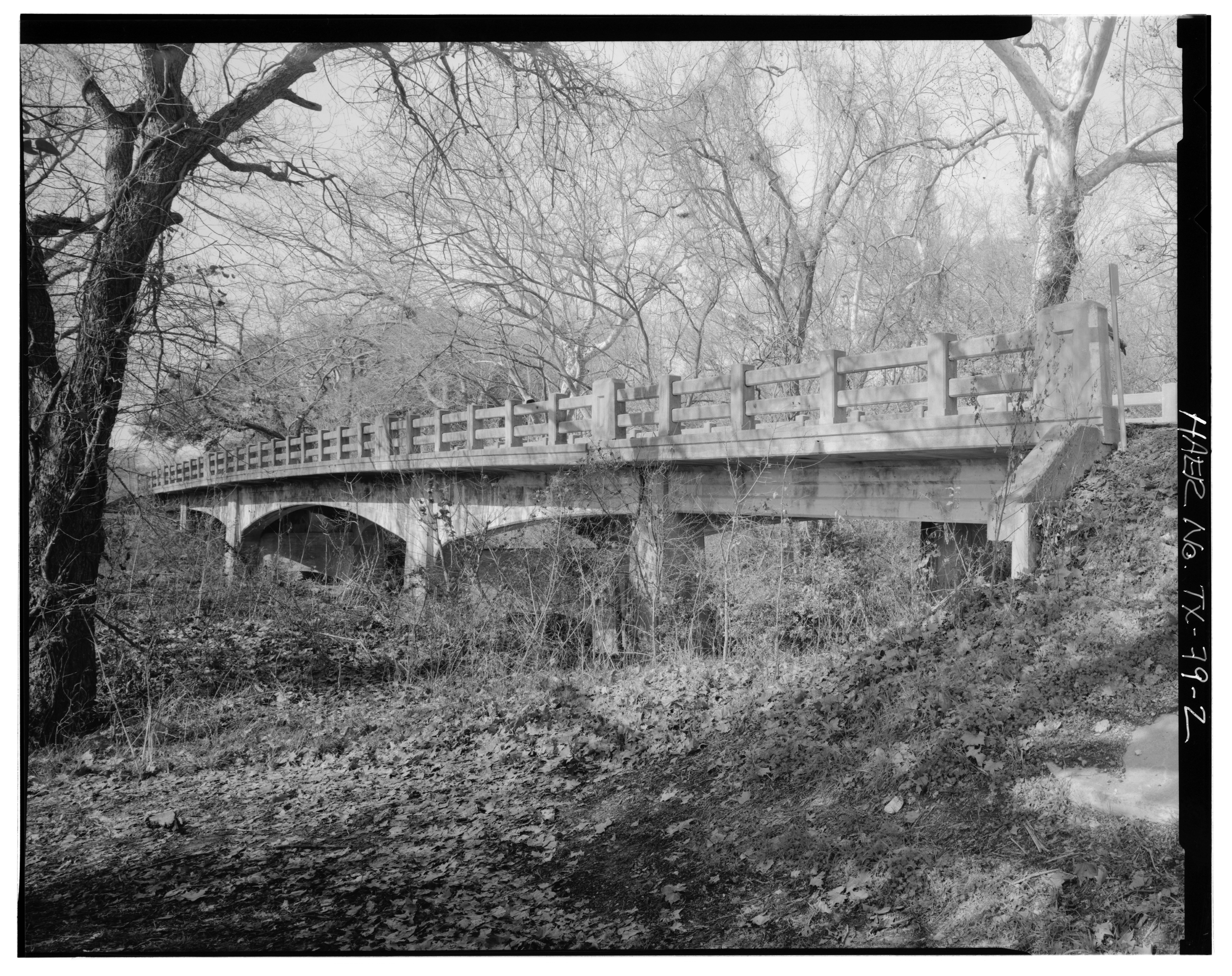
- East Navidad River Bridge in 2001

- Location within Texas Location within the United States
- Location: FM 1579 at East Navidad River
- Nearest city: Schulenberg, Texas
- Coordinates: 29°40′59″N 96°50′47″W
- Built: 1922
- Built by: State of Texas and Fayette County
- Architect: A. T. Granger (Bridge Designer)
- Engineer: Jerome Peyton Kearby, Jr.
- State Bridge Engineer: George Wickline
- NRHP reference No.: 14000497

Significant dates
- Added to NRHP: August 18, 2014
- Delisted RTHL: 2014

The East Navidad River Bridge, also known as the State Highway 3 Bridge at East Navidad River, is a historic concrete bridge that carries FM 1579 across the East Navidad River about 3.4 miles (5.5 km) east of Schulenberg in Fayette County, Texas. The 199-foot-long (61 m) cantilever bridge has a 70-foot (21 m) center span. Concrete piers and abutments support the two cantilever arms. The total width of the bridge is 21.17 feet (6.45 m), providing an 18-foot-wide (5.5 m) roadway. The bridge gives the appearance of an arch but is in fact two cantilevered arms joined in the center of the main span and anchored and countered at the ends. Concrete piers with skewed abutments provide support.

It was a joint project of the state of Texas and Fayette county. Funding originated at the federal level with the Federal Aid Act of 1921 and continued with State Aid Project No. 256 A and county contributions. Completed in November 1922 it was designed by Armour Townsend Granger who is listed as designer on the name plates of the bridge, as engineer by the Texas Department of Highways but as draftsman in employment records. The State Bridge Engineer was George Wickline. Jerome Peyton Kearby, Jr. was the Fayette County Resident Engineer. Lake Robertson was the contractor.

== Photo gallery ==
HAER photographs of the East Navidad River Bridge from 2001
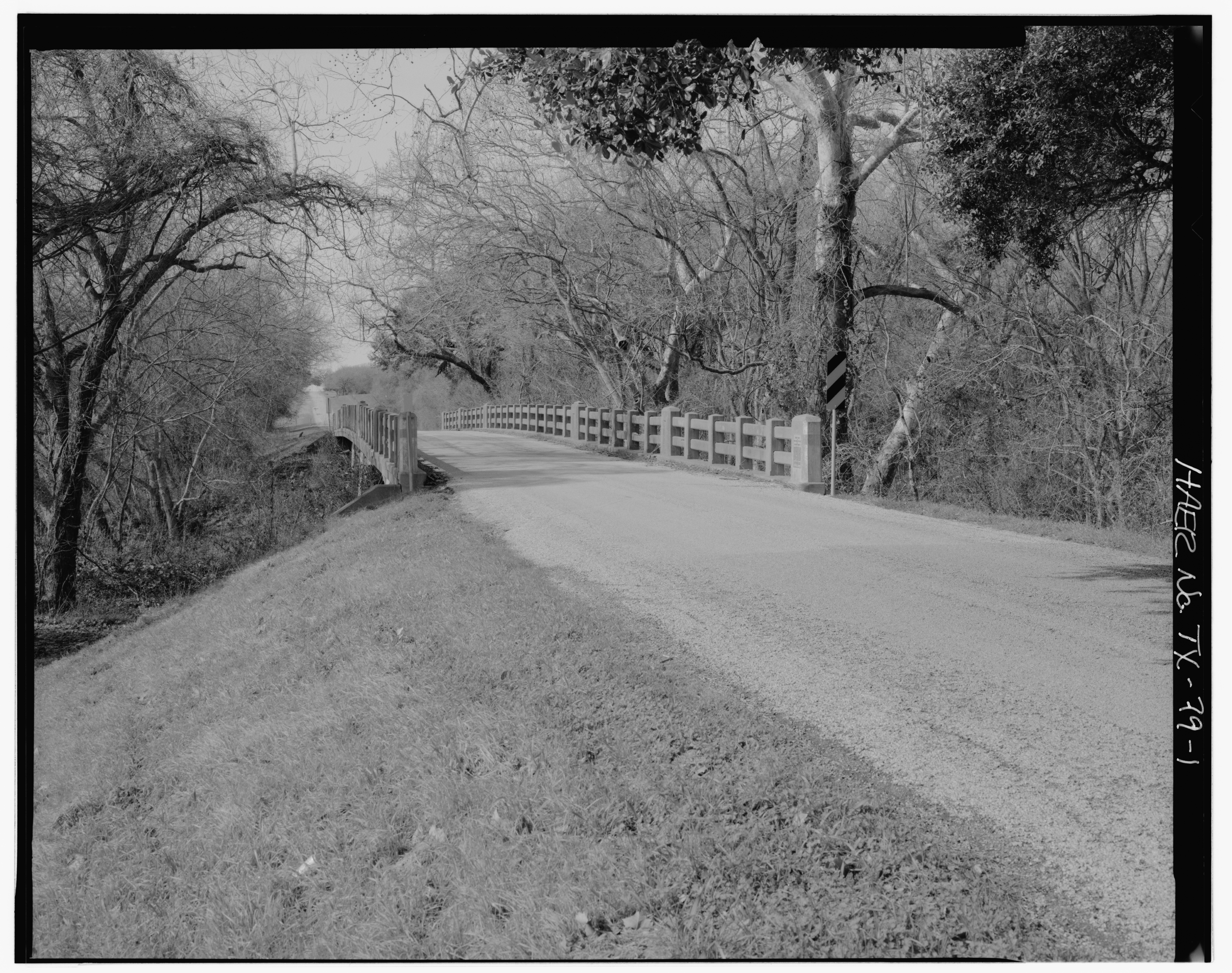
East approach looking west

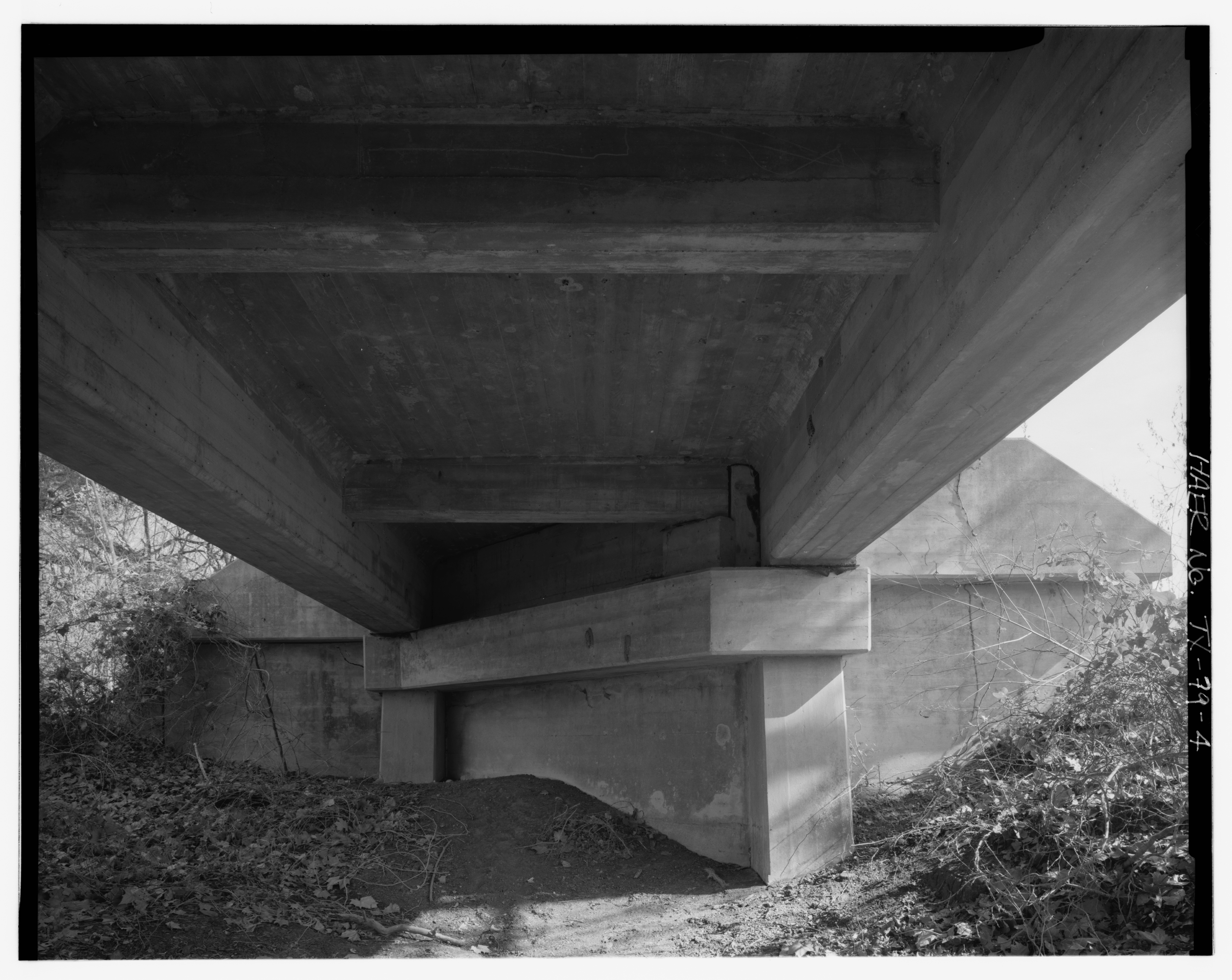
Looking east under the bridge from close to the east side the east abutment is seen

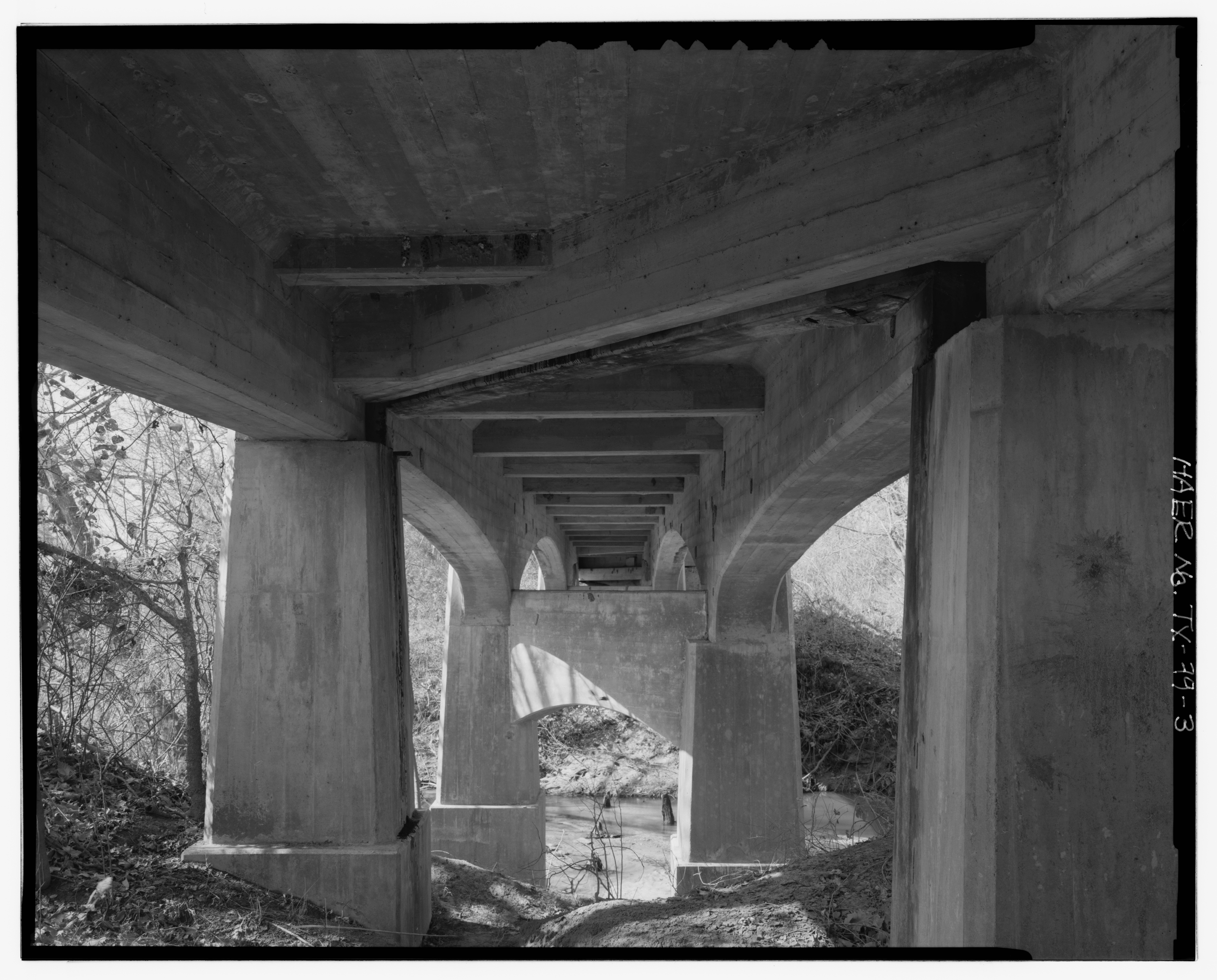
Looking west from the east side of the central span from below the skewed substructure is seen

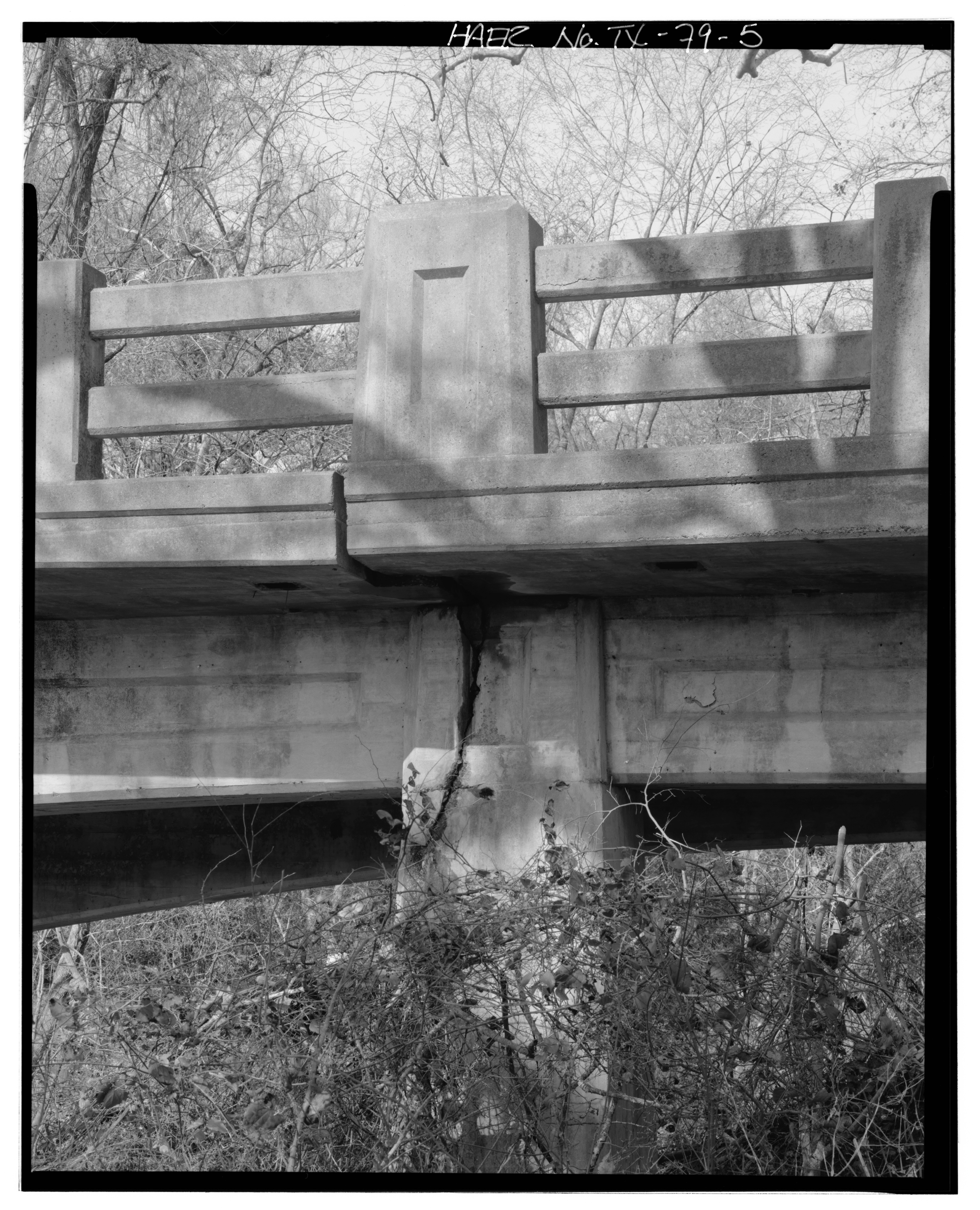
South exposure detail showing chamfered corners and incised panels

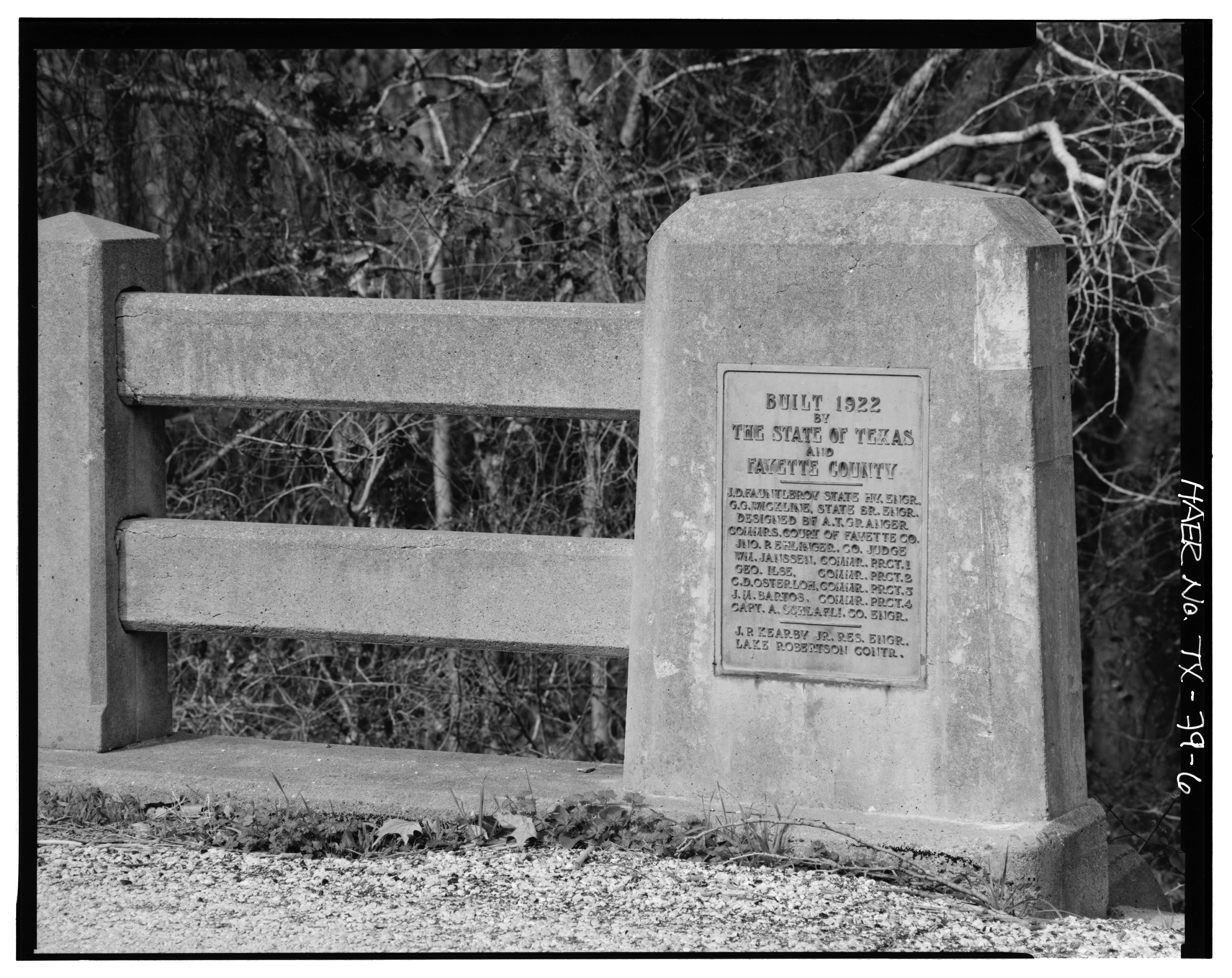
Builder's plate on east end of bridge
Photography: Bruce Harms

== See also ==
- List of bridges documented by the Historic American Engineering Record in Texas
- National Register of Historic Places listings in Fayette County, Texas
