= Bluff Dale Suspension Bridge =

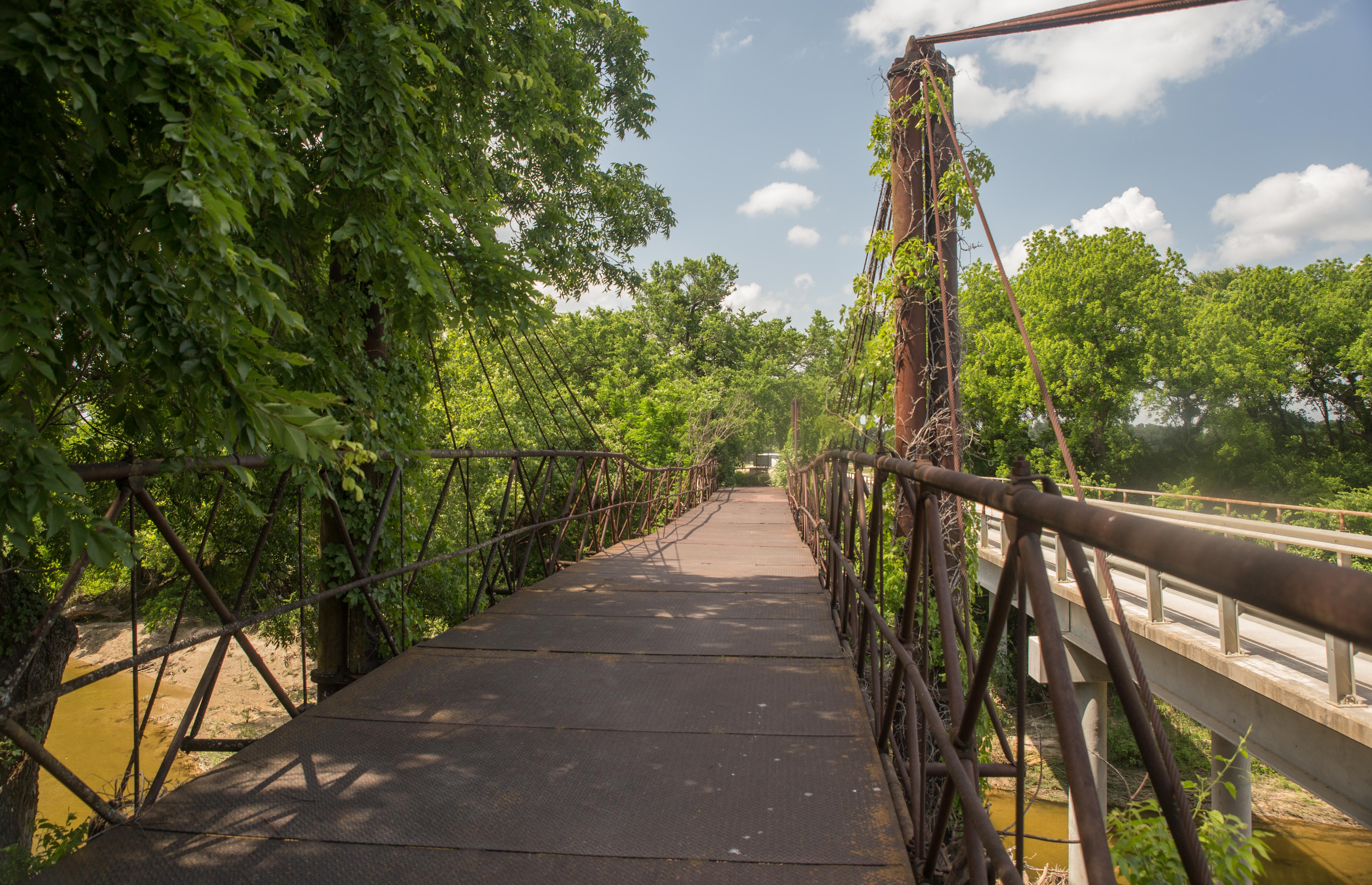
- Bluff Dale Bridge, with the modern bridge that has replaced it for vehicle traffic visible at right.
- Coordinates: 32°21′14″N 98°1′34″W
- Carries: Pedestrian way on County Road 49 (Berry's Creek Road)
- Crosses: Paluxy River
- Locale: Berry's Creek Road, Bluff Dale, Texas
- Owner: Erath County

Characteristics
- Design: Cable-stayed
- Material: Wrought iron
- Total length: 200 feet (61 m)
- Width: 13 feet (4.0 m)
- Longest span: 140 feet (43 m)
- No. of spans: 3
- Piers in water: 2

History
- Designer: Edwin Elijah Runyon
- Construction start: 1890
- Construction end: 1890
- Bluff Dale Bridge (Note: The bridge's historic name as listed on the National Register was changed from "Bluff Dale Suspension Bridge" to "Bluff Dale Bridge" on January 19, 2016.)
- U.S. National Register of Historic Places
- Texas State Antiquities Landmark
- Location within Texas Location within the United States
- Area: 1 acre (0.40 ha)
- NRHP reference No.: 77001440
- TSAL No.: 8200000250

Significant dates
- Added to NRHP: December 20, 1977
- Designated TSAL: May 28, 1981

Location
- Interactive map of Bluff Dale Suspension Bridge

The Bluff Dale Bridge is a historic cable-stayed bridge (not a suspension bridge) located near Bluff Dale, Texas, United States. Built in 1891, the bridge spans 225 feet (69 m) across the Paluxy River. The road deck is 28 feet (8.5 m) above the river and held in place by fourteen 1-inch-diameter (2.5 cm) cables attached to the towers made of 9-inch-diameter (23 cm) iron pipe.

== History ==
The bridge was originally constructed across the river on a dirt road that became Texas State Highway 10, which is now U.S. Route 377. In 1933, a new bridge was built to handle the increasing traffic on U.S. 377. The old bridge was relocated 1.5 miles (2.4 km) upstream in 1934 and extended from 200 to 225 feet (61 to 69 m).

The bridge was added to the National Register of Historic Places on December 20, 1977. The bridge is on Preservation Texas' 2009 list of most endangered places due to its poor condition and lack of funds for restoration. It was closed to vehicular traffic in 1989 because of its advanced state of deterioration.

== Structure type ==
Despite the name given in Historic American Engineering Record documentation, the Bluff Dale Suspension Bridge is actually a cable-stayed structure. Its deck is suspended from multiple layers of stay cables radiating from the towers, some terminating at the deck and others running continuously from one tower to the other. This pattern of cables was established in designer Edwin Elijah Runyon's first U.S. patent, US 394,940. It is known as one of only two examples of Runyon's patents, along with the Barton Creek Bridge in Huckabay, Texas. Its hand-twisted wire cable and non-traditional use of wrought-iron pipe components make it a notable example of vernacular American bridge construction.

== See also ==
- List of bridges documented by the Historic American Engineering Record in Texas
- List of bridges on the National Register of Historic Places in Texas
- National Register of Historic Places listings in Erath County, Texas
