= Barton Creek Bridge =

Bridge in Texas, United States

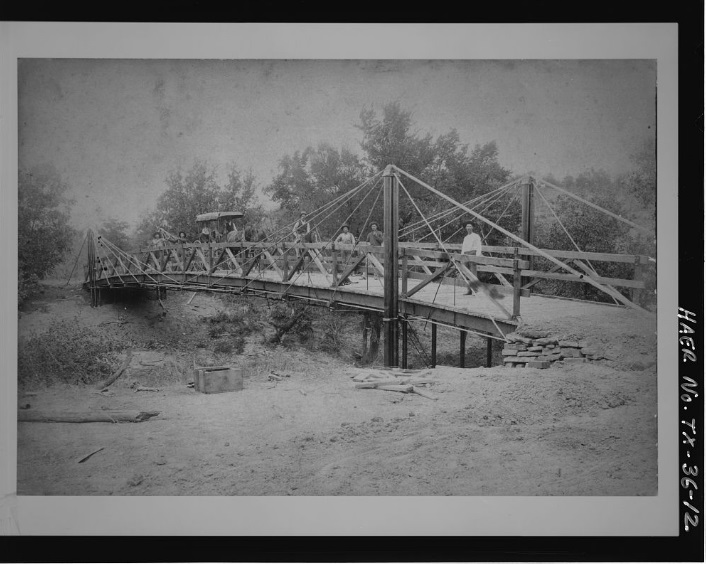
- Barton Creek Bridge, shortly after its completion in 1890
- Coordinates: 32°30′22″N 98°21′01″W
- Crosses: Barton Creek
- Locale: Huckabay, Texas
- Heritage status: Historic American Engineering Record

Characteristics
- Total length: 120 ft (37 m)
- Longest span: 100 ft (30 m)

History
- Engineering design by: Runyon Bridge Company
- Closed: 1930s

Barton Creek Bridge is an early example of a cable stayed bridge; it spans Barton Creek in Huckabay, Texas. Built 1890 by Runyon Bridge Company, it was bypassed and abandoned in the 1930s and now lies in ruins. The bridge was brought to the attention of the Historic American Engineering Record in 2000, when it was found to bear a striking resemblance to the Bluff Dale Suspension Bridge, which had at the time, been considered the only example of a Runyon patent cable-stayed bridge. It has a total length of 120 ft (37 m), with the main span being 100 ft (30 m).

== See also ==
- List of bridges documented by the Historic American Engineering Record in Texas
