= McKee Street Bridge =

Bridge in Houston, Texas, U.S.

- U.S. National Register of Historic Places
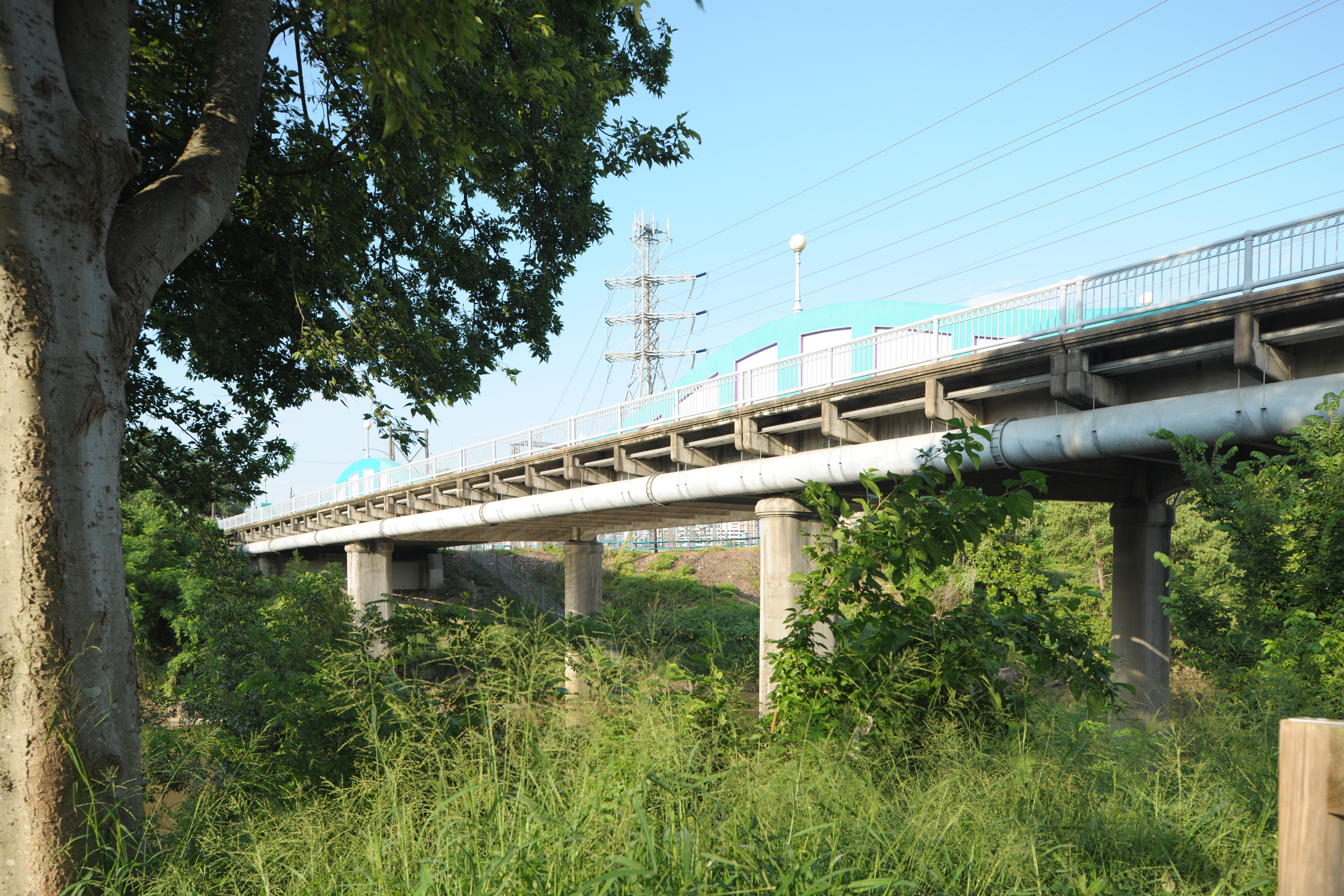
- The bridge in 2010

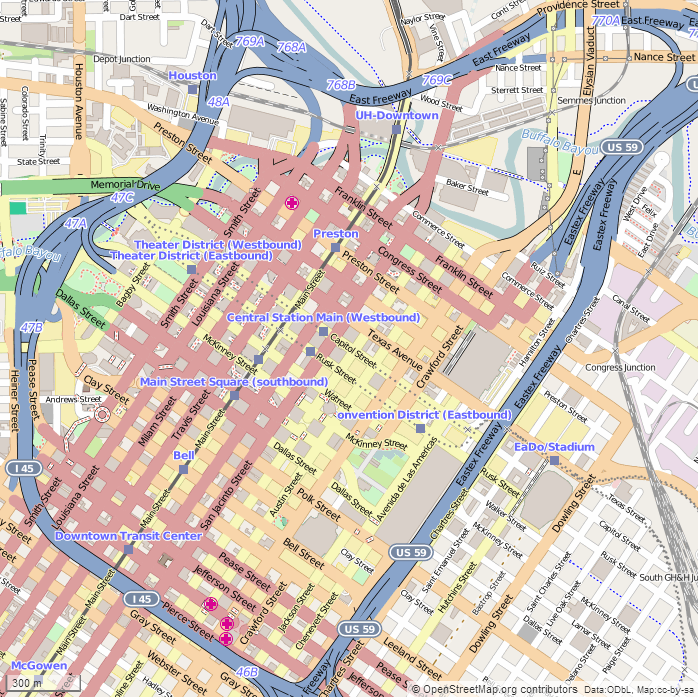
- Location within Houston Downtown Location within Texas Location within the United States
- Location: McKee Street and Buffalo Bayou, Houston, Texas
- Coordinates: 29°45′57″N 95°21′7″W
- Area: less than one acre
- Built: 1932
- Built by: Don Hall Constructors, Inc.
- Architect: Joseph Gordon (J. G.) McKenzie
- Architectural style: Moderne
- MPS: Historic Bridges of Texas MPS
- NRHP reference No.: 02000729
- Added to NRHP: September 3, 2002

The McKee Street Bridge carries McKee Street across Buffalo Bayou in Houston, Texas. Built in 1932, the three-span reinforced concrete girder bridge connects the Second and Fifth Ward areas, northeast of downtown Houston. The bridge was listed on the National Register of Historic Places on September 3, 2002.

== Description ==
The 290-foot-long (88 m) continuous girder bridge is divided into two 85-foot (26 m) spans and a center 120-foot (37 m) span. The center span crosses the entire central channel of Buffalo Bayou. The bridge provides 42 feet (13 m) of vertical clearance. As it is located between two bends in the bayou and crosses it at an angle, the design also allows for 100 feet (30 m) of horizontal clearance to accommodate the small craft traveling the bayou at the time it was built. The road surface atop the concrete deck is 2.5-inch (64 mm) brick on a 1-inch (25 mm) sand cushion. The concrete girders are curved in a way that is aesthetically pleasing and reveals the distribution of the bridge's load on the girders. The bridge was painted aquamarine, purple, and lavender by a local artist in 1985.

== History ==
Buffalo Bayou was an import trade route between Houston and Galveston Bay as early as 1836. Steamboat service was established in 1837. The area around the future McKee Street had become a major industrial and commercial center by the start of the twentieth century. The new automobile as well as continued growth in train and bayou transportation required more, and better, bridges. The first bridge built at McKee street was a steel truss swing bridge, using a motor to move the bridge out of the way of water traffic.

The 1932 bridge was built to replace the 1908 bridge that had been demolished in 1928. A requirement by the War Department for both a minimum vertical and horizontal clearance, coupled with McKee Street meeting the bayou at a 77-degree angle required a new bridge that was unique for its time. The concrete girders, usually designed as any other type of wood or steel beam, were instead shaped to match the calculated bending moment curve, resulting in reduced cost and a longer span. Indeed, the central span was the longest of any concrete girder bridge at the time, and the undulating wave-like shape had also never been used before. The bridge was built between 1931 and 1932 for a contracted price, including removal of the previous bridge, of $122,000.

== See also ==
- List of bridges documented by the Historic American Engineering Record in Texas
- National Register of Historic Places listings in Harris County, Texas
