= Cable-stayed bridge =

Type of bridge with cables directly from towers to deck

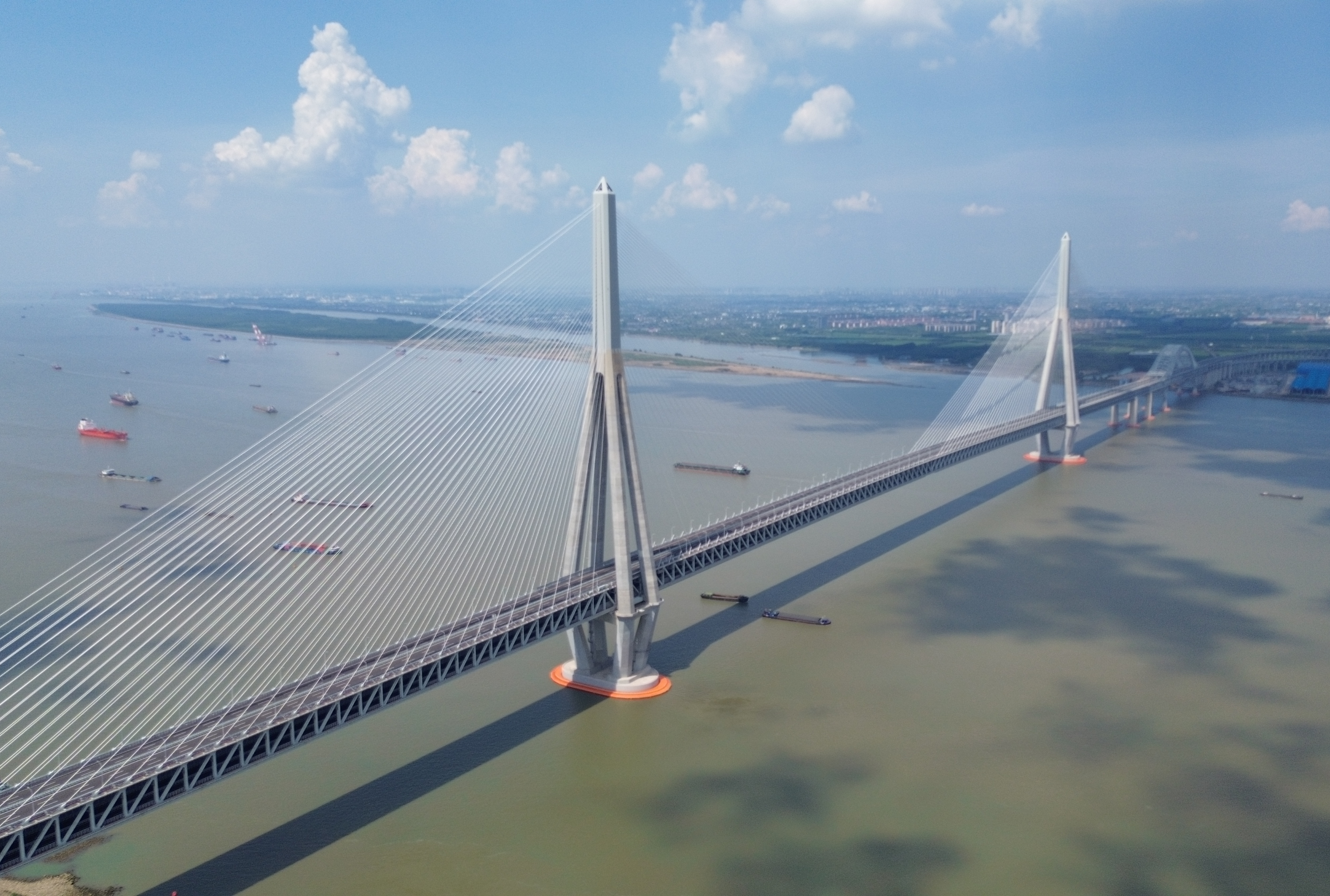
- The Changtai Yangtze River Bridge in Jiangsu province, China has a main span of 1,176 metres (3,858 ft), the world's longest cable-stayed bridge span as of 2026.
- Span range: Medium to long
- Material: Steel rope, post-tensioned concrete box girders, steel or concrete pylons
- Movable: No
- Design effort: medium
- Falsework required: Normally none

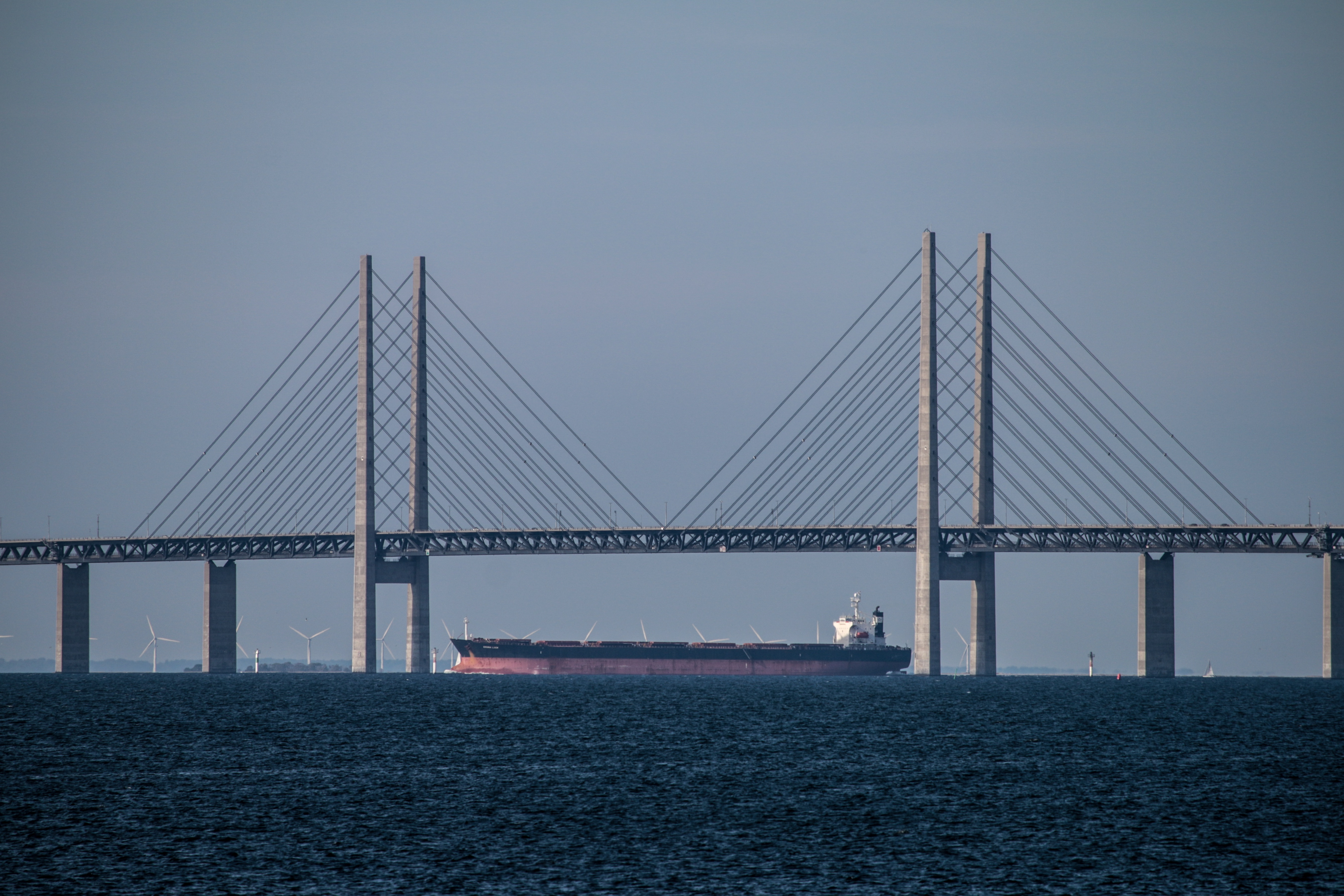
Øresund Bridge from Malmö to Copenhagen in Sweden and Denmark

A cable-stayed bridge is a type of bridge that has one or more towers (or pylons), from which cables support the bridge deck, which is like a suspension bridge. A distinctive feature is the presence of cables or stays, which run directly from the tower to the deck, normally forming a fan-like pattern or a series of parallel lines. This is in contrast to the modern suspension bridge, where the cables supporting the deck are suspended vertically from the main cables, which run between the towers and are anchored at both ends of the bridge. The cable-stayed bridge is optimal for spans longer than cantilever bridges and shorter than suspension bridges. This is the range within which cantilever bridges would rapidly grow heavier, and suspension bridge cabling would be more costly.

Cable-stayed bridges found wide use in the late 19th century. Early examples, including the Brooklyn Bridge, often combined features from both the cable-stayed and suspension designs. Cable-stayed designs fell from favor in the early 20th century as larger gaps were bridged using pure suspension designs, and shorter ones using various systems built of reinforced concrete. It returned to prominence in the later 20th century when the combination of new materials, larger construction machinery, and the need to replace older bridges all lowered the relative price of these designs.

== History ==
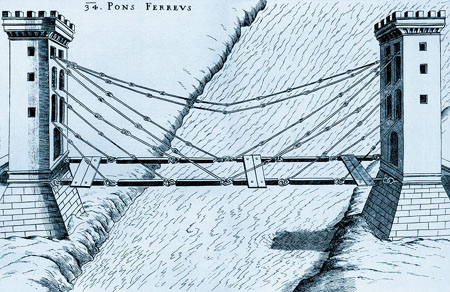
Chain-stayed bridge by the Renaissance polymath Fausto Veranzio, from 1595/1616. Prior to industrial manufacture of heavy wire rope (steel cable), suspended or stayed bridges were firstly constructed with linked rods (chain).

Cable-stayed bridges date back to 1595, where designs were found in Machinae Novae, a book by Croatian-Venetian inventor Fausto Veranzio. Many early suspension bridges were partially cable-stayed in construction, including the 1817 footbridge Dryburgh Abbey Bridge, James Dredge's patented Victoria Bridge, Bath (1836), and the later Albert Bridge (1872) and Brooklyn Bridge (1883). Their designers found that the combination of technologies created a stiffer bridge. John A. Roebling took particular advantage of this to limit deformations due to railway loads in the Niagara Falls Suspension Bridge.

The earliest known surviving example of a true cable-stayed bridge in the United States is E.E. Runyon's largely intact wrought iron Bluff Dale Suspension bridge with wooden stringers and decking in Bluff Dale, Texas (1890), or his weeks earlier but ruined Barton Creek Bridge between Huckabay, Texas and Gordon, Texas (1889 or 1890). In the twentieth century, early examples of cable-stayed bridges included A. Gisclard's unusual Cassagnes bridge (1899), in which the horizontal part of the cable forces is balanced by a separate horizontal tie cable, preventing significant compression in the deck, and G. Leinekugel le Coq's bridge at Lézardrieux in Brittany (1924). Eduardo Torroja designed a cable-stayed aqueduct at Tempul in 1926. Albert Caquot's 1952 concrete-decked cable-stayed bridge over the Donzère-Mondragon canal at Pierrelatte is one of the first of the modern type, but had little influence on later development. The steel-decked Strömsund Bridge designed by Franz Dischinger (1955) is, therefore, more often cited as the first modern cable-stayed bridge.

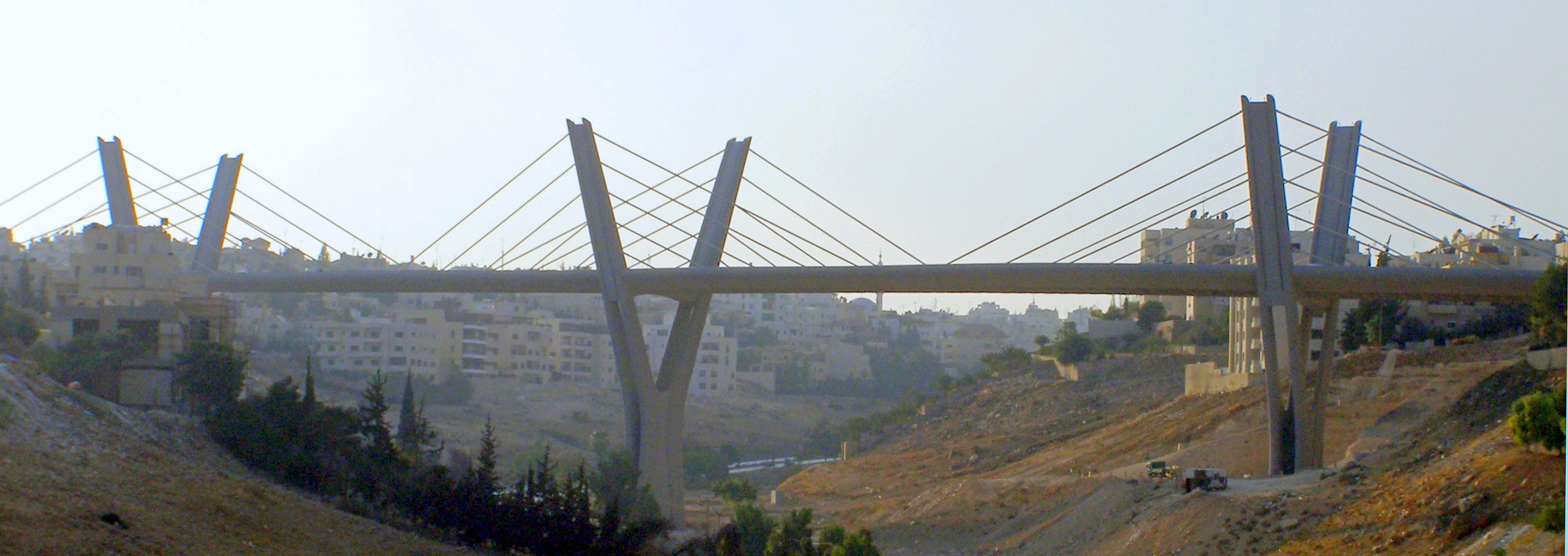
Abdoun Bridge, Amman, Jordan, example of an extradosed bridge

Other key pioneers included Fabrizio de Miranda, Riccardo Morandi, and Fritz Leonhardt. Early bridges from this period used very few stay cables, as in the Theodor Heuss Bridge (1958) and the Hawkshaw Bridge in Canada (1967). However, this involves substantial erection costs, and more modern structures tend to use many more cables to ensure greater economy.

== Comparison with suspension bridge ==
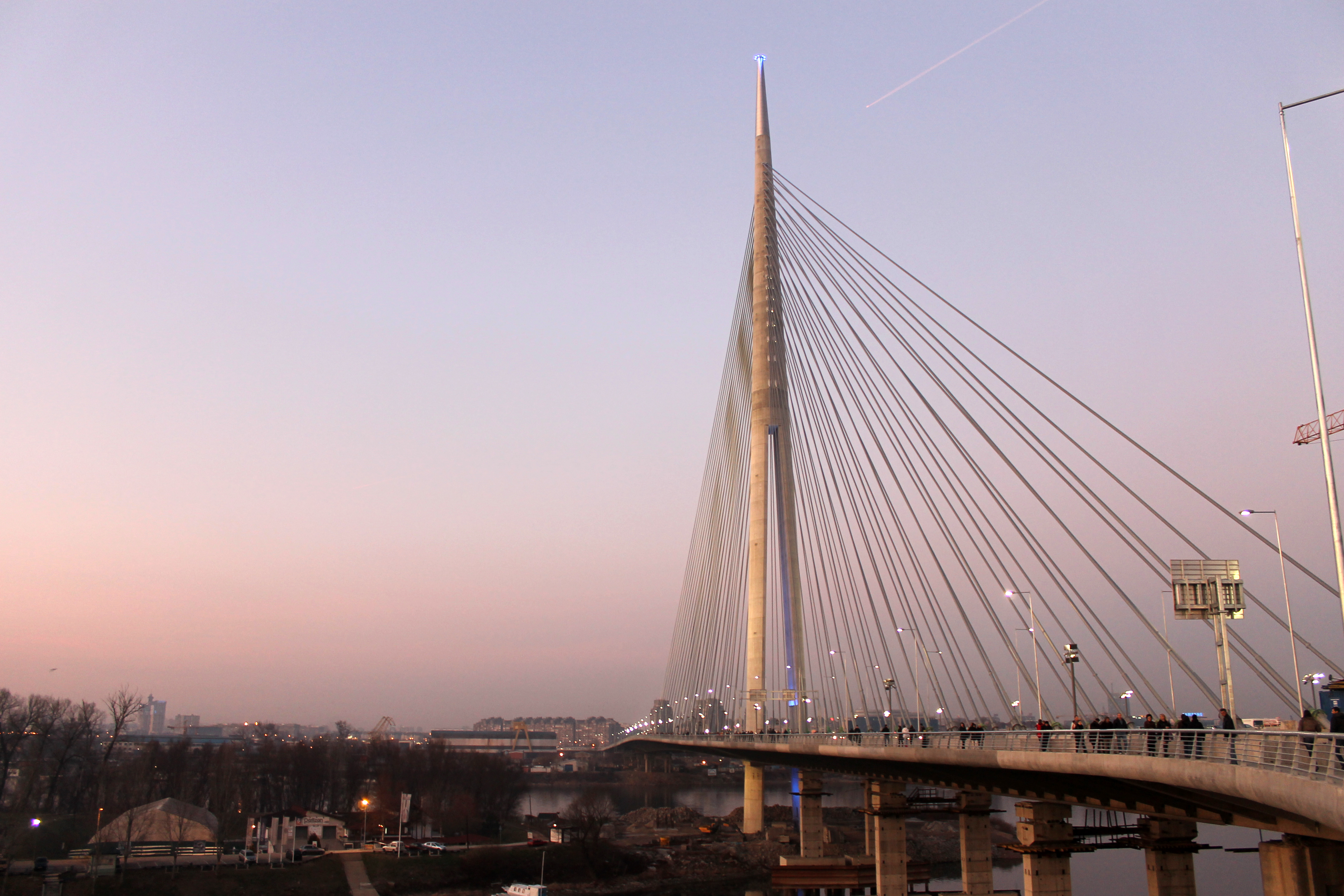
Ada Bridge at dusk in Belgrade (Serbia)

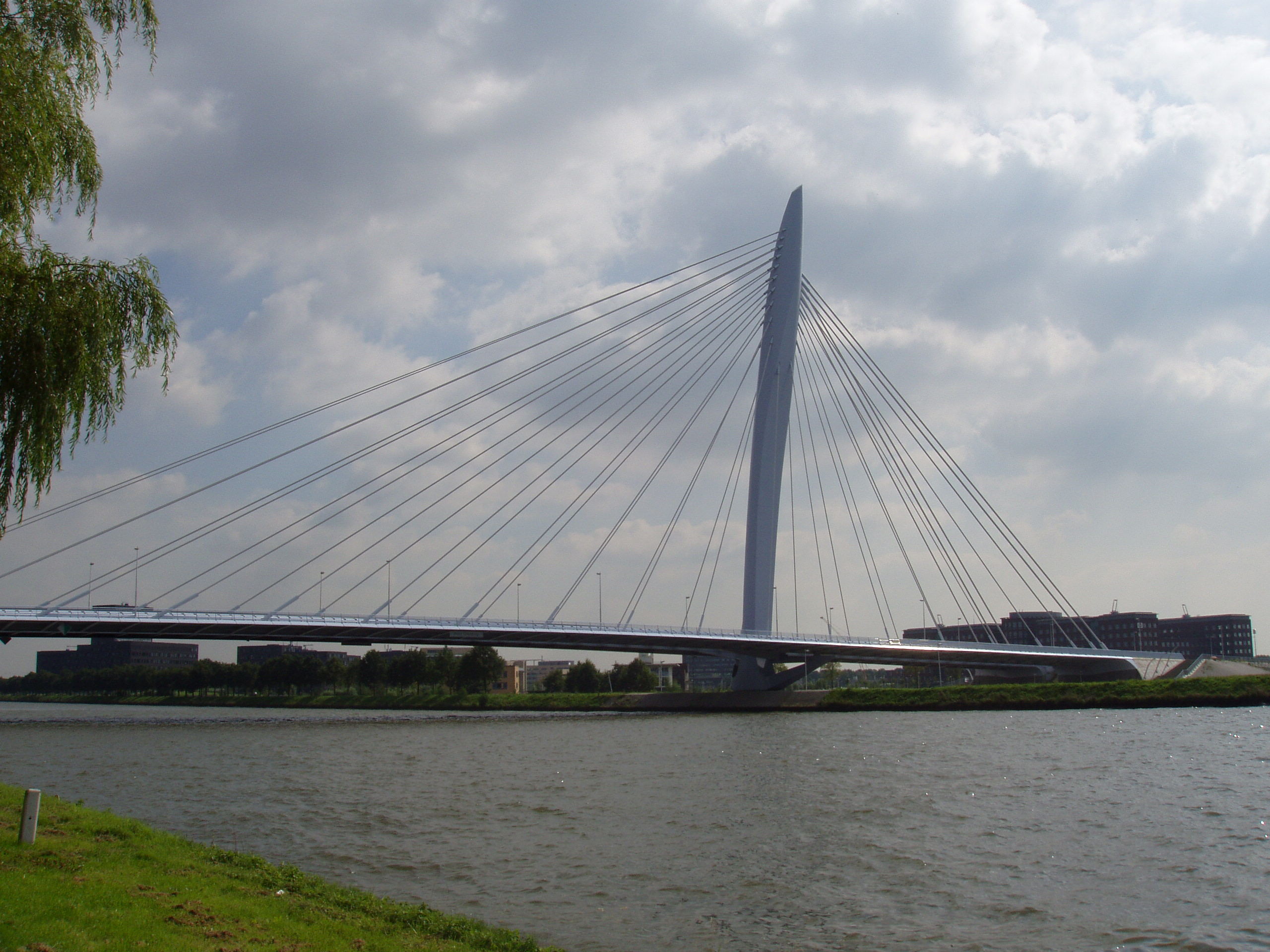
Prins Clausbrug across the Amsterdam-Rhine Canal in Utrecht

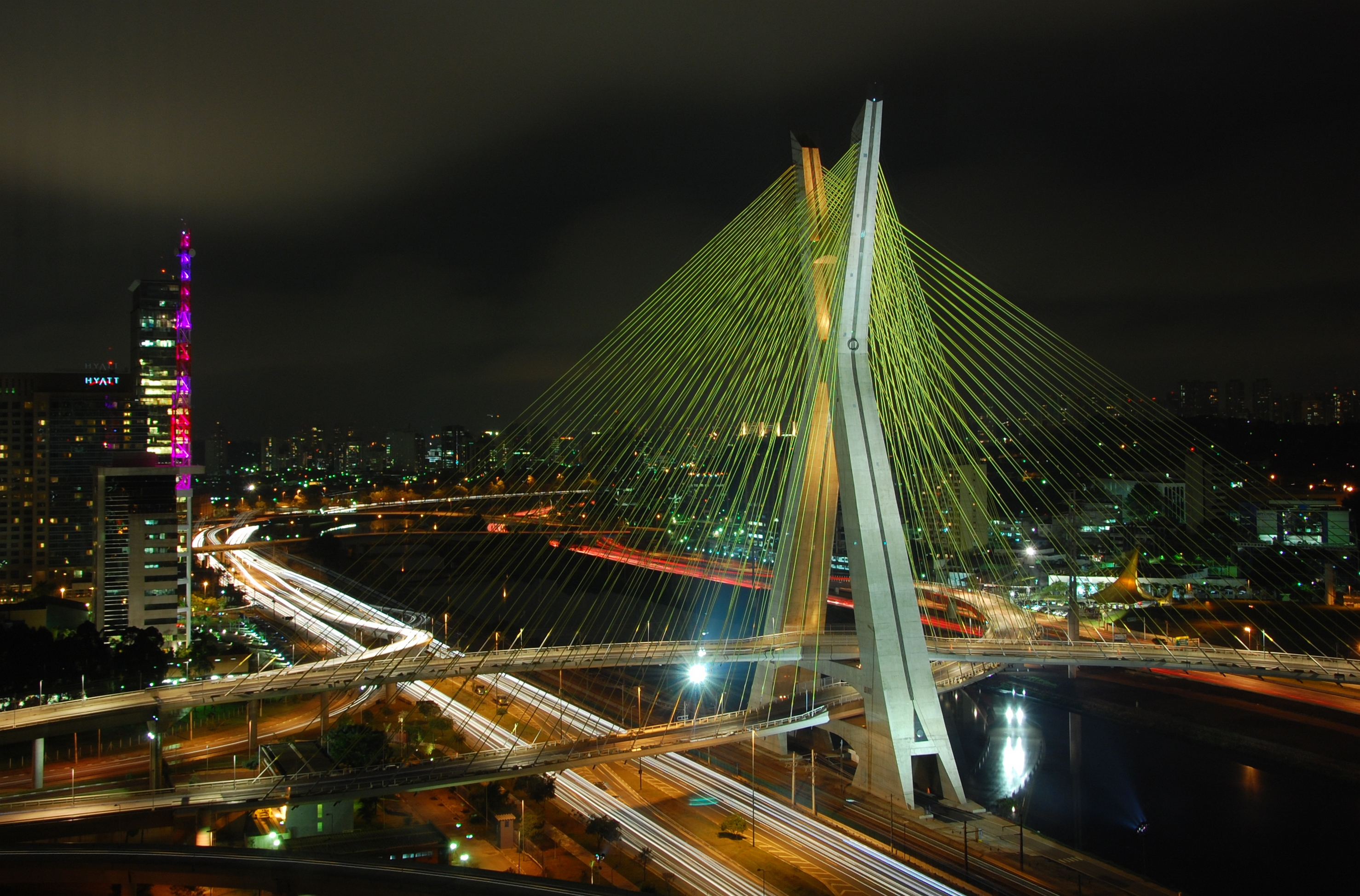
Otávio Frias Bridgestone, São Paulo, Brazil during the night

Cable-stayed bridges may appear to be similar to suspension bridges, but they are quite different in principle and construction. In suspension bridges, large main cables (normally two) hang between the towers and are anchored at each end to the ground. This can be difficult to implement when ground conditions are poor. The main cables, which are free to move on bearings in the towers, bear the load of the bridge deck. Before the deck is installed, the cables are under tension from their own weight. Along the main cables smaller cables or rods connect to the bridge deck, which is lifted in sections. As this is done, the tension in the cables increases, as it does with the live load of traffic crossing the bridge. The tension on the main cables is transferred to the ground at the anchorages and by downwards compression on the towers.

Difference between types of bridges

Suspension bridge

Cable-stayed bridge, fan design

In cable-stayed bridges, the towers are the primary load-bearing structures that transmit the bridge loads to the ground. A cantilever approach is often used to support the bridge deck near the towers, but lengths further from them are supported by cables running directly to the towers. That has the disadvantage, unlike for the suspension bridge, that the cables pull to the sides as opposed to directly up, which requires the bridge deck to be stronger to resist the resulting horizontal compression loads, but it has the advantage of not requiring firm anchorages to resist the horizontal pull of the main cables of a suspension bridge. By design, all static horizontal forces of the cable-stayed bridge are balanced so that the supporting towers do not tend to tilt or slide and so must only resist horizontal forces from the live loads.

The following are key advantages of the cable-stayed form:

- Much greater stiffness than the suspension bridge, so that deformations of the deck under live loads are reduced
- Can be constructed by cantilevering out from the tower – the cables act both as temporary and permanent supports to the bridge deck
- For a symmetrical bridge (in which the spans on either side of the tower are the same), the horizontal forces balance and large ground anchorages are not required

== Designs ==
There are four major classes of rigging on cable-stayed bridges: mono, harp, fan, and star.

- The mono design uses a single cable from its towers and is one of the lesser-used examples of the class.
- In the harp or parallel design, the cables are parallel, or nearly so, so that the height of their attachment to the tower is proportional to the distance from the tower to their mounting on the deck.
- In the fan design, the cables all connect to or pass over the top of the towers. The fan design is structurally superior with a minimum moment applied to the towers, but, for practical reasons, the modified fan (also called the semi-fan) is preferred, especially where many cables are necessary. In the modified fan arrangement, the cables terminate near the top of the tower but are spaced from each other sufficiently to allow better termination, improved environmental protection, and good access to individual cables for maintenance.
- In the star design, another relatively rare design, the cables are spaced apart on the tower, like the harp design, but connect to one point or a number of closely spaced points on the deck.
Difference between types of bridges

mono design

harp design

fan design

star design

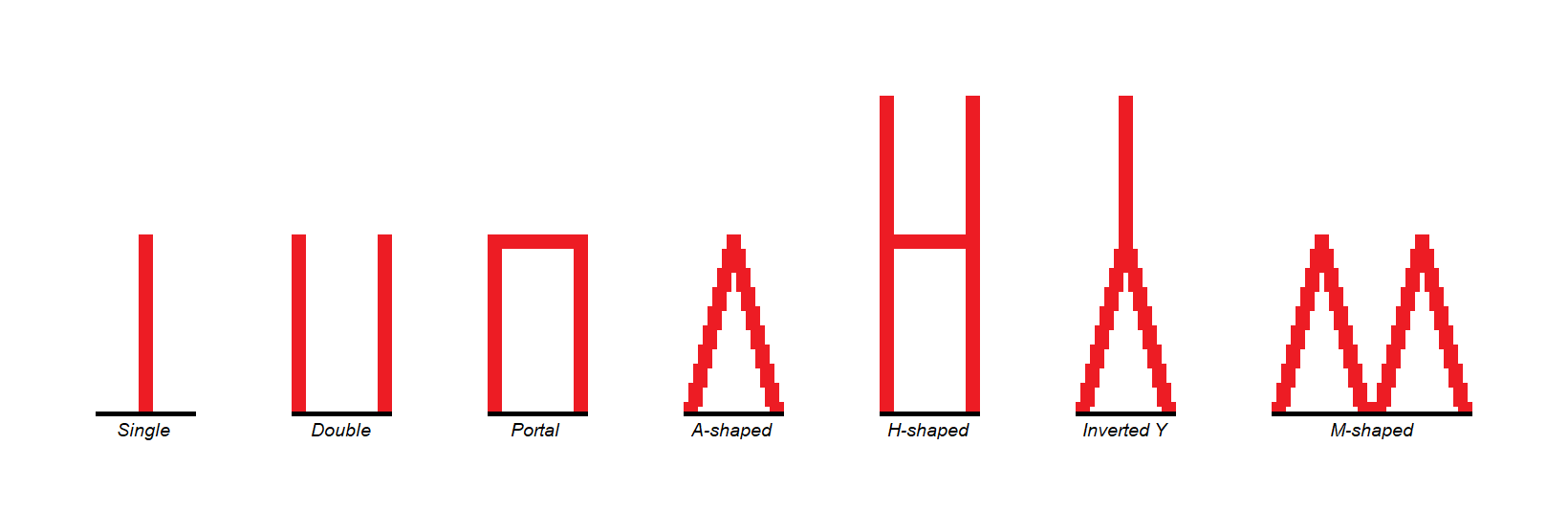
All seven column arrangements of a cable-stayed bridge

There are also seven main arrangements for support columns: single, double, portal, A-shaped, H-shaped, inverted Y, and M-shaped. The last three are hybrid arrangements that combine two arrangements into one.

- The single arrangement uses a single column for cable support, normally projecting through the center of the deck, but in some cases located on one side or the other. Examples: Millau Viaduct in France and Sunshine Skyway Bridge in Florida.
- The double arrangement places pairs of columns on both sides of the deck. Examples: Øresund Bridge between Denmark and Sweden, and Zolotoy Bridge in Russia.
- The portal is similar to the double arrangement but has a third member connecting the tops of the two columns to form a door-like shape or portal. This offers additional strength, especially against transverse loads. Examples: Hale Boggs Bridge in Louisiana and Kirumi Bridge in Tanzania.
- The A-shaped design is similar in concept to the portal but achieves the same goal by angling the two columns towards each other to meet at the top, eliminating the need for the third member. Examples: Arthur Ravenel Jr. Bridge in South Carolina, Helgeland Bridge in Norway, and Christopher S. Bond Bridge in Missouri.
- The H-shaped design combines the portal on the bottom with the double on top. Examples: Grenland Bridge in Norway, Vasco da Gama Bridge in Portugal, Greenville Bridge in Arkansas, and John James Audubon Bridge in Louisiana.
- The inverted Y design combines the A-shaped on the bottom with the single on top. Examples: Pont de Normandie in France and Incheon Bridge in South Korea.
- The M-shaped design combines two A-shaped arrangements, side by side, to form an M. This arrangement is rare, and is mostly used in wide bridges where a single A-shaped arrangement would be too weak. Examples: Fred Hartman Bridge in Texas, and its planned sister bridge Ship Channel Bridge, also in Texas.

Depending on the design, the columns may be vertical, angled relative to vertical, or curved.

== Variations ==
=== Side-spar cable-stayed bridge ===
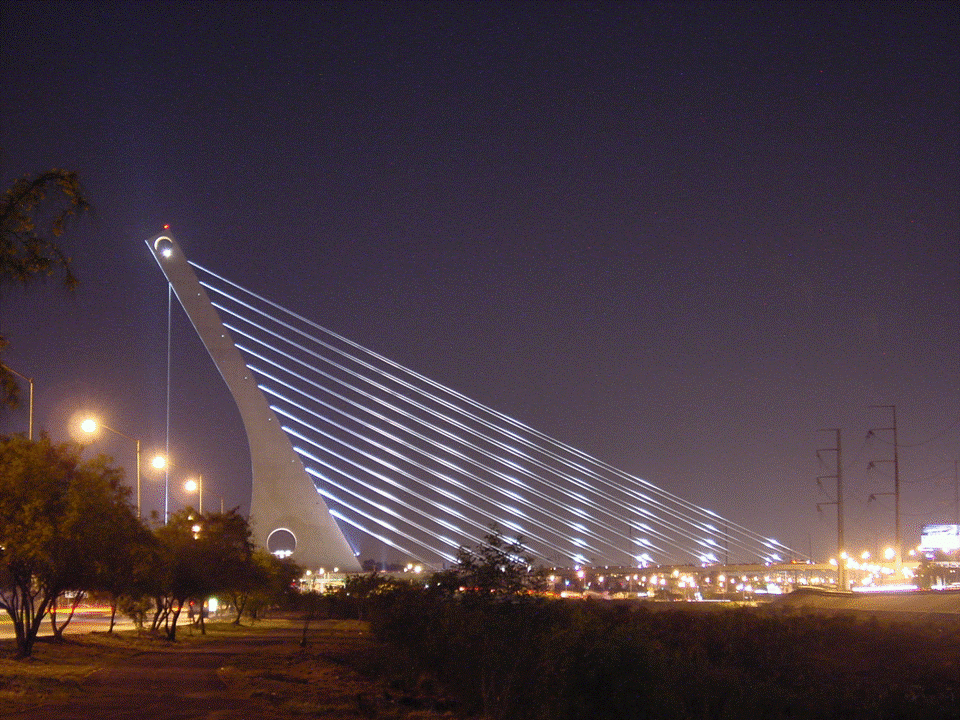
Puente de la Unidad, joining San Pedro Garza García and Monterrey, a Cantilever spar cable-stayed bridge

A side-spar cable-stayed bridge uses a central tower supported only on one side. This design allows the construction of a curved bridge.

=== Cantilever spar cable-stayed bridge ===
Far more radical in its structure, the Puente del Alamillo (1992) uses a single cantilever spar on one side of a single span, with cables on one side only to support the bridge deck. Unlike other cable-stayed types, this bridge exerts considerable overturning force upon its foundation, and the spar must resist bending caused by the cables, as the cable forces are not balanced by opposing cables. The spar of this particular bridge forms the gnomon of a large garden sundial. Related bridges by the architect Santiago Calatrava include the Puente de la Mujer (2001), Sundial Bridge (2004), Chords Bridge (2008), and Assut de l'Or Bridge (2008).

=== Multiple-span cable-stayed bridge ===
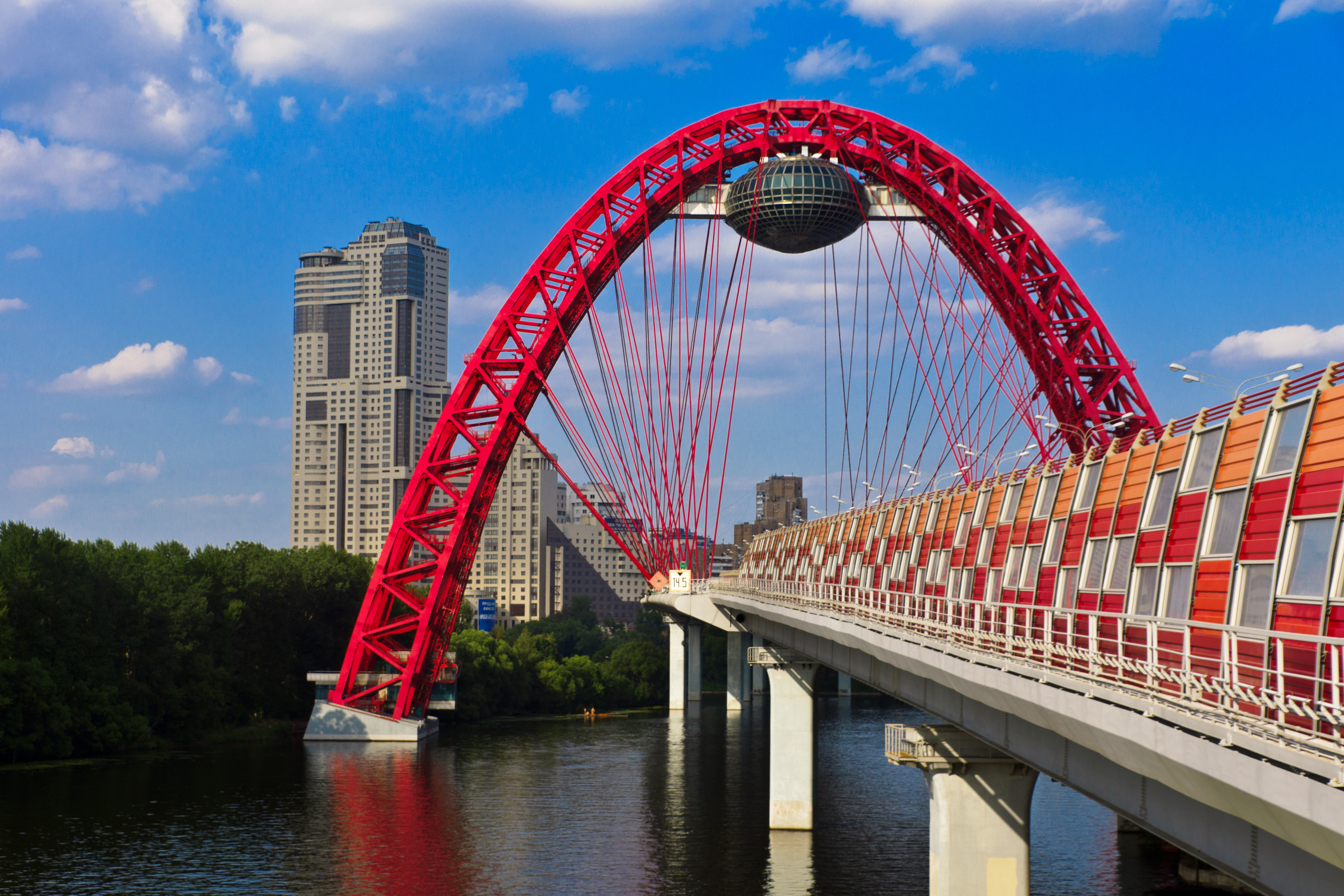
Zhivopisny Bridge in Moscow is a multiple-span design.

Cable-stayed bridges with more than three spans involve significantly more challenging designs than do two-span or three-span structures.

In a two-span or three-span cable-stayed bridge, the loads from the main spans are normally anchored near the end abutments by stays in the end spans. For more spans, this is not the case, and the bridge structure is less stiff overall. This can create difficulties in both the design of the deck and the pylons. Examples of multiple-span structures in which this is the case include Ting Kau Bridge, where additional 'cross-bracing' stays are used to stabilise the pylons; Millau Viaduct, where twin-legged towers are used; and General Rafael Urdaneta Bridge, where very stiff multi-legged frame towers were adopted. A similar situation with a suspension bridge is found at both the Great Seto Bridge and San Francisco–Oakland Bay Bridge, where additional anchorage piers are required after every set of three suspension spans – this solution can also be adapted for cable-stayed bridges.

=== Extradosed bridge ===
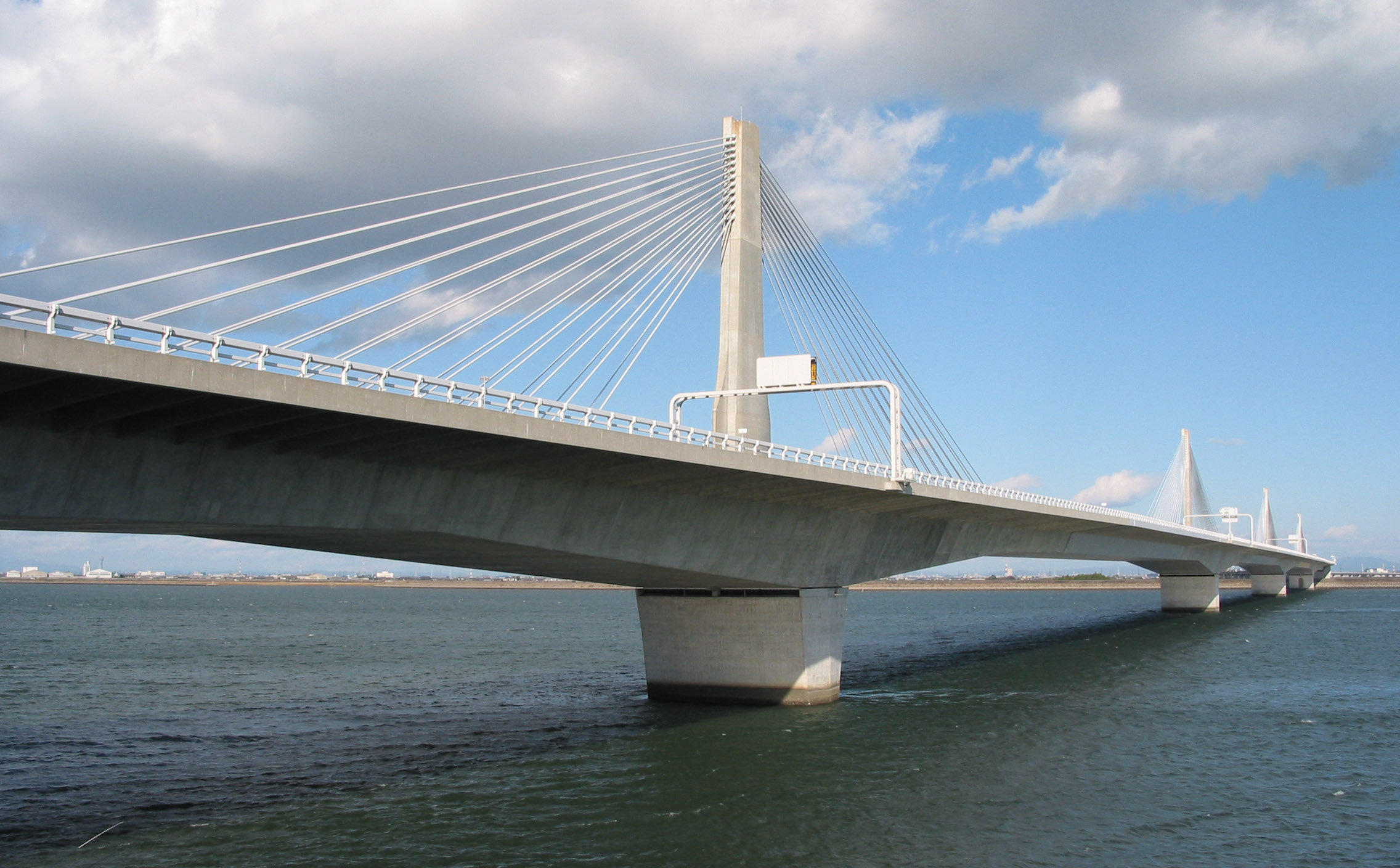
The Twinkle-Kisogawa is an extradosed design, with long gaps between the cable supported sections.

An extradosed bridge is a cable-stayed bridge with a more substantial bridge deck that, being stiffer and stronger, allows the cables to be omitted close to the tower and for the towers to be lower in proportion to the span. The first extradosed bridges were the Ganter Bridge and Sunniberg Bridge in Switzerland. The first extradosed bridge in the United States, the Pearl Harbor Memorial Bridge was built to carry I-95 across the Quinnipiac River in New Haven, Connecticut, opening in June 2012.

=== Cable-stayed cradle-system bridge ===
A cradle system carries the strands within the stays from the bridge deck to bridge deck, as a continuous element, eliminating anchorages in the pylons. Each epoxy-coated steel strand is carried inside the cradle in a one-inch (2.54 cm) steel tube. Each strand acts independently, allowing for removal, inspection, and replacement of individual strands. The first two such bridges are the Penobscot Narrows Bridge, completed in 2006, and the Veterans' Glass City Skyway, completed in 2007.

== Related bridge types ==
=== Self-anchored suspension bridge ===
A self-anchored suspension bridge has some similarity in principle to the cable-stayed type in that tension forces that prevent the deck from dropping are converted into compression forces vertically in the tower and horizontally along the deck structure. It is also related to the suspension bridge in having arcuate main cables with suspender cables, although the self-anchored type lacks the heavy cable anchorages of the ordinary suspension bridge. Unlike either a cable-stayed bridge or a suspension bridge, the self-anchored suspension bridge must be supported by falsework during construction and so it is more expensive to construct.

== Notable cable-stayed bridges ==
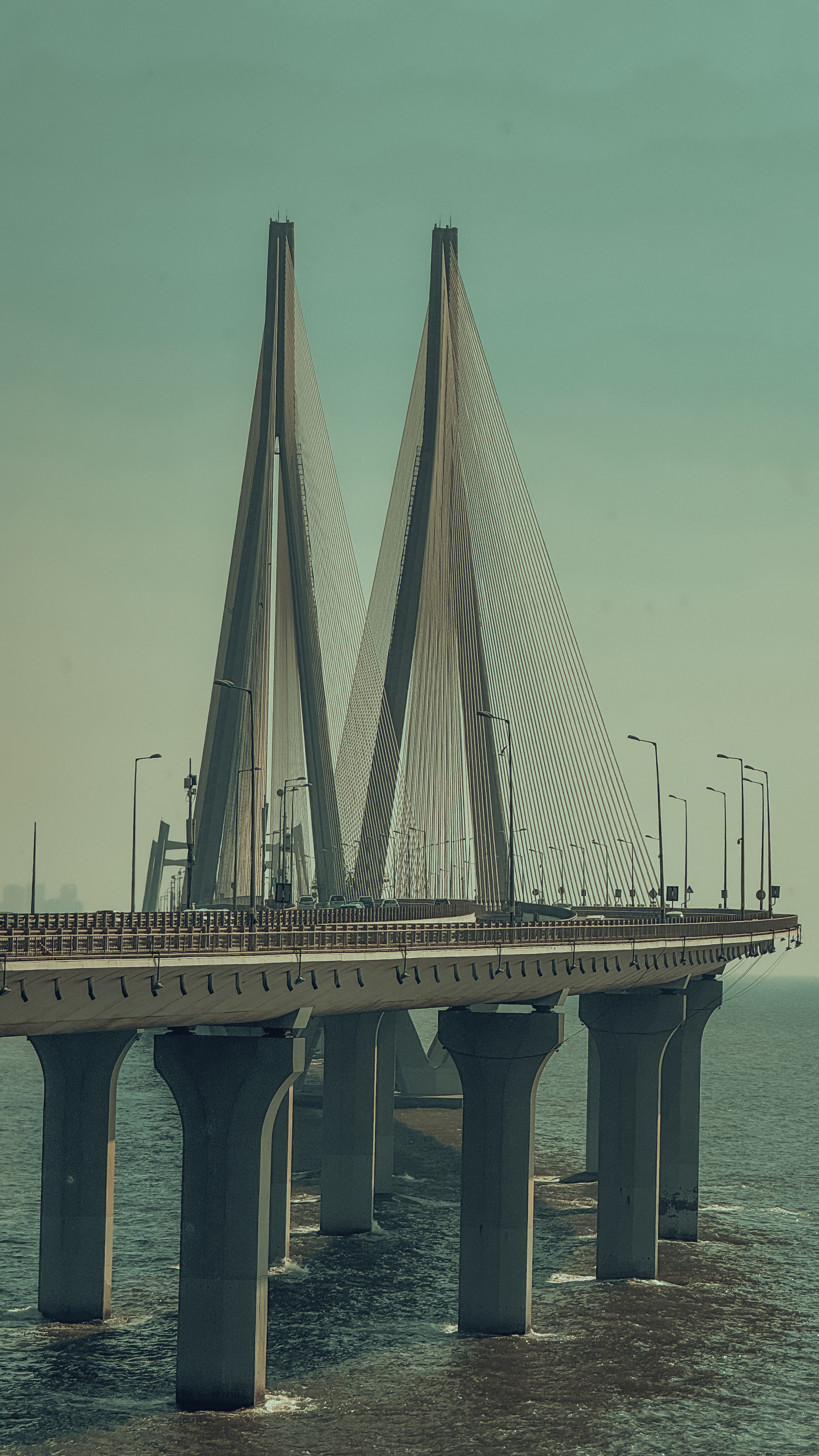
Bandra Sealink in Mumbai

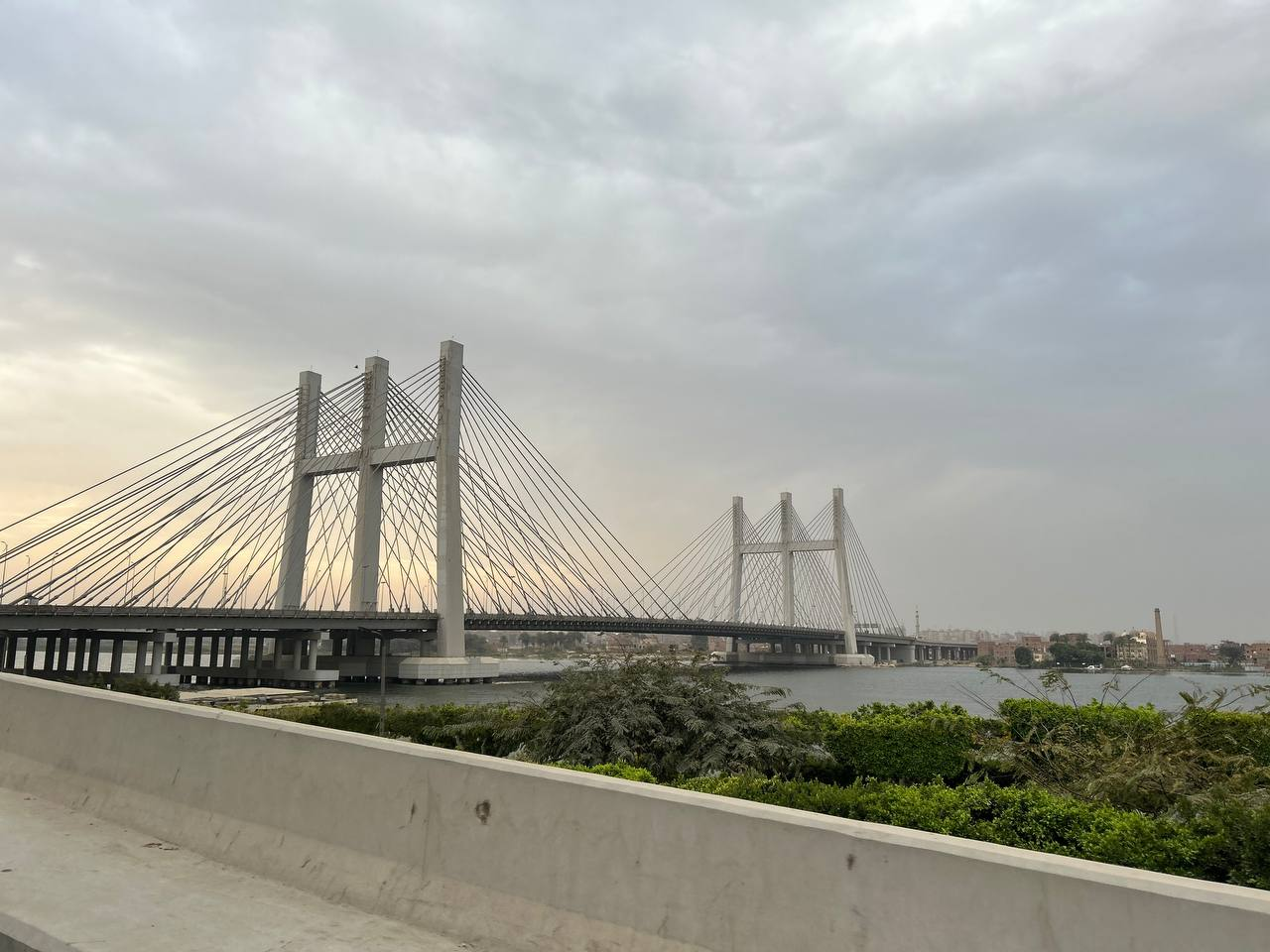
Rod El Farag Axis Bridge, the world's widest cable-stayed bridge.

- Arthur Ravenel Jr. Bridge, crosses the Cooper River in Charleston, South Carolina. It opened in 2005 to replace the John P. Grace Memorial Bridge and the Silas N. Pearman Bridge which were nearing the end of their useful lives. At the time of its opening it was the longest cable-stayed bridge span in the Western Hemisphere.
- Aswan Bridge, crossing over the Nile river, located in the city of Aswan, Egypt. It was built by the Holding Company for Roads, Bridges and Land Transport Projects.
- Bandra-Worli Sealink - Cable stayed Bridge in Mumbai (also known as Bombay).
- Brooklyn Bridge, famous as a suspension bridge, also has cable stays.
- Centennial Bridge, a six-lane vehicular bridge that crosses the Panama Canal with a total length of 1.05 kilometres (3,400 ft).

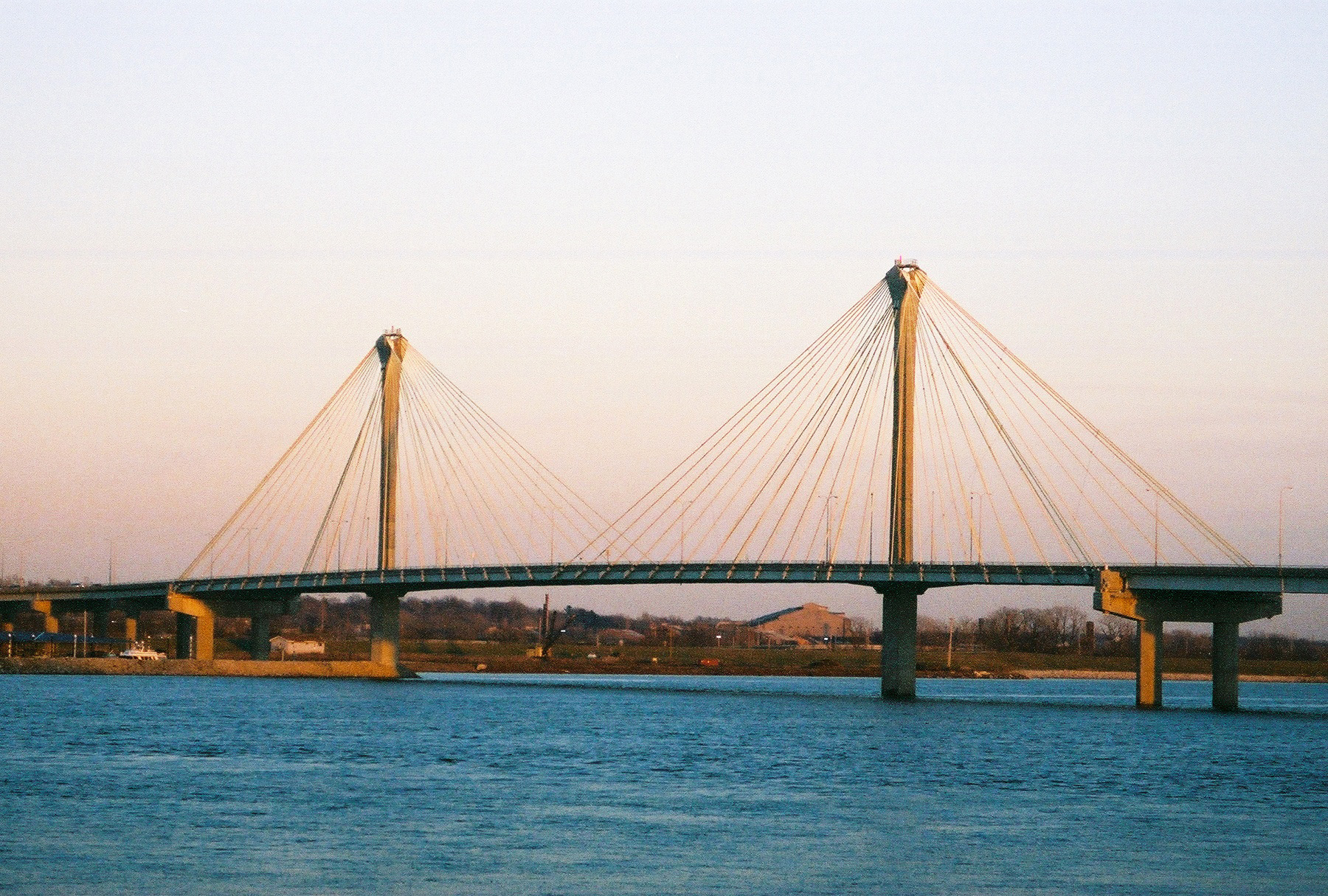
A view of the Clark Bridge from West Alton, Missouri

- Changtai Yangtze River Bridge, connecting the cities of Changzhou and Taizhou across the Yangtze River in China, opened in 2025. It has the world's longest span, at 1,208 metres (3,963 ft) meters
- Clark Bridge, named after explorer William Clark, carries U.S. 67 between Illinois and Missouri. Opened in 1994, the 108-foot-wide bridge (33 m) replaced the old Clark Bridge, a truss bridge built in 1928 which was only 20 feet (6.1 m) wide. The bridge is sometimes referred to as the Super Bridge as its construction process was documented in the 1997 NOVA episode Super Bridge, which highlighted the challenges of building the bridge, especially during the Great Flood of 1993. Total length is 4,620 feet (1,408 m) with a longest span of 756 feet (230 m).

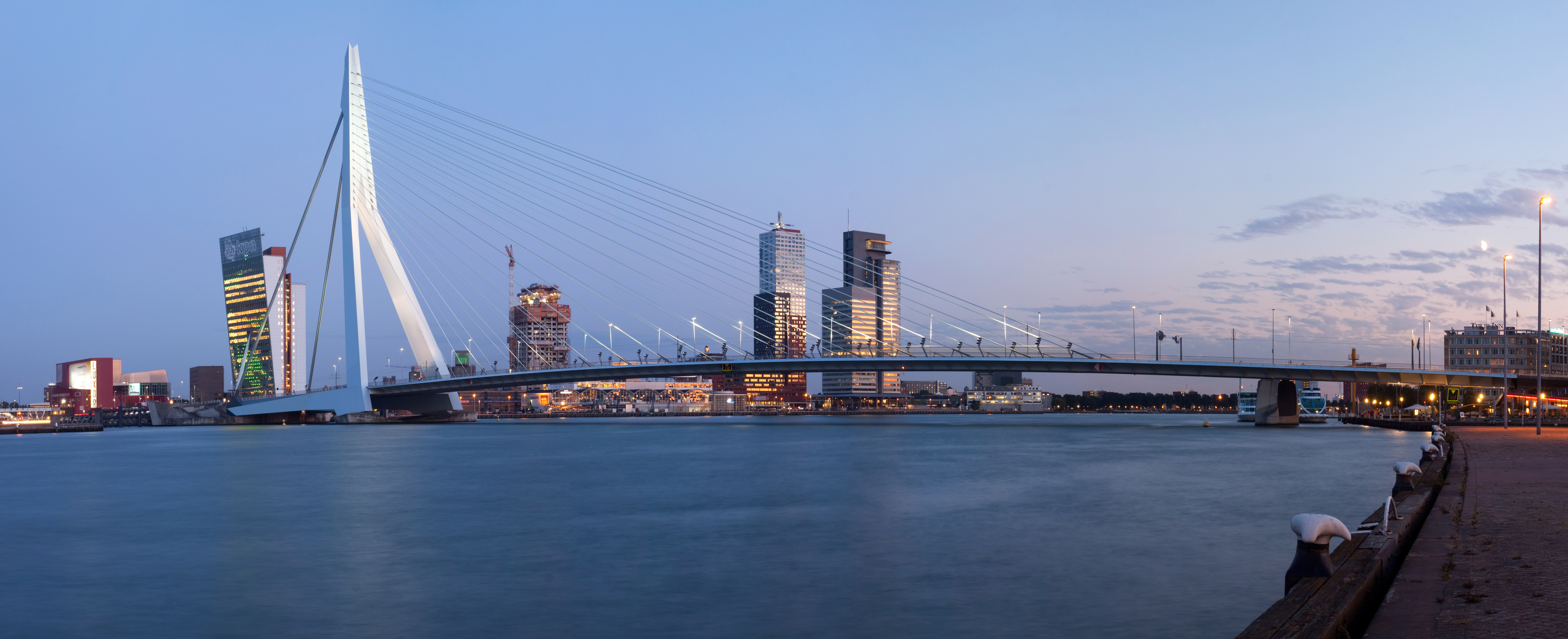
Erasmus Bridge, Erasmusbrug, in Rotterdam, Netherlands

- Erasmus Bridge crosses the Nieuwe Maas in Rotterdam, Netherlands. The southern span of the bridge has an 89 metres (292 ft) bascule bridge for ships that cannot pass under the bridge. The bascule bridge is the largest and heaviest in West Europe and has the largest panel of its type in the world.

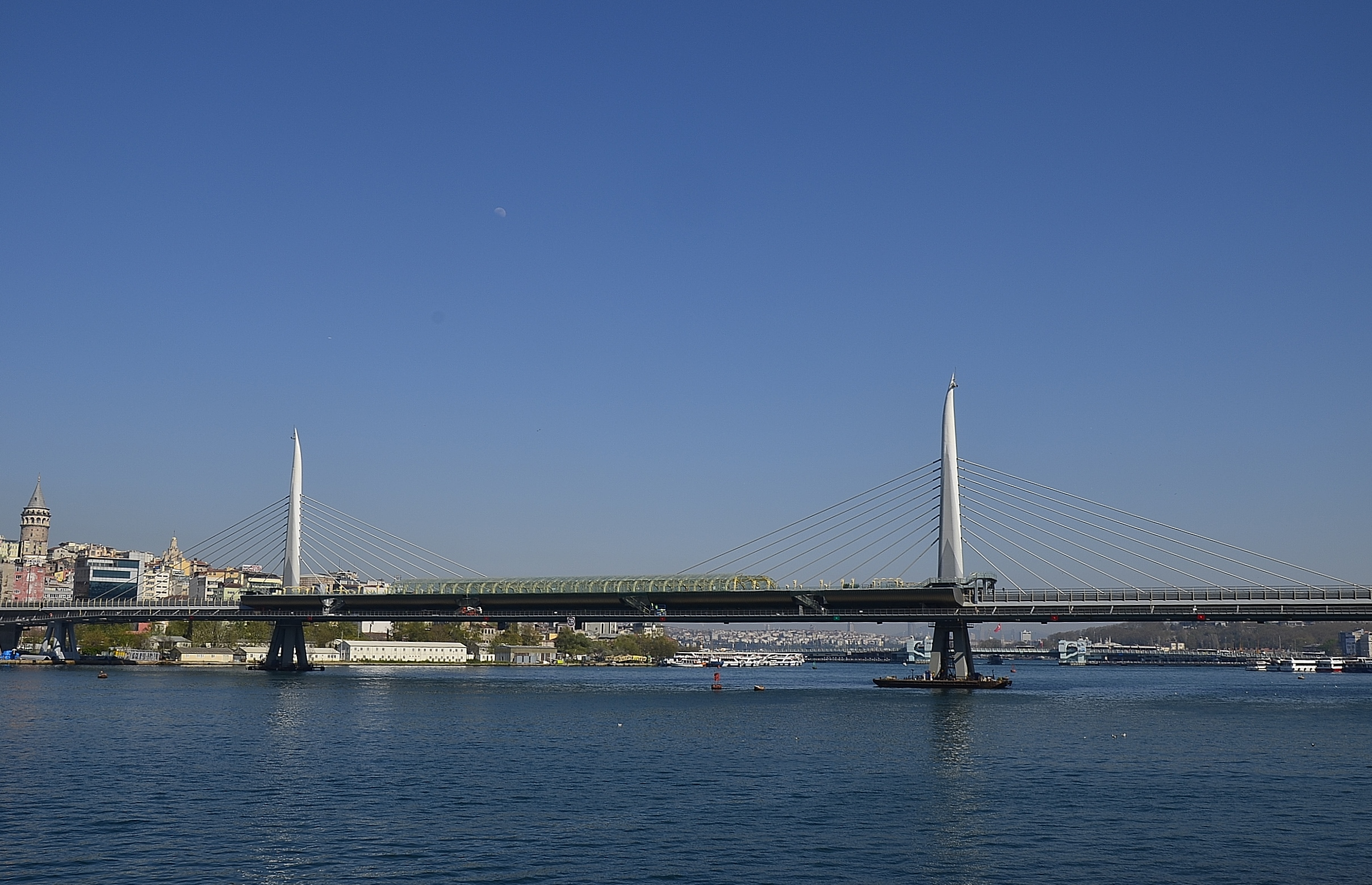
A view of the Golden Horn Metro Bridge, with the Galata Tower at the left end of the frame, Istanbul, Turkey

- Golden Horn Metro Bridge, connects the old peninsula of Istanbul with the Galata district and is the first cable-stayed bridge in Turkey.
- The Gordie Howe International Bridge connects Detroit, Michigan with Windsor, Ontario, having two inverted "Y" shaped towers built on the banks of the Detroit River, six lanes for automotive traffic, and a cycle and walking path. It is 2.5 kilometres (1.6 miles) long. Opened in 2026, it has the longest main span of any cable-stayed bridge in the Western Hemisphere at 853 metres (2,799 feet).
- Jiaxing-Shaoxing Sea Bridge, Zhejiang Province, China. The bridge is an eight-lane structure that spans 10,100 metres (6.3 mi) across Hangzhou Bay, connecting Jiaxing and Shaoxing, two cities of Zhejiang province. It was opened on 23 July 2013 and is currently the longest cable-stayed bridge in the world.
- John James Audubon Bridge (Mississippi River): The longest cable-stayed bridge in the Western Hemisphere, crossing the Mississippi River between New Roads, Louisiana and St. Francisville, Louisiana.
- Journalist Phelippe Daou Bridge crosses the Rio Negro in Amazonas state. It was opened on 24 October 2011 and is currently the fourth longest bridge in Brazil, at 3,595 metres (11,795 ft) with a cable-stayed span of 400 metres (1,300 feet).
- Kap Shui Mun Bridge: Road-rail cable-stayed bridge with longest span when opened
- Kosciuszko Bridge: This connects the boroughs of Brooklyn and Queens in New York City, replacing a truss bridge of the same name. The first cable-stayed span (temporarily carrying three lanes in each direction) opened to traffic in April 2017. A second, nearly identical span opened on 29 August 2019.

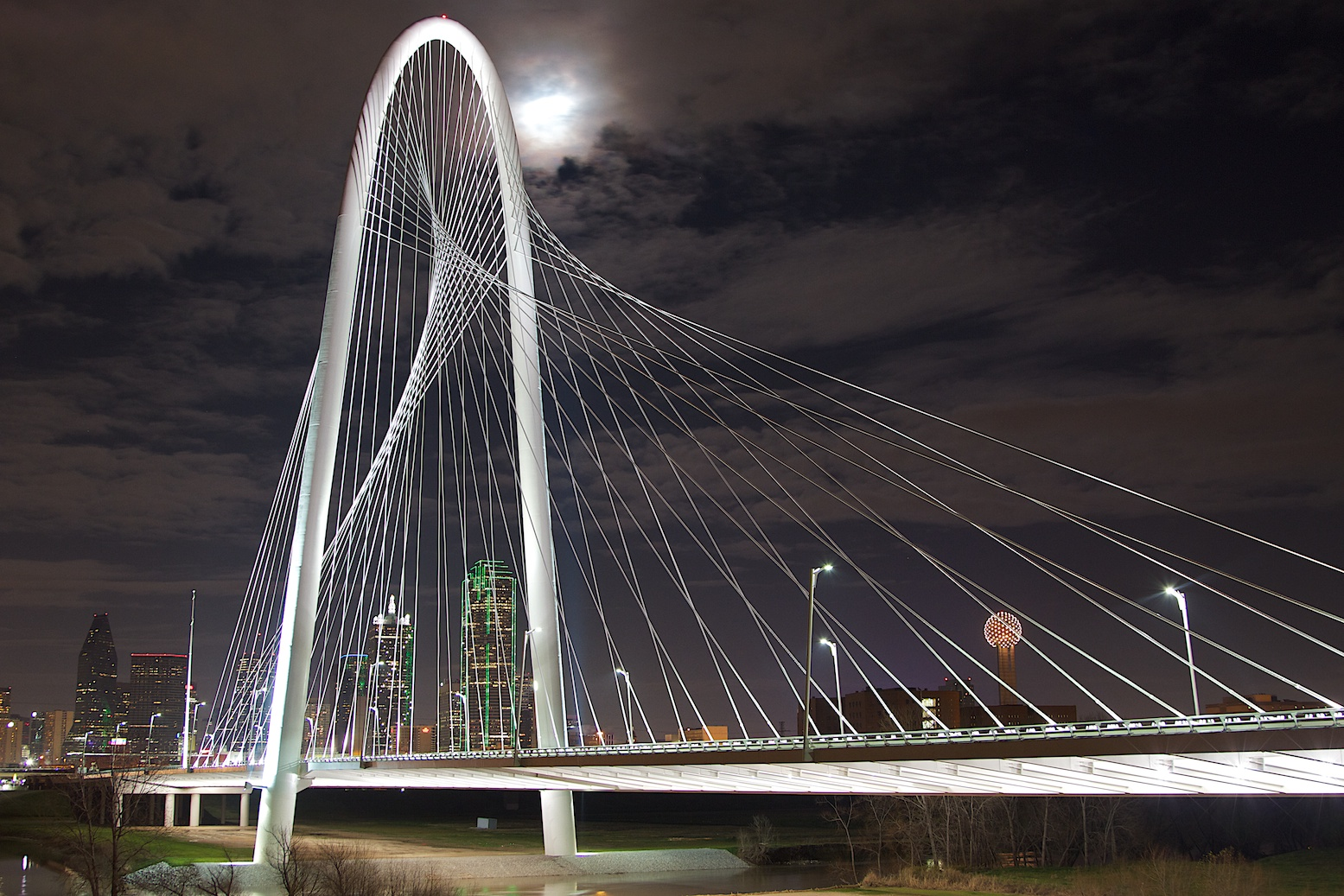
Margaret Hunt Hill Bridge over the Trinity River in Dallas, Texas, U.S. (2012)

- Margaret Hunt Hill Bridge in Dallas, Texas, U.S., which opened in 2012 and spans the Trinity River. In 2012, the bridge received an Outstanding Civil Engineering Achievement Award from the Texas section of the American Society of Civil Engineers. The bridge also received a 2012 European Convention for Constructional Steelwork Award For Steel Bridges.
- Millau Viaduct, the bridge with the tallest piers in the world: 341 metres (1,119 ft) tall and roadway 266 metres (873 ft) high, spanning the river Tarn in France. With a total length of 2,460 metres (8,070 ft) and seven towers, it also has the longest cable-stayed suspended deck in the world.

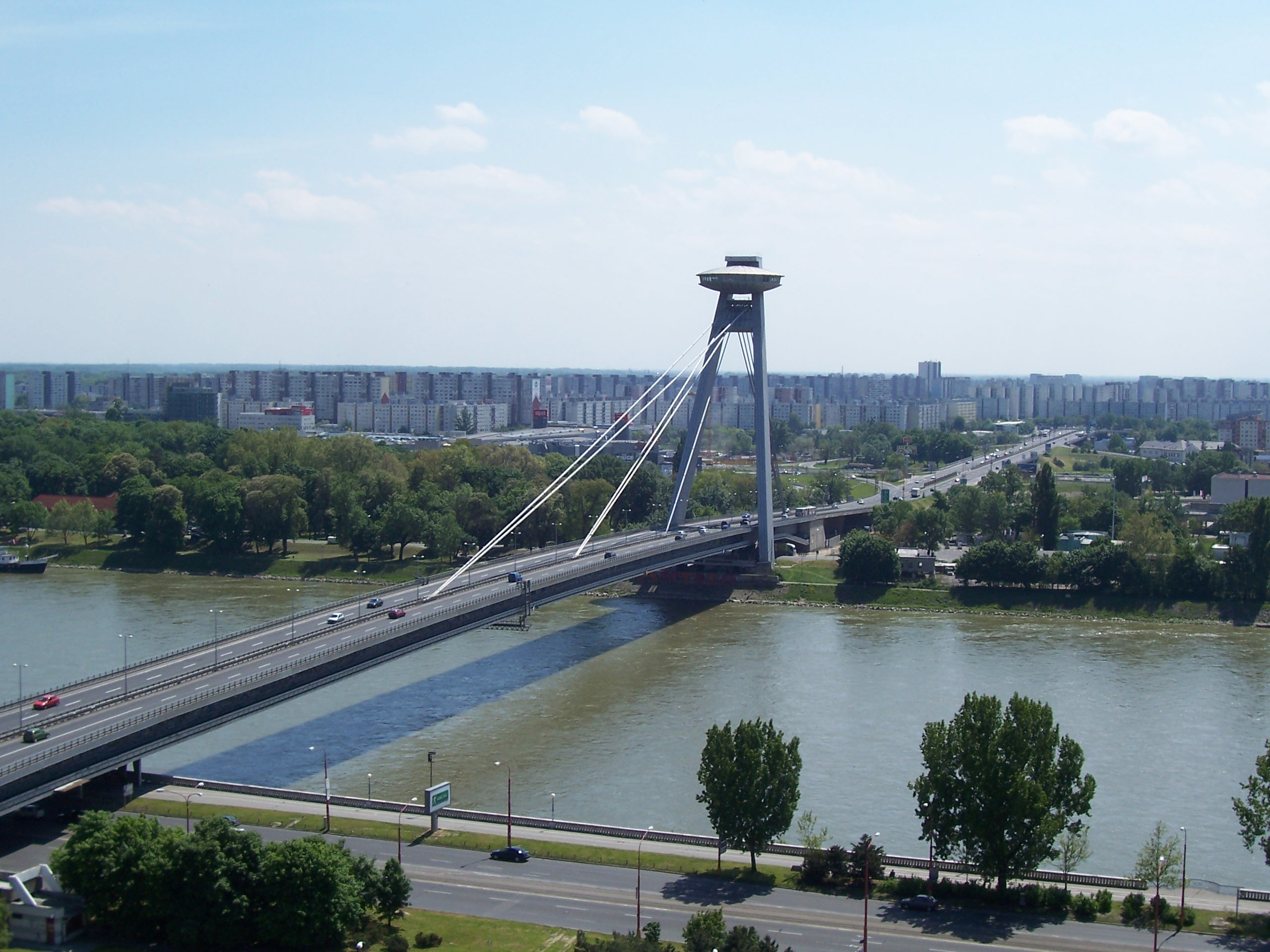
Most SNP (Bridge of the Slovak National Uprising) – the world's longest cable-stayed bridge to have one pylon and one cable-stayed plane (Bratislava, Slovakia, 1967–1972)

- Most SNP (Nový most), the world's longest cable-stayed bridge in category with one pylon and with one cable-stayed plane, spanning the Danube in Bratislava, Slovakia. The main span is 303 metres (994 ft), total length 430.8 metres (1,413 ft). The only member of World Federation of Great Towers that is primarily used as a bridge. It houses a flying-saucer restaurant at the top of pylon 85 metres (279 ft) tall.
- Octavio Frias de Oliveira bridge crosses the Pinheiros River in São Paulo, 2008. It has a 138 metres (453 ft)-high pylon under which two stayed roads cross each other turning 90° to the opposite bank of the river.
- Oresund Bridge, a combined two-track rail and four-lane road bridge with a main span of 490 metres (1,610 ft) and a total length of 7.85 kilometres (4.88 mi), crossing the Öresund between Malmö, Sweden, and the Danish Capital Region.

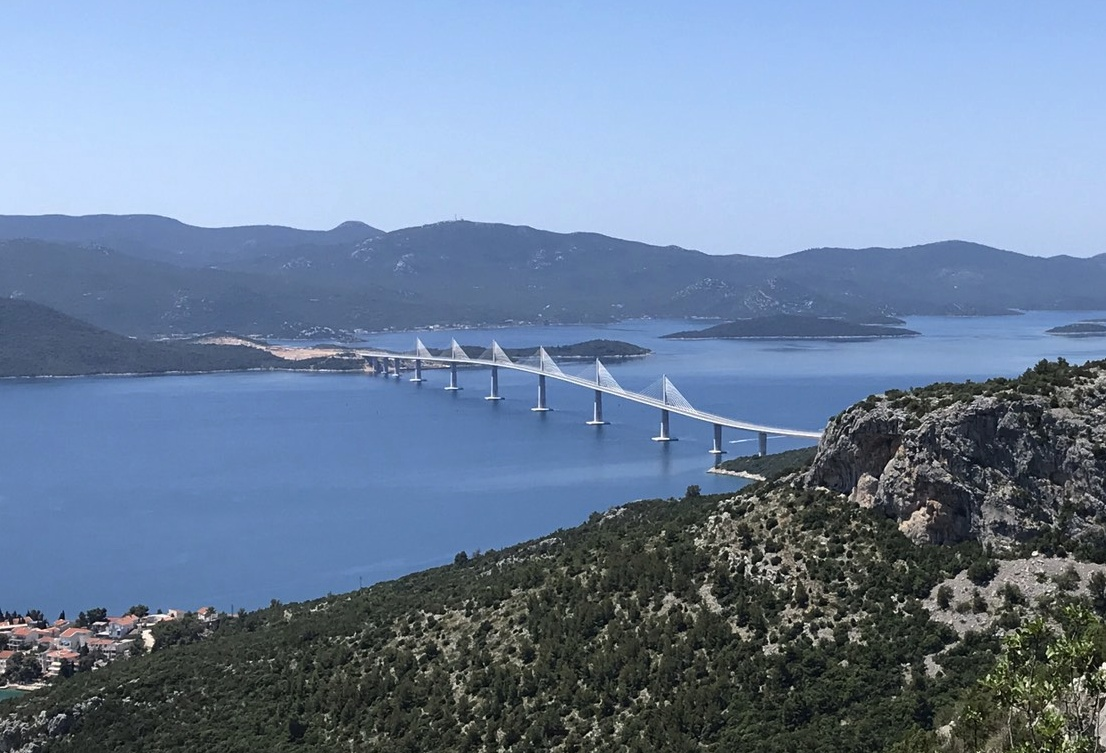
Pelješac Bridge connects the southeastern Croatian exclave to the rest of the country.

- Pelješac Bridge, Dubrovnik-Neretva County, Croatia. It is a 2,404 metres (7,887 ft) long and 98 metres (322 ft) tall road bridge that connects the southeastern semi-exclave to the rest of the country, spanning the sea channel between Komarna and Pelješac.
- Penobscot Narrows Bridge and Observatory, a road bridge with an observatory at the top of one of the towers, and a span of 2,120 feet (646 m).
- Ponte Morandi, part of which collapsed during a rainstorm on 14 August 2018
- Pont de Normandie, crosses the Seine in Normandy, France (1988–1995) – briefly the world's longest cable-stayed bridge.
- Queensferry Crossing (formerly the Forth Replacement Crossing) is a road bridge in Scotland. It is built alongside the existing, suspension, Forth Road Bridge across the Firth of Forth and upon completion in 2017 became the longest triple-tower cable-stayed bridge in the world at 2700m.
- Pont de Brotonne, first modern cable-stayed bridge of that type, opened to traffic in 1977.
- Rande Bridge in Spain near Vigo is the highway cable-stayed bridge with the longest and slenderest span in the world at the time of construction (1973–1977). Three long spans of 148 metres (486 ft) + 400 metres (1,300 ft) + 148 metres (486 ft). Pylons in concrete, girder in steel.
- Rio-Antirio Bridge crosses the Gulf of Corinth near Patras, Greece. At a total length of 2,880 metres (9,450 ft) and four towers, it has the second longest cable-stayed suspended deck (2,258 metres (7,408 ft) long) in the world, with only the deck of the Millau Viaduct in southern France being longer at 2,460 metres (8,070 ft). However, as the latter is also supported by bearings at the pylons apart from cable stays, the Rio–Antirrio bridge deck might be considered the longest cable-stayed fully suspended deck in the world.

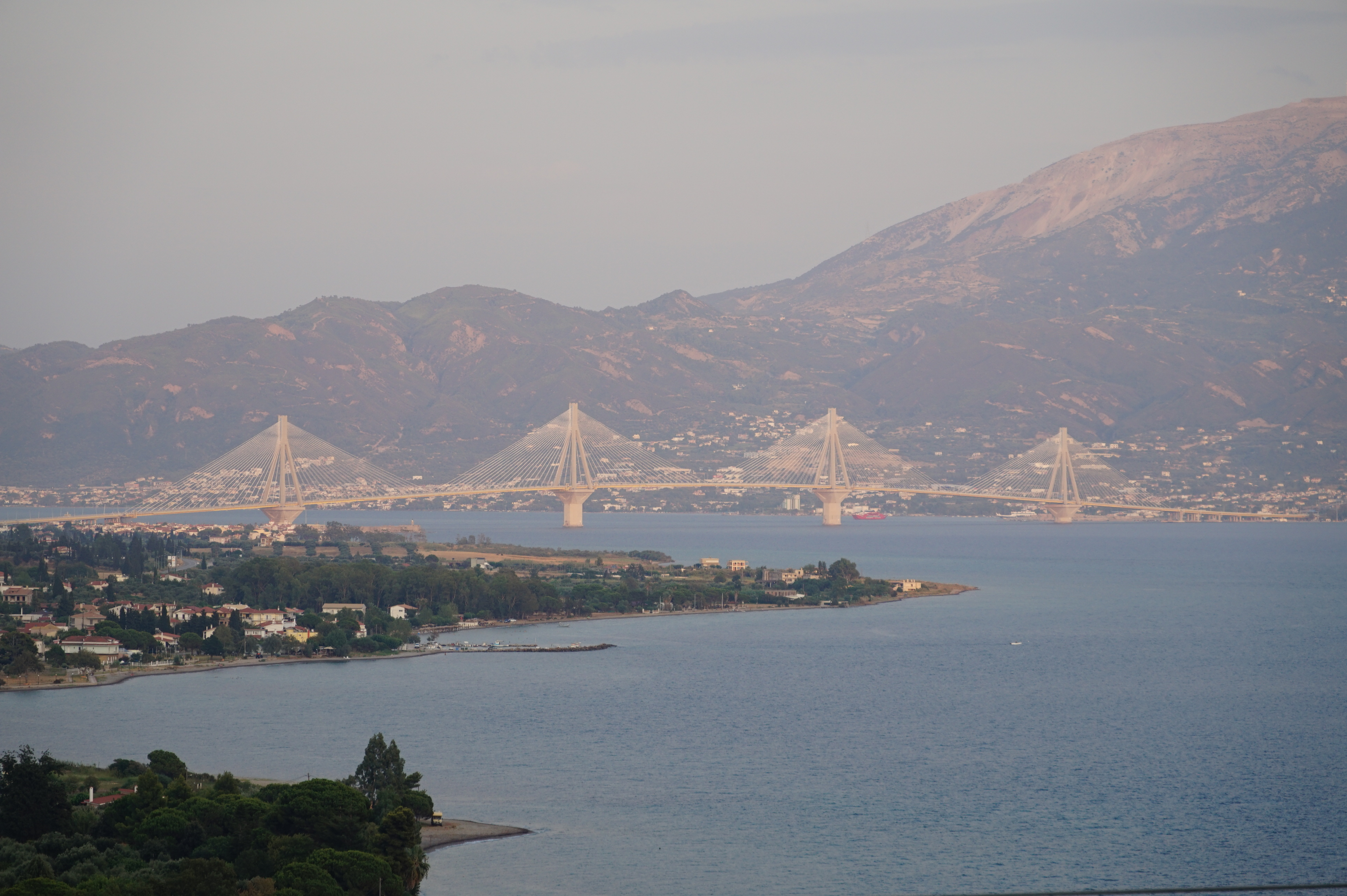
Rio–Antirrio Bridge that crosses the Gulf of Corinth near Patras, linking the town of Rio on the Peloponnese peninsula to Antirrio on mainland Greece by road.

- Rod El Farag Axis Bridge, crosses the Nile River in Cairo, Egypt. With a width of 67.3 meters, the bridge holds the Guinness World Record for the world's widest cable-stayed bridge.
- Russky Bridge, the cable-stayed bridge with the world's second longest span, at 1,104 metres (3,622 ft) meters. Vladivostok, Russia.

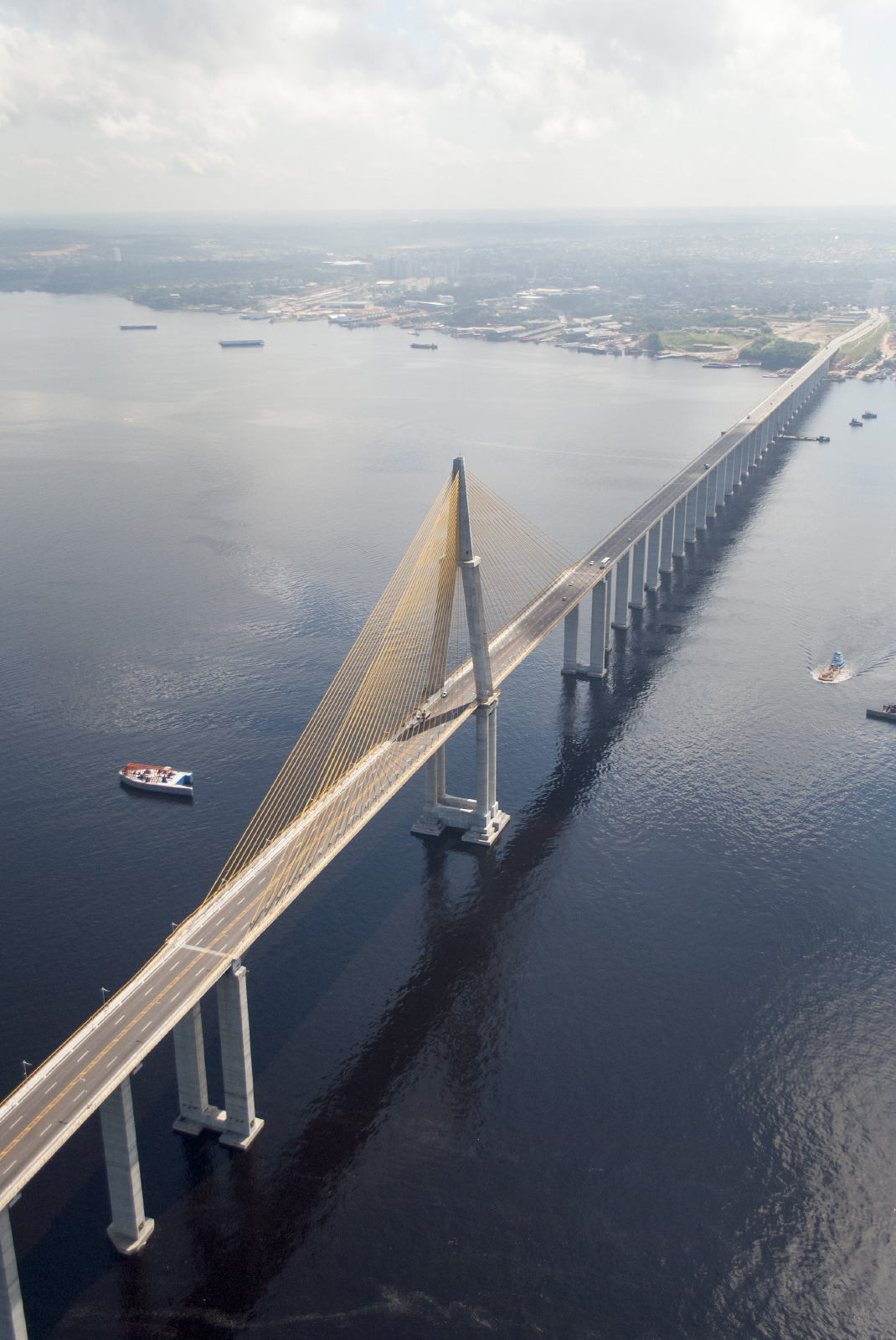
Rio Negro Bridge, at 3,595 metres (11,795 ft), is the longest cable-stayed bridge in Brazil.

- Second Severn Crossing between England and Wales is 3.186 miles (5.127 km) long, consisting of a single central navigation span over the "Shoots" channel and approach viaducts on either side.
- Suez Canal Bridge, located in El Qantara, Egypt. Crossing the Suez Canal, the bridge links the continents of Africa and Asia.
- Sunshine Skyway Bridge, in the US State of Florida located near Tampa opened in 1987. The bridge replaced the original cantilever bridges which were the site of a maritime incident.
- Surgut Bridge, the longest single-pylon cable-stayed bridge in the world, crossing the Ob River in Siberia, Russia.
- Sutong Yangtze River Bridge in eastern China has the second longest cable-stayed bridge span at 1,088 metres (3,570 ft). Completed in 2008, the Sutong Bridge is one of over 40 cable-stayed bridges built over the Yangtze since 1995.
- The Tappan Zee Bridge, the replacement for the original bridge, is a twin-deck cable-stayed bridge opened in 2017 and 2018, and is both the southernmost Hudson River-crossing bridge entirely within New York State, and the first cable-stayed bridge in North America to match Boston's Zakim Bridge (see below) overall road-deck width figure of 183 feet (56 meters), spanning eight lanes.
- Tilikum Crossing in Portland, Oregon, is the first major bridge in the U.S. that was designed to allow access to transit vehicles, cyclists and pedestrians but not cars. Completed in 2015, the bridge is 1,720 feet (520 m) and spans across the Willamette River to connect the South Waterfront and Central Eastside districts.
- Ting Kau Bridge, the world's first major four-span (three towers) cable-stayed bridge, forming part of the road network connecting Hong Kong International Airport to other parts of Hong Kong.
- Varina-Enon Bridge, Carries I-295 across the James River between Henrico and Chesterfield Counties in Virginia. Varina-Enon Bridge features the world's first use of precast concrete delta frames for construction of its 630 feet (190 m) cable-stayed main span. It is an instrumental part of the Peregrine Falcon program overseen by the Virginia Department of Transportation.
- Vasco da Gama Bridge in Lisbon, Portugal is the longest bridge in Europe, with a total length of 17.2 kilometres (10.7 mi), including 0.829 kilometres (0.515 mi) for the main bridge, 11.5 kilometres (7.1 mi) in viaducts and 4.8 kilometres (3.0 mi) in extension roads.
- The Leonard P. Zakim Bunker Hill Memorial Bridge in downtown Boston, Massachusetts spanning the Charles River is the cable-stayed bridge with the world's widest roadbed for such a bridge, at some 183 feet (56 m), encompassing ten lanes of traffic. It is also the first cable-stayed bridge with an asymmetrical deck design, with two of the 10 lanes cantilevered from the south side of the main bridge deck.
- The Kazungula Bridge is a road and rail bridge over the Zambezi river between the countries of Zambia and Botswana (3,028 feet).
- Zárate–Brazo Largo Bridges over the Paraná Guazú and Paraná de las Palmas Rivers in Argentina (1972–1976) are the first two road and railway long-span cable-stayed steel bridges in the world. Spans: 110 metres (360 ft) + 330 metres (1,080 ft) + 110 metres (360 ft).
- Vidyasagar Setu, also known as the Second Hooghly Bridge, over the Hooghly river, happens to be the first and longest such bridge in India and one of the longest in Asia. It connects the twin cities of Howrah and Kolkata.

== See also ==
- Floating cable-stayed bridge
- Cable-stayed suspension bridge
- Pont du Bonhomme
