= List of bridges on the National Register of Historic Places in Texas =

This is a list of bridges currently on the National Register of Historic Places in the U.S. state of Texas.

Name	Image	Built	Listed	Location	County	Type
Allen Water Station		1910	2009-12-03	Allen; 33.11725°N 96.666008°W	Collin	Unknown bridge type. Included in Historic District listing
Almeda Road Bridge over Brays Bayou		1931	2007-11-29	Houston; 29°42′47.5″N 95°22′55.5″W	Harris	Continuous span concrete beam
Angelina River Bridge		1935	1988-12-22	Lufkin; 31°27′25″N 94°43′34″W	Angelina	Span concrete beam Demolished circa 1998
Beaver Creek Bridge		1925	1996-10-10	Electra; 33°54′21″N 98°54′17″W	Wichita	Warren pony truss
Bedstead Truss Bridge	Bedstead Truss Bridge	1888	2013-11-29	Schulenburg; 29.67405°N 96.91084°W	Fayette	
Bluff Dale Suspension Bridge	Bluff Dale Suspension Bridge	ca. 1895, 1925, 1934	1977-12-20	Bluff Dale; 32°21′15″N 98°1′32″W	Erath	Cable-stayed
Brackenridge Park Bridge		1890	2011-08-04	San Antonio; 29.4632°N 98.4692°W	Bexar	Lenticular truss bridge. Included in Brackenridge Park Historic District listing.
Brazoria Bridge		1939	1991-06-14	Brazoria; 29°3′15″N 95°33′25″W	Brazoria	Parker through truss
Bunton Branch Bridge		1915, 1917, 1932	2002-02-19	Kyle; 30°1′5″N 97°51′31.5″W	Hays	Concrete arch
Burr's Ferry Bridge	Burrs Ferry Bridge	1936, 1937	1998-05-18	Burkeville; 31°3′50″N 93°31′13″W	Newton	Parker through truss
Colorado River Bridge		1930	1993-03-18	Wharton; 29°18′30″N 96°6′13″W	Wharton	Parker though truss
Colorado River Bridge at Bastrop		1923	1990-07-19	Bastrop; 30°6′35.25″N 97°19′21.75″W	Bastrop	Parker through truss
Cow Bayou Swing Bridge		1940	2010-5-10	Bridge City; 30°02′41″N 93°49′17″W	Orange	
Cummins Creek Bridge		1890	1975-04-21	Round Top; 30°4′7″N 96°43′9″W	Fayette	Pratt through truss
Deweyville Swing Bridge		1936	2011-06-08	Deweyville	Newton	
Dionicio Rodriguez Bridge in Brackenridge Park		ca. 1926	2004-10-22	San Antonio; 29°27′53.5″N 98°28′7″W	Bexar	Faux Bois sculpture
East Navidad River Bridge		1923	2014-8-18	Schulenburg; 29.682939°N 96.846481°W	Fayette	
Faust Street Bridge		1887	2009-3-17	New Braunfels; 29°41′48″N 98°6′25″W	Comal	
Fort Griffin Brazos River Bridge	Fort Griffin Bridge	1885	1979-10-16	Fort Griffin; 32°56′5″N 99°13′26″W	Shackelford	Pratt through truss
Galveston Causeway		1912, 1922	1976-12-12	Galveston; 29°17′51″N 94°53′12″W	Galveston	Concrete arch
Gregory Road Bridge at Duck Creek		1923	2004-01-14	Sanger; 33°25′29″N 97°13′59″W	Denton	Warren pony truss
Hays Street Bridge		1908	2012-9-10	San Antonio	Bexar	Truss. Included in Historic Bridges of Texas MPS
Hill Street Bridge over Buffalo Bayou	Hill Street Bridge	1938	2007-10-31	Houston; 29°45′40″N 95°20′36″W	Harris	Steel beam
Houston Street Viaduct	Houston Street Viaduct	1910, 1911	1984-08-09	Dallas; 32°46′12″N 96°48′31″W	Dallas	Continuous span concrete arch
Hubbard Creek Bridge		1928, 1929	1996-10-10	Albany; 32°41′25″N 99°9′53″W	Shackelford	Pratt through truss
Iron Bridge		1883	1978-12-22	Bastrop; 30°07′53″N 97°19′16″W	Bastrop	Truss Type
Kansas City, Mexico and Orient Railway and Gulf, Colorado and Santa Fe Railway Overpass		1935	1984-06-07	Sweetwater	Nolan	Concrete arched-girder. Included in Sweetwater Commercial Historic District listing
Lamar Boulevard Bridge		1941, 1942	1994-07-07	Austin; 30°15′56.5″N 97°45′24″W	Travis	Continuous span concrete arch
Lone Wolf Crossing Bridge		1922	1988-11-25	San Angelo; 31°26′45″N 100°25′30″W	Tom Green	Pratt through truss
McKee Street Bridge	McKee Street Bridge	1932	2002-09-03	Houston; 29°45′57″N 95°21′7″W	Harris	Continuous span concrete beam
Medio Creek Bridge		1897, 1923	1988-10-13	Normanna; 28°31′46″N 97°47′38″W	Bee	Pratt through truss
Missouri, Kansas & Texas Railroad Bridge at the Leon River			1990-12-26	Belton; 31°3′44″N 97°26′35″W	Bell	Parker through truss
Montopolis Bridge	Montopolis Bridge	1937, 1938	1996-10-10	Austin; 30°14′43″N 97°41′28″W	Travis	Parker through truss
Moore's Crossing Bridge	Moore's Crossing Bridge	1922	1996-10-16	Austin; 30°10′10″N 97°39′49″W	Travis	Parker through truss. Included in Moore's Crossing Historic District
Mueller Bridge		1915	2007-10-16	La Vernia; 29°21′5″N 98°4′28″W	Wilson	Warren polygonal chord truss
Mulberry Creek Bridge		1888	1975-04-21	Schulenburg; 29°40′27″N 96°54′39″W	Fayette	Pratt pony truss. Removed from NRHP on May 20, 2013.
Nolan River Bridge 303-A of the Gulf, Colorado and Santa Fe Railway	Nolan River Bridge	1903	2012-12-4	Cty. Rd. 1127 at Nolan R. 32°8′50″N 97°23′49″W	Hill	
Paddock Viaduct	Paddock Viaduct	1912, 1914	1976-03-15	Fort Worth; 32°45′36″N 97°20′5″W	Tarrant	Continuous span concrete arch
Port Arthur-Orange Bridge		1936, 1938	1996-10-10	Groves; 29°58′11″N 93°52′24″W	Jefferson	Cantilever through truss
Rector Road Bridge at Clear Creek		1907, 1908	2004-01-14	Sanger; 33°19′50″N 97°8′56″W	Denton	Pratt through truss Relocated to 7501 Teasley Lane, Denton
Regency Suspension Bridge		1939	1976-12-12	Regency; 31°24′37″N 98°50′45″W	Mills	Suspension
Riverside Swinging Bridge		1904	1979-09-12	Riverside; 30°51′26″N 95°23′46″W	Trinity, Walker	Pratt through truss
Roma-San Pedro International Bridge		1927, 1928	1984-03-23	Roma-Los Saenz; 26°24′13″N 99°1′6″W	Starr	Suspension
Route 66 Bridge over the Chicago, Rock Island and Gulf Railroad		1932	2007-04-03	Shamrock; 35°13′35″N 100°6′20″W	Wheeler	
Sabine Street Bridge over Buffalo Bayou		1924	2007-09-28	Houston; 29°45′40.75″N 95°22′31.5″W	Harris	Concrete span
San Jacinto Street Bridge over Buffalo Bayou		1914	2007-10-16	Houston; 29°45′47.75″N 95°21′27″W	Harris	Concrete arch
State Highway 16 Bridge at the Brazos River		1938, 1939	1996-10-10	Benjamin; 33°30′0″N 99°48′5″W	Knox	Warren through truss
State Highway 19 Bridge at Trinity River		1940	2004-12-01	Riverside; 30°51′35″N 95°23′55″W	Trinity, Walker	Parker through truss
State Highway 23 Bridge at the Clear Fork of the Brazos River		1929	1996-10-10	Albany; 32°55′58″N 99°12′54″W	Shackelford	Parker through truss
State Highway 27 Bridge at Johnson Fork		1937, 1938	1996-10-10	Junction; 30°25′32″N 99°40′43″W	Kimble	Parker through truss
State Highway 27 Bridge at the Guadalupe River		1937, 1938	1996-10-10	Cuero; 29°3′55″N 97°19′20″W	De Witt	Parker through truss
State Highway 27 Bridge at the South Llano River		1936, 1937	1996-10-10	Junction; 30°29′13″N 99°45′43″W	Kimble	Warren through truss
State Highway 29 Bridge at the Colorado River		1937	1996-10-10	Buchanan Dam; 30°44′53″N 98°23′48″W	Burnet	Parker through truss
State Highway 3 Bridge at the Colorado River		1931, 1932	1996-10-10	Columbus; 29°42′21″N 96°32′9″W	Colorado	Parker through truss
State Highway 3 Bridge at the Nueces River		1932, 1933, 1935	1996-10-10	Uvalde; 29°12′20″N 99°54′7″W	Uvalde	Parker through truss
State Highway 3 Bridge at the Trinity River		1929, 1930	1996-10-10	Liberty; 30°3′27″N 94°49′9″W	Liberty	Parker through truss
State Highway 34 Bridge at the Trinity River		1933, 1934	1996-10-10	Rosser; 32°25′36″N 96°27′45″W	Kaufman	Parker through truss Demolished circa 1996
State Highway 35 Bridge at the West Fork of the San Jacinto River		1930, 1931	1996-10-10	Humble; 30°1′35″N 95°15′28″W	Harris	Parker through truss
State Highway 3-A Bridge at Cibolo Creek		1932, 1933	1996-10-10	Schertz; 29°30′4″N 98°11′11″W	Bexar	Parker through truss
State Highway 3-A Bridge at Plum Creek		1930, 1931	1996-10-10	Luling; 29°39′19″N 97°36′3″W	Caldwell	Parker through truss
State Highway 5 Bridge at High Creek		1920, 1921, 1935	1996-10-10	Brookston; 33°36′43″N 95°44′50″W	Lamar	Warren pony truss
State Highway 53 Bridge at the Leon River		1938, 1939	1996-10-10	Belton; 31°3′58″N 97°26′32″W	Bell	Parker through truss
State Highway 71 Bridge at the Colorado River		1940, 1941	1996-10-10	La Grange; 29°54′0″N 96°53′19″W	Fayette	Parker through truss
State Highway 78 Bridge at the Red River	State Highway Bridge 78	1937, 1938	1996-12-20	Ravenna; 33°45′10″N 96°11′45″W	Fannin	K through truss
State Highway 79 Bridge at the Red River		1939	1996-12-20	Byers; 34°7′58″N 98°5′26″W	Clay	Camelback pony truss
State Highway 89 Bridge at the Brazos River		1933, 1934	1996-10-10	Millsap; 32°40′0″N 98°1′59″W	Parker	Parker through truss
State Highway 9 Bridge at the Llano River		1936	1996-10-10	Mason; 30°39′40″N 99°6′34″W	Mason	Warren polygonal chord truss
State Highway Bridge 5 at Big Pine Creek		1920, 1921, 1935	1996-10-10	Brookston; 33°39′39″N 95°40′23″W	Lamar	Warren pony truss
Sycamore Creek Bridge	Sycamore Creek Bridge	1936	2026-02-19	Fort Worth; 32°43′52.2″N 97°17′50.4″W	Tarrant	Concrete tee-beam, girder
Telephone Road Bridge over Brays Bayou		1931	2007-11-29	Houston; 29°42′32″N 95°18′48.5″W	Harris	Continuous span concrete
Texas and New Orleans Railroad Bridge		1903	1993-03-18	Wharton; 29°18′26″N 96°6′23″W	Wharton	Camelback/Pratt through truss
Third Street Railroad Trestle		c. 1922	2021-11-23	Austin; 30.267110°N 97.750403°W	Travis	Trestle bridge
US 190 Bridge at the Colorado River		1939, 1940	1996-10-10	Lometa; 31°13′4″N 98°33′50″W	Lampasas	Warren polygonal chord truss
US 190 Bridge at the Neches River		1941, 1943	1996-10-10	Jasper; 30°51′11.75″N 94°11′53.5″W	Jasper	Parker through truss
US 281 Bridge at the Brazos River	US 281 Bridge at the Brazos River	1938, 1939	1996-10-10	Santo; 32°38′29″N 98°6′0″W	Palo Pinto	Warren polygonal chord truss
US 83 Bridge at the Salt Fork of the Red River		1939	1996-10-10	Wellington; 34°57′28″N 100°13′15″W	Collingsworth	Parker through truss Demolished circa 2012
Waco Suspension Bridge		1870	1970-06-22	Waco	McLennan	Suspension
Washburn Tunnel	Washburn Tunnel	1947	2008-4-16	Houston; 29°43′35″N 95°12′43″W	Harris	Subaqueous tunnel
Washington Avenue Bridge		1902	1998-02-20	Waco; 31°33′40″N 97°7′43″W	McLennan	Pennsylvania through truss
West Fifth Street Bridge at Shoal Creek		1931	2019-12-3	Austin; 30°16′11″N 97°45′08″W	Travis	Cantilever girder
West Sixth Street Bridge at Shoal Creek		1887	2014-8-18	Austin; 30.270462°N 97.751182°W	Travis	Masonry arch
Yale Street Bridge over White Oak Bayou		1931	2011-12-30	Houston; 29°46′32″N 95°23′55″W	Harris	
