= Matthew Cartwright House =

Matthew Cartwright House may refer to:

- Matthew Cartwright House (San Augustine, Texas), listed on the National Register of Historic Places in San Augustine County, Texas
- Matthew Cartwright House (Terrell, Texas), listed on the National Register of Historic Places in Kaufman County, Texas
