= Onion Creek =

Onion Creek may refer to:

- Onion Creek, Texas, a census-designated place
- Onion Creek (Texas), a small tributary stream of the Colorado River

- Onion Creek Bridge, the former name of the bridge at Moore's Crossing

- Onion Creek School District in Washington
- Onion Creek Club, Golf course in Austin, Texas
