= James Flanders =

James Flanders may refer to:

- James Greeley Flanders (1844–1920), member of the Wisconsin State Assembly
- James E. Flanders (c. 1849–1928), American architect

== See also ==
- Cam Clarke also known as James Flinders (born 1957), American voice actor
