= Austin Bridge Company =

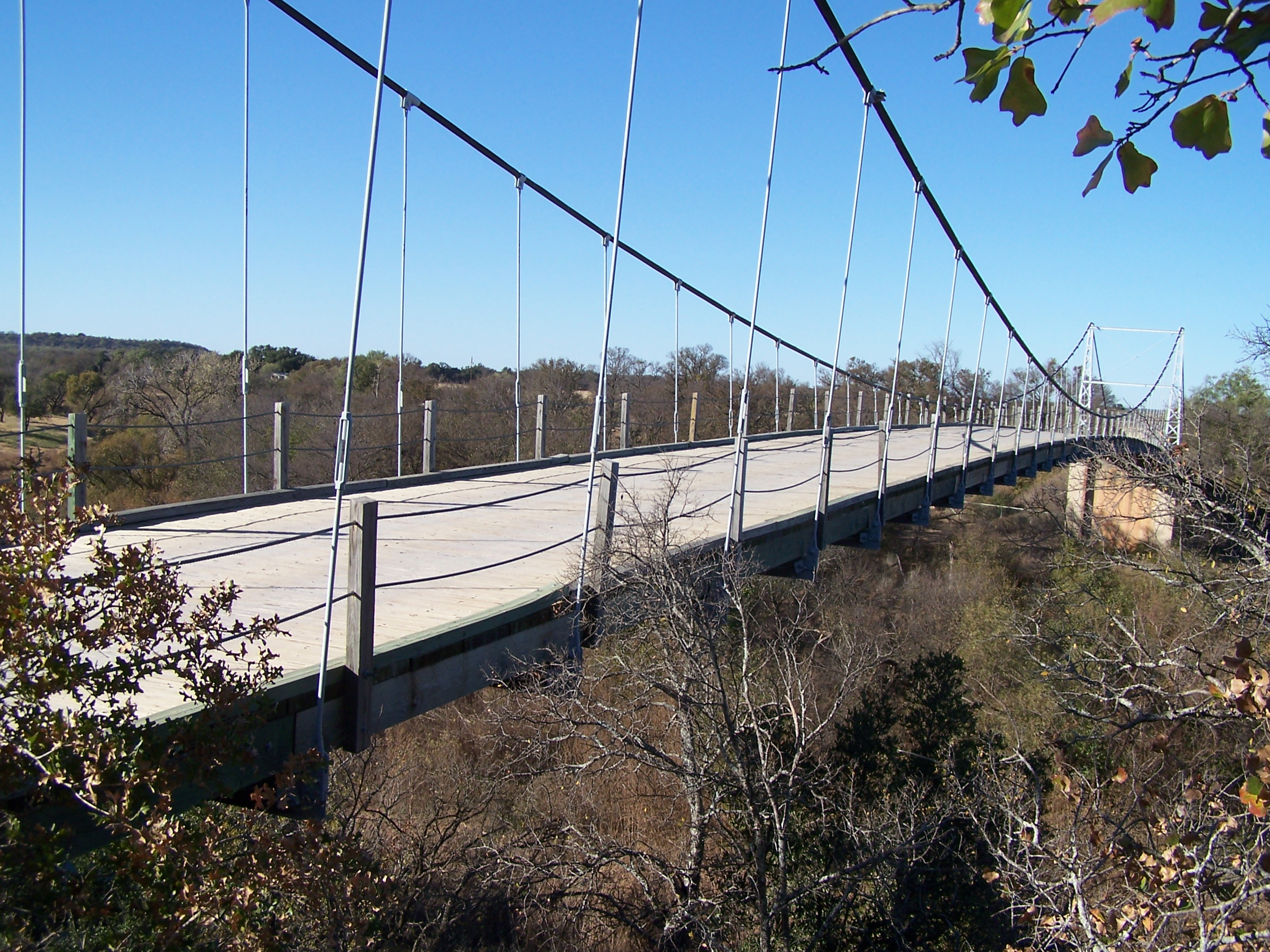
Regency Suspension Bridge in 2005

Austin Bridge Company was a bridge company based in Dallas, Texas. It fabricated and built a number of bridges that are listed on the U.S. National Register of Historic Places. It eventually became part of Austin Industries.

Its works include:

- Beaver Creek Bridge (Electra, Texas), FM 2326, 1 mi W of jct. with TX 25 Electra, Texas Austin Bridge Company, NRHP-listed
- Colorado River Bridge, S. Richmond Rd. (Old US 59) across the Colorado R., Wharton, Texas Austin Bridge Company, NRHP-listed
- Regency Suspension Bridge, 0.75 mi. S of Regency at Colorado River, Regency, Texas, Austin Bridge Co., NRHP-listed
- State Highway 29 Bridge at the Colorado River, TX 29 at the Llano County line Buchanan Dam, Texas, Austin Bridge Co., et al., NRHP-listed
- State Highway 3 Bridge at the Colorado River, US 90, .6 mi. E of jct. with Loop 329 Columbus, Texas, Austin Bridge Co., et al., NRHP-listed
- State Highway 3 Bridge at the Trinity River, US 90, 1.3 mi. W of jct. with FM 2684 Liberty, Texas, Austin Bridge Company, NRHP-listed
- State Highway 34 Bridge at the Trinity River, TX 34 at the Ellis and Kaufman county line, Rosser, Texas Austin Bridge Co., et al., NRHP-listed
- State Highway 53 Bridge at the Leon River, FM 817, 2.5 mi. E of jct. with FM 93 Belton, Texas, Austin Bridge Company, et al., NRHP-listed
- State Highway 71 Bridge at the Colorado River, TX 71, .8 mi E of jct. with FM 609 La Grange, Texas, Austin Bridge Company, NRHP-listed
- Moore's Crossing, roughly bounded by FM 973, old Burleson Rd. and Onion Cr., Austin Bridge Company, NRHP-listed
