= National Register of Historic Places listings in San Saba County, Texas =

Location of San Saba County in Texas

This is a list of the National Register of Historic Places listings in San Saba County, Texas.

This is intended to be a complete list of properties listed on the National Register of Historic Places in San Saba County, Texas. There are three properties listed on the National Register in the county. One property is both a State Antiquities Landmark and a Recorded Texas Historic Landmark.

This National Park Service list is complete through NPS recent listings posted August 8, 2025.

== Current listings ==
The locations of National Register properties may be seen in a mapping service provided.

	Name on the Register	Image	Date listed	Location	City or town	Description
1	Regency Suspension Bridge	Regency Suspension Bridge	December 12, 1976 (#76002052)	0.75 miles (1.21 km) south of Regency at the Colorado River; 31°24′37″N 98°50′45″W	Regency	Extends into Mills County
2	San Saba County Courthouse	San Saba County Courthouse	May 1, 2003 (#03000328)	500 E. Wallace; 31°11′43″N 98°43′00″W	San Saba	State Antiquities Landmark, Recorded Texas Historic Landmark
3	US 190 Bridge at the Colorado River	US 190 Bridge at the Colorado River	October 10, 1996 (#96001125)	U.S. Route 190 at the Lampasas County line 31°13′04″N 98°33′50″W	Lometa	

== See also ==
- National Register of Historic Places listings in Texas
- Recorded Texas Historic Landmarks in San Saba County
