= National Register of Historic Places listings in Mills County, Texas =

Location of Mills County in Texas

Three properties in Mills County, Texas, are listed on the National Register of Historic Places. Two properties together are part of a State Antiquities Landmark and are each Recorded Texas Historic Landmarks. The remaining property is also a State Antiquities Landmark.

This National Park Service list is complete through NPS recent listings posted May 1, 2026.

== Current listings ==
The locations of National Register properties may be seen in a mapping service provided.

	Name on the Register	Image	Date listed	Location	City or town	Description
1	Mills County Courthouse	Mills County Courthouse	November 8, 2000 (#00001359)	1011 Fourth St. 31°26′59″N 98°34′10″W	Goldthwaite	Part of State Antiquities Landmark, Recorded Texas Historic Landmark
2	Mills County Jailhouse	Mills County Jailhouse	May 8, 1979 (#79002994)	Fisher and 5th Sts. 31°26′58″N 98°34′07″W	Goldthwaite	Part of State Antiquities Landmark, Recorded Texas Historic Landmark
3	Regency Suspension Bridge	Regency Suspension Bridge	December 12, 1976 (#76002052)	0.75 mi (1.21 km). S of Regency at Colorado River; 31°24′37″N 98°50′45″W	Regency	State Antiquities Landmark; extends into San Saba County

== See also ==
- National Register of Historic Places listings in Texas
- Recorded Texas Historic Landmarks in Mills County
