= Heard-Craig House =

Historic house in Texas, United States

- U.S. National Register of Historic Places
- Recorded Texas Historic Landmark
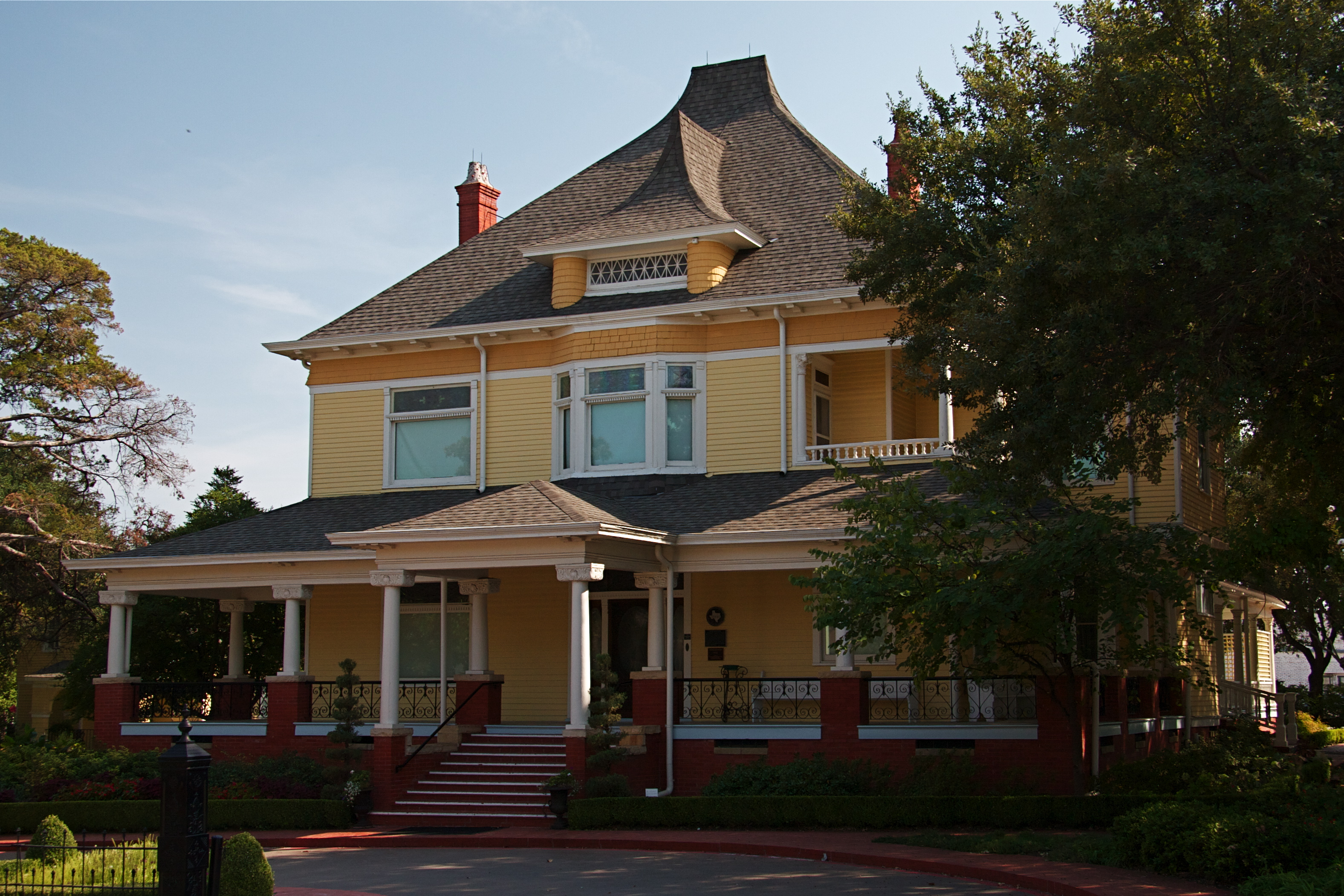
- Heard-Craig House in 2012

- Location within Texas Location within the United States
- Location: 205 W. Hunt, McKinney, Texas
- Coordinates: 33.19908°N 96.617125°W
- Area: 1.5 acres (0.61 ha)
- Built: 1900
- Built by: Hamilton & Martin
- Architect: James E. Flanders
- Architectural style: Queen Anne
- MPS: McKinney MPS
- NRHP reference No.: 87001711
- RTHL No.: 6165

Significant dates
- Added to NRHP: October 8, 1987
- Designated RTHL: 1975

The Heard-Craig House is a historic house museum in McKinney, Texas, U.S.. It was built for Stephen and Lillian Heard in 1900. The house has 7,000 square feet and four floors. In 1970, Kathryn Heard-Craig gifted the house museum to multiple arts organizations as a place to convene and educate. In addition to being an education hub, the center is also a Regional Art Museum boasting a large collection of Texas Art. Notable artists include Frank Earl Klepper, Allie Tenant, Jerry Bywaters, Thomas Stell, Guy Wiggins, Bruce Crane, and more. The center also showcases the work of local McKinney artists including Angel Moran, Kim Guthrie, Don Chesser, Diane Boudreaux, Mecha Via, and more. The museum hosts a stunning exhibit called ART MEETS FLORAL that showcases floral arrangements that replicate paintings; the museum also sponsors ART MEETS POETRY and hosts ART MEETS FASHION where curators design fashion outfits to match annual painting selections. Tickets for all Heard-Craig museum events can be found at www.heardcraig.org

History and Architecture

The house was designed in the Queen Anne style by architect James E. Flanders. It has been listed on the National Register of Historic Places since October 8, 1987. The front lobby has beautiful fretwork and there is a One-Of-A-Kind China Cabinet in the dining room. The china cabinet has two concave doors and three convex doors and is built under the staircase. Most of the rooms in the house have stained glass windows. The veranda wraps around the museum with a staircase leading into Katie's Garden. Beyond the garden is a historic, two-story Carriage House used for weddings, parties, bridal showers, and club meetings.It is a two-story frame building with a hipped roof.

The Collections

In addition to its Regional Art Collection, the museum shares Smithsonian Traveling exhibits in concert with other exhibits in its collection including:

- An Enid Collins Purse Collection
- Over 200 Vintage (1800s) photo albums from across the U.S.
- A Vintage Hat collection from the Kathryn Heard-Craig, Bessie Heard, Mary Lou Smith, and Donna Darling Stracener Collections.
- The Stephen and John Heard business ledgers (from the Heard Mercantile, the Cotton Mill, the McKinney Compress Company, etc.) have been scanned by the University of North Texas and are available on the Portal to Texas History.

Heard-Craig Events

The center films Collin County Oral History segments every year. The Oral History videos are accessible on the McKinney Public Library website as well as on the Collin College website. Oral history interviews have been conducted by Ms. Cathy Apple, author of the Heard Legacy book, Mrs. Nina Dowell Ringley from the Collin County History Museum, and Dr. Karen Zupanic from the Heard-Craig Center. Videography is by Stonebridge Videography. Anyone from Collin County interested in being a part of the Oral History series can call 972-569-6909.

Notable people from the Heard family legacy are: Stephen Dudley Heard, Lillie Dale Snapp Heard, John Spencer Heard, Rachel Wilson Heard, Kathryn Heard-Craig, Thomas Craig, Bessie Heard, Nina Heard Astin, Roger Astin, John Heard Astin, John Astin Perkins (John Astin Perkins - Wikipedia), Laura Heard Shoup, and Kathryn Dale Heard Lambert.

== See also ==
- National Register of Historic Places listings in Collin County, Texas
- Recorded Texas Historic Landmarks in Collin County
