= Regency Bridge =

- Regency Suspension Bridge
- U.S. National Register of Historic Places
- Texas State Antiquities Landmark
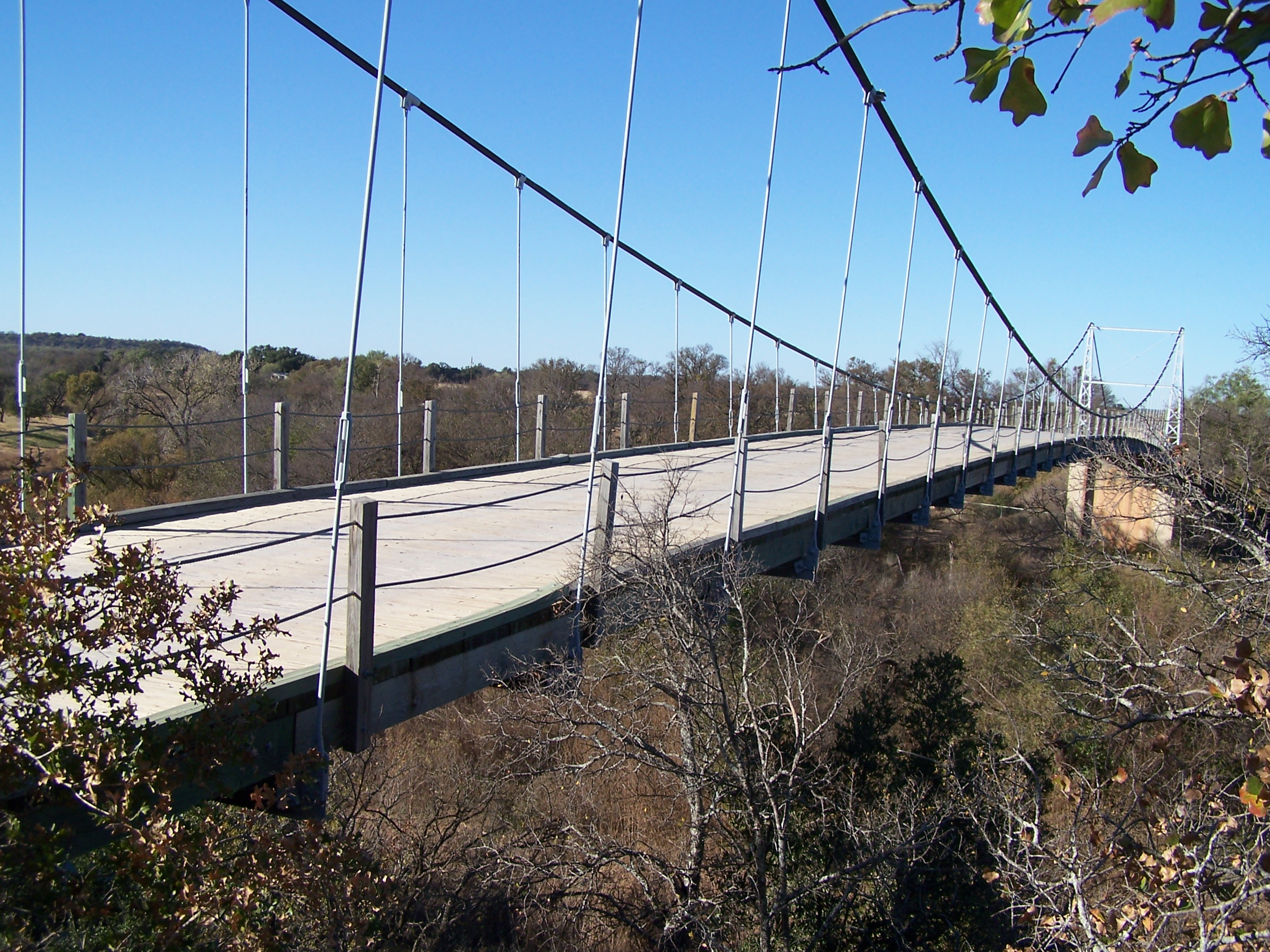
- Side view of Regency Bridge from 2005.

- Location within Texas Location within the United States
- Nearest city: Regency, Texas
- Coordinates: 31°24′37″N 98°50′45″W
- Area: less than one acre
- Built: 1939
- Architect: Austin Bridge Company
- NRHP reference No.: 76002052
- TSAL No.: 8200000478

Significant dates
- Added to NRHP: December 12, 1976
- Designated TSAL: May 28, 1981

The Regency Bridge, locally known as the "Swinging Bridge," is a one-lane suspension bridge over the Colorado River in Texas. It is located at the intersection of Mills County Road 433 and San Saba County Road 137, both gravel roads, near a small community called Regency. The bridge spans the Colorado River between Mills and San Saba counties.

== History ==
The main span is 343 feet (105 m) long, but counting the approach spans, engineers list the bridge’s overall length at 403 feet (123 m). The wooden deck of the bridge is 16 feet (4.9 m) wide. It was built in 1939, with most of the work being done by hand. An earlier bridge constructed in 1903 collapsed under the weight of a herd of cattle, and a later bridge built in 1936 washed away in a flood. The Regency Bridge was restored by James Harris in 1997, with then-Governor Bush attending the re-dedication service. This was a major event for the community of around 25 people.

Local teenagers accidentally set the wood surface on fire on December 29, 2003, burning a hole in some planks and causing $20,000 in damage. The bridge was repaired and reopened to traffic in early 2005. After closing in late 2014, the bridge is once again open to traffic. After a closure in Sept 2020 due to structural damage, the bridge was re-opened to traffic in May 2021.

In 2005, the Regency Bridge became the last suspension bridge in Texas open to automobile traffic.

== Commemoration ==
A nearby historical marker, located on the southeast side of the intersection of FM 574 and Mills County Road 433 (which is just east of the intersection of FM 45 and FM 574) reads:

This area's first Colorado River bridge was at Regency, on Mills-San Saba County line. Built 1903, it served ranchers and farmers for going to market, but fell in 1924, killing a boy, a horse, and some cattle. Its successor was demolished by a 1936 flood. With 90 per cent of the work done by hand labor, the Regency Suspension Bridge was erected in 1939. It became the pride of the locality, and youths gathered there in the 1940s to picnic, dance, and sing. Bypassed by paved farm roads, it now (1976) survives as one of the last suspension bridges in Texas.

== In popular culture ==
- The bridge is included in the opening credits for Texas Country Reporter.
- In 2017 Regency Bridge was featured on an episode of The Daytripper with Chet Garner as part of the San Saba episode.
- In 2005, Alton and Sue Watson founded the There's Something In The Water Songwriter Festival featuring musicians and songwriters from Texas, Oklahoma, and other regions. The annual festival was held for 12 years on the third weekend in April at an old campground located on the Mills County side of the river.
- World Without Waves was filmed in the area and featured the Regency bridge in several scenes.

== Gallery ==
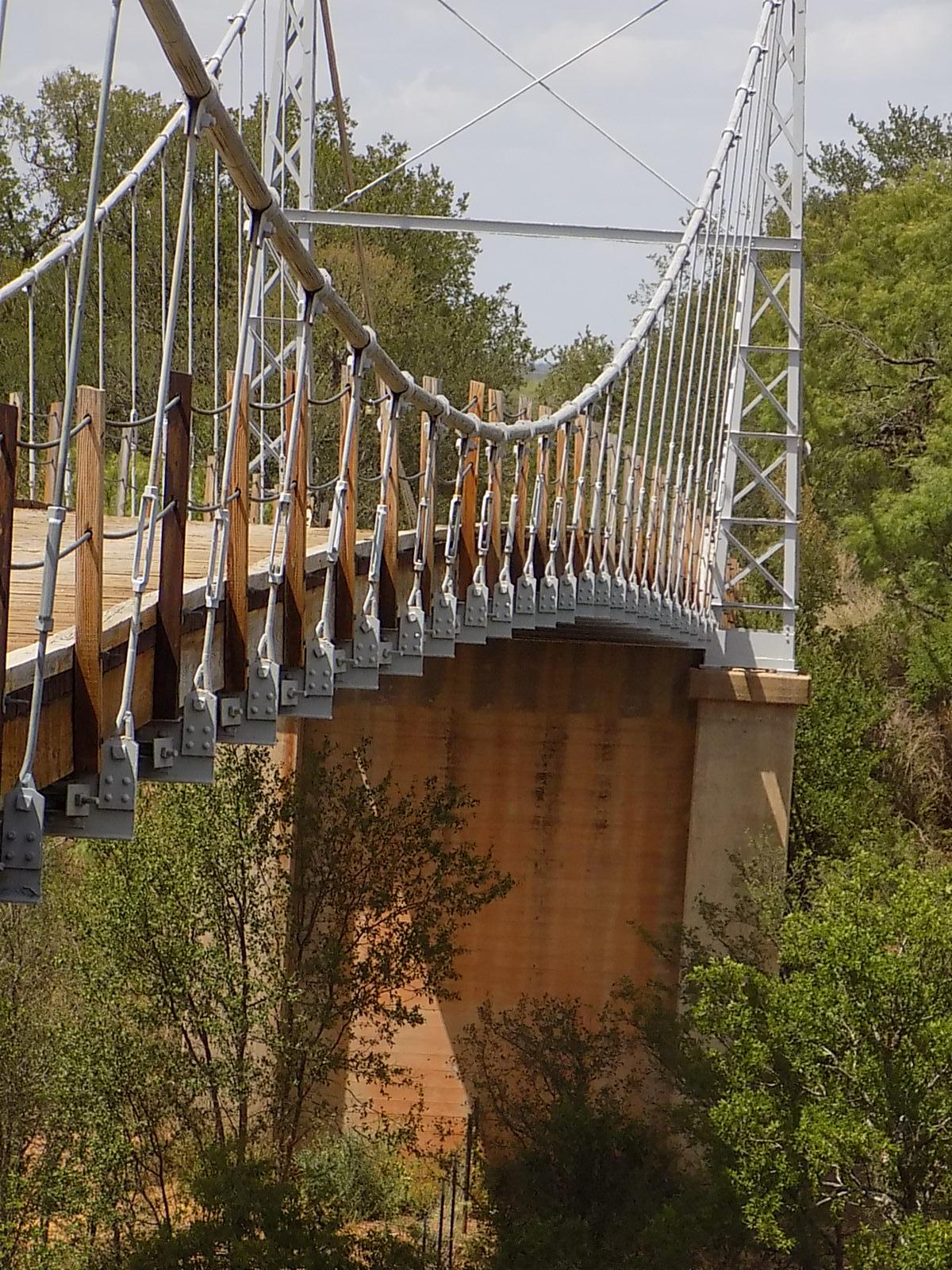
Regency suspension bridge, east side view

== See also ==
- List of bridges documented by the Historic American Engineering Record in Texas
- List of bridges on the National Register of Historic Places in Texas
- National Register of Historic Places listings in Mills County, Texas
- National Register of Historic Places listings in San Saba County, Texas
