= Navarro County Courthouse =

- U.S. National Register of Historic Places
- Texas State Antiquities Landmark
- Recorded Texas Historic Landmark
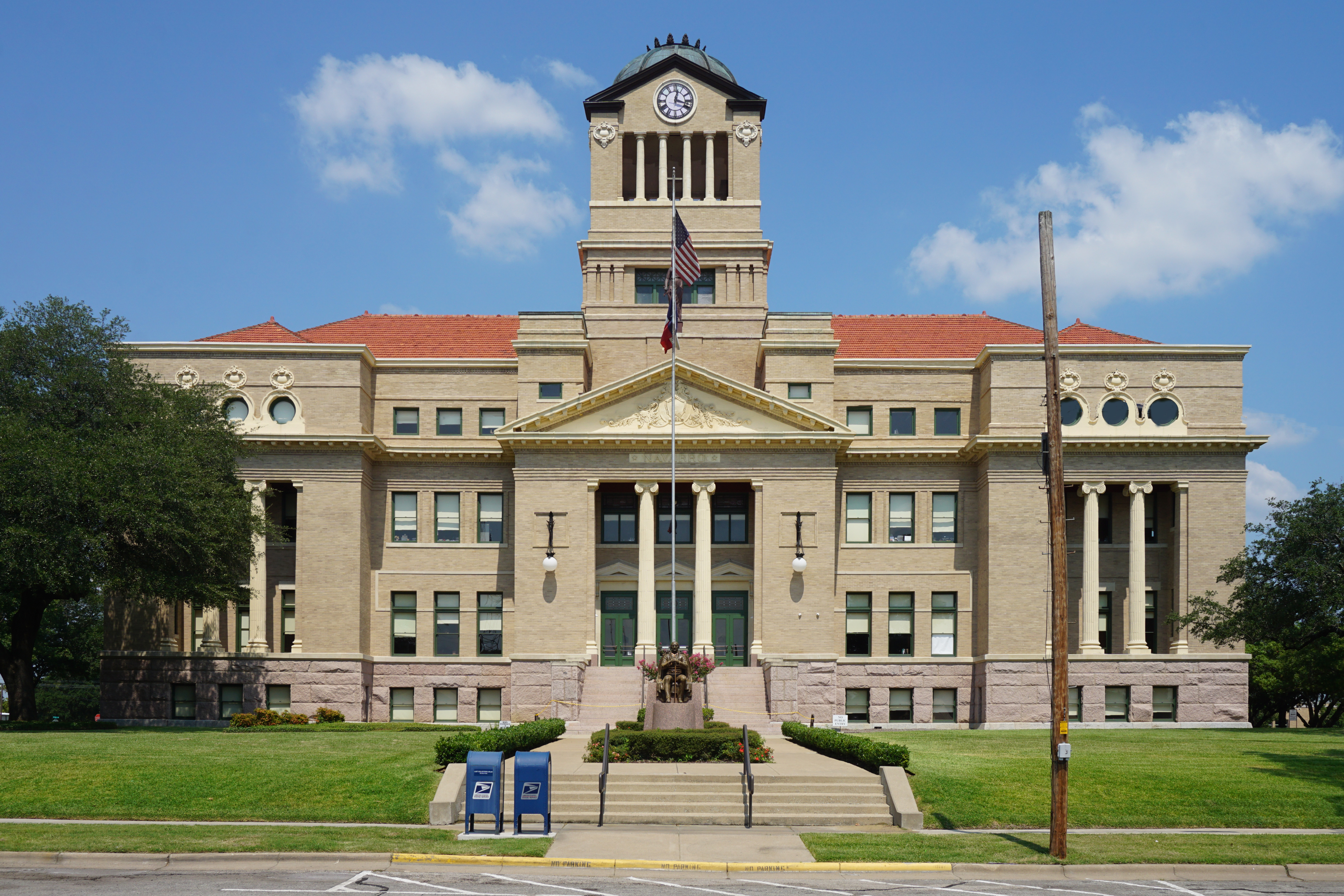
- Navarro County Courthouse in 2017

- Location within Texas Location within the United States
- Location: 300 W. 3rd Ave., Corsicana, Texas
- Coordinates: 32°5′43″N 96°28′5″W
- Area: less than one acre
- Built: 1905
- Built by: General Supply and Construction Co.
- Architect: James E. Flanders
- Architectural style: Beaux Arts
- NRHP reference No.: 04000947
- TSAL No.: 8200003164
- RTHL No.: 7236

Significant dates
- Added to NRHP: September 10, 2004
- Designated TSAL: January 1, 2010
- Designated RTHL: 1983

The Navarro County Courthouse is a historic courthouse in Corsicana, Texas, U.S.. It was designed in the Beaux Arts style by architect James E. Flanders, and completed in 1905 for $128,000. A "four-sided clock was added to the tower in 1923." It was "partially restored" in 2013.

The building has been listed on the National Register of Historic Places since September 10, 2004.

== See also ==
- National Register of Historic Places listings in Navarro County, Texas
- List of county courthouses in Texas
- Recorded Texas Historic Landmarks in Navarro County
