= Richard Moya =

Mexican-American politician (1932–2017)

Richard Moya (August 14, 1932 - February 16, 2017) was the first Mexican-American elected to public office in Travis County, Texas, becoming County Commissioner in 1970, having been elected in 1969. Characterized as a "legendary Chicano activist" and a "political trailblazer" by Austin newspapers, he led the way for Latinos to follow him into public office. As a Travis County Commissioner, Moya helped to reform county services and hiring practices, opening doors for minorities. He was instrumental in bringing county government into the modern era. Later Moya served at the state level where he continued his push for better government.

== Youth ==
Moya was born in Austin, Texas to Pete and Bertha Ramos Moya, and was raised in East Austin, a Mexican American barrio at that time.

In 1942 the family settled into a house in East Austin after Our Lady of Guadalupe Catholic Church moved there. Initially, he was enrolled in Zavala elementary, "the Mexican School". When the family moved close to Metz elementary, the school for white children, Bertha Moya confronted the segregation of Mexican-American students. She insisted he attend Metz, in spite of expectations. At that time the boundaries for the two schools were identical, but Zavala was considered the Mexican School. Referring to Metz, Moya said "They were maybe six or seven Hispanics in the whole school. My sister and I never went outside for recess”. This early experience established Moya's determination to defend the underdog.

After Allen Junior High he attended Austin High School, where he and his friends published the Blah, Blah, and Blah, because Mexican American coverage was excluded from the school's official student newspaper. When their paper was banned they published off campus with the help of the director of the Comal Recreation Center and continued distributing it at a store close to the high school.

During his teen years, he spent time at the Pan American recreation center. There he learned from, Roy "Mr G" Guerrero, a 34-year employee of the Austin Parks and Recreation Department. Moya considered Guerrero to be his mentor. Here, he developed strong leadership skills and found the value of helping others to realize their goals. With limited college opportunities after graduating from Austin High, Moya became a delivery boy for a print shop. The shop's pressmen pooled their money to pay Moya to clean the presses for them. Eventually, he learned the printing trade and became a union pressman. He had a lengthy career as a professional printer before entering politics.

== Early public service ==
Moya served as National President of the Junior LULAC. Later he was a founding member of the Mexican American Democrats of Texas. He was also a member of the State Tejano Democrats. He served briefly as a Sergeant First Class in the U.S. Army and was stationed in Korea after hostilities had ceased. He attained the rank of Sergeant 1st Class and in 1955 was honorably discharged.

== Travis County Legal Aid Society ==
In the mid-’60s, the Travis County Legal Aid Society sought to hire a chief investigator. Knowing Moya had connections in the community, Justice of the Peace Jerry Dellana encouraged him to apply for the non-lawyer chief investigator position. His community contacts and his Spanish speaking ability gave him the edge over several veteran law enforcement applicants. As chief investigator, he became familiar with the courthouse and its staff.

== Travis County Commissioner ==
Moya became the first Hispanic Travis County commissioner when he was elected in 1969, taking office in 1970. At the time no Hispanic had ever been elected to local public office. He credited his election victory to the support of the striking workers of the Economy Furniture Company, where 252 Hispanic workers had walked off their jobs in November 1968. The workers helped with his campaign and used the $21 a week they got on the picket line to help cover $1,200 for Moya's radio ads. He repaid the workers with one of his first acts as commissioner, securing a resolution designating the date of a labor rally as “Cesar Chavez Day.” This paved the way for labor organizer Cesar Chavez to speak at the strike rally at the Texas Capitol on November 29, 1970.

Following his election, Gus Garcia was elected to the Austin school board, Gonzalo Barrientos was elected to the Texas Legislature and John Treviño to the Austin City Council.

Moya was the only minority on the Commissioners Court, "an outsider in another world," observed colleague Gonzalo Barrientos Jr. "He went from outsider to the driving force that ushered Travis County government into the modern era."

He targeted one local issue after another, always with a common focus on human dignity. He helped centralize county hiring by playing a pivotal role in establishing the county's first office of Human Resources. This promoted diversity in county hiring, since before 1970 the county employed very few minorities. “They just didn’t hire them,” Moya said. “They didn’t have a personnel office. Everybody did their own hiring. I wanted to change that.” Virgil Limón, a retiree of the county's district clerk's office, said “He also opened the doors for minorities to get hired in all parts of the county.”

He helped establish a rural transportation program called CARTS, and he supported the development of a program that became known as StarFlight which provided emergency services. He pushed for a child abuse unit in the district attorney's office and greatly improved the county's mental health services. He was a catalyst for cultural change in Travis County government.

Although he served on a commissioners court of strong personalities such as Mike Renfro, Jimmy Snell, Bob Honts and Ann Richards, he was the driving force, because "he had the ability to persuade others to follow his lead", Barrientos remembered.

Hank Davis Gonzalez, a retired Austin Police detective, took on the legendary "Moya Machine" and ousted 16-year veteran Moya from the Pct. 4 Commissioners seat in 1986. In 1998 Moya ran again for the Pct. 4 position, in a failed attempt to oust Margaret Gómez, his former employee.

== Texas State Government service ==
After leaving the commissioners court Moya worked for Jim Hightower at the Texas Department of Agriculture as the Director of Field Operations. His focus was on handling personnel issues and working with field offices.

After Ann Richards was elected Governor, she hired Moya as a Deputy Chief of Staff. He was a trouble shooter for problem agencies and he used his experience to help Richards bring diversity to state boards and commissions. Throughout, he continued his push for better government, just as he had done as a county commissioner.

== Personal life ==
In 1953 Moya married Gertrude “Gertie” Garza. Together they had a son who died at age 19 and a daughter, Lori Moya, who followed her father into politics, serving on the Austin school board from 2006 to 2014. Known as a family man, he always made time for them. A Texas Longhorn fan, he followed their football, basketball, and baseball teams.

== Legacy ==
Moya's most visible legacy is Richard Moya Park, 100 acres of woodlands and ball fields along Onion Creek, close to the Austin airport, and home of Moore's Crossing Historic District. His political legacy lives on in the changes he brought to Travis County government, having opened the door for the hiring and election of minorities.

== Death ==
Moya died after a battle with prostate cancer at age 84 in 2017.
