= Temple Beth-El (Corsicana, Texas) =

Former synagogue, now historic building in Corsicana, Texas, US

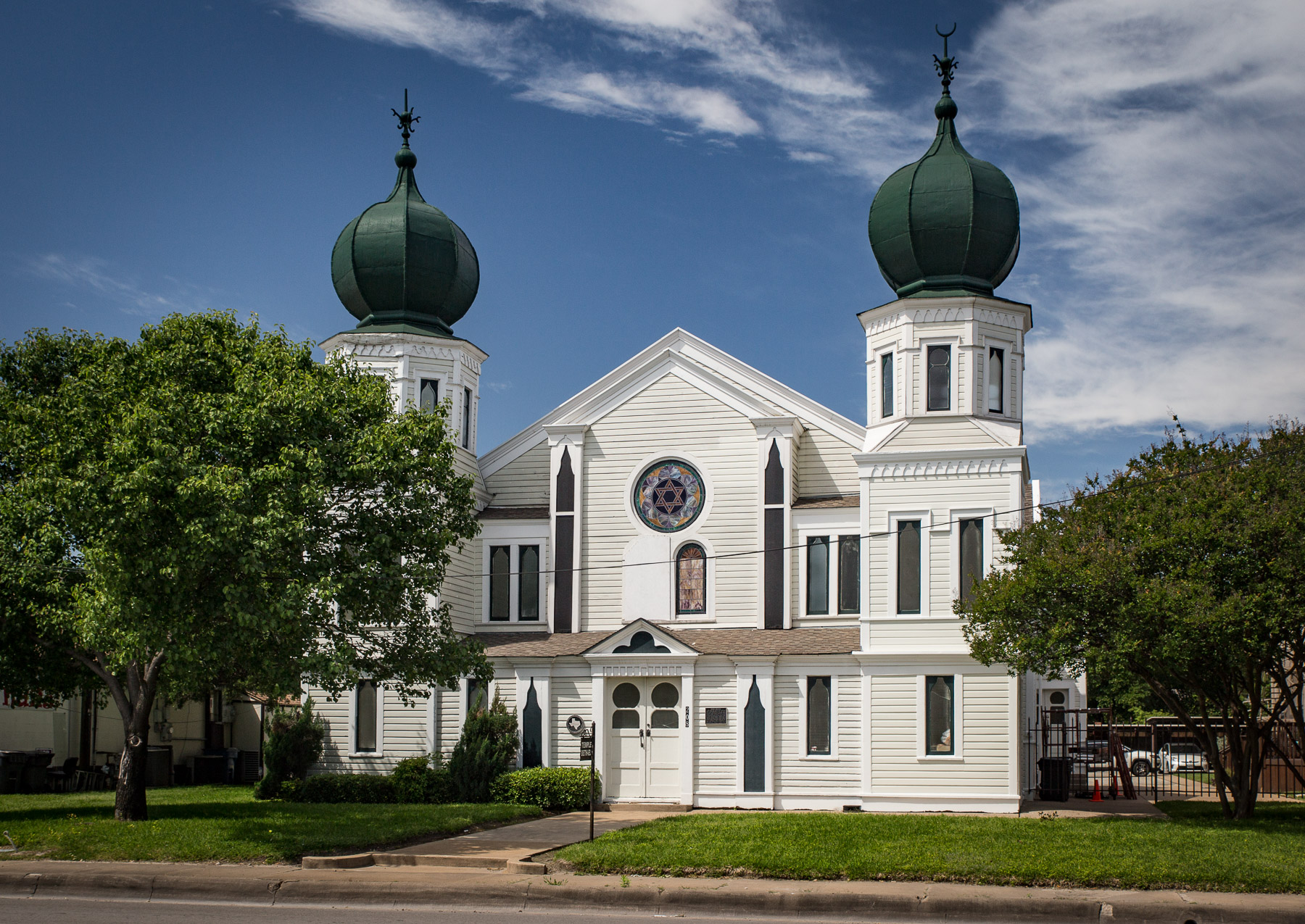
- Former Temple Beth-El, now community center

- Location in Texas

Religion
- Affiliation: Reform Judaism (former)
- Rite: Nusach Ashkenaz
- Ecclesiastical or organizational status: Synagogue (1898–1980); Community center (since 1990)
- Ownership: City of Corsicana
- Status: Closed; restored and repurposed

Location
- Location: 208 South Fifteenth Street, Corsicana, Texas
- Country: United States
- Interactive map of Temple Beth-El
- Coordinates: 32°5′22″N 96°28′6″W

Architecture
- Style: Exotic Revival; Moorish Revival
- Established: 1871 (as a congregation)
- Completed: 1898

Specifications
- Dome: Two
- Materials: Clapboard

Website
- cityofcorsicana.com/996/Temple-Beth-El
- Temple Beth-El
- U.S. National Register of Historic Places
- Texas State Antiquities Landmark
- Recorded Texas Historic Landmark
- Area: less than one acre
- NRHP reference No.: 86003687
- TSAL No.: 8200000741
- RTHL No.: 11642

Significant dates
- Added to NRHP: February 3, 1987
- Designated TSAL: January 1, 2000
- Designated RTHL: 1981

Temple Beth-El is an historic Reform Jewish former synagogue located at 208 South 15th Street in Corsicana, Navarro County, Texas, in the United States. Operating as a synagogue between 1898 and 1980, the exotic Moorish Revival-style building has been used as a community center since 1990.

== Landmark status ==
Temple Beth-El became a Recorded Texas Historic Landmark in 1981. On February 3, 1987, Temple Beth-El was added to the National Register of Historic Places. Temple Beth-El is one of two State Antiquities Landmarks in Navarro County.

== History ==
The Jewish community of Corsicana established a congregation in 1871. The congregation worshiped at each other's homes until it could raise the funding to build a synagogue.

Julius Magil served as rabbi in the early days of its new building. He was born December 29, 1870, at Mitau, Courland, which was then in the Russian Empire but is now part of Latvia. He received a secular education at Realgymnasium and University of Zürich, Switzerland. Rabbi Magil's religious training took place at the Talmudical College of Grobin, Courland. Rabbi Magil then studied medicine at Fort Wayne Medical College, and he received a Ph.D. from Rogers College in 1898.

The synagogue was built by a Reform Jewish congregation in 1898. It is a wood-frame building, with clapboard siding, keyhole windows in the front doors, and a pair of octagonal towers topped by onion domes. In 1900, 66% of the congregants were immigrants and over half were from Poland, Russia, or Hungary. 19% of the membership was from Germany and another 19% was from France. While Eastern European Jews tended towards Orthodox Judaism and German Jews tended towards Reform Judaism, Temple Beth-El was notable as a Reform synagogue with a predominantly Eastern European and heavily Polish membership.

Rabbi Ernest Joseph served as the spiritual leader of Temple Beth-El from 1968 to 1980.

In 1980, Temple Beth-El closed as a congregation, although a local rabbi still leads a Jewish service on a monthly basis. The property was donated to the City of Corsicana around 1990. The City uses it as a community center.

In 2010, the former synagogue's stained glass windows were renovated. The former synagogue's façade and domes were restored in 2013.

== See also ==
- National Register of Historic Places listings in Navarro County, Texas
- Recorded Texas Historic Landmarks in Navarro County
