= State Highway 29 Bridge at the Colorado River =

- U.S. National Register of Historic Places
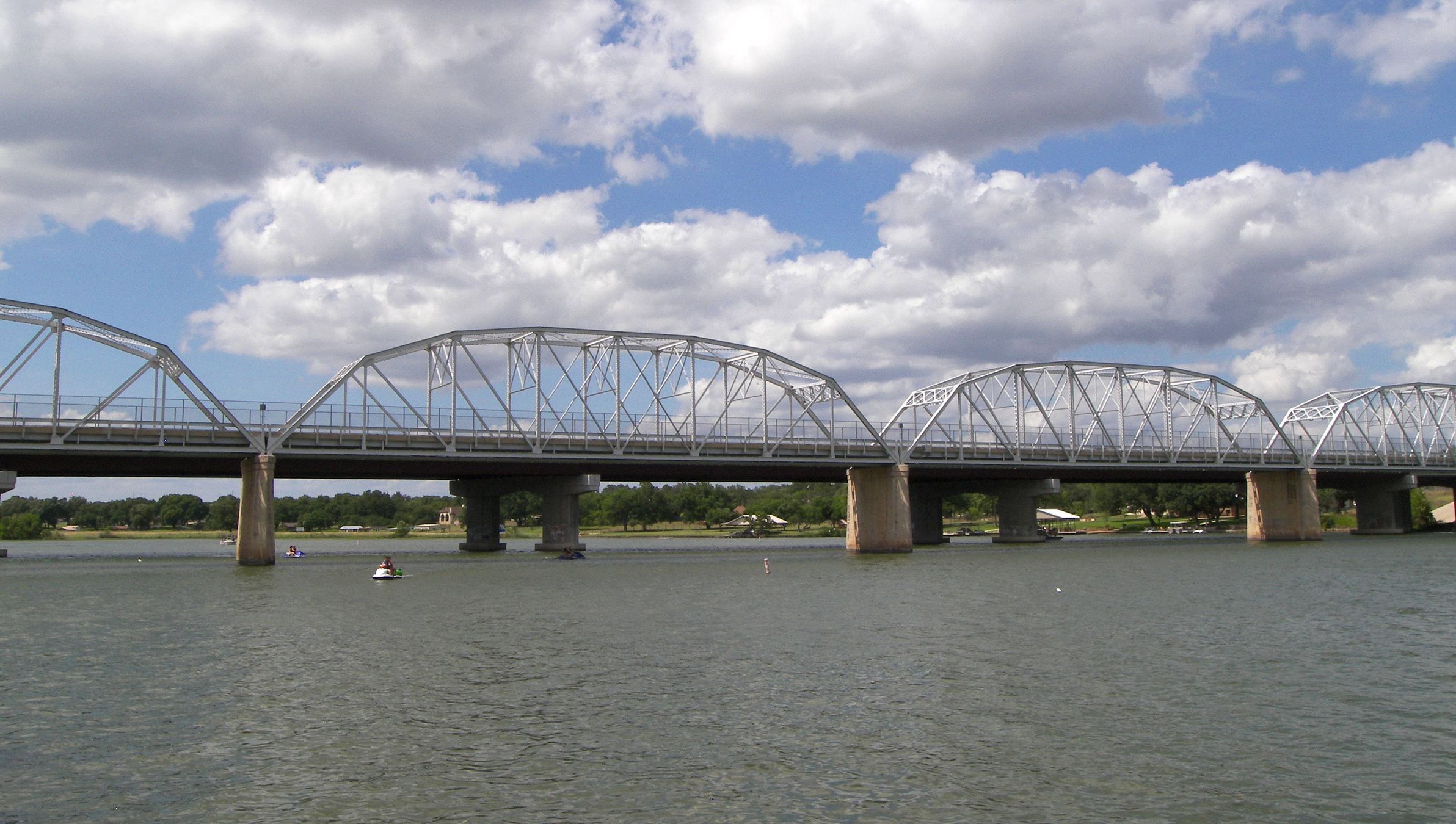
- State Highway 29 Bridge in 2010

- Location within Texas Location within the United States
- Location: SH 29 at Buchanan Dam
- Coordinates: 30°44′53″N 98°23′48″W
- Area: less than one acre
- Built: 1937
- Built by: Austin Bridge Company, et al.; Pittsburgh-Des Moines Steel Co.
- Architectural style: Parker through truss bridge
- MPS: Historic Bridges of Texas MPS
- NRHP reference No.: 96001116
- Added to NRHP: October 10, 1996

State Highway 29 Bridge at the Colorado River is located in both Burnet and Llano counties in the U.S. state of Texas, between Buchanan Dam and Inks Lake . It is also known as Inks Lake Bridge, and was added to the National Register of Historic Places listings in both counties on October 10, 1996. The 1,379.0 ft truss bridge was planned by the Texas Highway Department in 1929. Construction was completed by the Austin Bridge Company in 1937 at a cost of $188,000. United States Secretary of the Interior Harold Ickes and Texas Highway Commissioner Robert Lee Bobbitt were featured speakers during the dedication ceremony. A new four-lane vehicular bridge was built in 2005, and the old SH 29 Bridge is currently open only to pedestrians.

== See also ==
- Inks Lake
- List of bridges on the National Register of Historic Places in Texas
- National Register of Historic Places listings in Burnet County, Texas
- National Register of Historic Places listings in Llano County, Texas
- State Highway 9 Bridge at the Llano River
