= Westminster College (Texas) =

Coordinates: 31.744°N 96.545°W

What became Westminster College began in 1888 in Seven Points, Texas, United States, northeast of McKinney, Texas, where classes were first held in a building that once housed Seven Points College. Founded by J. M. Harder, the school was purchased five years later by I. P. Rosser. In 1895, he sold it to the Methodist Protestant Church and the school was named Westminster College and served as a preparatory school for ministers. Shortly thereafter, the town of Seven Points changed its name to that of the school. In 1902, Westminster outgrew the facilities and the college moved into Texas Hall in Tehuacana, Texas and continued as a junior college.

In 1942, Westminster College merged with Southwestern University, becoming part of Southwestern's "University of Small Colleges" system.

In 1950, the Westminster College closed and three years later the property was sold by Southwestern. The Congregational Methodist Church acquired the property and relocated their bible school from Dallas, Texas. The school's program was expanded to include a junior college and the institution was named Westminster College and Bible Institute.

The campus eventually included twelve buildings and the curriculum expanded to include a four-year degree, the bachelor of religion. In 1968-69 there were fifteen faculty members and ninety-five students, but by 1970 the student body had decreased to sixty. In 1971, thirty-five students and seven teachers moved to Florence, Mississippi, where it was renamed to Wesley College until its closing in 2010.
