= National Register of Historic Places listings in Kaufman County, Texas =

Location of Kaufman County in Texas

This is a list of the National Register of Historic Places listings in Kaufman County, Texas.

This is intended to be a complete list of properties listed on the National Register of Historic Places in Kaufman County, Texas. There are eight properties listed on the National Register in the county. Four properties are Recorded Texas Historic Landmarks including one that is also a State Antiquities Landmark.

This National Park Service list is complete through NPS recent listings posted March 21, 2025.

== Current listings ==
The locations of National Register properties may be seen in a mapping service provided.

	Name on the Register	Image	Date listed	Location	City or town	Description
1	William and Blanche Brooks House	William and Blanche Brooks House	July 6, 1993 (#93000566)	500 S. Center St. 32°44′34″N 96°28′24″W	Forney	Recorded Texas Historic Landmark
2	Matthew Cartwright House	Matthew Cartwright House	April 4, 1979 (#79002988)	505 Griffith Ave. 32°44′44″N 96°17′04″W	Terrell	Recorded Texas Historic Landmark
3	First National Bank Building	First National Bank Building	January 11, 1985 (#85000073)	101 E. Moore; 32°44′12″N 96°16′33″W	Terrell	
4	Walter C. Porter Farm	Walter C. Porter Farm	October 15, 1966 (#66000819)	2 mi (3.2 km). N of Terrell on FR 986; 32°46′40″N 96°16′28″W	Terrell	
5	State Highway 34 Bridge at the Trinity River		October 10, 1996 (#96001109)	TX 34 at the Ellis and Kaufman Cnty. line 32°25′36″N 96°27′45″W	Rosser	Replaced 1996; extended into Ellis County; Historic Bridges of Texas, 1866-1945 MPS
6	Terrell Carnegie Library	Terrell Carnegie Library	May 10, 2006 (#06000363)	207 N. Frances St. 32°44′17″N 96°16′42″W	Terrell	State Antiquities Landmark, Recorded Texas Historic Landmark
7	Terrell Times Star Building	Terrell Times Star Building	May 2, 1985 (#85000923)	108 S. Catherine St. 32°44′09″N 96°16′42″W	Terrell	
8	Warren-Crowell House	Warren-Crowell House	May 23, 1980 (#80004137)	705 Griffith Ave. 32°44′51″N 96°17′12″W	Terrell	Recorded Texas Historic Landmark

== See also ==
- National Register of Historic Places listings in Texas
- Recorded Texas Historic Landmarks in Kaufman County
