= Warren-Crowell House =

Historic house in Texas, United States

- U.S. National Register of Historic Places
- Recorded Texas Historic Landmark
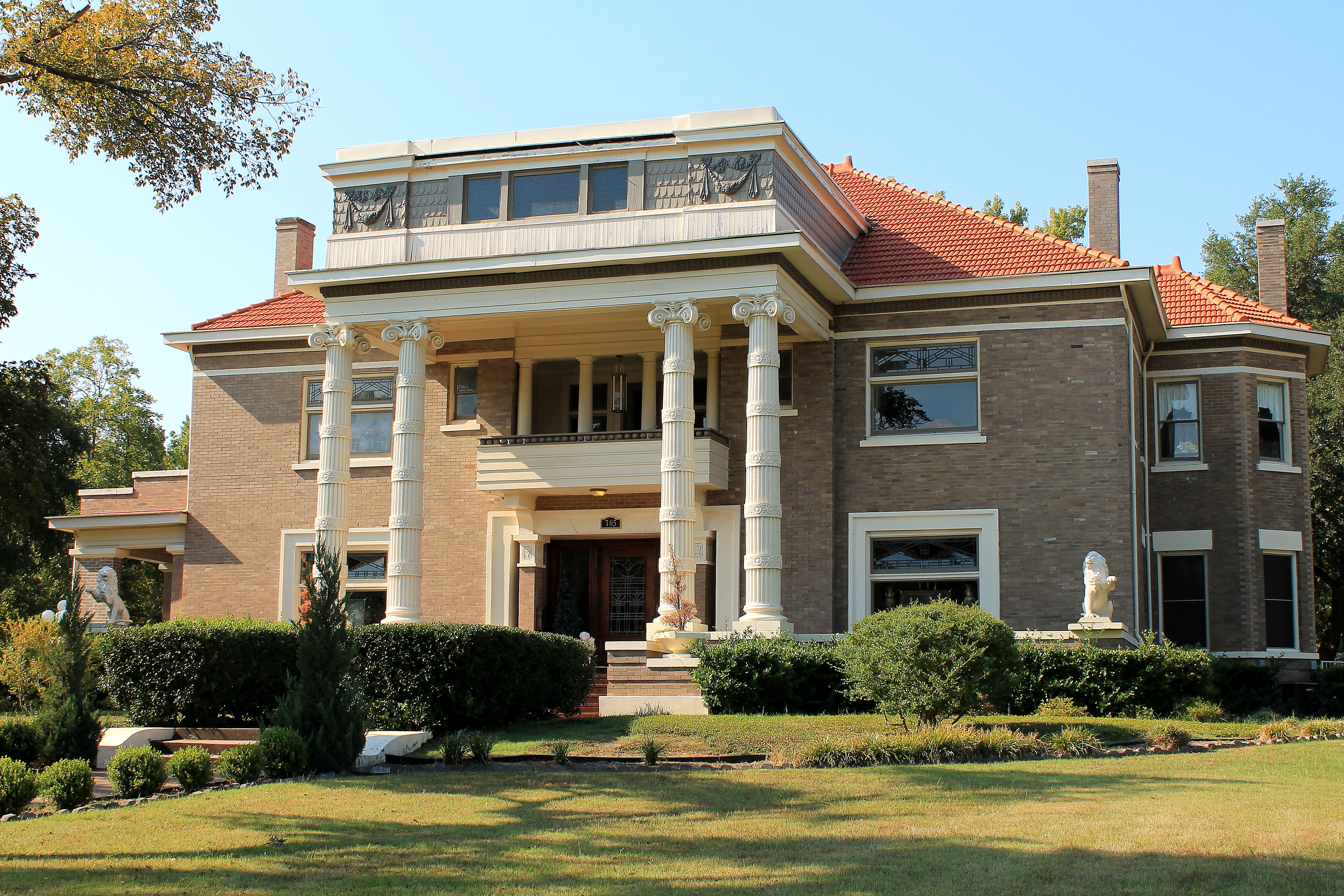
- Warren-Crowell House in 2012

- Location within Texas Location within the United States
- Location: 705 Griffith Ave., Terrell, Texas
- Coordinates: 32°44′51″N 96°17′12″W
- Area: 2.3 acres (0.93 ha)
- Built: 1903
- Architect: James E. Flanders
- Architectural style: Colonial Revival, Prairie School
- NRHP reference No.: 80004137
- RTHL No.: 8560

Significant dates
- Added to NRHP: May 23, 1980
- Designated RTHL: 1973

The Warren-Crowell House is a historic house in Terrell, Texas, U.S.. It was designed in the Prairie School style with a Colonial Revival porch by architect James E. Flanders, and completed in 1903. It has been listed on the National Register of Historic Places since May 23, 1980.

The house was purchased in January 2023 by a couple who love old houses. The Mansion had fallen on hard times, this grand home was in need of restoration. An eleven-month extensive restoration project was completed in December 2023. The property is once again a credit to the Historical homes of Terrel, Texas and the state.

== See also ==
- National Register of Historic Places listings in Kaufman County, Texas
- Recorded Texas Historic Landmarks in Kaufman County
