= National Register of Historic Places listings in Navarro County, Texas =

Location of Navarro County in Texas

This is a list of the National Register of Historic Places listings in Navarro County, Texas.

This is intended to be a complete list of properties and districts listed on the National Register of Historic Places in Navarro County, Texas. There are three districts and five individual properties listed on the National Register in the county. Two individually listed properties are designated as both State Antiquities Landmarks and Recorded Texas Historic Landmarks. Two districts contain several more Recorded Texas Historic Landmarks.

This National Park Service list is complete through NPS recent listings posted February 20, 2026.

== Current listings ==
The locations of National Register properties and districts may be seen in a mapping service provided.

	Name on the Register	Image	Date listed	Location	City or town	Description
1	Corsicana Commercial Historic District	Corsicana Commercial Historic District	May 18, 1995 (#95000601)	Roughly bounded by 2nd Ave., the Southern Pacific RR tracks, 7th Ave. and Main St. 32°05′39″N 96°27′51″W	Corsicana	NRHP doc Covered in Historic and Architectural Resources of Corsicana MPS.
2	Corsicana Oil Field Discovery Well	Corsicana Oil Field Discovery Well	August 22, 1977 (#77001462)	400 block S. 12th St. 32°05′21″N 96°27′50″W	Corsicana	
3	First Independent Baptist Church	First Independent Baptist Church	January 15, 2026 (#100012541)	703 G. W. Jackson Avenue; 32°05′50″N 96°27′32″W	Corsicana	
4	Mills Place Historic District	Mills Place Historic District	June 30, 1995 (#95000800)	Roughly bounded by W. 2nd Ave., Mills Place Dr. and W. Park Ave. 32°06′07″N 96°28′40″W	Corsicana	Includes Recorded Texas Historic Landmark; Historic and Architectural Resources of Corsicana MPS
5	Navarro County Courthouse	Navarro County Courthouse	September 10, 2004 (#04000947)	300 W. 3rd Ave. 32°05′43″N 96°28′05″W	Corsicana	State Antiquities Landmark, Recorded Texas Historic Landmark
6	Temple Beth-El	Temple Beth-El	February 3, 1987 (#86003687)	208 S. Fifteenth St. 32°05′22″N 96°28′06″W	Corsicana	State Antiquities Landmark, Recorded Texas Historic Landmark
7	Wesley Chapel Colored Methodist Episcopal Church		December 29, 2025 (#100012499)	915 G.W. Jackson Avenue; 32°05′54″N 96°27′23″W	Corsicana	
8	West Side Historic District	West Side Historic District	July 28, 1995 (#95000912)	Roughly bounded by W. 3rd Ave., 15th St., W. 6th Ave. and 31st St. 32°05′14″N 96°28′43″W	Corsicana	Includes Recorded Texas Historic Landmark; Historic and Architectural Resources of Corsicana MPS

== See also ==
- National Register of Historic Places listings in Texas
- Recorded Texas Historic Landmarks in Navarro County
