= Beaver Creek Bridge (Electra, Texas) =

- U.S. National Register of Historic Places
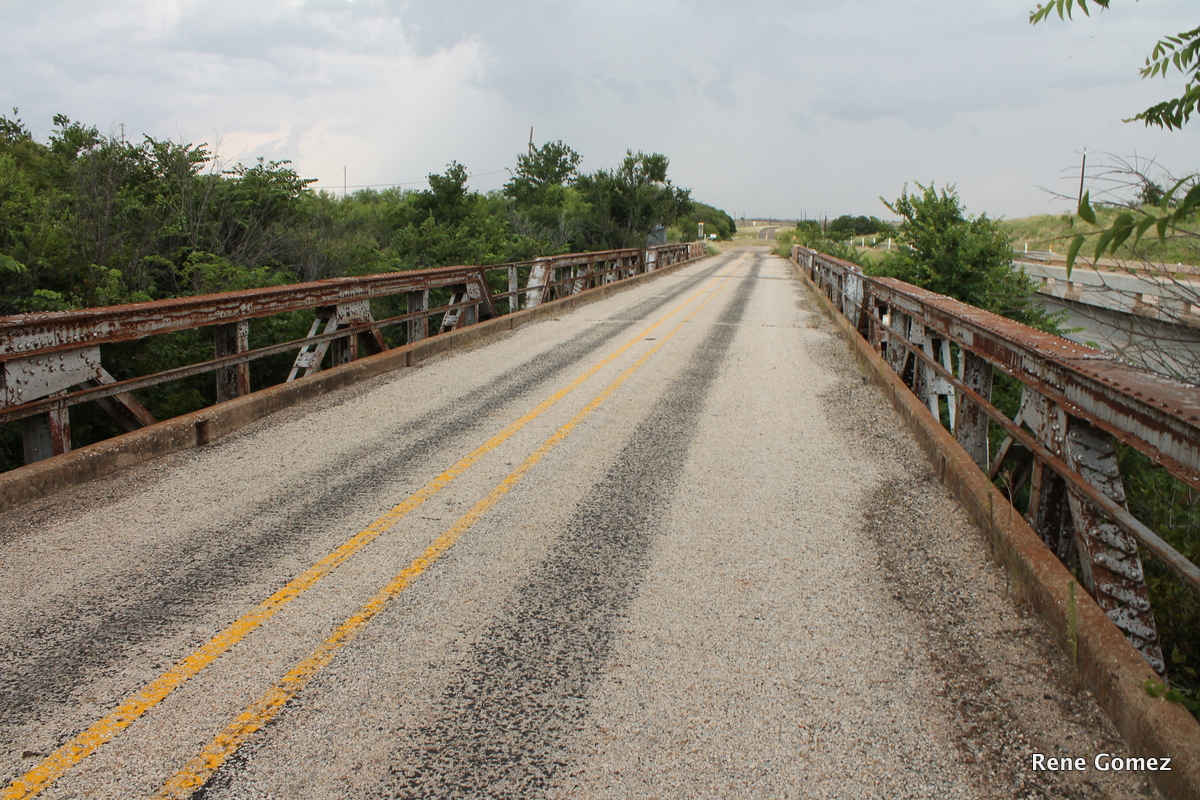

- Location within Texas Location within the United States
- Nearest city: Electra, Texas
- Coordinates: 33°54′21″N 98°54′17″W
- Area: less than one acre
- Built: 1925
- Built by: Austin Bridge Company
- Architect: Texas Highway Department
- Architectural style: Warren pony truss
- MPS: Historic Bridges of Texas MPS
- NRHP reference No.: 96001104
- Added to NRHP: October 10, 1996

Beaver Creek Bridge, also known as FM 2326 Bridge at Beaver Creek or WC2215-02-002, is a historic bridge built during 1925-1926 near Electra in Wichita County, Texas. It brings Farm-to-Market Road over Beaver Creek, connecting the Beaver Creek community with the Rock Crossing oilfield area in Wilbarger County.

It consists of three 60-foot (18 m) riveted Warren pony truss spans and a concrete girder approach span, built to Texas Highway Department standard designs. Its spans were fabricated by, and the bridge was built by, the Austin Bridge Company of Dallas, Texas.

It was listed on the National Register of Historic Places in 1996. The bridge was then eligible for rehabilitation but not yet replacement.

== See also ==
- National Register of Historic Places listings in Wichita County, Texas
- List of bridges on the National Register of Historic Places in Texas
