= Mills County Courthouse (Texas) =

- U.S. National Register of Historic Places
- Texas State Antiquities Landmark
- Recorded Texas Historic Landmark
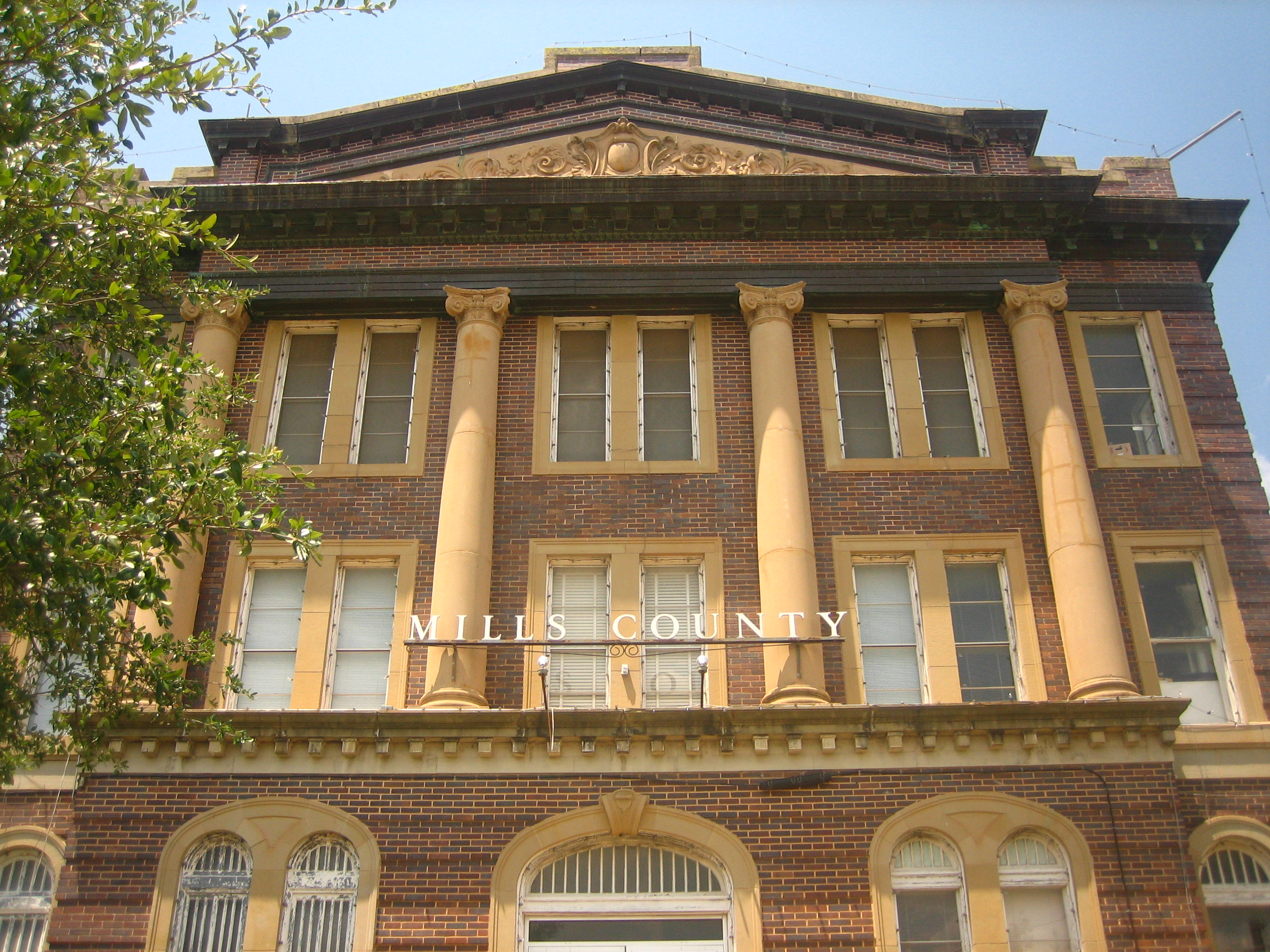
- Mills County Courthouse in 2008

- Location within Texas Location within the United States
- Location: 1011 Fourth St., Goldthwaite, Texas
- Coordinates: 31°26′59″N 98°34′10″W
- Area: less than one acre
- Built: 1913
- Architect: Henry T. Phelps
- Architectural style: Classical Revival
- NRHP reference No.: 00001359
- TSAL No.: 477
- RTHL No.: 12916

Significant dates
- Added to NRHP: November 8, 2000
- Designated TSAL: April 18, 2002
- Designated RTHL: 2002

The Mills County Courthouse, built in 1913, is an historic three-story Classical Revival-style courthouse building located at 1011 Fourth Street in Goldthwaite, Texas. Designed by San Antonio architect Henry Truman Phelps (1871–1944), it replaced the first courthouse built in 1890, which burned in 1912.

The three-story building, made of brick with a cast stone basement, is the most prominent building in Goldthwaite. On November 8, 2000, it was added to the National Register of Historic Places.

== See also ==
- National Register of Historic Places listings in Mills County, Texas
- Recorded Texas Historic Landmarks in Mills County
- List of county courthouses in Texas
