= Porter Farm =

- Walter C. Porter Farm
- U.S. National Register of Historic Places
- U.S. National Historic Landmark
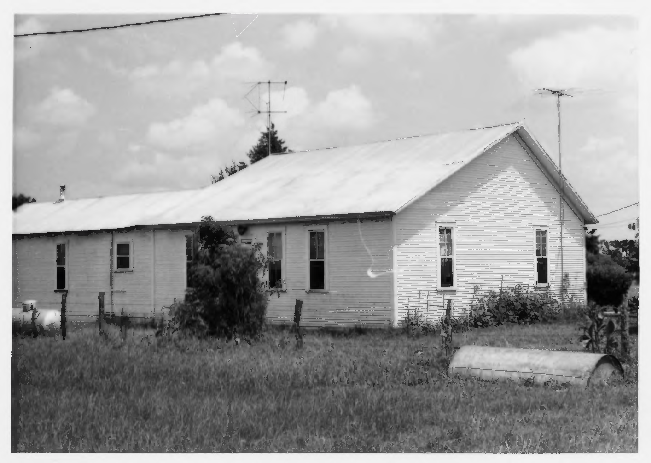
- Old farm house at Porter Farm

- Location within Texas Location within the United States
- Nearest city: Terrell, Texas
- Coordinates: 32°46′40″N 96°16′28″W
- Area: 70 acres (28 ha)
- Built: 1903
- NRHP reference No.: 66000819

Significant dates
- Added to NRHP: October 15, 1966
- Designated NHL: July 19, 1964

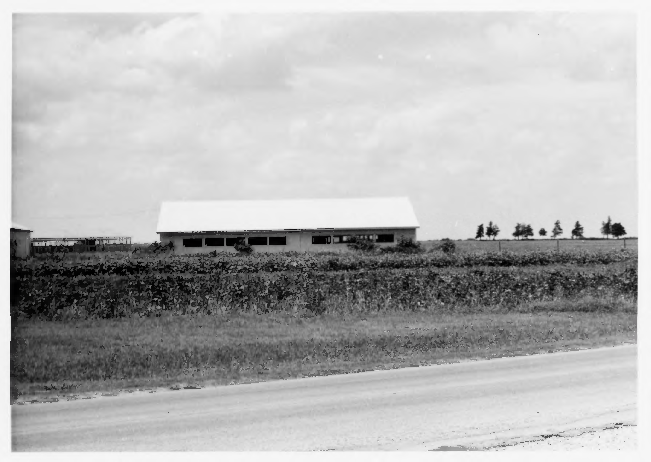
Westward view of tomato barn on south side of demonstration plat at Porter Farm

The Porter Farm, also known as Walter C. Porter Farm, is a historic farm property near Terrell in Kaufman County in the U.S. state of Texas. Porter Farm was the site of the first cooperative farm demonstration, organized in 1903 by Dr. Seaman A. Knapp. The project successfully demonstrated methods to expand crop production. The U.S. Department of Agriculture Agricultural Extension Service developed from this foundational project.

The property was designated a National Historic Landmark in 1964, and is listed on the National Register of Historic Places.

Porter Farm had been selected by the community to participate in the project, with $1000 set aside to cover potential losses. Knapp worked with Walter Porter to set aside 70 acres (28 ha) of the farm, on which the experimental use of fertilizers on some plots and rotation with nitrogen-fixing legumes doubled normal yields of cotton. The success of this project led to the creation of government Extension Service programs, which went on to develop methods to combat boll weevil infestation in the area.

The Porter Farm is located about 2 miles (3.2 km) north of Terrell, on FM986. The total farm property was historically about 500 acres (200 ha). The property includes the Porter homestead, a 1-1/2 story Cape style frame house located on the southeast side of FM986, while the demonstration land is mainly on the northwest side. Today a tomato barn, which is not historically significant, stands on that land.

== See also ==
- National Register of Historic Places listings in Kaufman County, Texas
- List of National Historic Landmarks in Texas
