= National Register of Historic Places listings in Wichita County, Texas =

Location of Wichita County in Texas

Wichita County, Texas, has three districts and ten individual properties listed on the National Register of Historic Places. One district includes a State Antiquities Landmark and a Recorded Texas Historic Landmark. Four other individual properties are also Recorded Texas Historic Landmarks.

This National Park Service list is complete through NPS recent listings posted August 28, 2026.

== Current listings ==
The locations of National Register properties and districts may be seen in a mapping service provided.

	Name on the Register	Image	Date listed	Location	City or town	Description
1	American Trust Building-Holiday Inn	American Trust Building-Holiday Inn	August 9, 2022 (#100008026)	726 Scott Ave. 33°54′43″N 98°29′33″W	Wichita Falls	
2	Bailey-Moline-Filgo Building		September 4, 2020 (#100005538)	1000-1004 Indiana Ave. 33°54′37″N 98°29′21″W	Wichita Falls	
3	Beaver Creek Bridge	Beaver Creek Bridge	October 10, 1996 (#96001104)	FM 2326, 1 mi (1.6 km) W of jct. with TX 25; 33°54′21″N 98°54′17″W	Electra	
4	Depot Square Historic District	Depot Square Historic District	February 4, 2004 (#03001552)	Roughly bounded by 8th St., Indiana St., 5th St. and MKT Railroad tracks 33°54′58″N 98°29′26″W	Wichita Falls	Includes State Antiquities Landmark, Recorded Texas Historic Landmark
5	First Wichita National Bank		October 31, 2023 (#100009496)	719 Scott Ave. 33°54′45″N 98°29′33″W	Wichita Falls	
6	W.A. Freear Furniture Company - Maskat Shrine Temple Building		July 23, 2018 (#100002701)	1100 Lamar St. 33°54′29″N 98°29′28″W	Wichita Falls	
7	William Benjamin Hamilton House	William Benjamin Hamilton House	October 28, 1983 (#83003826)	1106 Brook Ave. 33°54′02″N 98°30′13″W	Wichita Falls	
8	Hodges-Hardy-Chambers House	Hodges-Hardy-Chambers House	May 2, 1985 (#85000925)	1100 Travis St. 33°54′26″N 98°28′12″W	Wichita Falls	Recorded Texas Historic Landmark
9	Indiana Avenue Historic District		January 30, 2023 (#100008585)	900-1008 Indiana Ave. 33°54′39″N 98°29′22″W	Wichita Falls	
10	Frank Kell House	Frank Kell House	November 28, 1978 (#78003378)	900 Bluff St. 33°54′27″N 98°29′49″W	Wichita Falls	Recorded Texas Historic Landmark; 1909 Neoclassical Revival-style home of Frank Kell, one of Wichita Falls' founding fathers
11	Morningside Historic District	Morningside Historic District	May 16, 1985 (#85001122)	Roughly bounded by 9th St., Morningside Dr., Pembroke Lane and Buchanan St. 33°54′21″N 98°31′23″W	Wichita Falls	
12	Joe and Lois Perkins House	Joe and Lois Perkins House	June 8, 2015 (#15000339)	3301 Harrison Street; 33°52′44″N 98°30′45″W	Wichita Falls	Recorded Texas Historic Landmark
13	Weeks House		December 3, 1980 (#80004158)	2112 Kell Boulevard; 33°53′29″N 98°30′48″W	Wichita Falls	Recorded Texas Historic Landmark
14	Wichita Falls Route Building	Wichita Falls Route Building	November 29, 1978 (#78002999)	503 8th St. 33°54′48″N 98°29′20″W	Wichita Falls	State Antiquities Landmark; part of Depot Square Historic District

== See also ==
- National Register of Historic Places listings in Texas
- Recorded Texas Historic Landmarks in Wichita County
