= Texas Hall, Old Trinity University =

- U.S. National Register of Historic Places
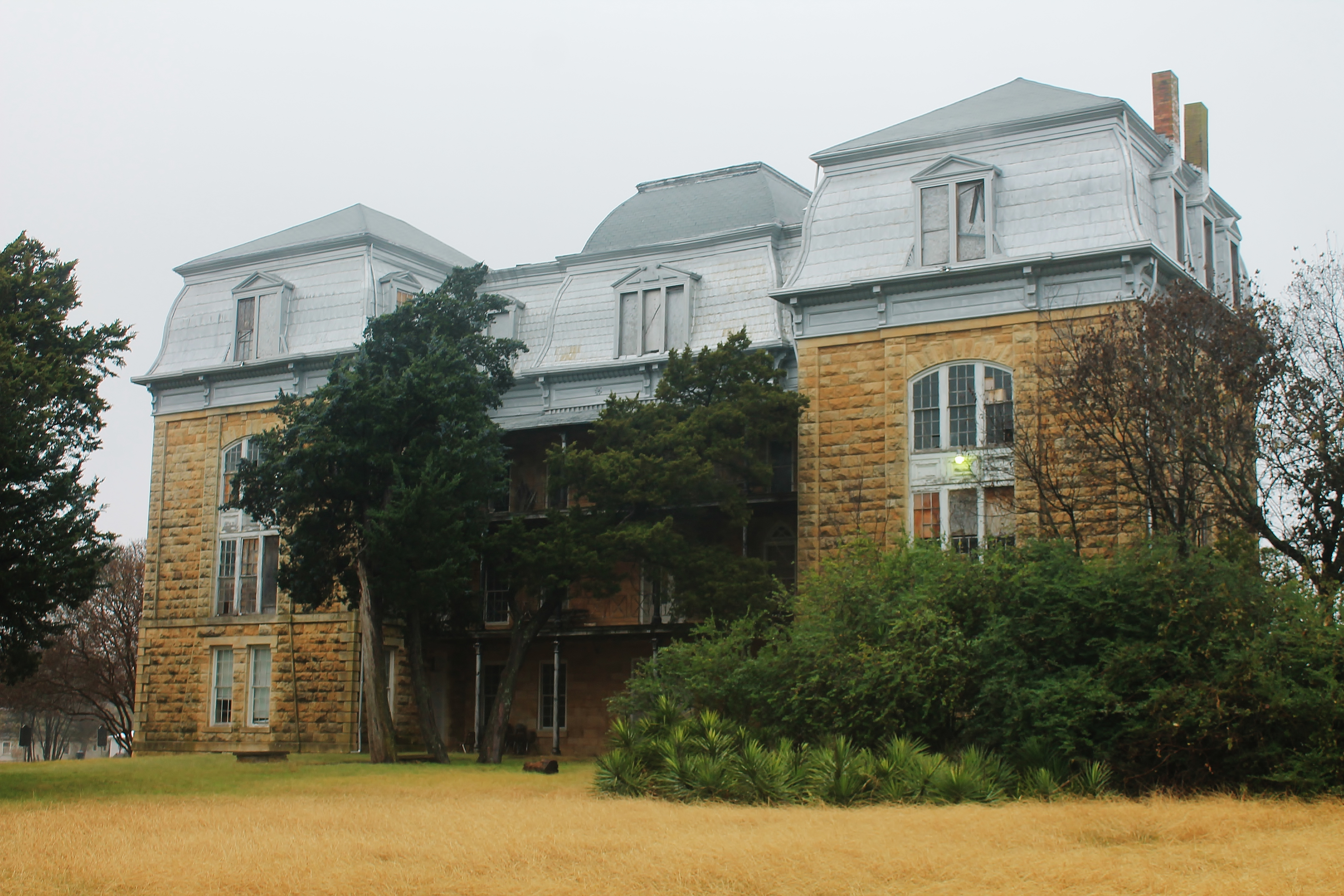
- Texas Hall in 2013

- Location within Texas Location within the United States
- Location: College and Westminster Sts., Tehuacana, Texas
- Coordinates: 31°44′38″N 96°32′43″W
- Area: 2 acres (0.81 ha)
- Built: 1871
- Architectural style: Second Empire
- NRHP reference No.: 78002971
- Added to NRHP: July 12, 1978

Texas Hall is a historic building on the former campus of Trinity University in Tehuacana, Texas, U.S.. The land was donated by John Boyd. It was first designed in the Gothic Revival style by Joseph Schuster, and completed in 1871. It was subsequently redesigned by architect James E. Flanders in the Second Empire style between 1886 and 1892. Trinity University relocated to Waxahachie, Texas in 1902, and Westminster College moved into the building, up until 1942. The building is now known as the Trinity Institute.

The building has been listed on the National Register of Historic Places since July 12, 1978.

== See also ==
- National Register of Historic Places listings in Limestone County, Texas
