= James E. Flanders =

American architect

- Born: James Edward Flanders c. 1849
- Died: 1928; Hollywood, California, U.S.
- Occupation: Architect
- Spouse: Mary Stafford
- Children: 4

James Edward Flanders (c. 1849 – 1928) was an American architect. He designed houses, courthouses and Masonic buildings in Texas, many of which are listed on the National Register of Historic Places.

== Early life ==
James Edward Flanders was born circa 1849.

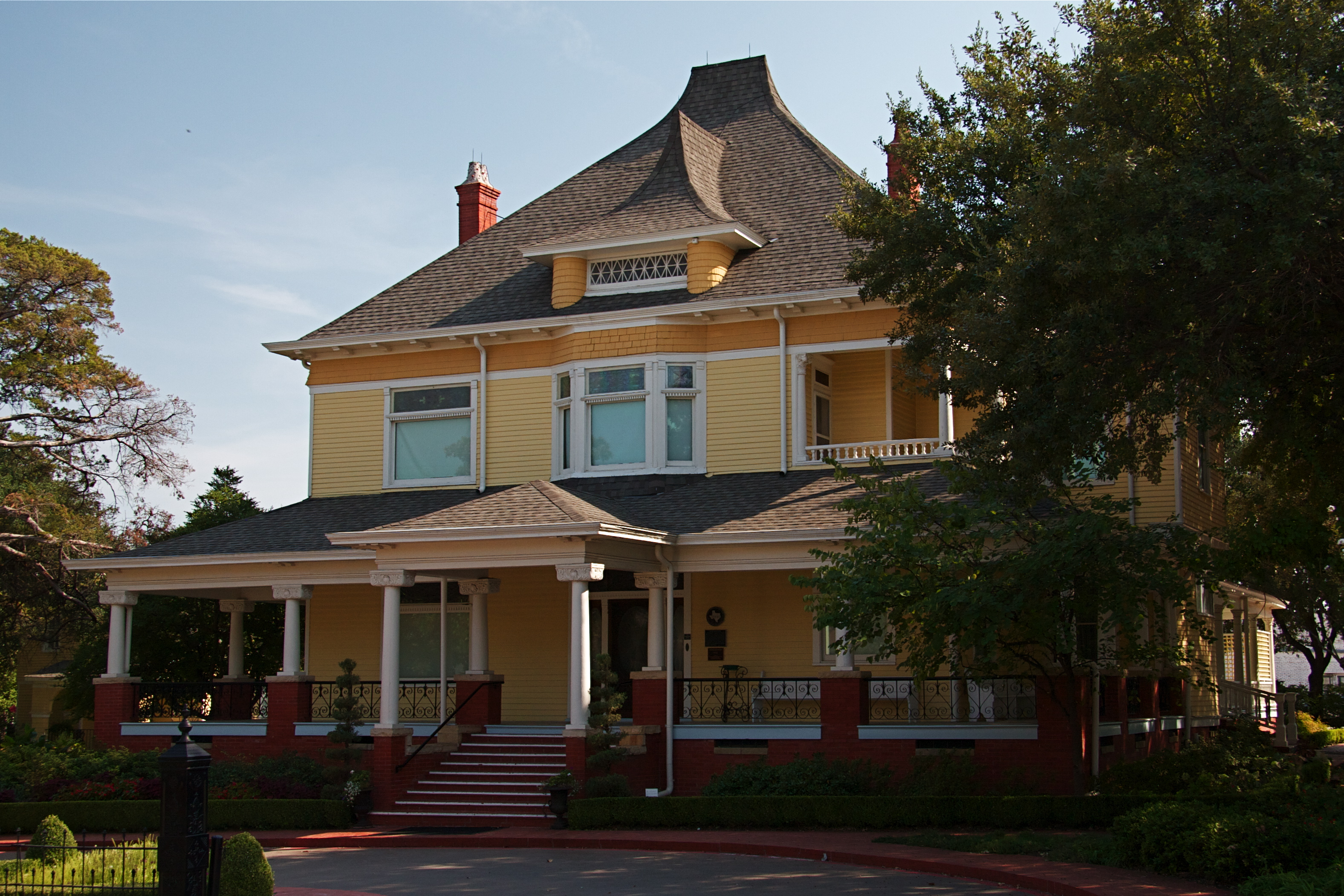
The Heard-Craig House, designed by Flanders.

== Career ==
Flanders began his career in Chicago shortly after the Great Chicago Fire in the early 1870s. By 1875, he moved to Minneapolis, Minnesota. He moved to Dallas, Texas in 1876, and to San Diego, California in 1887. Most of his architectural work is in Texas.

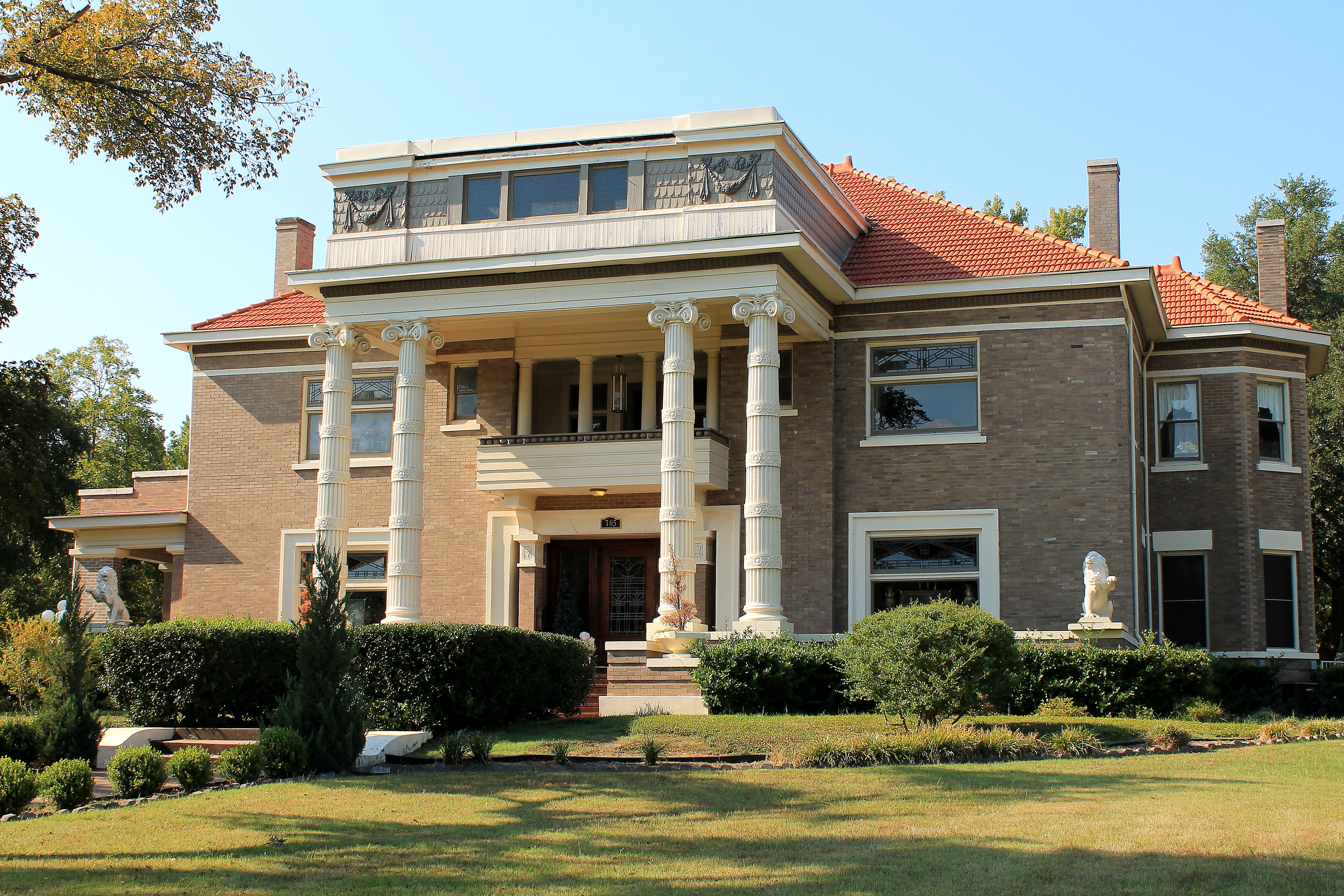
The Warren-Cromwell House, designed by Flanders.

Between 1886 and 1892, Flanders redesigned Texas Hall on the old campus of Trinity University in the Second Empire architectural style.

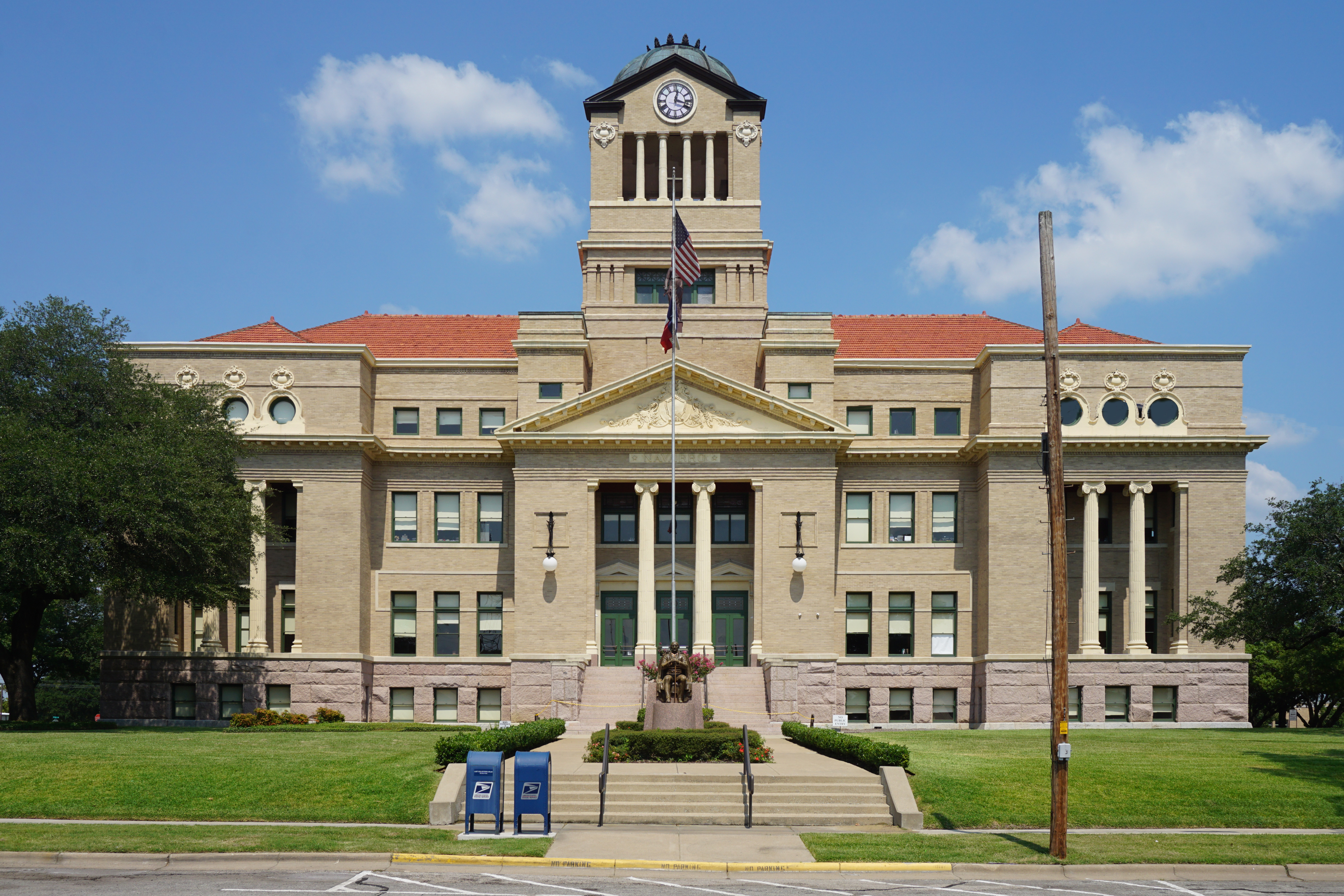
The Navarro County Courthouse, designed by Flanders.

Flanders designed houses like the Heard-Craig House in McKinney, Texas in 1900, which was listed on the National Register of Historic Places in 1987, or the Warren-Crowell House in Terrell, Texas in 1903, listed on the National Register of Historic Places in 1980.

Flanders designed several state courthouses like the Shackelford County Courthouse and the Navarro County Courthouse, both listed on the NRHP.

Flanders designed two buildings associated with the Freemasonry: the Grand Lodge Temple in Waco, Texas in 1904, and the Masonic Widows and Orphans Home in Fort Worth, Texas in 1906.

== Death ==
Flanders married Mary Stafford; they had four children. He was a Scottish Rite Freemason.

Flanders died in 1928 in Hollywood, California.
