= Beaver Creek (Wichita River tributary) =

Physical characteristics
- Source
  - location: Foard County, Texas
  - coordinates: 33°58′N 99°50′W
- Mouth
  - location: Wichita River
  - coordinates: 33°53′N 98°49′W

Beaver Creek (Wichita River) is a river in Texas.

The waterway originates in western Foard County, five miles west of Crowell, and runs to the southeast for ninety miles, into Wilbarger County and then Wichita County, with its mouth at the Wichita River. Dams in Wilbarger County created both Santa Rosa Lake and Lake Electra. Middle Beaver Creek and South Beaver Creek are tributaries.

It was first named Rio Eutaw or Utah.

== See also ==
- Beaver Creek Bridge (Electra, Texas)
- List of rivers of Texas
