= Matthew Cartwright House (Terrell, Texas) =

- U.S. National Register of Historic Places
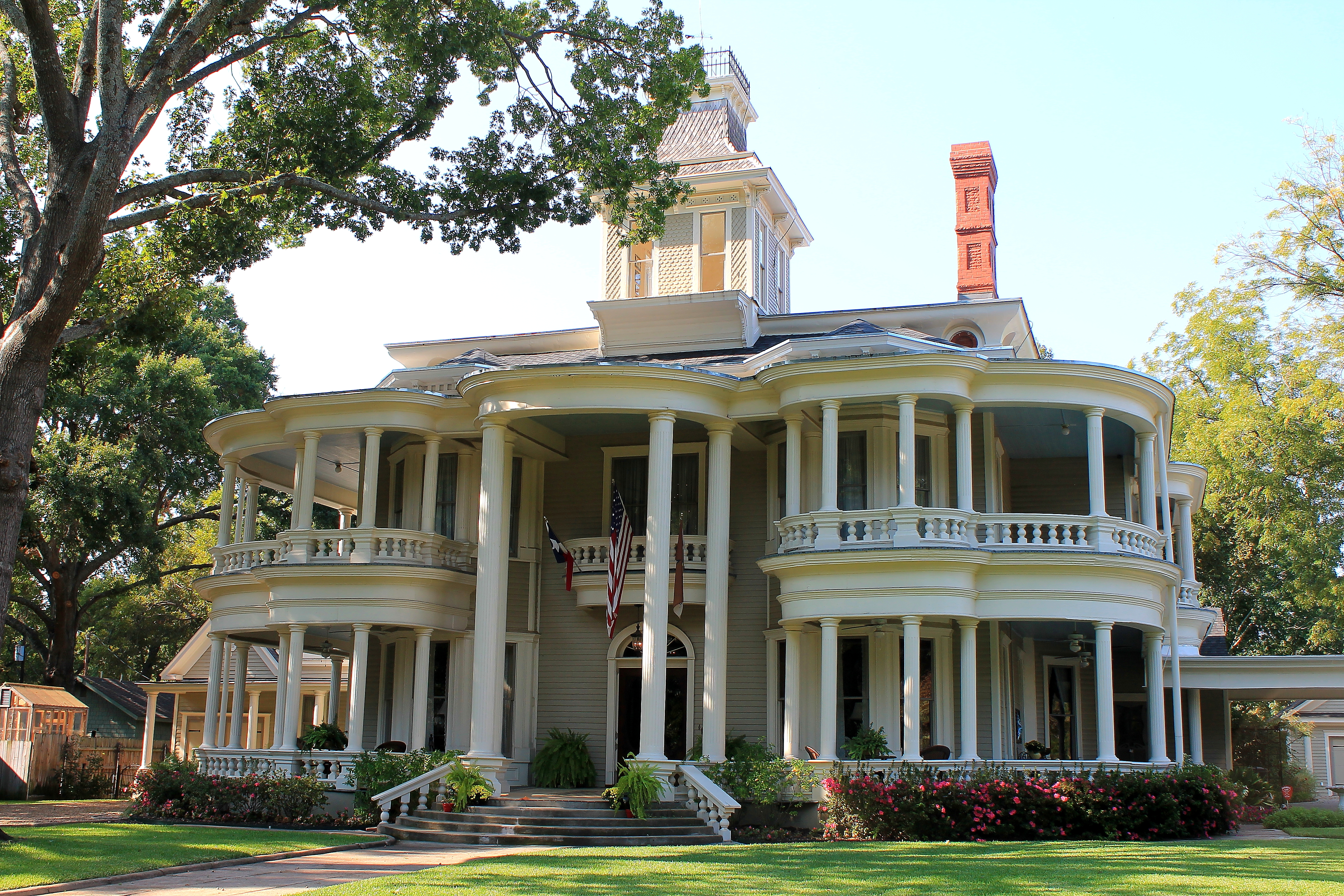
- The house in 2012

- Location within Texas Location within the United States
- Location: 505 Griffith Avenue, Terrell, Texas
- Coordinates: 32°44′44″N 96°17′04″W
- Area: 2.2 acres (0.89 ha)
- Built: 1883
- NRHP reference No.: 79002988
- Added to NRHP: April 4, 1979

The Matthew Cartwright House is a historic house in Terrell, Texas. It was built in 1882-1883 for Matthew Cartwright, a rancher and banker. It has been listed on the National Register of Historic Places since April 4, 1979.
