= Almeda Road Bridge over Brays Bayou =

- U.S. National Register of Historic Places
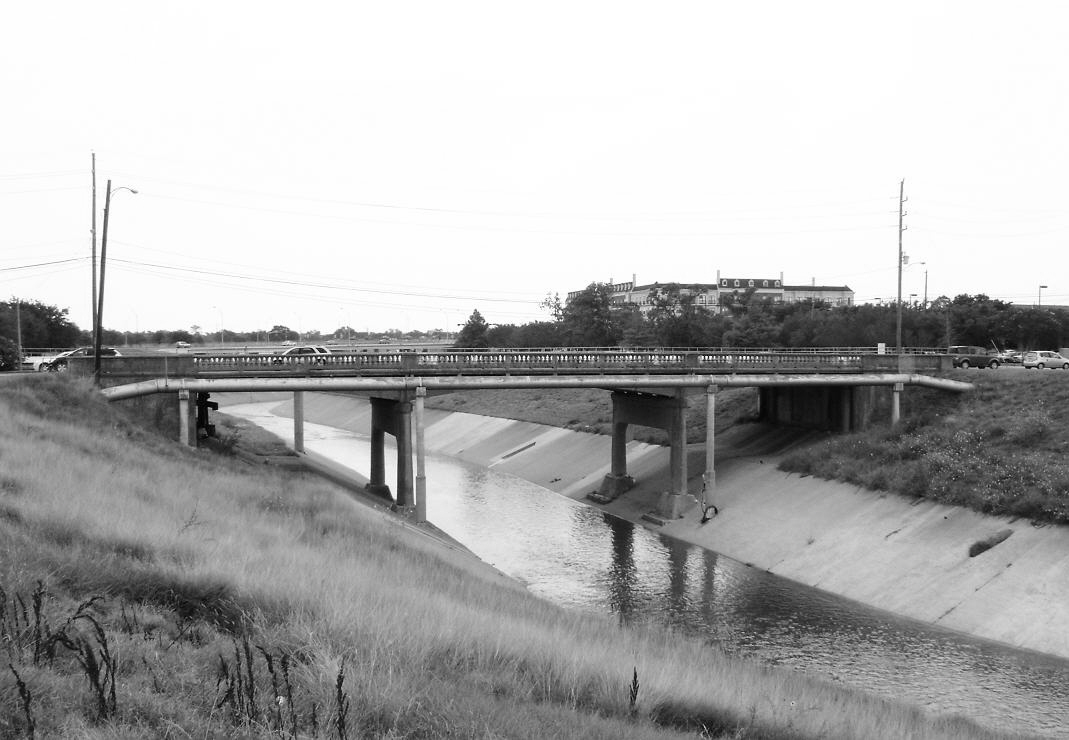
- Almeda Road Bridge over Brays Bayou in 2009

- Location within Texas Location within the United States
- Location: Almeda Rd. at Brays Bayou, Houston, Texas
- Coordinates: 29°42′52″N 95°22′56″W
- Area: 0.1 acres (0.040 ha)
- Built: 1931
- Architect: McKenzie, J.G.; Hall, Don
- Architectural style: Continuous span concrete
- MPS: Historic Bridges of Texas MPS
- NRHP reference No.: 07001234
- Added to NRHP: November 29, 2007

The Almeda Road Bridge over Brays Bayou is a bridge located in Houston, Texas and listed on the National Register of Historic Places. The bridge was designed by J. G. McKenzie and Don Hall Constructors and is one of the last continuous span concrete girder bridges to be designed during the City Beautiful movement.

== See also ==
- National Register of Historic Places listings in Harris County, Texas
