= San Jacinto Street Bridge over Buffalo Bayou =

Historic bridge in Houston, Texas, U.S.

- San Jacinto Street Bridge
- U.S. National Register of Historic Places
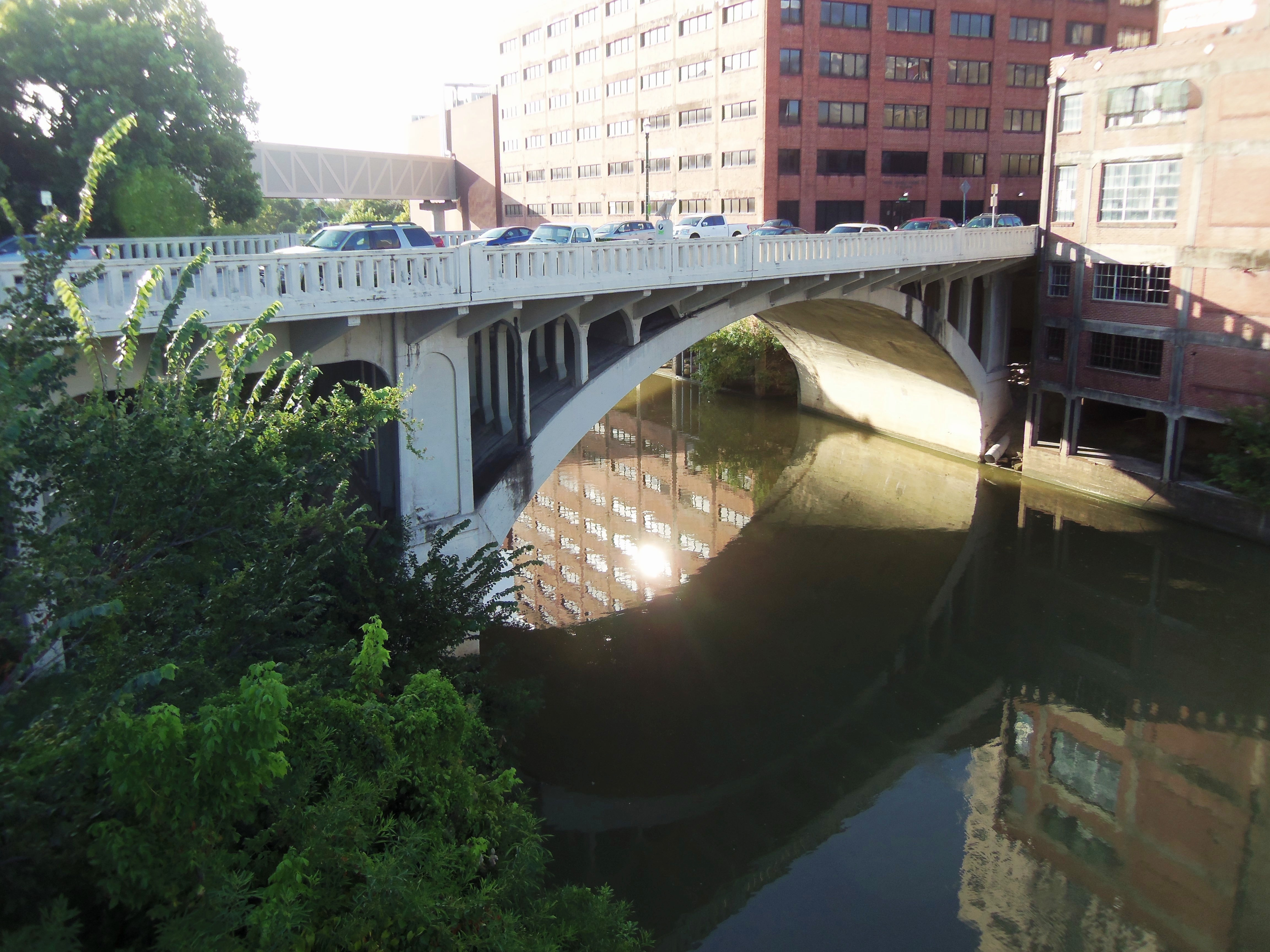
- View from the south bank of Buffalo Bayou

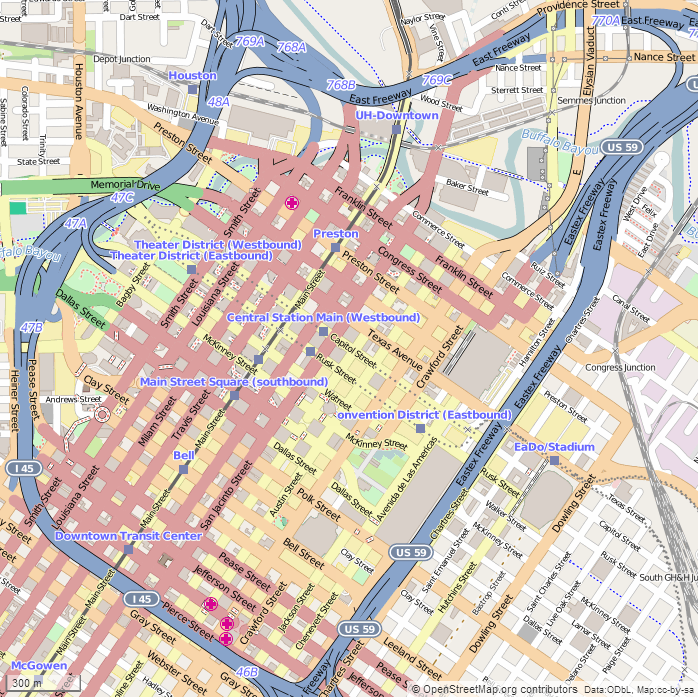
- Location within Houston Downtown Location within Texas Location within the United States
- Location: San Jacinto and Willow streets, Houston, Texas
- Coordinates: 29.763325°N 95.357487°W
- Area: less than one acre
- Built: 1914
- Built by: William P. Carmichael Company
- Architect: E. E. Sands
- Architectural style: City Beautiful
- MPS: Historic Bridges of Texas MPS
- NRHP reference No.: 07001098
- Added to NRHP: October 2007

The San Jacinto Street Bridge is a viaduct which crosses Buffalo Bayou in Houston, Texas. The structure is listed on the National Register of Historic Places (NRHP). This bridge was built in 1914 to replace an iron pivot bridge of 1883 origin, and rehabilitated in 1997. It is a transportation conduit connecting downtown and the historical Fifth Ward.

== History ==
San Jacinto Street has its origins in the founding of Houston. It was designated as a street in the original plat of Houston from October 1836. Houston constructed its first bridge spanning Buffalo Bayou on San Jacinto in 1883. This conveyed traffic to downtown from the Fifth Ward, where many working-class people lived. Houston's wharf at the foot of Main Street still received and dispatched ships, so any bridge at San Jacinto needed to allow their passage. This first viaduct was made of iron and pivoted on a pedestal installed on Buffalo Bayou's northern bank.

Houston constructed a new bridge on San Jacinto in 1914. The area just north from downtown, the Fifth Ward, was a burgeoning industrial area separated from downtown by Buffalo Bayou. Mayor Horace Baldwin Rice was an advocate of the City Beautiful movement, thus was motivated by aesthetic considerations in choosing a bridge design. The new bridge facilitated river traffic with a large “barrel arch ring,” which also contributed to the bridge's appearance and its application of City Beautiful principles. William P. Carmichael Company of St. Louis executed the design of E. E. Sands, an engineer working for the City of Houston. They used reinforced concrete for most of the bridge elements, while pedestrians accessing the bridge walked among the “sidewalk brackets, curved fascia walls and urn balustrade railings.” The “open spandrel concrete arch” is a representative design feature of bridges built during this period, and there were 23 such bridges in Texas still extant in 2007. The bridge spans 325 feet and is in part supported by twenty-foot pilings. A fifty-foot roadbed is flanked by ten-foot cantilevered sidewalks.

The San Jacinto Street Bridge was rehabilitated in 1997. Major design features such as the open spandrel arch were retained. The decking was replaced with new reinforced concrete. The original railings with oval apertures were recast with a new concrete balustrade with rectangular openings.
