= Cummins Creek Bridge =

Historic iron bridge in Texas, U.S.

- U.S. National Register of Historic Places
- Texas State Antiquities Landmark
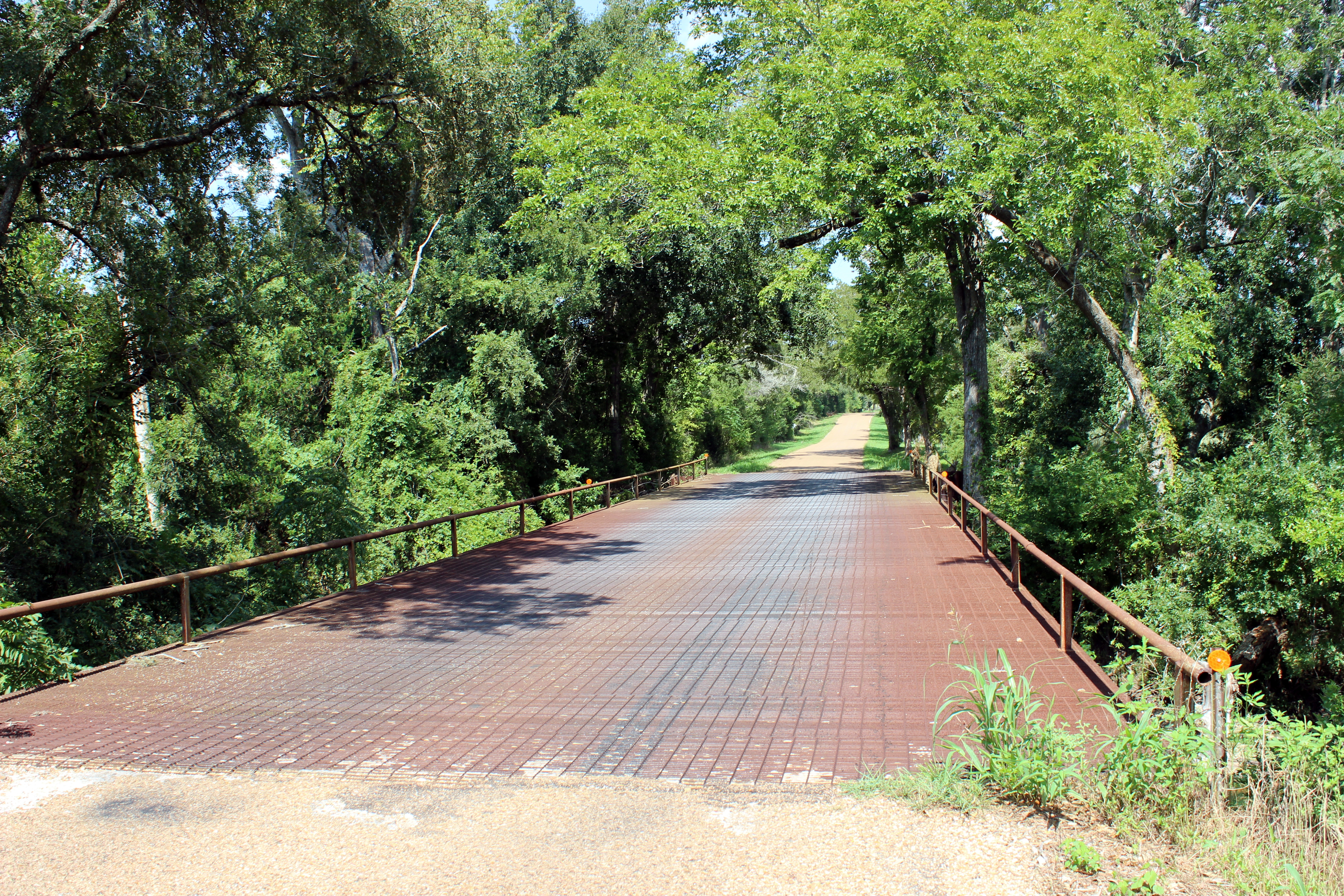
- New (1996) bridge over Cummins Creek northwest of Round Top, Texas

- Location within Texas Location within the United States
- Nearest city: Round Top, Texas
- Coordinates: 30°04′07″N 96°43′09″W
- Built: 1890
- Built by: King Iron Bridge Company
- Engineer: S.A. Oliver
- Architectural style: Pratt truss
- NRHP reference No.: 75001975

Significant dates
- Added to NRHP: 21 April 1975
- Designated TSAL: 1 Jan 1981

The Cummings Creek Bridge was a historic iron bridge about 2 miles (3.2 km) northwest of Round Top, Texas. It was fabricated by the King Iron Bridge Company of Cleveland, Ohio. It was erected in situ by the bridge company's agent S.A. Oliver in 1890. It was listed on the National Register of Historic Places on April 21, 1975, and designated a Texas State Antiquities Landmark by the Texas Historical Commission on January 1, 1981.

It was an example of a 19th-century through truss bridge. The single span bridge covered 110 feet (34 m) with each Pratt truss having 8 panels. Signage atop the north end identifies the builder and year of manufacture.
