= State Highway 34 Bridge at the Trinity River =

- U.S. National Register of Historic Places
- Location within Texas
- Nearest city: Rosser, Texas
- Coordinates: 32°25′36″N 96°27′45″W
- Area: less than one acre
- Built: 1933-34
- Built by: Petroleum Iron Works Co. Austin Bridge Co.
- Architect: Texas Highway Department
- Architectural style: Parker through truss bridge
- MPS: Historic Bridges of Texas MPS
- NRHP reference No.: 96001109
- Added to NRHP: October 10, 1996

The State Highway 34 Bridge at the Trinity River near Rosser, Texas was built in 1933–34. It brought State Highway 34 across the Trinity River, between Ellis County, Texas and Kaufman County, Texas.

The bridge was designed by the Texas Highway Department; the main truss was the Texas Highway Department's T22-150 standard design. The truss fabricator was Petroleum Iron Works Co. and the bridge builder was the Austin Bridge Co.

The main span was a 150 feet (46 m) riveted Parker through truss; there were 53 smaller I-beam spans. Also two additional structures, included in the listing, spanned "borrow pits" outside the levees of the Trinity River.

The bridge was replaced in 1996.
