= Moore's Crossing Historic District =

Historic district in Texas, United States

- U.S. National Register of Historic Places
- U.S. Historic district
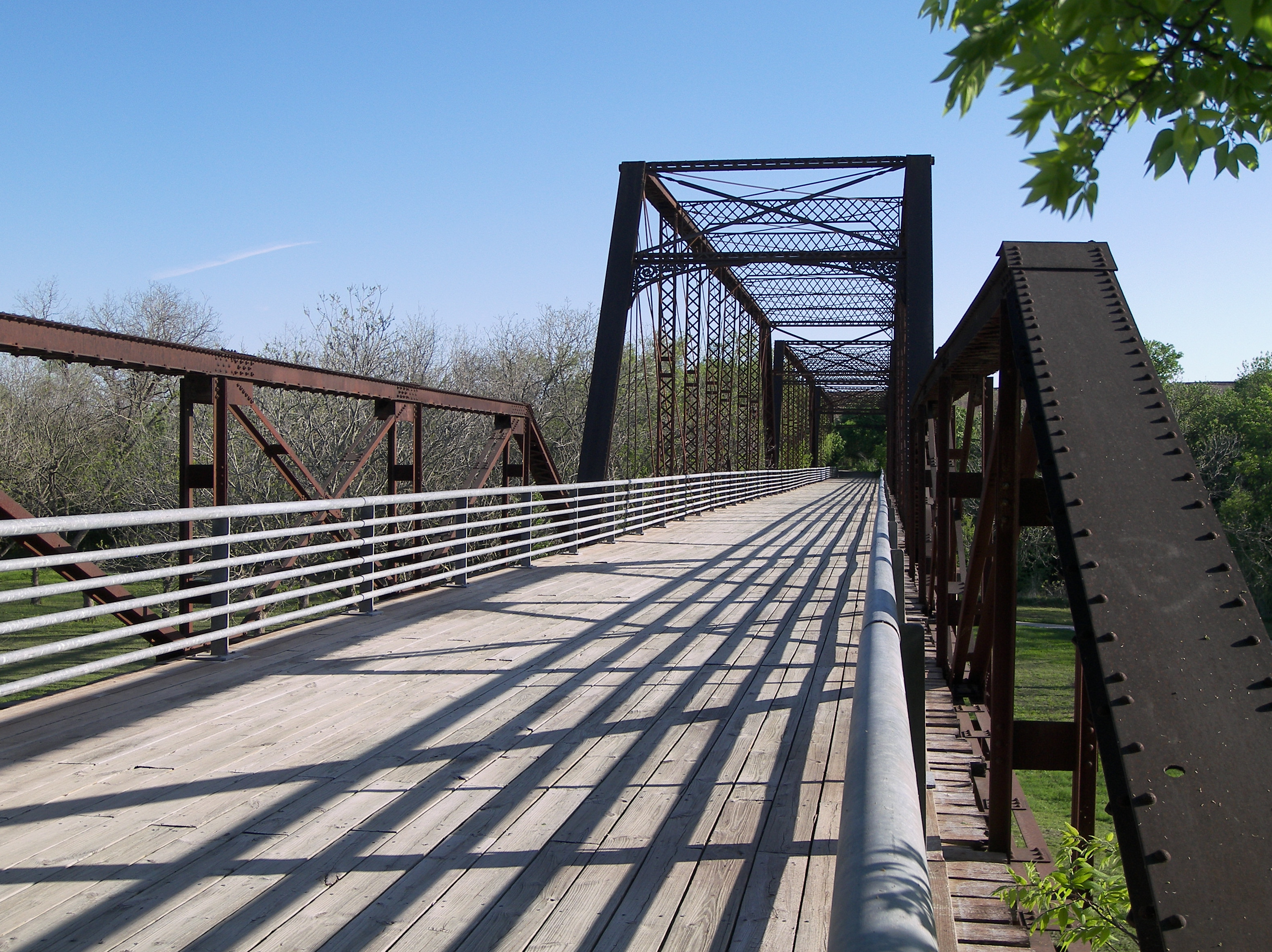
- The bridge at Moore's Crossing
- Location: SE of Austin, Texas USA roughly bounded by FM 973, Moores Bridge Road and Onion Creek.
- Coordinates: 30°10′5″N 97°39′42″W
- Area: 305 acres (123 ha)
- Built: 1871
- MPS: Southeast Travis County MPS
- NRHP reference No.: 96001091
- Added to NRHP: October 16, 1996

Moore's Crossing Historic District is a community located in rural Travis County nine miles southeast of Austin, Texas near the Austin–Bergstrom International Airport.

The location was used as a low-water crossing of Onion Creek as early as the 1840s but did not receive its current name until the early 1900s, when John B. Moore built a store in the area. Moore's Crossing was added to the National Register of Historic Places on October 16, 1996

== Description and significance ==
The southeastern quadrant of what is now Travis County was the first part of the county Europeans settled after the Spanish (and later Mexican) government opened Texas lands to colonists in the 1820s. Watered by the Colorado River, the region's rich black land promised much greater agricultural potential than the rocky hills to the west. Its first residents were farmers who plowed fields and built modest homes along the rivers and creeks that ran through the area. Despite the designation and subsequent growth of nearby Austin as the state capital and county seat, southeast Travis County remained largely an agricultural region until the construction of Bergstrom Air Force Base in 1942, during World War II. Population growth in 1990s and the opening of ABIA in 1999 was followed by commercial development along Texas State Highway 71.

In 1915, three of six spans from the 1884 iron Congress Avenue Bridge, which had been put into storage in 1910, were used to construct a bridge at Moore's Crossing (formerly Onion Creek Bridge). The bridge was washed away by a spring flood that year. The current bridge, built by the Austin Bridge Company of Dallas is made of concrete piers and the remaining three spans from the Congress Avenue Bridge. It was completed in 1922 and took Burleson Road across Onion Creek to Farm to Market Road 973.

On January 8, 1980, the bridge was "finally put to rest" after nearly 97 years. Richard Moya, Travis County Commissioner Precinct 4, stated the bridge would be closed to automobile traffic due to risk of structural failure. The estimate to stabilize the one-lane bridge for traffic was $750,000 and that did not include widening it to support the increased traffic caused by area growth. A four-lane concrete beam bridge with a different alignment to Farm to Market Road 973 was built instead. The county barricaded the bridge at Moore's Crossing and turned it into a pedestrian bridge.

The bridge at Moore's Crossing was registered as a Historic Landmark in 1980 by the Texas Historical Commission. The community itself was added to the National Register of Historic Places on October 16, 1996.

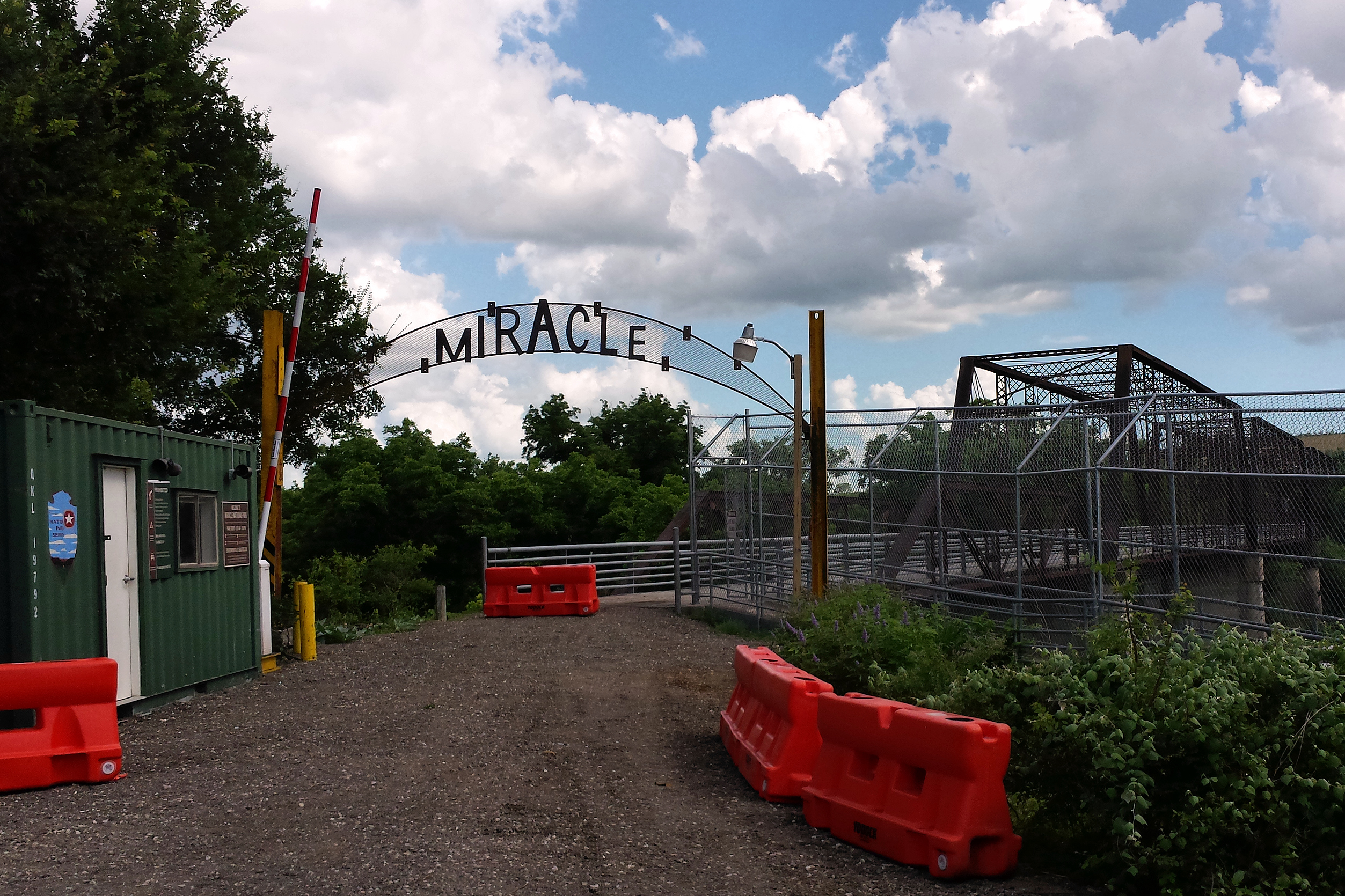
The bridge decorated for production of "The Leftovers"

== In television ==
Warner Bros. Television used the Moore's Crossing Bridge and the park beneath it as a location for season 2 of The Leftovers, which airs on HBO. Production at the location occurred between April and October 2015.
