= Regency, Texas =

- Unincorporated community
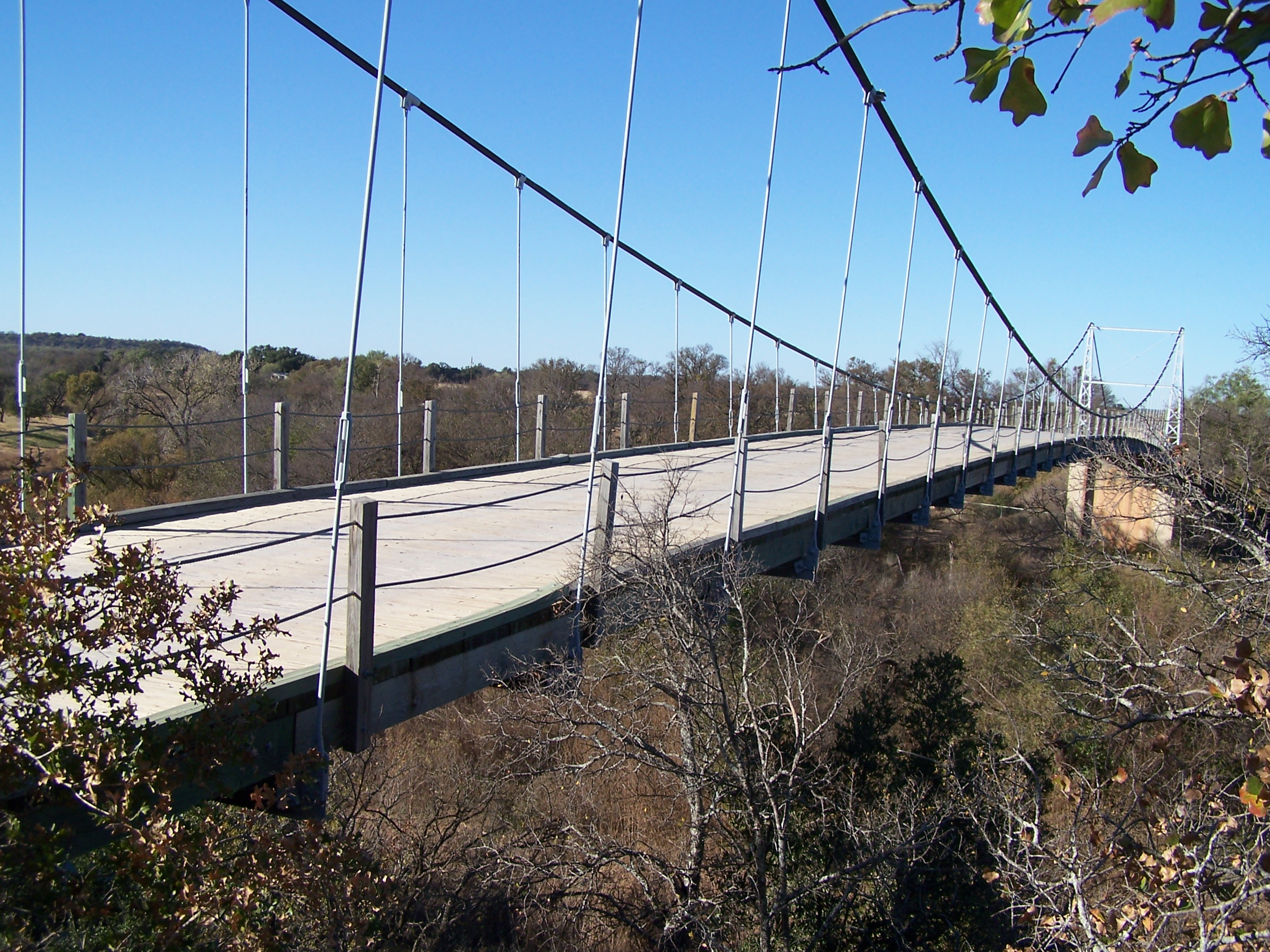
- Side view of Regency Bridge from 2005.

- Location within Texas Location within the United States
- Coordinates: 31°25′14″N 98°51′03″W
- Country: United States
- State: Texas
- County: Mills
- Elevation: 1,250 ft (380 m)
- Time zone: UTC-6 (Central (CST))
  - Summer (DST): UTC-5 (CDT)
- Area code: 325
- GNIS feature ID: 1380430

Regency is an unincorporated community in Mills County, located in the U.S. state of Texas. According to the Handbook of Texas, the community had a population of 25 in 2000.

== History ==
Regency is home to the Regency Bridge, a suspension bridge traveling over the Colorado River between Mills and San Saba counties. It is listed on the National Register of Historic Places.

== Education ==
Today, the community is served by the Mullin Independent School District.
