= List of Farm to Market Roads in Texas (2000–2099) =

- Texas Farm to Market Road and Ranch to Market Road markers

Highway names
- Interstates: Interstate Highway X (IH-X, I-X)
- US Highways: U.S. Highway X (US X)
- State: State Highway X (SH X)
- Loops: Loop X
- Spurs: Spur X
- Recreational: Recreational Road X (RE X)
- Farm or Ranch to Market Roads: Farm to Market Road X (FM X); Ranch to Market Road X (RM X)
- Park Roads: Park Road X (PR X)

System links
- Highways in Texas; Interstate; US; State; Former; Toll; Loops; Spurs; FM/RM; Park; Rec

Farm to Market Roads in Texas are owned and maintained by the Texas Department of Transportation (TxDOT).

== FM 2000 ==
Farm to Market Road 2000
- Location: Burleson County
- Length: 12.929 mi (20.807 km)
- Existed: December 17, 1952–present

Farm to Market Road 2000 (FM 2000) is located in Burleson County.

FM 2000 begins at an intersection with SH 21 just outside of Caldwell. The highway runs in a mostly northern direction before turning into FM 1362 at an intersection with County Road 336.

FM 2000 was designated on December 17, 1952, running from SH 21 northward to a point at a distance of 4.2 miles (6.8 km). The highway was extended further north to the community of Hix on May 6, 1964. FM 2000 was extended to its current northern terminus at FM 1362 on September 5, 1973.

== FM 2001 ==
Farm to Market Road 2001
- Location: Hays and Caldwell counties
- Length: 18.823 mi (Note: The certified length given is shorter than the actual mileage, as the TxDOT description of FM 2001 considers it to be discontinuous at rather than concurrent with SH 21.) (30.293 km)
- Existed: December 17, 1952–present

Farm to Market Road 2001 (FM 2001) is located in Hays and Caldwell counties.

FM 2001 begins at an intersection with US 183 in Lockhart. The highway runs in a western direction along Silent Valley Road and leaves the town after the SH 130 junction. The highway runs through rural farm land before entering the town of Niederwald, where it has an overlap with SH 21. After FM 2001 leaves the overlap with SH 21 it crosses into Hays County and passes by rural subdivisions. The highway makes a few near 90 degree turns before entering Buda, where the road ends at I-35.

FM 2001 was designated on December 17, 1952, running from US 81 (now I-35) to SH 21. The highway was extended south past SH 21 to SH 142 near Lockhart on November 21, 1956. FM 2001's southern terminus was relocated to US 183 on February 28, 1957. On March 28, 2024, FM 2001 was rerouted on a straighter path east of I-35, and the old route was redesignated as FM Spur 2001.

Junction list

County	Location	mi	km	Destinations	Notes
Caldwell	Lockhart	0.0	0.0	US 183 – Lockhart, Austin	
Caldwell	Lockhart	1.8	2.9	SH 130 Toll – Seguin, Austin	SH 130 exit 474 / 471
Caldwell	Niederwald	9.9	15.9	SH 21 west – San Marcos	South end of SH 21 overlap
Hays	Niederwald	11.3	18.2	SH 21 east – Bastrop	North end of SH 21 overlap
Hays	Buda	20.2	32.5	I-35 – San Antonio, Austin	I-35 exit 220
1.000 mi = 1.609 km; 1.000 km = 0.621 mi: Concurrency terminus

== FM 2002 ==
Farm to Market Road 2002
- Location: Martin County
- Length: 17.729 mi (Note: The certified length given is shorter than the actual mileage, as the TxDOT description of FM 2002 considers it to be discontinuous at rather than concurrent with SH 137.) (28.532 km)
- Existed: December 17, 1952–present

Farm to Market Road 2002 (FM 2002) is located in Martin County.

FM 2002 begins at an intersection with FM 829 in a rural area of the county. The highway runs in a slight northeast direction and runs in a slightly southeast direction on the overlap with SH 137. After leaving the overlap, FM 2002 runs in a slight northeast direction, turns southeast at County Roads 3901 / 4700, and turns back northeast at County Road 4600. The highway intersects FM 26 roughly halfway between SH 137 south and Ackerly. FM 2002 runs along the southern border of Ackerly, where it is known locally as Avenue H. The highway ends at an intersection with US 87 just east of the city.

FM 2002 was designated on December 17, 1952, running from FM 1742 east of Flower Grove to Loop near Ackerly. On January 29, 1953, the road was extended west to SH 137 in Flower Grove and east to US 87, replacing segments of FM 1742 (the remainder became FM 26 on April 9, 1953) and Loop 67 (the remainder became part of FM 2212 on April 1, 1954). FM 2002 was extended westward to FM 1718 (now FM 829) on September 29, 1954.

Junction list

The entire route is in Martin County.

Location	mi	km	Destinations	Notes
	0.0	0.0	FM 829 to SH 176 – Patricia	
	6.0	9.7	SH 137 north – Lamesa	West end of SH 137 overlap
	7.0	11.3	SH 137 south – Stanton	East end of SH 137 overlap
	12.0	19.3	FM 26 – Lamesa	
Ackerly	18.0	29.0	FM 2212 – Knott	
	18.7	30.1	US 87 – Lamesa, Big Spring	
1.000 mi = 1.609 km; 1.000 km = 0.621 mi: Concurrency terminus

== FM 2003 ==
Farm to Market Road 2003
- Location: Foard County
- Length: 9.288 mi (14.948 km)
- Existed: December 17, 1952–present

Farm to Market Road 2003 (FM 2003) is located in Foard County.

FM 2003 begins at an intersection with County Roads 365 / 370. The highway mostly runs in an eastern direction and ends at an intersection with SH 6 (formerly SH 283) south of Crowell.

FM 2003 was designated on December 17, 1952, along the current route.

== FM 2004 ==
Farm to Market Road 2004
- Location: Brazoria and Galveston counties
- Length: 46.901 mi (75.480 km)
- Existed: December 17, 1952–present

Farm to Market Road 2004 (FM 2004) is located in Brazoria and Galveston counties. It runs from SH 36 near Jones Creek to SH 3 in Texas City.

== FM 2005 ==
Farm to Market Road 2005
- Location: Mills and Hamilton counties
- Length: 31.25 mi (Note: The certified length given is shorter than the actual mileage, as the TxDOT description of FM 2005 considers it to be discontinuous at rather than concurrent with FM 221.) (50.29 km)
- Existed: December 17, 1952–present

Farm to Market Road 2005 (FM 2005) is located in Mills and Hamilton counties.

FM 2005 begins at an intersection with US 84 near the town of Goldthwaite. The highway travels in a northeast direction and has an overlap with FM 221 near Shive. FM 2005 turns in a more northern direction after the overlap before ending at an intersection with FM 218 near Hamilton.

FM 2005 was designated on December 17, 1952, running southwest from FM 221 near Shive to the Mills County line at a distance of 8.3 miles (13.4 km). The highway was extended 10.5 miles (16.9 km) northeastward to FM 218 on October 28, 1953. FM 2005 was extended 9.9 miles (15.9 km) to FM 575 on September 2, 1955, absorbing FM 2248 in the process. The highway was extended to US 84 on April 25, 1959, absorbing part of FM 575 in the process.

Junction list

County	Location	mi	km	Destinations	Notes
Mills		0.0	0.0	US 84 – Goldthwaite, Gatesville	
Mills		4.7	7.6	FM 575 north – Caradan, Mount Olive	
Hamilton		16.1	25.9	FM 1047 south – Star	
Hamilton		21.5	34.6	FM 221 west – Pottsville	West end of FM 221 overlap
Hamilton		22.4	36.0	FM 221 east – Shive	East end of FM 221 overlap
Hamilton		32.1	51.7	FM 218 – Pottsville, Hamilton	
1.000 mi = 1.609 km; 1.000 km = 0.621 mi: Concurrency terminus

== FM 2006 ==
Farm to Market Road 2006
- Location: Hardeman County
- Length: 16.963 mi (27.299 km)
- Existed: December 17, 1952–present

Farm to Market Road 2006 (FM 2006) is located in Hardeman County.

FM 2006 begins at an intersection with US 287 between Quanah and Chillicothe. The highway travels in a northern direction through highly rural areas of the county and turns east at Lewis Road before turning south at Honeycutt Road. FM 2006 runs in a southern direction and passes by ranch land and turns southeast at Taylor Road and enters Chillicothe, where the highway ends at an intersection with FM 91. The section of FM 2006 between Lewis Road and Honeycutt Road runs within 2 miles (3.2 km) of the Red River.

FM 2006 was designated on December 17, 1952, running from FM 91 to a road intersection at a distance of 4.5 miles (7.2 km). On September 20, 1961, a farm to market road from the end of FM 2006 to the end of FM 2007 was designated. On October 9, 1961, the road was extended 12.8 miles (20.6 km) north, west, and south to US 287, replacing FM 2007.

== FM 2007 ==
Farm to Market Road 2007
- Location: Reeves County
- Length: 7.885 mi (12.690 km)
- Existed: May 2, 1962–present

Farm to Market Road 2007 (FM 2007) is located in southeastern Reeves County. It begins at CR 112, immediately west of the northern end of CR 111, then runs to the north and northeast to US 285, 18 miles (29 km) southeast of Pecos.

FM 2007 was designated on May 2, 1962, along the current route.

=== FM 2007 (1952) ===
Farm to Market Road 2007
- Location: Hardeman County
- Existed: December 17, 1952–October 9, 1961

A previous route numbered FM 2007 was designated in Hardeman County on December 17, 1952, from US 287, 8 miles (13 km) east of Quanah, north 3.4 miles (5.5 km). On August 24, 1954, the route was extended north 1.4 miles (2.3 km). FM 2007 was cancelled on October 9, 1961, and transferred to FM 2006.

== FM 2008 ==
Farm to Market Road 2008
- Location: Garza County
- Length: 11.281 mi (18.155 km)
- Existed: September 21, 1955–present

Farm to Market Road 2008 (FM 2008) is located in Garza County in the South Plains region.

FM 2008 begins at an intersection with US 380 east of Post. The highway travels in a northern direction through rural ranch land with several oil wells before ending at an intersection with FM 651 southwest of Kalgary.

The current FM 2008 was designated on September 21, 1955, running from US 380 northward to Verbena at a distance of 4.7 miles (7.6 km). The highway was extended 7.2 miles (11.6 km) to FM 651 on October 26, 1983.

=== FM 2008 (1952) ===
Farm to Market Road 2008
- Location: Irion County
- Existed: December 17, 1952–November 23, 1954

A previous route numbered FM 2008 was designated on December 17, 1952, from US 67 at Barnhart to a point 5.0 miles (8.0 km) north. On October 28, 1953, the road was extended north 3.0 miles (4.8 km). FM 2009 was cancelled on November 23, 1954, and transferred to FM 379 (now SH 163).

== FM 2009 ==
Farm to Market Road 2009
- Location: Motley County
- Length: 9.034 mi (14.539 km)
- Existed: December 17, 1952–present

Farm to Market Road 2009 (FM 2009) is located in Motley County. The highway connects SH 70 north of Matador to FM 97 near Flomot.

FM 2009 was designated on December 17, 1952, along the current route.

== FM 2010 ==
Farm to Market Road 2010
- Location: Henderson and Van Zandt counties
- Length: 3.622 mi (5.829 km)
- Existed: January 30, 1963–present

Farm to Market Road 2010 (FM 2010) is located in Henderson and Van Zandt counties.

FM 2010 begins at an intersection with FM 315 (Broad Street) in Chandler, just north of SH 31. The highway travels in a predominately northern direction before ending at an intersection with FM 279, just east of Edom.

The current FM 2010 was designated on January 30, 1963, running from SH 31 northwestward to FM 279. The highway's southern terminus was relocated to FM 315 on January 15, 1964.

=== FM 2010 (1952) ===
Farm to Market Road 2010
- Location: Runnels County
- Existed: December 17, 1952–October 28, 1953

The first use of the FM 2010 designation was in Runnels County, from US 83 in Winters east and south 16.0 miles (25.7 km) to FM 53 at Crews. FM 2010 was cancelled on October 28, 1953, and transferred to FM 382 and FM 1770.

=== FM 2010 (1953) ===
Farm to Market Road 2010
- Location: Coryell County
- Existed: October 28, 1953–October 18, 1954

FM 2010 was designated a second time on October 28, 1953, in Coryell County from FM 932 near Purmela northwest 6.9 miles (11.1 km) to the Hamilton County line. FM 2010 was cancelled on October 18, 1954, and became a portion of FM 1241 when it was extended.

=== FM 2010 (1955) ===
Farm to Market Road 2010
- Location: Hockley County
- Existed: September 21, 1955–November 21, 1957

The third time the FM 2010 designation was in Hockley County, from SH 51 (now US 385), 6.3 miles (10.1 km) south of Levelland, east 13.0 miles (20.9 km) to FM 1632 (now FM 168). On November 21, 1956, the road was extended west 6.5 miles (10.5 km) to FM 300 (now FM 303) 3.5 miles (5.6 km) south of Sundown. On October 31, 1957, the road was extended east 7.4 miles (11.9 km) to US 62. FM 2010 was cancelled on November 21, 1957, and transferred to FM 1585.

=== FM 2010 (1958) ===
Farm to Market Road 2010
- Location: Yoakum County
- Existed: October 31, 1958–May 25, 1962

FM 2010 was designated for a fourth time on October 31, 1958, in Yoakum County from US 380 at Bronco to FM 1077 (now US 82). On May 25, 1962, FM 2010 was cancelled and transferred to FM 769.

== FM 2011 ==
Farm to Market Road 2011
- Location: Gregg and Rusk counties
- Length: 10.246 mi (16.489 km)
- Existed: December 17, 1952–present

Farm to Market Road 2011 (FM 2011) runs from FM 1716 near Lake Cherokee northwest to FM 2087 near Kilgore.

FM 2011 was designated on December 17, 1952, from SH 322 southward to FM 782. On October 26, 1954, FM 2011 was extended north to FM 2087. On June 30, 1955, the section of FM 2011 from SH 322 south of the Gregg–Rusk county line to FM 782 (along with FM 2013 from FM 2011 to Chalk Hill) was cancelled in exchange for the creation of the new FM 1716, which connected FM 782 to Chalk Hill. On February 23, 1960, FM 2011 was extended to FM 1716, replacing FM 2606.

Junction list

County	Location	mi	km	Destinations	Notes
Rusk		0.0	0.0	FM 1716	
Gregg		3.7	6.0	SH 322 – Lakeport, Henderson	
Gregg		5.5	8.9	FM 2204 (Stone Road) – Kilgore, Airport	
Gregg		7.5	12.1	FM 349 – Kilgore, Lakeport	
Gregg		10.2	16.4	FM 2087 to I-20 / US 259	
1.000 mi = 1.609 km; 1.000 km = 0.621 mi

== FM 2012 ==
Farm to Market Road 2012
- Location: Gregg and Rusk counties
- Length: 9.12 mi (14.68 km)
- Existed: December 17, 1952–present

Farm to Market Road 2012 (FM 2012) is located in Gregg and Rusk counties. It runs from FM 850 near New London north to SH 31 near Kilgore.

FM 2012 was designated on December 17, 1952, from SH 259 (now SH 42/135) in Laird Hill to SH 135 (now FM 918). On May 2, 1962, FM 2012 was extended south to FM 850. On July 11, 1968, FM 2012 was extended north to SH 31.

County	Location	mi	km	Destinations	Notes
Rusk		0.0	0.0	FM 850 to US 259 – Overton	
Rusk		2.0	3.2	FM 918 to US 259 – Overton	
Rusk	Laird Hill	6.6	10.6	SH 42 / SH 135 – Kilgore, New London	
Gregg		9.1	14.6	SH 31 – Tyler, Kilgore	
1.000 mi = 1.609 km; 1.000 km = 0.621 mi

== FM 2013 ==
Farm to Market Road 2013
- Location: Parmer County
- Length: 23.252 mi (37.420 km)
- Existed: September 21, 1955–present

Farm to Market Road 2013 (FM 2013) is located in Parmer County. It begins at the New Mexico state line near Rhea, as a continuation of NM 19. The highway travels in an eastern direction and turns south at County Road B and turns back east at County Road 5. FM 2013 continues east, intersecting FM 1731. The highway then briefly enters the city of Friona before ending at an intersection with US 60/SH 214.

The current FM 2013 was designated on September 21, 1955, running from FM 1731 to Rhea School at a distance of 5.0 miles (8.0 km). The highway was extended 8.8 miles (14.2 km) to the New Mexico state line on May 2, 1962. FM 2013 was extended to US 60/SH 214 in Friona on September 18, 1996, absorbing part of FM 1731 in the process.

=== FM 2013 (1952) ===
Farm to Market Road 2013
- Location: Rusk County
- Existed: December 17, 1952–June 30, 1955

FM 2013 was originally designated on December 17, 1952, running from FM 2011 at McFadden's Store, eastward to a county road at Chalk Hill at a distance of 3.9 miles (6.3 km). On June 30, 1955, FM 2013 (along with the section of FM 2011 from FM 782 at Oak Hill to SH 322) was removed from the state highway system in exchange for the creation of FM 1716, connecting FM 782 at Oak Hill to a county road at Chalk Hill.

== FM 2014 ==
Farm to Market Road 2014
- Location: Sherman County
- Length: 6.387 mi (10.279 km)
- Existed: December 17, 1952–present

== FM 2015 ==
Farm to Market Road 2015
- Location: Smith County
- Length: 12.007 mi (19.323 km)
- Existed: December 17, 1952–present

Farm to Market Road 2015 is a 12.007-mile (19.323 km) state road in northeastern Smith County that connects US 271 on the extreme northeastern edge of Tyler with FM 14 (south of Hawkins).

== FM 2016 ==
Farm to Market Road 2016
- Location: Smith County
- Length: 1.75 mi (2.82 km)
- Existed: December 17, 1952–present

== FM 2017 ==
Farm to Market Road 2017
- Location: Culberson and Jeff Davis counties
- Length: 9.245 mi (14.878 km)
- Existed: September 27, 1960–present

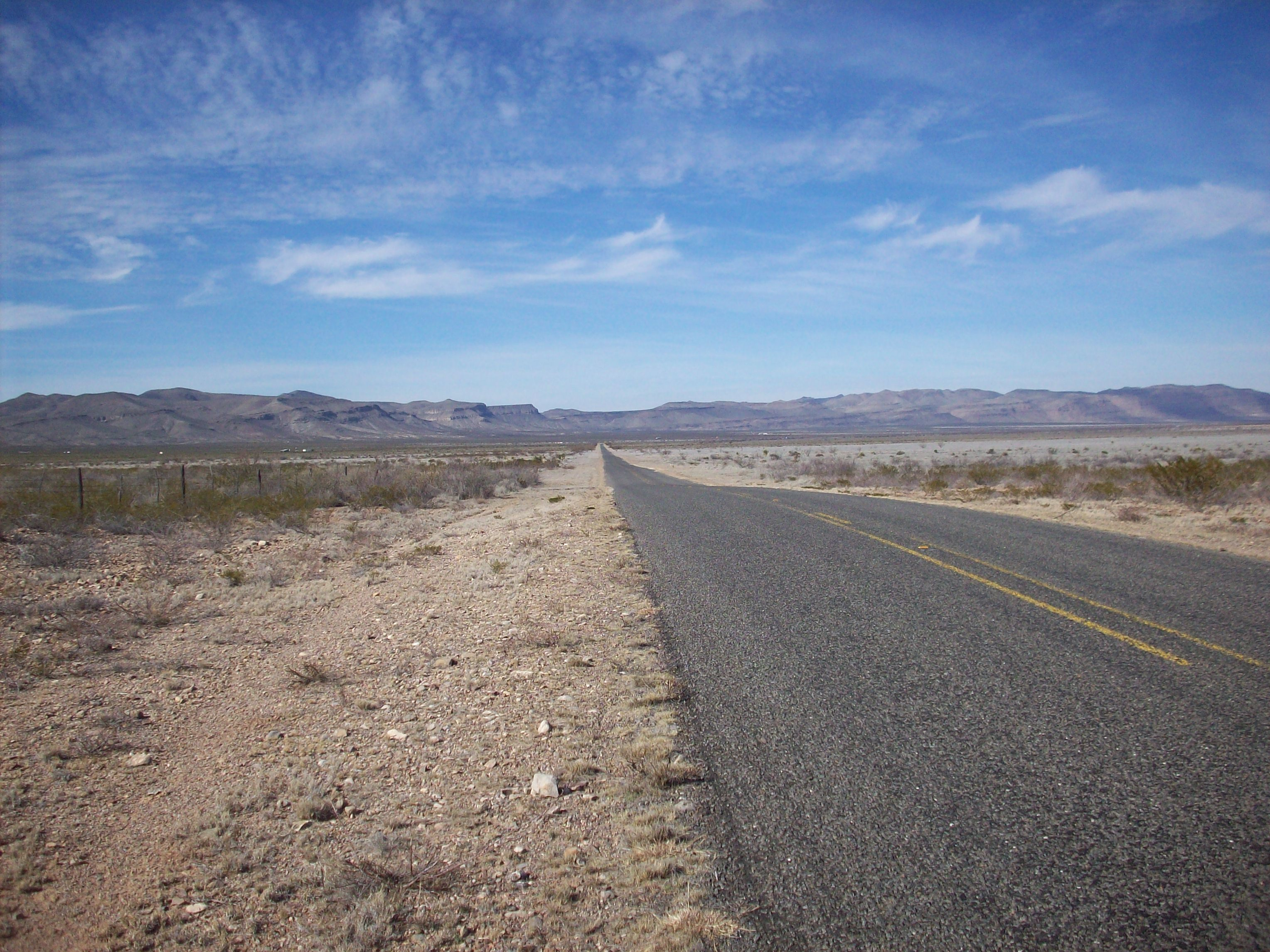
FM 2017 in northwestern Jeff Davis County

Farm to Market Road 2017 (FM 2017) is a 9.2-mile (14.8 km) route connecting FM 1523 in Culberson County and US 90 between Van Horn and Valentine in Jeff Davis County.

FM 2017 follows a road with narrow lanes and grassy shoulders. The route lies within a broad, flat valley between the Sierra Vieja range to the west and the Davis Mountains to the east. The route begins at FM 1523 in Culberson County 2.3 miles (3.7 km) west of US 90 near Lobo. The road enters Jeff Davis County and continues southward 5.8 miles (9.3 km) until it reaches a junction with Chispa Road. At this point the road turns northeast for the remainder of the distance to US 90.

FM 2017 travels primarily through farm and ranch along its length. The road does not pass through any cities or towns, Between its ending points, the only major local road FM 2017 intersects is Chispa Road, a primitive county road that goes to the Rio Grande and follows the river to the northwest terminus of FM 170 at Candelaria in Presidio County. The western terminus of FM 2017 at US 90 is near the Chispa Switch at the location of the former town of Chispa on the Union Pacific Railroad which runs alongside US 90.

FM 2017 was designated on September 27, 1960, along its current route.

=== FM 2017 (1952) ===
Farm to Market Road 2017
- Location: Hansford and Ochiltree counties
- Existed: December 17, 1952–February 16, 1960

A previous route numbered FM 2017 was designated on December 17, 1952, from FM 760, 8.3 miles (13.4 km) south of Spearman east 5.5 miles (8.9 km) to the Ochiltree County line. On October 31, 1957, the road was extended east 1.7 miles (2.7 km) into Ochiltree County. FM 2017 was cancelled on February 16, 1960, and transferred to FM 281 when it was extended.

== FM 2018 ==
Farm to Market Road 2018
- Location: Hansford County
- Length: 16.088 mi (25.891 km)
- Existed: December 17, 1952–present

Farm to Market Road 2018 (FM 2018) is located in Hansford County. It begins at FM 1573 southwest of Gruver and runs east, intersecting SH 136, before ending at SH 15 west of Spearman.

FM 2018 was designated on December 17, 1952, from FM 278 (now SH 136), 4 miles (6.4 km) south of FM 289 (now SH 15), westward 6.2 miles (10.0 km). On October 31, 1958, it was extended west to FM 1573. On June 1, 1965, FM 2018 was extended to its current eastern terminus.

== FM 2019 ==
Farm to Market Road 2019
- Location: Ector County
- Length: 3.015 mi (4.852 km)
- Existed: December 17, 1952–present

Farm to Market Road 2019 (FM 2019) is located in western Ector County. It runs from SH 302 to the S.E. Henderson Ranch property approximately 3.0 miles (4.8 km) to the south.

FM 2019 was designated on December 17, 1952, from SH 302, 1 mile (1.6 km) east of Notrees, south and east 10.2 miles (16.4 km) to SH 302. On May 25, 1954, FM 2019 was shortened by 7.2 miles to a 3-mile route south from SH 302. FM 2019 was extended south 5.3 miles (8.5 km) on June 28, 1963, and another 4.2 miles (6.8 km) south on June 1, 1965, but these extensions were cancelled on July 31, 1975, due to difficulties in acquiring right-of-way.

== FM 2020 ==
Farm to Market Road 2020
- Location: Ector County
- Length: 9.431 mi (15.178 km)
- Existed: December 17, 1952–present

Farm to Market Road 2020 (FM 2020) is located in Ector County. It is locally known as University Boulevard.

FM 2020 begins at an intersection with FM 866 in West Odessa and runs through the town in a slight northeast direction. The highway intersects FM 1936 near the east edge of town. At the junction with SH 302/Loop 338, FM 2020 enters the Odessa city limits. It intersects FM 1882 before ending at Spur 450.

FM 2020 was designated on December 17, 1952, running from FM 866 eastward 7.0 miles (11.3 km) to FM 1936. The highway was extended 2.3 miles (3.7 km) on June 1, 1965, to the then-western city limits of Odessa. On June 27, 1995, the entire route was redesignated Urban Road 2020 (UR 2020). The designation reverted to FM 2020 with the elimination of the Urban Road system on November 15, 2018.

Junction list

The entire route is in Ector County.

Location	mi	km	Destinations	Notes
West Odessa	0.0	0.0	FM 866 to I-20 – Goldsmith	
West Odessa	7.0	11.3	FM 1936 to I-20 / SH 302	
West Odessa–Odessa line	8.9	14.3	SH 302 / Loop 338 to I-20	
Odessa	10.1	16.3	FM 1882 (County Road West)	
Odessa	10.4	16.7	Spur 450 (Kermit Highway)	
1.000 mi = 1.609 km; 1.000 km = 0.621 mi

== FM 2021 ==
Farm to Market Road 2021
- Location: Angelina County
- Length: 12.373 mi (19.912 km)
- Existed: December 17, 1952–present

== FM 2022 ==
Farm to Market Road 2022
- Location: Houston and Anderson counties
- Length: 27.264 mi (43.877 km)
- Existed: December 17, 1952–present

== RM 2023 ==
Ranch to Market Road 2023
- Location: Pecos County
- Length: 11.931 mi (19.201 km)
- Existed: November 24, 1959–present

Ranch to Market Road 2023 (RM 2023) is 12 miles (19 km) long and is located in Pecos County. It provides access to a natural gas field from I-10 between Fort Stockton and Bakersfield.

RM 2023 begins in the Puckett Gas Field at the north end of Puckett Road, a county road that approaches from the southeast from US 285. After a short distance, RM 2023 intersects Harrel Road, which connects to RM 2886. The road then proceeds northward through ranch land along drainage canyons before ending at I-10 approximately 22 miles (35 km) east of Fort Stockton.

RM 2023 was designated on November 24, 1959, along its current route. The route previously ended at US 290, the predecessor to I-10 through much of western Texas.

=== FM 2023 ===
Farm to Market Road 2023
- Location: Nacogdoches County
- Existed: December 17, 1952–November 28, 1958

A previous route, Farm to Market Road 2023 (FM 2023), was designated in Nacogdoches County on December 17, 1952, from US 59 in Garrison southeast 4.0 miles (6.4 km) to a road intersection. On November 28, 1958, FM 2023 was cancelled and transferred to FM 138.

== FM 2024 ==
Farm to Market Road 2024
- Location: Sabine County
- Length: 5.132 mi (8.259 km)
- Existed: December 17, 1952–present

== FM 2025 ==
Farm to Market Road 2025
- Location: San Jacinto and Liberty counties
- Length: 16.004 mi (25.756 km)
- Existed: December 17, 1952–present

Farm to Market Road 2025 (FM 2025) is located in San Jacinto and Liberty counties. It runs from SH 150 south of Coldspring to I-69/US 59 in Cleveland.

FM 2025 was designated on December 17, 1952, from FM 945 south 6.1 miles (9.8 km) to US 59 in Cleveland (a portion of the route was initially planned as FM 1412 in 1949). On November 21, 1956, the road was extended north 4.9 miles (7.9 km). On December 17, 1956, the road was extended 5.3 miles (8.5 km) to SH 150 some 2 miles (3.2 km) south of Coldspring, replacing FM 1828.

== FM 2026 ==
Farm to Market Road 2026
- Location: Shelby County
- Length: 10.500 mi (16.898 km)
- Existed: December 17, 1952–present

== FM 2027 ==
Farm to Market Road 2027
- Location: Falls and Milam counties
- Length: 25.836 mi (41.579 km)
- Existed: October 31, 1958–present

=== FM 2027 (1952) ===
Farm to Market Road 2027
- Location: Brown County
- Existed: December 17, 1952–April 22, 1958

A previous route numbered FM 2027 was designated on December 17, 1952, from US 377, 5 miles (8.0 km) south of Brownwood, southwest 5.6 miles (9.0 km) to a road intersection. On November 21, 1956, the road was extended southwest 6.3 miles (10.1 km) to FM 586. FM 2027 was cancelled on April 22, 1958, and transferred to FM 1176.

== FM 2028 ==
Farm to Market Road 2028
- Location: McCulloch County
- Length: 21.061 mi (33.894 km)
- Existed: December 17, 1952–present

== FM 2029 ==
Farm to Market Road 2029
- Location: Fannin County
- Length: 5.512 mi (8.871 km)
- Existed: September 20, 1961–present

=== FM 2029 (1952) ===
Farm to Market Road 2029
- Location: Dimmit County
- Existed: December 17, 1952–October 29, 1953

The first use of the FM 2029 designation was in Dimmit County, from the Zavala County line south 8.0 miles (12.9 km) via Big Wells. FM 2029 was cancelled a year later and transferred to FM 1867.

=== FM 2029 (1953) ===
Farm to Market Road 2029
- Location: Dallam and Hartley counties
- Existed: December 1, 1953–December 18, 1959

The next use of the FM 2029 designation was in Dallam and Hartley counties, from FM 281 north 1.7 miles (2.7 km) to FM 297 east of Dalhart. FM 2029 was cancelled on December 18, 1959, and transferred to FM 807.

== FM 2030 ==
Farm to Market Road 2030
- Location: Maverick County
- Length: 4.96 mi (7.98 km)
- Existed: December 17, 1952–present

Farm to Market Road 2030 (FM 2030) is located in Maverick County. It intersects FM 1021 at both ends, providing access to the community of Chula Vista, southeast of Eagle Pass.

FM 2030 was designated on December 17, 1952, along the current route.

== FM 2031 ==
Farm to Market Road 2031
- Location: Matagorda County
- Length: 6.537 mi (10.520 km)
- Existed: December 17, 1952–present

Farm to Market Road 2031 (FM 2031) is located in Matagorda County. It begins at the Gulf of Mexico, at the entrance to Matagorda County Jetty Park on Matagorda Peninsula. The route heads north along the strip of land which separates Matagorda Bay and East Matagorda Bay, and parallels the Colorado River to its west. FM 2031 enters Matagorda before ending at SH 60.

FM 2031 was designated on December 17, 1952, replacing SH 344.

== FM 2032 ==
Farm to Market Road 2032 (FM 2032) is a designation that has been used twice. No highway currently uses the FM 2032 designation.

=== FM 2032 (1952) ===
Farm to Market Road 2032
- Location: Howard County
- Existed: December 17, 1952–December 31, 1959

The first route numbered FM 2032 was designated on December 17, 1952, running from FM 817, running eastward via Luther to a road intersection at a distance of 6.1 miles (9.8 km). FM 817 became part of FM 669 on October 30, 1953. The highway was extended 10.4 miles (16.7 km) to Vincent on July 28, 1955. FM 2032 was cancelled on December 31, 1959, with the mileage being transferred to FM 846.

=== FM 2032 (1960) ===
Farm to Market Road 2032
- Location: Hunt County
- Existed: September 27, 1960–August 19, 1964

The second route numbered FM 2032 was designated on September 27, 1960, running from I-30 southwest of Greenville to US 67 at a distance of 3.3 miles (5.3 km). The highway was cancelled on August 19, 1964, with the mileage being transferred to FM 1570.

== FM 2033 ==
Farm to Market Road 2033
- Location: Wheeler County
- Length: 1.713 mi (2.757 km)
- Existed: December 17, 1952–present

== RM 2034 ==
Ranch to Market Road 2034
- Location: Coke and Tom Green counties
- Length: 30.105 mi (Note: RM 2034 was originally designated as FM 2034 from 1953 to 1959.) (Note: The certified length given is shorter than the actual mileage, as the TxDOT description of RM 2034 considers it to be discontinuous at rather than concurrent with SH 158.) (48.449 km)
- Existed: October 28, 1953–present

Ranch to Market Road 2034 (RM 2034) is located in Coke and Tom Green counties.

RM 2034 begins near the Tom Green–Coke county line. The highway travels through highly rural areas and passes by many ranches. RM 2034 has a junction with US 87 near Water Valley, before running through more rural areas. The highway has a short overlap with SH 158 near the south shore of the E.V. Spence Reservoir. After leaving its overlap with SH 158, RM 2034 runs in a mostly eastern direction before ending at an intersection with SH 208 just south of Robert Lee.

RM 2034 was designated October 28, 1953, as Farm to Market Road 2034 (FM 2034) from SH 208 westward and southwestward 10.0 miles (16.1 km). On October 26, 1954, FM 2034 was extended southwest 3.0 miles (4.8 km). On August 24, 1955, FM 2034 was extended southwest 4.2 miles (6.8 km). On November 21, 1956, FM 2034 was extended southwest 7.2 miles (11.6 km) to US 87 and FM 2186. On March 24, 1958, FM 2186 was cancelled and combined with FM 2034, extending FM 2034 to its current southern terminus 9.2 miles (14.8 km) west of US 87. On November 13, 1959, FM 2034 was redesignated as RM 2034. On January 21, 1969, a 2.5-mile (4.0 km) section was cancelled due to construction of E.V. Spence Reservoir.

Junction list

County	Location	mi	km	Destinations	Notes
Tom Green		0.0	0.0	Coke county line	
Tom Green		8.4	13.5	US 87 – Sterling City, San Angelo	
Coke		28.3	45.5	SH 158 west – Sterling City	West end of SH 158 overlap
Coke		30.9	49.7	SH 158 east – Robert Lee	East end of SH 158 overlap
Coke		32.7	52.6	SH 208 – Robert Lee, San Angelo	
1.000 mi = 1.609 km; 1.000 km = 0.621 mi

=== FM 2034 (1952) ===
Farm to Market Road 2034
- Location: DeWitt County
- Existed: December 17, 1952–October 28, 1953

A previous route numbered FM 2034 was designated in DeWitt County on December 17, 1952, from US 183 east 2.0 miles (3.2 km) to Lower Meyersville. FM 2034 was cancelled on October 28, 1953, and transferred to FM 237.

== FM 2035 ==
Farm to Market Road 2035
- Location: Nolan and Taylor counties
- Length: 18.240 mi (29.354 km)
- Existed: June 1, 1965–present

=== FM 2035 (1952) ===
Farm to Market Road 2035
- Location: Kerr County
- Existed: December 17, 1952–December 19, 1958

The first use of the FM 2035 designation was in Kerr County, from SH 41 near Mountain Home south 8.2 miles (13.2 km) to FM 1340. FM 2035 was cancelled on December 19, 1958, and removed from the highway system.

=== FM 2035 (1961) ===
Farm to Market Road 2035
- Location: Johnson County
- Existed: September 20, 1961–May 21, 1964

The next use of the FM 2035 was in Johnson County, from SH 174, 2.6 miles (4.2 km) southwest of US 81, south 5.1 miles (8.2 km) to FM 917. FM 2035 was cancelled on May 21, 1964, and transferred to FM 731.

== FM 2036 ==
Farm to Market Road 2036
- Location: Lamar County
- Length: 1.329 mi (2.139 km)
- Existed: June 28, 1963–present

=== FM 2036 (1952) ===
Farm to Market Road 2036
- Location: Leon and Madison counties
- Existed: December 17, 1952–May 25, 1962

A previous route numbered FM 2036 was designated on December 17, 1952, from SH OSR, 4 miles (6.4 km) north of Midway, north 2.2 miles (3.5 km) to a road intersection. On October 31, 1957, the road was extended north 3.5 miles (5.6 km), and was extended another 1.0 mile (1.6 km) north on January 31, 1961. FM 2036 was cancelled on May 25, 1962, and transferred to FM 1119.

== FM 2037 ==
Farm to Market Road 2037
- Location: Pecos County
- Length: 9.758 mi (15.704 km)
- Existed: May 2, 1962–present

Farm to Market Road 2037 (FM 2037) is located in Pecos County. It begins at the TDCJ Lynaugh Unit and proceeds to the east 1.1 miles (1.8 km) to Old Alpine Road. FM 2037 then follows Old Alpine Road 1.7 miles (2.7 km) to the northeast parallel with the South Orient Railroad, passing through Belding. It then turns north to an intersection with I-10. FM 2037 ends along the south service road of I-10 to the west of the overpass at I-10 exit 253, approximately 6 miles (10 km) west of Fort Stockton.

The current FM 2037 was designated on May 2, 1962, over a seven-mile (11 km) stretch from the Old Alpine Road to US 290, the route which preceded I-10. The route was extended to the prison site on October 29, 1992.

The Old Alpine Road portion of the route has a much longer history with the state highway network. The US 67 designation was extended westward from Dallas to Presidio in 1932. The portion of US 67 between Alpine and Fort Stockton was constructed as an unpaved earth road sometime between 1933 and 1936 and was also designated as SH 99 (later SH 10). The SH 10 designation did not survive the 1939 redescription of the state highway system, and US 67 was realigned off of the Old Alpine Rd. when its more westward current roadway was constructed in 1947.

Junction list

The entire road is in Pecos County.

Location	mi	km	Destinations	Notes
	0.0	0.0	Drive to prison site	Southern terminus at TDCJ Lynaugh Unit
	1.1	1.8	To US 67 south (Old Alpine Road) – Alpine	Begin overlay of Old Alpine Road
	2.8	4.5	To Spur 194 north (Old Alpine Rd.) – Fort Stockton	End overlay of Old Alpine Road
	9.8	15.8	I-10 / US 67 – Van Horn, San Antonio	Northern terminus
1.000 mi = 1.609 km; 1.000 km = 0.621 mi

=== FM 2037 (1952) ===
Farm to Market Road 2037
- Location: Brazos County
- Length: 12.3 mi (19.8 km)
- Existed: 1952–1961

FM 2037 was originally designated on December 17, 1952 as a 6.7-mile (10.8 km) route in northeastern Brazos County beginning along the concurrent routes of US 190 / SH 21 near the Navasota River proceeding to the northwest to the town of Edge. On November 21, 1956, that route was extended an additional 5.9 miles (9.5 km) to the southwest to FM 2038. The Brazos County designation was canceled on October 13, 1961 when the route was added as an extension to FM 974.

== FM 2038 ==
Farm to Market Road 2038
- Location: Brazos County
- Length: 10.890 mi (17.526 km)
- Existed: December 17, 1952–present

Farm to Market Road 2038 (FM 2038) is located in Brazos County. It runs from FM 974, 3 miles (4.8 km) northeast of Tabor, southeastward to Bus. SH 21 in Kurten, then from another point on Bus. SH 21 southeastward to Cobb Rd near Reliance.

FM 2038 was designated on December 17, 1952, from SH 21 in Kurten northwest 5.6 miles (9.0 km) to a county road. This road would later become part of FM 2037, and later, FM 974. On August 24, 1955, FM 2038 was extended southeast 5.5 miles (8.9 km).

Junction list

The entire route is in Brazos County.

Location	mi	km	Destinations	Notes
			FM 974	
Kurten			Bus. SH 21 east	East end of Bus. SH 21 overlap
Kurten			Bus. SH 21 west	West end of Bus. SH 21 overlap
Kurten			SH 21 / US 190 – Bryan, Madisonville	
			FM 1179 south	
			Cobb Road	
1.000 mi = 1.609 km; 1.000 km = 0.621 mi

== FM 2039 ==
Farm to Market Road 2039
- Location: Burleson County
- Length: 4.601 mi (7.405 km)
- Existed: December 17, 1952–present

== FM 2040 ==
Farm to Market Road 2040
- Location: Refugio and Aransas counties
- Length: 6.382 mi (10.271 km)
- Existed: December 17, 1952–present

Farm to Market Road 2040 (FM 2040) is located in Refugio and Aransas counties. It runs from FM 774 to the Aransas National Wildlife Refuge.

FM 2040 was designated on December 17, 1952, on the current route. A 1 mile (1.6 km) extension to SH 239 was proposed on November 25, 1975, but was cancelled on August 31, 1977, due to heavy local opposition.

== FM 2041 ==
Farm to Market Road 2041
- Location: Chambers County
- Length: 0.723 mi (1,164 m)
- Existed: December 17, 1952–present

Farm to Market Road 2041 (FM 2041) is located in Chambers County. It runs west–east approximately 0.7 miles (1.1 km) from FM 563 north of Anahuac to SH 61.

FM 2041 was designated on December 17, 1952, on the current route.

== FM 2042 ==
Farm to Market Road 2042
- Location: Childress County
- Length: 15.933 mi (25.642 km)
- Existed: December 17, 1952–present

== FM 2043 ==
Farm to Market Road 2043
- Location: Goliad County
- Length: 8.444 mi (13.589 km)
- Existed: December 17, 1952–present

== FM 2044 ==
Farm to Market Road 2044
- Location: Jim Wells County
- Length: 12.984 mi (20.896 km)
- Existed: December 17, 1952–present

== FM 2045 ==
Farm to Market Road 2045
- Location: Kleberg County
- Length: 3.371 mi (5.425 km)
- Existed: December 17, 1952–present

== FM 2046 ==
Farm to Market Road 2046
- Location: San Patricio County
- Length: 6.61 mi (10.64 km)
- Existed: September 21, 1955–present

=== FM 2046 (1952) ===
Farm to Market Road 2046
- Location: Taylor County
- Existed: December 17, 1952–January 21, 1955

A previous route numbered FM 2046 was designated on December 17, 1952, from US 83 at Bradshaw west 9.1 miles (14.6 km) to a road intersection. On September 29, 1954, the road was extended 6.6 miles (10.6 km) northwest to US 277 near Shep. FM 2046 was cancelled on January 21, 1955, and became a portion of FM 1086.

== FM 2047 ==
Farm to Market Road 2047
- Location: Callahan County
- Length: 3.821 mi (6.149 km)
- Existed: June 28, 1963–present

=== FM 2047 (1952) ===
Farm to Market Road 2047
- Location: Lamar County
- Existed: December 17, 1952–May 2, 1962

A previous route numbered FM 2047 was designated on December 17, 1952, from FM 197 northwest 2.0 miles (3.2 km) to Garretts Bluff. FM 2047 was cancelled on May 5, 1962, and transferred to FM 1499.

== FM 2048 ==
Farm to Market Road 2048
- Location: Wise County
- Length: 6.489 mi (10.443 km)
- Existed: October 31, 1958–present

=== FM 2048 (1953) ===
Farm to Market Road 2048
- Location: San Saba County
- Existed: January 22, 1953–September 23, 1954

A previous route numbered FM 2048 was designated on January 22, 1953, from FM 45, 5.5 miles (8.9 km) north of Richland Springs, northwest 6.0 miles (9.7 km) to a road intersection at Holt. Nine months later the road was extended northwest 4.5 miles (7.2 km) to the McCulloch County line. FM 2048 was cancelled on September 23, 1954, and became a portion of FM 502.

== FM 2049 ==
Farm to Market Road 2049
- Location: Live Oak County
- Length: 10.456 mi (16.827 km)
- Existed: December 17, 1952–present

== FM 2050 ==
Farm to Market Road 2050
- Location: Webb County
- Length: 24.649 mi (39.669 km)
- Existed: December 17, 1952–present

Farm to Market 2050 (FM 2050) is a road that connects SH 359 at Bruni to US 59 (future I-69W).

FM 2050 was designated on December 17, 1952, along its current route.

== FM 2051 ==
Farm to Market Road 2051
- Location: Dawson County
- Length: 12.574 mi (20.236 km)
- Existed: December 17, 1952–present

== FM 2052 ==
Farm to Market Road 2052
- Location: Dawson County
- Length: 7.589 mi (12.213 km)
- Existed: December 17, 1952–present

== FM 2053 ==
Farm to Market Road 2053
- Location: Dawson and Lynn counties
- Length: 28.434 mi (45.760 km)
- Existed: December 17, 1952–present

== FM 2054 ==
Farm to Market Road 2054
- Location: Anderson County
- Length: 3.448 mi (5.549 km)
- Existed: November 28, 1967–present

=== FM 2054 (1952) ===
Farm to Market Road 2054
- Location: Dawson County
- Existed: December 17, 1952–June 19, 1967

A previous route numbered FM 2054 was designated on December 17, 1952, from SH 137, 4.3 miles (6.9 km) southeast of Welch, west 5.0 miles (8.0 km) to a road intersection. FM 2054 was cancelled on June 19, 1967, and transferred to FM 1066.

== FM 2055 ==
Farm to Market Road 2055
- Location: Gaines and Yoakum counties
- Length: 10.241 mi (16.481 km)
- Existed: December 17, 1952–present

Farm to Market Road 2055 (FM 2055) is located in Gaines and Yoakum counties. It runs from FM 1757 to SH 83 in Denver City.

FM 2055 was designated on December 17, 1952, from FM 1757 north, east and north to the Yoakum County line. On January 24, 1955, the road was extended 1.6 miles (2.6 km) north to SH 214 northeast of Denver City, replacing Loop 139. On April 25, 1960, the section from SH 83 to SH 214 was removed from the state highway system and returned to Denver City.

== FM 2056 ==
Farm to Market Road 2056
- Location: Gaines County
- Length: 1.187 mi (1.910 km)
- Existed: December 17, 1952–present

== FM 2057 ==
Farm to Market Road 2057
- Location: Camp County
- Length: 2.985 mi (4.804 km)
- Existed: February 24, 1953–present

== FM 2058 ==
Farm to Market Road 2058
- Location: Hidalgo County
- Length: 5.809 mi (9.349 km)
- Existed: December 17, 1952–present

== RM 2059 ==
Ranch to Market Road 2059
- Location: Coke County
- Length: 15.749 mi (25.346 km)
- Existed: October 31, 1958 (Note: RM 2059 was originally designated as FM 2059 from 1958 to 1959.)–present

=== FM 2059 ===
Farm to Market Road 2059
- Location: Hidalgo County
- Existed: December 17, 1952–January 20, 1958

FM 2059 was designated on December 17, 1952, from FM 681, 2.3 miles (3.7 km) east of McCook, to a point 6.2 miles (10.0 km) east. On October 31, 1957, the road was extended east to US 281. On January 20, 1958, FM 2059 was cancelled and transferred to FM 490.

== FM 2060 ==
Farm to Market Road 2060
- Location: Hale County
- Length: 5.085 mi (8.184 km)
- Existed: October 31, 1958–present

=== FM 2060 (1952) ===
Farm to Market Road 2060
- Location: Hidalgo County
- Existed: December 17, 1952–May 6, 1954

A previous route numbered FM 2060 was designated on December 17, 1952, from US 83 west of Weslaco south 2.1 miles (3.4 km) to FM 88. FM 2060 was cancelled on May 6, 1954, and became a portion of FM 1015.

== FM 2061 ==
Farm to Market Road 2061
- Location: Hidalgo County
- Length: 16.916 mi (Note: The certified length given is shorter than the actual mileage, as the TxDOT description of FM 2061 considers it to be discontinuous at rather than concurrent with Bus. US 83.) (27.224 km)
- Existed: December 17, 1952–present

Farm to Market Road 2061 (FM 2061) is located in Hidalgo County in the Rio Grande Valley.

FM 2061 begins at an intersection with US 281 Spur in southern Pharr. The highway runs along Jackson Road through more suburban areas and runs through a commercialized area near I-2/US 83. Just north of I-2/US 83, FM 2061 begins an overlap with Bus. US 83 then enters McAllen. The highway leaves its overlap with Bus. US 83 at McColl Road and passes through a suburban area of the city. FM 2061 crosses into Edinburg at Dove Avenue and runs near the western edge of the city before ending at an intersection with FM 1925.

FM 2061 was designated on December 17, 1952, running from SH 107 southward to US 83. The highway was extended southward from US 83 to US 281 on October 31, 1957. FM 2061 was extended northward from US 83 to FM 1925 on June 1, 1965. On June 27, 1995, the entire route was redesignated Urban Road 2061 (UR 2061). The designation reverted to FM 2061 with the elimination of the Urban Road system on November 15, 2018.

Junction list

The entire route is in Hidalgo County.

Location	mi	km	Destinations	Notes
Pharr	0.0	0.0	US 281 Spur (Military Highway) – Pharr, Hidalgo, International Bridge	
Pharr	2.0	3.2	FM 3072 (Dicker Road)	
Pharr	6.9	11.1	I-2 / US 83 (Expressway 83)	I-2 exit 144
Pharr	7.1	11.4	Bus. US 83 east	South end of Bus. US 83 overlap
McAllen	7.6	12.2	Bus. US 83 west	North end of Bus. US 83 overlap
McAllen	8.7	14.0	SH 495 (Pecan Boulevard)	
Edinburg	15.0	24.1	SH 107 (University Drive)	
Edinburg	17.5	28.2	FM 1925 (Monte Christo Road)	
1.000 mi = 1.609 km; 1.000 km = 0.621 mi: Concurrency terminus

== FM 2062 ==
Farm to Market Road 2062
- Location: Hidalgo County
- Length: 2.649 mi (4.263 km)
- Existed: December 17, 1952–present

Farm to Market Road 2062 (FM 2062) is located in Hidalgo County in the Rio Grande Valley.

FM 2062 begins at Park Road 43 at the main entrance to Bentsen-Rio Grande Valley State Park. The highway runs through less developed areas of southwestern Mission before entering Palmview South. FM 2062 then enters Palmview, where it ends at an intersection with Bus. US 83. The highway is known locally as Bentsen Palm Drive.

FM 2062 was designated on December 17, 1952, running from US 83 (now Bus. US 83) southward to Bentsen-Rio Grande Valley State Park. The highway was extended eastward from the state park to FM 1016 in the Madero area of Mission on June 28, 1963. This extension was removed from the state highway system on November 26, 1969, as it was never constructed. On June 27, 1995, the entire route was redesignated Urban Road 2062 (UR 2062). The designation reverted to FM 2062 with the elimination of the Urban Road system on November 15, 2018.

== FM 2063 ==
Farm to Market Road 2063
- Location: McLennan County
- Length: 1.576 mi (2.536 km)
- Existed: November 24, 1959–present

Farm to Market Road 2063 (FM 2063) is located in McLennan County in the city of Hewitt.

FM 2063 begins at a junction with I-35/FM 2113. The highway runs along Sun Valley Road and intersects FM 3476 before ending at an intersection with FM 1695 near the town square. FM 2063 is known locally as Sun Valley Boulevard.

The current FM 2063 was designated on November 24, 1959, running from FM 1695 eastward to I-35. On June 27, 1995, the entire route was redesignated Urban Road 2063 (UR 2063). The designation reverted to FM 2063 with the elimination of the Urban Road system on November 15, 2018.

Junction list

The entire route is in Hewitt, McLennan County.

mi	km	Destinations	Notes
0.0	0.0	I-35 / FM 2113 south (Spring Valley Road)	I-35 exit 328
0.7	1.1	FM 3476 east (Old Temple Road)	
1.6	2.6	FM 1695 (Hewitt Drive)	
1.000 mi = 1.609 km; 1.000 km = 0.621 mi

=== FM 2063 (1952) ===
Farm to Market Road 2063
- Location: Jack County
- Existed: December 17, 1952–October 18, 1954

The first route numbered FM 2063 was designated on December 17, 1952, from US 281 at Antelope north to the Clay County line. FM 2063 was cancelled on October 18, 1954, and became a portion of FM 175.

=== FM 2063 (1955) ===
Farm to Market Road 2063
- Location: Hale County
- Existed: October 25, 1955–November 26, 1958

The second route numbered FM 2063 was designated on October 25, 1955, from FM 594 at Cotton Center east 8.0 miles (12.9 km) to US 87. FM 2063 was cancelled on November 26, 1958, and transferred to FM 1315 (now FM 37).

== FM 2064 ==
Farm to Market Road 2064
- Location: Cherokee County
- Length: 8.991 mi (14.470 km)
- Existed: December 17, 1952–present

Farm to Market Road 2064 (FM 2064) is located in Cherokee County. It runs from SH 135 (former FM 347) south of Troup via Gould to another point along SH 135 at Tecula.

FM 2064 was designated on December 17, 1952, on the current route. On July 28, 2005, a 1.98-mile (3.19 km) section of FM 2064, from south of FM 2750 to east of CR 4223, was removed from the highway system, as it was planned to be inundated by Lake Columbia, and a 2.1-mile (3.4 km) section from east of CR 4223 to SH 135 was redesignated FM 3540. As of 2023, the lake has not been constructed.

== FM 2065 ==
Farm to Market Road 2065
- Location: Cass County
- Length: 1.362 mi (2.192 km)
- Existed: January 23, 1953–present

== FM 2066 ==
Farm to Market Road 2066
- Location: Terry County
- Length: 9.073 mi (14.602 km)
- Existed: December 17, 1952–present

== FM 2067 ==
Farm to Market Road 2067
- Location: Gonzales County
- Length: 7.183 mi (11.560 km)
- Existed: September 23, 1953–present

=== FM 2067 (1952) ===
Farm to Market Road 2067
- Location: Hidalgo County
- Existed: December 17, 1952–September 22, 1953

A previous route numbered FM 2067 was designated on December 17, 1952, from US 281, 1.2 miles (1.9 km) east of Progresso, south 1.7 miles (2.7 km) to the Rio Grande. FM 2067 was cancelled on September 22, 1953, and transferred to FM 88 (now FM 1015).

== FM 2068 ==
Farm to Market Road 2068
- Location: Hunt and Delta counties
- Length: 6.897 mi (11.100 km)
- Existed: December 17, 1952–present

Farm to Market Road 2068 (FM 2068) is located in Hunt and Delta counties. It runs from SH 50 at Jardin to FM 1528 at Gough. There is a concurrency with FM 904.

FM 2068 was designated on December 17, 1952, from SH 11 (now SH 50) at Jardin east to FM 904. On October 15, 1954, the road was extended east 3.3 miles (5.3 km) to FM 1528 at Gough, replacing FM 2127 and creating a concurrency with FM 904.

== FM 2069 ==
Farm to Market Road 2069
- Location: Baylor County
- Length: 11.289 mi (18.168 km)
- Existed: December 17, 1952–present

== FM 2070 ==
Farm to Market Road 2070
- Location: Baylor County
- Length: 8.015 mi (12.899 km)
- Existed: December 17, 1952–present

Farm to Market Road 2070 (FM 2070) is located in Baylor County. It runs from US 277 southwest of Seymour to the Knox County line.

FM 2070 was designated on December 17, 1952, from US 277, 5.5 miles (8.9 km) southwest of Seymour, west 4.1 miles (6.6 km) to a road intersection. On August 24, 1955, the road was extended west and south 5.1 miles (8.2 km) to US 277 at Bomarton. This extension was cancelled on December 4, 1957, in exchange for FM 2070 being extended west 4.1 miles (6.6 km) to the Knox County line.

== FM 2071 ==
Farm to Market Road 2071
- Location: Cooke County
- Length: 8.569 mi (13.790 km)
- Existed: December 17, 1952–present

== FM 2072 ==
Farm to Market Road 2072
- Location: Wilbarger County
- Length: 4.426 mi (7.123 km)
- Existed: December 17, 1952–present

== FM 2073 ==
Farm to Market Road 2073
- Location: Wilbarger County
- Length: 8.272 mi (13.312 km)
- Existed: December 17, 1952–present

== FM 2074 ==
Farm to Market Road 2074
- Location: Wilbarger County
- Length: 5.647 mi (9.088 km)
- Existed: December 17, 1952–present

== FM 2075 ==
Farm to Market Road 2075
- Location: Young County
- Length: 5.729 mi (9.220 km)
- Existed: December 17, 1952–present

== FM 2076 ==
Farm to Market Road 2076
- Location: Houston County
- Length: 5.969 mi (9.606 km)
- Existed: October 28, 1953–present

=== FM 2076 (1952) ===
Farm to Market Road 2076
- Location: Young County
- Existed: December 17, 1952–October 28, 1953

A previous route numbered FM 2076 was designated on December 17, 1952, from FM 209 east of the Throckmorton County line south 4.5 miles (7.2 km) to the Stephens County line. FM 2076 was cancelled on October 28, 1953, and transferred to FM 578.

== FM 2077 ==
Farm to Market Road 2077
- Location: Fannin County
- Length: 5.163 mi (8.309 km)
- Existed: October 30, 1958–present

=== FM 2077 (1952) ===
Farm to Market Road 2077
- Location: Lipscomb County
- Existed: December 17, 1952–November 29, 1957

A previous route numbered FM 2077 was designated on December 17, 1952, from SH 213, 7 miles (11 km) northwest of Higgins, north 5.7 miles (9.2 km) to the south bank of Wolf Creek. On September 21, 1955, the road was extended north 0.2 miles (0.32 km) across Wolf Creek. FM 2077 was cancelled on November 29, 1957, and transferred to FM 1454.

== FM 2078 ==
Farm to Market Road 2078
- Location: Matagorda County
- Length: 2.357 mi (3.793 km)
- Existed: September 21, 1955–present

Farm to Market Road 2078 (FM 2078) is located in Matagorda County. It runs from SH 60 in Wadsworth to FM 2668.

FM 2078 was designated on September 21, 1955, as a replacement of a section of FM 521 when it was rerouted southwest.

=== FM 2078 (1952) ===
Farm to Market Road 2078
- Location: Tarrant County
- Existed: December 17, 1952–December 1, 1953

A previous route numbered FM 2078 was designated on December 17, 1952, from FM 156 at Saginaw, east and south 9.6 miles (15.4 km) to SH 121. FM 2078 was cancelled on December 1, 1953, and removed from the highway system in exchange for creation of FM 1220.

== FM 2079 ==
Farm to Market Road 2079
- Location: Bailey County
- Length: 3.722 mi (5.990 km)
- Existed: December 17, 1952–present

== FM 2080 ==
Farm to Market Road 2080
- Location: Lamb County
- Length: 3.644 mi (5.864 km)
- Existed: December 17, 1952–present

Farm to Market Road 2080 (FM 2080) is located in Lamb County. It runs from US 70 in Springlake east 3.6 miles (5.8 km) to FM 1842.

FM 2080 was designated on December 17, 1952, along the current route.

== FM 2081 ==
Farm to Market Road 2081
- Location: Hopkins and Rains counties
- Length: 2.995 mi (4.820 km)
- Existed: June 28, 1963–present

=== FM 2081 (1952) ===
Farm to Market Road 2081
- Location: Newton County
- Existed: December 17, 1952–August 24, 1955

The first use of the FM 2081 designation was in Newton County, from SH 87, 2 miles (3.2 km) south of Bleakwood, to a point 0.8 miles (1.3 km) southeast. On October 28, 1953, the road was extended east and southeast 3.3 miles (5.3 km) miles, and another 3.1 miles (5.0 km) southeast on September 29, 1954. FM 2081 was cancelled on August 24, 1955, and transferred to FM 1416 (now partly FM 2460).

=== FM 2081 (1955) ===
Farm to Market Road 2081
- Location: Lynn County
- Existed: September 21, 1955–January 8, 1960

The second use of the FM 2081 designation was in Lynn County, from US 380, 1.5 miles (2.4 km) east of the Terry County line, north 8.3 miles (13.4 km) to a road intersection. On November 21, 1956, the road was extended south 9.8 miles (15.8 km) to FM 213. FM 2081 was cancelled on January 8, 1960, and transferred to FM 179.

=== FM 2081 (1960) ===
Farm to Market Road 2081
- Location: Kaufman County
- Existed: September 27, 1960–May 25, 1962

The third use of the FM 2081 designation was in Kaufman County, from I-20 east of Forney northeast 7.6 miles (12.2 km) to the Rockwall County line. On May 2, 1962, the road was extended northeast 0.7 miles (1.1 km) to SH 205. FM 2081 was cancelled on May 25, 1962, and transferred to FM 548.

== FM 2082 ==
Farm to Market Road 2082
- Location: Haskell County
- Length: 3.635 mi (5.850 km)
- Existed: October 31, 1958–present

=== FM 2082 (1952) ===
Farm to Market Road 2082
- Location: Crosby County
- Existed: December 17, 1952–July 19, 1954

A previous route numbered FM 2082 was designated on December 17, 1952, from FM 651 east 3.0 miles (4.8 km) to Kalgary as a renumbering of a section of FM 651. FM 2082 was canceled on July 19, 1954, and transferred to FM 261.

== RM 2083 ==
Ranch to Market Road 2083
- Location: Crockett County
- Length: 35.891 mi (57.761 km)
- Existed: December 17, 1952 (Note: RM 2083 was originally designated as FM 2083 from 1952 to 1957.)–present

This was originally FM 2083.

== RM 2084 ==
Ranch to Market Road 2084
- Location: Tom Green and Schleicher counties
- Length: 27.605 mi (44.426 km)
- Existed: December 17, 1952 (Note: RM 2084 was originally designated as FM 2084 from 1952 to 1959.)–present

Ranch to Market Road 2084 (RM 2084) is located in Tom Green and Schleicher counties. It runs from US 277 at Christoval to US 190.

RM 2084 was designated on December 17, 1952, as Farm to Market Road 2084 (FM 2084), from US 277 at Christoval to a point 8.5 miles (13.7 km) southeast. On May 26, 1954, the road was extended southeast 6.4 miles (10.3 km) (this extension cancelled FM 2085). On November 13, 1959, FM 2084 was changed to RM 2084. On September 20, 1961, the road was extended south 6.3 miles (10.1 km). On October 9, 1961, the road was extended south 7.0 miles (11.3 km) to SH 29 (now US 190), replacing RM 2479.

== FM 2085 ==
Farm to Market Road 2085
- Location: Scurry County
- Length: 2.540 mi (4.088 km)
- Existed: August 24, 1954–present

=== FM 2085 (1952) ===
Farm to Market Road 2085
- Location: Tom Green County
- Existed: December 17, 1952–May 26, 1954

FM 2085 was designated on December 17, 1952, from US 67 at Tankersley south 6.6 miles (10.6 km) to Knickerbocker. FM 2085 was cancelled on May 26, 1954, in exchange for extending FM 2084 southeast the same distance from its previous end.

== FM 2086 ==
Farm to Market Road 2086
- Location: Bell County
- Length: 7.955 mi (12.802 km)
- Existed: December 17, 1952–present

== FM 2087 ==
Farm to Market Road 2087
- Location: Gregg County
- Length: 5.935 mi (9.551 km)
- Existed: December 17, 1952–present

Farm to Market Road 2087 (FM 2087) is located in Gregg County. It runs from FM 349 in Kilgore north to Loop 281 in Longview.

FM 2087 was designated on December 17, 1952, along its current route; at the time, Loop 281 was designated FM 1919. On June 27, 1995, the section from I-20 to Loop 281 was redesignated Urban Road 2087 (UR 2087). The designation of this section reverted to FM 2087 with the elimination of the Urban Road system on November 15, 2018.

The entire route is in Gregg County.

Location	mi	km	Destinations	Notes
Kilgore	0.0	0.0	FM 349 – Kilgore, Lakeport	
	1.3	2.1	FM 2276 south	
	2.5	4.0	FM 2011 east	
	2.7	4.3	I-20 / US 259 – Dallas, Shreveport	I-20 exit 591
Longview	5.9	9.5	Loop 281	
1.000 mi = 1.609 km; 1.000 km = 0.621 mi

== FM 2088 ==
Farm to Market Road 2088
- Location: Wood and Upshur counties
- Length: 30.99 mi (49.87 km)
- Existed: December 17, 1952–present

== FM 2089 ==
Farm to Market Road 2089
- Location: Smith and Rusk counties
- Length: 4.817 mi (7.752 km)
- Existed: October 29, 1953–present

=== FM 2089 (1952) ===
Farm to Market Road 2089
- Location: Wood County
- Existed: December 17, 1952–October 27, 1953

A previous route numbered FM 2089 was designated on December 17, 1952, from FM 17, 3 miles (4.8 km) west of Yantis, west 2.7 miles (4.3 km) to the Rains County line. FM 2089 was cancelled ten months later and transferred to FM 1767 (now FM 514).

== FM 2090 ==
Farm to Market Road 2090
- Location: Montgomery and Liberty counties
- Length: 15.287 mi (24.602 km)
- Existed: December 17, 1952–present

== FM 2091 ==
Farm to Market Road 2091
- Location: Gonzales County
- Length: 11.575 mi (18.628 km)
- Existed: September 23, 1953–present

== FM 2092 ==
Farm to Market Road 2092
- Location: Menard County
- Length: 13.371 mi (21.519 km)
- Existed: October 28, 1953–present

=== FM 2092 (1952) ===
Farm to Market Road 2092
- Location: Wharton County
- Existed: December 17, 1952–October 5, 1953

A previous route numbered FM 2092 was designated on December 17, 1952, from FM 1160 north 5.8 miles (9.3 km) to a county road. FM 2092 was cancelled on October 5, 1953, and transferred to FM 1160.

== FM 2093 ==
Farm to Market Road 2093
- Location: Gillespie County
- Length: 22.533 mi (36.263 km)
- Existed: December 17, 1952–present

Farm to Market Road 2093 (FM 2093) is located in Gillespie County in the Texas Hill Country.

FM 2093 begins at an intersection with US 290/RM 783 in Harper. The highway travels in a mostly eastern direction, passes through Tivydale, before entering Fredericksburg where the road ends at an intersection with SH 16. The roadway continues past SH 16 as Friendship Lane. FM 2093 is known locally in Fredericksburg as Tivydale Road.

FM 2093 was designated on December 17, 1952, running from SH 16 towards Tivydale at a distance of 10.3 miles (16.6 km). On October 1, 1956, the designation was changed to Ranch to Market Road 2093 (RM 2093). The highway was extended northwestward to US 290 on November 21, 1956. The designation reverted to FM 2093 on May 5, 1992.

== FM 2094 ==
Farm to Market Road 2094
- Location: Galveston County
- Length: 4.126 mi (6.640 km)
- Existed: January 16, 1968–present

Farm to Market Road 2094 (FM 2094) is located in Galveston County.

FM 2094 begins at an intersection with FM 518 near FM 270 in League City. The highway travels in a northeast direction and turns in a more eastern direction at South Shore Boulevard. FM 2094 enters Kemah right before ending at an intersection with SH 146/future SH 99 near the Kemah Boardwalk. The highway is locally known as Marina Bay Drive.

The current FM 2094 was designated on January 16, 1968, along the current route. On June 27, 1995, the entire route was redesignated Urban Road 2094 (UR 2094). The designation reverted to FM 2094 with the elimination of the Urban Road system on November 15, 2018.

=== FM 2094 (1952) ===
Farm to Market Road 2094
- Location: San Patricio County
- Existed: December 17, 1952–November 20, 1953

The first use of the FM 2094 designation was in San Patricio County, from FM 632 (now SH 361) in Ingleside south, east and south 6.0 miles (9.7 km) to Redfish Bay. FM 2094 was cancelled on November 20, 1953, and transferred to FM 1069.

=== FM 2094 (1953) ===
Farm to Market Road 2094
- Location: Montague County
- Existed: December 2, 1953–July 25, 1963

The second use of the FM 2094 designation was in Montague County, from US 81 in Bowie south 4.3 miles (6.9 km) to Rock Hill School. On August 24, 1955, the road was extended south and west 5.5 miles (8.9 km) to a county road. On May 2, 1962, the road was extended southwest 3.1 miles (5.0 km) to the Jack County line. FM 2094 was cancelled on July 25, 1963, and transferred to FM 1125.

=== FM 2094 (1964) ===
Farm to Market Road 2094
- Location: Wilbarger County
- Existed: July 31, 1964–June 21, 1967

The third use of the FM 2094 designation was in Wilbarger County, from US 70 near Vernon to a point 1.8 miles (2.9 km) southwest. On June 1, 1965, the road was extended west 2.2 miles (3.5 km) to a road intersection. FM 2094 was cancelled on June 21, 1967, and became a portion of FM 2073.

== FM 2095 ==
Farm to Market Road 2095
- Location: Milam County
- Length: 14.562 mi (23.435 km)
- Existed: December 17, 1952–present

== FM 2096 ==
Farm to Market Road 2096
- Location: Robertson County
- Length: 10.203 mi (16.420 km)
- Existed: December 17, 1952–present

== FM 2097 ==
Farm to Market Road 2097
- Location: Tyler County
- Length: 3.827 mi (6.159 km)
- Existed: September 19, 1956–present

=== FM 2097 (1952) ===
Farm to Market Road 2097
- Location: Robertson County
- Existed: December 17, 1952–October 15, 1954

A previous route numbered FM 2097 was designated on December 17, 1952, from US 190 (now FM 485) near Goodland southeast 3.2 miles (5.1 km) to US 79 (now US 79/US 190) near Valley Junction. FM 2097 was cancelled on October 15, 1954, and became a portion of FM 1644.

== FM 2098 ==
Farm to Market Road 2098
- Location: Starr County
- Length: 5.900 mi (9.495 km)
- Existed: December 17, 1952–present

Farm to Market Road 2098 (FM 2098) is located in Starr County. Its southern terminus is at US 83 near Salineño. FM 2098 runs to the northwest to Falcon Heights and an intersection with PR 46, which provides access to Falcon State Park. At this junction, FM 2098 turns to the northeast, while FM Spur 2098 branches off to the west toward Falcon Dam and the Falcon Dam Port of Entry at the Lake Falcon Dam International Crossing. The route continues to its northern terminus at another junction with US 83, for a total length of 5.9 miles (9.5 km).

FM 2098 was designated on December 17, 1952, from the former alignment of US 83 at Falcon Dam northeastward to US 83. The designation was extended southeastward from Falcon Heights over former US 83 on October 27, 1953. The spur connection was added on December 19, 1958.

== FM 2099 ==
Farm to Market Road 2099
- Location: Willacy County
- Length: 8.623 mi (13.877 km)
- Existed: December 17, 1952–present
