= Niederwald =

Niederwald may refer to:

- Niederwald, Texas, United States
- Niederwald, Switzerland, in the canton of Valais
- Niederwald is the name of the hill in Germany where the Niederwalddenkmal is located
- Niederwald is the German word for coppice
