= Fun with Dick and Jane =

Fun with Dick and Jane may refer to

- Fun with Dick and Jane, a 1946 children's book, part of the Dick and Jane series
- Fun with Dick and Jane (1977 film)
- Fun with Dick and Jane (2005 film), remake of the 1977 film
