= GCISD =

GCISD may refer to:

- Goldthwaite Consolidated Independent School District
- Grapevine-Colleyville Independent School District

== See also ==
- Goose Creek Consolidated Independent School District
