= T37 =

T37 may refer to:

== Vehicles ==
- T-37A tank, a Soviet amphibious light tank
- T37 light tank, a prototype American tank developed into the M41 Walker Bulldog
- Bugatti Type 37, a French sports car
- Cessna T-37 Tweet, a Cessna trainer aircraft
- Cooper T37, a variant of the Cooper Mark IX racing car
- Prussian T 37, a 1904 German steam locomotive
- Slingsby T.37 Skylark 1, a British glider

== Other uses ==
- T37 (classification), a disability sport classification
- T-37 (rocket), an American demolition rocket
- T.37, an ITU-T recommendation
- Goldthwaite Municipal Airport, in Goldthwaite, Texas; FAA location identifier
