= Caradan, Texas =

- Unincorporated community
- Location within Texas Location within the United States
- Coordinates: 31°33′14″N 98°28′38″W
- Country: United States
- State: Texas
- County: Mills
- Elevation: 1,565 ft (477 m)
- Time zone: UTC-6 (Central (CST))
  - Summer (DST): UTC-5 (CDT)
- Area code: 325
- GNIS feature ID: 1353804

Caradan is an unincorporated community in Mills County, located in the U.S. state of Texas. According to the Handbook of Texas, the community had a population of 20 in 2000.

== History ==
Caradan was first established in the 1880s and was named after Samuel Losson Caraway and Dan T. Bush, who were among the first settlers in the area. A post office was established at Caradan in 1889 and remained in operation until 1974. The community's population was reported at 20 between 1990 and 2000. There is also a cemetery in Caradan.

== Geography ==
Caradan is located 9 mi (14 km) northeast of Goldthwaite in northeastern Mills County.

== Education ==
Today, the community is served by the Goldthwaite Independent School District.
