= The Hollywood Knights =

1980 American teen comedy film by Floyd Mutrux

- Theatrical release poster
- Directed by: Floyd Mutrux
- Screenplay by: Floyd Mutrux
- Story by: Floyd Mutrux; Richard Lederer; William Tennant
- Produced by: Richard Lederer; William Tennant (executive producer)
- Starring: Robert Wuhl; Fran Drescher; Leigh French; Randy Gornel; Gary Graham; Sandy Helberg; James Jeter; Stuart Pankin; P.R. Paul; Michelle Pfeiffer; Gailard Sartain; Richard Schaal; Tony Danza
- Cinematography: William A. Fraker
- Edited by: Stanford C. Allen; Scott Conrad; Danford B. Greene (supervising)
- Color process: Metrocolor
- Production companies: Casablanca Filmworks; PolyGram Pictures
- Distributed by: Columbia Pictures
- Release date: May 30, 1980
- Running time: 91 minutes
- Country: United States
- Language: English
- Budget: $4 million (est.)
- Box office: $10 million (domestic)

The Hollywood Knights is a 1980 American teen comedy film written and directed by Floyd Mutrux. It depicts the crass and mischievous antics and practical jokes of the remaining members of a 1950s-era car club turned social fraternity in and around Beverly Hills and Hollywood in 1965. The cast, led by Robert Wuhl as the fraternity's charismatic leader, features Tony Danza and Michelle Pfeiffer in their film debuts, as well as Gailard Sartain, Fran Drescher, and Stuart Pankin in supporting roles.

It was the inaugural film credit of PolyGram Filmed Entertainment (as PolyGram Pictures), a British studio that aimed to compete with Hollywood.

== Plot ==
On Halloween night in the year 1965, Newbomb Turk is the pledge captain of the Hollywood Knights, a car club made up of teenage boys who play pranks, harass the police and display their cars at Tubby's Drive-In restaurant in Beverly Hills, California. Tubby's is being demolished to be replaced by a new office building.

Suzie Q and her boyfriend Duke argue that she receives too much male attention, and how her desire to be an actress interferes with their relationship. Jimmy Shine, Duke's friend, has enlisted in the military although he does not expect to see combat.

In the high school parking lot, Newbomb wears a rubber wolf mask in order to seduce girls, but is recognized and rejected. Afterward, Newbomb performs a song, using the microphone to simulate flatulence until he is chased from the gymnasium.

Simpson is worried that the Knights will disappear, but Wheatly assures him that the club will never die. Later, Newbomb and his buddies urinate in the punch of the Beverly Hills Neighborhood Association Halloween party, the group responsible for Tubby's demise.

Later at Smitty's Speed Shop, a place for repairs and restorations located next door to Tubby's, Duke and a few buddies present Knights' Leader Jimmy Shine with a beautifully restored sports car as a farewell gift. (Also an overlooked mistake at 1:01:20, when Duke asks the color of the car, the answer he's given is: "it's Tony Danza yellow", referring to the actor rather than his character's name. Correcting the previous sentence, he actually says "It's Tony Nancy yellow." The guy says it is Tony Nancy, a car customizer playing himself. [He's listed in the credits.])

As the film comes to an end, Duke admits to Suzie Q that he is afraid of losing her, and she reassures him of her love. The final shot shows the lights of Tubby's being turned off for good.

== Cast ==
- Robert Wuhl as Newbomb Turk
- Tony Danza as Duke
- Fran Drescher as Sally
- Michelle Pfeiffer as Suzie Q
- Leigh French as Jacqueline Freedman
- Glenn Withrow as Shorty
- Randy Gornel as Wheatly
- Gary Graham as Jimmy Shine
- Gailard Sartain as Officer Bimbeau
- Sandy Helberg as Officer Clark
- James Jeter as Smitty
- Stuart Pankin as Dudley Laywicker
- Moosie Drier as Moosie
- P.R. Paul as Simpson
- Julius Averitt as Earle
- Richard Schaal as Nevans
- Steve Ballard as Mechanic
- Gerard Prendergast as Tarzan
- Carol Ann Williams as Jane
- Debra Feuer as Cheetah
- Joyce Hyser as Brenda Weintraub (Iron Box Twin #1)
- Roberta Wallach as Shirley Weintraub (Iron Box Twin #2)
- Michael Binder as Pledge #1
- Joey Camen as Pledge #2
- Daniel Davies as Pledge #3
- Duane LaDage as Pledge #4
- Harold 'Red' Keller as Tubby
- Mina Kolb as Dudley's Mother
- Demetre Phillips as Newbomb's Brother
- Ken Hixon as Dark
- Penny Miller as Dolores
- Michele Drake as Cheerleader
- Pat Hemingway as Carhop
- Chris Somma as Carhop
- Humble Harv Miller as Disc Jockey Doctor J
- Dave Sebastian Williams as Disc Jockey Surf Sam

== Production ==
The filming location for the "Tubby's Drive-In" scenes was an old A&W Root Beer drive-in location that had closed a few years prior at 7310 Van Nuys Blvd, in Los Angeles, California.

Robert Wuhl, Tony Danza and Stuart Pankin all played teenage characters, although Wuhl and Danza were both in their late twenties, and Pankin was 33 years old.

Director Floyd Mutrux revealed on the audio commentary of the Columbia DVD release that he was at one point going to direct Urban Cowboy (1980), and that he would have been likely to cast Michelle Pfeiffer in the role of Sissy. The producer of that film, Robert Evans, also preferred Pfeiffer, but the eventual director, James Bridges, refused to cast anyone but Debra Winger in the part.

== Critical reception ==
The New York Times wrote that "the film is so crazily derivative that for a while it seems to have comic prospects, though they come to nothing in a hurry." The Boston Globe determined that "the episodic litany of nocturnal events never approaches the level of artistry that Lucas achieved in Graffiti... Lucas delved into the personal and social effects of growing up while Mutrux merely reports and repeats." The Globe and Mail concluded that The Hollywood Knights "has enough golden-age nostalgia and simple, slobby humor—handled nicely by a fresh-faced cast—for us to take Hollywood's version of growing up absurd, one more time." In 1991, the Los Angeles Times noted the "wild mugging and corny, violent gags."

The Hollywood Knights holds a 17% rating on Rotten Tomatoes based on seven reviews.

== Legacy ==
Often considered to be a rip-off of American Graffiti, the film is notable for the debut performances of many well-known actors.

- Tony Danza was a cast member of Taxi, but had not yet appeared in a feature film.
- The lead role of Newbomb Turk was former stand-up comic Robert Wuhl's first film performance; he would later win two Emmy Awards in the category of Outstanding Writing in a Variety, Music or Comedy Program for his collaboration with Billy Crystal on the scripts for the 63rd and 64th Academy Awards ceremonies.
- Fran Drescher had appeared in Floyd Mutrux's previous film American Hot Wax, and would achieve greater fame through her sitcom The Nanny.
- The Columbus, Ohio, band New Bomb Turks took their name from the film's protagonist.
- The 1957 Chevy Bel Air 210 driven by Danza and Michelle Pfieffer is a famous project car called Project X that began life as a magazine test mule for Popular Hot Rodding, in 1965. It is now owned by Hot Rod and is still a prominent player in the hot rodding industry. It is considered by many to be the most famous '57 Chevy in history.

== See also ==
- List of films set around Halloween
