= James Jeter =

American film, stage, and television actor

- Jeter in Assault on Precinct 13 (1976)
- Born: September 15, 1921; Star, Texas, U.S.
- Died: March 4, 2007 (aged 85); Houston, Texas, U.S.
- Other name: James Jeeter
- Occupation: Actor
- Years active: 1961–1993

James Jeter (September 15, 1921 – March 4, 2007), also known and credited as James Jeeter, was an American film, stage, and television actor. He was known for playing the recurring role of blacksmith Hans Dorfler in the American historical drama television series Little House on the Prairie.

== Life and career ==
Jeter was born in Star, Texas. He began his career on stage, performing at the Alley Theatre. Jeter made his film debut with an uncredited appearance in the 1964 film The Best Man. He next appeared in the film Kiss Me, Stupid.

Jeter appeared in the 1966 film The Sand Pebbles, in the role of Boatswain's Mate 2nd Class Farren. He then appeared in the 1967 film Cool Hand Luke.

Jeter guest-starred in television programs, including Gunsmoke, Bonanza, Death Valley Days, The Waltons, The Mary Tyler Moore Show, Rawhide, Emergency!, The Rockford Files, Knots Landing, M*A*S*H, Land of the Giants, and The Wild Wild West. He also played the recurring role of "Smitty" in the drama television series Delvecchio, and as the blacksmith Hans Dorfler in Little House on the Prairie from 1974 to 1980.

Jeter appeared in films such as F.I.S.T., The Border, Assault on Precinct 13, Hang 'Em High, Fun with Dick and Jane, The Four Deuces, Ice Station Zebra, A Change of Seasons, The Hollywood Knights, Blow Out, The Christian Licorice Store, and Fast Break. In 1985, Jeter played the lead role at the Geva Theatre Center in the play All My Sons, replacing Gerald Richards, who had been hospitalised. His final credit was for the 1993 film A Perfect World. Jeter worked as a lawyer in California.

== Death ==
Jeter died on March 4, 2007 in Houston, Texas, at the age of 85.

== Filmography ==
Year	Title	Role	Notes
1964	The Best Man	Mayor	Uncredited
1964	Kiss Me, Stupid	Waiter at Desert Sands	Uncredited
1966	The Chase	Man	Uncredited
1966	The Sand Pebbles	Farren	
1967	The Big Mouth	Police Lieutenant	Uncredited
1967	Cool Hand Luke	Wickerman	Uncredited
1968	Hang 'Em High	Wagon Driver	Uncredited
1968	Ice Station Zebra	2nd Barman	Uncredited
1971	The Christian Licorice Store	Texas Man	
1973	Oklahoma Crude	Stapp	
1975	The Four Deuces	Capt. 'Smitty' Baird	
1976	The Big Bus	Bus Bartender	
1976	Assault on Precinct 13	Precinct Captain	Uncredited
1976	Bound for Glory	Crippled Whitey - Hobo (on train)	
1977	Fun with Dick and Jane	Immigration Officer	
1977	Black Sunday	Watchman	
1978	F.I.S.T.	Mike Quinn	
1978	Matilda	ASPCA Attendant #3	
1979	Fast Break	Officer Hedgewood	
1979	The Last Word	Desk Sergeant	
1980	The Great Rock 'n' Roll Swindle	Martin Bormann	Uncredited
1980	The Hollywood Knights	Smitty	
1980	A Change of Seasons	Truck Driver	
1974–1980	Little House on the Prairie	Hans Dorfler	9 episodes
1981	Blow Out	Film Lab Man	
1982	The Border	Frank	
1988	Cohen and Tate	Trooper #1	
1993	A Perfect World	Oldtimer	
