= Star, Texas =

- Unincorporated community
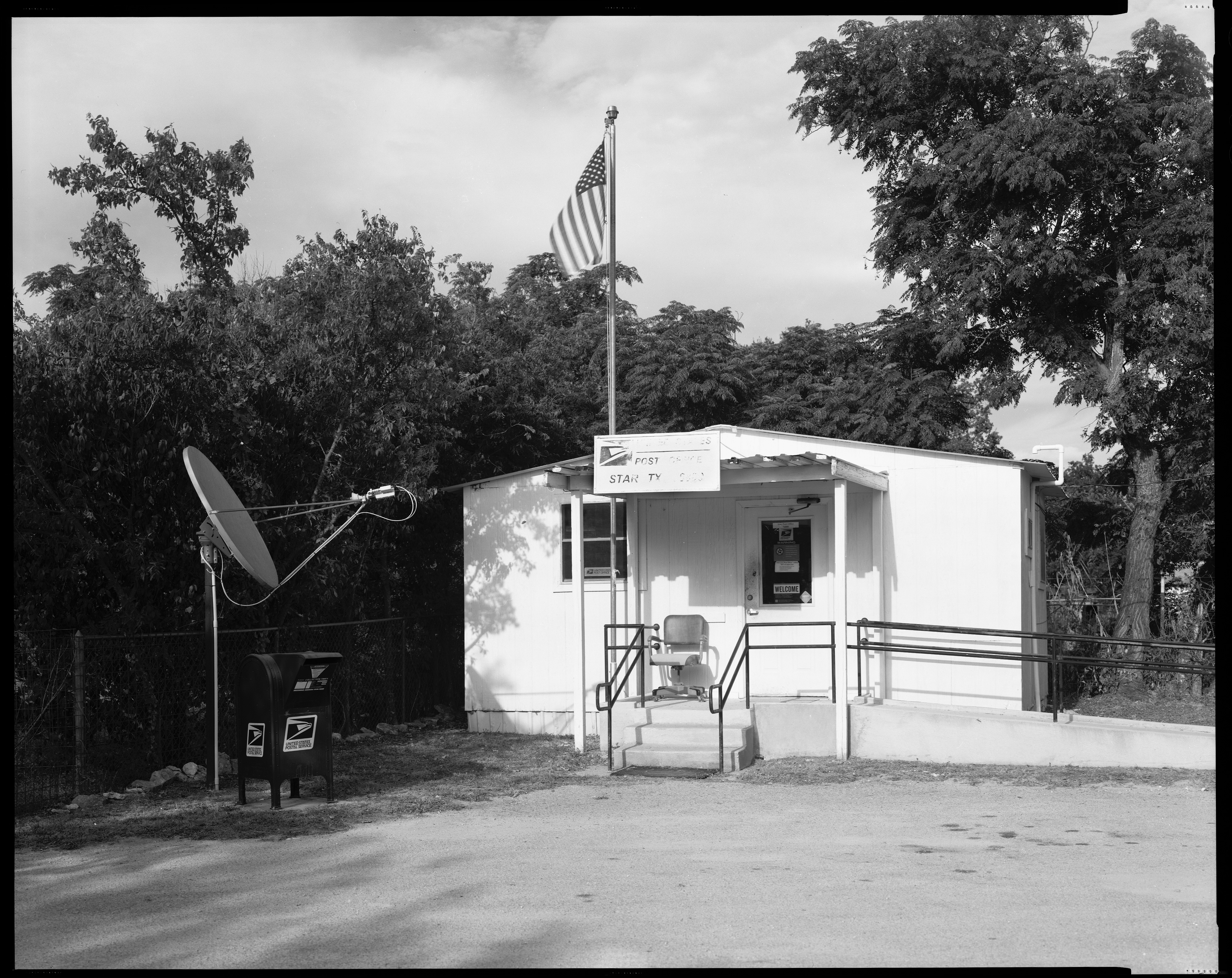
- The Star post office

- Location within Texas Location within the United States
- Coordinates: 31°28′07″N 98°18′58″W
- Country: United States
- State: Texas
- County: Mills
- Elevation: 1,401 ft (427 m)
- Time zone: UTC-6 (Central (CST))
  - Summer (DST): UTC-5 (CDT)
- Area code: 325
- GNIS feature ID: 1369107

Star is an unincorporated community in Mills County in Central Texas, United States. According to the Handbook of Texas, the community had an estimated population of 85 in 2000.

== Geography ==
Star is located at the junction of U.S. Highway 84 and FM 1047 and North Simms Creek in east-central Mills County, east of Goldthwaite and west of Evant. It is located near the Hamilton County line.

=== Climate ===
The climate in this area is characterized by relatively high temperatures and evenly distributed precipitation throughout the year. The Köppen Climate System describes the weather as humid subtropical, and uses the abbreviation Cfa.

== History ==
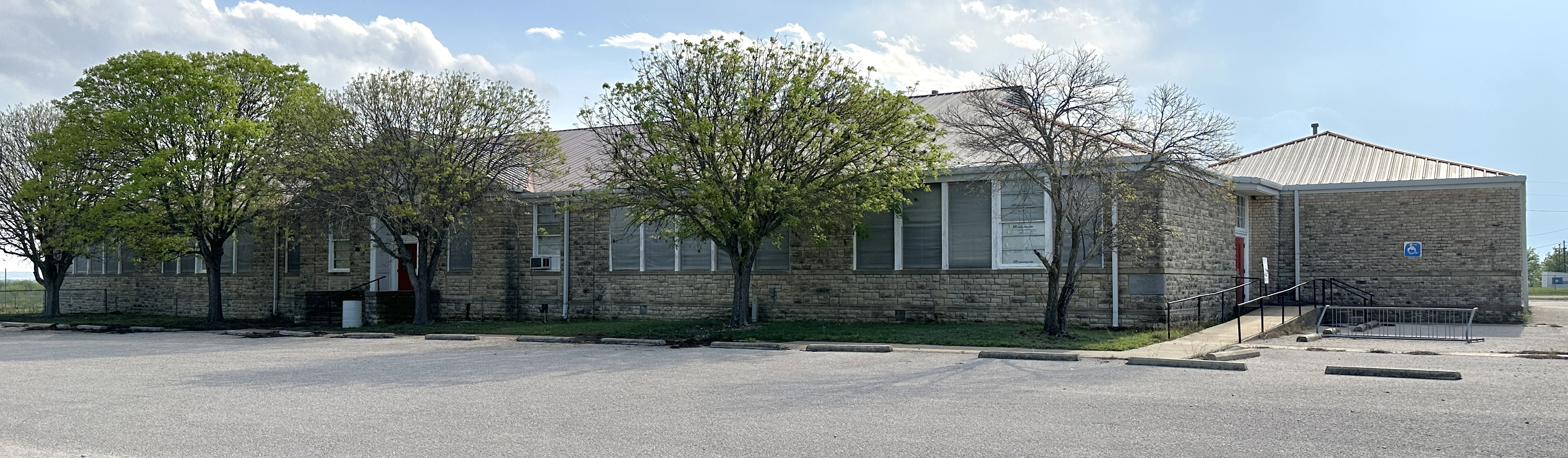
Star School building

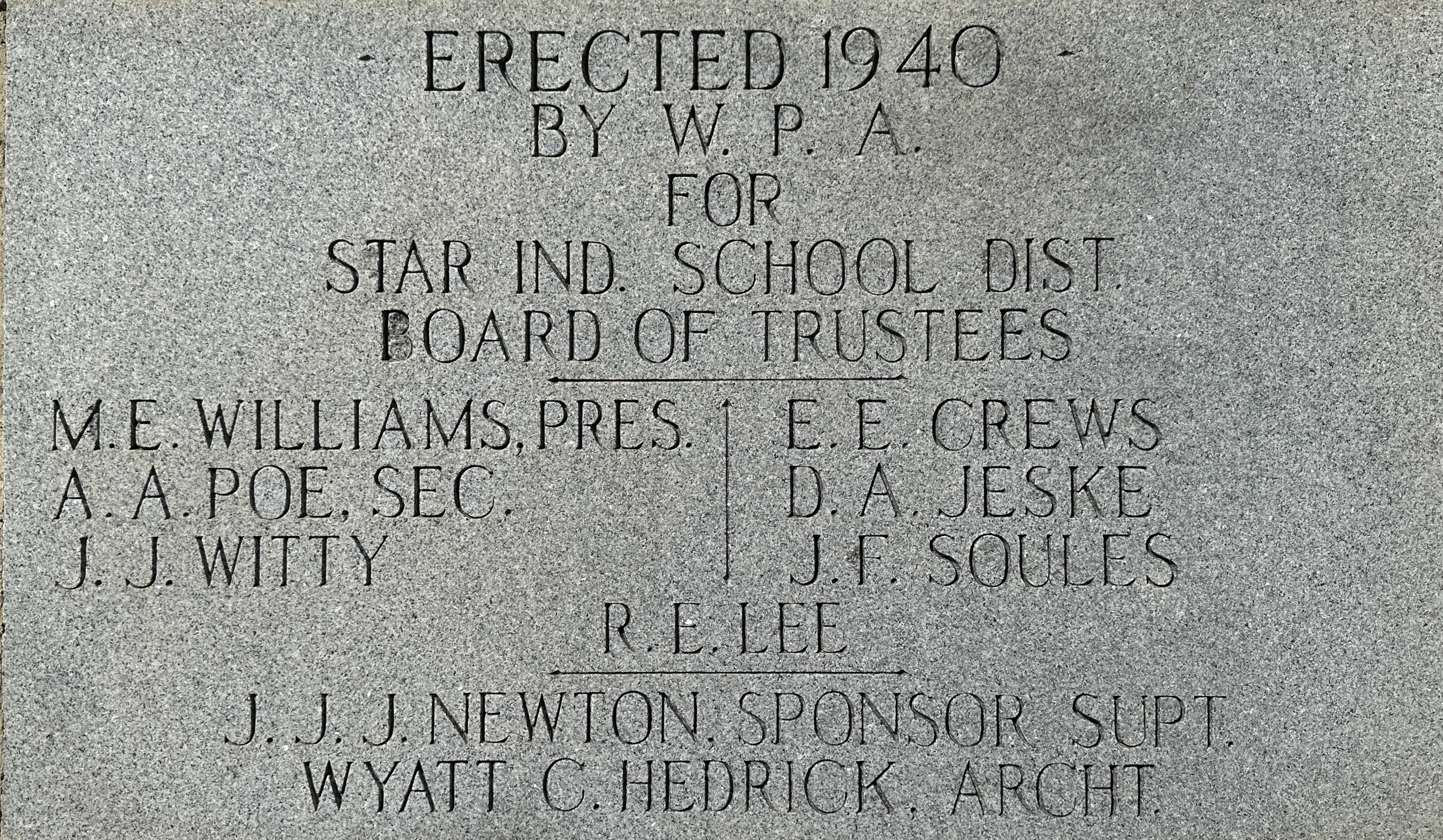
Star School cornerstone

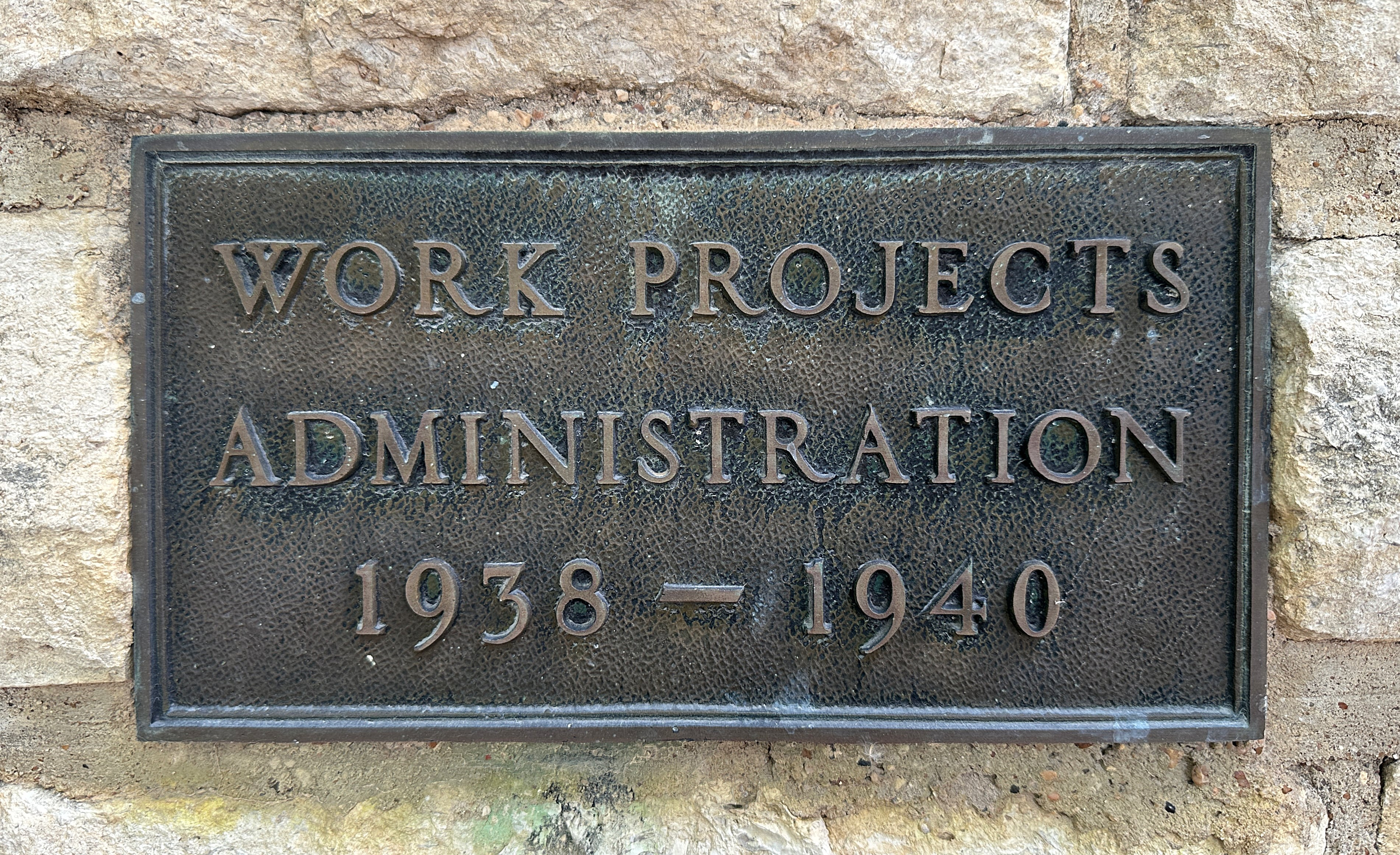
WPA plate fixed to Star School building

The community was laid out by Alec Street in the mid-1880s and was named for nearby Star Mountain. Street ran a store and a gin in the community. A post office was established in 1886 with Calvin Skinner as its first postmaster. In 1890, the first public road opened from Star to Goldthwaite. By 1895, the community had a saloon, several grocery stores, and a drug store. A tornado struck Star on May 5, 1904. Two people were killed and five homes were completely destroyed. The community recovered and a permanent church was built in 1905. In 1910, a bank opened. A four-room, two-story stone school building was completed in 1913. A hailstorm damaged homes, businesses, and the school on April 22, 1924. Star's bank was robbed in 1928 and the robber got away with about $3,000 and several valuables. Four years later, during the Great Depression, the bank was sold to the Trent State Bank in Goldthwaite. By 1939, Star had eight businesses operating in the community. That same year, three area schools – McGirk, Center City, and Hurst Ranch – consolidated with Star. In 1940, the W.P.A. erected a new school designed by Wyatt C. Hedrick for the Star Independent School District; it is the only school built in Mills County by the W.P.A. The population stood at around 170 in the mid-1940s. The rising usage of the automobile caused a decline in the number of local businesses. By 1980, the community had an estimated population of 85. That figure remained steady through 2000. It went up to 110 in 2010.

Although Star is unincorporated, it does have a post office with the zip code 76880.

Star, Texas, Postmasters
Name	Location	Appointment Date
William Ellis Reid	Star, Hamilton, Texas	5 Aug 1884
Henry Campbell	Star, Hamilton, Texas	3 Nov 1885
Calvin Skinner	Star, Hamilton, Texas	26 Jul 1886
Elliott A. Street	Star, Hamilton, Texas	20 Jul 1892
Elliott A. Street	Star, Mills, Texas	20 Jul 1892
Cademus K. Jones	Star, Mills, Texas	5 Dec 1895
Ulysses E. G. Dyer	Star, Mills, Texas	23 Jan 1902
Robert W. Garrett	Star, Mills, Texas	4 Nov 1903
Robert W. Barr	Star, Mills, Texas	24 Feb 1912
David J. Hawkins	Star, Mills, Texas	25 Sep 1913
Wm A. Hawking	Star, Mills, Texas	15 Oct 1915
Joseph D. Tumlinson	Star, Mills, Texas	21 Mar 1918
Frances M. Brooking	Star, Mills, Texas	14 Jun 1919
Bina Weathers	Star, Mills, Texas	18 Nov 1920
Fulton F. Henry	Star, Mills, Texas	7 Apr 1921 acting
Fulton F. Henry	Star, Mills, Texas	12 Jan 1922 appointed
Dan Waggoner	Star, Mills, Texas	8 Aug 1922 (acting – resigned)
R. Q. Manning	Star, Mills, Texas	8 Aug 1922 acting
R. Q. Manning	Star, Mills, Texas	26 Dec 1922 appointed
Richard Q. Manning	Star, Mills, Texas	9 Feb 1924 appointed
Artie Rickel	Star, Mills, Texas	11 Feb 1925 acting
Artie Rickel	Star, Mills, Texas	6 Jan 1926 appointed
Dan Waggoner	Star, Mills, Texas	5 Oct 1929 acting
Dan Waggoner	Star, Mills, Texas	22 Oct 1929 appointed
Daniel Wagoner	Star, Mills, Texas	3 Oct 1930 appointed
Miss Hattie Barr	Star, Mills, Texas	17 Jan 1936 acting
Miss Hattie J. Barr	Star, Mills, Texas	31 Jul 1936 confirmed
Mrs. Burt Ball	Star, Mills, Texas	1 Oct 1942 acting
Mrs. Burt C. Ball	Star, Mills, Texas	20 Apr 1943 confirmed
Mrs. Rose L. Soules (Sheldon)	Star, Mills, Texas	30 Jun 1955 acting
Mrs. Rose L. McCasland (Sheldon)	Star, Mills, Texas	5 Aug 1957 appointed
Cleta C. Hunt	Star, Mills, Texas	27 Aug 1988 OIC
Cleta C. Hunt	Star, Mills, Texas	18 Sep 1993 appointed
Ivory L. Goff	Star, Mills, Texas	26 Feb 1999 OIC
Jennifer D. Smith	Star, Mills, Texas	22 May 1999 appointed
Kay Sherwood	Star, Mills, Texas	6 Sep 2001 OIC
Lynette K. Franke	Star, Mills, Texas	17 Nov 2001 appointed
Cindy Powers	Star, Mills, Texas	19 Mar 2004 OIC
Kay S. Sherwood (Joyce Kay Sutherland)	Star, Mills, Texas	24 Jul 2004 appointed

== Education ==
The community of Star is served by the Star Independent School District and is home to the Star School Tigers.

== Notable person ==
- James Jeter, actor, was born in Star.
