= Goldthwaite High School =

Coordinates: 31.4539°N 98.5777°W

Location
- 1509 Hannah Valley Rd; Goldthwaite, Texas 76844; United States

Information
- School type: Public high school
- School district: Goldthwaite Independent School District
- Principal: Michael Sanderson
- Staff: 22.29 (FTE)
- Grades: 9–12
- Enrollment: 178 (2023–2024)
- Student to teacher ratio: 7.99
- Colors: Black & Gold
- Athletics conference: UIL Class 2A
- Mascot: Eagle
- Website: Goldthwaite High School

Goldthwaite High School is a 2A public high school located in Goldthwaite, Texas, United States. It is part of the Goldthwaite Consolidated Independent School District located in central Mills County. In 2011, the school was rated "Recognized" by the Texas Education Agency.

== Athletics ==
The Goldthwaite Eagles compete in the following sports:

- Cross Country
- Football
- Basketball
- Golf
- Track
- Softball
- Baseball

=== State titles ===
- Football –
  - 1985(1A), 1993(2A), 1994(2A), 2009(1A/D1)
- Boys Track –
  - 1966(1A)
- One Act Play –
  - 1967(1A)

Boys Golf 2019 (2A)

==== State finalists ====
- Football –
  - 1992(2A)
  - 2010(1A)
- One Act Play –
  - 1989–90(2A) –
  - 1988–89(2A)
