= Star Independent School District =

School district in Texas

Star Independent School District was a public school district based in the community of Star, Texas, USA.

Located in Mills County, the district extended into portions of Hamilton and Lampasas counties.

It was about 75 miles (121 km) west of Waco. Star ISD had one school, Star School, that served students in grades kindergarten through twelve.

== History ==
The Center City, Hurst Ranch, McGirk, Moline, Payne Gap, Plainview, and Pleasant Grove schools consolidated into Star City in the period 1930 through 1938.

Beginning circa 2006 the district experienced a decline in enrollment and funding. In 2013 the district had 56 students; the State of Texas reduces funding if a school district's enrollment is fewer than 90 students. That year the district's closure was announced. The final superintendent, Barbara Marchbanks, stated that parents leaving the area to find other jobs caused enrollment to decline. The district was consolidated with the Goldthwaite Independent School District effective July 1, 2014.
