= Kalgary, Texas =

- Unincorporated community
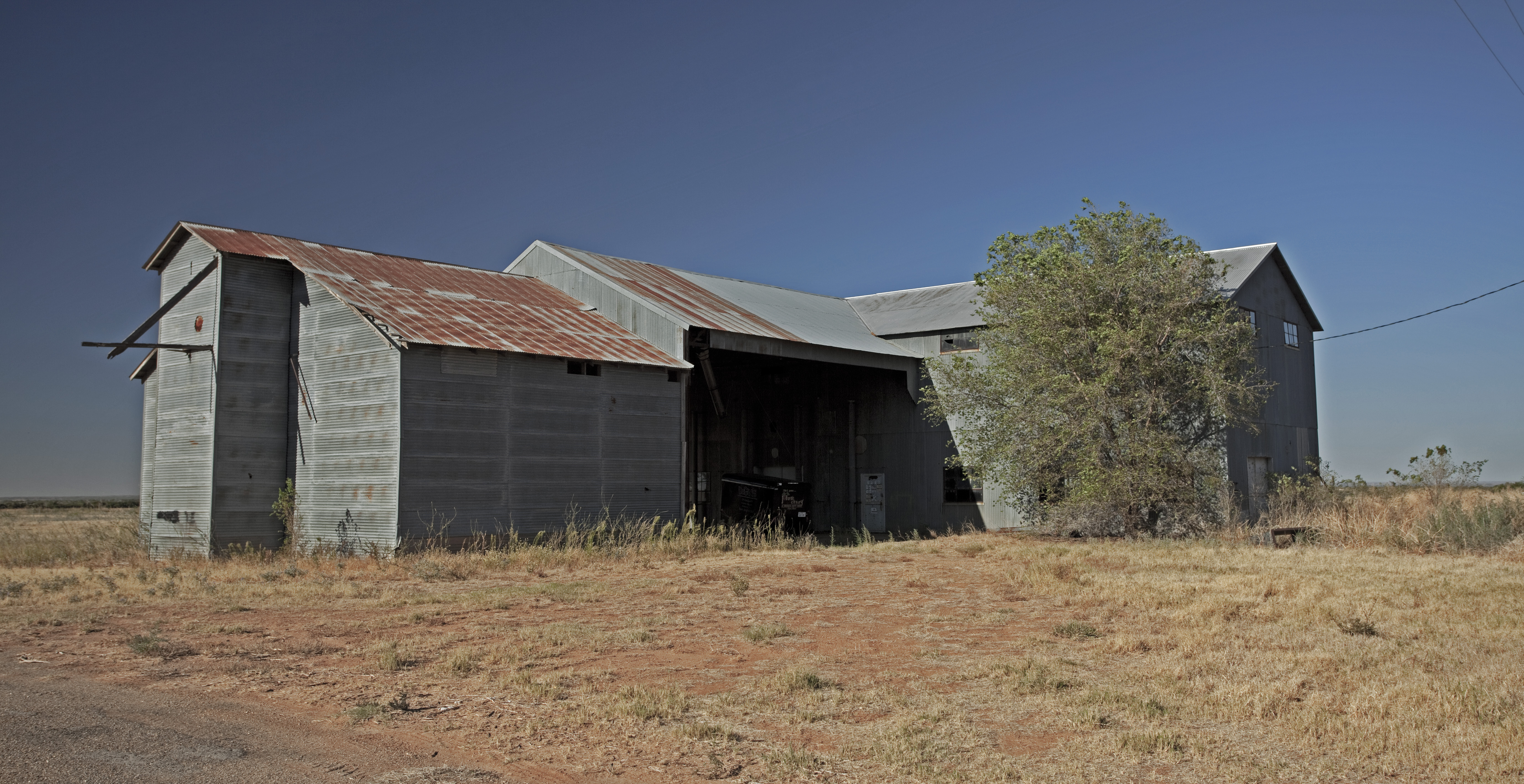
- Abandoned cotton gin in Kalgary

- Location within Texas Location within the United States
- Coordinates: 33°24′32″N 101°08′55″W
- Country: United States
- State: Texas
- Counties: Crosby
- Elevation: 2,503 ft (763 m)
- Time zone: UTC-6 (Central (CST))
  - Summer (DST): UTC-5 (CDT)
- ZIP code: 79370
- Area code: 806
- GNIS feature ID: 1380019
- Website: Handbook of Texas

Kalgary is an unincorporated community in Crosby County, Texas, United States. According to the Handbook of Texas, the community had an estimated population of 70 in 2000. Kalgary is part of the Lubbock metropolitan area.

== History ==
The community was established around 1905 when E.P. Swenson started selling portions of his 437,670-acre (1,771.2 km^{2}) SMS Ranch. Originally known as Spur, the community became known as Watson, after early settler Richard Watson Self. A post office opened in 1911, but closed two years later. It reopened in 1925, then closed for good in 1955. In 1927, the community's name was changed from Watson to Kalgary after another community named Watson was found to be in the state. By the early 1930s, Kalgary was home to about 10 residents. That figure rose to 100 in 1940. At that time, three stores and a gin were operating in the community. During the latter half of the 20th century, the population was estimated to be around 140. That number had decreased to 70 by 2000. It further decreased to 6 in 2010.

It was named for the city of Calgary, in Alberta, Canada.

Paleontologist Ermine Cowles Case found the pelvis of a Postosuchus fossil in Kalgary.

Although Kalgary has experienced both population and economic decline in recent years, local folk-hero meteorologist John Robison from Lubbock TV station KCBD has made it his mission to bring increased visibility and attention to the town by excessively mentioning it on-air during severe weather events, promoting the dream that it will become a prosperous exurb of Lubbock in the near-future and a global tourist destination.

== Geography ==
Kalgary is situated along Farm to Market Road 261 in southeastern Crosby County, about 55 miles (89 km) southeast of Lubbock and 21 mi (34 km) south of Crosbyton. It is located within the rolling plains along a drainage divide that separates the White River and the Salt Fork Brazos River, both tributaries of the Brazos River. It is also on McDonald Creek and Farm to Market Roads 2008 and 651.

=== Climate ===
According to the Köppen climate classification system, Kalgary has a semiarid climate, BSk on climate maps.

== Education ==
Watson School was built in 1907. Nichols was the main instructor. In 1949, the local school district - known as Self County Line – joined the nearby Crosbyton Consolidated Independent School District. No more classes were held in Kalgary after an October 1952 fire destroyed the local school.
