= Star School (Texas) =

Star High School

Location
- 64 South FM 1047; Star, Texas 76880; United States; 31.464494°N 98.317409°W

Information
- School type: Public high school
- School district: Star Independent School District
- Principal: David Marchbanks
- Grades: K-12
- Enrollment: 57 (2010)
- Colors: Red and black
- Athletics conference: UIL Class A
- Mascot: Tigers/Lady Tigers
- Website: Star High School website

Star High School or Star School is a 1A public high school located in Star, Texas, United States. It is part of the Star Independent School District located in east central Mills County. The school has all grades (K-12) in one building with students attending from portions of Hamilton and Lampasas counties along with Star. In 2011, the school was rated "academically acceptable" by the Texas Education Agency. Star School is scheduled to be consolidated with a neighboring district after the 2013–14 school year.

== Athletics ==
- Basketball
- 6-man American football

== See also ==
- List of high schools in Texas
