= Fun with Dick and Jane (1977 film) =

1977 film by Ted Kotcheff

- Theatrical release poster
- Directed by: Ted Kotcheff
- Screenplay by: David Giler; Jerry Belson; Mordecai Richler
- Story by: Gerald Gaiser
- Produced by: Peter Bart; Max Palevsky
- Starring: George Segal; Jane Fonda; Ed McMahon
- Cinematography: Fred J. Koenekamp
- Edited by: Danford B. Greene
- Music by: Ernest Gold
- Distributed by: Columbia Pictures
- Release date: February 9, 1977
- Running time: 99 minutes
- Country: United States
- Language: English
- Budget: $4.5 million
- Box office: $13.6 million (US and Canada rentals)

Fun with Dick and Jane is a 1977 American crime screwball comedy directed by Ted Kotcheff and starring George Segal and Jane Fonda. The film follows an upper-middle-class couple who resort to robberies after the husband unexpectedly loses his job, desperate to maintain their lifestyle.

The character names come from the Dick and Jane series of children's educational books, and the film takes its title from one of the books in the series.

Fun with Dick and Jane was released by Columbia Pictures on February 9, 1977. The film received mixed reviews from critics and grossed $13.6 million against a $4.5 million budget.

== Plot ==
Dick Harper, a successful aerospace engineer at Taft Aerospace, and his stay-at-home wife Jane are an upper-middle-class couple who live in a suburban home with their son Billy and enjoy a comfortable lifestyle. However, their lives are upended when Dick's boss, Charlie Blanchard, unexpectedly fires him due to the financial decline of the aerospace industry. As a result, their newly installed swimming pool remains unfinished in the backyard, and their new lawn is repossessed by the landscape crew. With no savings or life insurance, Dick and Jane have been living beyond their means, and owe $77,000 on the house.

Their attempts to find other gainful employment backfire. Jane is hired as a model at an upscale department store, but during a fashion show, she falls against a food cart, causing a chain reaction that ultimately sets two tables on fire. Dick invites a prospective employer from another aerospace company to lunch at the Harper home, but just when he is about to get hired, the landscape contractor shows up outside with a megaphone and demands that the Harpers return their indoor plants.

Dick applies for unemployment insurance and food stamps. At the unemployment office, he runs into a former Taft Aerospace janitor who gets them both under-the-table jobs as background actors in a local opera production, but the unemployment office clerk, who is in the audience, recognizes Dick under the makeup and disqualifies him from unemployment for the next three years. When Jane reluctantly visits her wealthy parents to borrow money, her father suggests that she and Dick view this experience as an opportunity for growth.

Dick and Jane visit a small loan office and are offered $1,000 per year at 18-and-a-half percent interest. Shortly afterwards, two armed robbers hold up the office. As the police arrive, the robbers drag Jane out the back door before fleeing during a shootout with the police. Returning home, Jane reveals to Dick that she grabbed $2,000 the robbers dropped. Deciding to keep the money, they pay the electricity bill and splurge on an expensive dinner at home. During the dinner, the food stamp inspector arrives at the house. Despite their extravagant dinner and expensive house, the Harpers are eligible for the food stamp program.

Dick plans an armed robbery and convinces Jane to be his getaway driver. After a few failed attempts, Dick successfully robs a sleazy motel, a record store, a restaurant, and the local phone company office, which makes the angry customers waiting in line cheer the Harpers on. Now rich, Dick and Jane throw a party to show their old friends, including Charlie Blanchard, their new swimming pool and lawn.

Attending a sermon by an evangelist, Dick and Jane rob him of his collections. The evangelist chases them in his van, and as a police car joins the chase, Jane tosses some of the money out the window. People run into the street to grab the money, blocking the police and the evangelist. At home, the Harpers consider quitting their life of crime, before they see Charlie on television, testifying in front of a congressional committee investigating aerospace corporation payoffs. Realizing that Charlie keeps $200,000 in his office as a slush fund (used to pay off lawmakers), Dick and Jane decide to rob Charlie.

At a Taft Aerospace party, Dick and Jane break into Charlie's office, crack the safe, and steal the money. They return to the party, but a security guard alerts Charlie before the couple can leave. Dick admits to Charlie that he and Jane have stolen his money, before revealing that they have called the police to report the robbery. Knowing that the $200,000 might lead to further unwanted investigations, Charlie tells the arriving police that no crime was committed and lets the couple leave with the money.

A press release announces that Dick has been hired as president of Taft Aerospace, after Charlie has resigned.

== Cast ==
- George Segal as Dick Harper
- Jane Fonda as Jane Harper
- Ed McMahon as Charlie Blanchard
- Dick Gautier as Dr. Will
- Allan Miller as loan company manager
- Hank Garcia as Raoul Esteban
- John Dehner as Jane's father
- Walter Brooke as Mr. Weeks
- Sean Frye as Billy
- Mary Jackson as Jane's mother
- James Jeter as immigration officer
- Maxine Stuart as Charlie's secretary
- Fred Willard as Bob
- Selma Archerd as Beverly Hills matron
- John Brandon as Pete Winston
- Burke Byrnes as Roger
- Thayer David as Deacon
- Jon Christian Erickson as transsexual
- Art Evans as man at bar
- Richard Foronjy as landscape man
- Harry Holcombe as pharmacist
- DeWayne Jessie as robber
- Anne Ramsey as employment applicant
- Thalmus Rasulala as food stamp man
- Gloria Stroock as Mildred Blanchard
- James Reynolds as Johnson (uncredited), the income maintenance technician
- Jay Leno as carpenter (uncredited)

== Production ==
Principal photography began on December 30, 1975, in Los Angeles and lasted 43 days. Filming also took place at a home in the Benedict Hills area of Beverly Hills, California.

== Reception ==
Fun with Dick and Jane was Columbia's third-highest-grossing film of 1977 in the United States, with rentals returned from the United States and Canada of $13.6 million.

The film received mixed reviews from critics. On the review aggregator website Rotten Tomatoes, the film holds an approval rating of 57% based on 14 reviews, with an average rating of 6.4/10.

Roger Ebert of the Chicago Sun-Times gave the film 2.5 out of 4 and wrote: "This stuff is funny enough, but somehow it's too easy. It's situation comedy, when the movie's earlier moments seemed to be promising us a hard-boiled commentary..."

== Remake ==
A remake of the film was released in 2005, starring Jim Carrey and Téa Leoni.
