= Goldthwaite Municipal Airport =

Municipal airport in Goldthwaite, Texas, United States

- IATA: none; ICAO: none; FAA LID: T37

Summary
- Airport type: Public
- Owner: City of Goldthwaite
- Serves: Goldthwaite, Texas
- Elevation AMSL: 1,457.0 ft (444.1 m)
- Coordinates: 31°25′45″N 098°36′30″W

Map
- Location within Texas

Runways
Direction	Length		Surface
Direction	ft	m	Surface
01/19	3,200	975	Asphalt

Statistics (2017)
- Aircraft operations: 2,700
- Based aircraft: 9
- Sources: Federal Aviation Administration except as noted

Goldthwaite Municipal Airport (FAA LID: T37) is a public airport in Goldthwaite, Mills County, Texas, United States, located 2 nautical miles (3.7 km) southwest of the central business district. The airport has no IATA or ICAO designation.

The airport is used solely for general aviation purposes.

== History ==
The airport originally opened in 2011. In 2015, 10 T-hangars, a hangar apron, an access road, and a garage storage area for a courtesy car were constructed, and a fly-in golf program was offered in partnership with the adjacent golf course.

== Facilities ==
Goldthwaite Municipal Airport covers 62 acres (25 ha) at an elevation of 1,457.0 feet (444.1 m) above mean sea level (AMSL), and has one runway:

- Runway 01/19: 3,200 x 60 ft. (975 x 18 m), Surface: Asphalt

For the 12-month period ending 13 September 2017, the airport had 2,700 aircraft operations, an average of 7 per day: 100% general aviation. At that time there were 9 aircraft based at this airport, all single-engine, with no multi-engine, ultralights, helicopters, jets, or gliders.

== See also ==
- List of airports in Texas
