= James Lynaugh Unit =

State prison for men located in Texas

Coordinates: 30°47′21″N 103°02′59″W

- Interactive map of James Lynaugh Unit
- Location: 1098 South Highway 2037 Fort Stockton, Texas
- Status: open
- Security class: G1, G2, G4
- Capacity: 1416
- Opened: September 1994
- Managed by: Texas Department of Criminal Justice

The James Lynaugh Unit is a state prison for men located in Fort Stockton, Pecos County, Texas, owned by operated by the Texas Department of Criminal Justice. It opened in September 1994, and has a maximum capacity of 1416 male inmates at various security levels.
