= Goldthwaite Consolidated Independent School District =

Public school district in Texas, U.S.

Goldthwaite Consolidated Independent School District is a public school district based in Goldthwaite, Texas, United States.

In 2009, the school district was rated "academically acceptable" by the Texas Education Agency.

On July 1, 2014 Star Independent School District consolidated into Goldthwaite ISD.

== Schools ==
- Goldthwaite High School (Grades 9–12)
- Goldthwaite Middle School (Grades 6–8)
- Goldthwaite Elementary School (Grades PK–5)
