= Niederwald, Texas =

- City
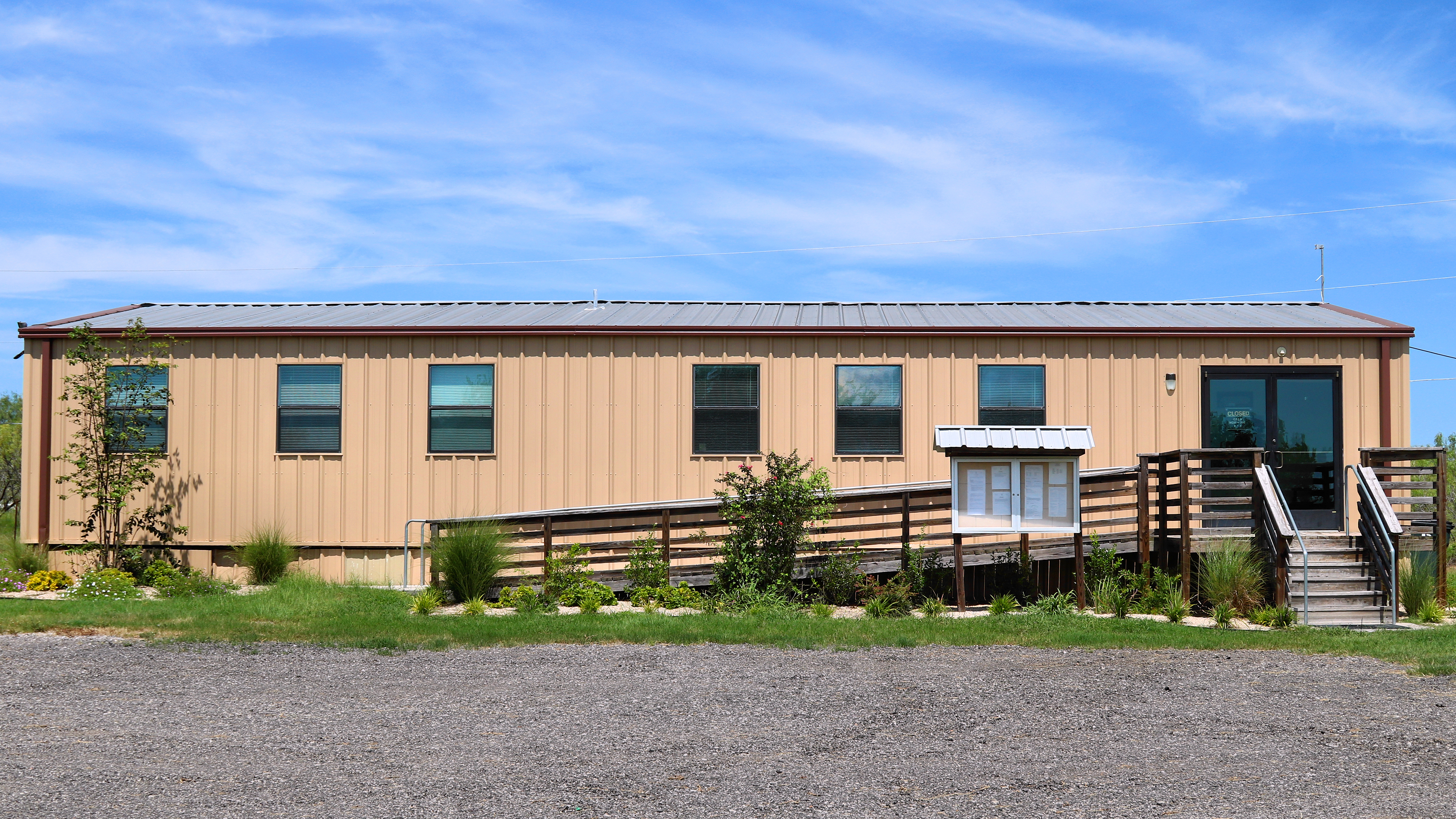
- Niederwald City Hall

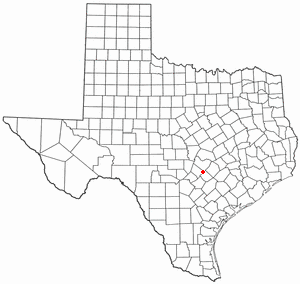
- Location of Niederwald, Texas

- Coordinates: 30°00′23″N 97°45′00″W
- Country: United States
- State: Texas
- Counties: Hays, Caldwell
- Incorporated: 1987

Area
  - Total: 3.67 sq mi (9.50 km^{2})
  - Land: 3.67 sq mi (9.50 km^{2})
  - Water: 0 sq mi (0.00 km^{2})
- Elevation: 574 ft (175 m)

Population (2020)
  - Total: 668
  - Estimate (2025): 1,168
  - Density: 182/sq mi (70.3/km^{2})
- Time zone: UTC-6 (Central (CST))
  - Summer (DST): UTC-5 (CDT)
- ZIP code: 78640
- Area code: 512
- FIPS code: 48-51492
- GNIS feature ID: 2411256
- Website: niederwald.texas.gov

Niederwald is a city in Caldwell and Hays counties in the U.S. state of Texas. The population was 668 at the 2020 census. Niederwald means "low forest", or "low wood", in German. It was named Niederwald by the German founders of the town. This region of Central Texas was settled in the 1800s primarily by Germans and European emigrants and is referred to as the Texas-German belt by locals.

== Geography ==
Niederwald is located in eastern Hays County and northern Caldwell County. Texas State Highway 21 is the main road, leading southwest 15 miles (24 km) to San Marcos and east 26 miles (42 km) to Bastrop. Austin is 24 miles (39 km) to the north.

According to the United States Census Bureau, the town has a total area of 3.7 square miles (9.5 km^{2}). None of the area is covered with water.

== Demographics ==
Historical population
Census	Pop.	Note	%±
1990	233		—
2000	584		150.6%
2010	565		−3.3%
2020	668		18.2%
2025 (est.)	1,168		74.9%
U.S. Decennial Census

=== 2020 census ===
As of the 2020 census, Niederwald had a population of 668. The median age was 40.3 years. 25.6% of residents were under the age of 18 and 15.1% of residents were 65 years of age or older. For every 100 females there were 94.2 males, and for every 100 females age 18 and over there were 91.9 males age 18 and over.

0.0% of residents lived in urban areas, while 100.0% lived in rural areas.

There were 218 households in Niederwald, of which 51.4% had children under the age of 18 living in them. Of all households, 55.5% were married-couple households, 12.8% were households with a male householder and no spouse or partner present, and 22.0% were households with a female householder and no spouse or partner present. About 9.2% of all households were made up of individuals and 4.1% had someone living alone who was 65 years of age or older.

There were 231 housing units, of which 5.6% were vacant. The homeowner vacancy rate was 0.0% and the rental vacancy rate was 3.2%.

Racial composition as of the 2020 census
Race	Number	Percent
White	335	50.1%
Black or African American	17	2.5%
American Indian and Alaska Native	11	1.6%
Asian	4	0.6%
Native Hawaiian and Other Pacific Islander	1	0.1%
Some other race	133	19.9%
Two or more races	167	25.0%
Hispanic or Latino (of any race)	378	56.6%

=== 2000 census ===
At the 2000 census there were 584 people.192 households, and 158 families in the city. The population density was 196.8 inhabitants per square mile (76.0/km^{2}). There were 199 housing units at an average density of 67.1 per square mile (25.9/km^{2}). The racial makeup of the town was 75.17% White, 3.94% African American, 1.54% Native American, 1.37% Asian, 16.44% from other races, and 1.54% from two or more races. Hispanic or Latino of any race were 32.19%.

Of the 192 households 44.3% had children under the age of 18 living with them, 67.7% were married couples living together, 8.3% had a female householder with no husband present, and 17.7% were non-families. 10.4% of households were one person and 2.6% were one person aged 65 or older. The average household size was 3.04 and the average family size was 3.27.

The age distribution was 28.8% under the age of 18, 8.6% from 18 to 24, 35.3% from 25 to 44, 21.6% from 45 to 64, and 5.8% 65 or older. The median age was 34 years. For every 100 females, there were 104.2 males. For every 100 females age 18 and over, there were 101.9 males.

The median household income was $54,375 and the median family income was $61,750. Males had a median income of $28,750 versus $26,932 for females. The per capita income for the town was $21,236. None of the families and 1.8% of the population were living below the poverty line, including no under eighteens and 2.5% of those over 64.
