= Goldthwaite, Texas =

- City
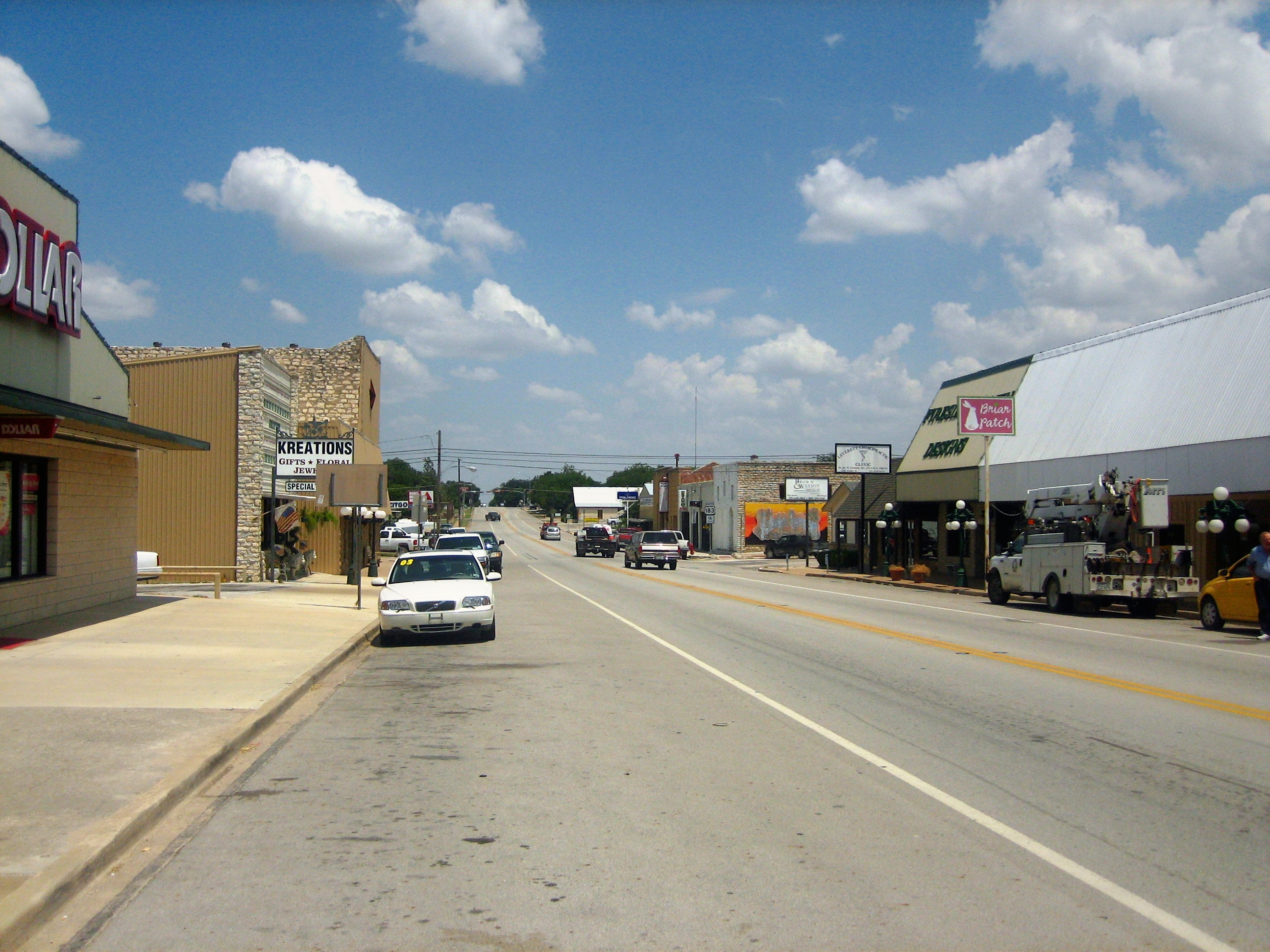
- Downtown Goldthwaite
- Nickname: Windmill City
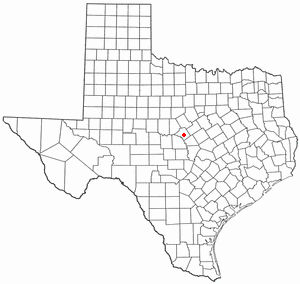
- Location of Goldthwaite, Texas

- Coordinates: 31°27′05″N 98°34′25″W
- Country: United States
- State: Texas
- County: Mills
- Established: 1885

Area
  - Total: 2.07 sq mi (5.35 km^{2})
  - Land: 2.02 sq mi (5.23 km^{2})
  - Water: 0.046 sq mi (0.12 km^{2})
- Elevation: 1,558 ft (475 m)

Population (2020)
  - Total: 1,738
  - Density: 861/sq mi (332/km^{2})
- Time zone: UTC-6 (Central (CST))
  - Summer (DST): UTC-5 (CDT)
- ZIP code: 76844
- Area code: 325
- FIPS code: 48-30056
- GNIS feature ID: 2410614
- Website: Official website

Goldthwaite is a town in and the county seat of Mills County, Texas, United States. Its population was 1,738 at the 2020 census, down from 1,878 at the 2010 census.

== History ==
Goldthwaite existed as a small village prior to the arrival of the Gulf, Colorado and Santa Fe Railway in 1885. The population increased after the railway began selling lots. The town is named after George (Joe) Goldthwaite (1836–1892), an employee at the railway. Goldthwaite was once known as "the City of Windmills" because of the large number of water wells in the city; by around 1900, almost every household had one.

According to the United States Census Bureau, the city has a total area of 1.7 square miles (4.4 km^{2}), all land.

== Geography ==
=== Climate ===
The climate in this area is characterized by hot, humid summers and generally mild to cool winters. According to the Köppen climate classification, Goldthwaite has a humid subtropical climate, Cfa on climate maps.

Climate data for Goldthwaite, Texas, 1991–2020 normals, extremes 1960–present
Month	Jan	Feb	Mar	Apr	May	Jun	Jul	Aug	Sep	Oct	Nov	Dec	Year
Record high °F (°C)	88 (31)	98 (37)	98 (37)	99 (37)	104 (40)	108 (42)	109 (43)	110 (43)	108 (42)	99 (37)	91 (33)	86 (30)	110 (43)
Mean maximum °F (°C)	77.5 (25.3)	80.3 (26.8)	85.4 (29.7)	90.3 (32.4)	94.3 (34.6)	96.5 (35.8)	99.8 (37.7)	99.9 (37.7)	96.2 (35.7)	90.7 (32.6)	82.8 (28.2)	77.0 (25.0)	101.7 (38.7)
Mean daily maximum °F (°C)	58.0 (14.4)	61.7 (16.5)	68.9 (20.5)	76.2 (24.6)	82.5 (28.1)	89.1 (31.7)	92.9 (33.8)	93.3 (34.1)	87.4 (30.8)	78.0 (25.6)	67.1 (19.5)	59.3 (15.2)	76.2 (24.6)
Daily mean °F (°C)	45.5 (7.5)	49.5 (9.7)	56.7 (13.7)	64.4 (18.0)	71.9 (22.2)	78.7 (25.9)	81.8 (27.7)	82.1 (27.8)	76.3 (24.6)	66.3 (19.1)	55.4 (13.0)	47.4 (8.6)	64.7 (18.2)
Mean daily minimum °F (°C)	33.0 (0.6)	37.4 (3.0)	44.5 (6.9)	52.6 (11.4)	61.3 (16.3)	68.3 (20.2)	70.7 (21.5)	70.9 (21.6)	65.1 (18.4)	54.7 (12.6)	43.8 (6.6)	35.4 (1.9)	53.1 (11.8)
Mean minimum °F (°C)	19.1 (−7.2)	22.1 (−5.5)	27.4 (−2.6)	35.7 (2.1)	46.7 (8.2)	60.3 (15.7)	66.2 (19.0)	65.0 (18.3)	52.0 (11.1)	37.1 (2.8)	26.5 (−3.1)	20.9 (−6.2)	15.8 (−9.0)
Record low °F (°C)	4 (−16)	0 (−18)	8 (−13)	28 (−2)	32 (0)	50 (10)	57 (14)	53 (12)	40 (4)	24 (−4)	12 (−11)	−7 (−22)	−7 (−22)
Average precipitation inches (mm)	1.70 (43)	2.23 (57)	2.42 (61)	2.23 (57)	4.21 (107)	4.16 (106)	1.82 (46)	2.01 (51)	2.51 (64)	3.49 (89)	2.06 (52)	1.60 (41)	30.44 (774)
Average precipitation days (≥ 0.01 in)	5.9	6.0	7.0	5.5	7.5	6.2	4.2	5.1	5.0	5.9	5.5	5.7	69.5
Source 1: NOAA
Source 2: National Weather Service

== Demographics ==
Historical population
Census	Pop.	Note	%±
1900	1,282		—
1910	1,129		−11.9%
1920	1,214		7.5%
1930	1,324		9.1%
1940	1,414		6.8%
1950	1,566		10.7%
1960	1,383		−11.7%
1970	1,693		22.4%
1980	1,783		5.3%
1990	1,658		−7.0%
2000	1,802		8.7%
2010	1,878		4.2%
2020	1,738		−7.5%
U.S. Decennial Census

=== 2020 census ===
As of the 2020 census, Goldthwaite had a population of 1,738, and the median age was 45.9 years. The same data show that 21.5% of residents were under 18 years of age and 24.6% were 65 or older, while there were 89.7 males for every 100 females and 85.0 males for every 100 females 18 and over.

All of Goldthwaite's residents were counted in rural areas, with 0.0% living in urban areas and 100.0% living in rural areas.

There were 692 households in Goldthwaite, of which 30.2% had children under 18 living in them. Married couples accounted for 47.1% of all households, 14.2% were headed by a male householder without a spouse or partner present, and 34.2% were headed by a female householder without a spouse or partner present. Individuals made up 32.8% of households, and 17.8% had somebody living alone who was 65 years of age or older.

The city contained 869 housing units, 20.4% of which were vacant. The homeowner vacancy rate stood at 5.1% while the rental vacancy rate was 10.5%.

Racial composition as of the 2020 census
Race	Number	Percent
White	1,326	76.3%
Black or African American	8	0.5%
American Indian and Alaska Native	10	0.6%
Asian	3	0.2%
Native Hawaiian and Other Pacific Islander	0	0.0%
Some other race	171	9.8%
Two or more races	220	12.7%
Hispanic or Latino (of any race)	452	26.0%

=== 2000 census ===
At the 2000 census, 1,802 people, 740 households and 466 families lived in the city. The population density was 1,047.4 inhabitants per square mile (404.4/km^{2}). The 883 housing units had an average density of 513.2 per square mile (198.1/km^{2}). The racial makeup of the city was 87.01% White, 0.39% African American, 0.06% Native American, 0.17% Asian, 0.11% Pacific Islander, 10.82% from other races, and 1.44% from two or more races. Hispanics or Latinos of any race were 18.42% of the population.

Of the 740 households, 29.1% had children under 18 living with them, 48.8% were married couples living together, 11.6% had a female householder with no husband present, and 37.0% were not families. About 35.3% of all households were made up of individuals, and 23.4% had someone living alone who was 65 or older. The average household size was 2.23 and the average family size was 2.87.

The city's age distribution was 24.6% under 18, 4.9% from 18 to 24, 21.4% from 25 to 44, 20.5% from 45 to 64, and 28.5% who were 65 or older. The median age was 44 years. For every 100 females, there were 81.5 males. For every 100 females 18 and over, there were 76.1 males.

The median income for a household was $26,731, and for a family was $34,940. Males had a median income of $25,577 versus $19,602 for females. The per capita income for the city was $14,591. About 12.5% of families and 18.7% of the population were below the poverty line, including 21.8% of those under 18 and 22.2% of those 65 or over.

== Education ==
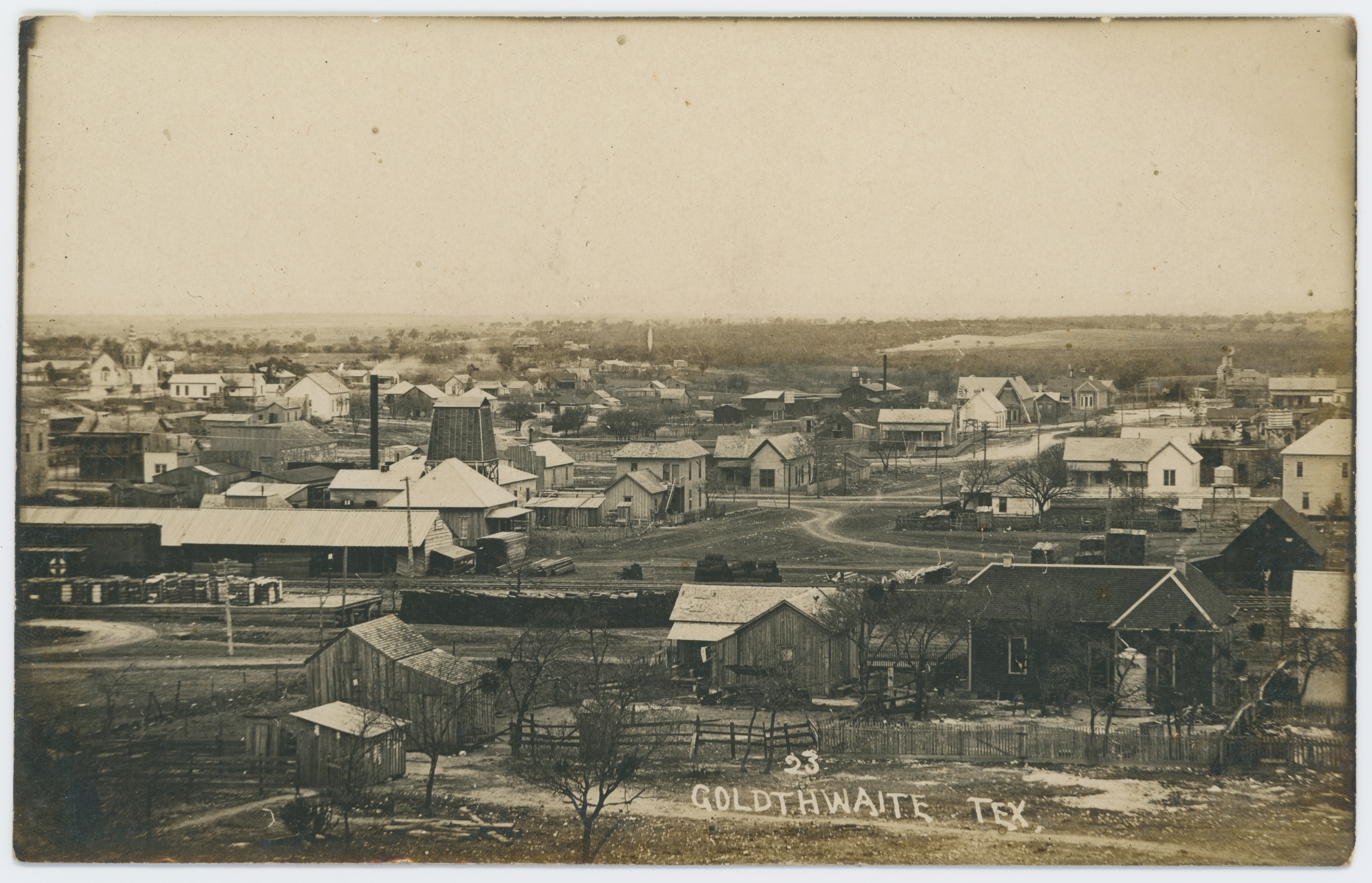
Goldthwaite, ca. 1907

Goldthwaite is served by the Goldthwaite Consolidated Independent School District. Schools located in Goldthwaite included Goldthwaite Elementary School, Goldthwaite Middle School, and Goldthwaite High School. New Horizons Ranch School is located off Farm-to-Market Road 574.

== Infrastructure ==
=== Transportation ===
==== Highways ====
- U.S. Route 84
- U.S. Route 183 (concurrent with U.S. Route 84 on the north side of the city)
- Texas State Highway 16 (concurrent with U.S. Routes 84 and 183 on the north side of the city)
- Texas Loop 15
- Farm to Market 574
- Farm to Market 2005

==== Rail ====
Goldthwaite is located on a BNSF Railway line connecting Temple to Sweetwater. As of 2024, the rail line is used for freight haulage only. The nearest Amtrak passenger train stop is the McGregor station in McGregor, served by the Texas Eagle.

==== Air ====
The City of Goldthwaite owns and operates the Goldthwaite Municipal Airport, a general-aviation airport with a 3,200 ft × 60 ft (975 m × 18 m) asphalt runway. The airport originally opened in 2011. In 2015, 10 T-hangars, a hangar apron, an access road, and a garage storage area for a courtesy car were constructed, and a fly-in golf program was offered in partnership with the adjacent golf course.

== Notable people ==
- Jody Conradt, women's basketball coach at the University of Texas at Austin
- Barton Yarborough, actor
