= Harvey, Texas =

- Unincorporated community
- Location within Texas Location within the United States
- Coordinates: 30°39′18″N 96°16′31″W
- Country: United States
- State: Texas
- County: Brazos
- Elevation: 325 ft (99 m)
- Time zone: UTC-6 (Central (CST))
  - Summer (DST): UTC-5 (CDT)
- Area code: 979
- GNIS feature ID: 1379904

Harvey is an unincorporated community in Brazos County, in the U.S. state of Texas. According to the Handbook of Texas, the community had a population of 310 in 2000. It is located within the Bryan-College Station metropolitan area.

== History ==
Harvey was established in 1879 and was named for Colonel Harvey Mitchell, a settler from Boonville

== Geography ==
Harvey is located on Farm to Market Road 30, 2 mi (3.2 km) southeast of Bryan in central Brazos County.

== Education ==
A school called Bethel Academy was established in the late 1800s and had 50 students enrolled. There were two schools in the 1930s. Today, the community is served by the Bryan Independent School District.
