= Edge, Texas =

- Unincorporated community
- Location within Texas Location within the United States
- Coordinates: 30°53′24″N 96°17′41″W
- Country: United States
- State: Texas
- County: Brazos
- Elevation: 341 ft (104 m)
- Time zone: UTC-6 (Central (CST))
  - Summer (DST): UTC-5 (CDT)
- Area code: 979
- GNIS feature ID: 1356815

Edge is an unincorporated community in Brazos County, Texas, United States. According to the Handbook of Texas, the community had a population of 100 in 2000. It is located within the Bryan-College Station metropolitan area.

== History ==
Edge was founded in the 1870s by Dr. John Edge, and named for him. A post office called Edge was established in 1894 and remained in operation until 1957. It was established near the Old San Antonio Road. John Edge and his two brothers established the first store in the community. There were two churches and eleven businesses in the community from 1896 to 1897. A general store was opened inside the post office by W.H. McMichael in 1900, with a drugstore and 25 residents. Six years later, J.M. Lawless started a cotton gin. Its population grew to 50 in 1910. A 1948 county highway map showed three churches and four businesses in and around the community. Its population was 100 from 1933 through 2000.

== Geography ==
Edge is located on Farm to Market Road 974 near Caney Creek, 14 mi (23 km) north of Bryan in northeastern Brazos County.

== Education ==
Edge had a high school from 1912 until it burned to the ground in 1940. It then joined the schools in Kurten in 1946. Today, the community is served by the Bryan Independent School District.

== Notable person ==
- Bill Closs, basketball player for Rice University
