= Fairview, Brazos County, Texas =

- Unincorporated community
- Location within Texas Location within the United States
- Coordinates: 30°39′8″N 96°26′7″W
- Country: United States
- State: Texas
- County: Brazos
- Elevation: 259 ft (79 m)
- Time zone: UTC-6 (Central (CST))
  - Summer (DST): UTC-5 (CDT)
- Area code: 979
- GNIS feature ID: 1357171

Fairview is an unincorporated community in Brazos County, in the U.S. state of Texas. According to the Handbook of Texas, no population estimates were available for the community in 2000. It is located within the Bryan-College Station metropolitan area.

== History ==
Prior to the official establishment of Fairview in the 1930s, it was a Black farming. A Baptist church was established in 1945. There were no population estimates available for the community in 2000.

== Geography ==
Fairview is located on Texas State Highway 21, 4 mi (6.4 km) southwest of downtown Bryan in western Brazos County.

== Education ==
A school was established here in the early 1930s. Local settler Evelyn Hall named it Fairview, and it was eventually converted into a community centre. Today, the community is served by the College Station Independent School District.
