= Sims, Texas =

- Ghost town
- Location within Texas Location within the United States
- Coordinates: 30°39′59″N 96°33′6″W
- Country: United States
- State: Texas
- County: Brazos
- Elevation: 253 ft (77 m)
- Time zone: UTC-6 (Central (CST))
  - Summer (DST): UTC-5 (CDT)
- Area code: 979
- GNIS feature ID: 1380545

Sims is a ghost town in Brazos County, in the U.S. state of Texas. It is located within the Bryan-College Station metropolitan area.

== History ==
Sims was a station on the Texas and New Orleans Railroad in the early 1900s. It had several scattered houses in 1949. The community only consisted of empty corn, oil and cotton fields in 1990.

== Geography ==
Sims was located on the Southern Pacific Railroad on Farm to Market Road 50, 10 mi (16 km) east of Bryan in western Brazos County.

== Education ==
Sims had its own school in the early 1900s and had two in 1949. Today, Sims is located within the Bryan Independent School District.
