= Enright, Texas =

- Ghost town
- Location within Texas Location within the United States
- Coordinates: 30°30′22″N 96°17′48″W
- Country: United States
- State: Texas
- County: Brazos
- Elevation: 292 ft (89 m)
- Time zone: UTC-6 (Central (CST))
  - Summer (DST): UTC-5 (CDT)
- Area code: 979
- GNIS feature ID: 1379728

Enright is a ghost town in Brazos County, in the U.S. state of Texas. It is located within the Bryan-College Station metropolitan area.

== History ==
Enright began as a railroad stop on the International-Great Northern Railroad in the early 1900s. County maps showed only several scattered houses and a quarry in the area in the 1930s. It never had a population recorded.

== Geography ==
Enright was located on Farm to Market Road 2154, 13 mi (21 km) southeast of Bryan in southern Brazos County.

== Education ==
Today, Enright is located within the College Station Independent School District.
