= Moore, Brazos County, Texas =

- Ghost town
- Location within Texas Location within the United States
- Coordinates: 30°46′14″N 96°19′52″W
- Country: United States
- State: Texas
- County: Brazos
- Elevation: 335 ft (102 m)
- Time zone: UTC-6 (Central (CST))
  - Summer (DST): UTC-5 (CDT)
- Area code: 979
- GNIS feature ID: 1380208

Moore is a ghost town in Brazos County, in the U.S. state of Texas. It is located within the Bryan-College Station metropolitan area.

== History ==
Moore may have first been settled in the early 1900s and may have been named for a local family. There were no population estimates available for Moore.

== Geography ==
Moore was located off Farm to Market Road 2776, 8 mi (13 km) northeast of Bryan in north-central Brazos County.

== Education ==
Today, Moore is located within the Bryan Independent School District.
