= Tabor, Texas =

- Unincorporated community
- Location within Texas Location within the United States
- Coordinates: 30°47′45″N 96°22′16″W
- Country: United States
- State: Texas
- County: Brazos
- Elevation: 341 ft (104 m)
- Time zone: UTC-6 (Central (CST))
  - Summer (DST): UTC-5 (CDT)
- Area code: 979
- GNIS feature ID: 1380637

Tabor is an unincorporated community in Brazos County, in the U.S. state of Texas. According to the Handbook of Texas, the community had a population of 150 in 2000. It is located within the Bryan-College Station metropolitan area.

== Geography ==
Tabor is located on Farm to Market Road 974, 9 mi (14 km) north of Bryan in northwestern Brazos County.

== Education ==
Today, the community is served by the Bryan Independent School District.
