= Reliance, Texas =

- Ghost town
- Location within Texas Location within the United States
- Coordinates: 30°44′36″N 96°14′21″W
- Country: United States
- State: Texas
- County: Brazos
- Elevation: 308 ft (94 m)
- Time zone: UTC-6 (Central (CST))
  - Summer (DST): UTC-5 (CDT)
- Area code: 979
- GNIS feature ID: 1380433

Reliance is a ghost town in Brazos County, in the U.S. state of Texas. It is located within the Bryan-College Station metropolitan area.

== Geography ==
Reliance was located three miles east of U.S. Highway 190 on Farm to Market Road 1179, 9 mi (14 km) north of Bryan in northeastern Brazos County.

== Education ==
In the 1905–1906 school year, Reliance had a school with 91 students and two teachers, who also taught in nearby Independence. It continued to operate as of 1948. Today, Reliance is located within the Bryan Independent School District.
