= Union, Brazos County, Texas =

- Ghost town
- Location within Texas Location within the United States
- Coordinates: 30°51′48″N 96°18′37″W
- Country: United States
- State: Texas
- County: Brazos
- Elevation: 305 ft (93 m)
- Time zone: UTC-6 (Central (CST))
  - Summer (DST): UTC-5 (CDT)
- Area code: 979
- GNIS feature ID: 1380693

Union is a ghost town in Brazos County, in the U.S. state of Texas. It is located within the Bryan-College Station metropolitan area.

== History ==
The area in what is now Union today may have first been settled in the early 1900s. It only had a church and several scattered dwellings in the 1930s, but never had a population recorded.

== Geography ==
Union was located on Farm to Market Road 974, 14 mi (23 km) northeast of Bryan in northern Brazos County.

== Education ==
Union had its own school in the 1930s. Today, Union is located within the Bryan Independent School District.
