= Stone City, Texas =

- Ghost town
- Location within Texas Location within the United States
- Coordinates: 30°37′49″N 96°32′31″W
- Country: United States
- State: Texas
- County: Brazos
- Elevation: 240 ft (73 m)
- Time zone: UTC-6 (Central (CST))
  - Summer (DST): UTC-5 (CDT)
- Area code: 979
- GNIS feature ID: 1380612

Stone City is a ghost town in Brazos County, in the U.S. state of Texas. It is located within the Bryan-College Station metropolitan area.

== History ==
Moseley's Ferry operated here in the 1860s. The Stone City community was founded as a terminus on the Hearne and Brazos Valley Railway in 1892. A post office was established at Stone City that year and remained in operation until 1919. In 1914, businesses in Stone City included telephone service, a grocery store, a general store, and a dry goods store serving 32 residents. Residents then received their mail from Mudville. Its population was 50 in 1940 with two businesses, which then went down to only several scattered houses and Mount Zion Church in 1988.

== Geography ==
Stone City was located on the Southern Pacific Railroad on Farm to Market Road 21 and the Brazos River, 11 mi (18 km) southwest of Bryan in far western Brazos County.

== Education ==
Today, Stone City is located within the Bryan Independent School District.
