= College Station High School =

Location
- 4002 Victoria Avenue; College Station, Texas 77418-1599; United States; 30.558007°N 96.287187°W

Information
- School type: Public high school
- Established: 2012
- School district: College Station Independent School District
- Principal: Justin Grimes
- Staff: 141.06 (FTE)
- Grades: 9-12
- Enrollment: 2,197 (2023–2024)
- Student to teacher ratio: 15.57
- Campus: Suburban
- Colors: Purple and Black
- Athletics conference: UIL Class 5A
- Mascot: Cougars
- Nickname: The Purple Palace
- Rivals: A&M Consolidated High School, Bryan High School, James Earl Rudder High School
- Newspaper: The Catamount
- Yearbook: Cougar Pride
- Website: College Station High School

College Station High School is a public high school located in College Station, Texas (US). The school is classified as a 5A school by the UIL. It is part of the College Station Independent School District located in southern Brazos County. For the 2024-2025 school year, the school was given a "B" by the Texas Education Agency.

== History ==
In May 2009, College Station voters approved the sale of $144.2 million in bonds, including approximately $112 million for the construction of a second comprehensive high school. College Station High School opened in August 2012 with freshmen and sophomores only. A grade was added each year until full implementation in August 2014. The first graduating class for College Station High School was the Class of 2015.

== Athletics ==
The College Station Cougars compete in these sports:

- Baseball
- Basketball
- Cross-country running
- Football
- Golf
- Powerlifting
- Soccer
- Softball
- Tennis
- Track and field
- Volleyball
- Wrestling

=== State titles ===
- Football
  - 2017 (5A/D2)
- Girls' cross-country
  - 2013 (3A)
- Baseball
  - 2014 (3A)
- Boys' tennis
  - 2014 (3A singles)

==== State finalists ====
- Boys Soccer
  - 2026 (5A/D1)
- Football
  - 2021 (5A/D1)
  - 2022 (5A/D1)

== Fine arts ==
College Station High School's fine arts programs include:

- Art
- Band
- Choir
- Dance
- Orchestra
- Theatre

== Cougar Band and Guard ==
The College Station High School Cougar Band and Guard program consists of over 210 students in grades 9–12.

The program is under the direction of Jon Seale, Michael Dixon, and Joseph Cohn.

College Station High School supports a color guard program, under the direction of Laura Nolen.

== Notable alumni ==
- Joshua Donovan, professional football player
- Brandon Joseph, professional football player
