= Peach Creek, Brazos County, Texas =

- Unincorporated community
- Location within Texas Location within the United States
- Coordinates: 30°32′19″N 96°11′41″W
- Country: United States
- State: Texas
- County: Brazos
- Elevation: 233 ft (71 m)
- Time zone: UTC-6 (Central (CST))
  - Summer (DST): UTC-5 (CDT)
- Area code: 979
- GNIS feature ID: 1380333

Peach Creek is an unincorporated community in Brazos County, in the U.S. state of Texas. According to the Handbook of Texas, no population estimates were available for the community in 2000. It is located within the Bryan-College Station metropolitan area.

== History ==
Peach Creek was first settled in the late 1800s and was named for a nearby creek of the same name. The oldest graves in its cemetery date back to the 1870s. Some of the first settlers were surnamed Allen, Greer, Symms, Marquart, Barker, and Day. Riverside Dancehall served as the community center. There was no population estimate in 2000.

== Geography ==
Peach Creek is located on Farm to Market Road 159, 15 mi (24 km) southeast of Bryan in southeastern Brazos County.

== Education ==
Peach Creek had a school in the 1900s, which closed at the end of the decade. Today, Peach Creek is served by the College Station Independent School District.
