= Macey, Texas =

- Ghost town
- Location within Texas Location within the United States
- Coordinates: 30°56′57″N 96°15′50″W
- Country: United States
- State: Texas
- County: Brazos
- Elevation: 318 ft (97 m)
- Time zone: UTC-6 (Central (CST))
  - Summer (DST): UTC-5 (CDT)
- Area code: 979
- GNIS feature ID: 1380122

Macey is a ghost town in Brazos County, in the U.S. state of Texas. It is located within the Bryan-College Station metropolitan area.

== Geography ==
Macey was located south of the intersection of Farm to Market Road 1940 and the Old Spanish Road, 20 mi (32 km) north of Bryan in far northeastern Brazos County.

== Education ==
Macey had its own school in 1884. Today, Macey is located within the Bryan Independent School District.
