= Dinkins, Texas =

- Ghost town
- Location within Texas Location within the United States
- Coordinates: 30°25′18″N 96°10′37″W
- Country: United States
- State: Texas
- County: Brazos
- Elevation: 194 ft (59 m)
- Time zone: UTC-6 (Central (CST))
  - Summer (DST): UTC-5 (CDT)
- Area code: 979
- GNIS feature ID: 1379666

Dinkins is a ghost town in Brazos County, in the U.S. state of Texas. It is located within the Bryan-College Station metropolitan area.

== Geography ==
Dinkins was located on White Switch Road, which runs north to south between Farm to Market Roads 159 and 2154, 4 mi (6.4 km) west of Navasota in southern Brazos County.

== Education ==
In the late 1940s, Dinkins had a school that joined the schools in Millican and Allenfarm. Today, Dinkins is located within the Navasota Independent School District.
