= Cawthon, Texas =

- Unincorporated community
- Location within Texas Location within the United States
- Coordinates: 30°25′7″N 96°14′35″W
- Country: United States
- State: Texas
- County: Brazos
- Elevation: 233 ft (71 m)
- Time zone: UTC-6 (Central (CST))
  - Summer (DST): UTC-5 (CDT)
- Area code: 979
- GNIS feature ID: 1354026

Cawthon is an unincorporated community in Brazos County, in the U.S. state of Texas. According to the Handbook of Texas, the community had a population of 75 in 2000. It is located within the Bryan-College Station metropolitan area.

== Geography ==
Cawthon is located on Farm to Market Road 159, 4 mi (6.4 km) south of Millican and 17 mi (27 km) south of Bryan in southern Brazos County.

== Education ==
Cawthon had its own school in 1948. Today, the community is served by the Navasota Independent School District.
