= Wellborn, Texas =

- Unincorporated community
- Location within Texas Location within the United States
- Coordinates: 30°32′07″N 96°18′06″W
- Country: United States
- State: Texas
- County: Brazos
- Elevation: 325 ft (99 m)
- Time zone: UTC-6 (Central (CST))
  - Summer (DST): UTC-5 (CDT)
- Area code: 979
- GNIS feature ID: 1371029

Wellborn (locally pronounced WELL-burn) is an unincorporated community in Brazos County, Texas, United States. According to the Handbook of Texas, the community had an estimated population of 100 in 2000. It is part of the Bryan–College Station metropolitan statistical area.

== Geography ==
Wellborn is located along FM 2154 (Wellborn Road) on the Southern Pacific Railroad, about 4 miles south of College Station and 8 miles northwest of Millican in southern Brazos County.

== History ==
The community came into existence in 1867 as a construction camp on the Houston and Texas Central Railroad and was a part of the northeastern corner of a land grant given to A.M. McMahon. The first store, cotton gin, and lumberyard were established by John and Thomas Royder of the Rock Prairie community. The town's name has been attributed to a well at the construction camp, a foreman named E.W. Wellborn, or a landowner named W.W. Wilburn.

In 1867, a post office opened in the community under the name Wellborn Station. Three years later, the name was shortened to Wellborn. By the mid-1880s, Wellborn had developed into a shipping point for cattle and had a population around 50. In 1885, Wellborn had two churches, a gristmill, a cotton gin, and 50 residents. It was home to 400 people by 1910. Soon after, Wellborn went into decline. The number of inhabitants hit a low of 40 in 1950, partly due to the rise of nearby College Station and Bryan. An estimated 100 people lived in Wellborn as of the late 1980s. Twenty businesses, a community center, and water utilities were operational in 1990. The population hovered around 100 throughout the 1990s and into 2000. In 2001, a new water tower was built in Wellborn.

Although Wellborn is unincorporated, it has a post office, with the ZIP code of 77881. The Wellborn Cemetery, which dates back to the early 1870s, is designated a state historic landmark. In 2009, the Citizens for Wellborn Committee was founded as a nonprofit group to explore incorporation.

Citizens of Wellborn have fought with the city of College Station to protect itself from being incorporated into the city; the College Station City Council voted 5-2 to annex Wellborn and incorporate it into the city on April 14, 2011.

On April 30, 2007, the second episode of Diners, Drive-Ins and Dives was filmed at the Hullabaloo Diner in Wellborn.

== Education ==
Public education in the community of Wellborn is provided by the College Station Independent School District. Zoned campuses include Greens Prairie Elementary (prekindergarten-grade 4), Pecan Trail Intermediate (grades 5-6), Wellborn Middle (grades 7-8), and A&M Consolidated High (grades 9-12).

Wellborn had its own school in 1885. In the 1904-1905 school year, it had one teacher and 44 students.

Reveille VII, a mascot for Texas A&M University, retired at the age of seven in 2008 and lived with Paul and Tina Gardner in Wellborn.
