= Cottonwood, Brazos County, Texas =

- Ghost town
- Location within Texas Location within the United States
- Coordinates: 30°49′44″N 96°20′3″W
- Country: United States
- State: Texas
- County: Brazos
- Elevation: 338 ft (103 m)
- Time zone: UTC-6 (Central (CST))
  - Summer (DST): UTC-5 (CDT)
- Area code: 979
- GNIS feature ID: 1379600

Cottonwood is a ghost town in Brazos County, in the U.S. state of Texas. It is located within the Bryan-College Station metropolitan area.

== Geography ==
Cottonwood was located at the intersection of Farm to Market Roads 974 and 2038, 12 mi (19 km) northeast of Bryan in northern Brazos County.

== Education ==
The Cottonwood Baptist Church that was built in 1910 was used as a school and continued to operate into the 1930s. Today, Cottonwood is located within the Bryan Independent School District.
