= Wicker, Texas =

- Ghost town
- Location within Texas Location within the United States
- Coordinates: 30°32′19″N 96°18′39″W
- Country: United States
- State: Texas
- County: Brazos
- Elevation: 328 ft (100 m)
- Time zone: UTC-6 (Central (CST))
  - Summer (DST): UTC-5 (CDT)
- Area code: 979
- GNIS feature ID: 1380778

Wicker is a ghost town in Brazos County, in the U.S. state of Texas. It is located within the Bryan-College Station metropolitan area.

== History ==
The area in what is now known as Wicker today may have been settled in the early 1900s as a railroad station on the International-Great Northern Railroad. It also had a church in the 1930s, but no population estimates were recorded.

== Geography ==
Wicker was located west of Farm to Market Road 2154, 10 mi (16 km) southeast of Bryan in southern Brazos County.

== Education ==
Today, Wicker is located within the College Station Independent School District.
