= Smetana (disambiguation) =

Bedřich Smetana (1824–1884) was a Czech composer.

Smetana may also refer to:

- Smetana (crater), a crater on Mercury
- Smetana (dairy product), an Eastern European version of sour cream
- Smetana, Texas, US
- Smetana, a village and part of Plchovice in the Czech Republic
- 2047 Smetana, a bright Hungaria asteroid

== People ==
- Emma Smetana (born 1988), Czech actress, singer, television presenter, journalist and political scientist
- Felix Smetana (1907–1968), German art director
- František Smetana (born 1997), a Czech sports shooter
- Ondřej Smetana (footballer) (born 1982), Czech footballer
- Ondřej Smetana (speedway rider) (born 1995), Czech motorcycle speedway rider
- Zdenek Smetana (1925–2016), Czech animator and director
