= Mooring, Texas =

- Unincorporated community
- Location within Texas Location within the United States
- Coordinates: 30°41′23″N 96°33′20″W
- Country: United States
- State: Texas
- County: Brazos
- Elevation: 256 ft (78 m)
- Time zone: UTC-6 (Central (CST))
  - Summer (DST): UTC-5 (CDT)
- Area code: 979
- GNIS feature ID: 1380210

Mooring is an unincorporated community in Brazos County, in the U.S. state of Texas. According to the Handbook of Texas, the community had a population of 80 in 2000. It is located within the Bryan-College Station metropolitan area.

== History ==
Mooring first appeared on the Texas Almanac in 1954 or 1955, but had no population estimates available. It had a church, a business, and several scattered homes in 1948. Its population was recorded at 150 in 1964, 100 in 1970, and 80 from 1973 through 2000. Its only business was a cotton gin as of 1990.

== Geography ==
Mooring is located at the intersection of Farm to Market Road 50 and Texas State Highway 21 on the Southern Pacific Railroad in far northwestern Brazos County.

== Education ==
Mooring had its own school in 1948. Today, the community is served by the Bryan Independent School District.
