= Smetana, Texas =

- Unincorporated community
- Location within Texas Location within the United States
- Coordinates: 30°39′8″N 96°27′26″W
- Country: United States
- State: Texas
- County: Brazos
- Elevation: 266 ft (81 m)
- Time zone: UTC-6 (Central (CST))
  - Summer (DST): UTC-5 (CDT)
- Area code: 979
- GNIS feature ID: 1388219

Smetana is an unincorporated community in Brazos County, in the U.S. state of Texas. According to the Handbook of Texas, the community had a population of 80 in 2000. It is located within the Bryan-College Station metropolitan area.

== Geography ==
Smetana is located on Texas State Highway 21 and U.S. Route 190, 6 mi (9.7 km) west of Bryan in Brazos County.

== Education ==
Smetana had its own school in 1885 and gained another one in 1941. The Texas A&M Research and Extension Center, also known as the Old Bryan Army Airfield, is located one mile west of Smetana. Today, the community is served by the Bryan Independent School District.
