= Dallam, Texas =

- Ghost town
- Location within Texas Location within the United States
- Coordinates: 30°25′13″N 96°12′59″W
- Country: United States
- State: Texas
- County: Brazos
- Elevation: 210 ft (64 m)
- Time zone: UTC-6 (Central (CST))
  - Summer (DST): UTC-5 (CDT)
- Area code: 979
- GNIS feature ID: 1379632

Dallam is a ghost town in Brazos County, in the U.S. state of Texas. It is located within the Bryan-College Station metropolitan area.

== History ==
The area in what is known as Dallam today (not the county) was first settled in the 1900s. It was a station on the International and Great Northern Railroad. There were three prisons in the area, in which prisoners were subjected to hard labor. It continued to be listed on maps in the 1950s, but disappeared shortly after with no population recorded.

== Geography ==
Dallam was located 16 mi (26 km) southeast of College Station in southern Brazos County.

== Education ==
Today, Dallam is located within the Navasota Independent School District.
