= Bryan Collegiate High School =

Location
- 1901 Villa Maria Road; Bryan, Texas 77802; United States; 30°39′08″N 96°20′49″W

Information
- Type: Public high school
- Motto: "Progressio Doctrina Utilitas"
- Established: Fall 2007
- School district: Bryan Independent School District
- Superintendent: Christie Whitbeck
- Principal: Desiree Caperton
- Faculty: 21.59 (on an FTE basis)
- Grades: 9-12
- Enrollment: 459 (2023-2024)
- Colors: Silver, Navy Blue, and Maroon
- Team name: Panthers
- Website: Official Website

Bryan Collegiate High School is a public high school in Bryan, Texas (United States). It is one of four high schools in the Bryan Independent School District. For the 2024-2025 school year, the school was given an "A" by the Texas Education Agency.

Bryan Collegiate High School is an Early College High School: its students take dual credit classes all four years of high school through a partnership with Blinn College.

Bryan Collegiate High School does not have varsity team sports, but it does offer club-level sports (not affiliated with the University Interscholastic League) and physical education.
