= Shawn Slocum =

American football coach (born 1965)

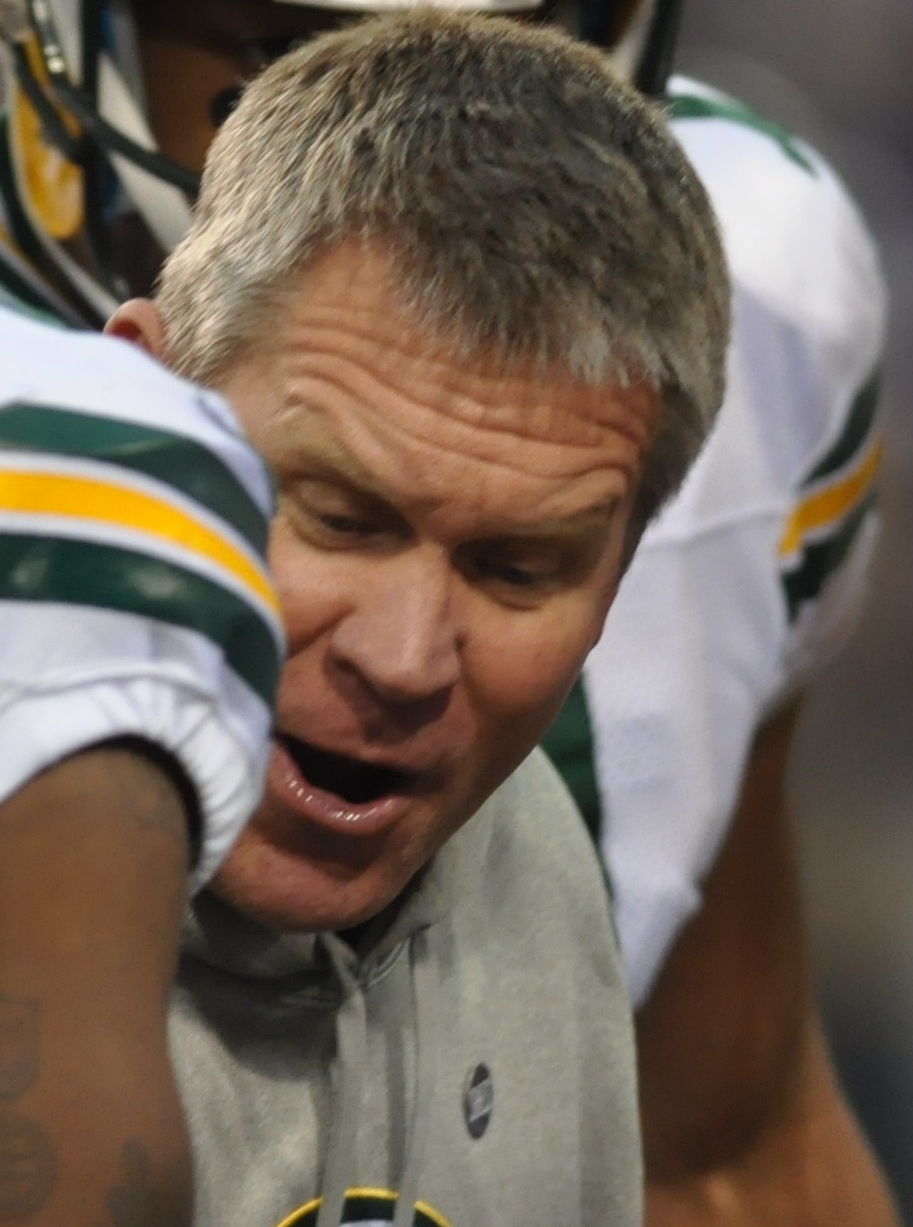
- Slocum in 2012

Profile
- Position: Associate head coach/special teams coordinator/outside linebackers coach

Personal information
- Born: February 21, 1965 (age 61); Monticello, Arkansas, U.S.

Career information
- High school: Bryan (TX)
- College: Texas A&M

Career history
- Texas A&M (1989) Assistant coach; Pittsburgh (1990) Graduate assistant; Texas A&M (1991–1993) Special teams coordinator & tight end coach; Texas A&M (1994–1997) Special teams coordinator & linebackers coach; USC (1998–1999) Special teams coordinator & linebackers coach; Texas A&M (2000–2002) Special teams coordinator & defensive backs coach; Ole Miss (2005) Linebackers coach; Green Bay Packers (2006–2008) Assistant special teams coordinator; Green Bay Packers (2009–2014) Special teams coordinator; Arizona State (2015–2022) Associate head coach & special teams coordinator & outside linebackers coach

Awards and highlights
- Super Bowl champion (XLV)

Richard Shawn Slocum (born February 21, 1965) is an American football coach who was the special teams coach for the Green Bay Packers of the National Football League (NFL) and most recently was the associate head coach, special teams coordinator and outside linebackers coach at Arizona State University.

== Early life and college career ==
Born in Monticello, Arkansas, Slocum graduated from Bryan High School in Bryan, Texas in 1983 and attended Texas A&M University, where he played football as a linebacker and was a member of the 12th Man Kickoff Team under coach Jackie Sherrill. Slocum earned one letter with the team in 1984. He graduated with a B.S. in construction management in 1987 from the Texas A&M College of Architecture.

== Coaching career ==
Slocum started his coaching career as a volunteer assistant at Texas A&M, under his father R. C. Slocum. In 1990, Shawn served as a graduate assistant at the University of Pittsburgh, coaching the defense. He returned to coaching at Texas A&M, coaching tight ends, linebackers, and special teams from 1991 to 1997. From 1991 to 1993, Slocum helped the Aggies win three straight Southwest Conference championships. During the years 1994–97, he coached two all-Americans, Shane Lechler and Lombardi Award winner Dat Nguyen, who both went on to play for the NFL. During his seven-season coaching tenure at A&M, he assisted the Aggies to five bowl games, including four Cotton Bowl Classic appearances. The Aggie team record was 94-28-2 from 1991 to 1997. The 94 wins were the sixth in the country and also the greatest wins by any Texas Division I school in any decade. From 1998 to 1999, Slocum coached at the University of Southern California, where he coached Butkus Award winner Chris Claiborne, Zeke Moreno, and Markus Steele. He returned to A&M again and coached the Secondary and special teams from 2000 to 2002. In 2005, he became assistant head coach and linebacker coach at Ole Miss, where he coached star linebacker Patrick Willis.

On February 6, 2006, Slocum joined the Packers, becoming the assistant special teams coach. He got promoted to special teams coordinator on January 14, 2009.

The Dallas Morning News ranked the Packers special teams units 29th in 2010 and 31st in 2011.

The Packers' special teams units were ranked 12th in 2012 and 20th in 2013 by the Dallas Morning News.

On January 30, 2015, the Packers fired Slocum after his special teams unit botched two critical plays during the NFC Championship Game. The first play came on a fake field goal attempt by Seattle. On the play, confusion amongst Green Bay's special teams coverage unit allowed for former Packers punter Jon Ryan to role out and throw a touchdown pass to eligible offensive lineman Garry Gilliam, who had snuck open behind the defense when many of the Packers defenders chose to rush Ryan instead of cover Gilliam. The second, and more critical, play was the Packers botched onside kick recovery late in the game when Brandon Bostick ignored his blocking assignment and went for the ball, which ricocheted off his helmet and allowed Seattle to easily recover. Shortly after this play, Slocum could be seen angrily yelling at Bostick for his misplay. The Packers lost the game in overtime, 28–22, after being up 16–0 in the third quarter and 19–7 with under 5 minutes to play. Head coach Mike McCarthy also said that the teams inconsistent special teams play throughout the season also played a role in his dismissal.

On March 2, 2015, Slocum joined Todd Graham's coaching staff at Arizona State University as associate head coach, special teams coordinator, and outside linebackers coach.

On January 9, 2018, Slocum was retained as Sun Devils special teams coordinator and associate head coach.

== Personal life ==
His father R. C. Slocum was head coach for Texas A&M from 1989 to 2002 and is the winningest coach in Texas A&M football history. R. C. Slocum was a tight end at McNeese State when Shawn was born. Shawn Slocum has been an assistant coach at Texas A&M under R. C. Slocum.

Shawn Slocum is currently married to the former Michelle Biehl and has four children (daughters, Tayler, Jordyn, Haley and son Jaxon).

Preceded by Mike Stock	Green Bay Packers Special Teams Coordinators; January 14, 2009–January 30, 2015	Succeeded by Ron Zook
