= James Earl Rudder High School =

Location
- 3251 Austins Colony Parkway; Bryan, Brazos, Texas 77808; United States; 30.688382°N 96.342702°W

Information
- Type: Public high school
- Established: 2007
- School district: Bryan Independent School District
- Principal: Rachel Layton
- Faculty: 128.39 (FTE)
- Grades: 9-12
- Enrollment: 1,769 (2022–23)
- Student to teacher ratio: 13.78
- Colors: Green and black
- Athletics conference: UIL Class 5A
- Team name: Rangers
- Website: Official website

James Earl Rudder High School is a public high school located in Bryan, Texas, United States. It is part of the Bryan Independent School District. The school enrollment is more than 1,700 students. The school was classified as a 5A school by the UIL. For the 2024-2025 school year, the school was given a "C" by the Texas Education Agency.

In addition to portions of Bryan, the school's attendance boundary includes Kurten, Lake Bryan, and Wixon Valley.

== About ==
James Earl Rudder High School is named after James Earl Rudder, a highly decorated World War II soldier. His honors include the Distinguished Service Cross, Legion of Merit, Silver Star, and French Legion of Honor.

While lieutenant colonel of the 2nd Ranger Battalion, he led the group up 100 ft. cliffs on a beach in Normandy on D-Day. After the war, Rudder served as mayor of Brady, Texas from 1946 to 1952. In 1955 he was appointed State Land Commissioner, where he worked to "increase the permanent endowments for public schools and universities." He became the president of Texas A&M College (now known as Texas A&M University) in 1959, located in neighboring College Station. While president, he was instrumental in allowing women to attend the university.

== History ==
Bryan Independent School District decided to build the new high school mainly because of overcrowding at Bryan High School. The funding came from a $104 million bond agreement. Before the campus was built, 300 James Earl Rudder High School students attended Bryan High School's campus for the first year of the campus' completion, and their core classes were taught by new Rudder teachers. Hon. Chet Edwards of the House of Representatives attended the school's dedication.

== Fine Arts ==
Rudder High School has a large variety of fine arts and career paths to join. Students can go to competitions for these courses in SkillsUSA, and Technology Skill Association (TSA) to demonstrate their skills and get recognition.

- Graphic Design
- Photography
- Game Design
- Welding
- Construction
- Cosmetology
- Art
- Choir
- Band
- Dance
- Orchestra
- Theatre

== Athletics ==
The James Earl Rudder High School mascot is the Ranger. The Rangers compete in the following sports:

- Baseball
- Basketball
- Cross country
- Football
- Golf
- Gymnastics
- Powerlifting
- Soccer
- Softball
- Tennis
- Track and field
- Volleyball
- Wrestling

=== Football ===
The school has a District 18-5A football program and shares a football stadium with Bryan High School. Recent renovations to the football stadium include a $1.1 million Matrix turf with an 11,000 seat capacity.

=== Gymnastics ===
The Rudder boys' gymnastics team won a state championship title two times in three years (2013-2016).

== Notable alumni ==
- Hunter Dobbins (born 1999), professional baseball player
- Isaiah Johnson (born 1995), professional football player
- Mike Jones (born 1992), professional football player
