= Allenfarm, Texas =

- Unincorporated community
- Location within Texas Location within the United States
- Coordinates: 30°23′58″N 96°14′38″W
- Country: United States
- State: Texas
- County: Brazos
- Elevation: 200 ft (61 m)
- Time zone: UTC-6 (Central (CST))
  - Summer (DST): UTC-5 (CDT)
- Area code: 979
- GNIS feature ID: 1351007

Allenfarm is an unincorporated community in Brazos County, in the U.S. state of Texas. According to the Handbook of Texas, the community had a population of 30 in 2000. It is located within the Bryan-College Station metropolitan area.

== Geography ==
Allenfarm is located on Farm to Market Road 159 on the Atchison, Topeka and Santa Fe Railway, 24 mi (39 km) south of Bryan in southern Brazos County.

== Education ==
Allenfarm had two schools in the 1940s. Today, the community is served by the Navasota Independent School District.
