= A&M Consolidated High School =

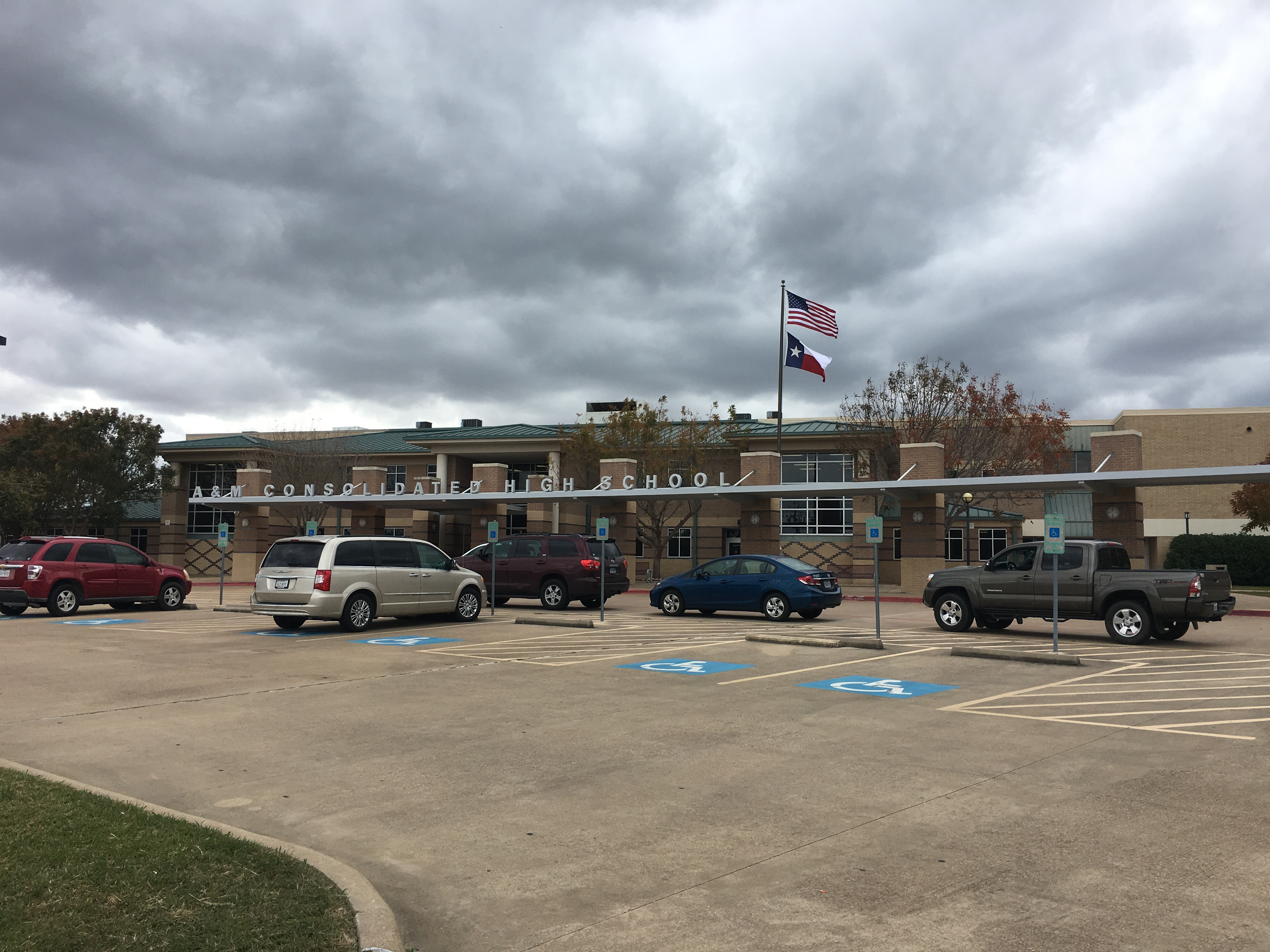
- The main entrance of the school

Location
- 1801 Harvey Mitchell Parkway South; College Station, Texas 77840-5198; United States
- 30.5901°N 96.316425°W

Information
- School type: Public high school
- Established: 1920
- School district: College Station Independent School District
- Principal: Gwen Elder
- Teaching staff: 133.14 (FTE)
- Grades: 9-12
- Enrollment: 2,160 (2023–2024)
- Student to teacher ratio: 16.22
- Campus: Suburban
- Colors: Maroon & White
- Athletics conference: UIL Class 5A
- Mascot: Tigers
- Rivals: College Station High; Bryan High
- Newspaper: The Roar
- Yearbook: Tigerland
- Website: amchs.csisd.org

A&M Consolidated High School, also known as "Consol", is a public high school located in the city of College Station, Texas, United States. It is classified as a 5A-D1 school by the UIL. The school is part of the College Station Independent School District located in southern Brazos County. For the 2024–2025 school year, the school was given a "B" by the Texas Education Agency. Until the opening of College Station High School in 2012, A&M Consolidated was the only high school in College Station; the two schools are now crosstown rivals.

== Athletics ==
The A&M Consolidated Tigers compete in these sports:

- Baseball
- Basketball
- Cross Country
- Football
- Golf
- Gymnastics
- Powerlifting
- Soccer
- Softball
- Swimming and Diving
- Track and Field
- Tennis
- Volleyball
- Wrestling

=== State titles ===
- Boys' Cross Country -
  - 1974(B), 1975(B), 1976(B), 1977(B), 1988(B), 1982(4A), 1984(4A), 1992(4A)
- Girls' Cross Country -
  - 1980(4A), 1983(4A), 1984(4A)
- Football -
  - 1991(4A)
- Boys' Golf -
  - 1969(3A)
- Boys’ Tennis -
  - 2019, 2021 (5A doubles)
- Girls’ Soccer -
  - 2025 (5A D1)
- Boys' Swimming and Diving
  - 2026 (5A)

== Academics ==
- Academic UIL State Meet Overall Champions
  - 1997(5A), 2005(5A), 2006(5A)
- Computer Science
  - 2025(5A)
- Current Issues and Events
  - 2000(5A), 2002(5A), 2003(5A), 2005(5A), 2013-2017(5A), 2019(5A)
- Number Sense
  - 1961(2A), 1962(2A), 1963(2A)
- Mathematics
  - 1994(4A), 1995(5A), 1996(5A), 1997(5A), 2006(5A)
- Social Studies
  - 2004(5A), 2006(5A)
- One Act Play
  - 1957(1A), 1962(2A), 1963(2A)
- National Science Bowl Top 4
  - 2000, 2003, 2004
- BEST Robotics State Championship Qualifier
  - 1997-2015, 2017–2019

== Rivalries ==
A&M Consolidated has two main rivals: College Station High School and Bryan High School. The rivalry with College Station High is due to the two schools being the only two public high schools that sponsor UIL athletics teams in the city of College Station (College View High does not offer UIL athletics). Bryan High has long been a rival of A&M Consolidated, as the two were, for many years, the only two high schools in the Twin Cities: Bryan and College Station. The rivalry between them is called the "Crosstown Showdown".

== Notable alumni ==
- Matthew Berry, ESPN sports analyst
- Brianna Hildebrand, actress
- Thomas Sadoski, actor
- Alex Caruso, NBA player
- Marcus Moore, Emmy Award-winning journalist, ABC News anchor
- Red Cashion, NFL head referee
- Bill Blakeley, basketball coach
- Chris Cralle, Olympic athlete
- Casey Grice, LPGA golfer
- Juliana Huxtable, artist, writer, and DJ
- Matt Langwell, former MLB baseball pitcher
- David Nixon (American football), former NFL linebacker
- Eagle Pennell, filmmaker
- Neil Sperry, horticulturalist
- Troy Walters, former NFL wide receiver
- Kip Corrington, former NFL defensive back
- Clif Groce, former NFL running back
- Emily Pulley, opera singer
- Tiffany Thornton, actress
- Larry Fedora, former head football coach, University of North Carolina
- Sasha Cooke, Grammy Award-winning opera singer
- Jessie Liu, former U.S. Attorney for the District of Columbia and Deputy General Counsel for the U.S. Department of the Treasury
- Patrick Briaud, former professional tennis player
- Alok Vaid-Menon, writer, poet, comedian, and activist
- Aiden Ross (singer), singer
