= Lake Bryan, Texas =

- Census-designated place
- Location within Texas
- Coordinates: 30°43′25″N 96°28′59″W
- Country: United States
- State: Texas
- County: Brazos

Area
  - Total: 10.2 sq mi (26.4 km^{2})
  - Land: 9.2 sq mi (23.7 km^{2})
  - Water: 1.0 sq mi (2.7 km^{2})
- Elevation: 371 ft (113 m)

Population (2020)
  - Total: 2,060
  - Density: 189/sq mi (72.9/km^{2})
- Time zone: UTC-6 (Central (CST))
  - Summer (DST): UTC-5 (CDT)
- Area code: 979
- FIPS code: 48-40462
- GNIS feature ID: 2586943

Lake Bryan is a census-designated place (CDP) in Brazos County, Texas, United States, situated around a reservoir of the same name managed by Bryan Texas Utilities. The population was 2,060 at the 2020 census. It is part of the Bryan–College Station metropolitan area.

== Geography ==
Lake Bryan is located along the northwestern border of Brazos County. It is bordered to the southeast by the city of Bryan and to the northwest by Robertson County. U.S. Route 190 forms the northeastern edge of the CDP, leading southeast around Bryan and northwest 13 miles (21 km) to Hearne.

According to the United States Census Bureau, the CDP has a total area of 10.2 square miles (26.4 km^{2}), of which 9.2 square miles (23.7 km^{2}) is land and 1.0 square mile (2.7 km^{2}), or 10.15%, is water.

== Demographics ==
Historical population
Census	Pop.	Note	%±
2010	1,728		—
2020	2,060		19.2%
U.S. Decennial Census; 1850–1900 1910; 1920 1930 1940; 1950 1960 1970; 1980 1990 2000; 2010 2020

Lake Bryan first appeared as a census designated place in the 2010 U.S. census.

=== 2020 census ===
Lake Bryan CDP, Texas – Racial and ethnic composition Note: the US Census treats Hispanic/Latino as an ethnic category. This table excludes Latinos from the racial categories and assigns them to a separate category. Hispanics/Latinos may be of any race.
Race / Ethnicity (NH = Non-Hispanic)	Pop 2010	Pop 2020	% 2010	% 2020
White alone (NH)	788	652	45.60%	31.65%
Black or African American alone (NH)	104	75	6.02%	3.64%
Native American or Alaska Native alone (NH)	2	6	0.12%	0.29%
Asian alone (NH)	2	0	0.12%	0.00%
Pacific Islander alone (NH)	4	0	0.23%	0.00%
Other race alone (NH)	2	22	0.12%	1.07%
Mixed race or Multiracial (NH)	6	56	0.35%	2.72%
Hispanic or Latino (any race)	820	1,249	47.45%	60.63%
Total	1,728	2,060	100.00%	100.00%

As of the 2020 United States census, there were 2,060 people, 426 households, and 301 families residing in the CDP.

== Education ==
The community is served by Bryan Independent School District (BISD).

Almost all of the CDP is zoned to Kemp Elementary School and Jane Long Middle School, with two parcels in the zones of Navarro Elementary School and Rayburn Intermediate School. Bilingual students zoned to Kemp attend Kemp-Carver Elementary School while bilingual students zoned to Navarro attend Navarro. All of Lake Bryan is zoned to Davila Middle School and Rudder High School.

== See also ==
- Lake Bryan, the reservoir
