= Zack, Texas =

Ghost town in Brazos County, Texas, US

Zack was a formerly populated place in Brazos County, Texas, United States.

Zack was located approximately twelve miles northeast of Bryan, and its founding can be traced to 1904, when Zachariah R. Guess opened a post office in the general store he operated. Cyrus Koontz bought the store from Guess in 1906 and operated it until 1932. The community was never large, with an estimated population of 25 between the years of 1925 through 1950. By 1988, it no longer appeared on highway maps.
