= Boonville, Texas =

Ghost town in Brazos County, Texas, United States

Boonville
- Ghost town
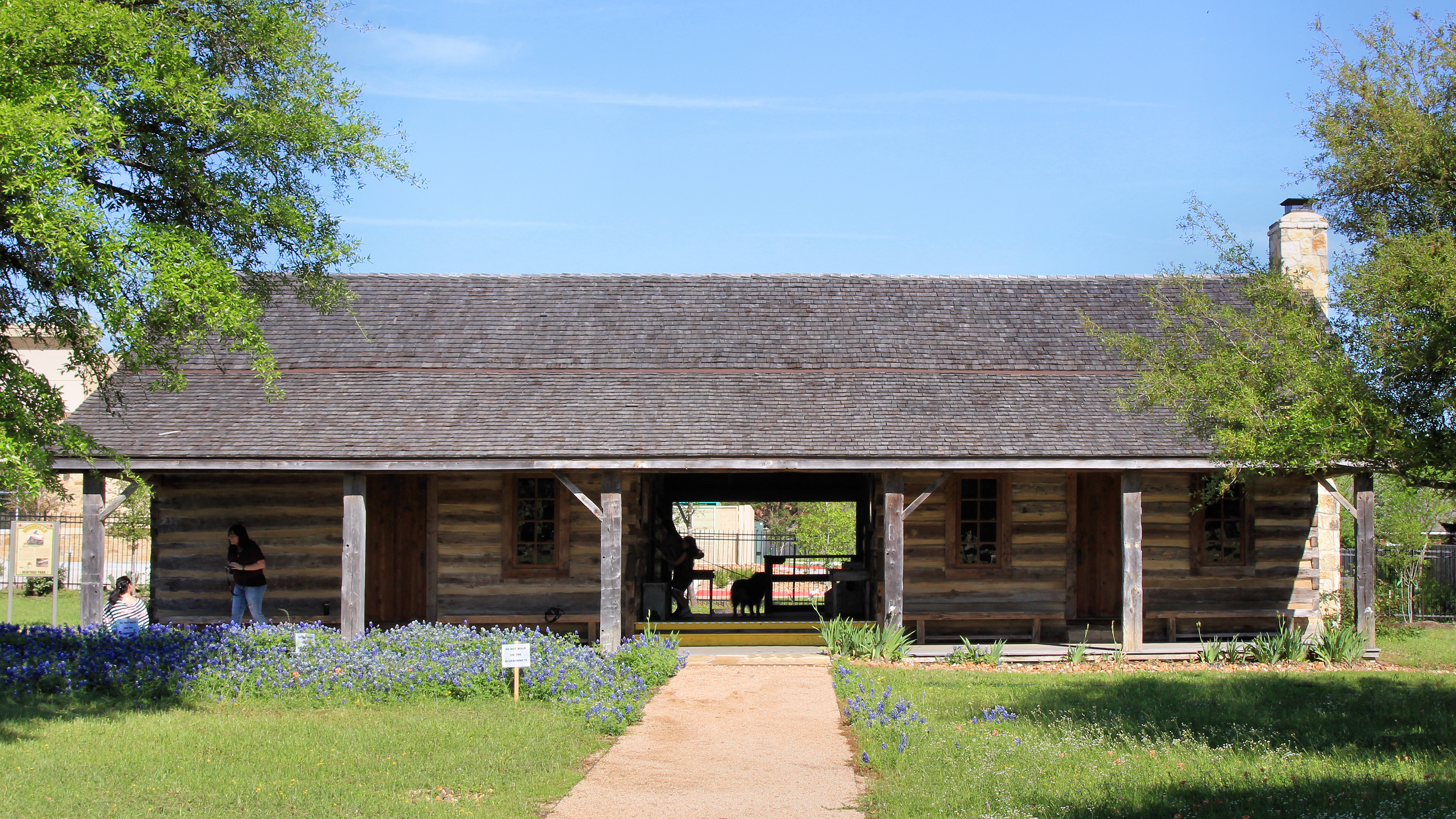
- The 1856 Turner Peters Log Cabin at the Boonville Heritage Park
- Interactive map of Boonville
- Coordinates: 30°40′15″N 96°19′29″W
- Country: United States
- State: Texas
- County: Brazos
- Founded: 1841
- Time zone: UTC−6 (Central)
  - Summer (DST): UTC−5 (CST)
- ZIP codes: 77802
- Area codes: 979
- Website: Boonville Heritage Park

Boonville was the first county seat of Brazos County, Texas, United States. It is now located in the city of Bryan, Texas.

== History ==
Boonville was the county seat in Brazos County (established as Navasota County) from 1841 to 1866. The Congress of the Republic of Texas established a committee that purchased its land and named it in honor of Mordecai Boon Sr., nephew of Daniel Boone. The committee that established the town included Mordecai Boon Sr., Joseph Ferguson, J. H. Jones, Eli Seale, and William T. Millican. The town was planned and organized around a town square. Many notable individuals made speeches and sermons at the town courthouse, including Sam Houston and the Reverends William M. Tryon and Robert Alexander. A stage line was extended from Houston through Boonville in 1850. After the Houston and Texas Central Railway was extended from Millican to Bryan in 1866, residents of Boonville elected to make Bryan the county seat.

The former town site is now located in Bryan near State Highway 6. Since the 1990s, a cemetery on Boonville Road has been the last remaining structure associated with Boonville. It is marked by a Texas Centennial monument

The area around the cemetery is now the Boonville Heritage Park as of early 2015. The park has new structures, including a log cabin built in 1856 and relocated from Grimes County. The park also features a Six Flags Over Texas Plaza, a replica of a "Twin Sister" cannon and interpretive panels.
