= Neil Sperry =

Neil Sperry is a Texas gardening and horticulture expert known for his books, magazine, radio program, and annual gardening show. Sperry was born and raised in College Station, Texas where he graduated A&M Consolidated High School as Salutatorian and Student Body President. He attended Texas A&M University and earned horticulture degrees from Ohio State University. He married his wife Lynn in 1967, and they now live in McKinney, Texas.

While in high school and at Texas A&M University he owned and operated a nursery. From 1970 to 1977, he worked as a Horticulture Specialist for the Texas Cooperative Extension.

Neil Sperry hosted a radio show on Dallas station KRLD 1080-AM for over thirty years. On his February 13, 2010 broadcast, Sperry informed his audience that KRLD was exercising a 180-day opt-out clause in their contract. His broadcasting there ended in summer 2010. He now hosts a show on WBAP.

Two of Sperry's books have become favorites of Texas gardeners. His Complete Guide to Texas Gardening (published 1982 with a second edition in 1991), has been popularly known as the "boot book," in reference to its cover art. It remained a primary reference for Texas gardeners until the publication of Neil Sperry's Lone Star Gardening in 2014. This 344-page book contains comprehensive plant listings and more than 800 photographs taken by Sperry, an avid photographer.

== Publications ==
- Neil Sperry's Lone Star Gardening: Texas' Complete Planting Guide and Gardening Calendar (ISBN 978-0-9916207-0-8; copyright 2014)
- Neil Sperry's Complete Guide to Texas Gardening (ISBN 978-0878337996), "the 4th best-selling gardening hardback in American history."
- 1001 Most Asked Texas Gardening Questions (ISBN 978-1565302297)
- Complete Guide to Texas Gardening: Landscapes, Lawns, Fruit, and Vegetables (ASIN B000MAMD7G)
- Gardening GreenBook Just For Texas (ASIN B000O7Y9ZG)
- Neil Sperry's Gardening GreenBook (ASIN B000O825ZQ)
- Neil Sperry's Texas Gardening (ASIN B0017GX06W)
- Gardens magazine (1987-May/June 2015)
- Neil Sperry's Gardens electronic magazine (July 2015- )

== Radio ==
- Texas Gardening (1980–present), a paid-programming weekly talk-show on KRLD and 60 other radio stations. On July 10, 2010, his talk show on KRLD moved to WBAP. Neil Sperry broadcast 1,573 weekends during his tenure at KRLD.

== Newspaper ==
- His weekly gardening column appears in 20 Texas newspapers.

== Recognition ==
- American Garden Communicator of the Year (American Association of Nurserymen)
- American Garden Communicator of the Year (United States Land Grant Universities)
- Man of the Year in Texas Agriculture (The Texas Cooperative Extension of Texas A&M)
- Member, Texas Radio Hall of Fame, inducted October 18, 2003.
- Volunteers of the Year, McKinney
- McKinney Citizen of the Year, 2003
- Collin County Living Legends, 2007

== Charitable Work ==
- Avenues Counseling Center past board president
- Serenity High School advisory board
- Crape Myrtle Trails of McKinney, chair
- Denton State School Chair, Volunteer Services Council board

== See also ==
- KRLD (AM)
- WBAP (AM)
