= Coulter Field =

Airport in Texas, United States

- IATA: CFD; ICAO: KCFD; FAA LID: CFD

Summary
- Airport type: Public
- Owner: City of Bryan
- Serves: Bryan, Texas
- Elevation AMSL: 367 ft (112 m)
- Coordinates: 30°42′56″N 096°19′53″W

Map
- Location within Texas

Runways
Direction	Length		Surface
Direction	ft	m	Surface
15/33	4,000	1,219	Asphalt
~~17/35~~	1,330	405	~~Turf~~ (Closed)

Statistics (2023)
- Aircraft operations (year ending 4/8/2023): 16,200
- Based aircraft: 69
- Source: Federal Aviation Administration

Coulter Field (IATA: CFD, ICAO: KCFD, FAA LID: CFD) is a public airport three miles northeast of Bryan, in Brazos County, Texas. It is owned by the City of Bryan which is part of the Bryan-College Station area. The airport is used for general aviation.

== History ==
Coulter Field has a long history with sport parachuting, with parachute jumps having been conducted since the mid-1950s. Ags Over Texas (AOT) was the home of the Texas A&M University skydiving team until its closure in 1999. In March 2002, Skydive Aggieland opened and is the current home of the Texas A&M University skydiving club. Texas governor Rick Perry completed a successful static-line skydive at AOT while he was attending Texas A&M University in the 1970s and former president George H. W. Bush (41) completed a tandem skydive at Coulter Field in cooperation with Skydive Aggieland and the Golden Knights a day prior to completing his last jump at his Presidential Library on Texas A&M University main campus.

== Facilities ==
Coulter Field covers 256 acres (104 ha) at an elevation of 367 feet (112 m). Its runway, 15/33, is 4,000 by 75 feet (1,219 x 23 m). A former turf runway, 17/35 is closed.

In the year ending April 8, 2023, the airport had 16,200 general aviation aircraft operations, average 44 per day. 73 aircraft were then based at the airport: 61 single-engine, 7 multi-engine, 3 jet, and 2 helicopter.

== See also ==
- List of airports in Texas
