= Syndric Steptoe =

American football player and administrator (born 1984)

Arizona Wildcats
- Title: Director of player development

Personal information
- Born: December 6, 1984 (age 41); Bryan, Texas, U.S.
- Listed height: 5 ft 9 in (1.75 m)
- Listed weight: 200 lb (91 kg)

Career information
- Position: Wide receiver (No. 12)
- High school: Bryan
- College: Arizona
- NFL draft: 2007: 7th round, 234th overall pick

Career history

Playing
- Cleveland Browns (2007–2009); Hartford Colonials (2010); Edmonton Eskimos (2012)*
- * Offseason or practice squad member only

Operations
- Arizona (2019–present) Director of player development

Awards and highlights
- First-team All-Pac-10 (2006)

Career NFL statistics
- Receptions: 19
- Receiving yards: 182
- Stats at Pro Football Reference

Syndric Marquis Steptoe (born December 6, 1984) is an American former professional football player who was a wide receiver in the National Football League (NFL). He was selected by the Cleveland Browns in the seventh round of the 2007 NFL draft. He played college football for the Arizona Wildcats.

Steptoe was also a member of the Hartford Colonials and Edmonton Eskimos.

== Early life ==
Steptoe attended Bryan High School, where he was a SuperPrep All-America selection as a wide receiver, along with a Dave Campbell's Texas High School Football Second-team Super Team selection. He was also listed on the Rivals.com Athletes 2003 national list at #48. He was also a Dallas Morning News Top 100, along with a Houston Chronicle state 100 selection. He was Second-team All-Texas Athlete' selection for 5atexasfootball.com. He was a Top 50 defensive back on fab50recruiting.com. As well as a PrepStar All-Midlands selection as an athlete'. He was also a Prep Football Report All-Southwest selection as a receiver, and also a SuperPrep Southwest selection at #30.

Steptoe recorded 32 receptions for 607 yards and five touchdowns as a junior. He also recorded 10 punt returns for 215 yards. He was a 5A All-District 13 honors and a Texas Football Second-team Super Team selection as a junior. He attended the U.S. Army All-American Camp that summer, and recorded a 37-inch vertical leap in the Texas Nike Camp. He finished in the top five in the 2002 District track championships in the long jump and 4×100 relay.

Steptoe was a team captain for the football team his final two years. He played mostly quarterback his senior season and earned First-team All-District 13-5A honors as a utility back. He played wide receiver, slot back, running back and quarterback in one game against Temple High School. He was also a three-year letterman as a Point guard on the basketball team as well. All-District and All-State academic honors as a senior.

== College career ==
=== Recruiting ===
Measureables
Ht.	Wt.	40 yd.	20 Shut.	Squat Max.	Vertical Jump	Bench Max.	Broad Jump
5'8"	170 lb.	4.41	X	552	37.9"	260	X"

On June 10, 2002, Steptoe, a three star Athlete (a player whom plays positions on offense as well as defense) recruit, named his top five colleges, which were Arkansas, Arizona, Texas, Texas A&M, and UCLA. And by December 9, he had narrowed his list down to three schools, Arkansas, Arizona, and UCLA. And on December 10, he announced he had signed a letter of intent with Arizona to play college football. However, after having committed to Arizona, he still visited SMU on January 11, 2003, as well as Arkansas on January 18. His decision wavered some and he said he "had some thinking to do". However, he decided to honor his commitment and attend Arizona.

=== Playing career ===
As a true freshman in 2003, Steptoe played in all 12 games. He started the final home game of the season against the national champion USC Trojans. He saw his first full-rotation play at receiver against Arizona State in the final game of the season and recorded a season-high and career-high seven receptions. He finished the Oregon game with four kickoff returns for a then career-best 99 yards, including a season-best long of 41-yards. For the season he recorded nine receptions for 77 yards. He also recorded 15 punt returns for 69 yards, an average of 4.6 yards per return, as well as, a school-record 28 kickoff returns for 480 yards, for an average of 17.1 yards per return.

As a sophomore in 2004, Steptoe started 10 games. He also earned All-Pac-10 honorable mention honors. He finished the season with 30 receptions for 446 yards and three touchdowns. He averaged 14.9 yards-per-reception and 44.6 yards-per-game. He ranked fourth in the conference in kick returns, with 17 kickoff returns for 384 yards, averaging 22.6 yards-per-return. He recorded six receptions for 68 yards against Arizona State. He recorded a career-long, 50-yard touchdown reception from quarterback Richard Kovalcheck during a road game against Washington, as well as three kickoff returns for 86 yards. Against Washington State, he recorded a career-high 105 yards on six receptions, including two touchdowns.

As a junior in 2005, Steptoe earned All-Pac 10 honorable mention for second consecutive year. He played in 10 games, eight starts, and recorded 37 receptions for 493 yards and 1,271 all-purpose yards. He ranked 24th in the nation with an 11.1-yard punt return average, and 27th in the nation with a kickoff return average of 25.5 yards. He ranked 42nd in the nation in all-purpose yards with 127.1 per game. He also became the school's career-leader in kickoff returns with 64. He recorded a 63-yard punt return touchdown against #7 UCLA. He recorded a career-high 76-yard kickoff return on the road against USC.

As a senior in 2006, Steptoe played in all 12 games. He recorded 55 receptions for 568 yards, and two touchdowns. He also carried the ball seven times for 34 yards. He also had one return for a touchdown.

While at Arizona, Steptoe was a Family studies and Human development major. He was also a Football representative to the Student-Athlete Advisory Board 2005–2006.

== Professional career ==
=== Pre-draft ===
Steptoe was invited, and attended the 2007 NFL Combine. He was recorded as the shortest wide receiver at the Combine that year.

Pre-draft measurables
Height	Weight	40-yard dash	10-yard split	20-yard split	20-yard shuttle	Three-cone drill	Vertical jump	Broad jump	Bench press
5 ft 8 5/8 in (1.74 m)	194 lb (88 kg)	4.61 s	1.65 s	2.68 s	4.17 s	7.05 s	33 in (0.84 m)	10 ft 4 in (3.15 m)	17 reps
Broad jump, shuttle, cone drill from Pro Day; all other values from NFL Combine.

=== Cleveland Browns ===
Steptoe was selected in the seventh round (234th overall) of the 2007 NFL draft by the Cleveland Browns.

Steptoe spent his rookie season on the Browns' practice squad. In preseason games before the 2008 season, his performance earned him a roster spot. He made his regular season NFL debut on September 7 against the Dallas Cowboys. It was his first career start, as wide receivers Joe Jurevicius and Donté Stallworth, along with wide receiver/kick returner Joshua Cribbs, did not play due to injuries. Steptoe entered the starting lineup, as well as serving as kickoff and punt returner. Steptoe injured his knee during the Browns' 2009 training camp and it was announced that he would miss the season. He was waived/injured and subsequently reverted to injured reserve on August 13.

=== Hartford Colonials ===
Steptoe was signed by the Hartford Colonials of the United Football League in September 2010.

=== Edmonton Eskimos ===
He was released by the Edmonton Eskimos on June 6, 2012
