= Brandon Joseph =

American football player (born 2001)

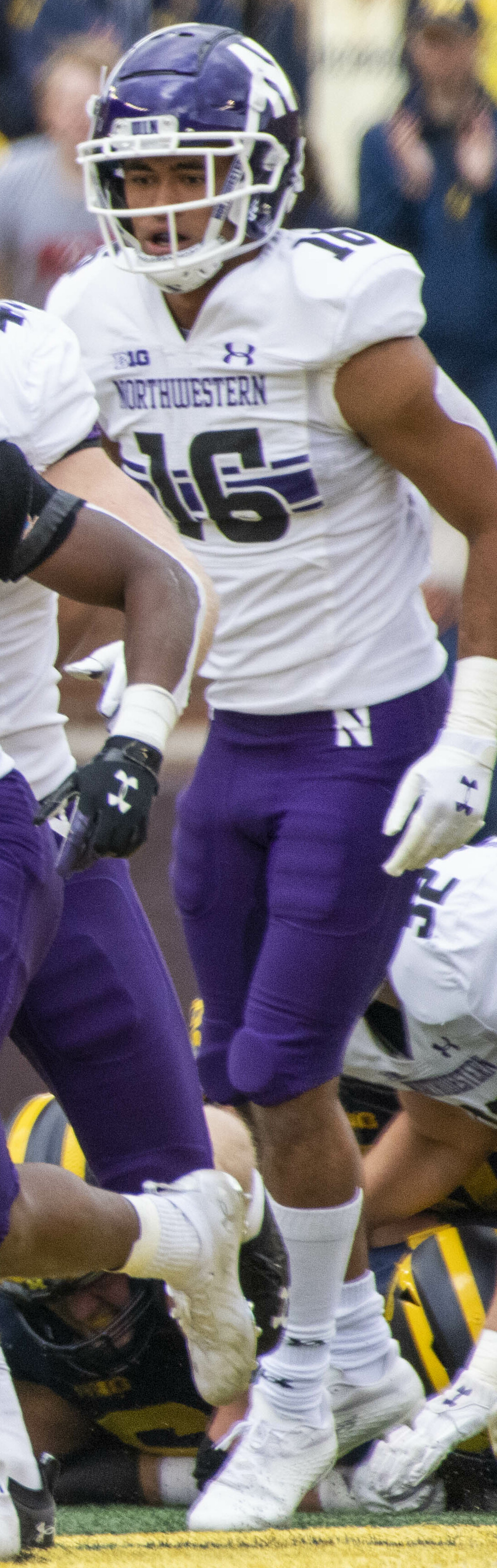
- Joseph with Northwestern in 2021

Profile
- Position: Safety

Personal information
- Born: February 5, 2001 (age 25); Austin, Texas, U.S.
- Listed height: 6 ft 0 in (1.83 m)
- Listed weight: 200 lb (91 kg)

Career information
- High school: College Station (College Station, Texas)
- College: Northwestern (2019–2021); Notre Dame (2022)
- NFL draft: 2023: undrafted

Career history
- Detroit Lions (2023–2024)

Awards and highlights
- First-team All-American (2020); Big Ten Freshman of the Year (2020); First-team All-Big Ten (2020); Second-team All-Big Ten (2021)

Career NFL statistics as of 2024
- Tackles: 13
- Pass deflections: 1
- Stats at Pro Football Reference

Brandon Alan Joseph (born February 5, 2001) is an American professional football safety. He has previously played in the National Football League (NFL) for the Detroit Lions. He played college football for the Northwestern Wildcats and Notre Dame Fighting Irish.

== Early life ==
Joseph grew up in College Station, Texas, and attended College Station High School. He was named Class 5A All-State as a senior after recording 95 tackles with 10 passes broken up and five interceptions. Joseph initially committed to play college football at Texas Tech, but ultimately decommitted to sign with Northwestern. He is of Antiguan and Italian descent.

== College career ==
Joseph redshirted his true freshman season at Northwestern University. As a redshirt freshman in 2020, Joseph was named first-team All-Big Ten Conference and the conference Freshman of the Year after he co-led the country with six interceptions. He was rated the nation's best strong safety by Pro Football Focus.

For the 2022 season, Joseph transferred to the University of Notre Dame.

== Professional career ==
Pre-draft measurables
Height	Weight	Arm length	Hand span	40-yard dash	10-yard split	20-yard split	20-yard shuttle	Three-cone drill	Vertical jump	Broad jump	Bench press
6 ft 0 3/8 in (1.84 m)	202 lb (92 kg)	30 7/8 in (0.78 m)	9 in (0.23 m)	4.62 s	1.56 s	2.64 s	4.22 s	6.84 s	34.5 in (0.88 m)	9 ft 10 in (3.00 m)	17 reps

Joseph was signed by the Detroit Lions as an undrafted free agent on May 12, 2023. He was waived on August 29, and re-signed to the practice squad. He signed a reserve/future contract on January 30, 2024.

Joseph made the Lions' roster in 2024, playing as a reserve defender and special teamer in 14 games before being waived on December 21, 2024.

== Personal life ==
On December 21, 2024, Joseph was arrested in Dearborn Heights, Michigan on suspicion of driving under the influence. The arrest came after Joseph was observed driving through the city at high rates of speed. He was not immediately charged, though, as police officials said they were waiting for results of the breathalyzer test.

== Career statistics ==
=== NFL ===
Year	Team	Games		Tackles					Interceptions						Fumbles		
Year	Team	GP	GS	Total	Solo	Ast	Sck	Sfty	PD	Int	Yds	Avg	Lng	TD	FF	FR	TD
2023	DET	2	0	0	0	0	0.0	0	0	0	0	0.0	0	0	0	0	0
2024	DET	14	1	13	11	2	0.0	0	1	0	0	0.0	0	0	0	0	0
Career		16	1	13	11	2	0.0	0	1	0	0	0.0	0	0	0	0	0

=== College ===
Year	Team	Games		Tackles				Interceptions				Fumbles		
Year	Team	GP	GS	Total	Solo	Ast	Sack	PD	Int	Yds	TD	FF	FR	TD
2019	Northwestern	4	0	4	4	0	0.0	0	0	0	0	0	0	0
2020	Northwestern	9	9	52	28	24	0.0	2	6	19	0	0	0	0
2021	Northwestern	12	12	80	54	26	1.0	4	3	26	0	0	1	0
2022	Notre Dame	10	10	30	15	15	0.0	1	1	29	1	1	0	0
Career		35	31	166	101	65	1.0	7	10	74	1	1	1	0
