= Kurten, Texas =

- Town

- Location within Texas
- Coordinates: 30°47′13″N 96°15′50″W
- Country: United States
- State: Texas
- County: Brazos

Government
  - Mayor: Chris Court

Area
  - Total: 4.62 sq mi (11.96 km^{2})
  - Land: 4.55 sq mi (11.79 km^{2})
  - Water: 0.062 sq mi (0.16 km^{2})
- Elevation: 341 ft (104 m)

Population (2020)
  - Total: 395
  - Density: 86.8/sq mi (33.5/km^{2})
- Time zone: UTC-6 (Central (CST))
  - Summer (DST): UTC-5 (CDT)
- ZIP code: 77808
- Area code: 979
- FIPS code: 48-39940
- GNIS feature ID: 2412850
- Website: www.kurtentexas.com

Kurten is a town located along U.S. Highway 190 in Brazos County, Texas, United States. As of the 2020 census, it had a population of 395. It was incorporated in 2000 and is part of the Bryan–College Station metropolitan area.

== Geography ==
Kurten is located in northern Brazos County along U.S. Route 190. It is 10 miles (16 km) northeast of Bryan and 26 miles (42 km) southwest of Madisonville. The town has a total area of 4.6 square miles (12.0 km^{2}), of which 4.6 square miles (11.8 km^{2}) is land and 0.077 square miles (0.2 km^{2}), or 1.38%, is water.

== Demographics ==
The median age of the population is 41.4 years. The median age is 40.6 years for males and 46.5 years for females. Economically, the median household income stands at $62,375, with a poverty rate of 5.41%. The rate of owner-occupied housing is 90.6%, and the median home value is estimated at $190,600.

In terms of racial composition, White residents constitute 52.8% of the population, whilst Hispanic or Latino residents account for 38.2%. Asian residents represent 7.4%, an increase from 0.3% recorded in 2020. Individuals identifying as two or more races make up 0.7%, Native Americans account for 0.5%, and Black or African American residents comprise 0.4%.

Historical population
Census	Pop.	Note	%±
2010	398		—
2020	395		−0.8%
U.S. Decennial Census; 2020 Census

== Education ==
The town is served by Bryan Independent School District (BISD).

Houston Elementary School is the main zoned elementary school, while bilingual students zoned to Houston attend Henderson Elementary School. All students are zoned to: Rayburn Intermediate School, Davila Middle School, and Rudder High School.

== History ==
In April 1906, the Kurten City Council passed a law that prohibited the sale and distribution of guinea fowl. Originally from Africa, these imported birds became very popular in the Central Texas region. However, their popularity declined as the guinea population faced a rapid increase in number. Consequently, the birds quickly became a problem for the local townspeople. They crowded the streets and became aggressive when confronted. In early April 1906, 11 different guinea fowl attacks had been reported, and the Kurten City Council passed the Fowl Redistribution Act.

Each year, Kurten holds its annual fireworks show on Independence Day at the Kurten Community Center. For 13 years, the fireworks show has drawn in large crowds from all over Central Texas.
