= KBXT =

- Wixon Valley, Texas; United States
- Broadcast area: Bryan-College Station
- Frequency: 101.9 MHz
- Branding: 101.9 The Beat

Programming
- Format: Urban contemporary
- Affiliations: American Urban Radio Networks

Ownership
- Owner: Brazos Valley Communications, Ltd.

History
- First air date: November 1994
- Former call signs: KPXQ (1991–1993, CP); KLTR (1993–1996); KZTR (1996–2007)
- Call sign meaning: From "Beat"

Technical information
- Licensing authority: FCC
- Facility ID: 57802
- Class: A
- ERP: 2,500 watts
- HAAT: 156.2 m (512 ft)
- Transmitter coordinates: 30°48′5″N 96°27′58″W

Links
- Public license information: Public file; LMS
- Webcast: Listen live
- Website: 1019thebeatfm.com

KBXT (101.9 FM, "The Beat") is a radio station broadcasting an Urban Contemporary music format. Licensed to Wixon Valley, Texas, United States, the station is currently owned by Brazos Valley Communications, Ltd. and features programming from American Urban Radio Networks. The station's studios are located in Bryan and its transmitter is located south of Hearne, Texas.

== History ==
The station was assigned the call sign KPXQ on July 12, 1991. On December 27, 1993, the station changed its call sign to KLTR, on December 20, 1996 to KZTR, and on December 13, 2007, to the current KBXT.

KZTR had originally signed on as an affiliate of Z-Rock in the mid '90s, moving toward classic rock when the network ceased operations. It took on a Top 40 format as "B-102" in November 1998, only to flip to Adult Contemporary as "101.9 The Valley" in 2001. By 2006 it started simulcasting the same audio as KTAM (1240 AM), whose format is regional Mexican.

On November 29, 2007, KZTR flipped to "The Beat" and adopted a Rhythmic format featuring Hip Hop/R&B and Rhythmic Pop hits. While it is a rhythmic format, it is a Hip Hop/R&B station replacement for KVJM after that station flipped to Spanish language more than a year earlier. KBXT has since shifted towards a Mainstream Urban direction.

The KBXT call sign was previously assigned to a station in the Duluth, MN market at AM 1490.
