= Wixon Valley, Texas =

- City
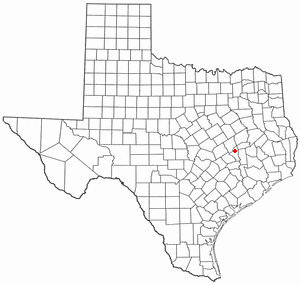
- Location of Wixon Valley, Texas

- Coordinates: 30°45′42″N 96°19′22″W
- Country: United States
- State: Texas
- County: Brazos

Area
  - Total: 1.81 sq mi (4.70 km^{2})
  - Land: 1.80 sq mi (4.65 km^{2})
  - Water: 0.019 sq mi (0.05 km^{2})
- Elevation: 335 ft (102 m)

Population (2020)
  - Total: 228
  - Density: 127/sq mi (49.0/km^{2})
- Time zone: UTC-6 (Central (CST))
  - Summer (DST): UTC-5 (CDT)
- FIPS code: 48-79919
- GNIS feature ID: 2412290

Wixon Valley is a city in Brazos County, Texas, United States. The population was 228 at the 2020 census. It is part of the Bryan-College Station metropolitan area.

== Geography ==
Wixon Valley is located in north-central Brazos County at 30°45′42″N 96°19′22″W (30.761566, –96.322682), along U.S. Route 190 and extending to the northwest. It is 7 miles (11 km) northeast of downtown Bryan.

According to the United States Census Bureau, Wixon Valley has a total area of 1.8 square miles (4.7 km^{2}), of which 0.02 square miles (0.05 km^{2}), or 1.12%, is water.

== Demographics ==
Historical population
Census	Pop.	Note	%±
1990	186		—
2000	235		26.3%
2010	254		8.1%
2020	228		−10.2%
U.S. Decennial Census; 1850–1900 1910; 1920 1930 1940; 1950 1960 1970; 1980 1990 2000; 2010 2020

=== 2020 census ===
As of the 2020 census, Wixon Valley had a population of 228 and a median age of 42.7 years. 26.3% of residents were under the age of 18 and 16.2% of residents were 65 years of age or older. For every 100 females there were 98.3 males, and for every 100 females age 18 and over there were 90.9 males age 18 and over.

0.0% of residents lived in urban areas, while 100.0% lived in rural areas.

There were 80 households in Wixon Valley, of which 38.8% had children under the age of 18 living in them. Of all households, 68.8% were married-couple households, 12.5% were households with a male householder and no spouse or partner present, and 17.5% were households with a female householder and no spouse or partner present. About 13.8% of all households were made up of individuals and 6.3% had someone living alone who was 65 years of age or older.

There were 101 housing units, of which 20.8% were vacant. The homeowner vacancy rate was 0.0% and the rental vacancy rate was 46.2%.

Racial composition as of the 2020 census
Race	Number	Percent
White	173	75.9%
Black or African American	24	10.5%
American Indian and Alaska Native	2	0.9%
Asian	0	0.0%
Native Hawaiian and Other Pacific Islander	0	0.0%
Some other race	0	0.0%
Two or more races	29	12.7%
Hispanic or Latino (of any race)	24	10.5%

=== 2000 census ===
As of the census of 2000, there were 235 people, 85 households, and 70 families residing in the city. The population density was 131.0 inhabitants per square mile (50.6/km^{2}). There were 88 housing units at an average density of 49.1 per square mile (19.0/km^{2}). The racial makeup of the city was 91.06% White, 7.66% African American, 0.43% from other races, and 0.85% from two or more races. Hispanic or Latino of any race were 2.55% of the population.

There were 85 households, out of which 34.1% had children under the age of 18 living with them, 68.2% were married couples living together, 15.3% had a female householder with no husband present, and 16.5% were non-families. 12.9% of all households were made up of individuals, and 9.4% had someone living alone who was 65 years of age or older. The average household size was 2.76 and the average family size was 3.03.

In the city, the population was spread out, with 30.2% under the age of 18, 6.4% from 18 to 24, 28.9% from 25 to 44, 19.6% from 45 to 64, and 14.9% who were 65 years of age or older. The median age was 36 years. For every 100 females, there were 85.0 males. For every 100 females age 18 and over, there were 76.3 males.

The median income for a household in the city was $53,750, and the median income for a family was $59,063. Males had a median income of $35,417 versus $25,938 for females. The per capita income for the city was $33,915. None of the families and 3.0% of the population were living below the poverty line, including no under eighteens and 6.5% of those over 64.

== Education ==
Wixon Valley is served by Bryan Independent School District (BISD).

Wixon Valley is split between the zones of Houston Elementary School and Bonham Elementary School. Bilingual students zoned to Bonham attend Bonham while bilingual students zoned to Houston attend Henderson Elementary School. All students are zoned to: Rayburn Intermediate School, Davila Middle School, and Rudder High School.
