= Brazos Transit District =

Transit agency in Texas

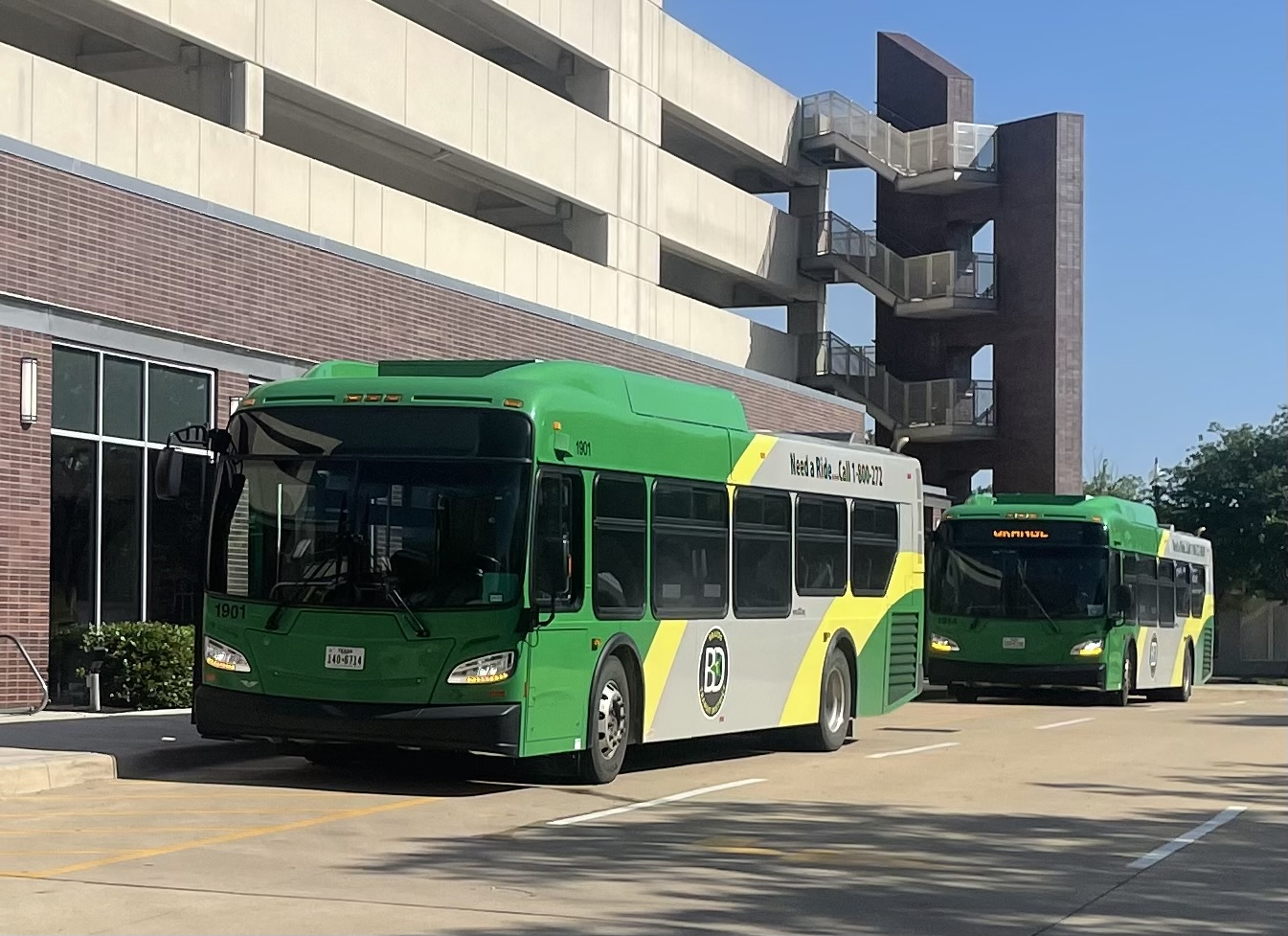
- Buses waiting at the North Terminal in downtown Bryan
- Founded: 1974
- Headquarters: 1759 N. Earl Rudder Freeway
- Locale: Bryan, Texas
- Service area: Brazos Valley
- Service type: bus service, paratransit
- Routes: 24
- Daily ridership: 2,000 (weekdays, Q1 2025)
- Annual ridership: 413,800 (2024)
- Website: btd.org

The Brazos Transit District, branded as The District, is the primary provider of mass transportation in a 16-county area of East Texas. The agency was established in 1974 as the Brazos Valley Transit Authority, with the primary purpose of providing fixed routes for Bryan and College Station, plus rural demand response service. Today, two separate urban areas feature fixed routes, Paratransit, Demand and Response plus a series of commuter buses for several Houston suburbs. In 2024, the system had a ridership of 413,800, or about 2,000 per weekday as of the first quarter of 2025.

== History ==
The Brazos Transit District was founded in 1974 to serve a seven-county area in the Brazos Valley in Texas. Federal Transit Administration Region VI—a federal administrative area including Oklahoma, Arkansas, Louisiana, New Mexico, and Texas—awarded the District Transit System of the Year for 2022.

== Services ==
=== Bryan/College Station ===
The heart of The District's services, the Bryan–College Station metropolitan area features seven local routes, serving as part of a two-tiered transportation strategy along with bus services provided for students by Texas A&M University.

- Blue Route- Transfer Center to Castle Heights
- Green Route- Transfer Center to Shadowood/TAMU
- Maroon Route- Transfer Center to West Park/TAMU
- Orange Route- Transfer Center to Bellevue/Park Forest
- Purple Route- Transfer Center to Boonville/Westwood Estates
- Red Route- Transfer Center to Central Bryan
- Yellow Route- Transfer Center to Regency South/Devonshire

=== Cleveland ===
A city loop is provided in the small city of Cleveland.

=== Dayton/Liberty ===
The interconnected cities of Liberty and Dayton featured a varied fixed route service, which at different times loops through each of the two cities, with occasional services that connect the two municipalities.

=== Lufkin ===
The small industrial city of Lufkin features five local routes, including one that extends to the town of Diboll.

- Orange Route- Angelina College to Diboll
- Purple Route- Jennings Station to Keltys
- Blue Route- Jennings Station to Hospitals
- Yellow Route- Jennings Station to Atkinson

=== Nacogdoches ===
The agricultural center of Nacogdoches includes four local routes, three of which provide some form of service to SFA State University.

- Blue Route- Transfer Center to Stallings Drive
- Green Route- Transfer Center to Fredonia Hill
- Red Route- Transfer Center to S.F. Austin University/Parker Road
