= Brazos County, Texas =

County in Texas, United States

- County
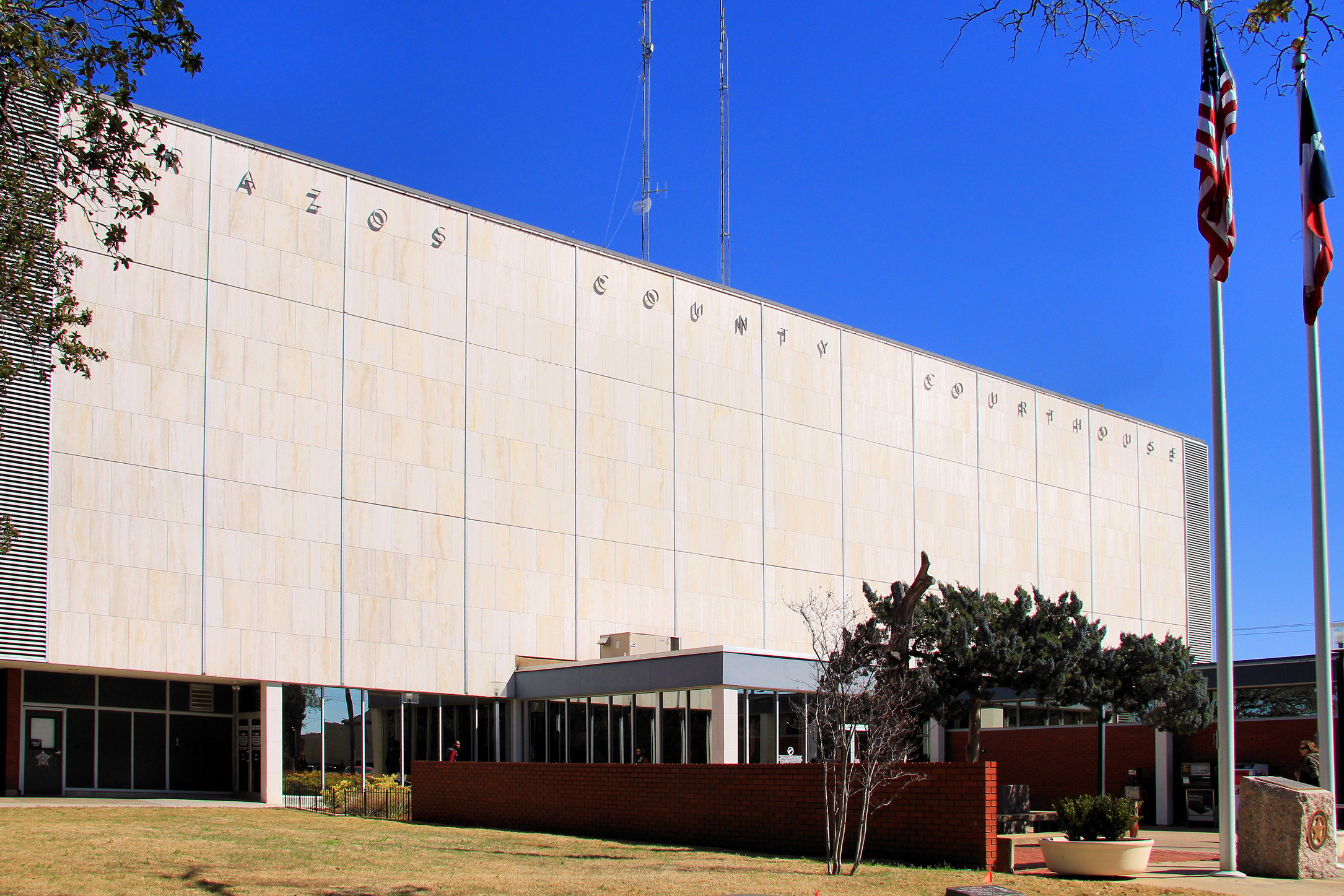
- The Brazos County Courthouse in Bryan

- Seal

- Location within the U.S. state of Texas
- Coordinates: 30°40′N 96°18′W
- Country: United States
- State: Texas
- Founded: 1843
- Named for: Brazos River
- Seat: Bryan
- Largest city: College Station

Area
  - Total: 591 sq mi (1,530 km^{2})
  - Land: 585 sq mi (1,520 km^{2})
  - Water: 5.8 sq mi (15 km^{2}) 1.0%

Population (2020)
  - Total: 233,849
  - Estimate (2025): 249,088 ▲
  - Density: 400/sq mi (154/km^{2})
- Time zone: UTC−6 (Central)
  - Summer (DST): UTC−5 (CDT)
- Congressional district: 10th
- Website: www.brazoscountytx.gov

Brazos County (/ˈbræzəs/ BRAZ-əs) is a county in the U.S. state of Texas. As of the 2025 population estimates, its population was 249,088. The county seat is Bryan. Along with Brazoria County, the county is named for the Brazos River, which forms its western border. The county was formed in 1841 and organized in 1843.

Brazos County is part of the Bryan-College Station Metropolitan Statistical Area, which consists of Bryan, College Station, and smaller cities and towns in Brazos, Burleson, and Robertson counties.

== History ==
In 1837, most of the area of present-day Brazos County was included in Washington County. The Brazos River, which bisected the latter, proved a serious obstacle to county government, and a new county, Navasota, was formed in January 1841. The first court, with Judge R. E. B. Baylor presiding, was held later that year in the home of Joseph Ferguson, fourteen miles west of the site of present Bryan. The county seat, named Boonville for Mordecai Boon, was located on John Austin's league and was surveyed by Hiram Hanover in 1841. In January of the following year Navasota County was renamed Brazos County.

Originally one of the state's poorer counties, the county (through the efforts of early settler Harvey Mitchell) donated 2,416 acres of land in the 1870s to create Texas A&M University, which has enabled the county to be among the state's most financially successful.

After the Civil War tens of thousands of new residents moved to Brazos County, attracted by its good lands, with plenty of timber and a patchwork of prairies and fertile floodplains. As newcomers poured in by the thousands the county suffered from arson, feuding, shooting and racial violence, including mob lynchings.

== Geography ==
According to the U.S. Census Bureau, the county has a total area of 591 square miles (1,530 km^{2}), of which 585 square miles (1,520 km^{2}) is land and 5.8 square miles (15 km^{2}) (1.0%) is water.

=== Adjacent counties ===
- Robertson County (northwest)
- Leon County (north)
- Madison County (northeast)
- Grimes County (east)
- Washington County (south)
- Burleson County (southwest)

The northwestern boundary follows the Old Spanish Trail.

== Demographics ==
Historical population
Census	Pop.	Note	%±
1850	614		—
1860	3,096		404.2%
1870	9,205		197.3%
1880	13,576		47.5%
1890	16,650		22.6%
1900	18,859		13.3%
1910	18,919		0.3%
1920	21,975		16.2%
1930	21,835		−0.6%
1940	26,997		23.6%
1950	38,390		42.2%
1960	44,895		16.9%
1970	57,978		29.1%
1980	93,588		61.4%
1990	121,862		30.2%
2000	152,415		25.1%
2010	194,851		27.8%
2020	233,849		20.0%
2025 (est.)	249,088	▲	6.5%
U.S. Decennial Census; 1850–2010 2010 2020

=== 2020 census ===
As of the 2020 census, the county had a population of 233,849. The median age was 26.0 years, 20.5% of residents were under the age of 18, and 9.9% of residents were 65 years of age or older. For every 100 females there were 100.6 males, and for every 100 females age 18 and over there were 100.0 males age 18 and over.

The racial makeup of the county was 60.0% White, 10.4% Black or African American, 0.7% American Indian and Alaska Native, 6.3% Asian, 0.1% Native Hawaiian and Pacific Islander, 10.1% from some other race, and 12.5% from two or more races. Hispanic or Latino residents of any race comprised 27.0% of the population.

88.1% of residents lived in urban areas, while 11.9% lived in rural areas.

There were 85,304 households in the county, of which 28.4% had children under the age of 18 living in them. Of all households, 38.3% were married-couple households, 25.2% were households with a male householder and no spouse or partner present, and 30.7% were households with a female householder and no spouse or partner present. About 29.3% of all households were made up of individuals and 6.8% had someone living alone who was 65 years of age or older.

There were 96,710 housing units, of which 11.8% were vacant. Among occupied housing units, 43.8% were owner-occupied and 56.2% were renter-occupied. The homeowner vacancy rate was 2.3% and the rental vacancy rate was 12.3%.

=== Racial and ethnic composition ===
Brazos County, Texas – Racial and ethnic composition Note: the US Census treats Hispanic/Latino as an ethnic category. This table excludes Latinos from the racial categories and assigns them to a separate category. Hispanics/Latinos may be of any race.
Race / Ethnicity (NH = Non-Hispanic)	Pop 1980	Pop 1990	Pop 2000	Pop 2010	Pop 2020	% 1980	% 1990	% 2000	% 2010	% 2020
White alone (NH)	71,989	87,139	100,647	115,252	123,035	76.92%	71.51%	66.03%	59.15%	52.61%
Black or African American alone (NH)	10,267	13,409	16,146	20,827	23,569	10.97%	11.00%	10.59%	10.69%	10.08%
Native American or Alaska Native alone (NH)	168	223	360	484	502	0.18%	0.18%	0.24%	0.25%	0.21%
Asian alone (NH)	1,099	4,248	6,066	9,982	14,621	1.17%	3.49%	3.98%	5.12%	6.25%
Native Hawaiian or Pacific Islander alone (NH)	x	x	69	82	210	x	x	0.05%	0.04%	0.09%
Other race alone (NH)	610	130	170	246	1,009	0.65%	0.11%	0.11%	0.13%	0.43%
Mixed race or Multiracial (NH)	x	x	1,704	2,573	7,836	x	x	1.12%	1.32%	3.35%
Hispanic or Latino (any race)	9,455	16,713	27,253	45,405	63,067	10.10%	13.71%	17.88%	23.30%	26.97%
Total	93,588	121,862	152,415	194,851	233,849	100.00%	100.00%	100.00%	100.00%	100.00%

=== 2000 census ===
As of the census of 2000, there were 152,415 people, 55,202 households, and 30,416 families residing in the county. The population density was 260 people per square mile (100 people/km^{2}). There were 59,023 housing units at an average density of 101 units per square mile (39/km^{2}). The racial makeup of the county was 74.45% White, 10.72% Black or African American, 0.36% Native American, 4.01% Asian, 0.07% Pacific Islander, 8.42% from other races, and 1.97% from two or more races. 17.88% of the population were Hispanic or Latino of any race. 15.3% were of German, 8.4% English, 7.3% Irish and 7.2% American ancestry according to Census 2000.

There were 55,202 households, out of which 27.90% had children under the age of 18 living with them, 41.30% were married couples living together, 10.00% had a female householder with no husband present, and 44.90% were non-families. 25.50% of all households were made up of individuals, and 5.00% had someone living alone who was 65 years of age or older. The average household size was 2.52 and the average family size was 3.16.

In the county, the population was spread out, with 21.50% under the age of 18, 32.00% from 18 to 24, 26.00% from 25 to 44, 13.80% from 45 to 64, and 6.70% who were 65 years of age or older. The median age was 24 years. For every 100 females, there were 102.10 males. For every 100 females age 18 and over, there were 100.30 males.

The median income for a household in the county was $29,104, and the median income for a family was $46,530. Males had a median income of $32,864 versus $24,179 for females. The per capita income for the county was $16,212. About 14.00% of families and 26.90% of the population were below the poverty line, including 21.60% of those under age 18 and 10.30% of those age 65 or over.

== Transportation ==
=== Public Transportation ===
The Brazos Transit District operates a fixed route bus service and paratransit throughout Bryan and College Station.

=== Major highways ===
- U.S. Highway 190
- State Highway 6
- State Highway 21
- State Highway 30
- State Highway 40
- State Highway 47
- State Highway 308
- State Highway OSR
- Farm to Market Road 50
- Farm to Market Road 60
- Farm to Market Road 158
- Farm to Market Road 159
- Farm to Market Road 974
- Farm to Market Road 1179
- Farm to Market Road 1687
- Farm to Market Road 2038
- Farm to Market Road 2223
- Farm to Market Road 2776
- Farm to Market Road 2154
- Farm to Market Road 2347
- Farm to Market Road 2818

=== Airport ===
Easterwood Airport, owned by Texas A&M, is the local commercial airport, with flights to Dallas/Fort Worth International Airport.

Coulter Field is in Bryan.

== Politics ==
United States presidential election results for Brazos County, Texas
Year	Republican		Democratic		Third party(ies)	
Year	No.	%	No.	%	No.	%
1912	142	14.90%	762	79.96%	49	5.14%
1916	273	20.87%	1,027	78.52%	8	0.61%
1920	277	12.75%	1,281	58.98%	614	28.27%
1924	255	10.43%	2,128	87.07%	61	2.50%
1928	738	33.23%	1,480	66.64%	3	0.14%
1932	195	6.96%	2,588	92.40%	18	0.64%
1936	45	1.69%	2,610	98.16%	4	0.15%
1940	617	12.92%	4,151	86.90%	9	0.19%
1944	464	10.61%	3,358	76.75%	553	12.64%
1948	1,533	27.72%	3,459	62.55%	538	9.73%
1952	4,681	52.62%	4,213	47.36%	2	0.02%
1956	4,942	58.58%	3,463	41.05%	31	0.37%
1960	4,553	43.46%	5,907	56.38%	17	0.16%
1964	4,003	33.31%	7,998	66.54%	18	0.15%
1968	6,839	43.90%	6,299	40.43%	2,441	15.67%
1972	14,243	71.03%	5,692	28.39%	116	0.58%
1976	15,685	58.75%	10,628	39.81%	387	1.45%
1980	17,798	60.25%	9,856	33.37%	1,885	6.38%
1984	34,733	73.55%	12,348	26.15%	140	0.30%
1988	29,369	65.72%	14,885	33.31%	436	0.98%
1992	23,943	48.53%	14,819	30.03%	10,578	21.44%
1996	22,082	57.14%	13,968	36.15%	2,594	6.71%
2000	32,864	70.01%	12,359	26.33%	1,718	3.66%
2004	37,594	69.22%	16,128	29.70%	587	1.08%
2008	37,465	63.85%	20,502	34.94%	706	1.20%
2012	37,209	66.49%	17,477	31.23%	1,276	2.28%
2016	38,738	57.64%	23,121	34.40%	5,352	7.96%
2020	47,530	55.71%	35,349	41.43%	2,434	2.85%
2024	56,671	61.63%	33,844	36.80%	1,446	1.57%

United States Senate election results for Brazos County, Texas1
Year	Republican		Democratic		Third party(ies)	
Year	No.	%	No.	%	No.	%
2024	54,153	59.03%	34,849	37.98%	2,743	2.99%

United States Senate election results for Brazos County, Texas2
Year	Republican		Democratic		Third party(ies)	
Year	No.	%	No.	%	No.	%
2020	49,346	58.63%	32,098	38.14%	2,717	3.23%
2026	36,655	45.82%	41,425	51.78%	1,920	2.40%

Texas Gubernatorial election results for Brazos County
Year	Republican		Democratic		Third party(ies)	
Year	No.	%	No.	%	No.	%
2022	35,768	59.66%	23,103	38.53%	1,083	1.81%
2026	38,883	48.47%	39,475	49.20%	1,868	2.33%

Brazos County is very conservative for a county dominated by a large university. It was one of the earliest areas of Texas to break away from Solid South Democratic voting. No Democratic presidential nominee has carried it since Texas native Lyndon Johnson in his 1964 landslide. While most such counties swung Democratic in the 1990s, Brazos County remained one of the primary Republican strongholds in Texas.

Underscoring the county's Republican bent, it tends to vote to the right of Texas as a whole. Since LBJ won it, only in 1968 and 2020 have Democrats received even 40% of the vote. Even Jimmy Carter failed to win 40% of the vote in 1976, despite being the last Democrat to win Texas.

In 2020, Joe Biden was the first Democrat to win over 40% of its vote since 1968, winning 41.43% of the vote. This was still well to the right of the state as a whole, as Biden lost the state 46.48-52.06%.

In the 2026 election for U.S. Senate, Brazos County voted for James Talarico, the Democratic candidate, by a 6% margin, making him the first senatorial Democrat to win it since Lloyd Bentsen in his 1988 landslide reelection. The county also backed Gina Hinojosa in the concurrent gubernatorial election.

Even after the county turned solidly Republican at the federal level, conservative Democrats continued to hold most local offices and state legislative seats as late as 1995. By the turn of the millennium, there were almost no elected Democrats left above the county level.

== Communities ==
=== Cities ===
- Bryan (county seat) (93,074 residents)
- College Station (129,076 residents)
- Navasota (partial) (10,340 residents)
- Wixon Valley (229 residents)

=== Towns ===
- Kurten (395 residents)

=== Census-designated place ===
- Lake Bryan

=== Unincorporated communities ===
- Allenfarm
- Cawthon
- Edge
- Fairview
- Harvey
- Millican - Former municipality
- Mooring
- Mudville
- Nelleva
- Peach Creek
- Smetana
- Tabor
- Wellborn

=== Ghost towns ===
- Boonville
- Cottonwood
- Dallam
- Dinkins
- Enright
- Macey
- Moore
- Reliance
- Sims
- Stone City
- Union
- Varisco
- Wicker
- Zack

== Education ==
School districts:

- Bryan Independent School District
- College Station Independent School District
- Navasota Independent School District

Blinn College is the designated community college for all of the county.

Texas A&M University, the largest university by enrollment in Texas, is located in College Station.

== See also ==
- National Register of Historic Places listings in Brazos County, Texas
- Recorded Texas Historic Landmarks in Brazos County
