= Plchovice =

- Municipality
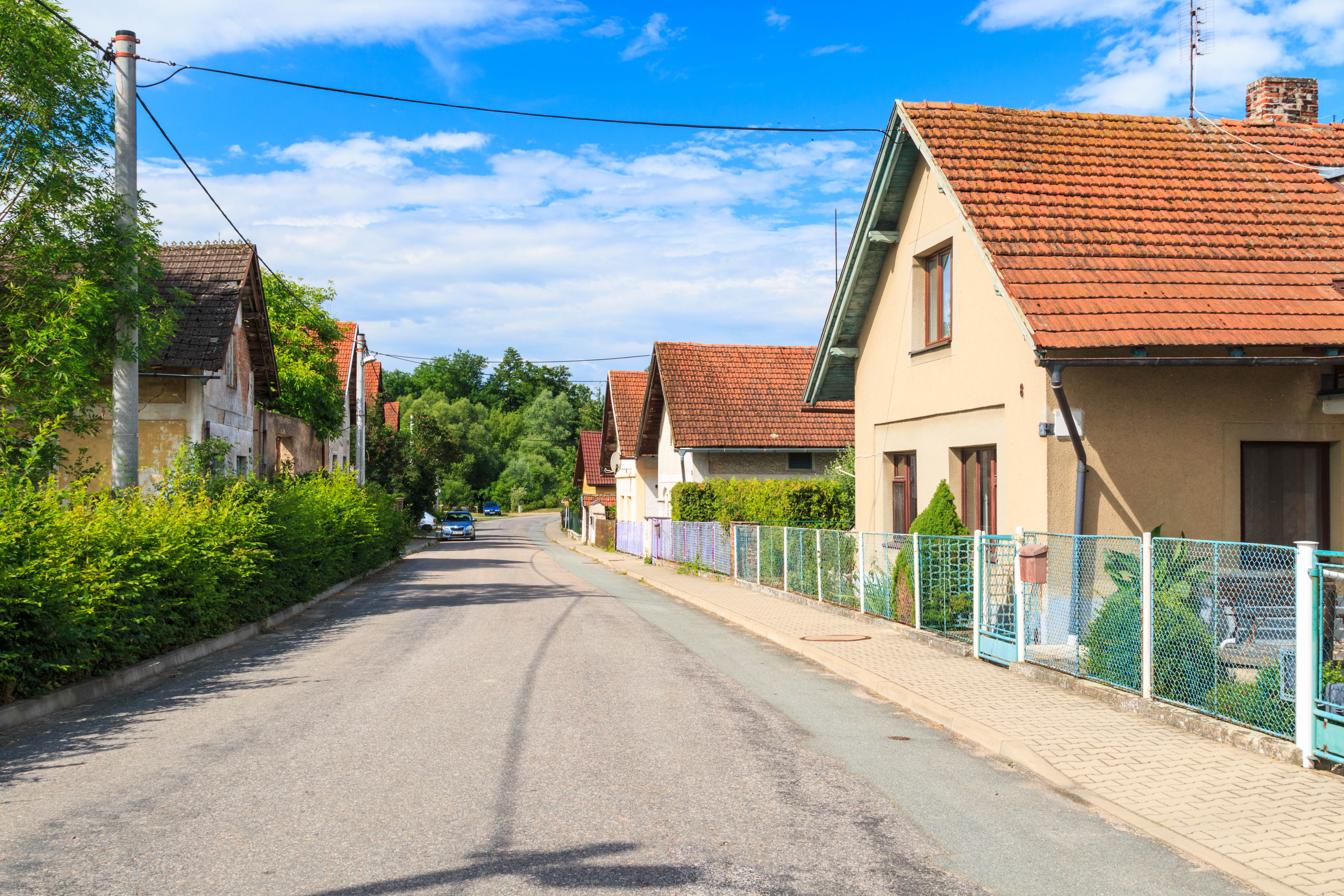
- Road through the village

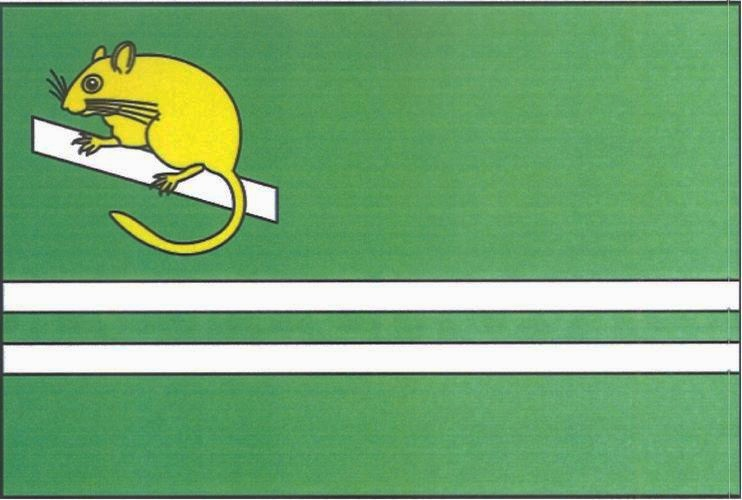
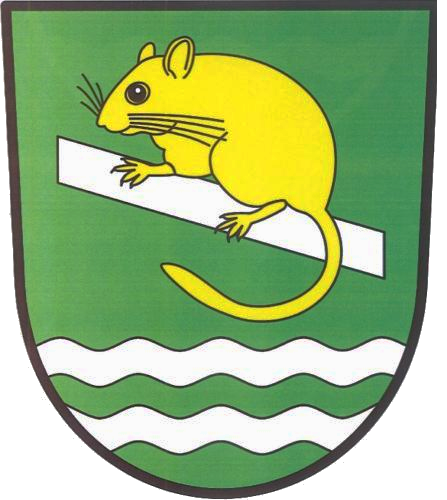
- Flag Coat of arms

- Location in the Czech Republic
- Coordinates: 50°2′42″N 16°10′53″E
- Country: Czech Republic
- Region: Pardubice
- District: Ústí nad Orlicí
- First mentioned: 1342

Area
  - Total: 2.88 km^{2} (1.11 sq mi)
- Elevation: 271 m (889 ft)

Population (2026-01-01)
  - Total: 73
  - Density: 25/km^{2} (66/sq mi)
- Time zone: UTC+1 (CET)
  - Summer (DST): UTC+2 (CEST)
- Postal code: 565 01
- Website: www.plchovice.cz

Plchovice (German: Pilchowitz) is a municipality and village in Ústí nad Orlicí District in the Pardubice Region of the Czech Republic. It has about 70 inhabitants.

== Administrative division ==
Plchovice consists of two municipal parts (in brackets population according to the 2021 census):

- Plchovice (48)
- Smetana (18)

== Etymology ==
The name is derived from the personal name Plch, meaning "the village of Plch's people".

== Geography ==
Choceň is located about 17 kilometres (11 mi) northwest of Ústí nad Orlicí and 28 km (17 mi) east of Pardubice. It lies in a flat agricultural landscape in the Orlice Table. The municipality is situated on the right bank of the Tichá Orlice River.

== History ==
The first written mention of Plchovice is from 1342. It was founded at the turn of the 13th and 14th centuries. Among the most notable owners of the village were Henry the Elder of Münsterberg and Vilém II of Pernštejn.

The village of Smetana was founded at the beginning of the 18th century. It was first mentioned in 1732. It has been a part of Plchovice since 1850, when the independent municipality of Plchovice was established.

== Demographics ==
Historical population

Year	Pop.	±%
1869	208	—
1880	203	−2.4%
1890	227	+11.8%
1900	211	−7.0%
1910	202	−4.3%

Year	Pop.	±%
1921	191	−5.4%
1930	191	+0.0%
1950	121	−36.6%
1961	105	−13.2%
1970	108	+2.9%

Year	Pop.	±%
1980	113	+4.6%
1991	78	−31.0%
2001	85	+9.0%
2011	84	−1.2%
2021	66	−21.4%

Source: Censuses

== Transport ==
There are no railways or major roads passing through the municipality.

== Sights ==
A technical monument is the underground water channel, which runs under the western part of the village. It was built by Count František Kinsky in 1853 to bring water to fields near Plchovice. After the completion of the channel, the fields were rented to Plchovice's farmers. The water in the channel comes from the Tichá Orlice River and nearby Jordán Stream. The channel is 3.1 m (10 ft) wide and 1.3 m (4.3 ft) high and the length counts 145 m (476 ft).
