= Bryan High School (Texas) =

Travis B. Bryan High School

Location
- 3450 Campus Drive; Bryan, Texas 77802; United States; 30.655474°N 96.334864°W

Information
- Type: Public high school
- Established: 1880
- School district: Bryan Independent School District
- Superintendent: Ginger Carrabine
- Principal: Dr. Gregory Bowhuis
- Teaching staff: 181.37 (FTE)
- Grades: 9-12
- Enrollment: 2,475 (2023–2024)
- Student to teacher ratio: 13.65
- Colors: Navy and silver
- Athletics conference: UIL Class 6A
- Team name: Vikings
- Website: Official Website

Travis B. Bryan High School, better known as Bryan High, is a public high school located in Bryan, Texas, United States. The school is in the Bryan Independent School District and is classified as a 6A school by the University Interscholastic League (UIL). For the 2024–25 school year, the school was given a "C" by the Texas Education Agency.

In addition to portions of Bryan, the school's attendance boundary includes small portions of College Station.

== Athletics ==
The Bryan Vikings compete in these sports -

- Baseball
- Basketball
- Cross Country
- Football
- Golf
- Powerlifting
- Soccer
- Softball
- Swimming and Diving
- Tennis
- Track and Field
- Volleyball
- Water Polo
- Wrestling

=== Football ===
The school has a 6A football program and is the long time rivals with A&M Consolidated High School in College Station, each year competing against each other in the "Crosstown Showdown."

== Notable alumni ==
- Rod Bernstine, former NFL tight end and running back
- Curtis Dickey (1976), NCAA track and field champion, NFL running back
- Odie Harris, former NFL defensive back
- David Konderla (1978), bishop of Tulsa
- Robert Nelson, former NFL center
- Nic Scourton (2022), college football defensive end
- Shawn Slocum (1983), football coach
- Cameron Spikes, former NFL guard
- Syndric Steptoe (2003), former NFL wide receiver
- Ty Warren (1999), former NFL defensive end
- Rudy Woods (1978), former professional basketball player
