= Millican, Texas =

Unincorporated community in Brazos County, Texas, United States

- Unincorporated community (Former municipality)
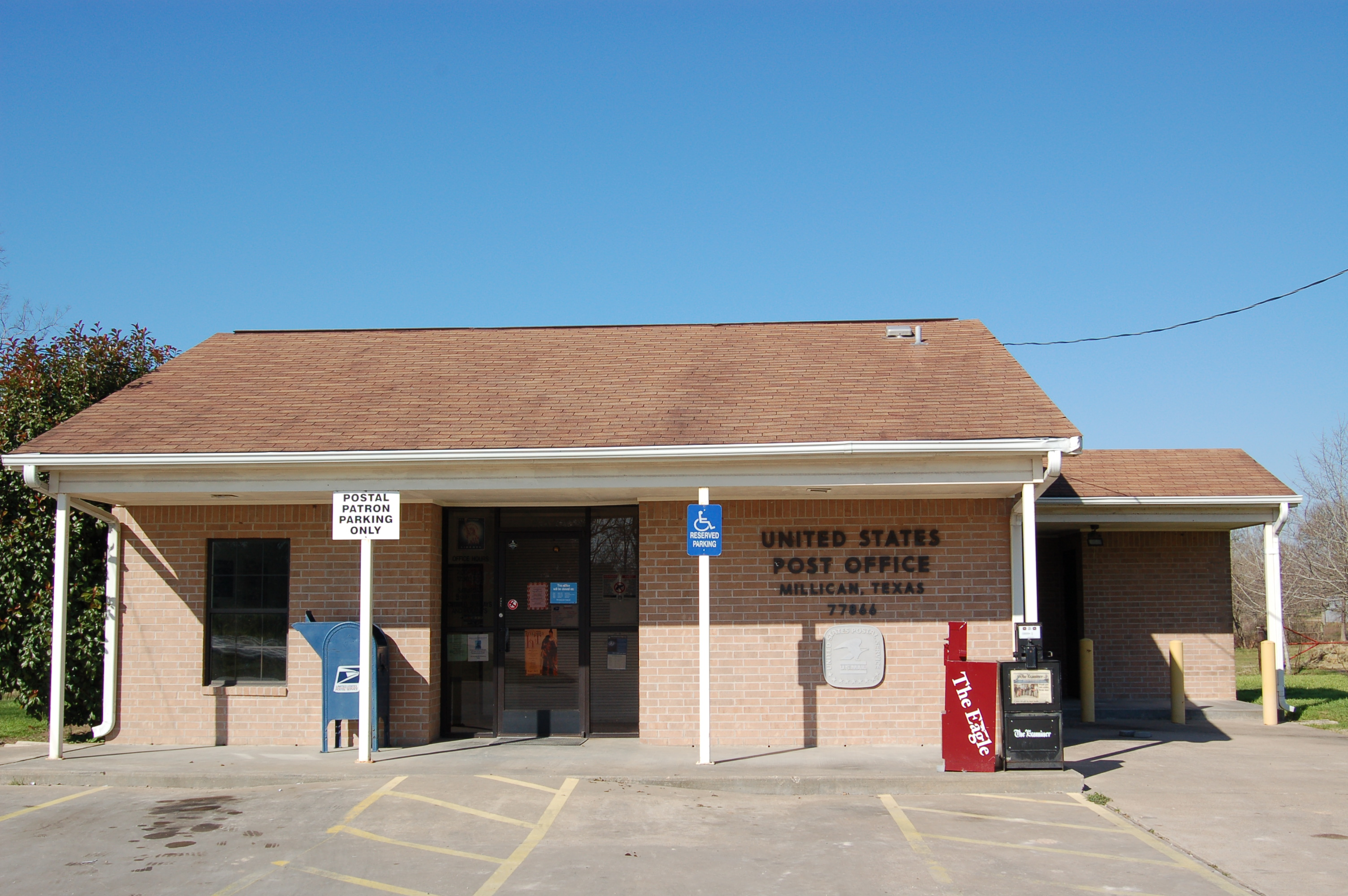
- Millican post office, February 2007

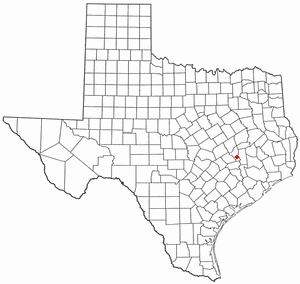
- Location of Millican, Texas

- Coordinates: 30°27′59″N 96°12′10″W
- Country: United States
- State: Texas
- County: Brazos

Area
  - Total: 4.0 sq mi (10.4 km^{2})
  - Land: 4.0 sq mi (10.4 km^{2})
  - Water: 0.0039 sq mi (0.01 km^{2})
- Elevation: 312 ft (95 m)

Population (2010)
  - Total: 240
  - Density: 60/sq mi (23.1/km^{2})
- Time zone: UTC-6 (Central (CST))
  - Summer (DST): UTC-5 (CDT)
- ZIP code: 77866
- Area code: 979
- FIPS code: 48-48516
- GNIS feature ID: 1362920

Millican is an unincorporated community and former municipality in Brazos County, Texas, United States. The population was 240 at the 2010 census, up from 108 at the 2000 census. It is part of the Bryan–College Station metropolitan area. Millican is named after Robert Millican, the first white settler of the region that would come to be known as Brazos County.

== History ==
The area was settled by Robert Hemphill Millican and his son Dr. Elliott McNeil Millican in the 1820s. By 1845, it was known as Millican Crossroads, opening a post-office in 1849 and a stage-coach station in 1850.

As the terminus of the Houston and Texas Central Railway between 1860 and 1867, the town grew. It served as a training camp for 5,000 Confederate soldiers during the Civil War.

From July 15–17, 1868, Millican was the site of racial violence when a group of Blacks and a group of Whites confronted one another over the rumor of a lynching of a black man near the Brazos River. A skirmish erupted and lasted for several days in what one historian has called "“the worst incident of racial violence in Texas during Reconstruction.”

The community was formerly an incorporated municipality. A letter sent to Greg Abbott, then the Texas Attorney General, from the Brazos County Attorney, Jim Kuboviak, stated that an either an election of 1866 or a "special act" law passed by the Texas Legislature had incorporated Millican as a municipality, and that the community had one person serving as mayor. However, after 1871, no municipal government officials had ever taken office, neither via appointment nor via being voted into power. By 2006 there was no collection of taxation for any municipal services, and Brazos County officials wanted Abbott to determine if Millican's incorporation was still in effect. This would determine whether the county could make decisions with providing services to Millican. A lawyer that Brazos County used as a consultant had stated that she could not find proof that the municipality ever dissolved.

In November 2006 the Office of the Texas Attorney General made a ruling stating that Millican was not an incorporated municipality due to a law that was enacted in 1897 stating that a city which had no executive officials in a period of at least 10 years would automatically dissolve; this law was in effect until 1925, and so Millican would have dissolved automatically. The determination allowed a land developer to move forward with a project as there was no city council to deal with.

== Geography ==
Millican is located in southern Brazos County at 30°27′59″N 96°12′10″W. It is 14 miles (23 km) southeast of the city of College Station.

According to the United States Census Bureau, Millican has a total area of 4.0 square miles (10.4 km^{2}), of which 0.004 square miles (0.01 km^{2}), or 0.11%, is water.

== Demographics ==
Historical population
Census	Pop.	Note	%±
2000	108		—
2010	240		122.2%
2019 (est.)	243		1.3%
U.S. Decennial Census

As of the census of 2000, there were 108 people, 41 households, and 31 families residing in the town. The population density was 26.9 inhabitants per square mile (10.4/km^{2}). There were 49 housing units at an average density of 12.2 per square mile (4.7/km^{2}). The racial makeup of the town was 94.44% White, 1.85% African American, 1.85% Asian, 1.85% from other races. Hispanic or Latino of any race were 1.85% of the population.

There were 41 households, out of which 29.3% had children under the age of 18 living with them, 63.4% were married couples living together, 9.8% had a female householder with no husband present, and 22.0% were non-families. 19.5% of all households were made up of individuals, and 14.6% had someone living alone who was 65 years of age or older. The average household size was 2.63 and the average family size was 2.91.

In the town, the population was spread out, with 25.0% under the age of 18, 10.2% from 18 to 24, 28.7% from 25 to 44, 21.3% from 45 to 64, and 14.8% who were 65 years of age or older. The median age was 36 years. For every 100 females, there were 86.2 males. For every 100 females age 18 and over, there were 88.4 males.

The median income for a household in the town was $14,643, and the median income for a family was $20,114. Males had a median income of $36,250 versus $56,250 for females. The per capita income for the town was $13,821. There were no families living or children below the poverty line, however, 6.0% of the population was living below the poverty line including 16.3% of those over 64.

== Education ==
Millican is served by the Navasota Independent School District. Navasota High School is the district's comprehensive high school.

== Notable people ==
- Mary Carson (1876–1951), operatic soprano and voice teacher; born in Millican
