= College Station Independent School District =

School district in Texas, United States

Address
- 1812 Welsh Ave College Station, Texas, 77840; United States
- Coordinates: 30.592879°N 96.321606°W

District information
- Type: Public
- Motto: "Success: Each Life, Each Day, Each Hour"
- Grades: Pre-K–12
- Superintendent: Tim Harkrider
- Schools: 21
- NCES District ID: 4807350

Students and staff
- Students: 14,366 (2023–2024)
- Teachers: 1,009.00 (on an FTE basis) (2023–2024)
- Staff: 1,093.53 (on an FTE basis) (2023–2024)
- Student–teacher ratio: 14.24 (2023–2024)

Other information
- Website: www.csisd.org

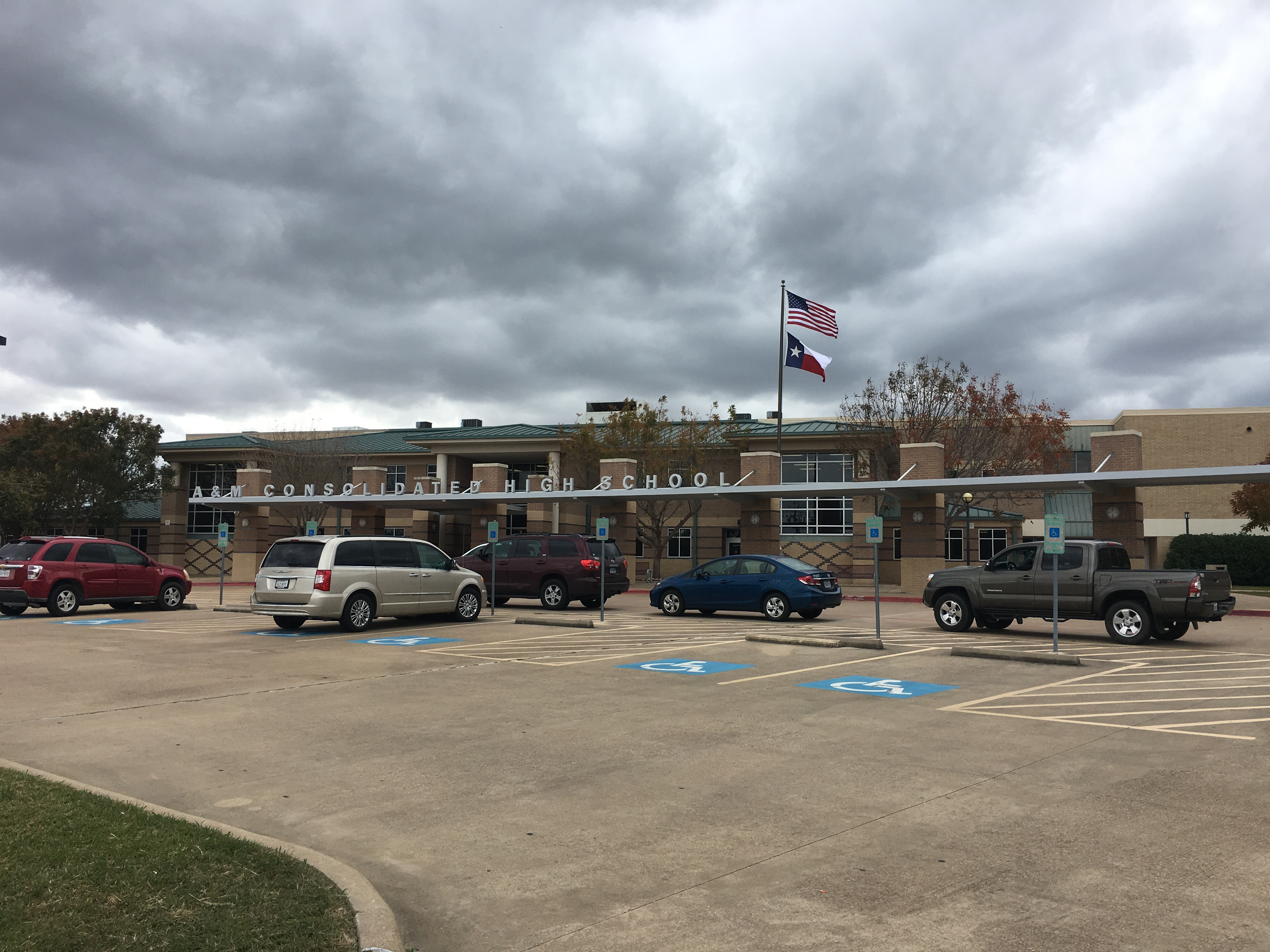
A&M Consolidated High School

College Station Independent School District is a public school district based in College Station, Texas, United States. Its boundary includes almost all of College Station.

In 2009, the school district was rated "academically acceptable" by the Texas Education Agency.

== Schools ==
=== High schools (Grades 9–12) ===
- A&M Consolidated High School
- College Station High School
- College View High School

=== Middle schools (Grades 7–8) ===
- A&M Consolidated Middle School
- College Station Middle School
- Wellborn Middle School

=== Intermediate schools (Grades 5–6) ===
- Cypress Grove Intermediate School
- Oakwood Intermediate School
- Pecan Trail Intermediate School

=== Elementary schools (Grades PK–4) ===
- College Hills Elementary School
- Creek View Elementary School
- Forest Ridge Elementary School
- Greens Prairie Elementary School
- Pebble Creek Elementary School
- River Bend Elementary School
- Rock Prairie Elementary School
- South Knoll Elementary School
- Southwood Valley Elementary School
- Spring Creek Elementary School

== See also ==
- Bryan Independent School District
