= Bryan Independent School District =

School district in Texas, United States

Address
- 801 South Ennis Street Bryan, Texas, 77803; United States

District information
- Type: Public
- Grades: PK–12
- Schools: 26
- NCES District ID: 4811790

Students and staff
- Students: 15,897 (2023–2024)
- Teachers: 1,190.44 (on an FTE basis) (2023–2024)
- Staff: 1,442.28 (on an FTE basis) (2023–2024)
- Student–teacher ratio: 13.35 (2023–2024)

Other information
- Website: www.bryanisd.org

Bryan Independent School District is a public school district based in Bryan, Texas (USA). It also serves rural areas in northern Brazos County, and a small portion of Robertson County.

Within Brazos County it includes Bryan, Kurten, Lake Bryan, Wixon Valley, and small portions of College Station.

In 2009 the school district was rated "academically acceptable" by the Texas Education Agency.

== High schools ==
- Mary Catherine Harris School of Choice
- Bryan Collegiate High School
- James Earl Rudder High School
- Bryan High School, established 1971; superseded Stephen F. Austin High School (now middle school)

== Middle schools ==
- Arthur L. Davila Middle School
- Sam Rayburn Intermediate School
- Sadberry Intermediate School
- Jane Long Intermediate School
- Stephen F. Austin Middle School - (Formerly Stephen F. Austin High School)

== Elementary schools ==
- Bonham Elementary School
- Bowen Elementary School (2000-01 National Blue Ribbon School)
- Mary Branch Elementary School
- Carver Early Childhood School - Pre-K
- Crockett Elementary School
- Fannin Elementary School
- Henderson Elementary School
- Houston Elementary School
- Johnson Elementary School (National Blue Ribbon School in 1998-99 and 2007-2010)
- Anson Jones Elementary School
- Kemp Carver Elementary School (Formerly E.A. Kemp High School)
- Harvey Mitchell Elementary School
- Navarro Elementary School
- Robert C. Neal Elementary School
- Sul Ross Elementary School

== See also ==
- Texas Education Agency
