= Bryan, Texas =

City in Texas, US

- City
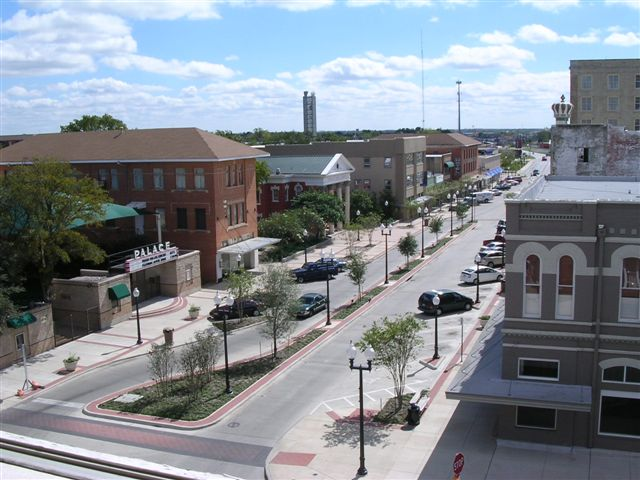
- Downtown Bryan, 2009

- Flag Seal
- Nicknames: The Good Life, Texas Style
- Interactive map of Bryan, Texas
- Location within Texas Location within the United States
- Coordinates: 30°40′28″N 96°22′12″W
- Country: United States
- State: Texas
- County: Brazos
- Incorporated: 1871

Government
  - Type: Council–Manager
  - Mayor: Bobby Gutierrez
  - City Manager: Kean Register

Area
  - Total: 54.26 sq mi (140.53 km^{2})
  - Land: 54.16 sq mi (140.28 km^{2})
  - Water: 0.097 sq mi (0.25 km^{2})
- Elevation: 361 ft (110 m)

Population (2020)
  - Total: 83,980
  - Density: 1,592.9/sq mi (615.01/km^{2})
- Time zone: UTC−6 (CST)
  - Summer (DST): UTC−5 (CDT)
- ZIP codes: 77801-03, 77807-08
- Area code: 979
- FIPS code: 48-10912
- GNIS feature ID: 2409927
- Website: www.bryantx.gov

Bryan is a city in and the county seat of Brazos County, Texas, United States. It is located in the heart of the Brazos Valley (East and Central Texas). As of the 2020 census, the city had a population of 83,980. Bryan borders the city of College Station, which lies to its south. Together they make up the Bryan–College Station metropolitan area, the 15th-largest metropolitan area in Texas with 268,248 people as of 2020.

== History ==
The area around Bryan was part of a land grant to Moses Austin by Spain. Austin's son, Stephen F. Austin, helped bring settlers to the area. Among the settlers was William Joel Bryan, the nephew of Stephen Austin. In 1866, the county seat of Brazos County was changed from Boonville to Bryan, and a post office was opened. In 1867, after many delays caused by the Civil War, the Houston and Texas Central Railroad, which had only previously gotten as far as Millican, finally reached Bryan. A short time later, in 1871, the city of Bryan became incorporated. Just south of Bryan, the Agricultural and Mechanical College of Texas opened in 1876 in what would later be known as College Station. The following year, 1877 saw the establishment of the Bryan Independent School District. Keeping up with progress in the rest of the country, Bryan added electric lighting and a waterworks to its community in 1889. The fifth Brazos County courthouse was built in 1892, and by the turn of the century, in 1900, the International-Great Northern Railroad stopped in Bryan.

Using a grant of $10,000 from Andrew Carnegie, the Carnegie Library of Bryan opened its doors in 1902. A bell, made in 1905 and rung in 1918 to signal the end of World War I, is still located out front today. In 1910, the town built an interurban railroad to College Station. By 1923, the line was abandoned. The first Jewish place of worship, the Temple Freda synagogue, was opened in 1913. During the 1930s, the town of North Oakwood merged with Bryan. Now Bryan and College Station are "twin" cities. In 1936, State Highway 6 was built, running right through town.

In 2006, the Texas A&M University System announced that the new Texas A&M Health Science Center campus would be built in Bryan near the new Traditions Golf Course development.

A fire at the El Dorado Chemical Co. in 2009 caused the evacuation of 70,000 residents due to the burning of ammonium nitrate, possibly causing minor respiratory problems. However, the city requested that only "anyone who can smell smoke or see smoke to evacuate their homes and businesses" and did not enforce an evacuation except for 500 homes in the nearby vicinity of the fire. Less than 1,000 residents chose to evacuate, taking shelter at Texas A&M University, which closed its campus for the day to ease traffic problems. City fire officials chose to let the fire burn down before tackling it, since the chemicals were water reactive. The evacuation, which started at 2:30 pm CST ended at 7 pm, except for a small, defined area immediately around the fire, where approximately 100 Bryan residents lived. In the end, only 500 residents were under a mandatory evacuation, and 35 people were treated for respiratory problems from the smoke. Officials from El Dorado said there was never any danger from the smoke or fire. The warehouse, valued at just under $1 million, was destroyed.

In 2010, the Brazos County District Attorney's Office started the enforcement of a "Gang Safety Zone" in response to an escalation in violence within Bryan. Major US papers and ABC News covered this move. Cities like Houston and Los Angeles looked to the Bryan model of safety enforcement surrounding gang violence. The injunction declared a 3.2-mile (5.1 km) area in Bryan as the Gang Safety Zone. This placed about half of downtown in the area.

In 2013 the Planned Parenthood clinic in Bryan closed as a result of state budget cuts which impacted family-planning facilities. The facility began offering abortions in 1998; it was one of three in the state which ceased operations on August 31, 2013. In 2014, the building was bought by 40 Days for Life.

== Geography ==
Bryan is located northwest of the center of Brazos County. It is bordered to the southeast by the city of College Station and to the northwest by the unincorporated community of Lake Bryan. The Brazos River flows past approximately nine miles to the southwest. According to the United States Census Bureau, the city has a total area of 44.5 square miles (115.3 km^{2}), of which 44.4 square miles (115.0 km^{2}) is land and 0.077 square miles (0.2 km^{2}), or 0.20%, is water.

=== Climate ===
The local climate is humid subtropical and temperate, and winters are mild with periods of low temperatures usually lasting less than two months. Snow and ice are extremely rare. Summers are warm and hot with occasional showers being the only real variation in weather.

Climate data for Bryan, Texas
Month	Jan	Feb	Mar	Apr	May	Jun	Jul	Aug	Sep	Oct	Nov	Dec	Year
Record high °F (°C)	86 (30)	99 (37)	96 (36)	96 (36)	100 (38)	107 (42)	110 (43)	109 (43)	112 (44)	102 (39)	94 (34)	89 (32)	112 (44)
Mean daily maximum °F (°C)	61.0 (16.1)	64.8 (18.2)	71.7 (22.1)	78.9 (26.1)	85.8 (29.9)	91.7 (33.2)	94.8 (34.9)	96.2 (35.7)	90.5 (32.5)	81.4 (27.4)	71.0 (21.7)	62.3 (16.8)	79.2 (26.2)
Mean daily minimum °F (°C)	41.2 (5.1)	44.4 (6.9)	51.0 (10.6)	58.1 (14.5)	66.6 (19.2)	72.7 (22.6)	74.6 (23.7)	74.5 (23.6)	69.4 (20.8)	60.3 (15.7)	50.5 (10.3)	42.2 (5.7)	58.8 (14.9)
Record low °F (°C)	−3 (−19)	5 (−15)	17 (−8)	28 (−2)	42 (6)	53 (12)	58 (14)	58 (14)	42 (6)	29 (−2)	19 (−7)	2 (−17)	−3 (−19)
Average precipitation inches (mm)	3.24 (82)	2.85 (72)	3.17 (81)	2.66 (68)	4.33 (110)	4.45 (113)	2.14 (54)	2.68 (68)	3.18 (81)	4.91 (125)	3.22 (82)	3.23 (82)	40.06 (1,018)
Source: weather.gov

== Demographics ==
Historical population
Census	Pop.	Note	%±
1890	2,979		—
1900	3,589		20.5%
1910	4,132		15.1%
1920	6,307		52.6%
1930	7,814		23.9%
1940	11,842		51.5%
1950	18,072		52.6%
1960	27,542		52.4%
1970	33,719		22.4%
1980	44,337		31.5%
1990	55,002		24.1%
2000	65,660		19.4%
2010	76,201		16.1%
2020	83,980		10.2%
2023 (est.)	89,615		6.7%
U.S. Decennial Census; 1850–1900 1910; 1920 1930 1940 1950 1960 1970 1980 1990 2000; 2010

=== Racial and ethnic composition ===
Bryan city, Texas – Racial and ethnic composition Note: the US Census treats Hispanic/Latino as an ethnic category. This table excludes Latinos from the racial categories and assigns them to a separate category. Hispanics/Latinos may be of any race.
Race / Ethnicity (NH = Non-Hispanic)	Pop 2000	Pop 2010	Pop 2020	% 2000	% 2010	% 2020
White alone (NH)	33,943	32,772	33,220	51.70%	43.01%	39.56%
Black or African American alone (NH)	11,520	13,406	12,876	17.54%	17.59%	15.33%
Native American or Alaska Native alone (NH)	152	175	117	0.23%	0.23%	0.14%
Asian alone (NH)	1,063	1,278	2,028	1.62%	1.68%	2.41%
Pacific Islander alone (NH)	25	40	83	0.04%	0.05%	0.10%
Some Other Race alone (NH)	53	78	379	0.08%	0.10%	0.45%
Mixed race or Multiracial (NH)	633	835	2,453	0.96%	1.10%	2.92%
Hispanic or Latino (any race)	18,271	27,617	32,824	27.83%	36.24%	39.09%
Total	65,660	76,201	83,980	100.00%	100.00%	100.00%

=== 2020 census ===
Racial composition as of the 2020 census
Race	Percent
White	50.4%
Black or African American	15.8%
American Indian and Alaska Native	0.9%
Asian	2.5%
Native Hawaiian and Other Pacific Islander	0.1%
Some other race	14.5%
Two or more races	15.8%
Hispanic or Latino (of any race)	39.1%

As of the 2020 census, there were 83,980 people, 32,335 households, and 18,659 families residing in the city. The median age was 31.6 years, 23.7% of residents were under the age of 18, and 12.3% of residents were 65 years of age or older; for every 100 females there were 97.4 males, and for every 100 females age 18 and over there were 95.1 males age 18 and over.

98.2% of residents lived in urban areas, while 1.8% lived in rural areas.

Of the 32,335 households in Bryan, 29.9% had children under the age of 18 living in them, 37.8% were married-couple households, 22.7% were households with a male householder and no spouse or partner present, and 32.7% were households with a female householder and no spouse or partner present. About 31.6% of all households were made up of individuals and 9.8% had someone living alone who was 65 years of age or older.

There were 36,566 housing units, of which 11.6% were vacant. Among occupied housing units, 46.4% were owner-occupied and 53.6% were renter-occupied. The homeowner vacancy rate was 2.6% and the rental vacancy rate was 12.8%.

=== 2000 census ===
As of the census of 2000, there were 65,660 people, 23,759 households, and 14,873 families residing in the city. The population density was 1,515.2 inhabitants per square mile (585.0/km^{2}). There were 25,703 housing units at an average density of 593.1 per square mile (229.0/km^{2}). The racial makeup of the city was 64.65% White, 17% African American, 0.40% Native American, 1.65% Asian, 0.08% Pacific Islander, 13.32% from other races, and 2.17% from two or more races. Hispanic or Latino of any ethnicity/nationality were 17.83% of the population.

There were 23,759 households, out of which 32.3% had children under the age of 18 living with them, 44.2% were married couples living together, 14.0% had a female householder with no husband present, and 37.4% were non-families. 26.1% of all households were made up of individuals, and 7.7% had someone living alone who was 65 years of age or older. The average household size was 2.65 and the average family size was 3.27.

In the city, the population was spread out, with 27.0% under the age of 18, 18.1% from 18 to 24, 29.8% from 25 to 44, 15.8% from 45 to 64, and 9.3% who were 65 years of age or older. The median age was 28 years. For every 100 females, there were 99.2 males. For every 100 females age 18 and over, there were 95.7 males.

The median income for a household in the city was $31,672, and the median income for a family was $41,433. Males had a median income of $29,780 versus $22,428 for females. The per capita income for the city was $15,770. About 15.5% of families and 22.3% of the population were below the poverty line, including 27.0% of those under age 18 and 11.7% of those age 65 or over.

== Economy ==
Largest employers
Employer	Number of employees
Texas A&M University	17,000
Bryan Independent School District	3,000
Texas A&M Health Science Center	2,000
College Station Independent School District	2,000
Blinn College	2,000
Reynolds and Reynolds	1,500
CHI St. Joseph Health	1,000
Sanderson Farms	1,000
Walmart	1,000
H-E-B	1,000

== Parks and recreation ==
Sports complexes and recreation centers include: Kyle Field, Merrill Green Stadium, Reed Arena, Olsen Field at Blue Bell Park, American Momentum Bank Ballpark, G. Rollie White Coliseum, Anderson Track and Field Complex, Aggie Soccer Complex, Bryan Regional Athletic Complex, Aggie Softball Complex, George P. Mitchell Tennis Center, Spirit Ice Arena, The City Course at Phillips Event Center, and Bryan Aquatic Center.

== Government ==
=== State ===
The Texas Department of Criminal Justice (TDCJ) operates the Hamilton Unit, a pre-release facility in Bryan. Hamilton opened as an adult prison facility. It was renovated for juveniles and, in mid-1997, re-opened as the Texas Youth Commission (TYC) J.W. Hamilton Jr. State School. On June 15, 2003, the facility was transferred back to the TDCJ. The TDCJ also operates the Bryan District Parole Office in nearby College Station.

=== Federal ===
The United States Postal Service operates the Bryan and Downtown Bryan post offices. The Federal Bureau of Prisons operates the Federal Prison Camp, Bryan, a women's prison located in Bryan.

== Education ==
=== Colleges ===
- Blinn College – Bryan Campus
- Texas A&M Health Science Center
- Texas A&M University System RELLIS Campus

=== Public schools ===
- Bryan Independent School District

=== Independent schools ===
- Allen Academy: PK–12 College Preparatory
- St. Joseph Catholic School: PK–12 College Preparatory
- St. Michaels Academy: PK–12 College Preparatory
- Brazos Christian School: PK–12 College Preparatory
- Still Creek Ranch: Private K-12 Boarding and Day School
- Arrow Academy: K-6

== Media ==
=== Publications ===
- The Bryan-College Station Eagle (main newspaper)
- La Voz Hispana (Spanish language weekly)
- The Battalion (Texas A&M)
- The Press
- The Bryan High Norseman (Travis B. Bryan High School)
- Insite Magazine (local magazine – monthly publication)
- Bryan Broadcasting Publications
- The Jail Times (Locally owned and operated independent newspaper, Bryan/College Station)

=== Radio ===
- KEOS 89.1 Community Radio For The Brazos Valley
- KAMU-FM NPR 90.9 (National Public Radio)
- KNDE 95.1 Candy 95 (Top 40)
- KORA-FM 98.3 The Texas Country Original
- KNFX-FM 99.5 The Fox (Classic Rock)
- KBXT 101.9 THE BEAT
- KVJM 103.1 La Preciosa (Regional Mexican)(Formerly V103.1 Hip Hop/Power 94)
- KVLX 103.9 K-LOVE (Contemporary Christian)
- KKYS Mix 104.7 (Hot A/C)
- KPWJ 107.7 Peace
- KZNE 1150 The Zone (ESPN Sports Radio)
- WTAW 1620 (Talk Radio)

=== Television ===
- KBTX-TV 3 (CBS, with CW on DT2)
- KAMU-TV 12 (PBS)
- KAGS-LD 23 (NBC) – A semi-satellite of KCEN-TV in Temple
- KYLE-TV 28 (MNTV, with Fox [via KWKT-TV in Waco] on DT2)
- KRHD-CD 40 (ABC) – A satellite of KXXV in Waco (branded as 15ABC)

== Infrastructure ==
=== Transportation ===
The Brazos Transit District began offering bus service in the Bryan-College Station area in 1974. It offers fixed bus routes throughout Bryan-College Station. Operating on weekdays on an hourly basis, the seven routes converge at a central location for transferring between routes. It also offers paratransit services for disabled riders and an on-demand shared ride service. Texas A&M University, headquartered in sister city College Station, operates student-driven free buses on weekdays for use by the general public that includes coverage around several apartment complexes in Bryan near campus and along a route that culminates at the campus of Blinn College.

=== Airports ===
Bryan is served commercially by Easterwood Airport, a regional airport operated by Texas A&M University in College Station. American Eagle offers flights to and from their larger hub airport at Dallas/Fort Worth International Airport.

The city of Bryan owns and operates Coulter Field and provides fixed-base operator services, hangar space, and runways for private flights.

=== Major roads ===
- U.S. Highway 190
- State Highway 6: Earl Rudder Freeway (East Loop)
- State Highway 6 Business:Texas Avenue
- State Highway 21: San Jacinto
- State Highway 47
- Farm to Market Road 60: University Drive
- Farm to Market Road 158: William J. Bryan Parkway / Boonville Road
- Farm to Market Road 974: Tabor Road
- Farm to Market Road 1179: Briarcrest Drive
- Farm to Market Road 2154: Wellborn Road
- Farm to Market Road 2818: Harvey Mitchell Parkway (West Loop)

== Notable people ==
- Lynn Aldrich, sculptor and educator
- Walter L. Buenger, historian at Texas A&M University
- Melvin Bullitt, National Football League free safety (Colts)
- Gerald Carter, NFL wide receiver (Jets/Buccaneers)
- James T. Draper, Jr., Texas Southern Baptist clergyman who began his pastorate in Bryan in 1956
- Linda Ellerbee, NBC broadcast journalist
- Bill Flores, congressman from Texas from 2011 to 2021
- Roy Bill Garcia, radio personality
- R. T. Guinn is an American professional basketball player
- Jack Kingston, congressman from First District of Georgia
- David Konderla, Roman Catholic bishop
- Devin Lemons, NFL linebacker (Redskins)
- Don McLeroy, dentist in Bryan; former member of the Texas State Board of Education known for his conservative educational philosophy
- Aries Merritt, 2012 Olympic gold medalist in 110-meter hurdles
- William T. "Bill" Moore, state senator from 1949 to 1981, known as "the Bull of the Brazos" once referred to as "the father of the modern Texas A&M University"
- Steve Ogden, former member of both houses of the state legislature; a Bryan oil and gas businessman
- John N. Raney, member of the Texas House of Representatives from Brazos County since 2011; reared in Bryan, businessman and resident of College Station
- Raini Rodriguez, actress and singer who appeared in Paul Blart: Mall Cop and the Disney channel's Austin & Ally
- Rico Rodriguez, young actor known best for his role in the ABC sitcom Modern Family
- Christopher Sharpless, bobsledder
- Shawn Slocum, special teams coordinator of the Green Bay Packers
- Syndric Steptoe, NFL wide receiver (Browns)
- Doug Supernaw, country music artist
- Ty Warren, NFL defensive end (Patriots)
- Charles F. Widdecke, decorated Major general of the Marine Corps

== See also ==
- College Station, Texas, neighboring sister city
