= Area code 979 =

Area code in Texas, United States

Numbering plan areas and area codes of Texas with numbering plan area 979 highlighted.

Area code 979 is a telephone area code in the North American Numbering Plan (NANP) for the U.S. state of Texas. The numbering plan area comprises the region generally following the Brazos River found between the Austin and Houston metro areas and its surrounding communities, stretching from just south of Waco to the Gulf Coast. It was created on February 13, 2000, in a split from area code 409.

== Service area ==
The counties served by area code 979 are:

Austin, Brazoria, Brazos, Burleson, Colorado, Fayette, Fort Bend, Lee, Matagorda, Milam, Robertson, Waller, Washington and Wharton.

The area includes the following cities and towns:

Alleyton, Altair, Angleton, Bay City, Beasley, Bellville, Bleiblerville, Boling, Brazoria, Brenham, Bryan, Burton, Caldwell, Calvert, Carmine, Cat Spring, Cedar Lane, Chappell Hill, Chriesman, Clute, College Station, Columbus, Damon, Danbury, Danciger, Danevang, Deanville, Dime Box, Eagle Lake, East Bernard, Egypt, El Campo, Ellinger, Fayetteville, Franklin, Freeport, Garwood, Gause, Giddings, Glen Flora, Glidden, Guy, Hearne, Hempstead, Hungerford, Industry, Kendleton, Kenney, Kurten, La Grange, Lake Jackson, Lane City, Ledbetter, Lexington, Lincoln, Lissie, Louise, Lyons, Markham, Matagorda, Millican, Mumford, Nada, Navasota, Needville, New Baden, New Ulm, Oakland, Old Ocean, Orchard, Pierce, Pledger, Plum, Prairie Hill, Pine Island, Rock Island, Round Top, San Felipe, Schulenburg, Sealy, Sheridan, Somerville, Sweeny, Van Vleck, Wadsworth, Wallis, Warda, Warrenton, Weimar, Wellborn, West Columbia, West Point, Wharton, and Wheelock.

== See also ==
- List of Texas area codes

Texas area codes: 210/726, 214/469/972/945, 254, 325, 361, 409, 432, 512/737, 713/281/832/346, 806, 817/682, 830, 903/430, 915, 936, 940, 956, 979
	North: 254, 430/903	
West: 512/737, 361	area code 979	East: 281/346/621/713/832, 409, 936
	South: Gulf of Mexico	
