= National Register of Historic Places listings in Burleson County, Texas =

Location of Burleson County in Texas

This is a list of the National Register of Historic Places listings in Burleson County, Texas.

This is intended to be a complete list of properties listed on the National Register of Historic Places in Burleson County, Texas. There are 3 properties listed on the National Register in the county. Both properties are also designated as Recorded Texas Historic Landmarks.

This National Park Service list is complete through NPS recent listings posted November 21, 2025.

== Current listings ==
The locations of National Register properties may be seen in a mapping service provided.

	Name on the Register	Image	Date listed	Location	City or town	Description
1	Ethiopian Star Lodge #308		November 26, 2025 (#100012167)	211 County Road 267; 30°30′13″N 96°28′10″W	Snook vicinity	
2	Thomas and Mary Kraitchar Jr. House	Thomas and Mary Kraitchar Jr. House	July 11, 2002 (#02000731)	200 E. Buck St. 30°31′58″N 96°41′29″W	Caldwell	Recorded Texas Historic Landmark
3	Reeves-Womack House	Reeves-Womack House	February 4, 1993 (#93000002)	405 W. Fox St. 30°31′48″N 96°41′46″W	Caldwell	Recorded Texas Historic Landmark

== See also ==
- National Register of Historic Places listings in Texas
- Recorded Texas Historic Landmarks in Burleson County
