= Hix, Texas =

- Unincorporated community
- Location within Texas Location within the United States
- Coordinates: 30°41′53″N 96°39′44″W
- Country: United States
- State: Texas
- County: Burleson
- Elevation: 400 ft (120 m)
- Time zone: UTC-6 (Central (CST))
  - Summer (DST): UTC-5 (CDT)
- Area code: 979
- GNIS feature ID: 1379938

Hix is an unincorporated community in Burleson County, Texas, United States. According to the Handbook of Texas, the community had a population of 35 in 2000. It is located within the Bryan-College Station metropolitan area.

== Geography ==
Hix is located on Farm to Market Road 2000 on the west bank of the Brazos River, 11 mi (18 km) northeast of Caldwell in far northeastern Burleson County.

== Education ==
Hix had its own school in the late-1800s. The community is served by the Caldwell Independent School District.
