= Clay, Texas =

- Census-designated place
- Location within Texas Location within the United States
- Coordinates: 30°22′52″N 96°20′41″W
- Country: United States
- State: Texas
- County: Burleson

Area
  - Total: 4.47 sq mi (11.6 km^{2})
  - Land: 4.45 sq mi (11.5 km^{2})
  - Water: 0.02 sq mi (0.052 km^{2})
- Elevation: 207 ft (63 m)

Population (2020)
  - Total: 139
- Time zone: UTC-6 (Central (CST))
  - Summer (DST): UTC-5 (CDT)
- ZIP Code: 77879 (Somerville)
- Area code: 979
- FIPS code: 48-15232
- GNIS feature ID: 2805746

Clay is an unincorporated community and census-designated place (CDP) in Burleson County, Texas, United States. It was first listed as a CDP prior to the 2020 census and has a population of 139.

The community is located along Farm to Market Road 50 (FM 50) in southeastern Burleson County, approximately 8 miles (13 km) southeast of Snook, 5 miles (8 km) north of Independence, and 17 miles (27 km) miles north of Brenham.

The Snook Independent School District has served Clay since 1949.

== Demographics ==
Historical population
Census	Pop.	Note	%±
2020	139		—
U.S. Decennial Census; 1850–1900 1910; 1920 1930 1940; 1950 1960 1970; 1980 1990 2000; 2010 2020

Clay first appeared as a census designated place in the 2020 U.S. census.

=== 2020 census ===
Clay CDP, Texas – Racial and ethnic composition Note: the US Census treats Hispanic/Latino as an ethnic category. This table excludes Latinos from the racial categories and assigns them to a separate category. Hispanics/Latinos may be of any race.
Race / Ethnicity (NH = Non-Hispanic)	Pop 2020	% 2020
White alone (NH)	2	1.44%
Black or African American alone (NH)	105	75.54%
Native American or Alaska Native alone (NH)	0	0.00%
Asian alone (NH)	1	0.72%
Native Hawaiian or Pacific Islander alone (NH)	0	0.00%
Other race alone (NH)	0	0.00%
Mixed race or Multiracial (NH)	2	1.44%
Hispanic or Latino (any race)	29	20.86%
Total	139	100.00%
