= Caldwell High School (Caldwell, Texas) =

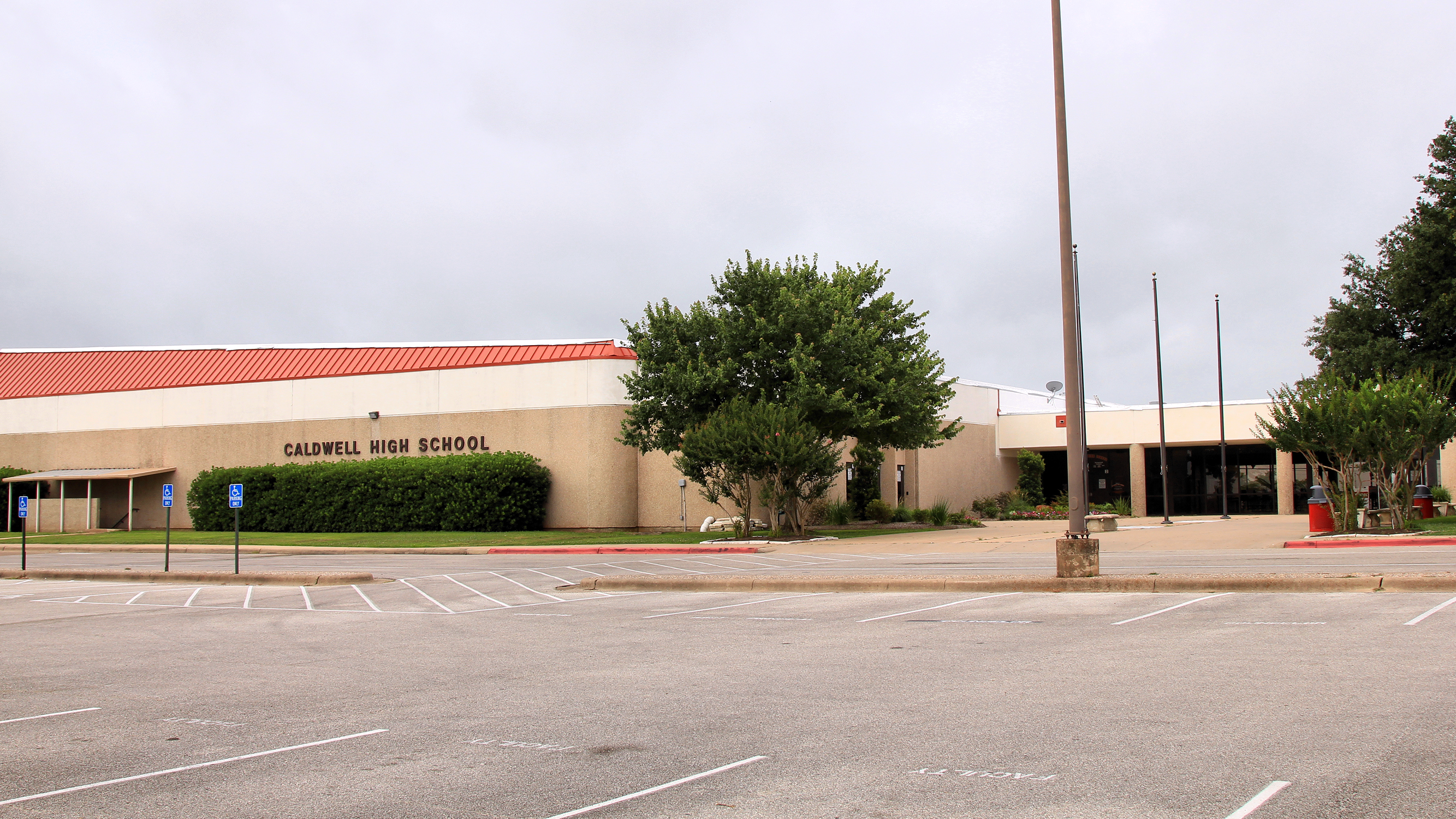

Location
- 550 County Road 307; Caldwell, Texas 77836; United States; 30°32′53.9″N 96°40′24.2″W

Information
- Type: Public School
- Motto: "Empower. Uplift. Inspire."
- School district: Caldwell Independent School District
- Principal: Vicki Ochs
- Staff: 48.26 (FTE)
- Grades: 9-12
- Enrollment: 592 (2023–2024)
- Student to teacher ratio: 12.27
- Colors: Burnt orange and white
- Athletics: Football Tennis Golf Basketball Track Power Lifting Baseball Softball
- Athletics conference: UIL Class AAAA
- Mascot: Hornets
- Yearbook: Hornet
- Website: Caldwell High School

Caldwell High School is a public high school located in the city of Caldwell, Texas (USA) and classified as a 4A school by the UIL. It is a part of the Caldwell Independent School District located in central Burleson County. Caldwell High School serves students in northern and western Burleson County, Texas.

== Academics ==
=== Texas Education Agency Accountability Ratings ===
For the 2024-2025 school year, the school was given a "B" by the Texas Education Agency.

For the 2021-2022 school year, the school was given a "B" by the Texas Education Agency, with distinctions for Academic Achievement in Mathematics and Top 25% Comparative Academic Growth.

In 2015, Caldwell High School received a Texas Education Agency accountability rating of "Met Standard," and was awarded distinctions in the areas of Reading/ELA (English Language Arts), Mathematics, Science, and Post-Secondary Readiness.

In 2014, Caldwell High School received a Texas Education Agency accountability rating of "Met Standard," and was awarded distinctions in the areas of Reading/ELA, Mathematics, and Social Studies.

== Athletics ==
The Caldwell Hornets compete in these sports -

- Baseball
- Basketball
- Cross Country
- Football
- Golf
- Powerlifting
- Softball
- Tennis
- Track and Field
- Volleyball

=== State titles ===
- Boys Track -
  - 1970(2A)
- Volleyball -
  - 1985(1A), 1998(3A), 2000(3A)

== Fine Arts ==
=== State titles ===
- One Act Play -
  - 1980(2A), 1984(3A)

== Notable alumni ==
- Kent Caperton, Texas State Senator
- Jason Carter, American football player, Carolina Panthers
- Charlie Krueger, American football player, San Francisco 49ers
- John Symank, American football player, Green Bay Packers and St. Louis Cardinals
- Kris Kocurek, American football player, coach Detroit Lions
- Mel Deutsch, American baseball player, Boston Red Sox
