= Frenstat, Texas =

- Unincorporated community
- Nickname: Friendsted
- Location within Texas Location within the United States
- Coordinates: 30°23′51″N 96°39′12″W
- Country: United States
- State: Texas
- County: Burleson
- Elevation: 381 ft (116 m)
- Time zone: UTC-6 (Central (CST))
  - Summer (DST): UTC-5 (CDT)
- ZIP Code: 77879
- Area code: 979
- GNIS feature ID: 1379801

Frenstat is an unincorporated community in Burleson County, Texas, United States. It is located within the Bryan-College Station metropolitan area.

== Geography ==
Frenstat is situated 15 miles north of Burton, nine miles south of the county seat, Caldwell, 17 miles south of Carmine, and 25 miles southwest from College Station. It is on Farm to Market Road 2774 on Big Creek, 7 mi (11 km) northwest of Somerville.

== History ==
The area around Frenstat was first settled in the mid-1830s. The community was founded in 1884 by Catholic Czech immigrants from Moravia. The town was named Frenstat, after Frenštát pod Radhoštěm, an area which many of the settlers emigrated from. There were about 40 Czech families in the area in 1886, some of which had moved there from Caldwell. A post office existed between 1891 and 1908, and a general store and cotton gin was located in the town in the late 1800s. In 1889, settlers constructed the Holy Rosary Catholic Church, which still stands today. It is on land erected by Adolph Polansky and is the first Catholic Church in the county. Population estimates in 1892 and the 1940s reported that the population was 25. There were an estimated 85 Czech families in the area in 1931. By the late 1900s, only a few farms, a recreation center, and a church comprised the community.

== Education ==
Frenstat's first school was erected on land donated by Polansky between 1886 and 1889. It became a part of Somerville ISD in 1948. Public education for Frenstat is provided by Somerville Independent School District.
