= Kris Kocurek =

American football player and coach (born 1978)

San Francisco 49ers
- Title: Defensive line coach

Personal information
- Born: November 15, 1978 (age 47); Deanville, Texas, U.S.
- Listed height: 6 ft 4 in (1.93 m)
- Listed weight: 293 lb (133 kg)

Career information
- Position: Defensive tackle (No. 99)
- High school: Caldwell (Caldwell, Texas)
- College: Texas Tech (1997–2000)
- NFL draft: 2001: 7th round, 237th overall pick

Career history

Playing
- Seattle Seahawks (2001)*; Tennessee Titans (2001–2002)
- * Offseason or practice squad member only

Coaching
- Texas Tech (2003) Graduate assistant; Texas A&M-Kingsville (2004–2005) Graduate assistant; Texas A&M-Commerce (2006) Defensive line coach; West Texas A&M (2007) Defensive line coach; Stephen F. Austin State (2008) Defensive line coach; Detroit Lions (2009) Assistant defensive line coach; Detroit Lions (2010–2017) Defensive line coach; Miami Dolphins (2018) Defensive line coach; San Francisco 49ers (2019–present) Defensive line coach

Awards and highlights
- Second-team All-Big 12 (2000)
- Stats at Pro Football Reference

Kris Kocurek (/kuːsɛrɛk/ born November 15, 1978) is an American professional football coach and former defensive tackle who is the defensive line coach for the San Francisco 49ers of the National Football League (NFL). He previously served as an assistant coach for the Miami Dolphins and Detroit Lions. Kocurek played college football for the Texas Tech Red Raiders and was selected by the Seattle Seahawks in the seventh round of the 2001 NFL draft. Kocurek was also a member of the Tennessee Titans.

== Playing career ==
Pre-draft measurables
Height	Weight
6 ft 4 1/4 in (1.94 m)	293 lb (133 kg)
Values from Pro Day

=== Seattle Seahawks ===
Kocurek was selected by the Seattle Seahawks in the seventh round, with the 237th overall pick, of the 2001 NFL draft. He officially signed with the team on June 11. He was waived on September 2, 2001.

=== Tennessee Titans ===
Kocurek was signed to the practice squad of the Tennessee Titans on October 25, 2001. He was promoted to the active roster on December 20 and played in one game for the Titans during the 2001 season. He was placed on injured reserve on August 25, 2002, and did not appear in any games during the 2002 season. Kocurek became a free agent in February 2003.

== Coaching career ==
=== Texas Tech ===
In 2003, Kocurek began his coaching career at Texas Tech as a graduate assistant.

=== Texas A&M–Kingsville ===
In 2004, Kocurek was hired as a graduate assistant at Texas A&M–Kingsville.

=== Texas A&M–Commerce ===
In 2006, Kocurek was hired as a defensive line coach at Texas A&M–Commerce.

=== West Texas A&M ===
In 2007, Kocurek was hired as a defensive line and assistant head coach at West Texas A&M.

=== Stephen F. Austin State ===
In 2008, Kocurek was hired as a defensive line coach at Stephen F. Austin State.

=== Detroit Lions ===
In 2009, Kocurek was hired by the Detroit Lions as an assistant defensive line coach. In 2010, he was promoted to defensive line coach after the retirement of Bob Karmelowicz.

=== Miami Dolphins ===
On January 17, 2018, Kocurek was hired by the Miami Dolphins as their defensive line coach.

=== San Francisco 49ers ===
On January 15, 2019, Kocurek was hired by the San Francisco 49ers as their defensive line coach.
