= Chriesman, Texas =

- Unincorporated community
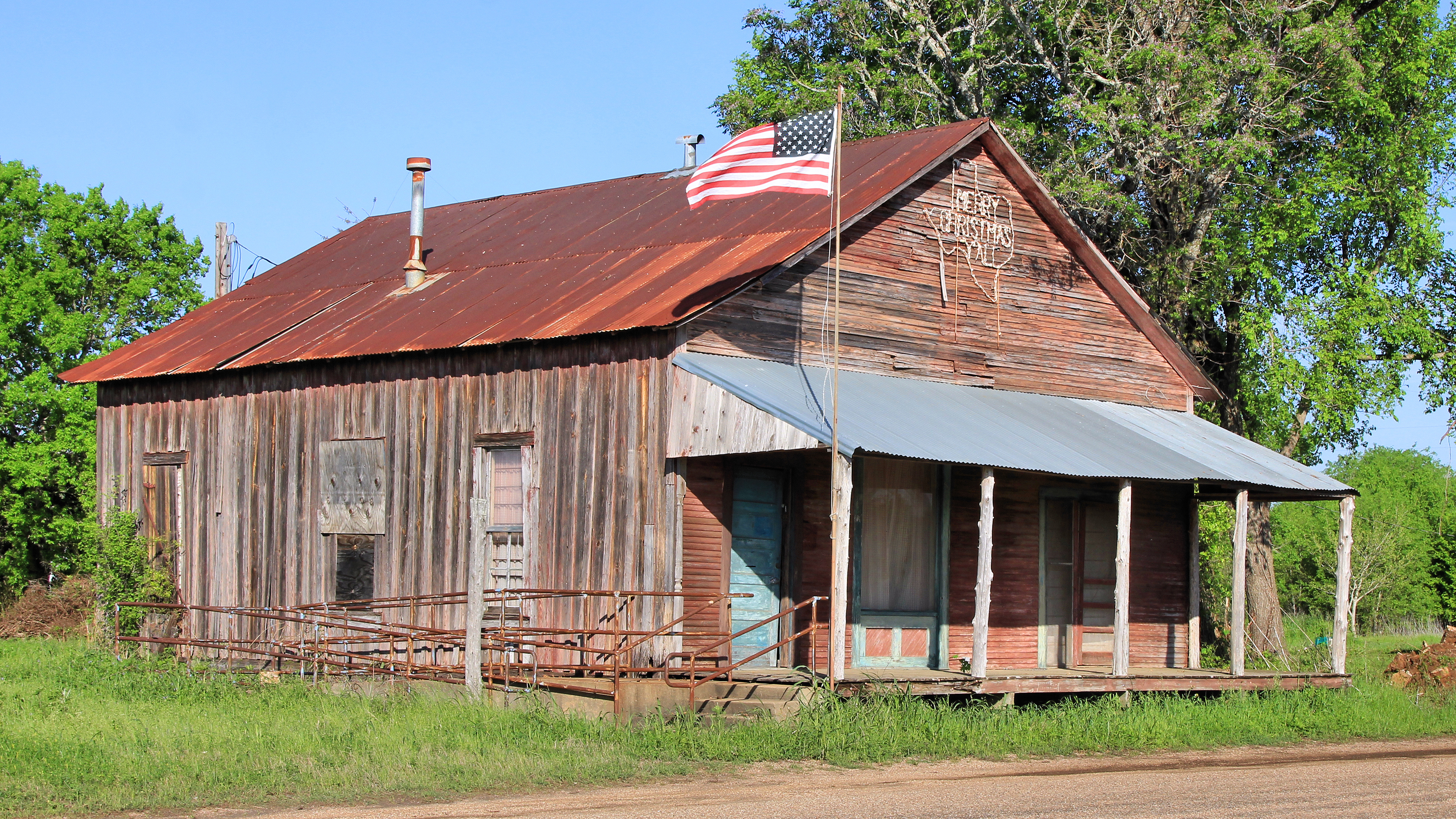
- Old Post Office Building

- Location within Texas Location within the United States
- Coordinates: 30°35′58″N 96°46′15″W
- Country: United States
- State: Texas
- County: Burleson
- Elevation: 446 ft (136 m)
- Time zone: UTC-6 (Central (CST))
  - Summer (DST): UTC-5 (CDT)
- ZIP Code: 77838
- Area code: 979
- GNIS feature ID: 1354467

Chriesman (/ˈkrɪsmən/ KRISS-mən) is an unincorporated community in Burleson County, Texas, United States. The population was 30 in 2000. It is located within the Bryan-College Station metropolitan area.

== History ==
The community was named in honor of Horatio Chriesman (1797–1878), a surveyor and early settler from Virginia who moved to Texas as a member of the Old Three Hundred. Alexander Thomson Jr., brought the first settlers to this area in the 1830s. They named it Yellow Prairie for the tall, yellow grass in the prairie. It became a stop on the Gulf, Colorado and Santa Fe Railway after a track was built in 1880 and went by Yellow Prairie until the early 20th century. A post office was established here in 1880 and was named Yellow Prairie in 1884. The next year, it was renamed Chriesman. The community had 100 residents, a gristmill, a cotton gin, and churches for the Methodist and Presbyterian congregations. A cucumber salting station was built by the San Antonio-based Price-Booker Manufacturing Company in 1904. Ten years later, Chriesman had telephone service, a bank, four general stores, a cotton gin, and 175 residents. The population grew to 200 in 1925, lost half in 1930, and was reduced by half again in 1950. There were eight businesses in Chriesman when the cucumber plant closed in 1930. The population stopped at 30 from 1972 through 2000. There were two churches, several scattered houses, and a cemetery in 1988.

== Geography ==
Chriesman is located just west of Texas State Highway 36 on the BNSF Railway, 7 mi (11 km) northwest of Caldwell in northwestern Burleson County.

== Education ==
Chriesman had its own school in 1890. The community is served by the Caldwell Independent School District.
