= Bryan–College Station =

Coordinates: 30°38′00″N 96°20′26″W

- Metropolitan statistical area
- College Station–Bryan, TX Metropolitan Statistical Area
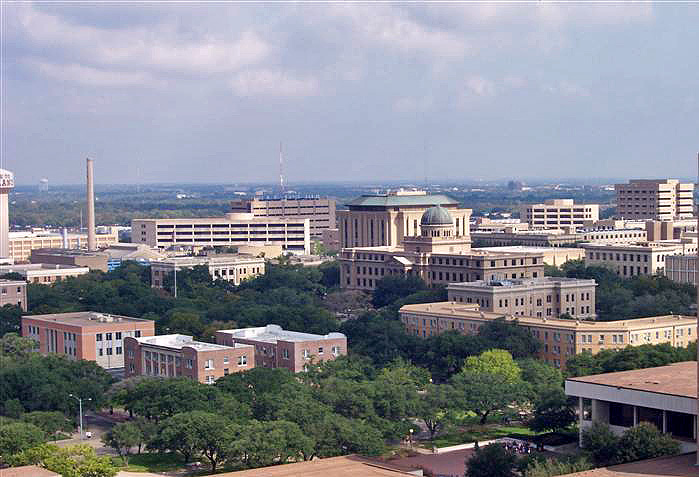
- Texas A&M University
- Nickname: Aggieland
Interactive Map of College Station–Bryan, TX MSA
City of College Station
City of Bryan
College Station–Bryan, TX MSA
- Country: United States
- State: Texas
- Principal cities: College Station; Bryan

Area
  - Urban: 71.4 sq mi (185 km^{2})

Population (2020)
  - Urban: 206,137 (184th)
  - Urban density: 2,399/sq mi (926/km^{2})
  - MSA: 287,462(176th)

GDP
  - Total: $18.181 billion (2022)
- Time zone: UTC-6 (CST)
  - Summer (DST): UTC-5 (CDT)

Bryan–College Station is a metropolitan area centering on the twin cities of Bryan and College Station, Texas, in the Brazos Valley region of Texas. The 2020 census placed the population of the three-county metropolitan area at 268,248, increasing to an estimated 287,476 by 2025.

The area's economic and social life is centered on the main campus of Texas A&M University College Station. The area is popularly known as "Aggieland" based on the Aggies nickname for the university's sports teams and students.

== Geography ==
The College Station–Bryan, TX metropolitan statistical area (MSA) encompasses three counties: Brazos, Burleson, and Robertson. The College Station–Bryan MSA encompasses 2,123 sq mi (5,524 km2) of area, of which 2,100 sq mi (5,439 km2) is land and 33.5 sq mi (87 km2) is water.

== Counties ==
- Brazos
- Burleson
- Robertson

== Communities ==
=== Places with more than 75,000 people ===
- College Station
- Bryan

=== Places with 1,000 to 10,000 people ===
- Caldwell
- Calvert
- Franklin
- Hearne
- Somerville
- Navasota (extremely small portion; primarily in Grimes County)

=== Places with fewer than 1,000 people ===
- Anderson
- Bremond
- Snook
- Kurten
- Millican
- Todd Mission
- Wixon Valley
- Iola
- Bedias

=== Unincorporated places ===
- Benchley
- Chriesman
- Cooks Point
- Deanville
- Easterly
- Frenstat
- Hammond
- Lyons
- Mumford
- New Baden
- Ridge
- Tidwell Prairie
- Wheelock

== Demographics ==
Historical populations
Census	Pop.	Note	%±
1960	44,895		—
1970	57,978		29.1%
1980	93,588		61.4%
1990	121,862		30.2%
2000	184,885		51.7%
2010	228,660		23.7%
2020	268,248		17.3%

As of the census of 2020, there were 268,248 people, 95,194 households, and 55,487 families residing within the MSA. The racial makeup of the MSA was 60.71% White (non-Hispanic White 53.61%), 10.63% African American, 0.69% Native American, 5.52% Asian, 0.09% Pacific Islander, 9.84% from other races, and 3.33% from two or more races. Hispanic or Latino residents of any race were 26.21% of the population.

The median income for a household in the MSA was $30,339 and the median income for a family was $40,442. Males had a median income of $30,818 versus $21,951 for females. The per capita income for the MSA was $15,847.

County	Seat	2025 estimate	2020 Census	Change	Area	Density
Brazos	Bryan	249,088	233,849	+6.52%	591 sq mi (1,531 km^{2})	421/sq mi (163/km^{2})
Burleson	Caldwell	20,549	17,642	+16.48%	677 sq mi (1,753 km^{2})	30/sq mi (12/km^{2})
Robertson	Franklin	17,839	16,757	+6.46%	865 sq mi (2,240 km^{2})	21/sq mi (8/km^{2})
Total		287,476	268,248	+7.17%	2,133 sq mi (5,520 km^{2})	135/sq mi (52/km^{2})

== See also ==
- List of cities in Texas
- Texas census statistical areas
- List of Texas metropolitan areas
- Brazos Valley, the geographic region of Texas in which the area is located
- Texas Triangle
