= Valley Council =

Valley Council may refer to:

- Brazos Valley Council of Governments, a voluntary association of cities, counties and special districts in the Brazos Valley region of Central Texas
- Lower Rio Grande Valley Development Council, a voluntary association of cities, counties and special districts in the Rio Grande Valley region of southern Texas
- Valley Council, an individual local government in Australia
- Valley Council (Wisconsin)

== See also ==
- Valley Regional Council
