= Rita, Texas =

- Unincorporated community
- Location within Texas Location within the United States
- Coordinates: 30°41′13″N 96°36′32″W
- Country: United States
- State: Texas
- County: Burleson
- Elevation: 299 ft (91 m)
- Time zone: UTC-6 (Central (CST))
  - Summer (DST): UTC-5 (CDT)
- Area code: 979
- GNIS feature ID: 1380441

Rita is an unincorporated community in Burleson County, Texas, United States. According to the Handbook of Texas, the community had a population of 50 in 2000. It is located within the Bryan-College Station metropolitan area.

== History ==
Established in the late nineteenth century on Teal Prairie, two miles west of then-abandoned Fort Tenoxtitlan, Rita was formed after the United States government gave land to Army of the Republic of Texas veteran John Teal. From 1894 to 1905, Rita had a post office. During World War II it had a Red Cross chapter.

Historical population
Year	Pop.	±%
1939	20	—
1968	68	+240.0%
2000	68	+0.0%

== Geography ==
Rita is located in the Texas Blackland Prairies, on the south bank of Dam Creek and about two miles west of the Brazos River.

== Education ==
Today, Rita is served by the Caldwell Independent School District.
