= Snook Middle & High School =

Location
- 10110 FM 2155; Snook, Texas 77878-0087; United States; 30.490693°N 96.467522°W

Information
- School type: Public high school
- School district: Snook Independent School District
- Principal: Darren Nobles
- Teaching staff: 30.04 (on an FTE basis)
- Grades: 6-12
- Enrollment: 301 (2023–24)
- Student to teacher ratio: 10.02
- Colors: Royal Blue & White
- Athletics conference: UIL Class 2A
- Mascot: Bluejay
- Website: Snook ISD

Snook Middle & High School or Snook Secondary School is a 2A public high school located in Snook, Texas (USA). It is part of the Snook Independent School District located in southeastern Burleson County. For the 2024-2025 school year, the school was given a "B" by the Texas Education Agency.

== Athletics ==
The Snook Bluejays compete in the following sports:

- Baseball
- Basketball
- Cross Country
- Football
- Golf
- Powerlifting
- Softball
- Tennis
- Track and Field
- Volleyball

=== State Titles ===
- Boys Basketball -
  - 1965(B), 1966(B), 1969(B), 1978(1A), 1979(B), 1980(B), 1981(1A), 1982(1A), 1983(1A), 1984(1A),
- Girls Basketball -
  - 1986(1A)
- Boys Cross Country -
  - 2000(1A)
- Boys Track -
  - 1979(B),1980(B), 1981(1A), 1982(1A)

==== State Finalists ====
- Boys Basketball –
  - 1971(B), 1972(B), 1974(1A), 2005(1A/D1)

== Notable alumni ==
- Leighton Schubert, state representative for District 13; lawyer in Caldwell, Texas
- Bruce Skrabanek, Lieutenant Colonel in the US Army, and Bronze Star recipient. Valedictorian of the class of 1990
