= Brazos Valley Council of Governments =

- Logo

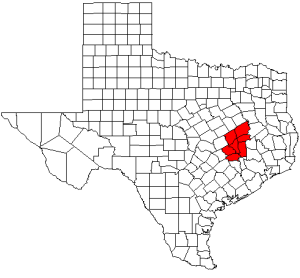
- Map of Texas highlighting counties served by the Brazos Valley Council of Governments
- Formation: November 1966
- Type: Voluntary association of governments
- Region served: 5,124 sq mi (13,270 km^{2})
- Members: 7 counties

Historical population
Year	Pop.	±%
2000	267,085	—
2010	319,447	+19.6%
2020	362,495	+13.5%

The Brazos Valley Council of Governments (BVCOG) is a voluntary association of cities, counties and special districts in the Brazos Valley region of Central Texas.

Based in Bryan, the Brazos Valley Council of Governments is a member of the Texas Association of Regional Councils.

== Counties served ==
- Brazos
- Burleson
- Grimes
- Leon
- Madison
- Robertson
- Washington

== Largest cities in the region ==
- Bryan
- College Station
- Brenham
- Navasota
- Hearne
- Madisonville
- Caldwell
