= Horatio Chriesman =

American surveyor, politician and soldier (1797–1878)

- Born: August 13, 1797; Virginia, US
- Died: November 1, 1878 (aged 81); Burleson County, Texas, US
- Occupation(s): Surveyor, politician, soldier
- Spouses: Mary Kincheloe; Augusta Hope
- Children: 11
- Relatives: William Kincheloe (father-in-law)

Horatio Chriesman (August 13, 1797 – November 1, 1878) was an American surveyor, politician and soldier.

== Early life ==
Chriesman was born on August 13, 1797, in Virginia.

== Career ==
He served as a surveyor in Kentucky and Missouri. In 1821, shortly after his wife died, he left Missouri for Texas with his father-in-law, William Kincheloe (1779–1835), aboard the schooner Only Son. They arrived on the Colorado River on June 19, 1822.

Chriesman became a member of the Old Three Hundred after Stephen F. Austin succeeded his father, Moses Austin, as empresario. Becoming the first to plot the headright Spanish grants on February 10, 1823, he continued until Stephen F. Austin's death in 1836.

He surveyed the Jack League, in what is now Fayette County, which was purchased in 1843 by the German immigration company Adelsverein as a slave plantation. It was named Nassau Plantation after the Duke of Nassau.

Chriesman fought against Native Americans as captain of the colonial militia in 1824. A few years later, in 1826 and 1827, he served in the Fredonian Rebellion, European settlers' first attempt to secede from Mexico.

He was elected as mayor of San Felipe, Texas, in 1832. Later that year, he was an attendee of the Convention of 1832.

In 1835, Chriesman lost the election as regidor of Washington-on-the-Brazos, Texas. A year later, he attended the Convention of 1836 in Washington-on-the-Brazos.

In 1836, as he was moving East towards the Trinity River, he heard about the Battle of San Jacinto and decided to serve in the Texas Revolution. As a result, he enlisted as captain in the 2nd company of the 141st Infantry Regiment.

Serving on a committee to help choose the new Republic of Texas seat of government in 1837, Chriesman proposed a site near Washington-on-the-Brazos at what is now Gay Hill in Washington County. He was willing to donate four Labors of land (approximately 700 acres) for the capital of the Republic of Texas. Austin was eventually chosen as the seat of government.

In 1840, Chriesman was one of nine trustees who incorporated the Republic's first private institution of learning, the Union Academy in Washington-on-the-Brazos.

He retired in Burleson County, Texas.

== Personal life and death ==
Chriesman married Mary Kincheloe in 1818. She died in New Madrid, Missouri, in 1821. In 1825, he married Augusta Hope. He had eleven children.

Chriesman died on November 1, 1878, in Burleson County, Texas.

== Legacy ==
- The town of Chriesman, Texas, in Burleson County is named in his honor.
- The ghost town of Gay Hill in Washington County, Texas, was known as "Chriesman Settlement" until it was renamed by the Republic of Texas in 1840.
