= Cooks Point, Texas =

Cooks Point
- Unincorporated community
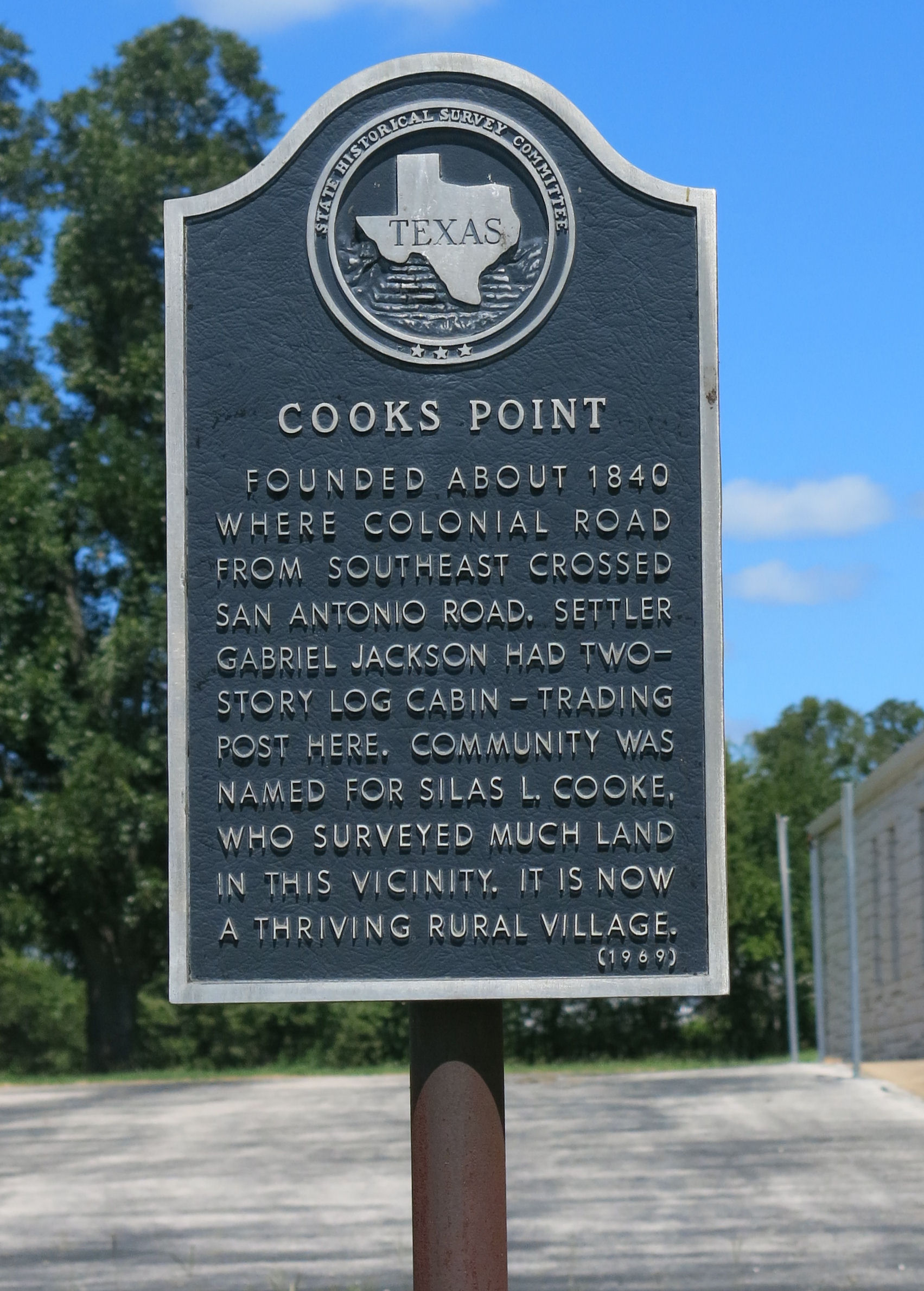

- Location within Texas Location within the United States
- Coordinates: 30°35′45″N 96°36′38″W
- Country: United States
- State: Texas
- County: Burleson
- Elevation: 341 ft (104 m)
- Time zone: UTC-6 (Central (CST))
  - Summer (DST): UTC-5 (CDT)
- Area code: 979
- GNIS feature ID: 1354907

Cooks Point is an unincorporated community in Burleson County, Texas, United States. According to the Handbook of Texas, the community had a population of 60 in 2000. It is located within the Bryan-College Station metropolitan area.

== Geography ==
Cooks Point is located on Texas State Highway 21, 8 mi (13 km) east of Caldwell in Burleson County.

== Education ==
The community continues to be served by Caldwell ISD to this day.
