= Beaver Creek, Texas =

- Census-designated place
- Location within Texas Location within the United States
- Coordinates: 30°26′57″N 96°33′43″W
- Country: United States
- State: Texas
- County: Burleson

Area
  - Total: 3.14 sq mi (8.13 km^{2})
  - Land: 3.10 sq mi (8.04 km^{2})
  - Water: 0.035 sq mi (0.09 km^{2})
- Elevation: 282 ft (86 m)

Population (2020)
  - Total: 910
- Time zone: UTC-6 (Central (CST))
  - Summer (DST): UTC-5 (CDT)
- ZIP Code: 77836 (Caldwell)
- Area code: 979
- FIPS code: 48-07042
- GNIS feature ID: 2805743

Beaver Creek is an unincorporated community and census-designated place (CDP) in Burleson County, Texas, United States. It was first listed as a CDP in the 2020 census with a population of 910.

It is southeast of the center of the county, 12 miles (19 km) southeast of Caldwell, the county seat.

== Demographics ==
Historical population
Census	Pop.	Note	%±
2020	910		—
U.S. Decennial Census; 1850–1900 1910; 1920 1930 1940; 1950 1960 1970; 1980 1990 2000; 2010 2020

Beaver Creek first appeared as a census designated place in the 2020 U.S. census.

=== 2020 census ===
Beaver Creek, Texas – Racial and ethnic composition Note: the US Census treats Hispanic/Latino as an ethnic category. This table excludes Latinos from the racial categories and assigns them to a separate category. Hispanics/Latinos may be of any race.
Race / Ethnicity (NH = Non-Hispanic)	Pop 2020	% 2020
White alone (NH)	547	60.11%
Black or African American alone (NH)	28	3.08%
Native American or Alaska Native alone (NH)	13	1.43%
Asian alone (NH)	4	0.44%
Native Hawaiian or Pacific Islander alone (NH)	0	0.00%
Other race alone (NH)	0	0.00%
Mixed race or Multiracial (NH)	62	6.81%
Hispanic or Latino (any race)	256	28.13%
Total	910	100.00%
