= Yegua Creek =

Coordinates: 30°22′51″N 96°18′00″W

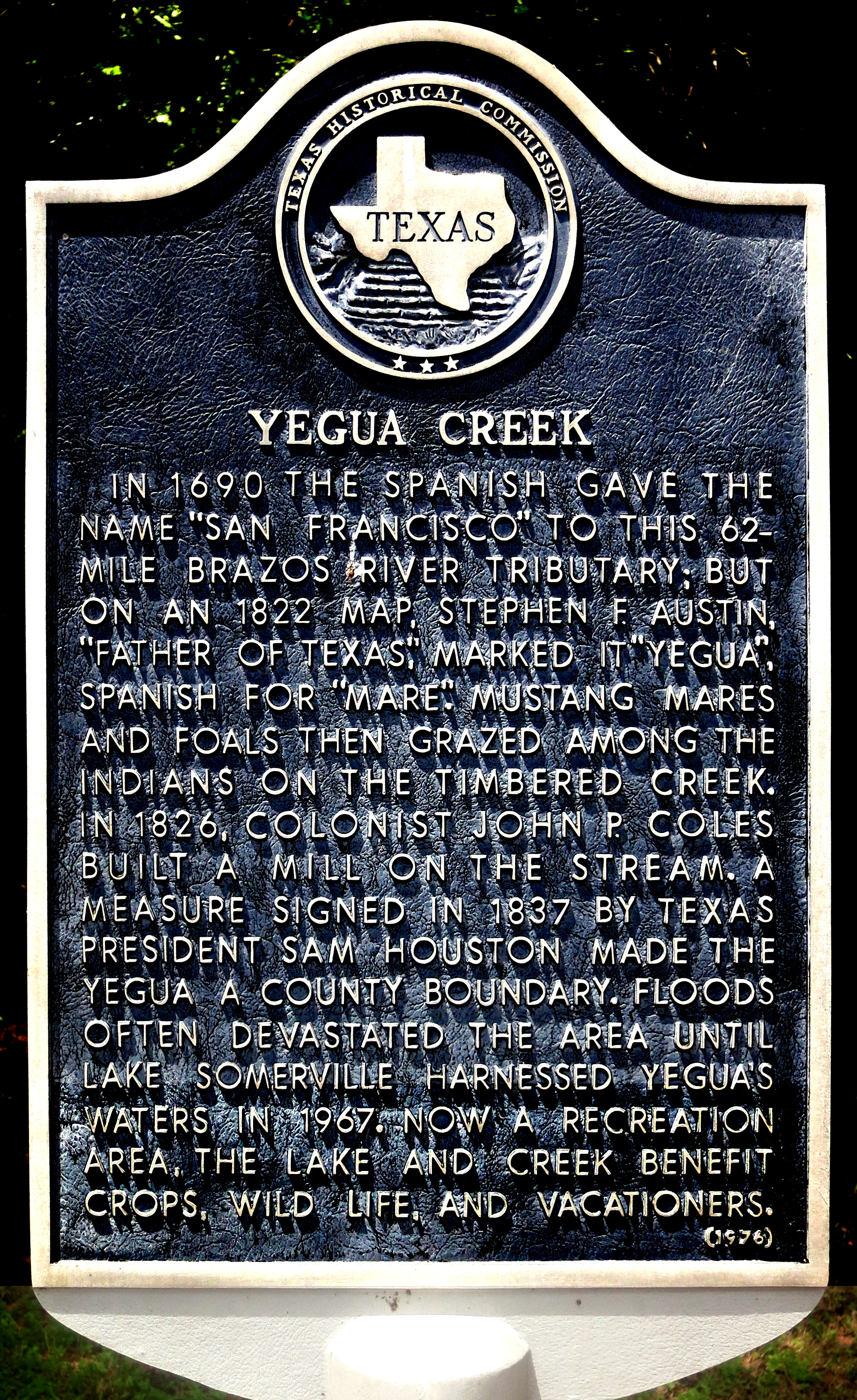
- Yegua Creek Historical Marker

Location
- Country: United States

Physical characteristics
- Source
  - location: Texas

Yegua Creek is a river in Central Texas and is part of the Brazos River drainage basin. (Yegua is the Spanish word for mare.) Yegua Creek forms in Lee County at the confluence of the Middle Yegua Creek and East Yegua Creek about three miles west of Somerville Lake. It is the primary tributary to form Somerville Lake. The Yegua flows east and becomes part of the Burleson County line for about 31 miles and then joins the Brazos River in southeastern Washington County. The Yegua below the Somerville Dam is a slow-moving, gentle river but is nevertheless used for some mild recreational canoeing and kayaking.

The Yegua, or one of its tributaries, is dammed in several places to form a series of small lakes including Wilkins, Ward, Baker, Edwards, Gerland, Draeger, Field, Mueller, C and H, Lamb, Newman, Robbins, and Butler lakes. The Yegua runs through flat terrain and supports water-tolerant hardwoods, conifers and grasses on clay loam and sandy loam soils. Since the construction of the Somerville Dam in 1967, there has been some concern about the mobility of sediment in the Yegua watershed; however, recent discoveries indicate the river has achieved a degree of equilibrium in sediment dynamics — naturally adjusting to the accumulation of 99.8% of the upper Yegua sediment being trapped by the Somerville dam.

Yegua Creek has been identified as the stream Alonso de León named the San Francisco in 1690.

== East Yegua Creek ==
East Yegua Creek forms about nine miles southwest of Rockdale, Texas in southern Milam County as a drainage in farm and ranch territory. The East Yegua is intermittent and very shallow in its upper reaches, commonly flowing with significant volume only after rainfall. It runs southeast for about 45 miles to its mouth where it joins the Middle Yegua to become the Yegua Creek at the Burleson County-Lee County line, about 15 miles south of Caldwell. The East Yegua runs through generally flat terrain with shallow depressions, clay and sandy loam soils which support water-tolerant hardwood trees, conifers and grasses.

== Alcoa Lake ==
Alcoa Lake is the result of the impoundment of Sandy Creek, seven miles southwest of Rockdale in Milam County. At the base of the dam, Sandy Creek joins the East Yegua Creek. Alcoa Lake is owned and operated by the Aluminum Company of America for industrial purposes at the site, and in recent years for recreational use. Construction of the lake was begun in February, 1952 with the dam and spillway completed in October, 1952. In 1966 the lake had a capacity of 10,500 acre-feet and surface area of 703 acres at the top of the spillway gates. The water was used by the company for condenser-cooling purposes at a steam-electric generating station. The Alcoa plant closed in 2009.

== Middle Yegua Creek ==
Middle Yegua Creek, also called Second Yegua Creek, forms five miles southeast of Coupland in southeastern Williamson County near the Lee County line. The stream is intermittent and very shallow in its upper reaches and flows southeast for 53 miles, through Williamson and Lee counties, until it joins the East Yegua Creek about five miles southeast of Dime Box, Texas in Lee County. At the confluence of the two creeks, the Yegua Creek is formed, about three miles west of Somerville Lake. The Middle Yegua has been dammed in four places to form small lakes — Round, Shaw, Little and Mourn. The banks of the Middle Yegua are wooded with post oak and other hardwoods. The creek flows through flat terrain with clay and sandy loam surface soils.

== See also ==
- List of rivers of Texas
- Yegua, Texas
