= Brazos Valley =

Valley in Texas, United States

Coordinates: 30.6600°N 96.3000°W

- Region
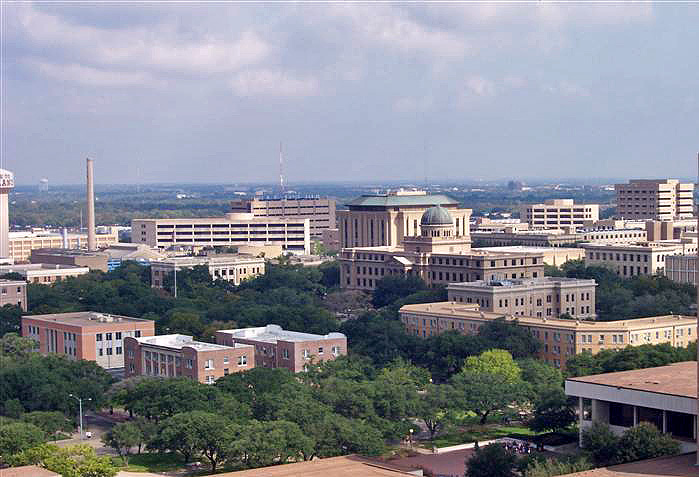
- Texas A&M University campus

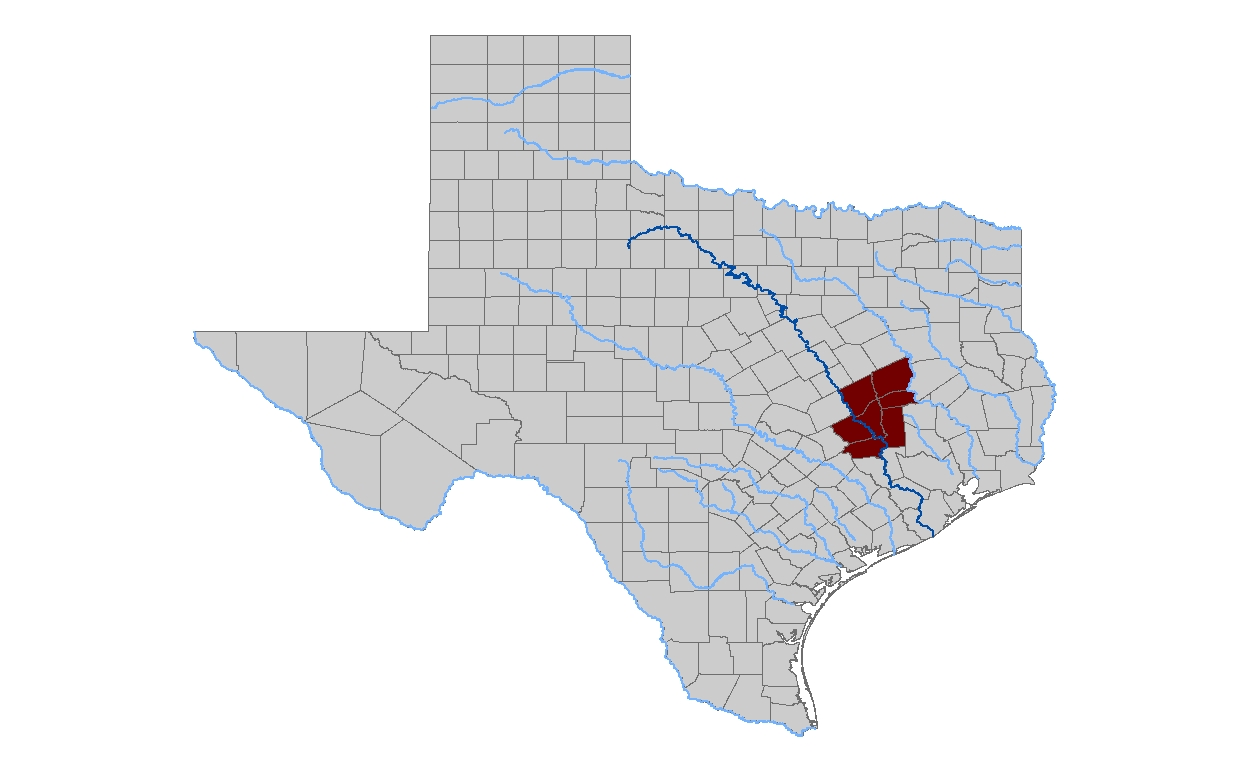
- Brazos Valley counties in red
- Country: United States
- State: Texas
- Largest city: College Station
- Counties: Brazos; Burleson; Robertson; Grimes; Leon; Madison; Washington
- Time zone: UTC-6 (CST)
  - Summer (DST): UTC-5 (CDT)
- Area codes: 936, 979

Brazos Valley (/ˈbræzəs/ BRAZ-əs) is a region of the U.S. state of Texas comprising the following 7 counties in Central Texas: Brazos, Burleson, and Robertson (which collectively comprise the Bryan–College Station metropolitan area), and the neighboring counties of Grimes, Leon, Madison, and Washington.

The area is centered on Brazos County, the cities of College Station and Bryan, and Texas A&M University. The Brazos River lies at the center of the region; however, not all areas of the region are a part of the Brazos drainage basin.

The Brazos Valley Council of Governments represents the collective interests of the local governments in the region.

The Brazos Valley Museum of Natural History maintains collections in the fields of archaeology, botany, conchology, cultural history, geology, mammalogy, ornithology, and paleontology in the region.
