= Cade Lakes, Texas =

- Census-designated place
- Location within Texas Location within the United States
- Coordinates: 30°30′24″N 96°46′15″W
- Country: United States
- State: Texas
- County: Burleson

Area
  - Total: 2.06 sq mi (5.34 km^{2})
  - Land: 1.88 sq mi (4.86 km^{2})
  - Water: 0.18 sq mi (0.47 km^{2})
- Elevation: 400 ft (120 m)

Population (2020)
  - Total: 507
- Time zone: UTC-6 (Central (CST))
  - Summer (DST): UTC-5 (CDT)
- ZIP Code: 77836 (Caldwell)
- Area code: 979
- FIPS code: 48-11725
- GNIS feature ID: 2805745

Cade Lakes is an unincorporated community and census-designated place (CDP) in Burleson County, Texas, United States. It was first listed as a CDP in the 2020 census with a population of 507.

== Geography ==
The community is in the western part of the county, built around three small reservoirs on Second Davidson Creek, an east-flowing tributary of Davidson Creek and part of the Brazos River watershed. The community is 7 miles (11 km) west of Caldwell, the county seat.

== Demographics ==
Historical population
Census	Pop.	Note	%±
2020	507		—
U.S. Decennial Census; 1850–1900 1910; 1920 1930 1940; 1950 1960 1970; 1980 1990 2000; 2010 2020

Cade Lakes first appeared as a census designated place in the 2020 U.S. census.

=== 2020 census ===
Cade Lakes CDP, Texas – Racial and ethnic composition Note: the US Census treats Hispanic/Latino as an ethnic category. This table excludes Latinos from the racial categories and assigns them to a separate category. Hispanics/Latinos may be of any race.
Race / Ethnicity (NH = Non-Hispanic)	Pop 2020	% 2020
White alone (NH)	322	63.51%
Black or African American alone (NH)	5	0.99%
Native American or Alaska Native alone (NH)	3	0.59%
Asian alone (NH)	0	0.00%
Native Hawaiian or Pacific Islander alone (NH)	2	0.44%
Other race alone (NH)	0	0.00%
Mixed race or Multiracial (NH)	17	3.35%
Hispanic or Latino (any race)	160	31.56%
Total	507	100.00%
