= Somerville Lake =

Lake of the United States of America

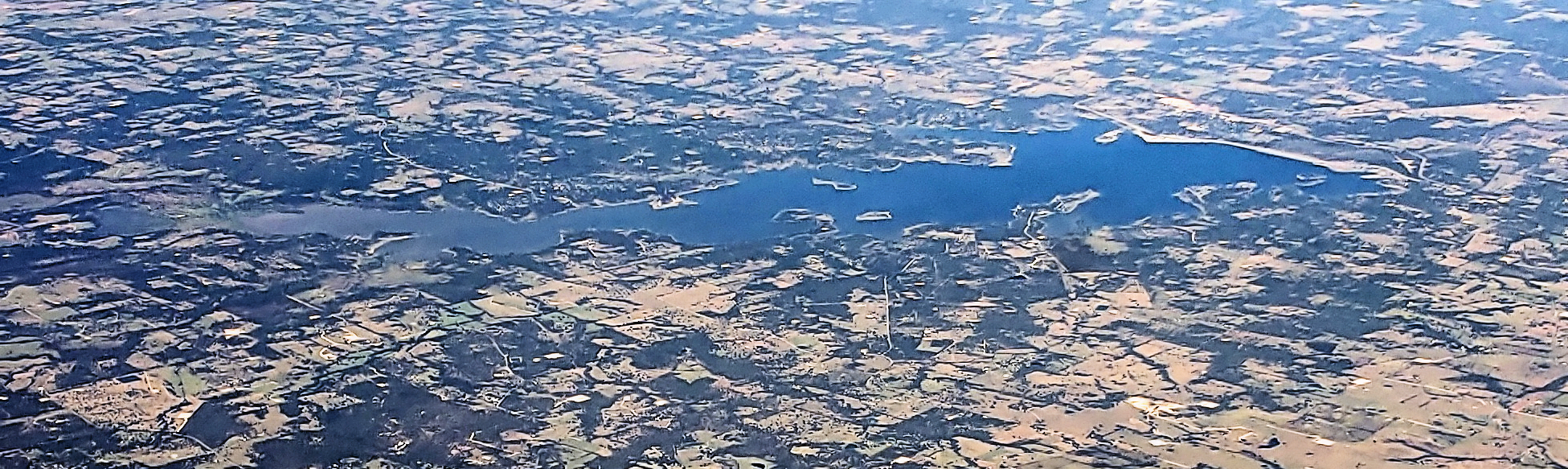

- Location within Texas Location within the United States
- Location: Burleson / Washington / Lee counties, northwest of Brenham, Texas
- Coordinates: 30°19′32″N 96°31′39″W
- Type: Flood control reservoir
- Primary inflows: Yegua Creek
- Primary outflows: Yegua Creek
- Basin countries: United States
- Surface area: 11,456 acres (4,636 ha)
- Max. depth: 38 ft (12 m)
- Water volume: 160,100 acre⋅ft (0.1975 km^{3})
- Shore length^{1}: 85 mi (139 km)
- Surface elevation: 238 ft (73 m)
- ^{1} Shore length is not a well-defined measure.

Somerville Lake is a U.S. Army Corps of Engineers reservoir on Yegua Creek in the Brazos River basin, 10 miles (16 km) northwest of Brenham, Texas, United States. The town of Somerville in Burleson County is adjacent to the reservoir. The lake extends into portions of Burleson County, Washington County, and Lee County. The dam lies in Washington County. The dam and lake are managed by the Fort Worth District of the U.S. Army Corps of Engineers. The reservoir was officially impounded in 1967, and serves to provide flood control and water for irrigation for the communities downstream. Somerville Lake is a popular recreational destination.

Somerville Lake is also commonly known as Lake Somerville.

== Fish populations ==
Somerville Lake has been stocked with species of fish intended to improve the utility of the reservoir for recreational fishing. Fish present in Somerville Lake include largemouth bass, hybrid striped bass, white bass, bluegill, catfish, white crappie, and black crappie. The reservoir is surrounded by prairie and rolling grasslands dotted with mixed hardwood forests. There is some standing timber in the upper end of the reservoir.

== Recreational uses ==
In addition to maintaining the dam that creates the reservoir, the U.S. Army Corps of Engineers maintains recreational facilities at the lake. Rocky Creek Park and Yegua Creek Park are developed US Army Corps of Engineers parks. Pecan Lake Park and McCain Park are undeveloped US Army Corps of Engineers parks. Boating and fishing are very popular. Lake Somerville State Park and Trailway is a Texas state park at the lake.
