= Jordan Valley Regional Council =

Jordan Valley Regional Council may refer to:

- Emek HaYarden Regional Council, Israeli Regional council in the northern Jordan River Valley
- Bik'at HaYarden Regional Council, Israeli regional council in the southern Jordan River Valley

== See also ==
- Valley Regional Council (disambiguation)
