= Tunis, Texas =

- Census-designated place
- Interactive map of Tunis, Texas
- Coordinates: 30°32′41″N 96°31′38″W
- Country: United States
- State: Texas
- County: Burleson
- Elevation: 272 ft (83 m)

Population (2020)
  - Total: 90
- Time zone: UTC-6 (Central (CST))
  - Summer (DST): UTC-5
- ZIP code: 77836
- Area code: 979
- GNIS feature ID: 2805749

Tunis is an unincorporated community and census-designated place in Burleson County, Texas, United States. It was first listed as a CDP in the 2020 census with a population of 90.

== Demographics ==
Historical population
Census	Pop.	Note	%±
2020	90		—
U.S. Decennial Census; 1850–1900 1910; 1920 1930 1940; 1950 1960 1970; 1980 1990 2000; 2010 2020

Tunis first appeared as a census designated place in the 2020 U.S. census.

=== 2020 Census ===
Tunis CDP, Texas – Racial and ethnic composition Note: the US Census treats Hispanic/Latino as an ethnic category. This table excludes Latinos from the racial categories and assigns them to a separate category. Hispanics/Latinos may be of any race.
Race / Ethnicity (NH = Non-Hispanic)	Pop 2020	% 2020
White alone (NH)	5	5.56%
Black or African American alone (NH)	71	78.89%
Native American or Alaska Native alone (NH)	0	0.00%
Asian alone (NH)	0	0.00%
Native Hawaiian or Pacific Islander alone (NH)	0	0.00%
Other race alone (NH)	1	1.11%
Mixed race or Multiracial (NH)	3	3.33%
Hispanic or Latino (any race)	10	11.11%
Total	90	100.00%
