= Yegua, Texas =

Yegua
- Ghost town
- Location in Texas
- Coordinates: 30.28943100°N 96.68390800°W
- Country: United States
- State: Texas
- County: Washington

Yegua is a ghost town in Washington County, Texas, United States.

== History ==
Yegua is situated near Yegua Creek. A post office operated in the settlement from January 1859 to June 1867, and was later abandoned.
