= Thomas, Jr., and Mary Kraitchar House =

- Thomas Kraitchar Jr. and Mary
- U.S. National Register of Historic Places
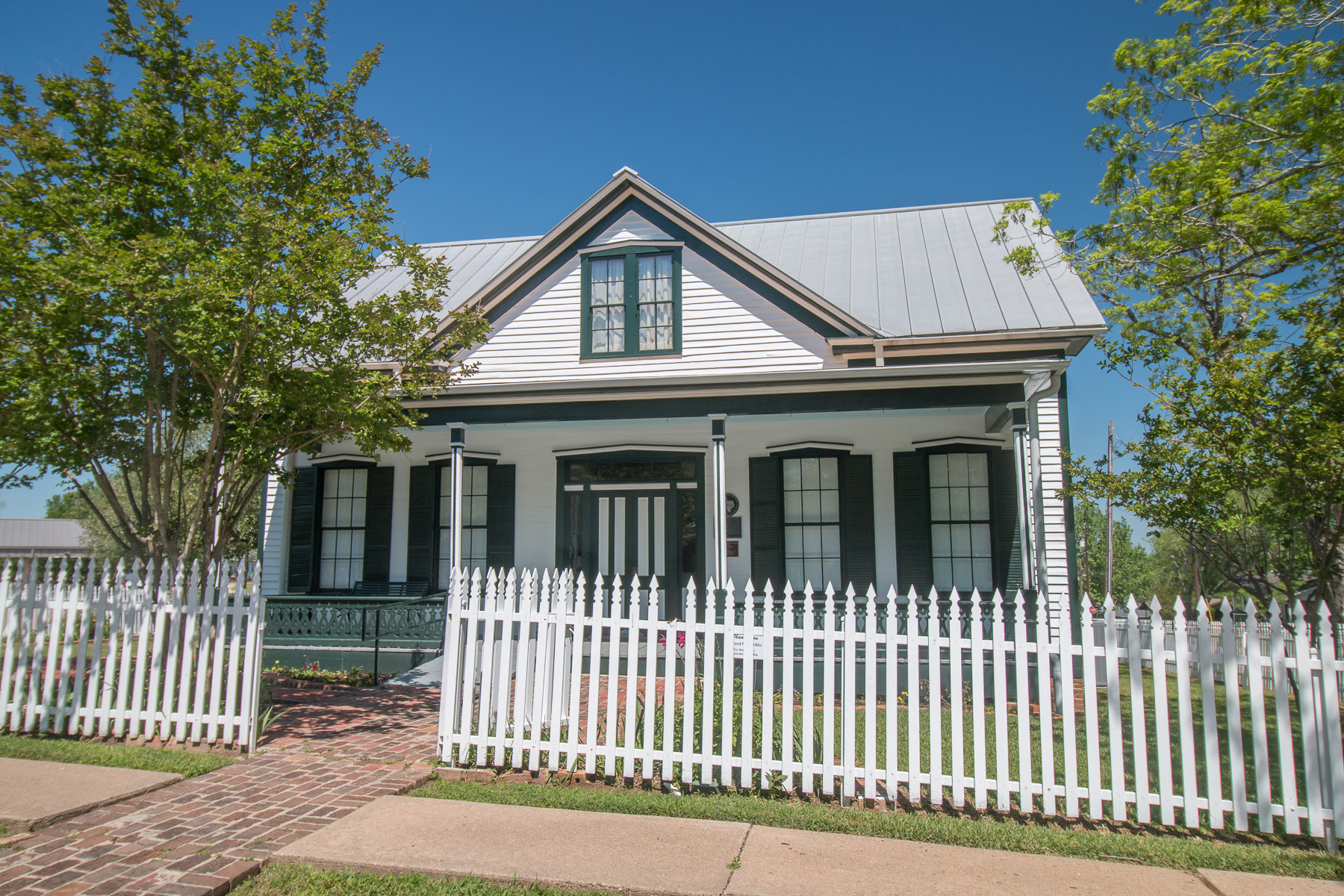
- Location: 200 E. Buck St., Caldwell, Texas
- Coordinates: 30°31′58″N 96°41′29″W
- Area: less than one acre
- Built: 1891
- Architectural style: Late Victorian
- NRHP reference No.: 02000731
- Added to NRHP: July 11, 2002

The Thomas and Mary Kraitchar Jr. House, at 203 E. Buck St. in Caldwell, Texas, was built in 1891. It was listed on the National Register of Historic Places in 2002. The listing included three contributing buildings.

It is a one-and-a-half-story wood-frame house built mainly of cypress, located "just east of the courthouse square" in downtown Caldwell. "Its symmetrical arrangement and restrained classical detailing make the house a particularly refined example of the Texas vernacular's adaptation of Late Victorian styles."

It was restored in 1982 to be used as a house museum.
