= Valley Regional Council =

Valley Regional Council may refer to:

- Bet Shean Valley Regional Council, a regional council in northern Israel that encompasses most of the settlements in the Bet Shean Valley
- Jezreel Valley Regional Council, a regional council in northern Israel that encompasses most of the settlements in the Jezreel Valley

== See also ==
- Jordan Valley Regional Council
