= Mel Deutsch =

American baseball player (1915–2001)

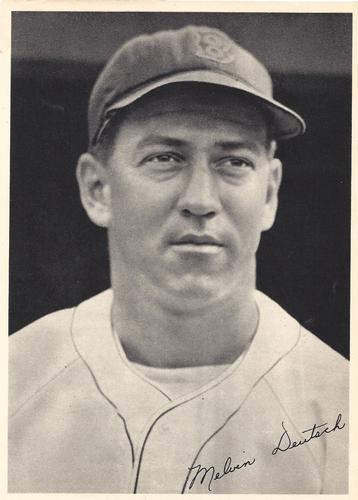
- Pitcher
- Born: July 26, 1915; Caldwell, Texas, U.S.
- Died: November 18, 2001 (aged 86); Austin, Texas, U.S.
- Batted: Switch Threw: Right

MLB debut
- April 21, 1946, for the Boston Red Sox

Last MLB appearance
- May 7, 1946, for the Boston Red Sox

MLB statistics
- Win–loss record: 0–0
- Earned run average: 5.68
- Innings pitched: 6 1/3
- Stats at Baseball Reference

Teams
- Boston Red Sox (1946)

Melvin Elliott Deutsch (July 26, 1915 – November 18, 2001) was an American professional baseball player. He was a relief pitcher in the Major Leagues who played briefly for the Boston Red Sox during the 1946 season. Listed at 6 ft 4 in (1.93 m), 215 lb., Deutsch batted and threw right-handed. He was born in Caldwell, Texas.

Deutsch was signed by the Boston Red Sox as a free agent out of the University of Texas at Austin. His professional career lasted from 1941 to 1949 (1945 and 1948 seasons excluded). He served in the United States Army during World War II, missing the 1945 season.

He made three appearances out of the Red Sox bullpen during the early weeks of Boston's 1946 pennant-winning season, posting a 5.68 ERA with two strikeouts and three walks in 6 1/3 innings of work. He allowed seven hits and did not have a decision or a save.

Deutsch was of German, Czech, and Irish descent; his father was born in Berlin, and his mother in Moravia. Languages spoken at home included German and Bohemian. Deutsch died in Austin, Texas at age 86.

== See also ==
- Boston Red Sox all-time roster
