= Somerville, Texas =

- City
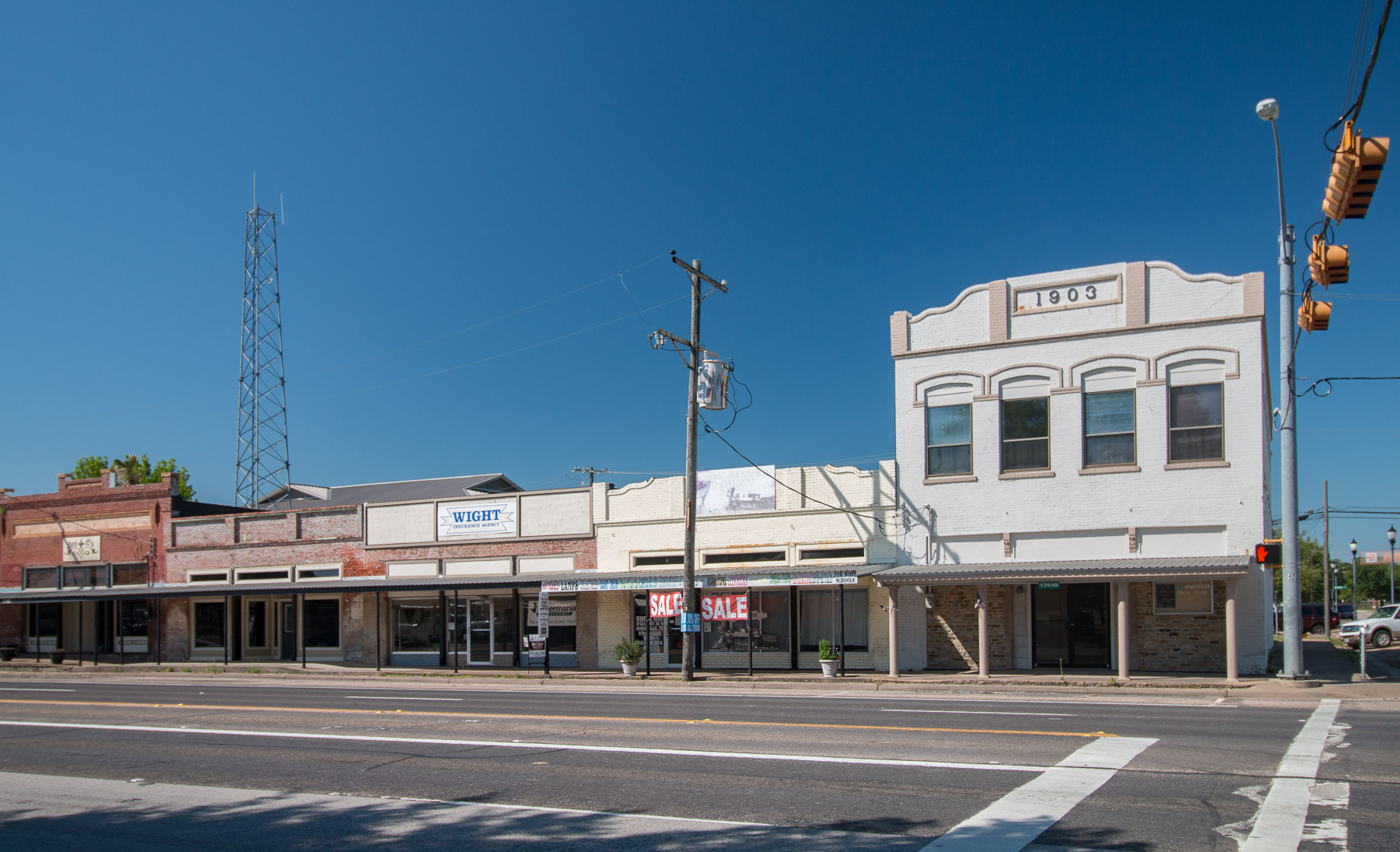
- Downtown Somerville

- Location of Somerville, Texas
- Coordinates: 30°20′45″N 96°31′52″W
- Country: United States
- State: Texas
- County: Burleson

Area
  - Total: 2.99 sq mi (7.75 km^{2})
  - Land: 2.98 sq mi (7.71 km^{2})
  - Water: 0.015 sq mi (0.04 km^{2})
- Elevation: 249 ft (76 m)

Population (2020)
  - Total: 1,312
  - Density: 492.4/sq mi (190.13/km^{2})
- Time zone: UTC-6 (Central (CST))
  - Summer (DST): UTC-5 (CDT)
- ZIP codes: 77839, 77879
- Area code: 979
- FIPS code: 48-68720
- GNIS feature ID: 2411928
- Website: somervilletx.gov

Somerville (/ˈsʌmərvɪl/ SUM-ər-vil) is a city in Burleson County, Texas, United States. The population was 1,312 at the 2020 census. Somerville is named for Albert Somerville the first president of the Gulf, Colorado and Santa Fe Railway.

== Geography ==
Somerville is located near the southern border of Burleson County and is bordered to the west by Somerville Lake, a reservoir on Yegua Creek, part of the Brazos River basin.

Texas State Highway 36 passes through the city, leading northwest 17 miles (27 km) to Caldwell, the county seat, and southeast 15 miles (24 km) to Brenham.

According to the United States Census Bureau, Somerville has a total area of 3.0 square miles (7.7 km^{2}), of which 0.02 square miles (0.05 km^{2}), or 0.60%, is water.

=== Climate ===
Somerville has a humid subtropical climate (Köppen: Cfa) with hot summers and mild winters. The all-time record high temperature is 114 °F (46 °C), recorded on September 5, 2000, and the all-time record low temperature is -1 °F (-18 °C), recorded on January 31, 1949. The average date of first frost is November 15th, and the average date of last frost is March 14th. Somerville averages 35 nights at or below freezing annually. Somerville falls into the USDA Plant Hardiness zone 8b.

Climate data for Somerville Dam (normals 1991–2020, extremes 1908–1951, 1963–present)
Month	Jan	Feb	Mar	Apr	May	Jun	Jul	Aug	Sep	Oct	Nov	Dec	Year
Record high °F (°C)	89 (32)	96 (36)	96 (36)	98 (37)	110 (43)	109 (43)	111 (44)	109 (43)	114 (46)	100 (38)	94 (34)	89 (32)	114 (46)
Mean maximum °F (°C)	77.9 (25.5)	81.4 (27.4)	86.1 (30.1)	89.7 (32.1)	95.3 (35.2)	99.6 (37.6)	101.9 (38.8)	103.7 (39.8)	99.9 (37.7)	94.0 (34.4)	86.3 (30.2)	80.5 (26.9)	105.0 (40.6)
Mean daily maximum °F (°C)	62.4 (16.9)	65.9 (18.8)	72.8 (22.7)	79.8 (26.6)	86.9 (30.5)	93.3 (34.1)	96.6 (35.9)	97.8 (36.6)	92.1 (33.4)	83.4 (28.6)	72.3 (22.4)	64.4 (18.0)	80.6 (27.0)
Daily mean °F (°C)	48.6 (9.2)	52.4 (11.3)	59.2 (15.1)	66.3 (19.1)	74.2 (23.4)	80.7 (27.1)	83.5 (28.6)	83.9 (28.8)	78.1 (25.6)	68.2 (20.1)	58.3 (14.6)	50.6 (10.3)	67.0 (19.4)
Mean daily minimum °F (°C)	34.7 (1.5)	38.9 (3.8)	45.6 (7.6)	52.7 (11.5)	61.5 (16.4)	68.2 (20.1)	70.4 (21.3)	70.0 (21.1)	64.1 (17.8)	53.1 (11.7)	44.2 (6.8)	36.8 (2.7)	53.4 (11.9)
Mean minimum °F (°C)	19.6 (−6.9)	25.2 (−3.8)	28.9 (−1.7)	37.5 (3.1)	48.1 (8.9)	61.2 (16.2)	65.7 (18.7)	64.9 (18.3)	53.0 (11.7)	38.7 (3.7)	28.2 (−2.1)	23.6 (−4.7)	17.8 (−7.9)
Record low °F (°C)	−1 (−18)	7 (−14)	16 (−9)	27 (−3)	31 (−1)	52 (11)	55 (13)	55 (13)	39 (4)	24 (−4)	15 (−9)	3 (−16)	−1 (−18)
Average precipitation inches (mm)	3.17 (81)	2.92 (74)	3.22 (82)	3.33 (85)	4.73 (120)	3.94 (100)	1.88 (48)	2.81 (71)	3.41 (87)	4.34 (110)	3.55 (90)	3.65 (93)	40.95 (1,041)
Average snowfall inches (cm)	0.0 (0.0)	0.0 (0.0)	0.0 (0.0)	0.0 (0.0)	0.0 (0.0)	0.0 (0.0)	0.0 (0.0)	0.0 (0.0)	0.0 (0.0)	0.0 (0.0)	0.0 (0.0)	0.0 (0.0)	0 (0)
Average precipitation days (≥ 0.1 in)	5.0	4.4	4.7	4.2	5.8	5.2	3.8	4.0	4.2	4.8	5.3	5.3	56.7
Average snowy days (≥ 0.1 in)	0.0	0.0	0.0	0.0	0.0	0.0	0.0	0.0	0.0	0.0	0.0	0.0	0
Source: NOAA

== Demographics ==
Historical population
Census	Pop.	Note	%±
1920	1,879		—
1930	2,287		21.7%
1940	1,621		−29.1%
1950	1,425		−12.1%
1960	1,177		−17.4%
1970	1,250		6.2%
1980	1,814		45.1%
1990	1,542		−15.0%
2000	1,704		10.5%
2010	1,376		−19.2%
2020	1,312		−4.7%
U.S. Decennial Census; 1850–1900 1910; 1920 1930 1940 1950 1960 1970 1980 1990 2000; 2010

=== 2020 census ===
As of the 2020 census, Somerville had a population of 1,312, 504 households, and 284 families, and the median age was 39.6 years. 25.1% of residents were under the age of 18 and 19.9% of residents were 65 years of age or older. For every 100 females there were 88.2 males, and for every 100 females age 18 and over there were 88.3 males age 18 and over.

0.0% of residents lived in urban areas, while 100.0% lived in rural areas.

Of the 504 households in Somerville, 33.9% had children under the age of 18 living in them. Of all households, 41.9% were married-couple households, 21.4% were households with a male householder and no spouse or partner present, and 31.3% were households with a female householder and no spouse or partner present. About 30.6% of all households were made up of individuals and 14.9% had someone living alone who was 65 years of age or older.

There were 614 housing units, of which 17.9% were vacant. The homeowner vacancy rate was 1.1% and the rental vacancy rate was 11.3%.

Racial composition as of the 2020 census
Race	Number	Percent
White	587	44.7%
Black or African American	308	23.5%
American Indian and Alaska Native	12	0.9%
Asian	4	0.3%
Native Hawaiian and Other Pacific Islander	0	0.0%
Some other race	126	9.6%
Two or more races	275	21.0%
Hispanic or Latino (of any race)	439	33.5%

=== 2000 census ===
As of the 2000 census, there were 1,704 people, 639 households, and 430 families residing in the city. The population density was 571.1 inhabitants per square mile (220.5/km^{2}). There were 768 housing units at an average density of 257.4 per square mile (99.4/km^{2}). The racial makeup of the city was 54.17% White, 30.52% African American, 1.06% Native American, 0.12% Asian, 11.80% from other races, and 2.35% from two or more races. Hispanic or Latino of any race were 21.48% of the population.

There were 639 households, out of which 31.6% had children under the age of 18 living with them, 43.8% were married couples living together, 18.6% had a female householder with no husband present, and 32.6% were non-families. 28.6% of all households were made up of individuals, and 14.6% had someone living alone who was 65 years of age or older. The average household size was 2.67 and the average family size was 3.32.

In the city, the population was spread out, with 30.9% under the age of 18, 9.2% from 18 to 24, 24.9% from 25 to 44, 20.0% from 45 to 64, and 15.0% who were 65 years of age or older. The median age was 34 years. For every 100 females, there were 94.1 males. For every 100 females age 18 and over, there were 87.3 males.

The median income for a household in the city was $26,208, and the median income for a family was $34,844. Males had a median income of $25,679 versus $17,379 for females. The per capita income for the city was $12,995. About 18.3% of families and 24.0% of the population were below the poverty line, including 34.5% of those under age 18 and 15.8% of those age 65 or over.

== Education ==
Somerville is served by the Somerville Independent School District.
