= Snook Independent School District =

School district in Texas, United States

Address
- 10110 FM 2155 Somerville, Texas, 77879; United States

District information
- Type: Public
- Grades: PK–12
- Schools: 2
- NCES District ID: 4840620

Students and staff
- Students: 606 (2023–2024)
- Teachers: 50.78 (on an FTE basis) (2023–2024)
- Staff: 52.60 (on an FTE basis) (2023–2024)
- Student–teacher ratio: 11.93 (2023–2024)

Other information
- Website: www.snookisd.org

Snook Independent School District is a public school district based in Snook, Texas, (USA). The district serves students in eastern Burleson County. Snook ISD is located approximately 15 minutes from Texas A&M University in a primarily agriculture-based community. This makes the area a prime location for residing and attending school.

As of 2023 the district has about 60 teachers and over 600 students. The district has experienced increased student enrollment growth from 2022 to 2024, with more than a 10% increase. This is primarily due to the increase of housing and development in the area.

== Schools ==
Snook ISD has two campuses -

- Snook Secondary School (Grades 6–12)
- Snook Elementary School (Grades PK-5)

In 2022, the school district was rated "academically acceptable" by the Texas Education Agency with each campus receiving an overall "B" rating, and the district receiving an overall "A" rating.

== History and legacy ==
The district is known for its boys basketball legacy and domination during the 1960s to 1980s, winning ten state championships (1965, 1966, 1969, 1978, 1979, 1980, 1981, 1982, 1983, and 1984).
