= Deanville, Texas =

- Census-designated place
- Location within Texas Location within the United States
- Coordinates: 30°25′46″N 96°45′25″W
- Country: United States
- State: Texas
- County: Burleson
- Elevation: 371 ft (113 m)

Population (2020)
  - Total: 63
- Time zone: UTC-6 (Central (CST))
  - Summer (DST): UTC-5 (CDT)
- GNIS feature ID: 2805747

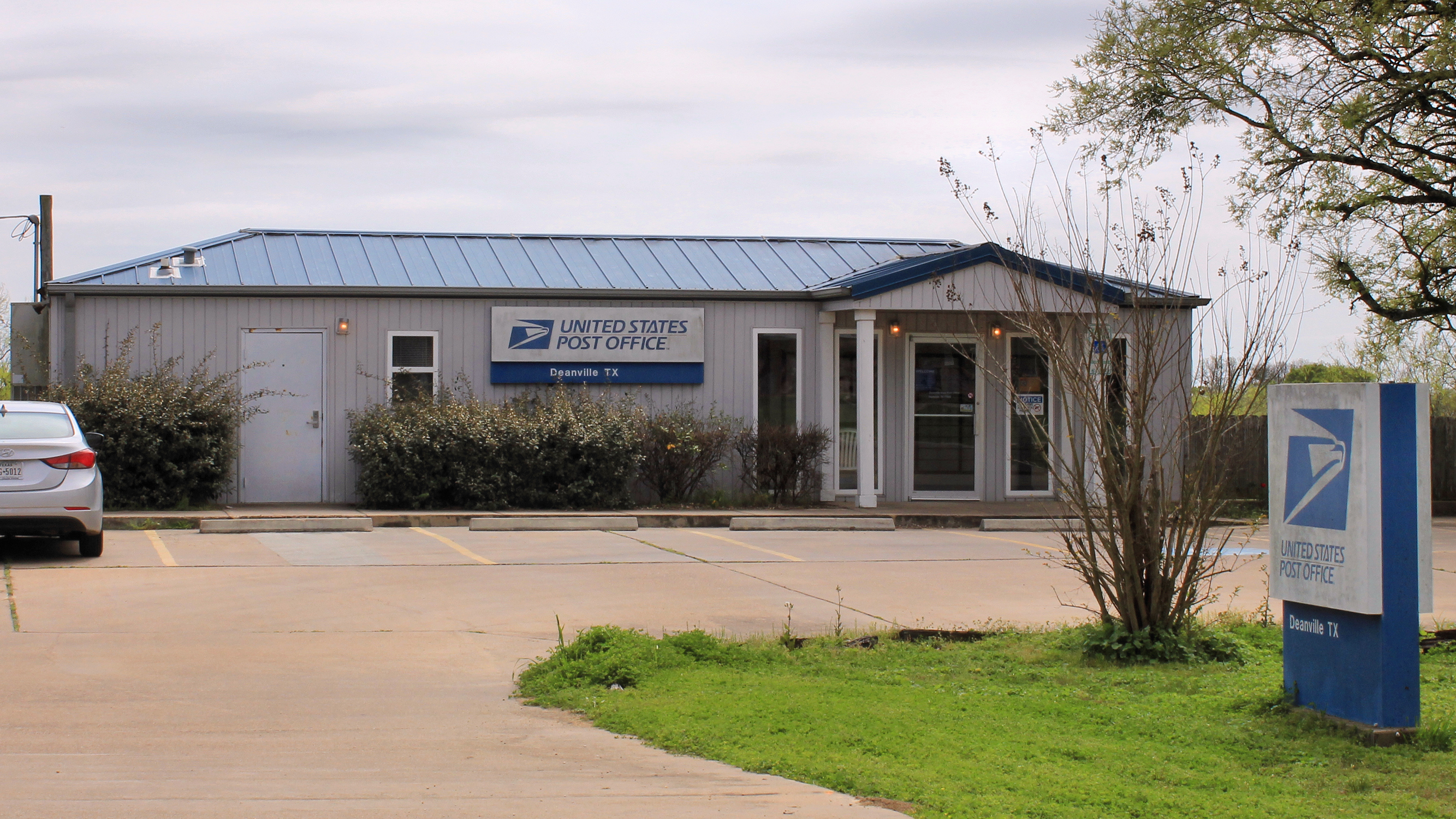
Deanville post office

Deanville is an unincorporated community and census-designated place (CDP) in Burleson County, Texas, United States. Deanville has a post office, with the ZIP code 77852. It was first listed as a CDP in the 2020 census with a population of 63.

== Demographics ==
Historical population
Census	Pop.	Note	%±
2020	63		—
U.S. Decennial Census; 1850–1900 1910; 1920 1930 1940; 1950 1960 1970; 1980 1990 2000; 2010 2020

Deanville first appeared as a census designated place in the 2020 U.S. census.

=== 2020 census ===
Deanville CDP, Texas – Racial and ethnic composition Note: the US Census treats Hispanic/Latino as an ethnic category. This table excludes Latinos from the racial categories and assigns them to a separate category. Hispanics/Latinos may be of any race.
Race / Ethnicity (NH = Non-Hispanic)	Pop 2020	% 2020
White alone (NH)	58	92.06%
Black or African American alone (NH)	0	0.00%
Native American or Alaska Native alone (NH)	0	0.00%
Asian alone (NH)	0	0.00%
Pacific Islander alone (NH)|Native Hawaiian or Pacific Islander alone (NH)|0	0.00%	
Other race alone (NH)	0	0.00%
Mixed race or Multiracial (NH)	4	6.35%
Hispanic or Latino (any race)	1	1.59%
Total	63	100.00%
