= Snook, Texas =

- City
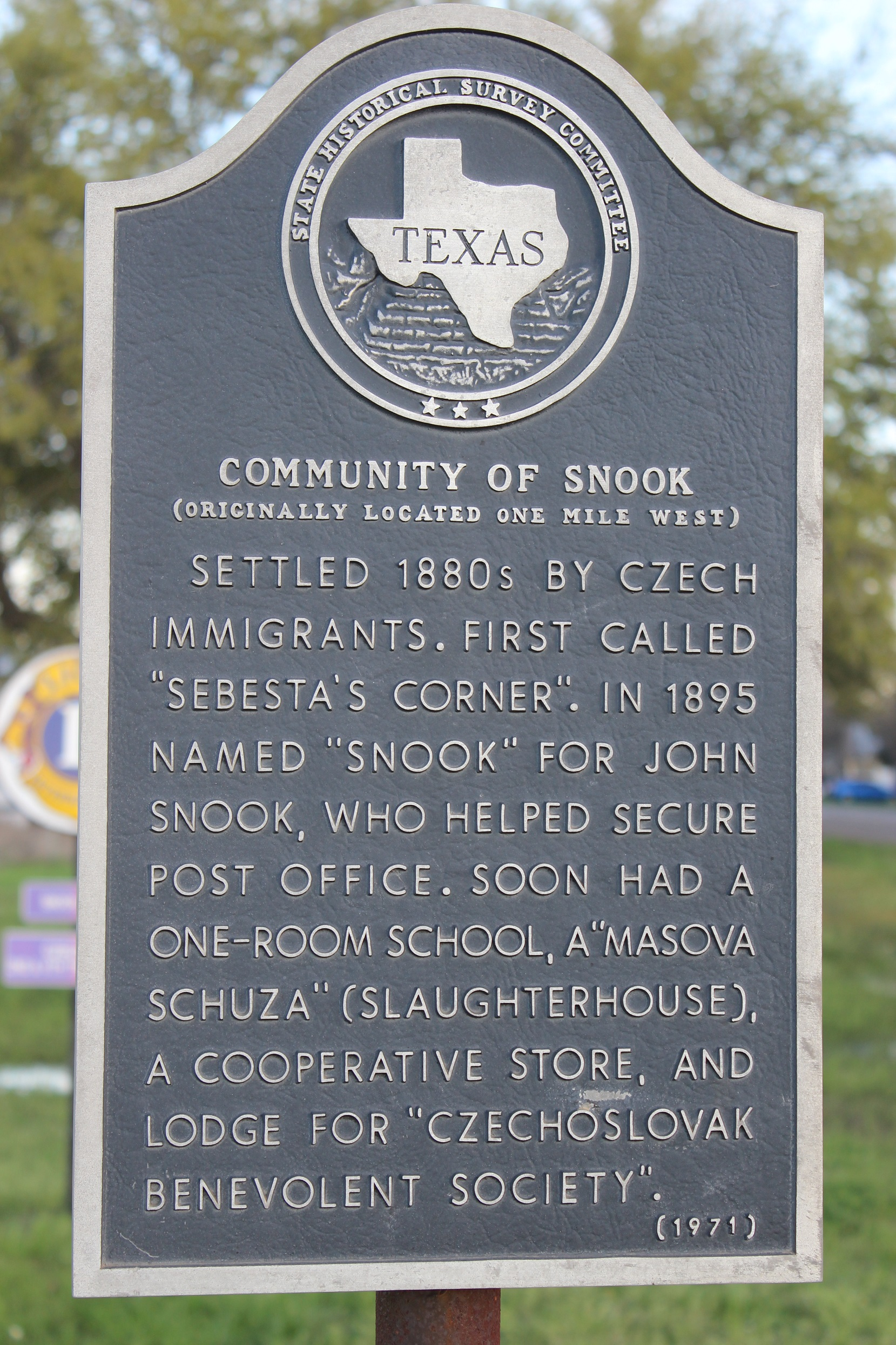

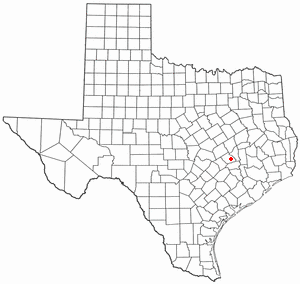
- Location of Snook, Texas

- Coordinates: 30°29′45″N 96°28′04″W
- Country: United States
- State: Texas
- County: Burleson

Area
  - Total: 2.02 sq mi (5.24 km^{2})
  - Land: 2.02 sq mi (5.22 km^{2})
  - Water: 0.0077 sq mi (0.02 km^{2})
- Elevation: 243 ft (74 m)

Population (2020)
  - Total: 506
  - Density: 268.7/sq mi (103.73/km^{2})
- Time zone: UTC-6 (Central (CST))
  - Summer (DST): UTC-5 (CDT)
- ZIP code: 77878
- Area code: 979
- FIPS code: 48-68576
- GNIS feature ID: 2411914
- Website: www.cityofsnook.com

Snook is a city in Burleson County, Texas, United States. Its population was 506 at the 2020 census.

== Geography ==
Snook is 13 miles (21 km) southwest of College Station and 17 miles (27 km) southeast of Caldwell, the Burleson County seat.

According to the United States Census Bureau, the city has a total area of 2.0 square miles (5.2 km^{2}), of which 0.008 sq mi (0.02 km^{2}), or 0.46%, is covered by water.

== Demographics ==
Historical population
| Census | Pop. | Note | %± |
|---|---|---|---|
| 1980 | 408 | | — |
| 1990 | 489 | | 19.9% |
| 2000 | 568 | | 16.2% |
| 2010 | 511 | | −10.0% |
| 2020 | 506 | | −1.0% |
U.S. Decennial Census; 1850–1900 1910; 1920 1930 1940; 1950 1960 1970; 1980 1990 2000; 2010

=== 2020 census ===
As of the 2020 census, Snook had a population of 506, 221 households, and 159 families living in the city. The median age was 43.1 years; 20.8% of residents were under the age of 18 and 18.8% were 65 years of age or older. For every 100 females there were 86.0 males, and for every 100 females age 18 and over there were 88.3 males age 18 and over.

As of the 2020 census, 0.0% of residents lived in urban areas, while 100.0% lived in rural areas.

As of the 2020 census, of the 221 households, 36.2% had children under the age of 18 living in them. Of all households, 43.4% were married-couple households, 17.6% were households with a male householder and no spouse or partner present, and 33.5% were households with a female householder and no spouse or partner present. About 20.8% of all households were made up of individuals and 8.6% had someone living alone who was 65 years of age or older.

As of the 2020 census, there were 249 housing units, of which 11.2% were vacant. The homeowner vacancy rate was 0.0% and the rental vacancy rate was 9.4%.

Racial composition as of the 2020 census
| Race | Number | Percent |
|---|---|---|
| White | 315 | 62.3% |
| Black or African American | 96 | 19.0% |
| American Indian and Alaska Native | 4 | 0.8% |
| Asian | 1 | 0.2% |
| Native Hawaiian and Other Pacific Islander | 0 | 0.0% |
| Some other race | 47 | 9.3% |
| Two or more races | 43 | 8.5% |
| Hispanic or Latino (of any race) | 98 | 19.4% |

=== 2000 census ===
As of the 2000 census, 568 people, 221 households, and 160 families resided in the city. The population density was 282.6 inhabitants per square mile (109.1/km^{2}). The 252 housing units had an average density of 125.4 per square mile (48.4/km^{2}). The racial makeup of the city was 75.70% White, 21.13% African American, 0.18% Asian, 2.64% from other races, and 0.35% from two or more races. Hispanics or Latinos of any race were 10.39% of the population.

Of the 221 households, 37.6% had children under 18 living with them, 51.6% were married couples living together, 17.2% had a female householder with no husband present, and 27.6% were nont families. About 24.0% of all households were made up of individuals, and 10.9% had someone living alone who was 65 or older. The average household size was 2.57 and the average family size was 3.03.

In the city, the age distribution was 29.6% under 18, 10.6% from 18 to 24, 27.3% from 25 to 44, 19.2% from 45 to 64, and 13.4% who were 65 or older. The median age was 32 years. For every 100 females, there were 90.0 males. For every 100 females 18 and over, there were 84.3 males.

The median income for a household in the city was $34,722 and for a family was $37,656. Males had a median income of $31,528 versus $23,125 for females. The per capita income for the city was $14,965. About 14.7% of families and 16.9% of the population were below the poverty line, including 18.9% of those under 18 and 11.8% of those 65 or over.

== Education ==
Snook is served by the Snook Independent School District and home to the Snook Secondary School Bluejays.

== Attractions and events ==
Snook is the home of Chilifest, an annual charity event held since 1991 that attracts some of the biggest names in country music for a two-day chili cook-off and concert. This event attracts more than 50,000 people each year. According to the event's web site, Chilifest has donated more than $3,500,000 to area organizations such as Burleson County Go-Texan, the Boys and Girls Club of Brazos Valley, and the Snook Volunteer Fire Department.
