= Caldwell Independent School District =

School district in Texas, United States

Address
- 203 North Gray Street Caldwell, Texas, 77836; United States

District information
- Type: Public
- Grades: PK–12
- Schools: 4
- NCES District ID: 4812460

Students and staff
- Students: 1,965 (2023–2024)
- Teachers: 143.97 (on an FTE basis) (2023–2024)
- Staff: 171.58 (on an FTE basis) (2023–2024)
- Student–teacher ratio: 13.65 (2023–2024)

Other information
- Website: www.caldwellisd.net

Caldwell Independent School District is a public school district based in Caldwell, Texas (US).

The district serves northern and western portions of Burleson County.

In 2009 the school district was rated "academically acceptable" by the Texas Education Agency.

== Schools ==
- Caldwell High School (Grades 9–12)
- Caldwell Middle (Grades 7–8)
- Caldwell Intermediate (Grades 5–6)
- Caldwell Elementary (Grades PK–4)
