= Burleson County, Texas =

County in Texas, United States

- County
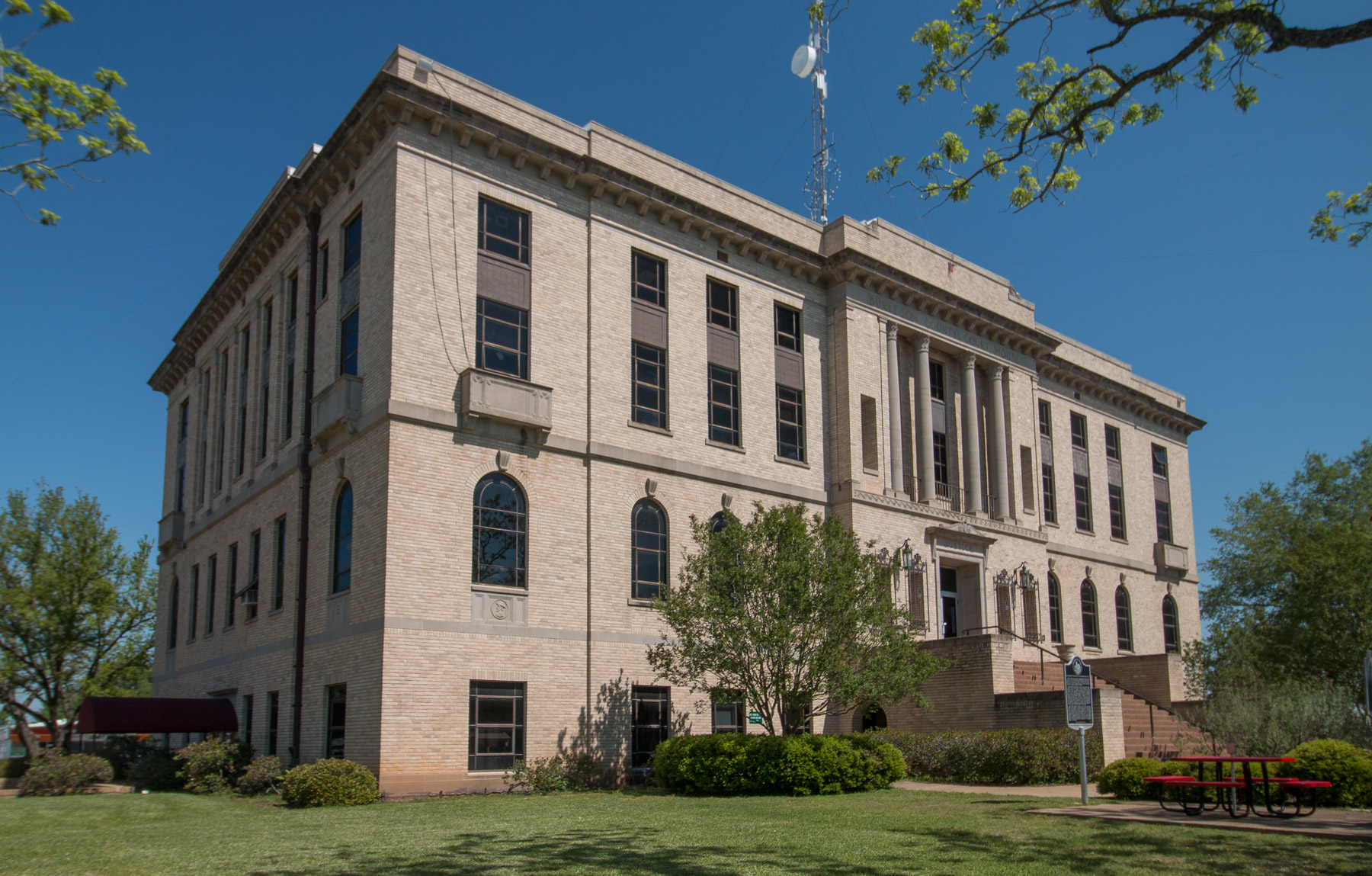
- The Burleson County Courthouse in Caldwell

- Location within the U.S. state of Texas
- Coordinates: 30°29′N 96°37′W
- Country: United States
- State: Texas
- Founded: 1846
- Named for: Edward Burleson
- Seat: Caldwell
- Largest city: Caldwell

Area
  - Total: 677 sq mi (1,750 km^{2})
  - Land: 659 sq mi (1,710 km^{2})
  - Water: 18 sq mi (47 km^{2}) 2.6%

Population (2020)
  - Total: 17,642
  - Estimate (2025): 20,549 ▲
  - Density: 26.8/sq mi (10.3/km^{2})
- Time zone: UTC−6 (Central)
  - Summer (DST): UTC−5 (CDT)
- Congressional district: 10th
- Website: www.burlesoncountytx.gov

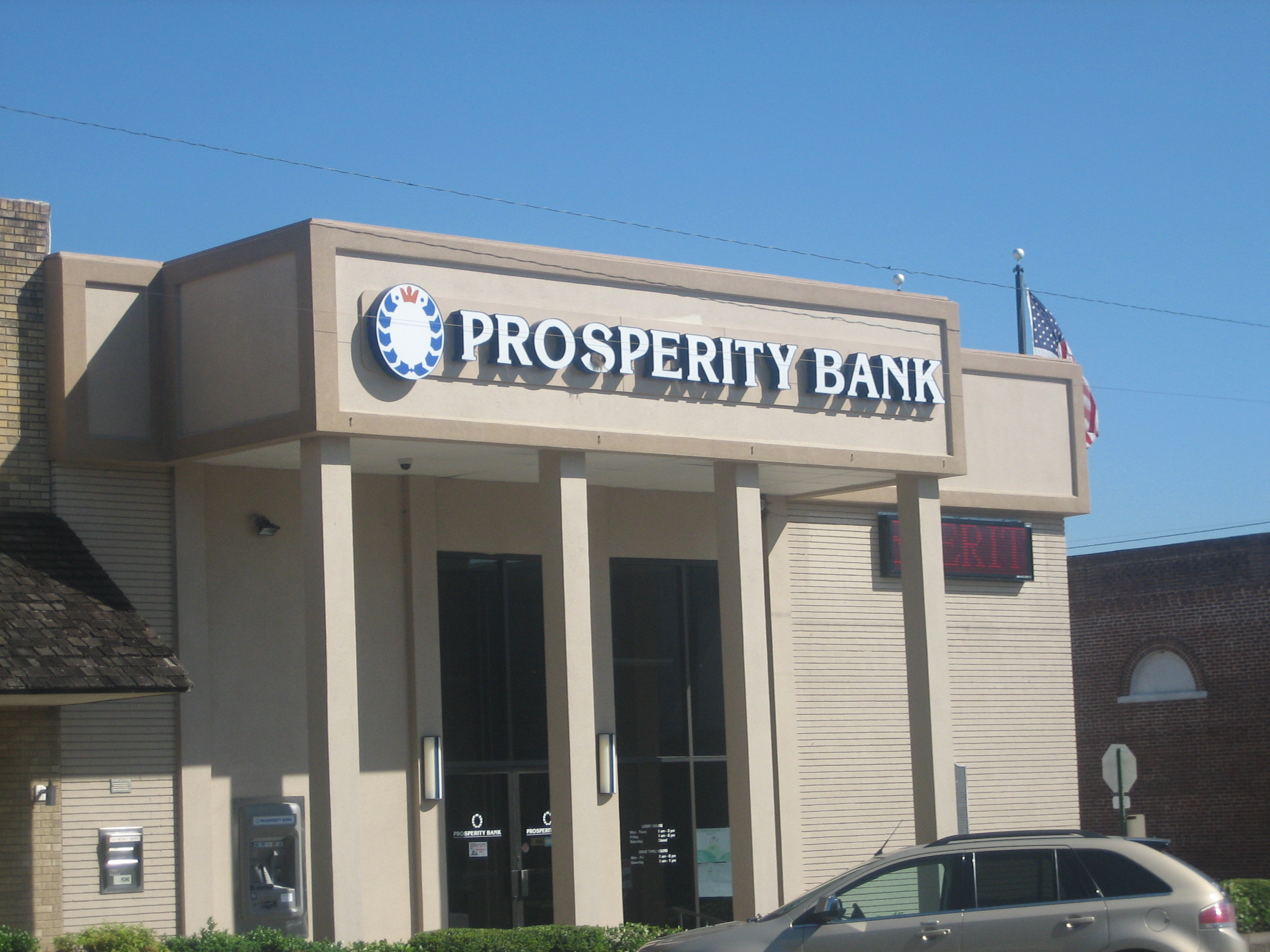
Prosperity Bank is located across the street from the Burleson County Courthouse in Caldwell.

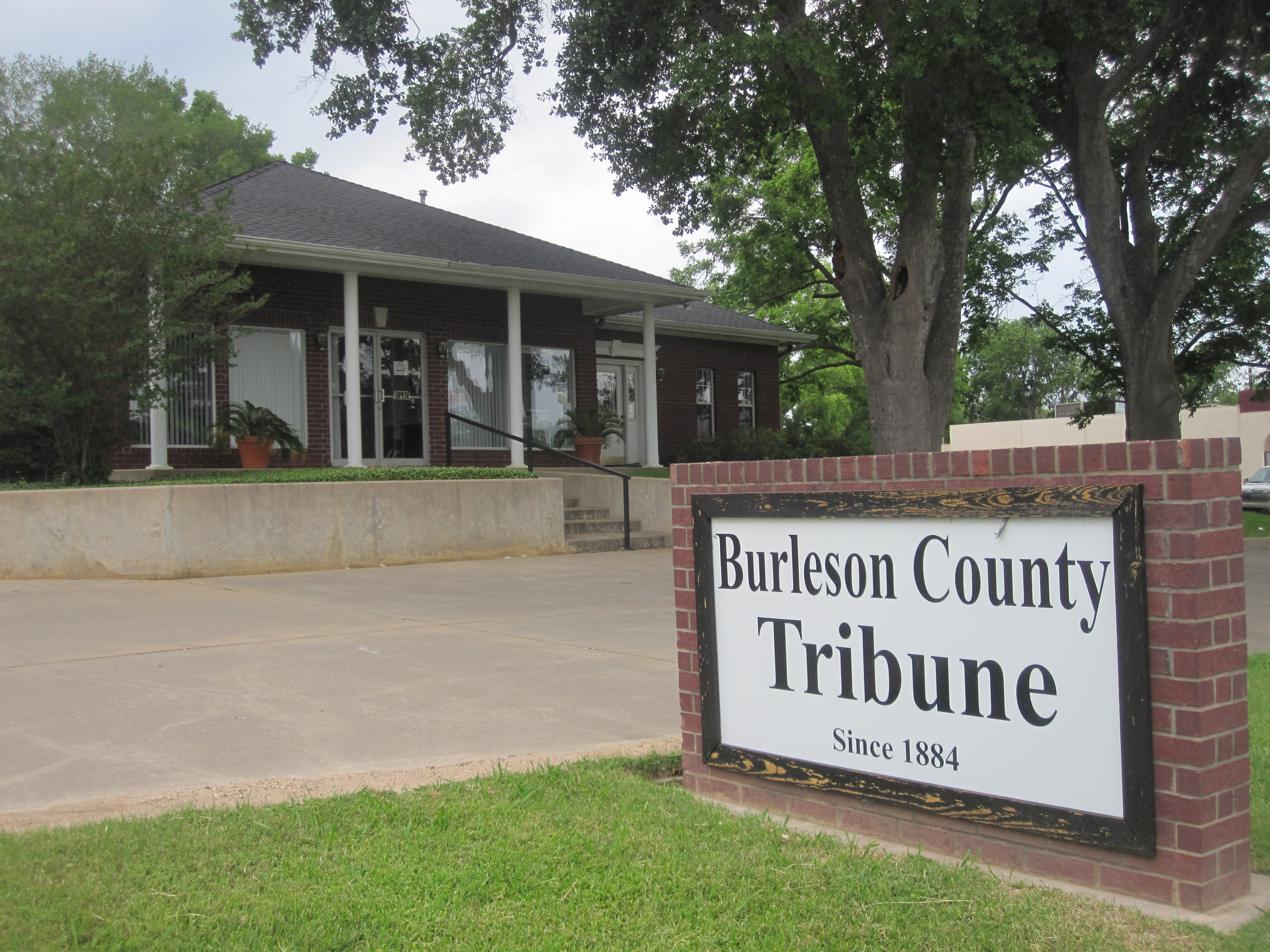
Office of Burleson County Tribune (founded 1884) in Caldwell

Burleson County (/ˈbɜːrlɪsən/ BUR-liss-ən) is a county located in the U.S. state of Texas. As of the 2020 census, its population was 17,642. Its county seat is Caldwell. The county is named for Edward Burleson, a general and statesman of the Texas Revolution.

Burleson County is part of the College Station-Bryan metropolitan statistical area.

== Geography ==
According to the U.S. Census Bureau, the county has a total area of 677 square miles (1,750 km^{2}), of which 18 square miles (47 km^{2}) (2.6%) are covered by water.

=== Major highways ===
- State Highway 21
- State Highway 36
- Loop 83

=== Adjacent counties ===
- Robertson County (north)
- Brazos County (northeast)
- Washington County (southeast)
- Lee County (southwest)
- Milam County (northwest)

== Demographics ==
Historical population
Census	Pop.	Note	%±
1850	1,713		—
1860	5,683		231.8%
1870	8,072		42.0%
1880	9,243		14.5%
1890	13,001		40.7%
1900	18,367		41.3%
1910	18,687		1.7%
1920	16,855		−9.8%
1930	19,848		17.8%
1940	18,334		−7.6%
1950	13,000		−29.1%
1960	11,177		−14.0%
1970	9,999		−10.5%
1980	12,313		23.1%
1990	13,625		10.7%
2000	16,470		20.9%
2010	17,187		4.4%
2020	17,642		2.6%
2025 (est.)	20,549	▲	16.5%
U.S. Decennial Census; 1850–2010 2010 2020

=== 2020 census ===
As of the 2020 census, the county had a population of 17,642. The median age was 46.9 years. 21.1% of residents were under the age of 18 and 22.6% of residents were 65 years of age or older. For every 100 females there were 97.2 males, and for every 100 females age 18 and over there were 96.4 males age 18 and over.

The racial makeup of the county was 68.9% White, 10.8% Black or African American, 0.8% American Indian and Alaska Native, 0.4% Asian, <0.1% Native Hawaiian and Pacific Islander, 7.4% from some other race, and 11.7% from two or more races. Hispanic or Latino residents of any race comprised 21.0% of the population.

Fewewr than 0.1% of residents lived in urban areas, while about 100.0% lived in rural areas.

Of the 7,183 households in the county, 27.4% had children under 18 living in them, 51.5% were married-couple households, 19.4% were households with a male householder and no spouse or partner present, and 24.4% were households with a female householder and no spouse or partner present. About 27.9% of all households were made up of individuals, and 13.9% had someone living alone who was 65 or older.

Thee 9,351 housing units had a 23.2% vacancy rate. Among occupied housing units, 80.0% were owner-occupied and 20.0% were renter-occupied. The homeowner vacancy rate was 1.5% and the rental vacancy rate was 7.8%.

=== Racial and ethnic composition ===
Burleson County, Texas – Racial and ethnic composition Note: the US Census treats Hispanic/Latino as an ethnic category. This table excludes Latinos from the racial categories and assigns them to a separate category. Hispanics/Latinos may be of any race.
Race / Ethnicity (NH = Non-Hispanic)	Pop 1980	Pop 1990	Pop 2000	Pop 2010	Pop 2020	% 1980	% 1990	% 2000	% 2010	% 2020
White alone (NH)	8,347	9,543	11,361	11,696	11,258	67.79%	70.04%	68.98%	68.05%	63.81%
Black or African American alone (NH)	2,643	2,392	2,443	2,064	1,852	21.47%	17.56%	14.83%	12.01%	10.50%
Native American or Alaska Native alone (NH)	10	40	54	48	65	0.08%	0.29%	0.33%	0.28%	0.37%
Asian alone (NH)	2	9	25	25	70	0.02%	0.07%	0.15%	0.15%	0.40%
Native Hawaiian or Pacific Islander alone (NH)	x	x	3	3	0	x	x	0.02%	0.02%	0.00%
Other race alone (NH)	37	17	11	7	34	0.30%	0.12%	0.07%	0.04%	0.19%
Mixed race or Multiracial (NH)	x	x	162	178	651	x	x	0.98%	1.04%	3.69%
Hispanic or Latino (any race)	1,274	1,624	2,411	3,166	3,712	10.35%	11.92%	14.64%	18.42%	21.04%
Total	12,313	13,625	16,470	17,187	17,642	100.00%	100.00%	100.00%	100.00%	100.00%

=== 2000 census ===
As of the 2000 census, 16,470 people, 6,363 households, and 4,574 families resided in the county. The population density was 25 people per square mile (9.7 people/km^{2}). The 8,197 housing units had an average density of 12 per square mile (4.6/km^{2}). The racial makeup of the county was 74.07% White, 15.06% African American, 0.50% Native American, 0.17% Asian, 0.02% Pacific Islander, 8.25% from other races, and 1.92% from two or more races. About 14.64% of the population were Hispanics or Latinos of any race. Around 18.8% were of German, 11.3% American, 10.7% Czech, and 6.2% Irish ancestry according to Census 2000.

Of the 6,363 households, 31.9% had children under 18 living with them, 56.4% were married couples living together, 11.4% had a female householder with no husband present, and 28.1% were not families. About 24.9% of all households were made up of individuals, and 12.4% had someone living alone who was 65 or older. The average household size was 2.57 and the average family size was 3.08.

In the county, the age distribution was 26.9% under 18, 8.0% from 18 to 24, 25.8% from 25 to 44, 23.2% from 45 to 64, and 16.1% who were 65 or older. The median age was 38 years. For every 100 females, there were 94.70 males. For every 100 females 18 and over, there were 91.50 males.

The median income for a household in the county was $33,026 and for a family was $39,385. Males had a median income of $28,795 versus $20,146 for females. The per capita income for the county was $16,616. About 13.20% of families and 17.20% of the population were below the poverty line, including 22.90% of those under 18 and 14.30% of those 65 or over.

== Communities ==
=== Cities ===
- Caldwell (county seat)
- Snook
- Somerville

=== Census-designated places ===
- Beaver Creek
- Cade Lakes
- Clay
- Deanville
- Lyons
- Tunis

=== Other unincorporated communities ===
- Chriesman
- Cooks Point
- Frenstat
- Hix
- Rita
- Wilcox

=== Ghost towns ===
- Birch
- Chances Store
- Goodwill
- Merle
- Scofield

== Politics ==
United States presidential election results for Burleson County, Texas
Year	Republican		Democratic		Third party(ies)	
Year	No.	%	No.	%	No.	%
1912	228	21.09%	771	71.32%	82	7.59%
1916	262	17.53%	1,208	80.80%	25	1.67%
1920	141	7.09%	981	49.35%	866	43.56%
1924	224	8.16%	2,496	90.96%	24	0.87%
1928	339	17.87%	1,558	82.13%	0	0.00%
1932	119	4.68%	2,423	95.21%	3	0.12%
1936	135	8.43%	1,466	91.57%	0	0.00%
1940	319	13.74%	1,999	86.13%	3	0.13%
1944	158	6.56%	1,992	82.76%	257	10.68%
1948	240	9.86%	2,051	84.26%	143	5.88%
1952	1,052	30.85%	2,347	68.83%	11	0.32%
1956	1,173	40.24%	1,726	59.21%	16	0.55%
1960	672	21.38%	2,466	78.46%	5	0.16%
1964	617	19.61%	2,527	80.30%	3	0.10%
1968	891	27.31%	1,678	51.43%	694	21.27%
1972	1,762	56.38%	1,361	43.55%	2	0.06%
1976	1,142	27.98%	2,924	71.65%	15	0.37%
1980	1,943	42.16%	2,615	56.74%	51	1.11%
1984	3,076	54.29%	2,578	45.50%	12	0.21%
1988	2,242	41.99%	3,085	57.78%	12	0.22%
1992	2,013	35.25%	2,511	43.97%	1,187	20.78%
1996	2,174	43.89%	2,419	48.84%	360	7.27%
2000	3,542	60.38%	2,235	38.10%	89	1.52%
2004	4,405	65.54%	2,276	33.86%	40	0.60%
2008	4,547	68.22%	2,053	30.80%	65	0.98%
2012	4,671	72.35%	1,705	26.41%	80	1.24%
2016	5,316	76.38%	1,491	21.42%	153	2.20%
2020	6,743	78.33%	1,788	20.77%	78	0.91%
2024	7,590	81.01%	1,705	18.20%	74	0.79%

=== County-wide elected officials ===
- County Judge - Keith Schroeder
- County Commissioner Pct 1 - Dwayne Faust
- County Commissioner Pct 2 - Vincent Svec
- County Commissioner Pct 3 - David Hildebrand
- County Commissioner Pct 4 - Bobby Urbanosky

United States Senate election results for Burleson County, Texas1
Year	Republican		Democratic		Third party(ies)	
Year	No.	%	No.	%	No.	%
2024	7,327	78.61%	1,805	19.36%	189	2.03%

United States Senate election results for Burleson County, Texas2
Year	Republican		Democratic		Third party(ies)	
Year	No.	%	No.	%	No.	%
2020	6,596	77.70%	1,709	20.13%	184	2.17%

Texas Gubernatorial election results for Burleson County
Year	Republican		Democratic		Third party(ies)	
Year	No.	%	No.	%	No.	%
2022	5,506	82.03%	1,142	17.01%	64	0.95%

== Education ==
School districts:

- Caldwell Independent School District
- Snook Independent School District
- Somerville Independent School District

Blinn College is the designated community college for all of the county.

== See also ==
- National Register of Historic Places listings in Burleson County, Texas
- Recorded Texas Historic Landmarks in Burleson County
