= Caldwell, Texas =

- City
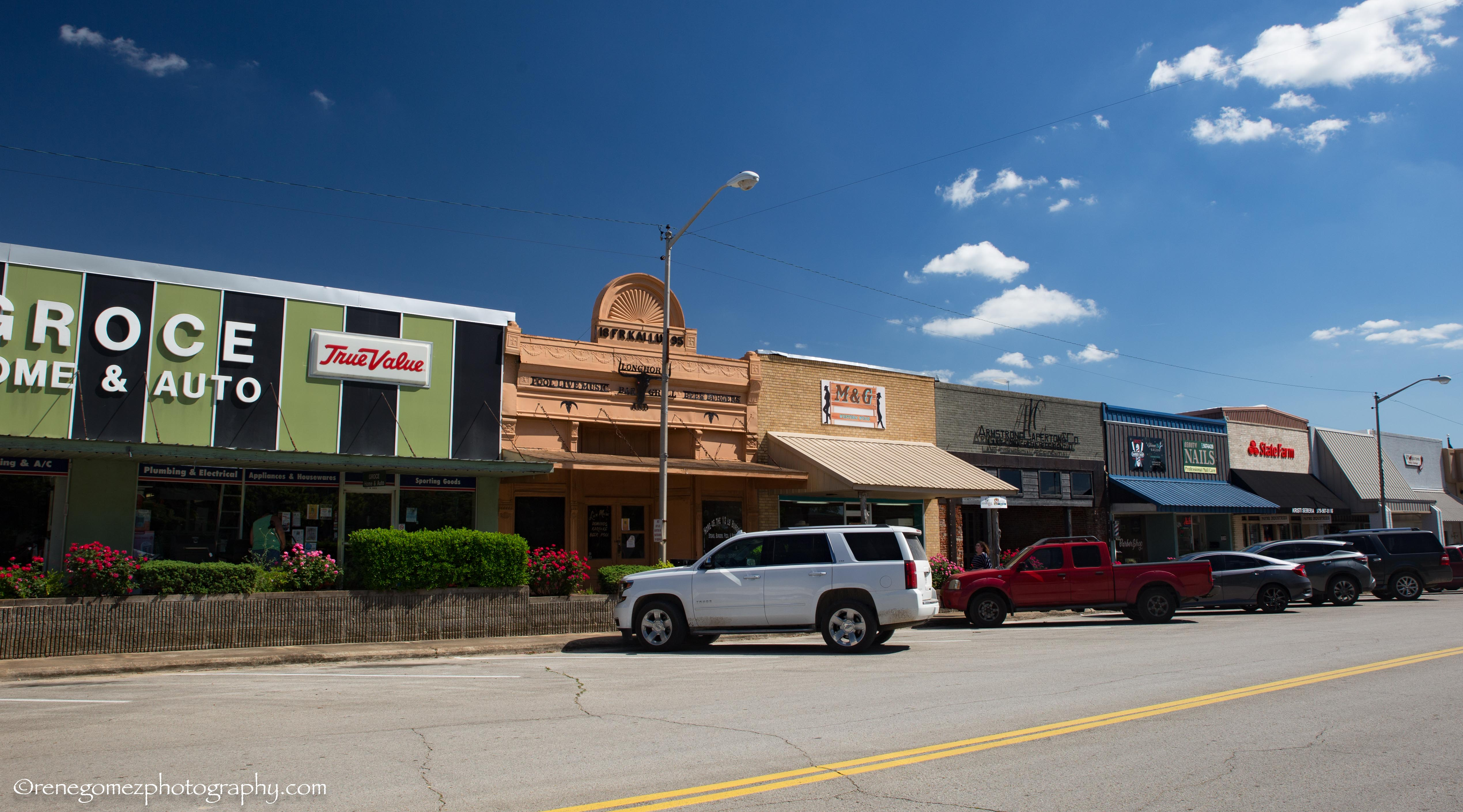
- Downtown Caldwell
- Nicknames: The Kolache Capital of Texas; The Big Grape
- Motto: "Preparing for the Future with Respect for the Past"
- Interactive map of Caldwell, Texas
- Coordinates: 30°31′53″N 96°41′58″W
- Country: United States
- State: Texas
- County: Burleson

Area
  - Total: 3.92 sq mi (10.16 km^{2})
  - Land: 3.90 sq mi (10.10 km^{2})
  - Water: 0.027 sq mi (0.07 km^{2})
- Elevation: 387 ft (118 m)

Population (2020)
  - Total: 3,993
  - Density: 1,121.9/sq mi (433.18/km^{2})
- Time zone: UTC-6 (CST)
  - Summer (DST): UTC-5 (CDT)
- ZIP code: 77836
- Area code: 979
- FIPS code: 48-11836
- GNIS feature ID: 2409957
- Website: www.caldwelltx.gov

Caldwell is a city in and the county seat of Burleson County, Texas, United States. The population was 3,993 at the 2020 census. It is part of the Bryan-College Station metropolitan area.

== Geography ==
Caldwell is located northwest of the center of Burleson County. Texas State Highway 21 passes through the center of the city, leading northeast 23 miles (37 km) to Bryan and southwest 50 miles (80 km) to Bastrop. Texas State Highway 36 bypasses the center of the city to the northeast, leading northwest 16 miles (26 km) to Milano and southeast 32 miles (51 km) to Brenham.

According to the United States Census Bureau, Caldwell has a total area of 3.9 square miles (10.2 km^{2}), of which 0.03 square miles (0.07 km^{2}), or 0.66%, is water.

== Demographics ==
Historical population
Census	Pop.	Note	%±
1880	301		—
1890	1,250		315.3%
1900	1,585		26.8%
1910	1,476		−6.9%
1920	1,689		14.4%
1930	1,724		2.1%
1940	2,165		25.6%
1950	2,109		−2.6%
1960	2,204		4.5%
1970	2,308		4.7%
1980	2,953		27.9%
1990	3,181		7.7%
2000	3,449		8.4%
2010	4,104		19.0%
2020	3,993		−2.7%
U.S. Decennial Census; 1850–1900 1910; 1920 1930 1940; 1950 1960 1970; 1980 1990 2000; 2010

=== 2020 census ===
As of the 2020 census, Caldwell had a population of 3,993. The median age was 39.7 years. 24.7% of residents were under the age of 18 and 20.2% of residents were 65 years of age or older. For every 100 females there were 90.6 males, and for every 100 females age 18 and over there were 86.0 males age 18 and over.

0% of residents lived in urban areas, while 100.0% lived in rural areas.

There were 1,527 households in Caldwell, of which 35.4% had children under the age of 18 living in them. Of all households, 46.0% were married-couple households, 16.8% were households with a male householder and no spouse or partner present, and 31.8% were households with a female householder and no spouse or partner present. About 28.7% of all households were made up of individuals and 13.1% had someone living alone who was 65 years of age or older.

There were 1,675 housing units, of which 8.8% were vacant. Among occupied housing units, 61.4% were owner-occupied and 38.6% were renter-occupied. The homeowner vacancy rate was 1.7% and the rental vacancy rate was 4.5%.

Racial composition as of the 2020 census
Race	Percent
White	61.0%
Black or African American	12.9%
American Indian and Alaska Native	0.6%
Asian	0.6%
Native Hawaiian and Other Pacific Islander	0%
Some other race	10.4%
Two or more races	14.5%
Hispanic or Latino (of any race)	31.4%

=== 2000 census ===
As of the 2000 census, there were 3,449 people, 1,322 households, and 938 families residing in the city. The population density was 1,021.4 inhabitants per square mile (394.4/km^{2}). There were 1,485 housing units at an average density of 439.8 per square mile (169.8/km^{2}). The racial makeup of the city was 71.24% White, 12.64% African American, 0.17% Native American, 0.09% Asian, 13.71% from other races, and 2.15% from two or more races. Hispanic or Latino of any race were 22.96% of the population.

There were 1,322 households, out of which 36.5% had children under the age of 18 living with them, 52.5% were married couples living together, 14.1% had a female householder with no husband present, and 29.0% were non-families. 26.3% of all households were made up of individuals, and 15.8% had someone living alone who was 65 years of age or older. The average household size was 2.61 and the average family size was 3.16.

In the city, the population was spread out, with 28.8% under the age of 18, 9.5% from 18 to 24, 26.7% from 25 to 44, 20.5% from 45 to 64, and 14.5% who were 65 years of age or older. The median age was 34 years. For every 100 females, there were 87.0 males. For every 100 females age 18 and over, there were 83.2 males.

The median income for a household in the city was $29,936, and the median income for a family was $37,658. Males had a median income of $25,745 versus $20,306 for females. The per capita income for the city was $14,141. About 14.2% of families and 17.9% of the population were below the poverty line, including 21.0% of those under age 18 and 12.2% of those age 65 or over.

== Climate ==
The climate in this area is characterized by hot, humid summers and generally mild to cool winters. According to the Köppen Climate Classification system, Caldwell has a humid subtropical climate, abbreviated "Cfa" on climate maps.

== Education ==
Caldwell is served by the Caldwell Independent School District.

== Notable people ==
- Mel Deutsch, former Major League Baseball player
- Alfred Jackson, former NFL Football player
- Charlie Krueger, former NFL Football player

== Photo gallery ==
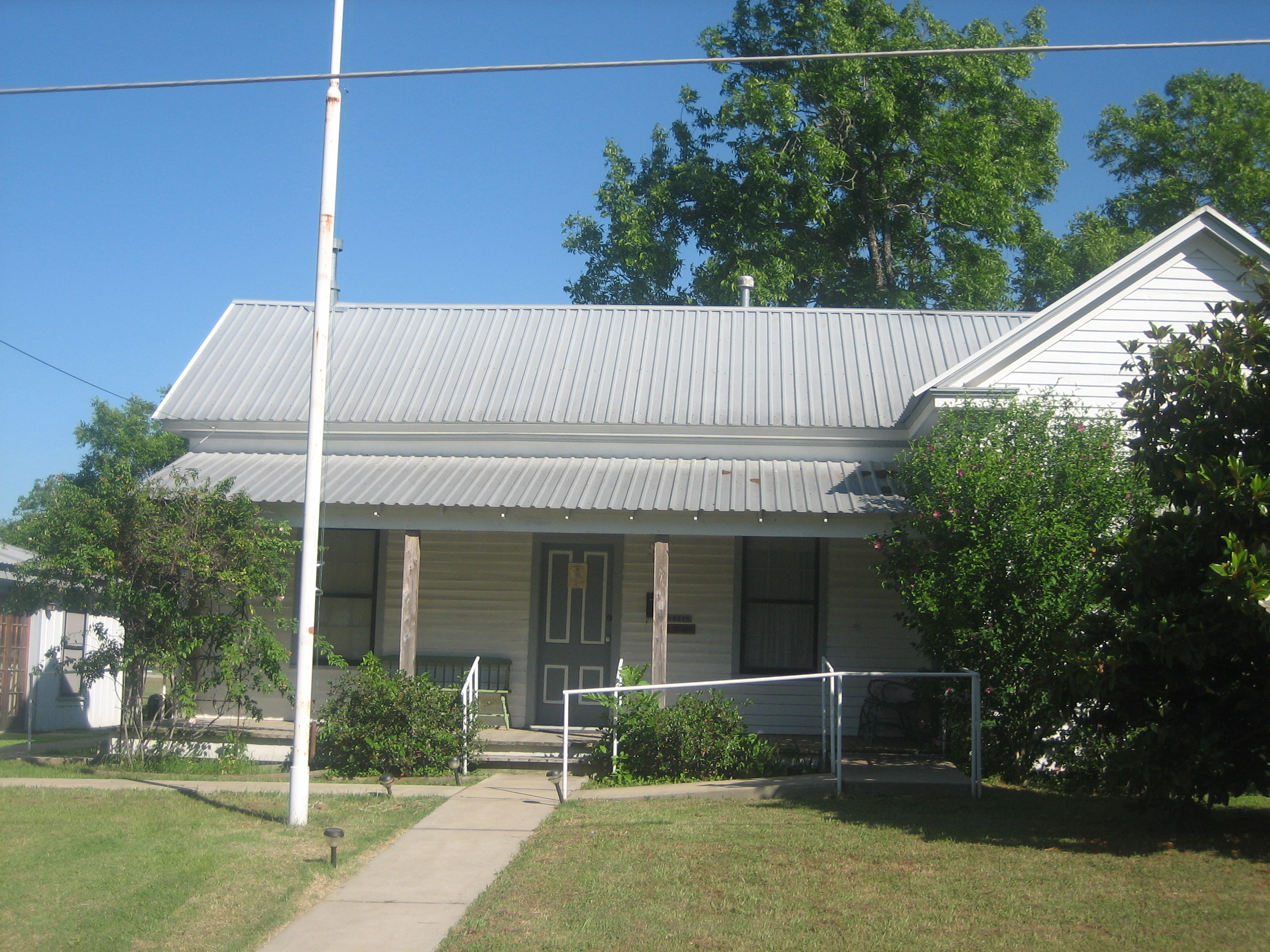
Czech Museum in Caldwell

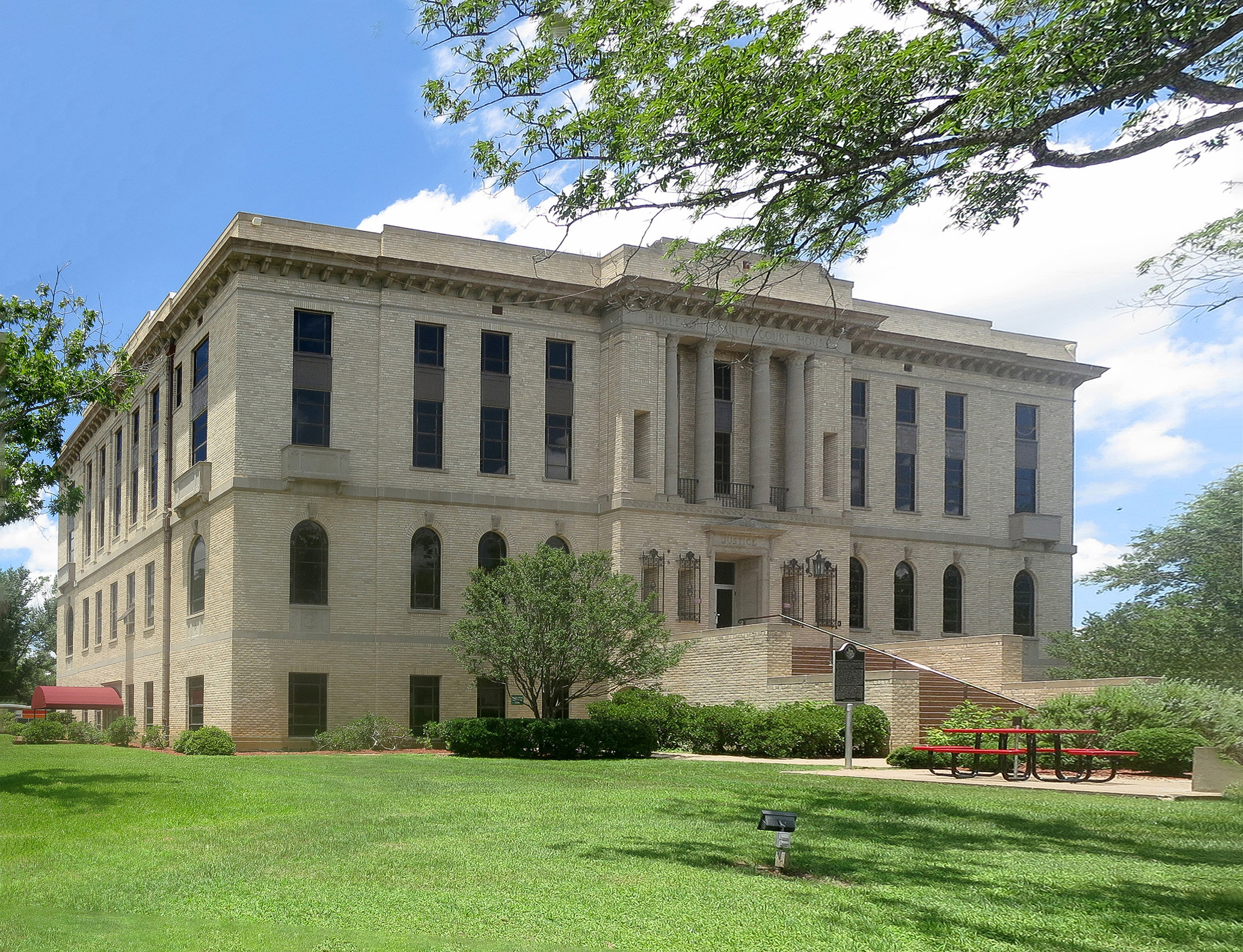
Burleson County courthouse

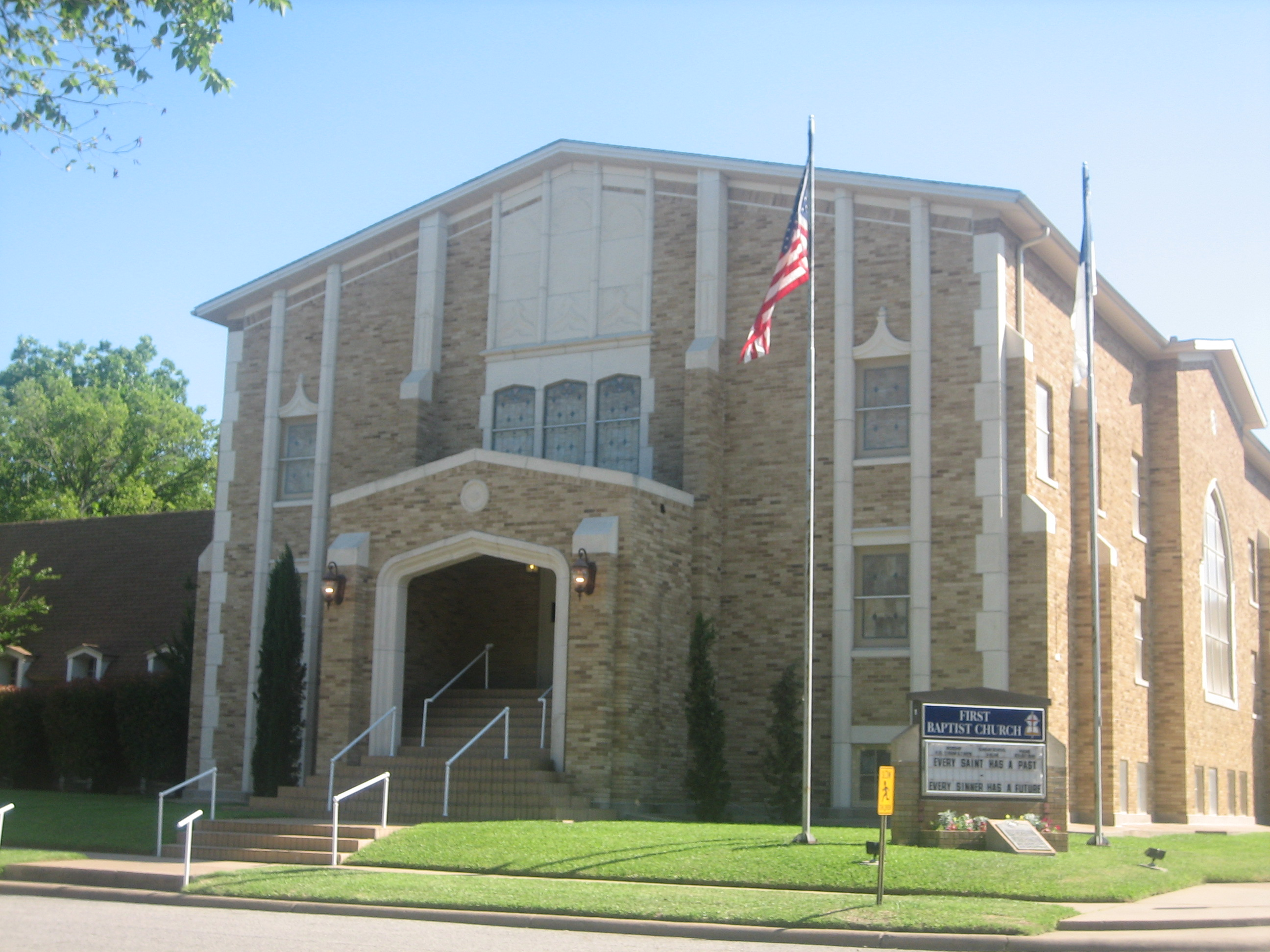
The First Baptist Church is located in a residential area at 501 West Mustang Street in Caldwell.

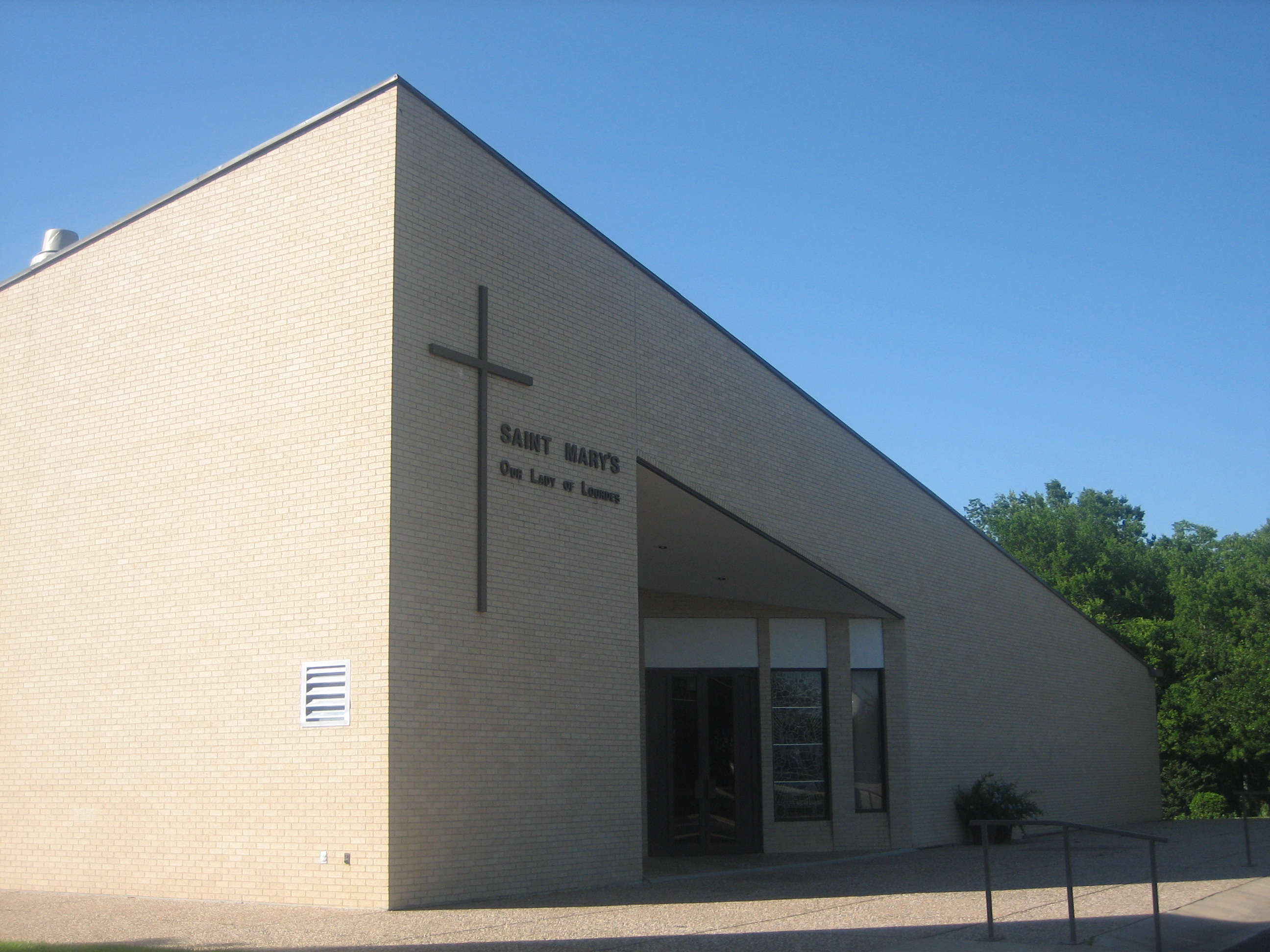
St. Mary's Catholic Church in Caldwell

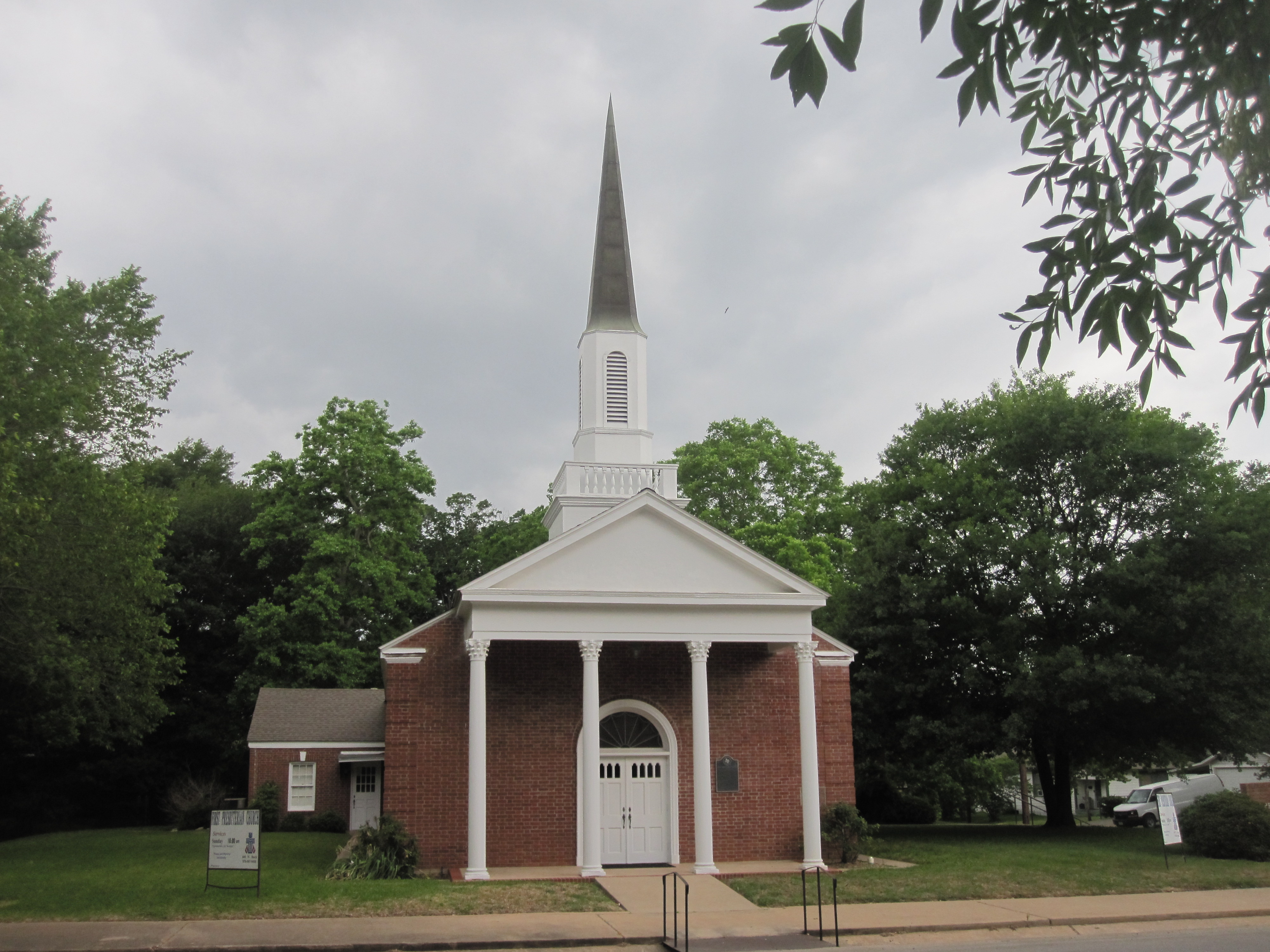
Historic First Presbyterian Church at 600 West Buck Street in Caldwell was first organized in the early 1840s by the Reverend Hugh Wilson.

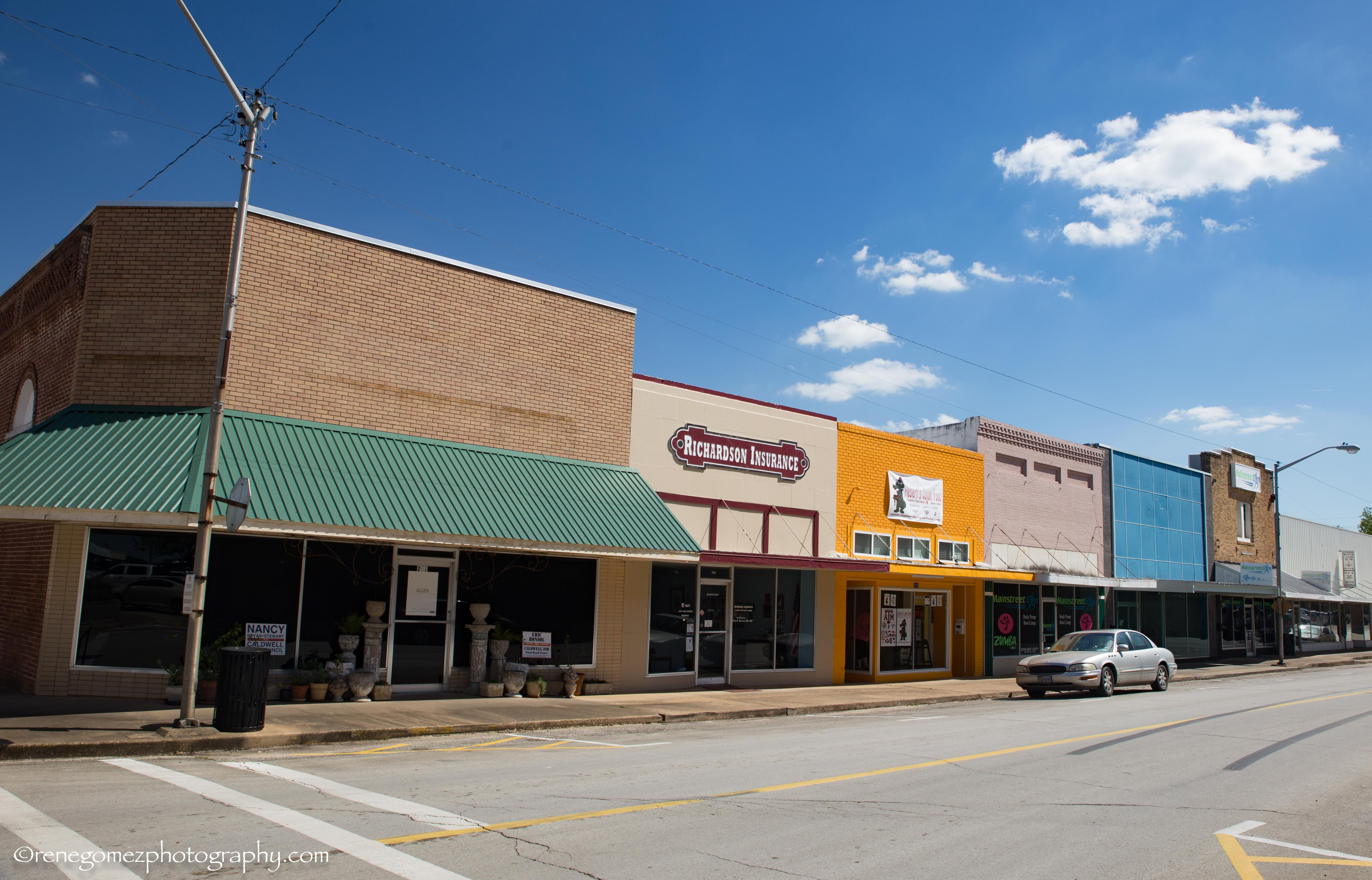
Downtown Caldwell
