= Moon tree =

Tree grown from seed carried on Apollo 14 or Artemis I

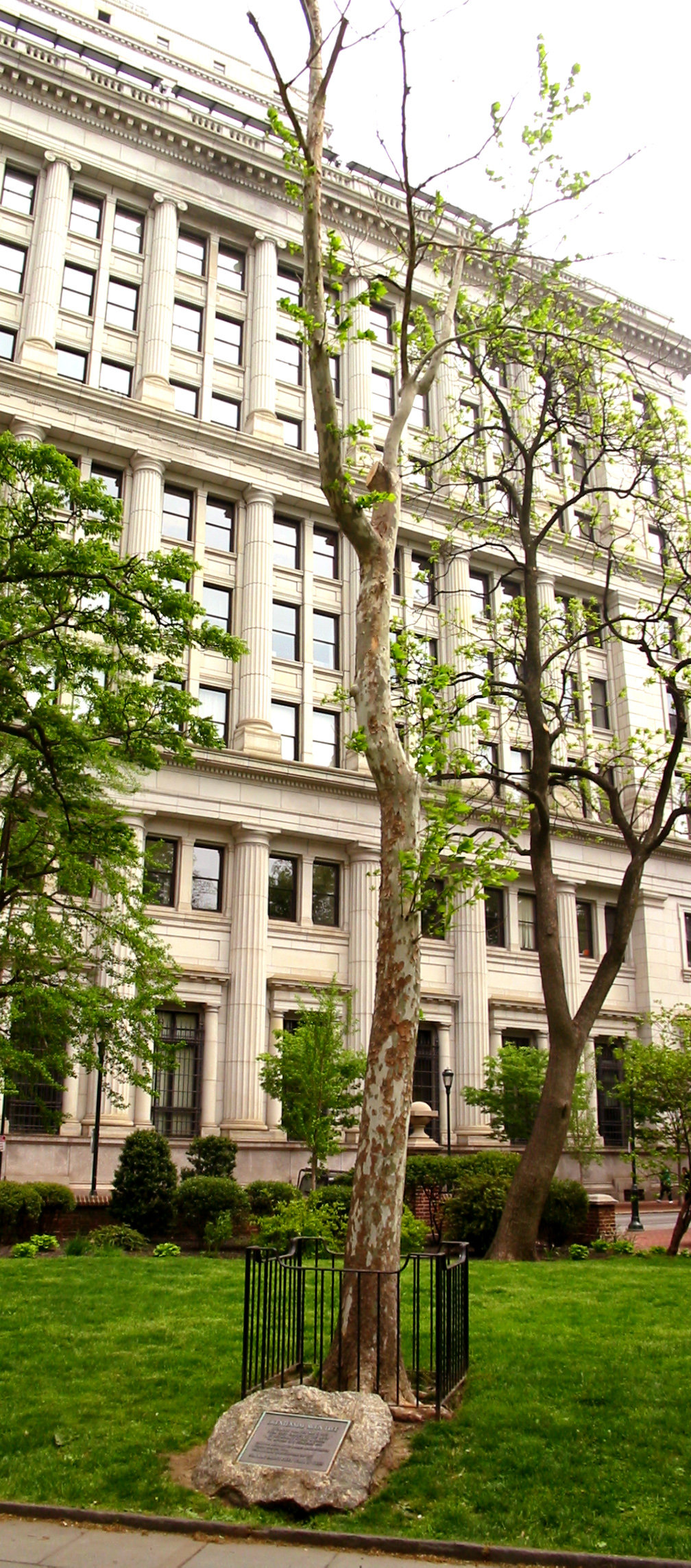
Bicentennial Moon Tree, planted in 1975 in Washington Square, Philadelphia

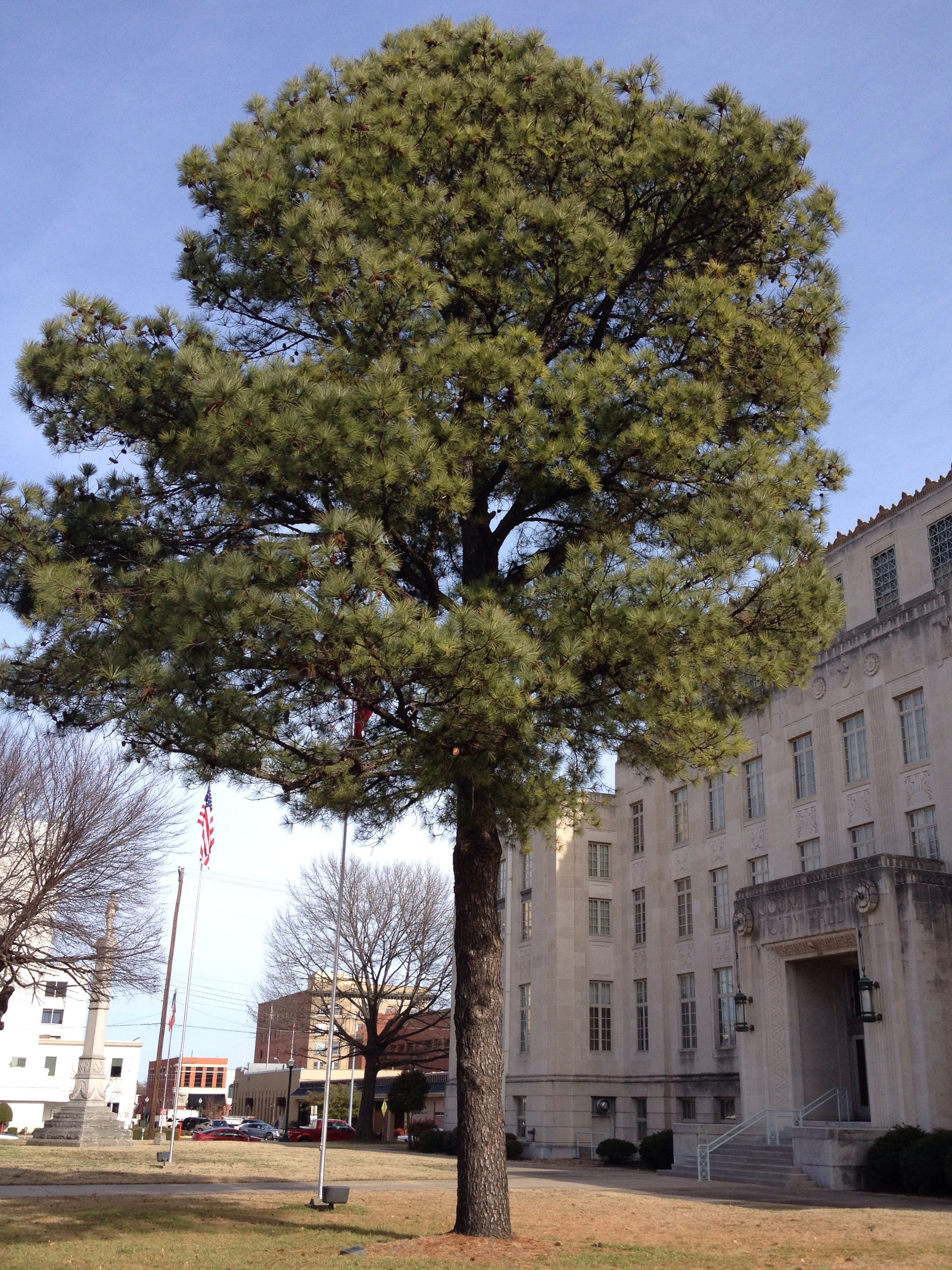
Moon Tree in front of Sebastian County Courthouse, in Fort Smith, Arkansas

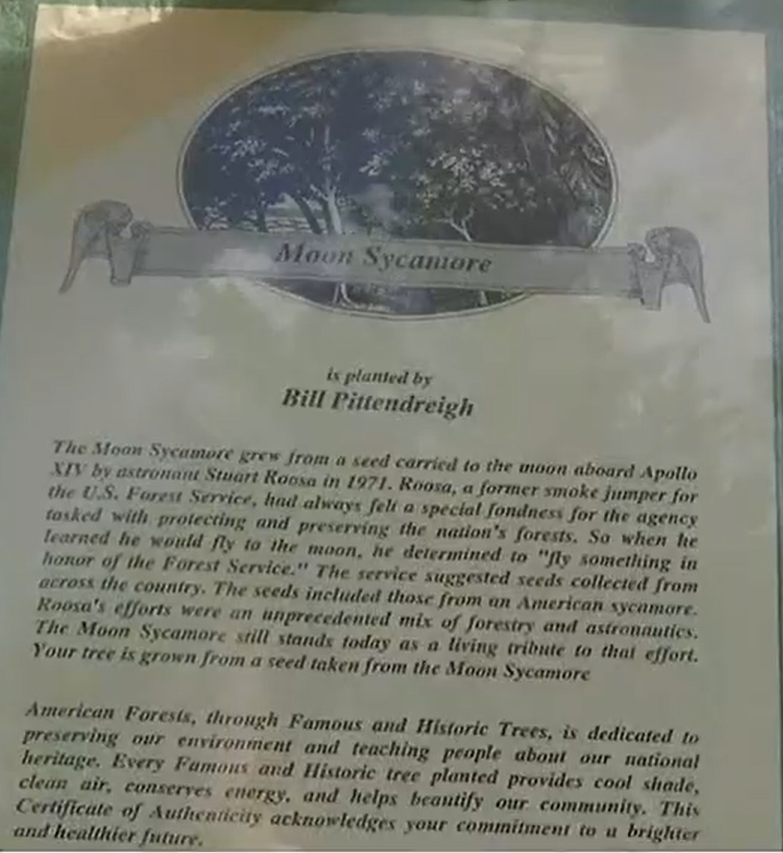
Certificate of Authenticity of the Moon Tree in Piedmont, South Carolina.

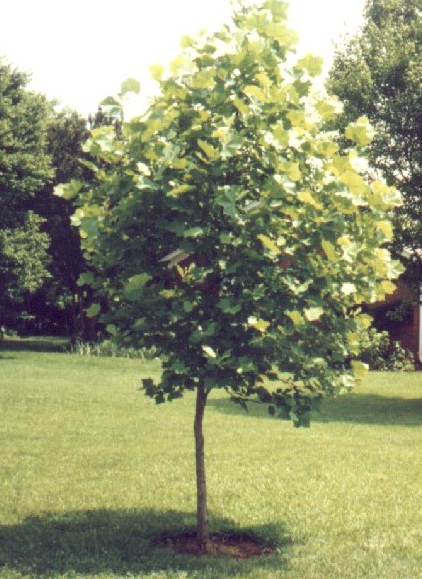
Moon Tree in Piedmont, South Carolina, 1980s

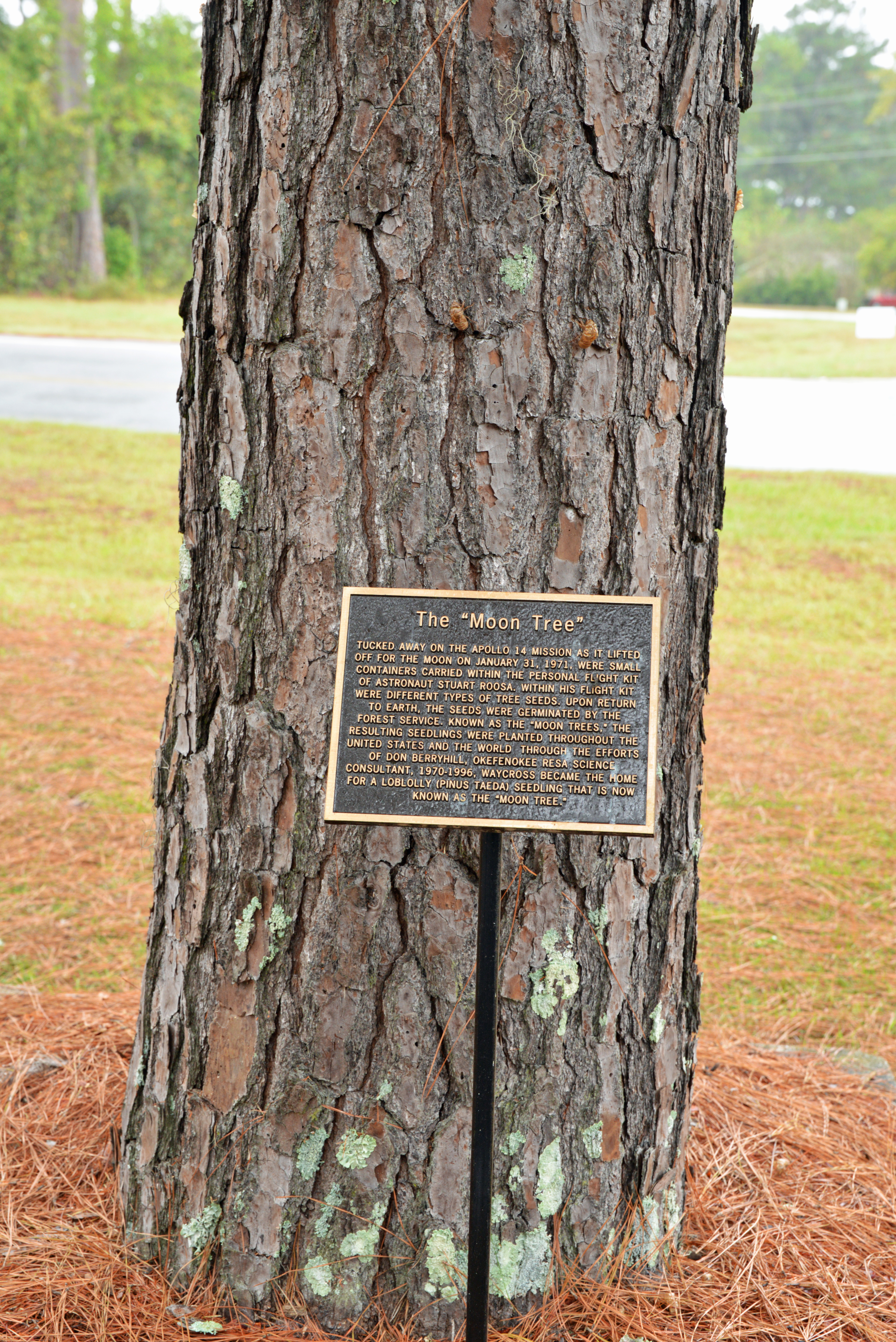
Moon Tree, Waycross, Georgia

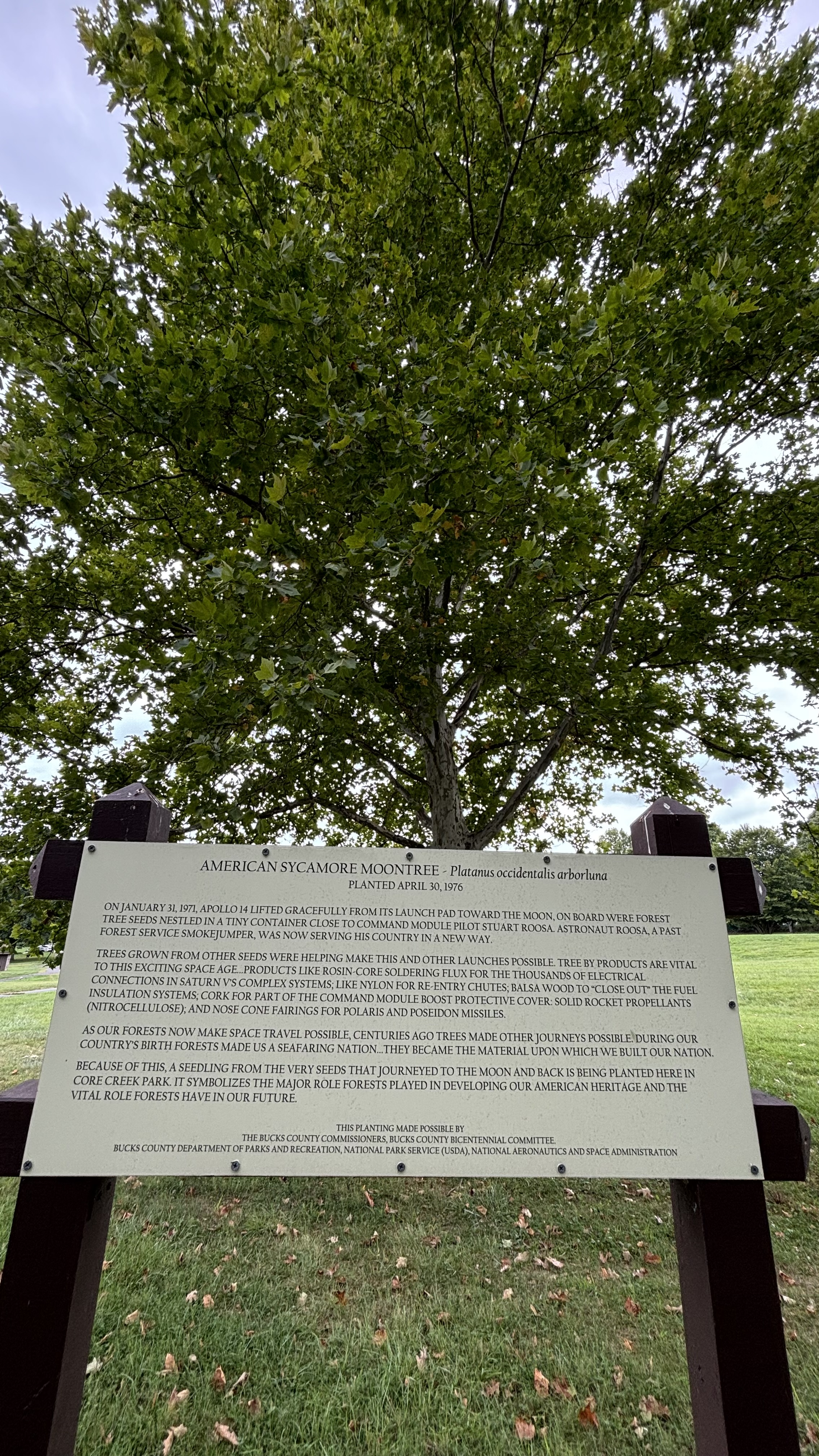
Sycamore Moon Tree, planted in 1976 at Core Creek Park, Bucks County, Pennsylvania

Moon trees are trees grown from seeds taken into orbit around the Moon, initially by Apollo 14 in 1971, and later by Artemis I in 2022. The idea was first proposed by Edward P. Cliff, then the chief of the United States Forest Service, who convinced Stuart Roosa, the Command Module Pilot on the Apollo 14 mission, to bring a small canister containing about 500 seeds aboard the module in 1971. Seeds for the experiment were chosen from five species of tree: loblolly pine, sycamore, sweetgum, redwood, and Douglas fir. In 2022, NASA announced it would be reviving the Moon tree program by carrying 1,000 seeds aboard Artemis I.

== History ==
After the flight, the seeds were sent to the southern Forest Service station in Gulfport, Mississippi, and to the western station in Placerville, California, with the intent to germinate them. Nearly all the seeds germinated successfully, and after a few years, the Forest Service had about 420 seedlings. Some of these were planted alongside their Earth-bound counterparts, which were specifically set aside as controls. After more than 40 years, there was no discernible difference between the two classes of trees. Most of the Moon trees were given away in 1975 and 1976 to state forestry organizations, in order to be planted as part of the nation's bicentennial celebration. Since the trees were all of southern or western species, not all states received trees. A Loblolly Pine was planted at the White House, and trees were planted in Brazil, Switzerland, and presented to Emperor Hirohito, among others.

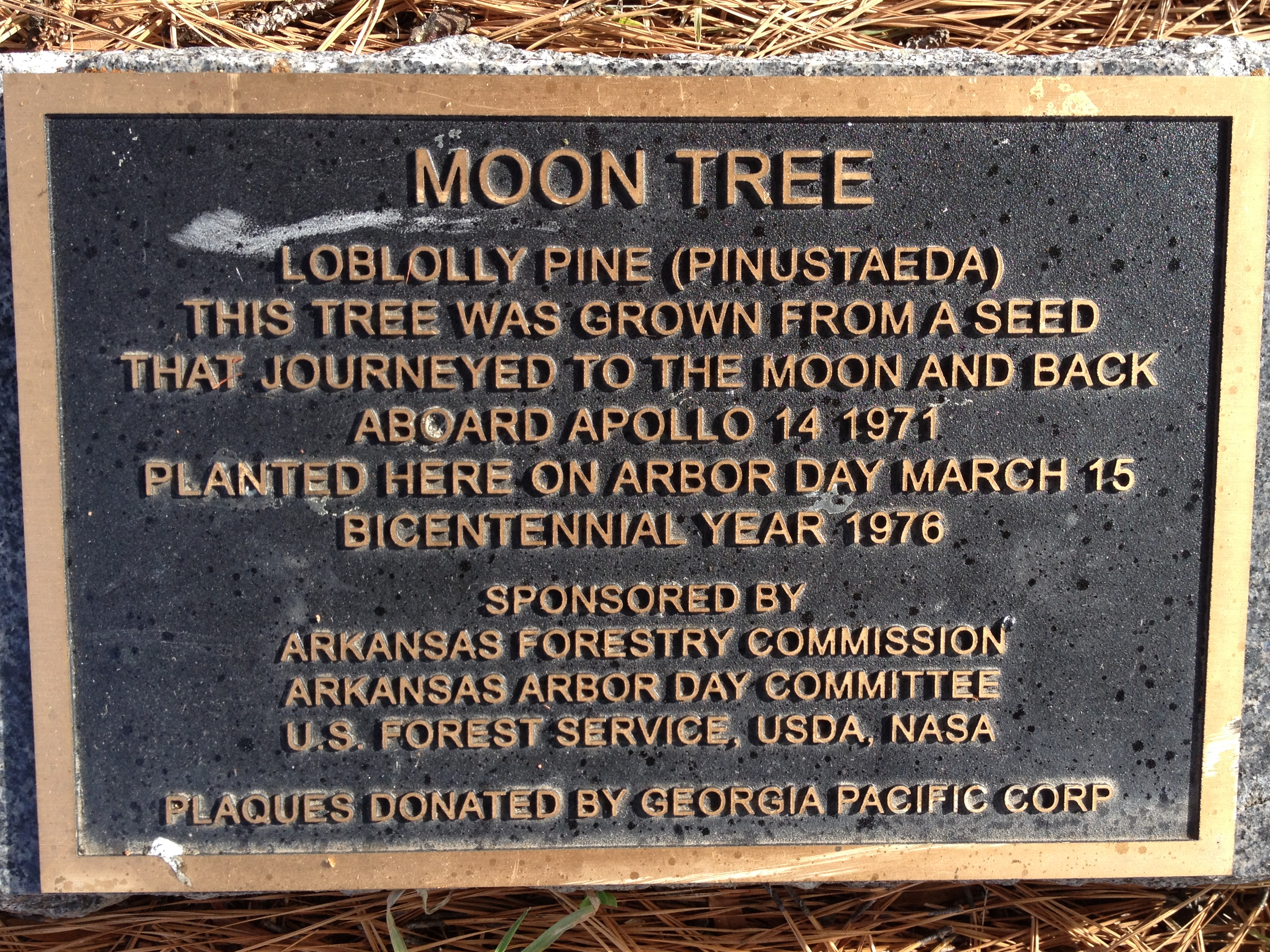
Plaque at the base of the Fort Smith Moon Tree.

The locations of many of the trees that were planted from these seeds were largely unknown for decades. In 1996, a third-grade teacher, Joan Goble, and her students found a tree in their local area with a plaque identifying it as a Moon tree. Goble sent an email to NASA, and reached employee Dave Williams. Williams was unaware of the trees' existence, as were most of his colleagues at NASA. Upon doing some research, Williams found some old newspaper clippings that described the initial actions taken by Roosa to bring these seeds to space and home to be planted.

Williams posted a page on NASA's official website asking for public help to find the trees. The page also contained a table listing the locations and species of known Moon trees. Williams began to hear from people around the United States who had seen trees with plaques identifying them as Moon trees. Williams began to manage a database listing details about such trees, including their location and species. In 2011, an article in Wired magazine described the effort, and provided Williams' email address, encouraging anyone to write who might have data on existing Moon trees. As of 2022, efforts were continuing to identify and locate existing trees; the NASA page remains active.

In March 2021, the Royal Astronomical Society and the UK Space Agency asked for the help of the public to identify up to 15 Moon Trees that may be growing in the United Kingdom. As of April 2021, none of the trees that supposedly came to the UK have been identified.

=== Current efforts ===
The Moon Tree Foundation is an organization run by Roosa's daughter, Rosemary, which seeks to plant Moon trees in regions around the world. The foundation sponsors and hosts ceremonies to plant new trees, with seeds produced by the original generation of trees that grew from the seeds carried by Roosa in 1971.

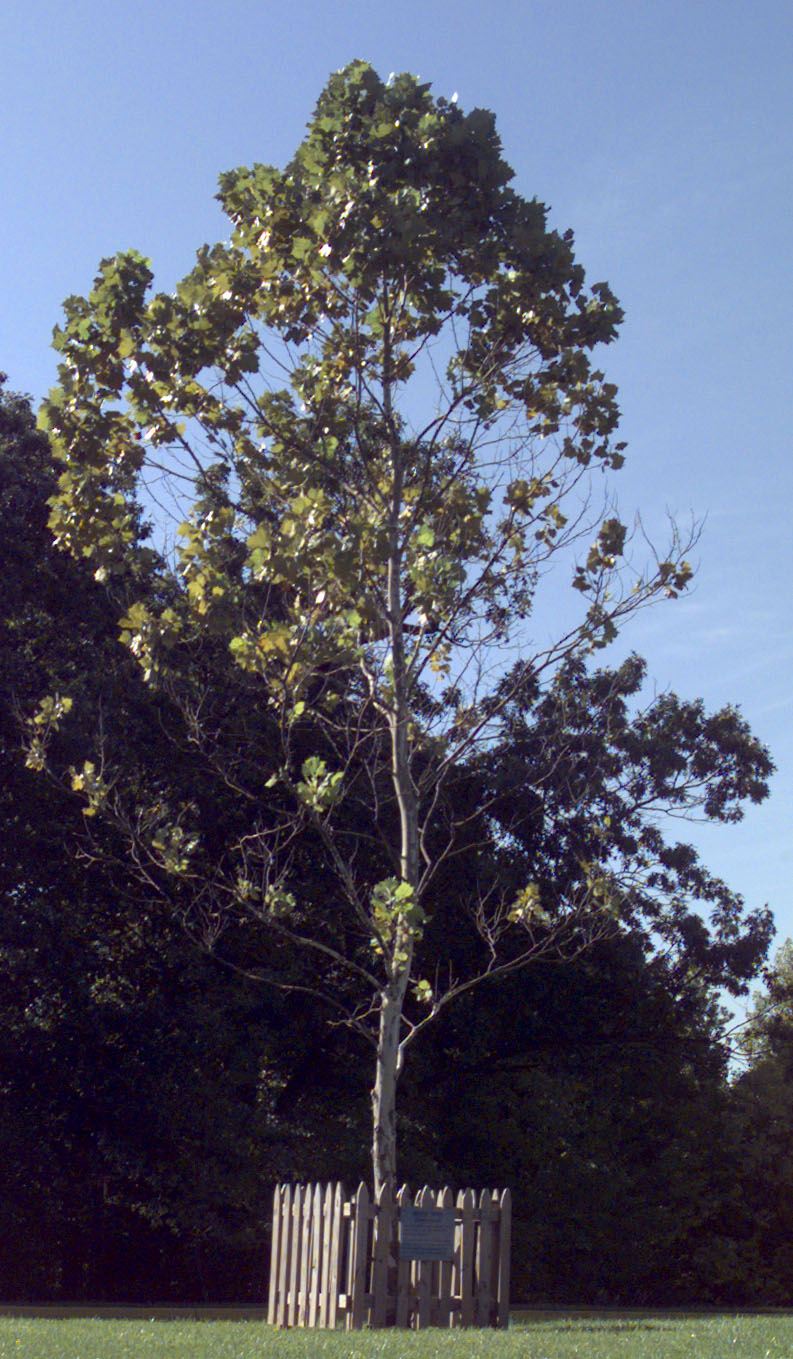
Moon tree at the Goddard Space Flight Center

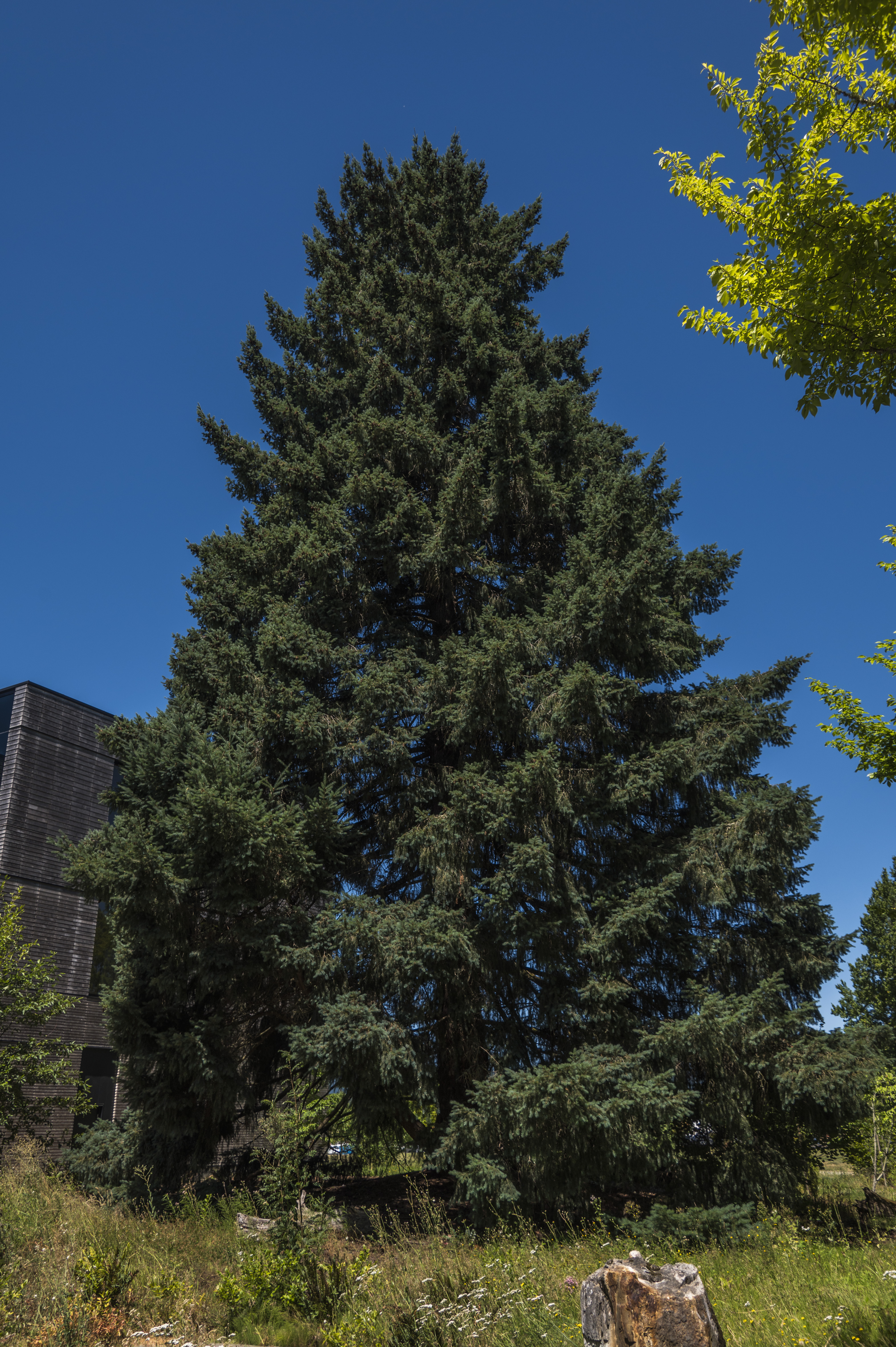
Moon tree at Oregon State University

== Locations ==
=== Apollo Moon Trees ===
Table key
†	Indicates a tree that is no longer alive.
‡	Indicates the exact date of planting is unknown.

==== United States ====
City	State	Location	Species	Date planted	Ref.
Salem	Oregon	Private Residence	2 Douglas Firs	1973 ‡	
Wiggins	Mississippi	Girl Scouts Camp Iti Kana	Sycamore	1974 ‡	
Starkville	Mississippi	Dorman Hall, Mississippi State University	Sycamore	1975 ‡	
Philadelphia	Pennsylvania	Washington Square Park	Sycamore †	May 6, 1975	
Bethesda	Maryland	Society of American Foresters	Loblolly Pine	September 30, 1975	
Princeton	West Virginia	USDA Forestry Sciences Laboratory	Sycamore	October 18, 1975	
Fort Smith	Arkansas	Sebastian County Courthouse	Loblolly Pine	March 15, 1976	
Little Rock	Arkansas	Forestry Commission Headquarters	Loblolly Pine †	March 15, 1976	
Monticello	Arkansas	University of Arkansas at Monticello	Loblolly Pine †	March 15, 1976	
Washington	Arkansas	Historic Washington State Park	Loblolly Pine	March 15, 1976	
Asheville	North Carolina	Botanical Gardens at Asheville	Sycamore	March 19, 1976	
College Station	Texas	D. A. "Andy" Anderson Arboretum	Sycamore †	March 21, 1976	
Birmingham	Alabama	Birmingham Botanical Gardens, near Lane Park	Sycamore	April 1976 ‡	
Montgomery	Alabama	Alabama State Capitol Building	Loblolly Pine	April 1976 ‡	
North Pembroke	Massachusetts	Pembroke Historical Society	Sycamore †	April 1976 ‡	
Elmer	Louisiana	Palustris Experiment Station, Kisatchie National Forest	Loblolly Pine	April 1976 ‡	
Knoxville	Tennessee	Forestry Experiment Station, University of Tennessee	Loblolly Pine	April 1976 ‡	
Sewanee	Tennessee	Woods Laboratories, University of the South	Sycamore	April 1976 ‡	
Elizabethton	Tennessee	Fort Watauga, Sycamore Shoals State Historic Area	Sycamore †	April 1976 ‡	
Tullahoma	Tennessee	Arnold Air Force Base	Loblolly Pine †	April 1976 ‡	
Olympia	Washington	Washington State Capitol Building	Douglas Fir	April 1976 ‡	
Albuquerque	New Mexico	Harry E. Kinney Civic Plaza	Douglas Fir †	April 7, 1976	
Indianapolis	Indiana	Indiana Statehouse	Sycamore	April 9, 1976	
Sacramento	California	California State Capitol Building	Redwood	April 21, 1976	
Lansing	Michigan	Michigan State Capitol Building	Sycamore †	April 22, 1976	
Wyoming	Michigan	Wyoming Police Department	Sycamore †	April 23, 1976	
Niles	Michigan	Fernwood Botanical Gardens and Nature Preserve	Sycamore	April 23, 1976	
Salt Lake City	Utah	Utah State Capitol Building	Douglas Fir †	April 28, 1976	
Flagstaff	Arizona	Frances Short Pond, formerly Flagstaff Junior High School	Douglas Fir †	April 30, 1976	
Tucson	Arizona	Kuiper Space Sciences Building, University of Arizona	Sycamore	April 30, 1976	
Des Moines	Iowa	Iowa State Capitol Building	Sycamore	April 30, 1976	
Middletown	Pennsylvania	Core Creek Park	Sycamore	April 30, 1976	
Salem	Oregon	Oregon State Capitol Building	Douglas Fir	April 30, 1976	
Hampton	Virginia	Albert W. Patrick III, Elementary School	Sycamore	April 30, 1976	
Arcata	California	California State Polytechnic University, Humboldt	3 Redwoods	May 1976 ‡	
Athens	Georgia	Athens-Clarke County Planning Department	Loblolly Pine	May 1976 ‡	
Lincoln City	Indiana	Lincoln State Park	Sycamore	May 1, 1976	
Roseburg	Oregon	Roseburg Veteran Affairs Medical Center	Douglas Fir	May 3, 1976	
Hollidaysburg	Pennsylvania	Highland Hall	Sycamore	May 5, 1976	
Boise	Idaho	Idaho State Capitol Building	Douglas Fir †	May 7, 1976	
Capitan	New Mexico	Smokey Bear State Park	Sycamore †	May 15, 1976	
Topton	Pennsylvania	Borough Hall	Sycamore	June 20, 1976	
Cape Canaveral	Florida	Kennedy Space Center	Sycamore †	June 25, 1976	
Ebensburg	Pennsylvania	Cambria County Courthouse	Sycamore	June 29, 1976	
King of Prussia	Pennsylvania	Lockheed Martin Space Systems Building	Sycamore	June 30, 1976	
Missoula	Montana	University Center Mall, University of Montana	Douglas Fir	July 17, 1976	
New Orleans	Louisiana	NASA Michoud Assembly Facility	Loblolly Pine †	July 20, 1976	
Santa Fe	New Mexico	New Mexico State Capitol Building	Douglas Fir	July 22, 1976	
Atchison	Kansas	International Forest of Friendship	Sycamore	July 24, 1976	
Berkeley	California	Northwest area of Tilden Nature Area	2 Redwoods	July 26, 1976	
Monterey	California	Friendly Plaza, near Colton Hall	Redwood	July 27, 1976	
Steubenville	Ohio	Friendship Park	Sycamore	July 29, 1976	
San Luis Obispo	California	Mission Plaza	Redwood	July 30, 1976	
Troy	Alabama	Pioneer Museum of Alabama	Loblolly Pine	August 5, 1976	
Silver City	New Mexico	Gough Park	Sycamore	August 14, 1976	
Alamogordo	New Mexico	New Mexico Museum of Space History	Sycamore †	October 5, 1976	
Brevard	North Carolina	Cradle of Forestry, Pisgah National Forest	Sycamore	October 18, 1976	
Tuscumbia	Alabama	Ivy Green, historic monument and birthplace of Helen Keller	Loblolly Pine	October 19, 1976	
Auburn	Alabama	G.W. Andrews Forestry Sciences Lab, Auburn University	Loblolly Pine †	October 22, 1976	
Huntsville	Alabama	U.S. Space and Rocket Center	5 Sycamores, 2 Pines *	October 29, 1976	
Tuskegee	Alabama	Veteran Affairs Hospital (CAVHCS)	Loblolly Pine †	1976 ‡	
El Dorado Hills	California	St. Stephen's Lutheran Church	Redwood †	1976 ‡	
Tallahassee	Florida	Florida Department of Agriculture	Loblolly Pine	1976 ‡	
Waycross	Georgia	Okefenokee Regional Educational Service Agency	Loblolly Pine	1976 ‡	
Cannelton	Indiana	Girl Scouts Camp Koch	Sycamore	1976 ‡	
Tell City	Indiana	Hoosier National Forest Service Office	2 Sweetgums	1976 ‡	
Monmouth	New Jersey	Monmouth County Courthouse	Sycamore †	1976 ‡	
Clyde	North Carolina	Disc Golf Course, Haywood Community College	Sycamore	1976 ‡	
Draper	Utah	Lone Peak Conservation Center	Sycamore	1976 ‡	
Columbus	Ohio	Franklin Park Conservatory	Sycamore †	1976 ‡	
Corvallis	Oregon	Peavy Hall, Oregon State University	Douglas Fir	1976 ‡	
Cave Junction	Oregon	Siskiyou Smokejumper Base, Illinois Valley Airport	Douglas Fir †	1976 ‡	
Eugene	Oregon	Erb Memorial Union, University of Oregon	Douglas Fir	1976 ‡	
Doswell	Virginia	Kings Dominion Amusement Park	2 Sycamores (1 dead)	1976 ‡	
Washington, D.C.	District of Columbia	Rose Garden, White House	Loblolly Pine †	January 19, 1977	
San Dimas	California	San Dimas Technology and Development Center	Redwood	March 29, 1977	
Gainesville	Florida	University of Florida	Sycamore	1977 ‡	
Boise	Idaho	Lowell Elementary School	Loblolly Pine	1977 ‡	
Greenbelt	Maryland	Goddard Space Flight Center	Sycamore	June 9, 1977	
Perry	Florida	Forest Capital Museum State Park	Loblolly Pine	April 29, 1978	
Hamilton	Virginia	Scott Jenkins Memorial Park	Sweetgum	September 1978 ‡	
Westlake	Texas	Private Residence	Sycamore	1978 ‡	
Lockeford	California	Lockeford Plant Materials Center	Redwood	1979 ‡	
Holliston	Massachusetts	Holliston Police Station	Sycamore	1982 ‡	
Dillsburg	Pennsylvania	Dillsburg Elementary School	Sycamore	April 29, 1983	
New Orleans	Louisiana	New Orleans River Walk	Loblolly Pine †	June 1983 ‡	
Keystone Heights	Florida	Keystone Heights Library	Sycamore	1984 ‡	
Plano	Texas	Plano Senior High School	Sycamore †	November 4, 2009	
Tallahassee	Florida	Cascades Park	Sycamore	Unknown ‡	
Moscow	Idaho	Administration Building, University of Idaho	Sycamore †	Unknown ‡	
Waynesboro	Mississippi	Forestry Commission Nursery	Sycamore	Unknown ‡	
De Soto	Missouri	Walther Park	Sycamore	Unknown ‡	
Elkton	Oregon	D.L. Phipps State Forest Nursery	Douglas Fir	Unknown ‡	
Coudersport	Pennsylvania	Coudersport Area Recreational Park	Sycamore	Unknown ‡	
Piedmont	South Carolina	Private Residence	Sycamore	Unknown ‡	
Austin	Texas	Private Residence	Sycamore	Unknown ‡	

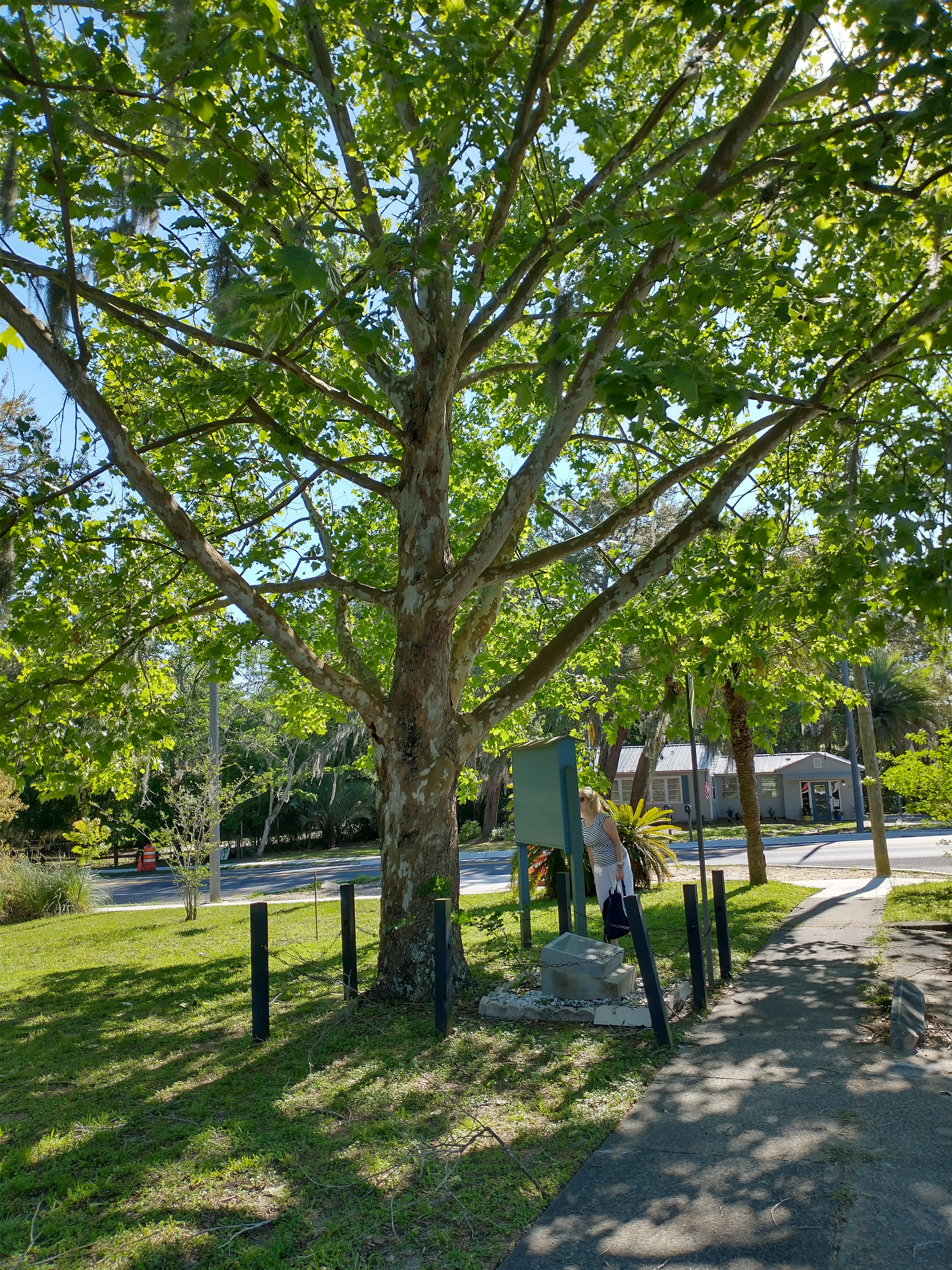
A Moon Tree in Keystone Heights, Florida

==== Other countries ====
City	Country	Location	Species	Date planted	Ref.
Brasília	Brazil	Institute for Environment and Natural Renewable Resources	Sweetgum	January 14, 1980	
Santa Rosa	Brazil	Soybean Fairgrounds, Parque Municipal de Exposições	Redwood	August 18, 1981	
Cambará do Sul	Brazil	St. Joseph Central Square	Redwood	September 26, 1982	

=== Artemis Moon Trees ===
Distribution of Artemis moon trees began in the spring of 2024.

==== United States ====
City	State	Location	Species	Date planted	Ref.
Raleigh	North Carolina	North Carolina Executive Mansion	Loblolly Pine	April 24, 2024	
Baldwinsville	New York	Baldwinsville CSD Main Campus	Sycamore	May 3, 2024	
Mount Gilead	North Carolina	Mount Gilead Community Garden	Loblolly Pine	June 3, 2024	
New Canaan	Connecticut	South Elementary School	Sycamore	April 27, 2024	
Bothell	Washington	Innovation Lab High School	Sycamore	May 6, 2024	
Shelbyville	Kentucky	Collins High School	Sycamore or Sweetgum	May 10, 2024	
New Paltz	New York	SUNY Campus	Sweetgum	May 23, 2024	
Manchester	New Hampshire	Barnstead Elementary School	Sycamore	May 24, 2024	
Tecumseh	Kansas	Tecumseh South Elementary School	Sweetgum	May 28, 2024	
Cedar Rapids	Iowa	Metro High School	Sycamore	May 30, 2024	
Cedar City	Utah	Southern Utah University	Sweetgum	May 2024	
Holladay	Utah	Salt Lake County Library Holladay branch	Douglas Fir	April 24, 2025	
Washington, D.C.	District of Columbia	U.S. Capital Building grounds	Sweetgum	June 4, 2024	
Menomonie	Wisconsin	Rassbach Museum	Sycamore	June 2024	
Green Cove Springs	Florida	UF IFAS Clay County Extension Office	Loblolly Pine	August 22, 2024	
Dana Point	California	Sea Canyon Park	Giant Sequoia	May 6, 2024	
Lake Forest	California	Santiago STEAM Magnet Elementary School	Giant Sequoia	October 2024	
Pittsburgh	Pennsylvania	Allegheny Observatory, Riverview Park	Sweetgum	October 3, 2024	
Young Harris	Georgia	Young Harris College	Loblolly Pine	October 29, 2024	
West Windsor	New Jersey	West Windsor-Plainsboro High School South	Sweetgum	2024	
Huntsville	Alabama	Monte Sano State Park	Loblolly Pine	March 20, 2025	
Boise	Idaho	Boise State University	Douglas Fir	Sep 5, 2025	
Mystic	Connecticut	Mystic Seaport Museum	Sweetgum	April 14, 2025	
Arlington	Texas	University of Texas at Arlington	Sweetgum	April 25, 2024	
Las Cruces	New Mexico	New Mexico Farm and Ranch Heritage Museum	Loblolly Pine	2024	

== See also ==
- Moon rock
- Astrobotany
- List of individual trees
