= Lynching of George Meadows =

1889 event in Jefferson County, Alabama

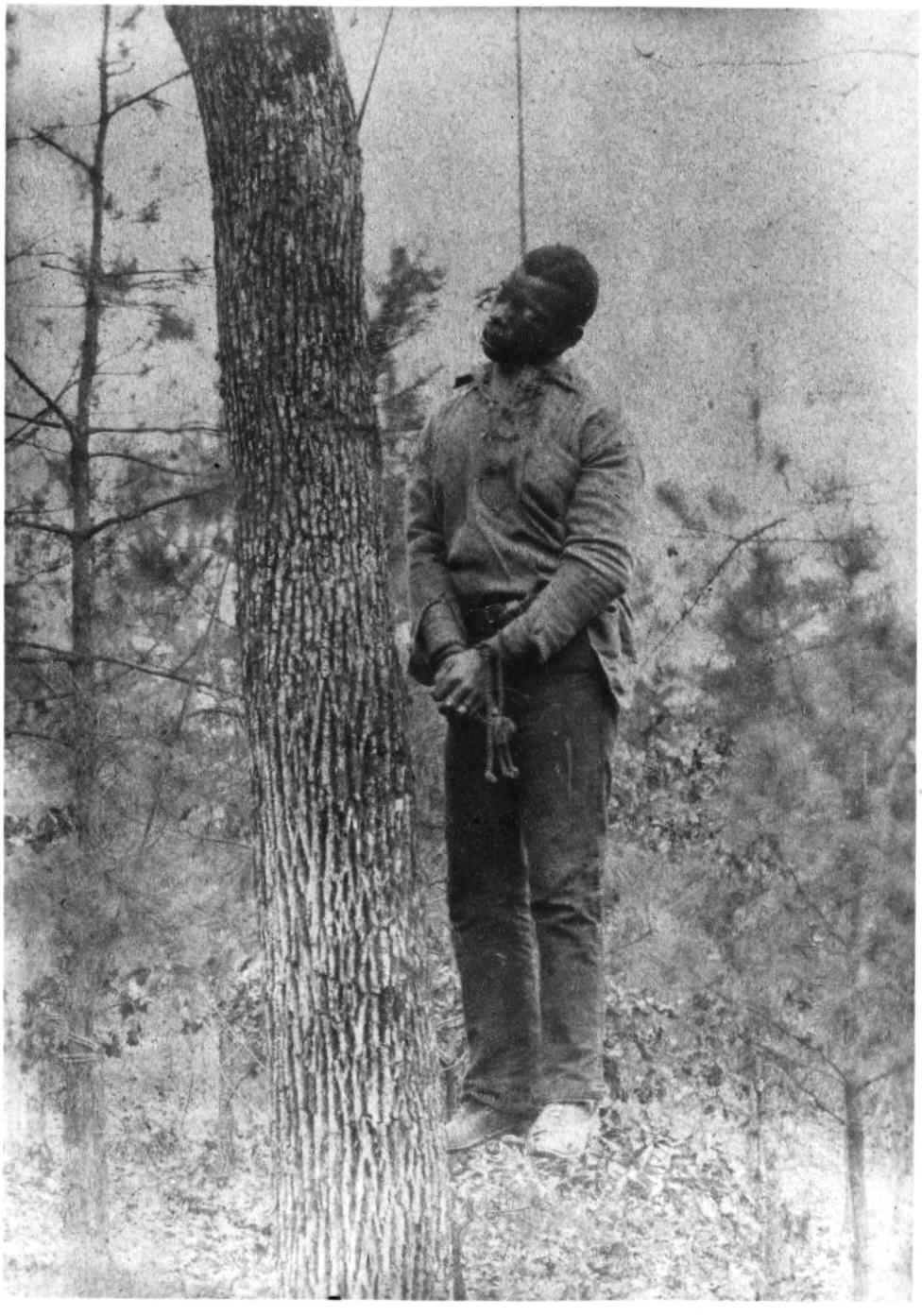
George Meadows after being lynched

George Meadows was an African American man who was lynched on January 15, 1889, in Jefferson County, Alabama, United States.

== Lynching and aftermath ==
On January 14, 1889, J. S. Kellam, a white woman, and her 9-year-old son were attacked by a black man in a nearby forest. Kellam was beaten and raped, but survived after playing dead. Her son was forced to lie down next to her and then was beaten to death.

Over 400 white coal miners formed themselves into groups and brought several black men to Kellam, who was unable to identify any of them as her possible attacker. The next day, the miners brought Meadows, a new arrival to the area, and after a brief investigation, declared him to be guilty after Kellam said that Meadows was most likely her attacker. Meadows had drawn attention to himself by constantly talking about the murder.

Kellam begged the mob not to lynch Meadows, saying she was unsure whether he was guilty. Citing his faith, her husband also asked the mob not to lynch Meadows, preferring that he stand trial instead. Nevertheless, the mob went forward with the lynching and murdered Meadows near the Pratt Mines.

Following his death, Meadows' body was shot multiple times and left in public view by an undertaker. Meadows was later buried in a paupers' grave in what is now Lane Park in Birmingham, Alabama. On January 16, the sheriff decided that Meadows was not the actual perpetrator of the crime, and arrested another African American man, Lewis Jackson. However, Jackson was released the next day after Kellam could not identify him. After a review of the incident, it was determined that Meadows was actually guilty.

Kellam confessed that she never had any doubt that Meadows had attacked her, but that she intentionally feigned doubts over his guilt. A local newspaper said Kellam was aware that confirming the guilt of Meadows beyond any doubt would guarantee his lynching, and she did not want to share responsibility for his death at the hands of a mob. After Kellam claimed that she was not entirely certain that Meadows was guilty, the mob had debated for roughly 24 hours whether to turn Meadows in. They decided to lynch him after finding bloodstains on his undershirt and hat. At the last moment, a white man had urged the crowd to reconsider their actions, as there was perhaps a small chance that Meadows was innocent. However, the lynching went forward after another white man said that Meadows had previously tried to rape a black girl. After hanging Meadows, the mob fired 500 shots at his corpse, hitting it 100 times.

Afterwards, it was reported that a black woman named Patsy Hamilton had accused Meadows of raping her daughter two years earlier. The accusation was verified during a coroner's inquest.

In 2019, Tony Bingham, a professor at Miles College and an advisor for the Jefferson County Memorial Project, announced his intent to either locate the site of Meadows's grave or have the Birmingham Zoo or Birmingham Botanical Gardens (both of which are located in Lane Park) erect a memorial at their facilities.
