= Birmingham Botanical Gardens =

Birmingham Botanical Gardens may refer to:

- Birmingham Botanical Gardens, England - a 15-hectare botanical garden in Birmingham, England
- Birmingham Botanical Gardens, Alabama - a 27.3 hectare botanical garden in Birmingham, Alabama
