= Easterwood Airport =

Regional airport in Texas, United States

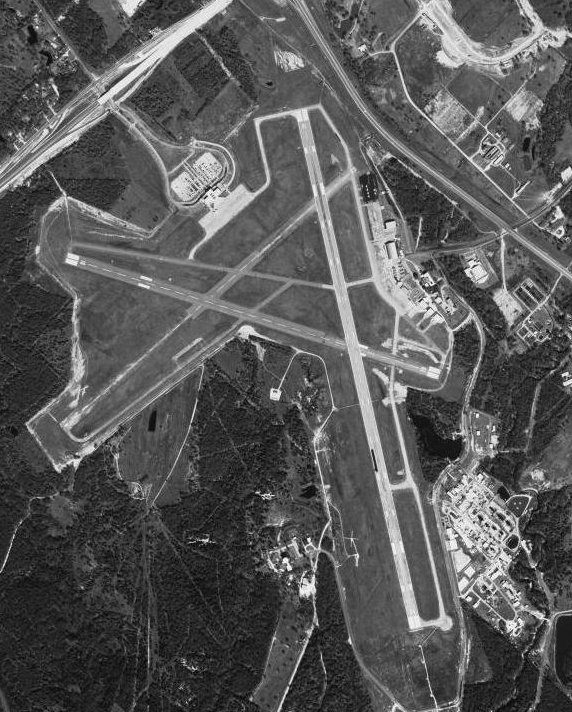
- IATA: CLL; ICAO: KCLL; FAA LID: CLL; WMO: 74746

Summary
- Airport type: Public
- Operator: Texas A&M University System
- Location: College Station, Texas
- Elevation AMSL: 321 ft (98 m)
- Coordinates: 30°35′19″N 96°21′50″W

Map
- Location within Texas Location within the United States

Runways
Direction	Length		Surface
Direction	ft	m	Surface
11/29	5,158	1,572	Asphalt
17/35	7,000	2,134	Asphalt/Concrete

Statistics (2019)
- Aircraft operations: 56,749
- Based aircraft: 50
- Sources: airport web site and FAA, Texas A&M Transportation Website

Easterwood Airport (IATA: CLL, ICAO: KCLL, FAA LID: CLL, Easterwood Field) is a regional airport in College Station, Texas, serving Texas A&M University, Bryan-College Station, and Brazos County, Texas. Accessed via FM 60 (Raymond Stotzer Parkway), it is 3 miles (4.8 km) southwest of the center of College Station, and 0.25 miles (0.40 km) from Texas A&M University. There is no public transportation from Easterwood Airport to the surrounding cities; however, in the fall of 2019, a new university bus route was established to connect Easterwood Airport with the Engineering Quad and the Texas A&M Hotel and Conference Center. The airport bus route is ostensibly available only to those with a University ID or Brazos Transit District ID, however, this requirement is not enforced.

Despite the Texas A&M University System owning and managing the airport, the university itself offers no aviation courses.

The William A. McKenzie Terminal at Easterwood Airport provides daily flights to Dallas/Fort Worth. The terminal has free 2 hour visitor parking and drop off areas on the upper level and shuttle/taxi pick up areas on the lower level.

The ticket counters, TSA security checkpoint, and boarding areas are on the upper level of the terminal. Baggage claim and rental car agencies are on the lower level.

== History ==
In 1938 the Board of Directors of the Agricultural and Mechanical College of Texas (as Texas A&M was known at the time) authorized the development of an airport at the existing site. The University applied to the Civil Aeronautics Authority (CAA) for certification as a primary flight training school under provisions of the Civilian Pilot Training Program.

In May 1940 the airport opened, named for U.S. Navy Lieutenant Jesse L. Easterwood. Easterwood was a former A&M student who enlisted in the British Royal Naval Air Service in 1917. After being commissioned as Ensign, he was later promoted to Lieutenant in the Naval Air Service and was the second American to qualify as Naval Aviation Pilot. He served with the Royal Flying Corps in 1918 and had sixteen successful raids behind German lines. He served in three foreign countries and was killed in an airplane accident in the Canal Zone May 19, 1919. He was awarded the Navy Cross posthumously "for distinguished and heroic service as an aviator."

The facility in 1940 had one hangar and a turf landing strip and taxiway which were eventually paved through funding provided by the CAA, the Works Projects Administration (WPA), and Texas A&M.

In 1948 a large hangar was relocated to the airfield from a US Army flying field near Corsicana, Texas. The FAA established a Flight Service Station (FSS) at the Airport in 1951 and Pioneer Air Lines began scheduled air service in that year. Many changes have occurred including moving the Flight Service Station to Montgomery County – as of 2022, only American Eagle provides scheduled air service. United Express formerly served the airport from Houston, but ended this service on January 4, 2022.

The first control tower was erected at the Airport in 1952 and a commercial passenger terminal was constructed in 1957. Work began on an extension of Runway 16-34 (now 17–35) to its present 7,000-foot (2,100 m) length in 1984. At the same time the parallel taxiway to Runway 16-34 was extended.

In 1988 work began on improvements to the Airport access road and construction of a new passenger terminal began. The new McKenzie Terminal opened in 1990 and plans were made to convert the old passenger terminal into a general aviation terminal. It was remodeled and re-opened for service in 1994 as a modern general aviation facility, housing line service and support personnel as well as flight operations.

== Facilities ==
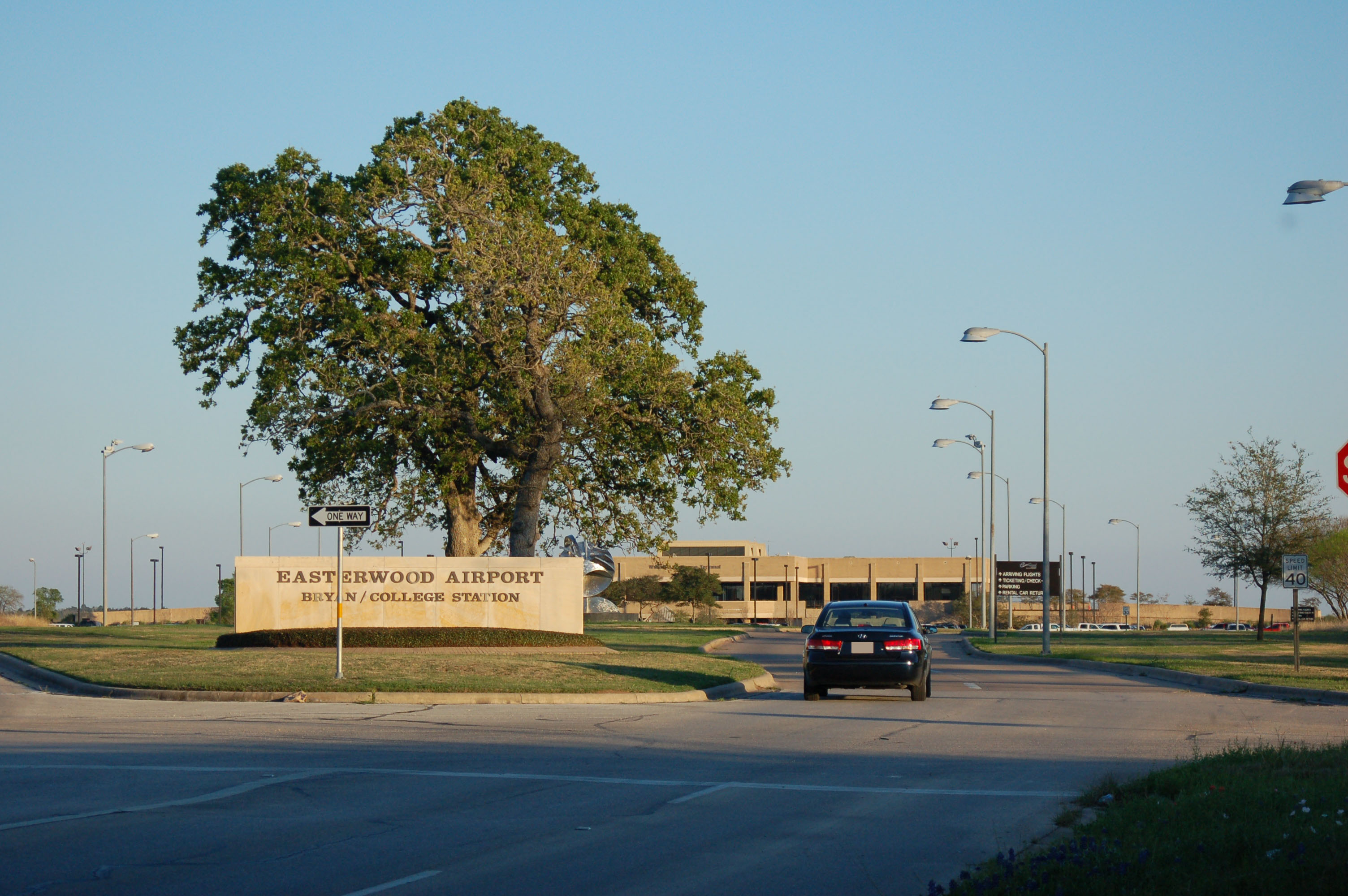
Entrance of airport

The airport covers 700 acres (280 hectares) and has two runways, 11/29, which is 5,158 by 146 feet (1,572 m × 45 m), asphalt and 17/35, which is 7,000 by 150 feet (2,134 m × 46 m), asphalt-concrete, all weather runway, an approach lighting system, an FAA control tower, FAA radio communication and an OmniRange-ILS Navigation Aid.

In the year ending December 31, 2019, the airport had 56,749 aircraft operations, average 155 per day: 58% general aviation, 33% military, 9% air taxi and <1% airline. 50 aircraft were then based at this airport: 25 single-engine, 5 multi-engine, 18 jet and 2 helicopter.

== Transportation ==
No public transportation infrastructure is available at Easterwood. Thus, travelers must utilize private transportation options including taxis, rental car services, and ride sharing. Texas A&M University has a shuttle bus designated as "Route 7" that runs between the University campus and Easterwood Airport. There are a few taxi companies registered with the City of College Station and the Easterwood Airport management. Rental car offices are located inside the terminal, while designated spaces for taxis and ride-shares are found outside.

== Airline and destination ==
Airlines	Destinations
American Airlines	Dallas/Fort Worth

== Statistics ==
Busiest domestic routes from CLL (October 2023 – September 2024)
Rank	Airport	Passengers	Carriers
1	Dallas/Fort Worth, Texas	59,590	American

== Accidents and incidents ==
- December 12, 1985: A GTE-owned Learjet 35A bound for Houston Hobby Airport rolled to the right and crashed right after take-off due to a catastrophic failure of the No. 2 engine, killing 2 out of the 3 onboard. Fatigue in the forward fan assembly was to blame and the inadequate maintenance standards of the manufacturer were a contributing factor.
- August 25, 1990: Continental Express flight 2427, en route to Houston Intercontinental Airport and operated by an Embraer EMB 120RT (N33701), experienced an engine surge while climbing out. The flight crew performed a precautionary landing after securing and feathering the affected engine. The aircraft involved would crash as Continental Express Flight 2574 a year later, killing all 14 onboard.

== See also ==
- List of airports in Texas
- Texas World War II Army Airfields
