= Eleanor Joyce Toliver-Williams =

Eleanor Joyce Toliver-Williams (December 21, 1936 - April 22, 2011) was the first African-American woman to be certified as a Federal Aviation Administration air traffic controller.

She was born Eleanor Joyce Toliver on December 21, 1936 in College Station, Texas. She graduated as valedictorian from Lincoln High School in College Station in 1955 and married Tollie Williams, Jr. that same year. She received a four year academic scholarship to Prairie View A&M University but only attended one semester since, according to her, having “kids too fast.” She and her husband had seven children and fostered another.

In 1963, Toliver-Williams and her family moved to Anchorage, Alaska to be closer to her sister, Vanee Robinson. Toliver-Williams started working for the FAA as part of their cleaning crew. She applied to the FAA in 1965 and got the job as GS-4 clerk stenographer. In 1971 she was certified as an air traffic controller Anchorage Air Route Traffic Control Center (ARTCC).

In 1994, she achieved another milestone as the first African-American woman to "head up a major en-route facility" at the Cleveland ARTCC in Oberlin, Ohio, the second-busiest en-route air traffic control facility in the United States. She retired in 1997.

She was affiliated with Gamma Phi Delta, Business and Professional Women, the Second Baptist Church, and the NAACP. Toliver-Williams was inducted into the Organization of Black Aerospace Professionals hall of fame in 2012.

== Awards ==
- Department of Transportation Secretary's Award for Excellence in EEO, 1985
- National Black Coalition of Federal Aviation Employees C. Alfred Anderson Award, 1991
- Texas Youth Advocate of the Year by Commission of Alcohol & Drug Abuse, 2001
- North to the Future BPW Club, Woman of the Year, 2006
- Proclamation of the Bronze Eagle, renamed the Eleanor J. Williams Bronze Eagle Award, 2011
