= College Station, Texas =

- City
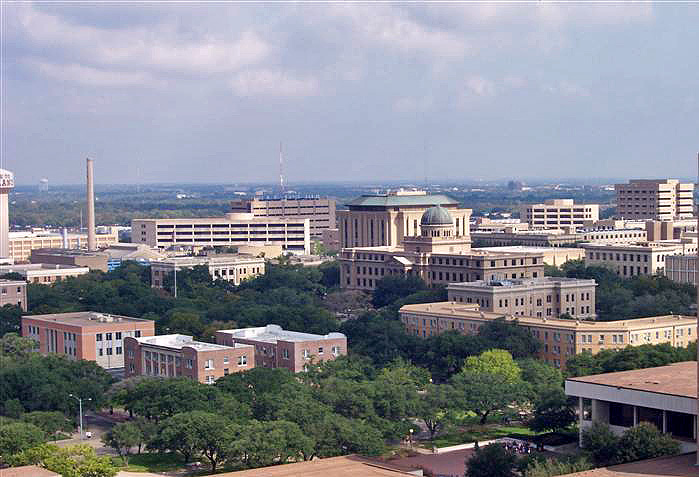
- College Station

- Location in the state of Texas

- Location within Texas Location within the United States
- Coordinates: 30°36′05″N 96°18′52″W
- Country: United States
- State: Texas
- County: Brazos
- Incorporated: October 19, 1938

Government
  - Type: Council-Manager
  - Mayor: John Nichols
  - City Council: Council members: Mark Smith, Place 1; William Wright, Place 2; David White, Place 3; Melissa McIlhaney, Place 4; Bob Yancy, Place 5; Scott Shafer, Place 6
  - City Manager: Bryan Woods

Area
  - City: 51.30 sq mi (132.87 km^{2})
  - Land: 51.16 sq mi (132.50 km^{2})
  - Water: 0.14 sq mi (0.37 km^{2})
- Elevation: 289 ft (88 m)

Population (2020)
  - City: 120,511
  - Density: 2,355.6/sq mi (909.52/km^{2})
  - Urban: 206,137 (US: 184th)
  - Metro: 268,248 (US: 186th)

GDP
  - Metro: $18.181 billion (2022)
- Time zone: UTC−6 (CST)
  - Summer (DST): UTC−5 (CDT)
- ZIP Codes: 77840-77845
- Area code: 979
- FIPS code: 48-15976
- GNIS feature ID: 2410193
- Website: www.cstx.gov

College Station is a city in Brazos County, Texas, United States, situated in East-Central Texas in the Brazos Valley, towards the eastern edge of the region known as the Texas Triangle. It is 83 miles (130 kilometers) northwest of Houston and 87 miles (140 km) east-northeast of Austin. As of the 2020 census, College Station had a population of 120,511. College Station and Bryan make up the Bryan-College Station metropolitan area, the 15th-largest metropolitan area in Texas, with an estimated population 287,476 as of 2026.

College Station is home to the main campus of Texas A&M University, the flagship institution of the Texas A&M University System. The city owes its name and existence to the university's location along a railroad. Texas A&M's triple designation as a land-grant university, National Sea Grant College Program, and National Space Grant College and Fellowship Program reflects the broad scope of the research endeavors it brings to the city, with ongoing projects funded by agencies such as NASA, the National Institutes of Health, the National Science Foundation, and the Office of Naval Research.

== History ==
College Station's origins date from 1860, when the Houston and Texas Central Railway began to build through the region. Eleven years later, the site was chosen as the location for the proposed Agricultural and Mechanical College of Texas, a land-grant school. In 1876, as the nation celebrated its centennial, the school (renamed Texas A&M University in 1963) opened its doors as the first public institution of higher education in the state of Texas.

College Station's population grew slowly, reaching 350 in 1884 and 391 at the turn of the century. However, during this time, transportation improvements took place in the town. In 1900, the I&GN Railroad was extended to College Station (the Missouri Pacific Railroad Company abandoned the line in 1965), and 10 years later, electric interurban service was established between Texas A&M and the neighboring town of Bryan. A city bus system replaced the interurban in the 1920s.

In 1930, the community to the north of College Station, known as North Oakwood, was incorporated as part of Bryan. College Station did not incorporate until October 19, 1938, after a 217-39 vote, with John H. Binney as the first mayor. Within a year, the city established a zoning commission, and by 1940, the population had reached 2,184.

The city grew under the leadership of Ernest Langford, called by some the "Father of College Station", who began a 26-year stretch as mayor in 1942. Early in his first term, the city adopted a council-manager system of city government.

Population growth accelerated following World War II as the nonstudent population reached 7,898 in 1950, 11,396 in 1960, 17,676 in 1970, 30,449 in 1980, 52,456 in 1990, and 67,890 in 2000. The Bryan-College Station metropolitan area's population crossed 270,000 people in 2018.

In the 1990s, College Station and Texas A&M University drew national attention when the George Bush Presidential Library opened in 1997. Attention was drawn again in 1999, when 12 people were killed and 27 injured when the Aggie Bonfire collapsed while being constructed.

In 2022, it became one of the first areas served by Amazon's Prime Air drone delivery service, along with Lockeford, California.

== Geography ==
According to the United States Census Bureau, the city has an area of 49.6 sq mi (128.5 km^{2}), of which 49.4 sq mi (128.0 km^{2}) is land and 0.19 sq mi (0.5 km^{2}), or 0.35%, is covered by water.

=== Climate ===
College Station has a humid subtropical climate (Köppen: Cfa). Winters are mild with periods of low temperatures usually lasting less than two months, while summers are hot and humid.

Snow and ice are rare; most recently, College Station received three to five inches of snowfall on February 15, 2021.

Summers are hot and humid, with occasional showers and thunderstorms being the only real variation in weather.

Precipitation and rainfall ranges from 50 millimeters (2 in) to 125 millimeters (4.9 in).

Climate data for College Station, Texas (Easterwood Airport), 1991–2020 normals, (Note: Mean monthly maxima and minima (i.e. the highest and lowest temperature readings during an entire month or year) calculated based on data at said location from 1981 to 2010.) extremes 1882–present (Note: Official records for College Station have been kept at Easterwood Airport since August 1951 and at an undisclosed location 6 mi (9.7 km) to the southwest of the city center from May 1, 1882 until July 1951.)
Month	Jan	Feb	Mar	Apr	May	Jun	Jul	Aug	Sep	Oct	Nov	Dec	Year
Record high °F (°C)	90 (32)	99 (37)	96 (36)	98 (37)	101 (38)	108 (42)	111 (44)	112 (44)	112 (44)	102 (39)	94 (34)	89 (32)	112 (44)
Mean maximum °F (°C)	78.9 (26.1)	82.0 (27.8)	85.8 (29.9)	89.4 (31.9)	93.7 (34.3)	97.9 (36.6)	100.9 (38.3)	102.8 (39.3)	98.8 (37.1)	92.9 (33.8)	84.6 (29.2)	79.9 (26.6)	104.0 (40.0)
Mean daily maximum °F (°C)	61.7 (16.5)	65.5 (18.6)	72.5 (22.5)	79.2 (26.2)	86.3 (30.2)	92.2 (33.4)	95.4 (35.2)	96.6 (35.9)	91.2 (32.9)	81.9 (27.7)	71.1 (21.7)	63.4 (17.4)	79.8 (26.5)
Daily mean °F (°C)	51.5 (10.8)	55.3 (12.9)	62.1 (16.7)	68.7 (20.4)	76.4 (24.7)	82.6 (28.1)	85.1 (29.5)	85.7 (29.8)	80.6 (27.0)	71.1 (21.7)	60.4 (15.8)	53.1 (11.7)	69.4 (20.8)
Mean daily minimum °F (°C)	41.3 (5.2)	45.1 (7.3)	51.7 (10.9)	58.1 (14.5)	66.4 (19.1)	73.0 (22.8)	74.9 (23.8)	74.7 (23.7)	70.0 (21.1)	60.2 (15.7)	49.8 (9.9)	42.8 (6.0)	59.0 (15.0)
Mean minimum °F (°C)	25.1 (−3.8)	28.6 (−1.9)	33.1 (0.6)	41.2 (5.1)	52.4 (11.3)	65.4 (18.6)	70.3 (21.3)	69.7 (20.9)	57.4 (14.1)	42.6 (5.9)	32.1 (0.1)	27.4 (−2.6)	22.5 (−5.3)
Record low °F (°C)	−3 (−19)	1 (−17)	17 (−8)	28 (−2)	42 (6)	53 (12)	58 (14)	55 (13)	41 (5)	29 (−2)	19 (−7)	2 (−17)	−3 (−19)
Average precipitation inches (mm)	3.43 (87)	2.90 (74)	3.41 (87)	2.87 (73)	4.60 (117)	4.01 (102)	1.98 (50)	3.10 (79)	3.50 (89)	4.93 (125)	3.31 (84)	3.71 (94)	41.75 (1,061)
Average precipitation days (≥ 0.01 in)	9.0	8.5	8.1	7.2	7.8	7.8	5.3	6.3	7.1	7.2	8.3	9.3	91.9
Source: NOAA

=== Districts ===
==== Northgate ====
Northgate is a mixed-use district north of Texas A&M University that features a combination of businesses, restaurants, apartments, churches, and entertainment. It is known for its eclectic mix of restaurants and bars. A large portion of the stores, bars, and restaurants in Northgate are frequented, patronized, and staffed by Texas A&M students. In total, the district spans about 145 acres (0.59 km^{2}), bounded by Wellborn Road to the west, South College Avenue to the east, the College Station city limits to the north, and University Drive to the south. The district is the home of the Dixie Chicken.

Northgate's roots started in the 1930s as the city began enjoying rapid population growth from the influx of Texas A&M University students, professors, and their families. Realizing that proximity to the campus would be a boon for revenues, the first business district was established in College Station near the campus, taking its name for the closest on-campus landmark: the north gate. When the city was incorporated in 1938, its first City Hall was opened in the new district. In 1994, restoration efforts began to revitalize the ailing area. A four-day music festival, "North By Northgate", was introduced in 1998 and has become an annual tradition, renamed the "Northgate Music Festival" in 2002. In 2006, the city council incorporated Northgate as a special tax zone to finance additional improvements and expansions.

Live music is a major draw to the Northgate area. Many well-known musicians, especially in the Texas country music scene, initially performed in the Northgate area. Notable names include Robert Earl Keen, Grammy award-winner Lyle Lovett, Dub Miller, and Roger Creager. The district is bisected to the north by Church Street, made famous by the Robert Earl Keen and Lyle Lovett duet "The Front Porch Song".

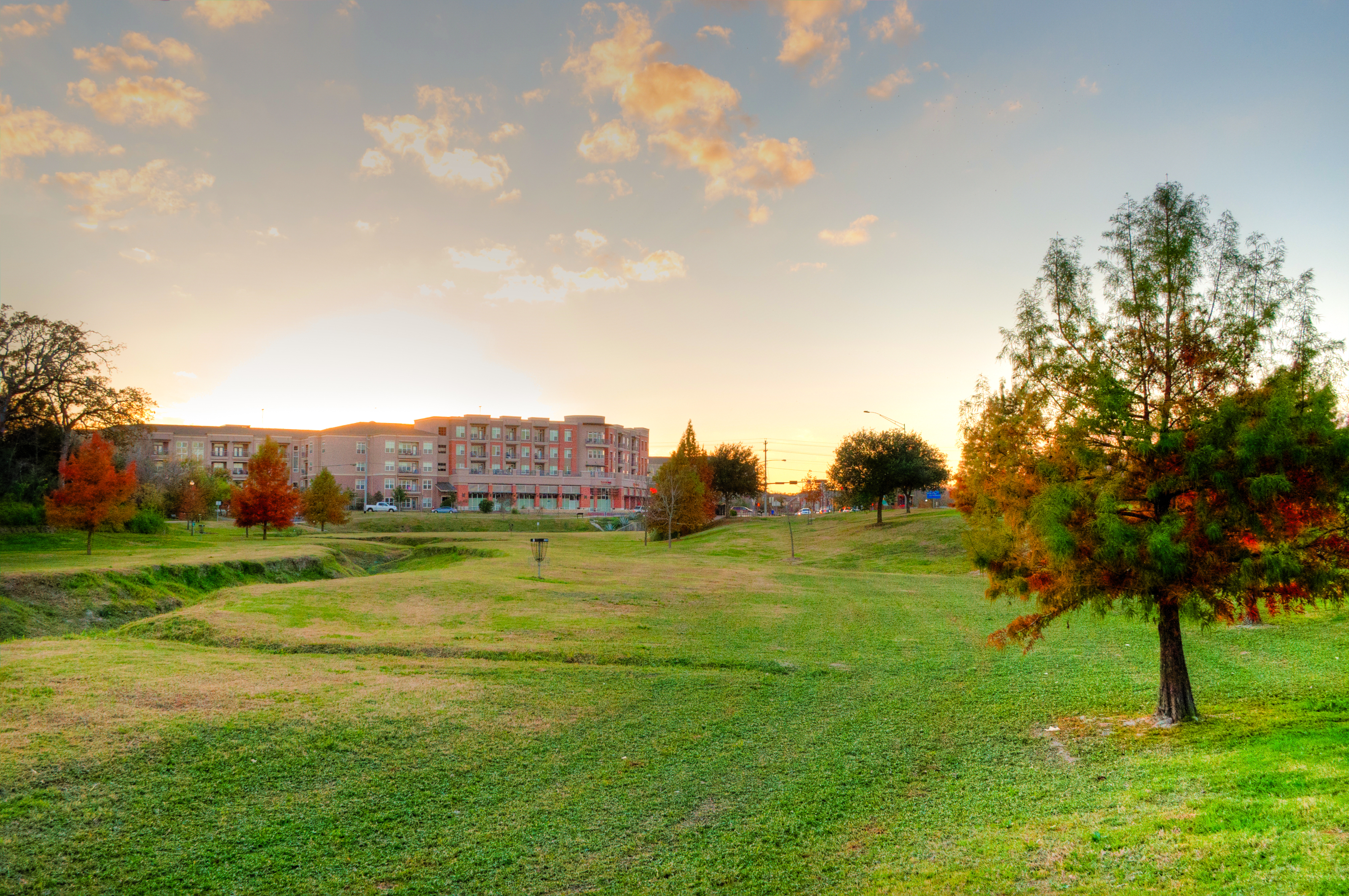
View of the Lofts at Wolf Pen Creek in College Station

==== Wellborn District ====
Wellborn became a community in 1867 as a construction camp on the Houston and Texas Central Railroad. The town's name has been attributed to a well at the construction camp, a foreman named E.W. Wellborn, or a landowner named W.W. Willburn. Also in 1867, a post office opened in the community under the name Wellborn Station. In 1870, the name was shortened to Wellborn. On April 14, 2011, the City Council of College Station voted 5–2 to annex Wellborn, thus making the community the Wellborn district. Wellborn is often mispronounced as 'well-born' but is pronounced by locals as 'Well-burn'.

== Demographics ==
Historical population
Census	Pop.	Note	%±
1940	2,184		—
1950	7,925		262.9%
1960	11,396		43.8%
1970	17,676		55.1%
1980	37,272		110.9%
1990	52,456		40.7%
2000	67,890		29.4%
2010	93,857		38.2%
2020	120,511		28.4%
2023 (est.)	125,192		3.9%
U.S. Decennial Census; 1850–1900 1910; 1920 1930 1940; 1950 1960 1970; 1980 1990 2000; 2010

As of the 2020 census, there were 120,511 people, 42,433 households, and 20,487 families residing in the city.

=== Racial and ethnic composition ===
College Station city, Texas – racial and ethnic composition Note: the US Census treats Hispanic/Latino as an ethnic category. This table excludes Latinos from the racial categories and assigns them to a separate category. Hispanics/Latinos may be of any race.
Race / ethnicity (NH = Non-Hispanic)	Pop 2000	Pop 2010	Pop 2020	% 2000	% 2010	% 2020
White alone (NH)	51,362	64,060	70,255	75.65%	68.25%	58.30%
Black or African American alone (NH)	3,647	6,161	9,479	5.37%	6.56%	7.87%
Native American or Alaska Native alone (NH)	161	247	280	0.24%	0.26%	0.23%
Asian alone (NH)	4,932	8,518	12,224	7.26%	9.08%	10.14%
Pacific Islander alone (NH)	36	36	117	0.05%	0.04%	0.10%
Some Other Race alone (NH)	107	149	475	0.16%	0.16%	0.39%
Mixed-race or multiracial (NH)	886	1,521	4,324	1.31%	1.62%	3.59%
Hispanic or Latino (any race)	6,759	13,165	23,357	9.96%	14.03%	19.38%
Total	67,890	93,857	120,511	100.00%	100.00%	100.00%

=== 2020 census ===
The median age was 22.5 years, 17.1% of residents were under the age of 18, and 6.5% of residents were 65 years of age or older. For every 100 females there were 103.2 males, and for every 100 females age 18 and over there were 103.6 males age 18 and over.

98.8% of residents lived in urban areas, while 1.2% lived in rural areas.

There were 42,433 households in College Station, of which 25.5% had children under the age of 18 living in them. Of all households, 32.3% were married-couple households, 29.8% were households with a male householder and no spouse or partner present, and 32.5% were households with a female householder and no spouse or partner present. About 30.2% of all households were made up of individuals and 4.4% had someone living alone who was 65 years of age or older.

There were 48,782 housing units, of which 13.0% were vacant. Among occupied housing units, 31.6% were owner-occupied and 68.4% were renter-occupied. The homeowner vacancy rate was 2.7% and the rental vacancy rate was 12.1%.

Racial composition as of the 2020 census
Race	Number	Percent
White	76,475	63.5%
Black or African American	9,788	8.1%
American Indian and Alaska Native	593	0.5%
Asian	12,317	10.2%
Native Hawaiian and Other Pacific Islander	132	0.1%
Some other race	8,903	7.4%
Two or more races	12,303	10.2%
Hispanic or Latino (of any race)	23,357	19.4%

=== 2000 census ===
As of the census of 2000, 67,890 people, 24,691 households, and 10,370 families resided in the city. Of the 24,691 households, 21.0% had children under the age of 18 living with them, 32.2% were married couples living together, 6.8% had a female householder with no husband present, and 58.0% were not families. About 27.1% of all households were made up of individuals, and 2.4% had someone living alone who was 65 years of age or older. The average household size was 2.32 and the average family size was 2.98. The racial makeup of the city as of 2019 was 77.45% White, 7.74% African American, 0.30% Native American, 10.25% Asian, 0.08% Pacific Islander, 6.32% from other races, and 2.3% from two or more races. Hispanic or Latino people of any ethnicity/nationality were 15.6% of the population.

In the city, the population was distributed as 14.4% under the age of 18, 51.2% from 18 to 24, 21.3% from 25 to 44, 9.4% from 45 to 64, and 3.6% who were 65 years of age or older. The median age was 22 years. For every 100 females, there were 104.3 males. For every 100 females age 18 and over, there were 104.0 males.

=== Income and poverty ===
Data from the ACS 1-year estimates indicates that the median income for a household in College Station was $47,632, a decrease from $52,397 reported in the 2020 census. According to Forbes, approximately 28.5% of the population lived below the poverty line in 2021, including 16.4% of those under age 18 and 7.7% of those aged 65 or older. The ACS 1-year estimates suggest this percentage may be as high as 30.2%, the highest poverty rate among U.S. cities with populations over 100,000. However, this statistic is likely impacted by the fact that Texas A&M University has the largest student enrollment in the U.S. (and has had for the last five years as of the 2025-26 college year). The U.S. Census Bureau has noted that "both in small counties with a large university and in large counties with multiple universities, the presence of college students who live off campus raises the community's poverty rate."

== Economy ==
In 2023, the total real gross domestic product (GDP) of the College Station–Bryan area is $15.8 billion, which has been growing steadily since 2020. Anchored by education and research, the region had contributed an estimated $22.3 billion in income to the Texas economy (approximately 1% of state GSP) in fiscal year 2022–23. Texas A&M University is the largest employer in the metro area, with almost 21,000 employees on the main campus.

As of 2025, the local unemployment hovered around 3 to 3.5%, among the lowest in Texas. This rate is largely attributed to the significant role the university plays in the local economy.However, underemployment is an ongoing issue.

=== Major employers ===
- Texas A&M University System – education – 16,248
- Bryan Independent School District – education – 1,952
- St. Joseph Regional Health Center – health services – 1,590
- Sanderson Farms – poultry processing – 1,539
- College Station Independent School District – education – 1,400
- Reynolds and Reynolds/Rentsys – computer hardware/software – 959
- City of Bryan – government – 889
- City of College Station – government – 865
- Walmart – retail – 650
- Ply Gem – windows – 611
- H-E-B Grocery – retail – 590

=== Post Oak Mall ===
Post Oak Mall was the city's first mall, and is currently the largest mall in the Brazos Valley. The 82-acre (330,000 m^{2}) mall is home to 125 stores. Its opening on February 17, 1982, helped create the impetus for growing economic and commercial developments for College Station. It is currently the largest taxpayer in College Station and the second-largest in the Brazos Valley, though the anchor stores are free-standing units that are privately owned and taxed separately from the mall proper. Over 75% of retail sales in the Brazos Valley come from sales at the mall's stores.

== Arts and culture ==
=== Points of interest ===
- George Bush Presidential Library
- The Day the Wall Came Down, 1997 sculpture
- D. A. "Andy" Anderson Arboretum

== Parks and recreation ==
=== Sports facilities ===
- Kyle Field
- Texas World Speedway (demolished)
- Reed Arena
- Olsen Field
- Ellis Field

== Government ==
The city of College Station has a council-manager form of government. Voters elect the members of a city council, who pass laws and make policy. The council hires a professional city manager who is responsible for day-to-day operations of the city and its public services.

== Education ==
=== Local colleges and universities ===
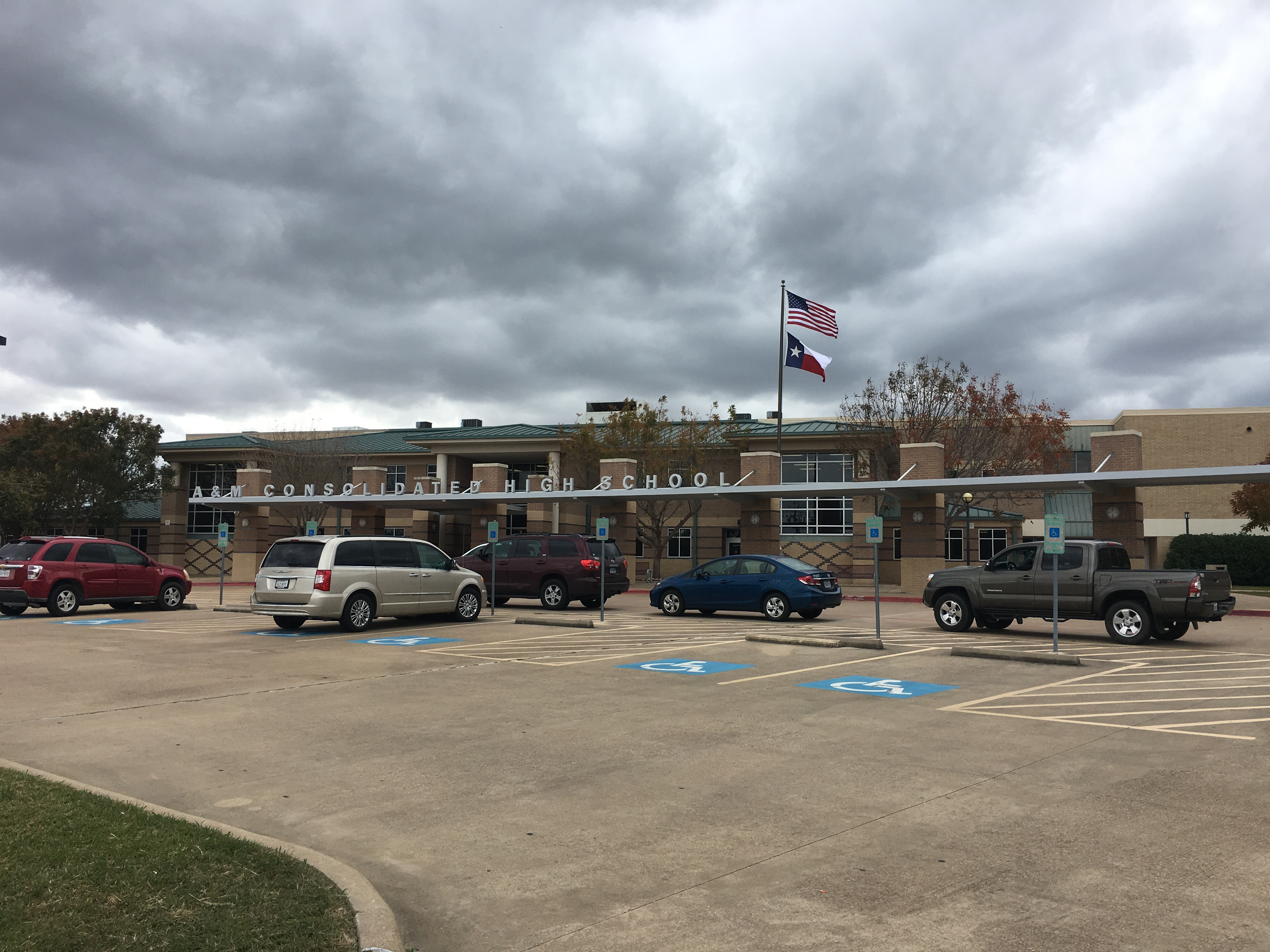
A&M Consolidated High School

- Texas A&M University
- Texas A&M Health Science Center

Blinn College is the designated community college for all of the county.

=== Local school districts ===
Almost all of College Station is within the College Station Independent School District, while small sections are in Bryan Independent School District. College Station ISD operates two high schools: A&M Consolidated High School and College Station High School.

Students living in the portion of Bryan ISD located in the City of College Station are zoned for Stephen F. Austin Middle School, and Bryan High School.

== Media ==
=== Television stations ===
Two full power local commercial television stations included CBS affiliate KBTX-TV (which also includes subchannels affiliated with CW and Telemundo) and MyNetworkTV affiliate KYLE-TV, which also airs Fox programming (via Waco-based KWKT-TV) on its second digital subchannel. Low power television stations KAGS-LD and KRHD-CD respectively air programming from NBC (via Temple-based KCEN-TV) and ABC (via Waco-based KXXV). PBS member station KAMU, which is owned by Texas A&M University, is also based in College Station.

=== Radio stations ===
College Station is part of the Bryan-College Station Arbitron market #238.

=== Newspapers ===
- The Bryan-College Station Eagle (city newspaper)
- The Battalion (Texas A&M University newspaper)

== Infrastructure ==
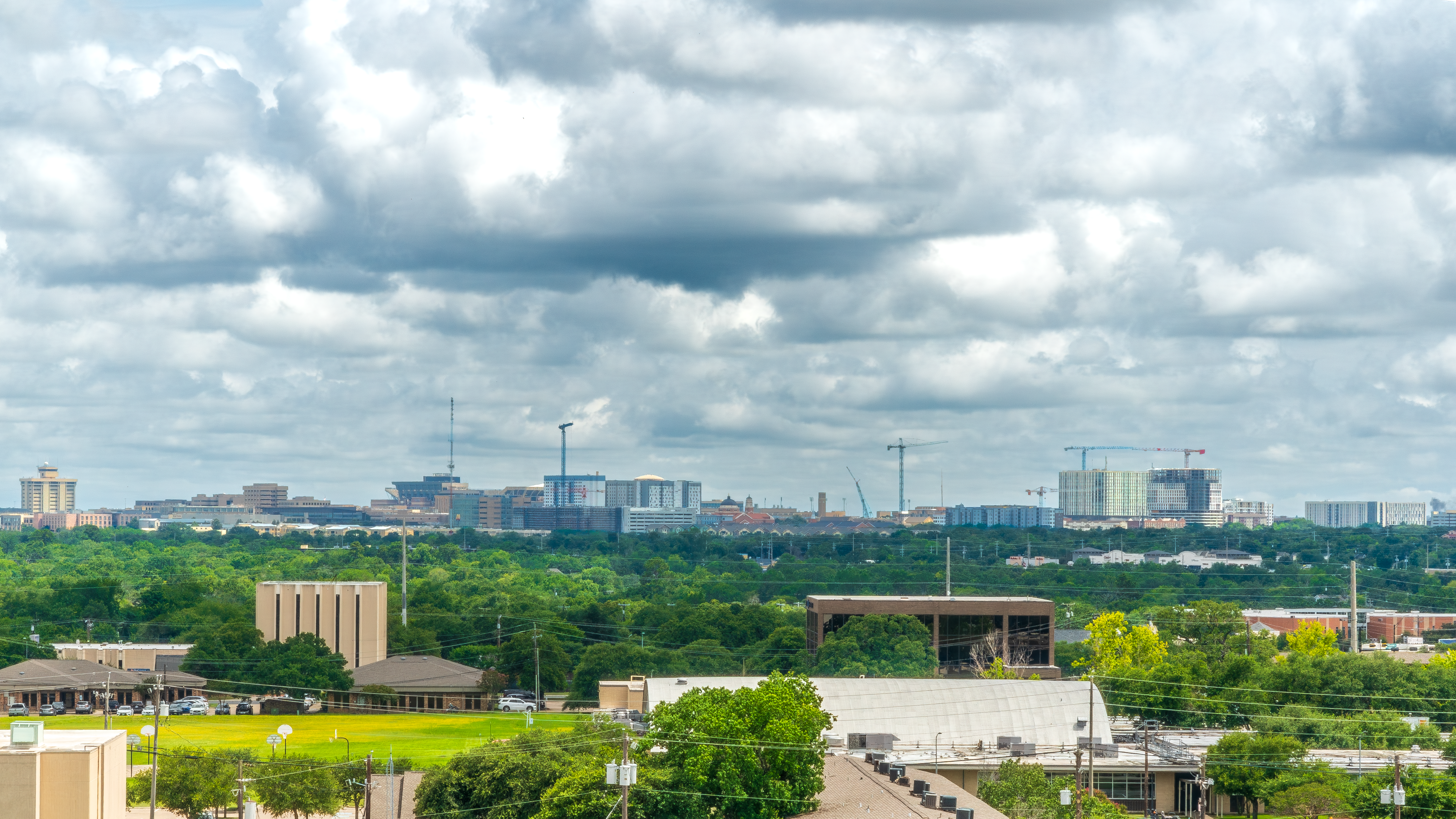
College Station Skyline

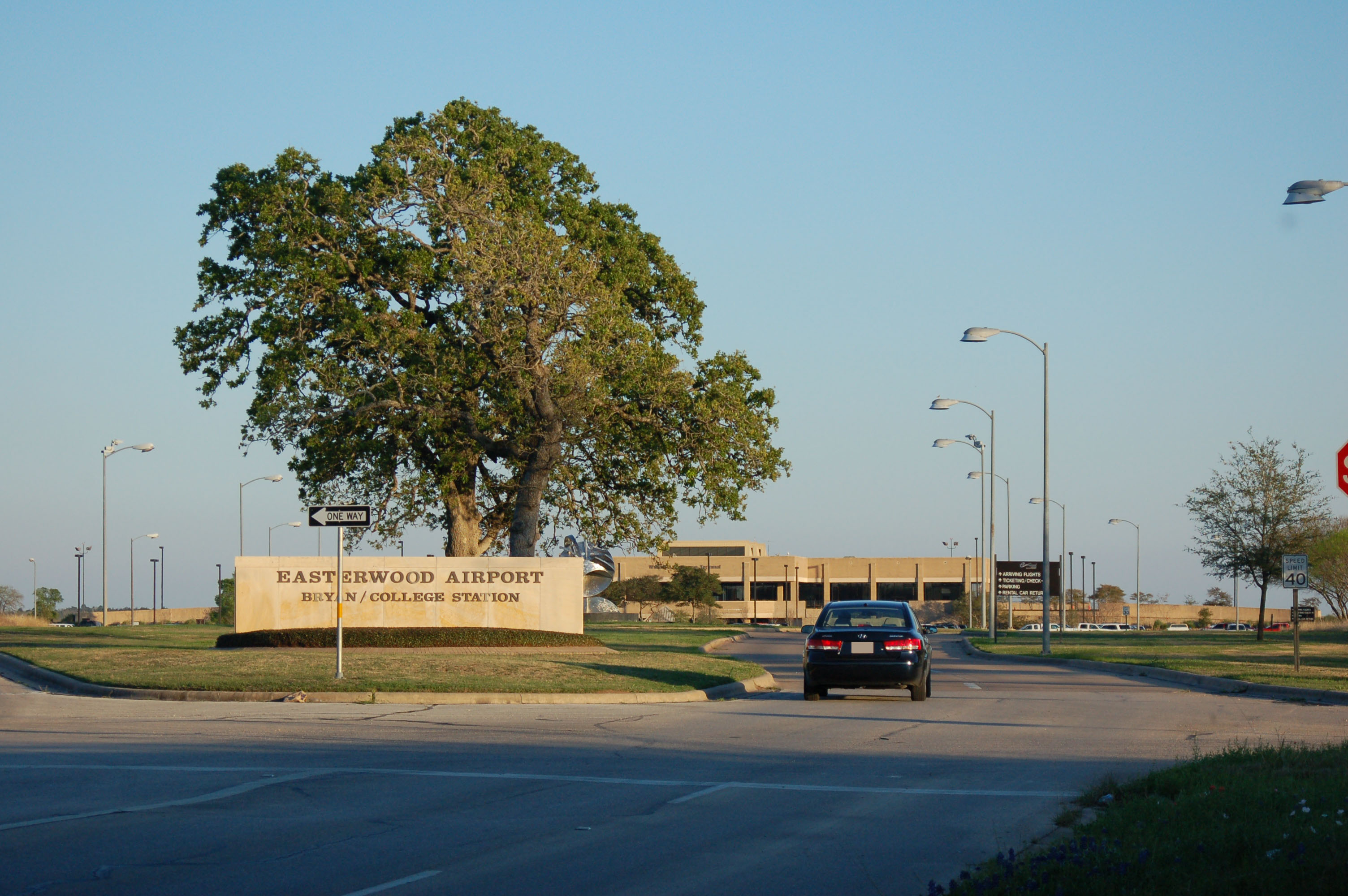
Easterwood Airport

=== Transportation ===
==== Mass transit ====
- The Brazos Transit District (formerly Brazos Valley Transit Authority) provides public bus transportation in the Bryan/College Station area.
- Texas A&M Transportation Services provides bus transportation throughout College Station and Bryan for students, faculty, and staff of Texas A&M University and Blinn College. On Texas A&M football game days, the department provides additional park-and-ride service to and from Kyle Field.
- Starline Travel offers weekend service from Texas A&M's campus to downtown Houston, with additional Houston service for Aggie game days and additional service to Dallas during major A&M breaks.
- Groundshuttle provides daily shuttles to and from Houston airports (Hobby and Bush).
- FlixBus provides service to Fort Worth and Houston.

==== Major roads ====
- State Highway 6: Earl Rudder Freeway (East Bypass)
- State Highway 6 Business: Texas Avenue
- State Highway 30: Harvey Road
- State Highway 40: William D. Fitch Parkway
- State Highway 47: Riverside Parkway
- State Highway 308: College Avenue
- Farm to Market Road 60: University Drive / Raymond Stotzer Parkway
- Farm to Market Road 2154: Wellborn Road
- Farm to Market Road 2347: George Bush Drive
- Farm to Market Road 2818: Harvey Mitchell Parkway (West Bypass)
- Farm to Market Road 159: Rock Prairie Road

==== Railroads ====
- Union Pacific Railroad line: Union Pacific Corporation (NYSE: UNP), over former tracks of the Southern Pacific Railroad, which operated the Sunbeam passenger train to 1957. Amtrak ran a section of the Texas Eagle over that route from 1988 to 1995.

==== Airport ====
Easterwood Airport, owned by the Texas A&M University System, is located 3 miles (4.8 km) southwest of the center of College Station and has flights to Dallas/Fort Worth International Airport.

== Notable people ==
The following people have lived or are currently living in College Station:

- George Bass, archaeologist, called the "Father of underwater archaeology"
- David Bereit, anti-abortion activist
- Matthew Berry, ESPN fantasy sport analyst and son of College Station mayor Nancy Berry
- Norman Borlaug, "The Man Who Saved a Billion Lives", agronomist, humanitarian, and Nobel laureate who has been called "the father of the Green Revolution"
- Alex Caruso, professional NBA basketball player
- John David Crow, late athletic director at Texas A&M University; former football player and coach
- Saagar Enjeti, journalist, podcast host and political commentator
- Larry Fedora, former head football coach of the University of North Carolina
- Lafayette L. Foster, 5th president of Texas A&M University, 28th speaker of the Texas House of Representatives
- Robert Gates, former Texas A&M University president and former Secretary of Defense
- Kristy Hawkins, IFBB professional bodybuilder
- Kyle Kacal, member of the Texas House of Representatives from College Station since 2013
- Robert Earl Keen, singer-songwriter
- David Konderla, Roman Catholic bishop of Tulsa
- Arnold Krammer, historian at Texas A&M University, 1974–retirement in 2015
- David M. Lee, physics professor at TAMU, 1996 Nobel laureate in Physics
- R. Bowen Loftin, physicist, former president of Texas A&M University
- Lyle Lovett, singer-songwriter
- Seth McKinney, former NFL football player and now owner of Crossfit Aggieland in College Station
- Ilan Mitchell-Smith, actor, starring in Weird Science, Journey to the Center of the Earth, among others; professor of English at California State University, Long Beach
- John N. Raney, member of the Texas House of Representatives from College Station since 2011, owner of Aggieland Book Store since 1969
- Rico Rodriguez, actor, known for his role of Manny Delgado in the ABC sitcom Modern Family
- Thomas Sadoski, award-winning actor, starring in HBO's The Newsroom, among others
- Brek Shea, soccer player, member of FC Dallas and the United States Men's National Soccer Team
- R. C. Slocum, former Texas A&M University head football coach (1989–2002)
- Bjarne Stroustrup, computer scientist, designer, and original implementor of C++; Distinguished Professor at Texas A&M University; AT&T Fellow
- Tiffany Thornton, actress, starring in Disney Channel's Sonny With a Chance
- Garrett Wareing, actor
- Eleanor Joyce Toliver-Williams, the first certified, African-American, female Federal Aviation Administration controller
- Alok Vaid-Menon, performance artist and LGBTQ rights activist
- Martha Wells, author, winner of four Hugo Awards, two Nebula Awards and three Locus Awards
- Christine Wormuth, 25th United States Secretary of the Army
- Patrick Zurek, Roman Catholic bishop of Amarillo, founding pastor of St. Thomas Aquinas Parish
- Johnny Silverhand, notable fictional character from the Cyberpunk series, created by Mike Pondsmith
