= D. A. "Andy" Anderson Arboretum =

Arboretum in College Station, Texas

Coordinates: 30.602396°N 96.306088°W

- Interactive map of D. A. "Andy" Anderson Arboretum
- Type: Arboretum
- Location: 1900 Anderson Street, College Station, Texas
- Area: 17 acres (6.9 ha)
- Website: Official website

The D. A. "Andy" Anderson Arboretum, originally named the Brazos County Arboretum, is a 17-acre (6.9 ha) arboretum located at 1900 Anderson Street, College Station, Texas and the arboretum is open daily without charge.

The arboretum was created in 1976 by the city as part of the USA Bicentennial celebration, and renamed in 1986 to honor former Mayor Andy Anderson. It borders on Bee Creek, and contains a shelter and an interpretive trail system that describes native Texas plants.
