= Birmingham Botanical Gardens, Alabama =

Botanical garden in Birmingham, Alabama

Birmingham Botanical Gardens
- Interactive map of Birmingham Botanical Gardens
- Location: 2612 Lane Park Road; Birmingham, Alabama 35223
- Coordinates: 33°29′30″N 86°46′28″W
- Area: 67.5 acres (27.3 ha)
- Created: 1963
- Operator: City of Birmingham/ Friends of Birmingham Botanical Gardens
- Visitors: 350,000+
- Open: Dawn to dusk
- Status: Open all year
- Website: bbgardens.org

The Birmingham Botanical Gardens is 67.5-acre (27.3 ha) of botanical gardens located adjacent to Lane Park at the southern foot of Red Mountain in Birmingham, Alabama, United States. The gardens are home to over 12,000 different types of plants, 25 unique gardens, more than 30 works of original outdoor sculpture, and several miles of walking paths. With more than 350,000 annual visitors, the Birmingham Botanical Gardens qualify as one of Alabama's top free-admittance tourist attractions. The Birmingham Botanical Gardens is also a part of the American Public Gardens Association.

The gardens include a garden center that has a library (the largest public horticulture library in the U.S.), auditorium, Linn-Henley Lecture Hall, Blount Education Center, Gerlach Plant Information Center, Alabama Cooperative Extension System office, Arrington Children's Plant Adventure Zone, and a restaurant.

== History ==
The Birmingham Botanical Gardens began as an idea prior to 1960. Then-Birmingham mayor James W. Morgan, led an effort to establish the gardens on a 69-acre (28 ha) portion of unused city property east of the Birmingham Zoo on the side of Red Mountain. The garden officially opened in 1963. The Birmingham Botanical Society, now known as the Friends of Birmingham Botanical Gardens, was established in 1964 with a mission of helping the city to support and improve the garden.

== Friends of Birmingham Botanical Gardens ==
While the City of Birmingham funds the core necessities of the Birmingham Botanical Gardens (BBG), the Friends of Birmingham Botanical Gardens (FBBG) was formed to raise funds for the gardens outside of the day-to-day needs. According to the BBG website, the mission of the FBBG is "to protect, nurture, and share the Gardens’ countless wonders". Not only does the FBBG help fundraise for the gardens, they provide outreach and educational programs to help patrons learn about the gardens and its importance to the surrounding community.

== Library ==
The Birmingham Botanical Garden hosts a library with over 14,000 books, audiobooks, DVDs, and more. These items include books on gardening for children or adults, horticulture magazines, and teaching resources with lesson plan materials. The library contains an Archives and Rare Book Room that was created in partnership with "Friends of Birmingham Botanical Gardens, the City of Birmingham, the Alabama Cooperative Extension System, plant groups, garden clubs, and societies." The archive contains many different manuscripts, photographs, catalogs, and even plant fossils.

The library hosts a seed exchange program. This encourages the community to plant native flora, and to bond through sharing seeds and information. The exchange requires the patron to donate a package of fresh seeds (non-GMO) or make a $10 donation before choosing a packet to take home.

== Gardens and garden features ==
- Sonat Lake
- Hill Garden
- Kayser Lily Pool
- Cochran Water Wall
- Dunn Formal Rose Garden (featuring a Moon tree)
- Ireland Old-Fashioned Rose Garden
- Crape Myrtle Garden Conservatory
- Desert House
- Camellia House
- Samford Orchid Display Room
- Formal Garden
- Queen’s Gates
- Twin Urn Fountains
- Cabaniss Walk
- Forman Garden
- Enabling Garden
- Thompson Enthusiast Garden
- Bruno Vegetable Garden
- Herb Terrace
- Hess Camellia Garden
- Bog Gardens
- Kaul Wildflower Garden
- Fern Glade
- Curry Rhododendron Garden
- Little Ones’ Memory Garden
- Curry Rhododendron Species Garden
- Jemison Lily Garden
- Hosta Walk
- Ireland Iris Garden
- The Southern Living Garden
- Lawler Gates
- McReynolds Garden
- Barber Alabama Woodlands
- Hulsey Woods
- Japanese Gardens
- Torii (Gateway to Heaven)
- Tea House and Karesansui
- Hulsey Woods
- Cultural Pavilion
- Viewing Shelter and Long Life Lake
- Bonsai House
- Richard Arrington Plant Adventure Zone
Garden features
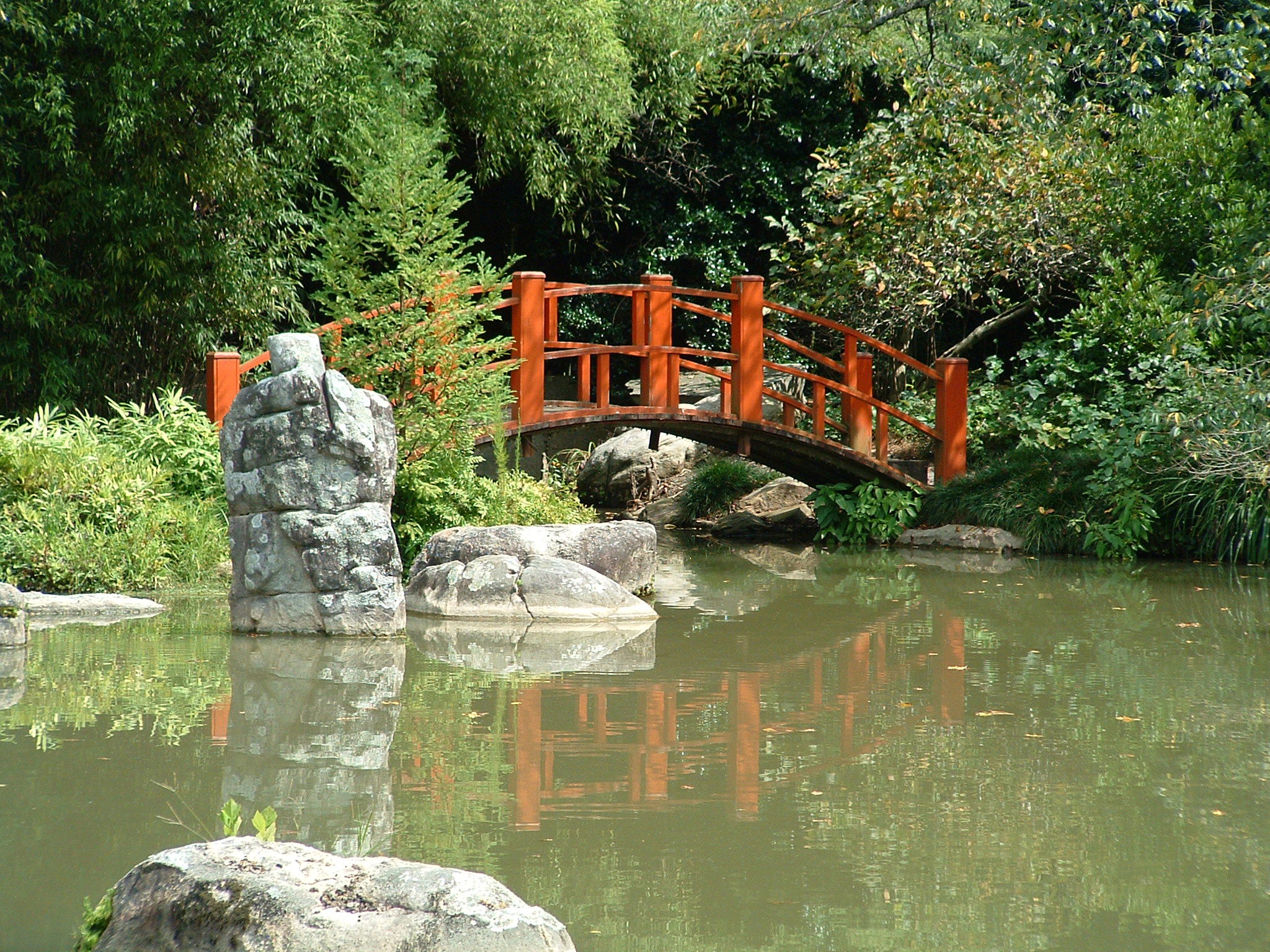
Long Life Lake bridge

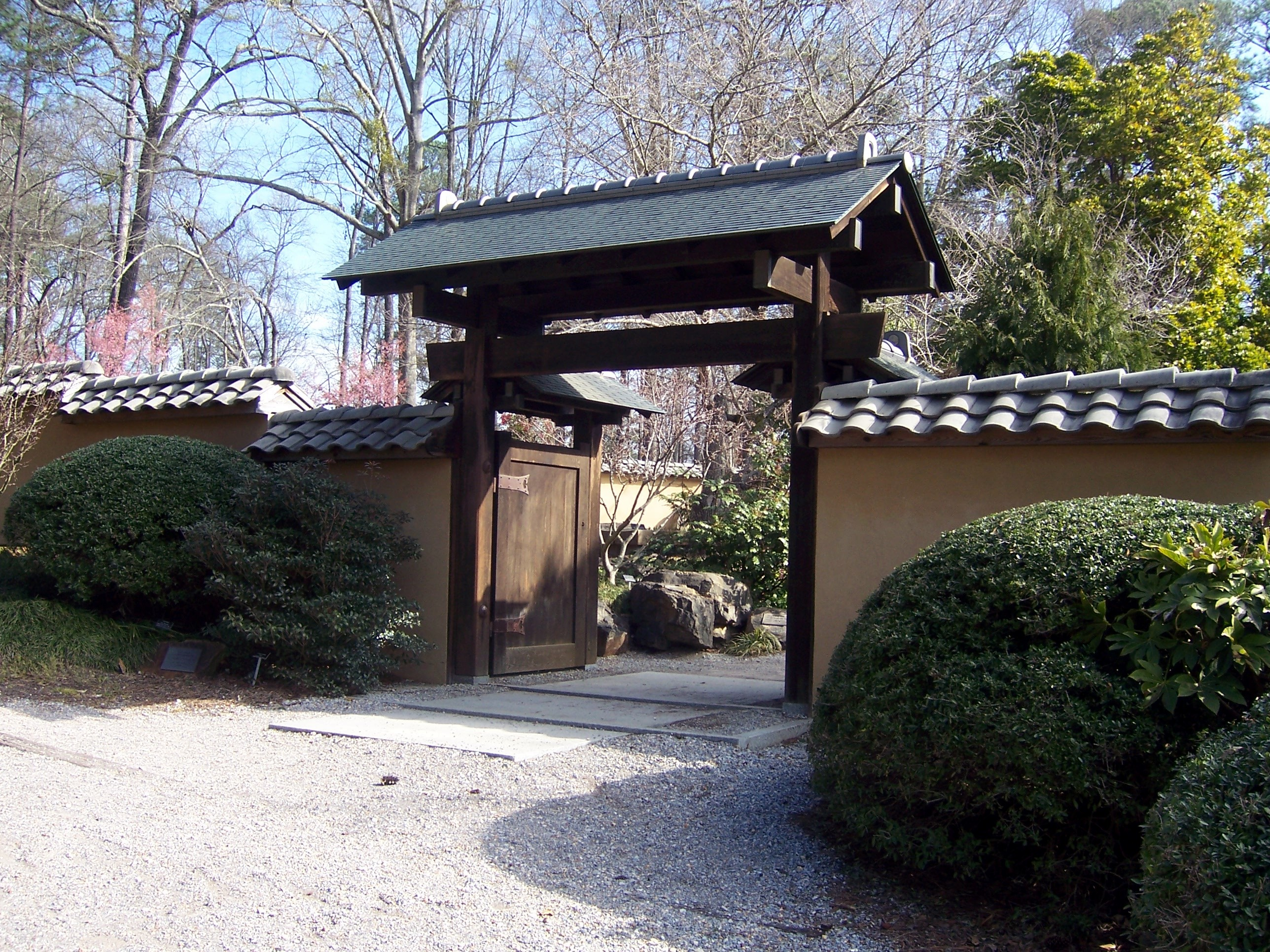
The Taylor Gate

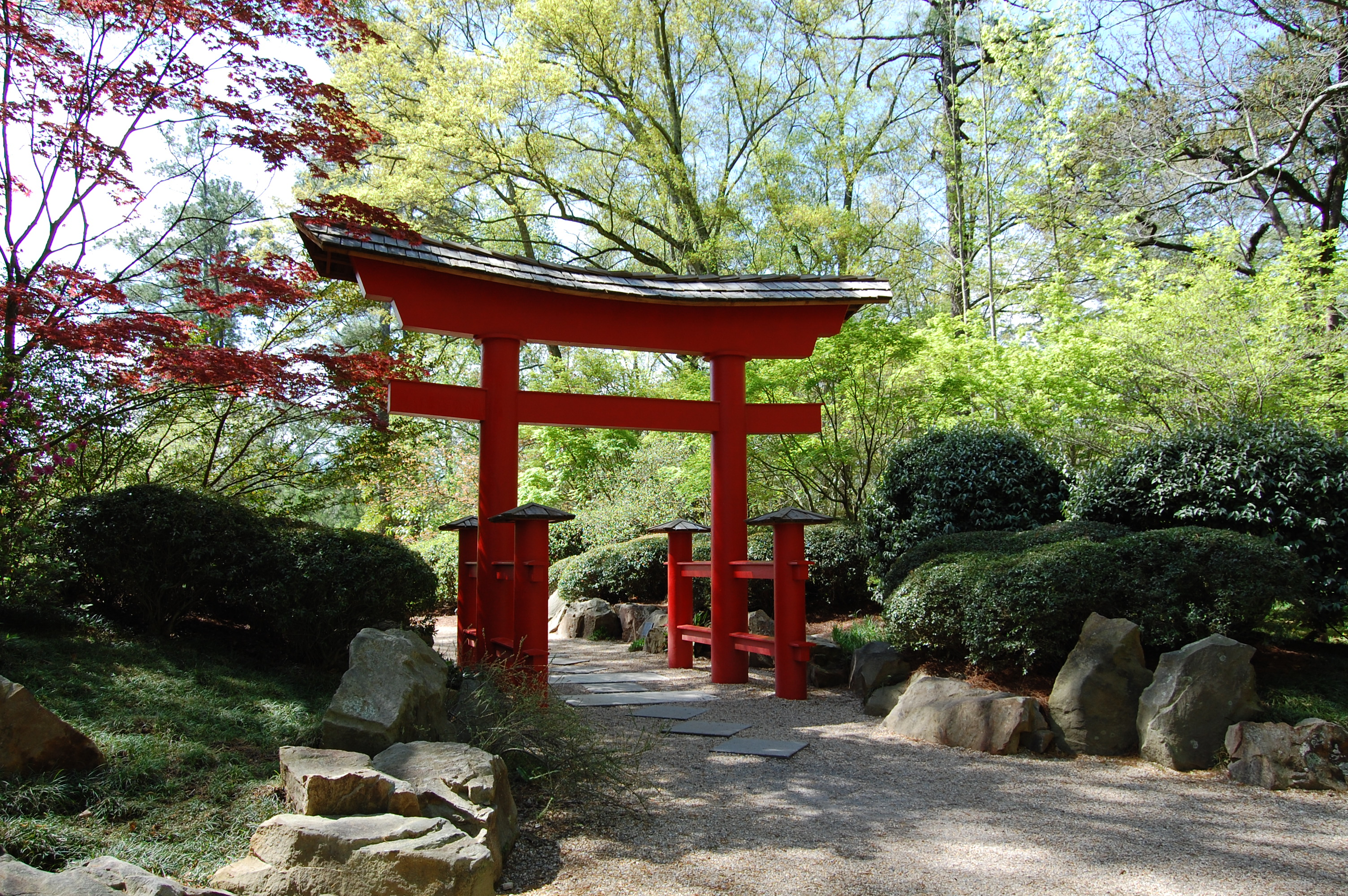
Torii

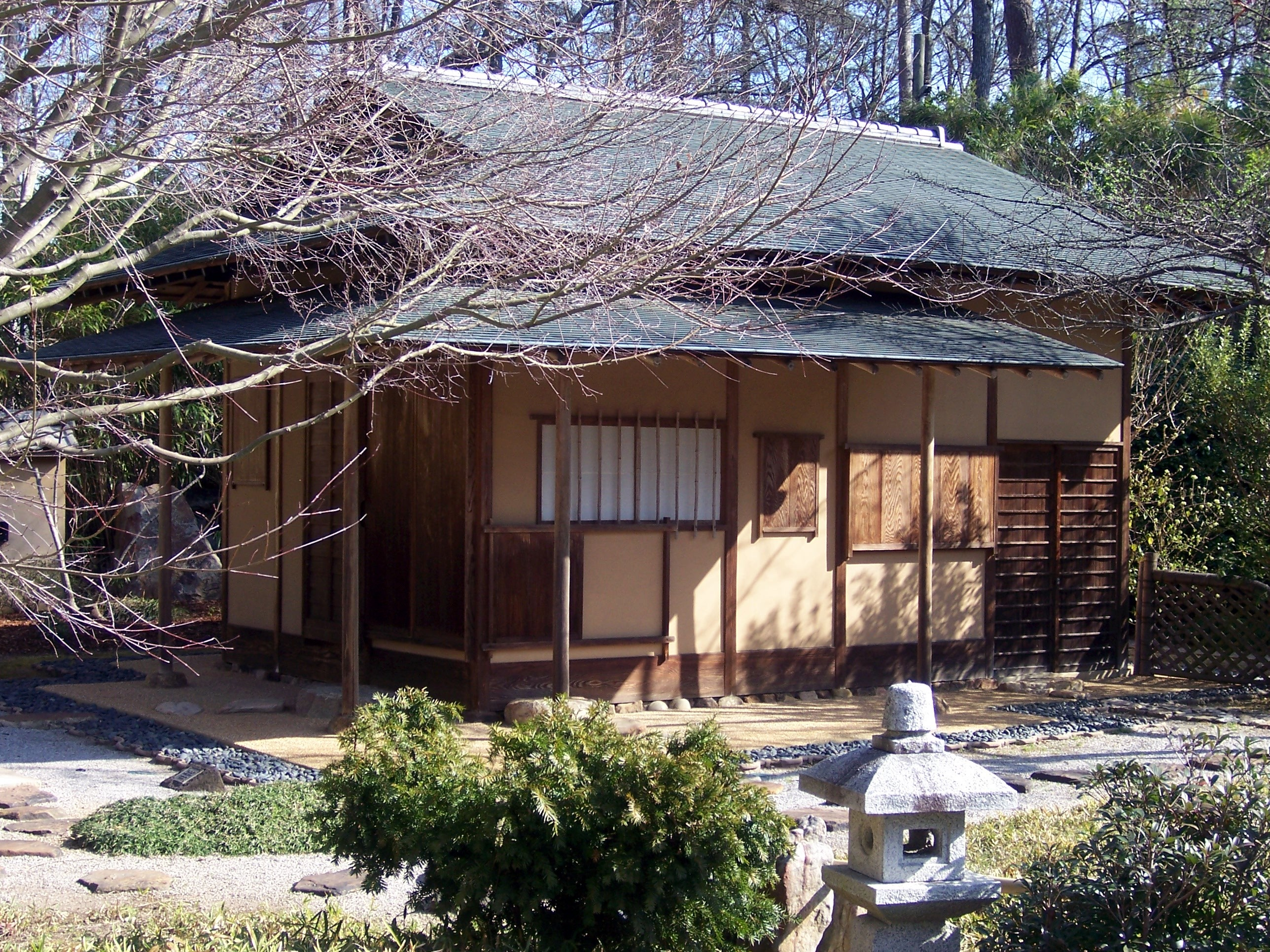
Tea House

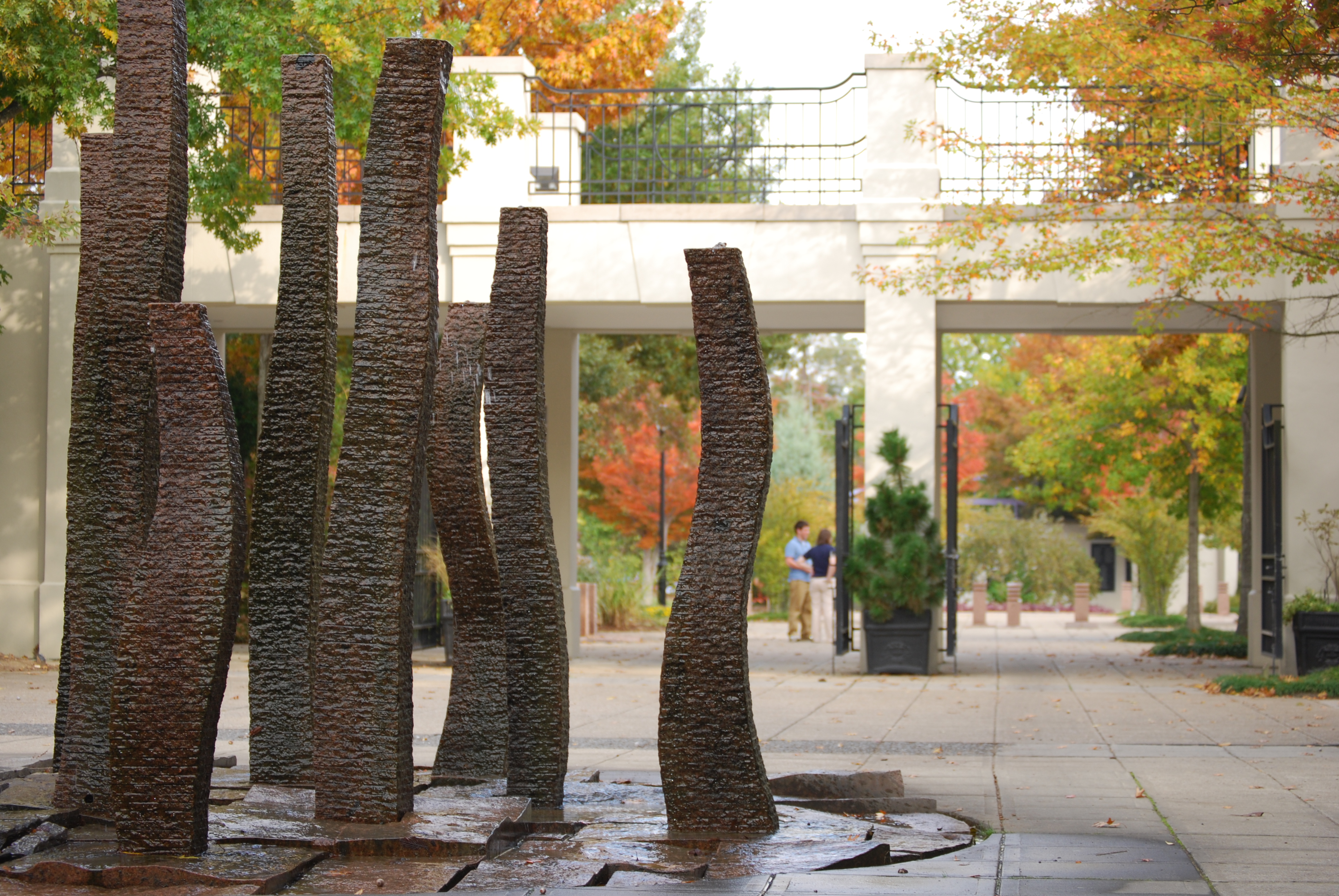
Granite Garden Fountain in Blount Square

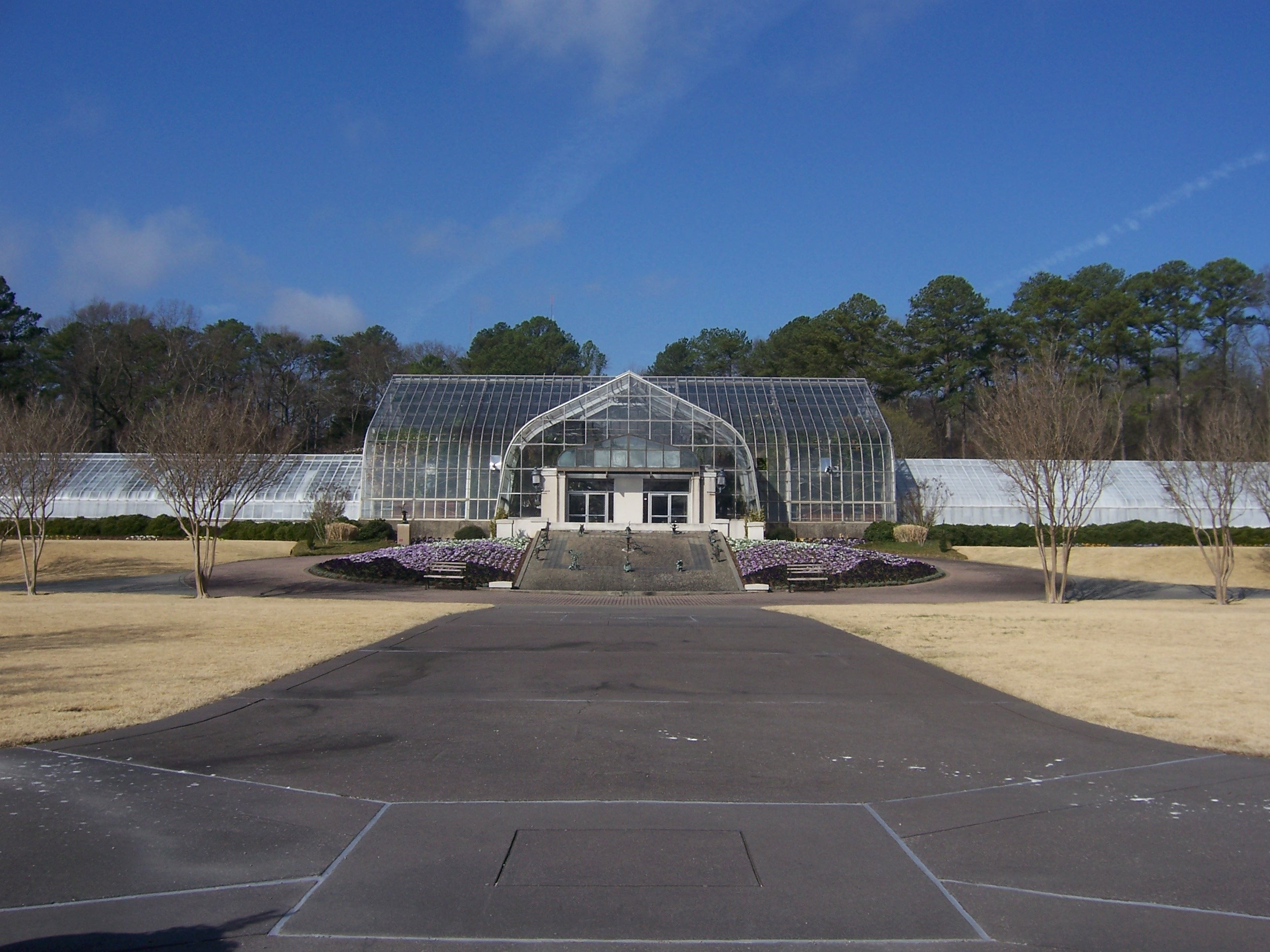
The Conservatory during winter

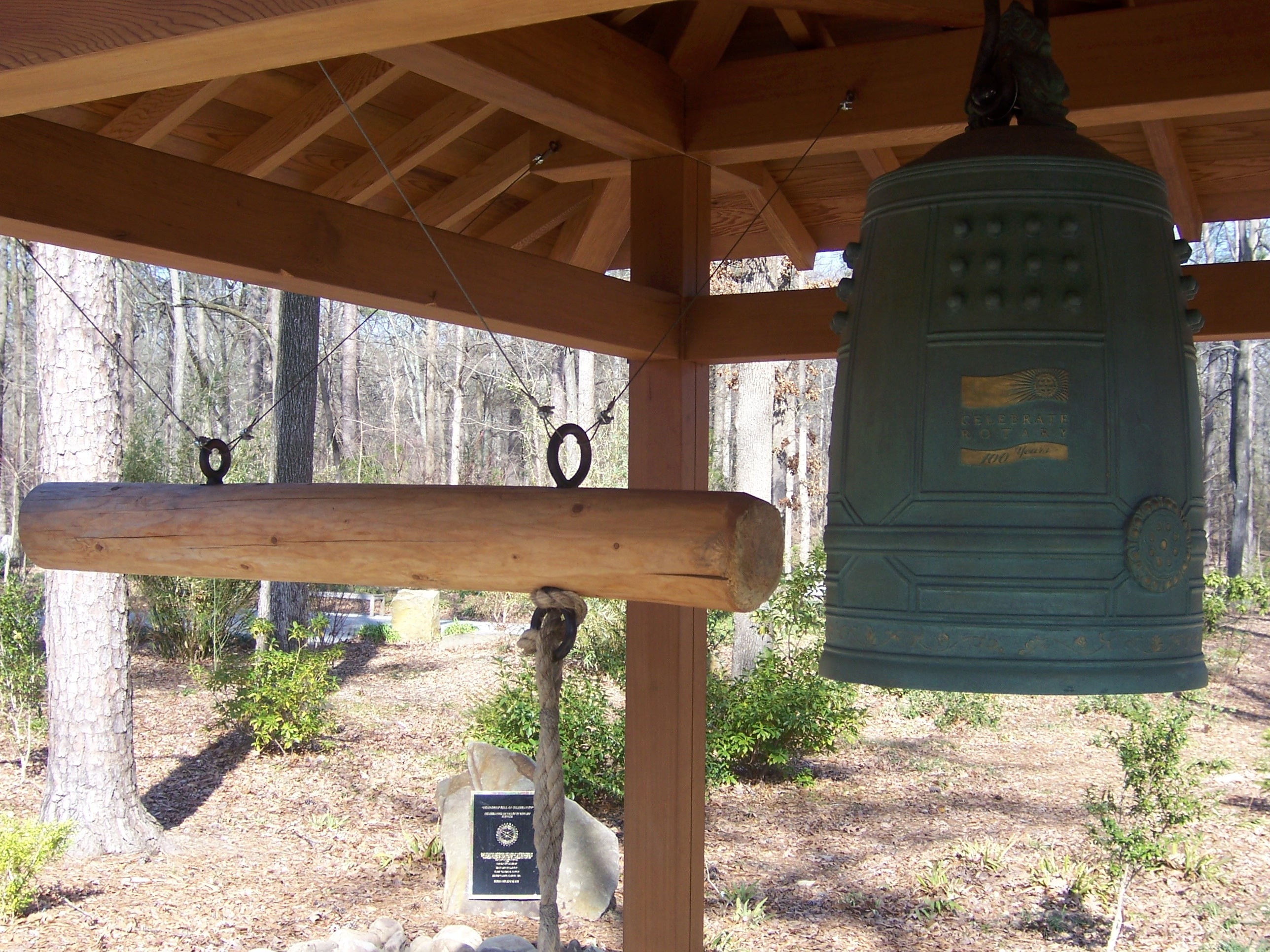
The Friendship Bell

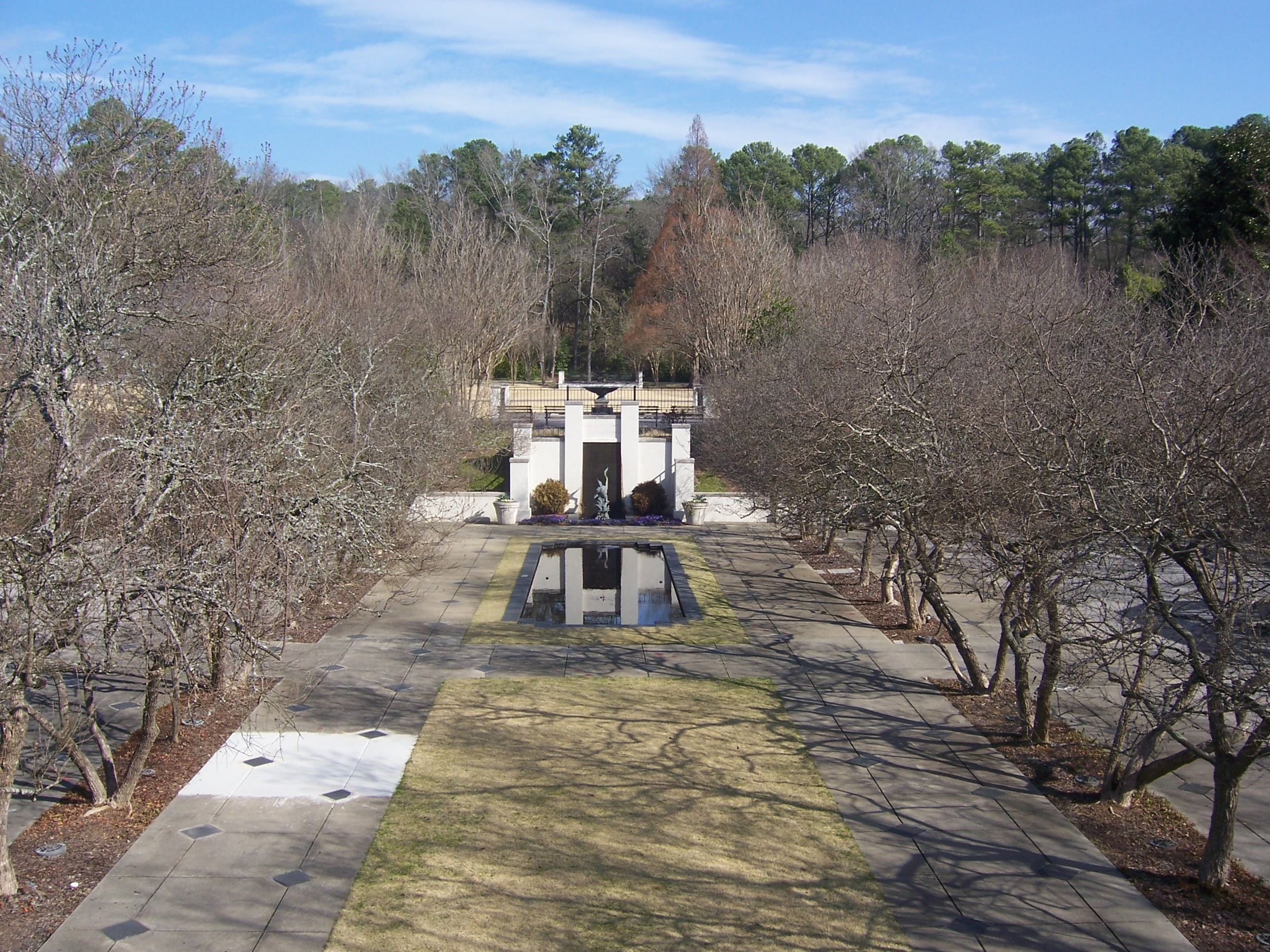
Hill Garden during winter

== See also ==
- List of botanical gardens and arboretums in Alabama
