= Lane Park =

Large park in Birmingham, Alabama, USA

Coordinates: 33°29′14.65″N 86°46′46.52″W

Lane Park is a large park located in Birmingham, Alabama. The park is home to the Birmingham Zoo and the Birmingham Botanical Gardens. The park is located between Mountain Brook and Homewood on the southern slope of Red Mountain and is adjacent to U.S. Highway 280.

== Historical Plaque Information ==
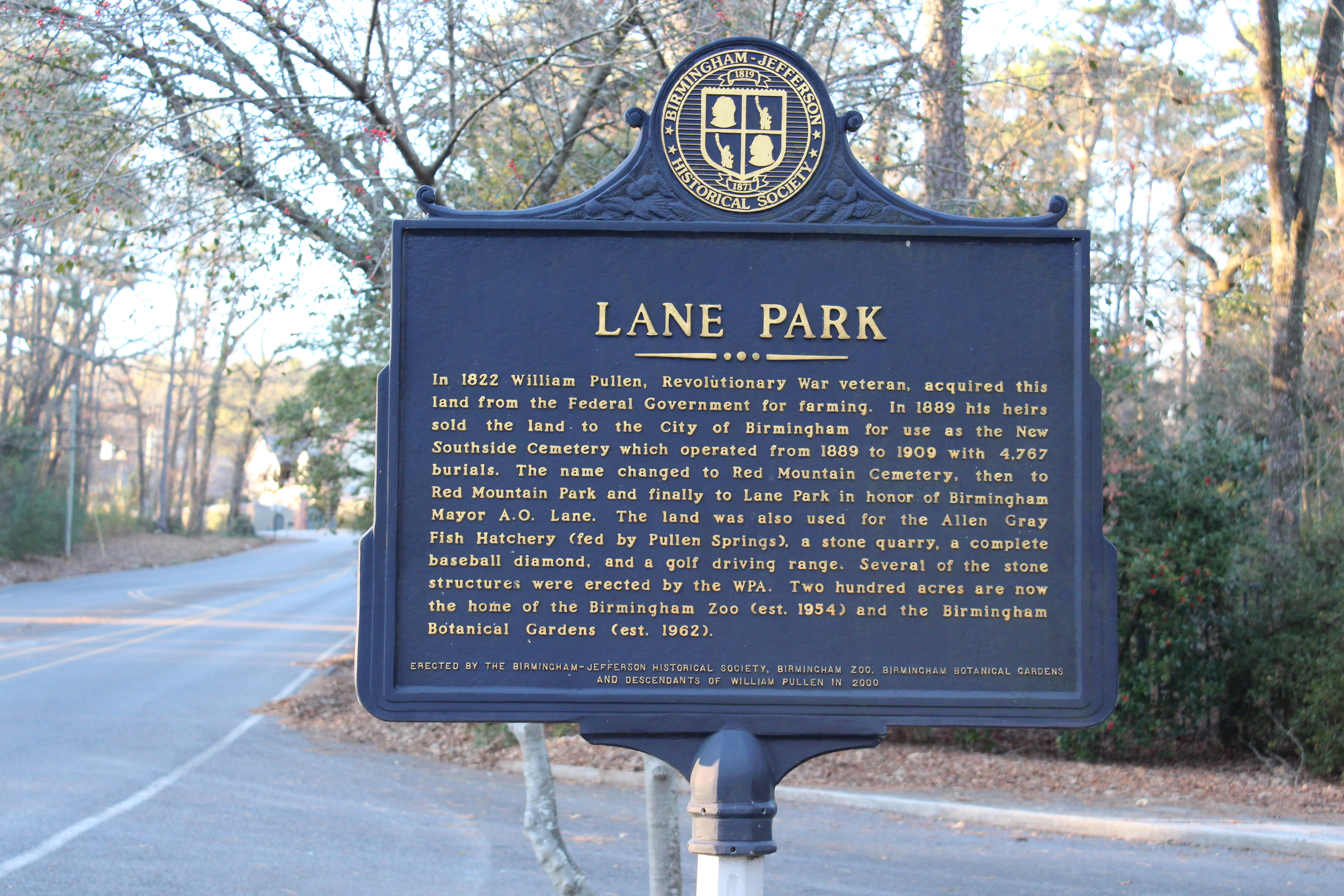
Lane Park Historical Plaque

In 1822 William Pullen, a Revolutionary War veteran, acquired this land from the Federal Government for farming. In 1889 his heirs sold the land to the City of Birmingham for use as the New Southside Cemetery which operated from 1889 to 1909 with 4,767 burials. The name changed to Red Mountain Cemetery, then to Red Mountain Park and finally to Lane Park in honor of Birmingham Mayor A.O. Lane. The land was also used for the Allen Gray Fish Hatchery (fed by Pullen Springs), a stone quarry, a complete baseball diamond, and a golf driving range. Several of the stone structures were erected by the WPA. Two hundred acres are now the home of the Birmingham Zoo (est. 1955) and the Birmingham Botanical Gardens (est. 1962).
