= Bryan =

Bryan may refer to:

== Places in the United States ==
- Bryan, Arkansas, an unincorporated community
- Bryan, Kentucky, an unincorporated community
- Bryan, Ohio, a city
- Bryan, Texas, a city
- Bryan, Wyoming, a ghost town
- Bryan County, Georgia
- Bryan County, Oklahoma
- Bryan Township (disambiguation)
- Lake Bryan, Bryan Texas, a power plant cooling pond

== People ==
- Bryan (given name), a list of people with this name
- Bryan (surname), a list of people with this name

== Schools ==
- Bryan University, Tempe, Arizona, United States, a for-profit private university
- Bryan College, Dayton, Tennessee, United States a private Christian college
- Bryan High School (disambiguation)

== Other uses ==
- Baron Bryan, a baronial title of Plantagenet England
- Bryan Boulevard, Greensboro, North Carolina, United States, limited access highway
- Bryan House (disambiguation)
- Bryan Museum, Galveston, Texas, United States, a museum
- Bryan Tower, Dallas, Texas, an office tower skyscraper

== See also ==
- "Bryan, Bryan, Bryan, Bryan", a 1919 poem by Vachel Lindsay
- Bryan Inc. (2015 TV series) construction and renovation TV series starring Bryan Baeumler
- Bryan, Brown & Company, a footwear company
- Bryan Foods, a subsidiary of Sara Lee
- Bryan Cave, a law firm
- O'Bryan (born 1961), American singer-songwriter
- Bryant (disambiguation)
- Brian (disambiguation)
- Brianna (disambiguation)
- Brianna (given name)
- Bryanne
