= Grancey =

Grancey may refer to:

In places:

- Grancey-le-Château-Neuvelle, a commune in the Côte-d'Or department in eastern France
- Poinson-lès-Grancey, a commune in the Haute-Marne department in northeastern France
- Grancey-sur-Ource, a commune in the Côte-d'Or department in eastern France

In people:

- Edmond de Mandat-Grancey (1842-1911), a French journalist, writer and naval officer
- Galiot Mandat de Grancey (1731-1792), a French nobleman, general and politician
- Jacques Rouxel de Grancey (1603–1680), Marshal of France
- Jacques Eléonor Rouxel de Grancey (1655-1725), Marshal of France
