= Bryan Township, Arkansas =

Bryan Township, Arkansas may refer to:

- Bryan Township, Boone County, Arkansas
- Bryan Township, Greene County, Arkansas
- Bryan Township, Izard County, Arkansas
- Bryan Township, Jackson County, Arkansas
- Bryan Township, Stone County, Arkansas

== See also ==
- List of townships in Arkansas
- Bryan Township (disambiguation)
