= Autricourt =

- Commune
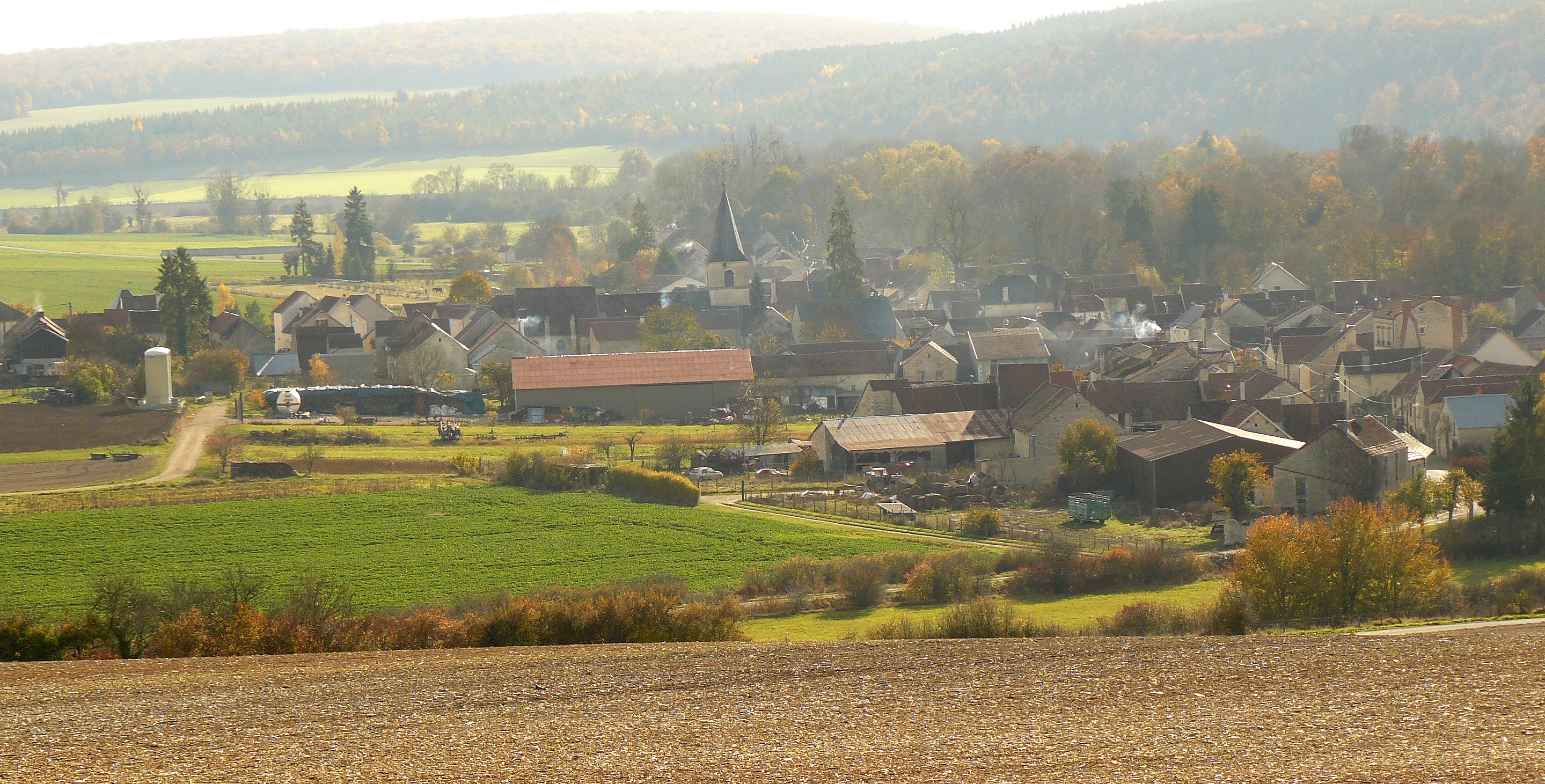
- A general view of Autricourt

- Coat of arms
- Location of Autricourt
- Location within France Location within Bourgogne-Franche-Comté
- Coordinates: 47°59′55″N 4°37′15″E
- Country: France
- Region: Bourgogne-Franche-Comté
- Department: Côte-d'Or
- Arrondissement: Montbard
- Canton: Châtillon-sur-Seine
- Intercommunality: CC Pays Châtillonnais

Government
  - Mayor (2026–32): Thomas Volterrani
- Area^{1}: 26.77 km^{2} (10.34 sq mi)
- Elevation: 203 m (666 ft)
- Highest elevation: 356 m (1,168 ft)
- Lowest elevation: 195 m (640 ft)
- Population (2023): 137
  - Density: 5.12/km^{2} (13.3/sq mi)
- Time zone: UTC+01:00 (CET)
  - Summer (DST): UTC+02:00 (CEST)
- INSEE/Postal code: 21034 /21570
- ^{1} French Land Register data, which excludes lakes, ponds, glaciers > 1 km^{2} (0.386 sq mi or 247 acres) and river estuaries.

Autricourt (French pronunciation: [otʁikuʁ]) is a commune in the Côte-d'Or department in the Bourgogne-Franche-Comté region of eastern France.

== Geography ==
Autricourt is located some 55 km south-east of Troyes and 22 km north by north-east of Châtillon-sur-Seine. The northern border of the commune is the departmental border between Côte-d'Or and Aube. Access to the commune is by the D13 road from Grancey-sur-Ource in the north-west passing through the centre of the commune and the village and continuing south-east to Belan-sur-Ource. Much of the commune in the north and south is heavily forested however the centre of the commune is farmland.

The Ource river flows through the centre of the commune from south-east to north-west before it continues north-west to join the Seine at Merrey-sur-Arce. The Ruisseau de Beaumont flows from the north-east towards the south-west to join the Ource in the commune.

== History ==
The village has Celtic origins with ditches and embankments that have been observed near the present village. In the hamlet of Champigny Gallic tombs have been found. The name Autricourt came from the Frankish era and was the name of a landowner: Auster with curtis meaning "domain". Araound the 11th century a feudal fief was created as evidenced by the presence of the castle and which later came under the rule of the Dukes of Burgundy.

== Administration ==
List of Successive Mayors

| From | To | Name |
|---|---|---|
| 1813 | 1830 | Louis Gautier de Vinfrais |
| 1843 | 1859 | Alexandre de Treil de Pardailhan |
| 2001 | 2008 | Daniel Verpy |
| 2008 | 2020 | Christian Volterrani |
| 2020 | 2026 | Isabelle Roumier |
| 2026 | ---- | Thomas Volterrani |

== Demography ==
The inhabitants of the commune are known as Astricurtois or Astricurtoises in French.

Historical population

| Year | Pop. | ±% p.a. |
|---|---|---|
| 1793 | 822 | — |
| 1821 | 943 | +0.49% |
| 1846 | 959 | +0.07% |
| 1872 | 748 | −0.95% |
| 1901 | 511 | −1.31% |
| 1926 | 356 | −1.44% |
| 1946 | 257 | −1.62% |
| 1962 | 209 | −1.28% |
| 1968 | 160 | −4.35% |

| Year | Pop. | ±% p.a. |
|---|---|---|
| 1975 | 135 | −2.40% |
| 1982 | 126 | −0.98% |
| 1990 | 137 | +1.05% |
| 1999 | 133 | −0.33% |
| 2007 | 117 | −1.59% |
| 2012 | 124 | +1.17% |
| 2017 | 127 | +0.48% |
| 2023 | 137 | +1.27% |

Source: EHESS and INSEE

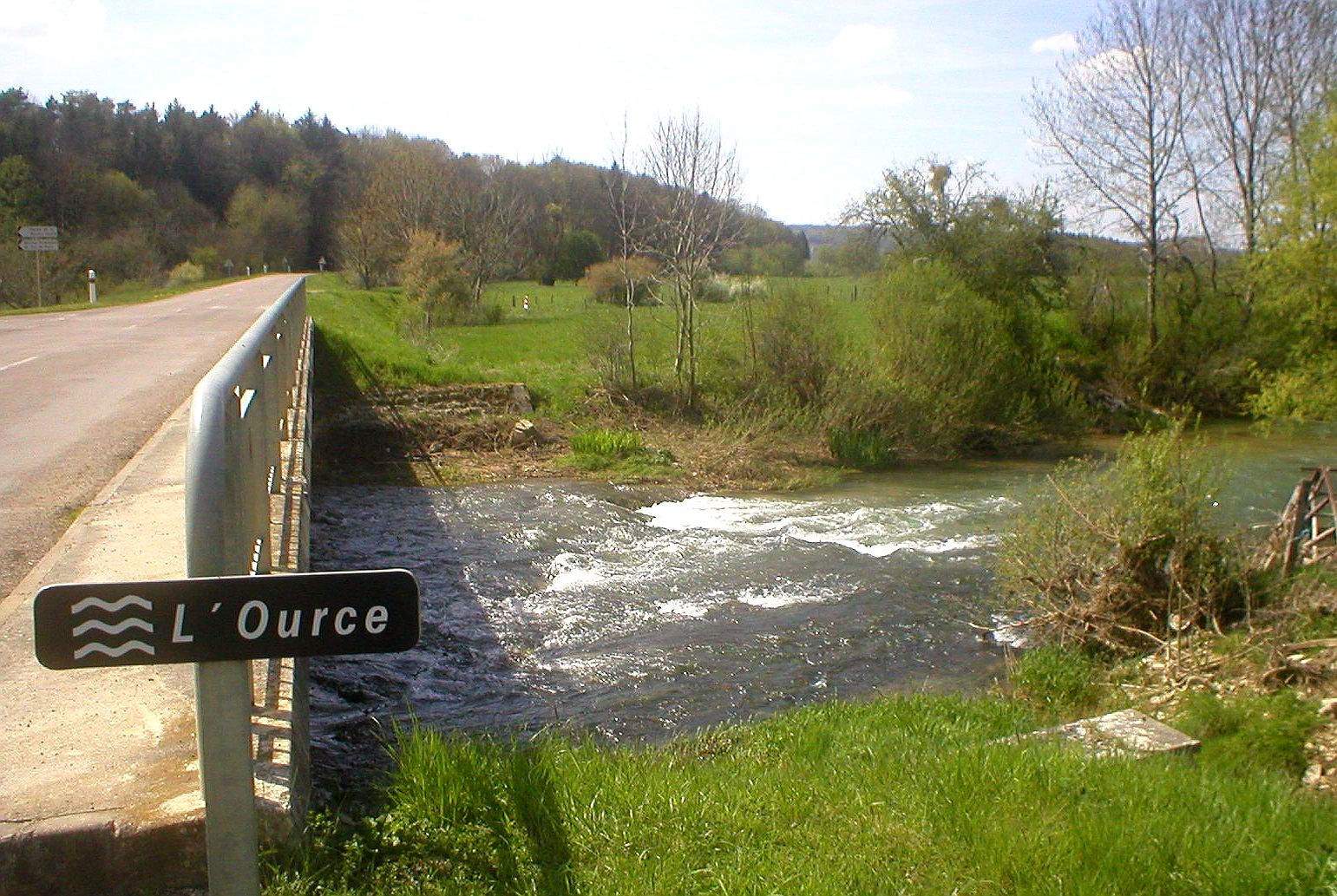
The Ource river at Autricourt

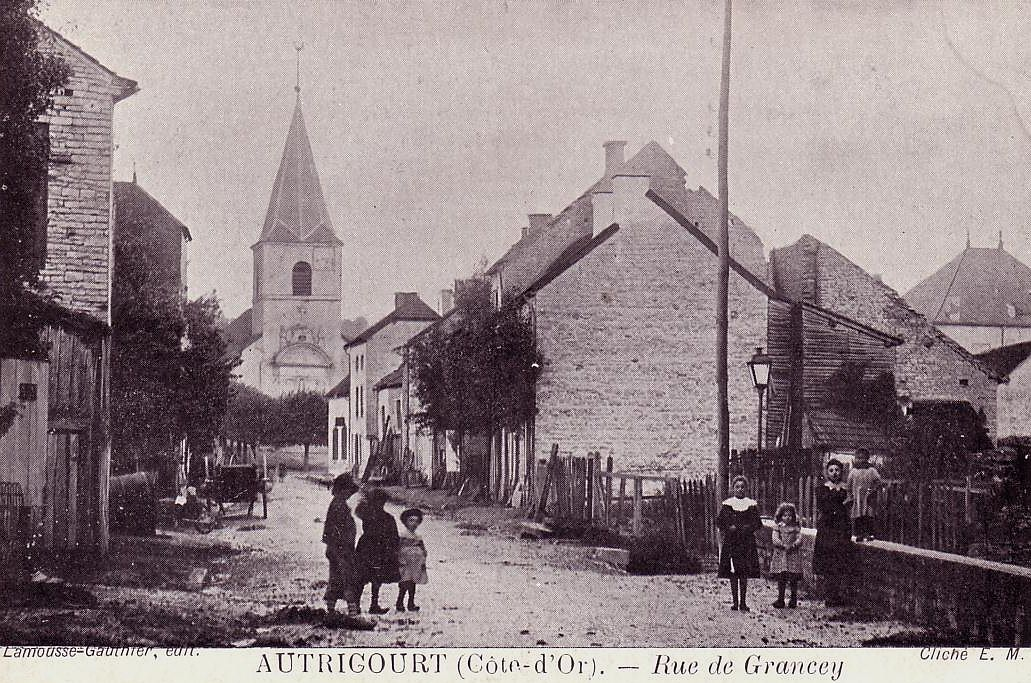
An old postcard of the village in 1910

== Culture and heritage ==
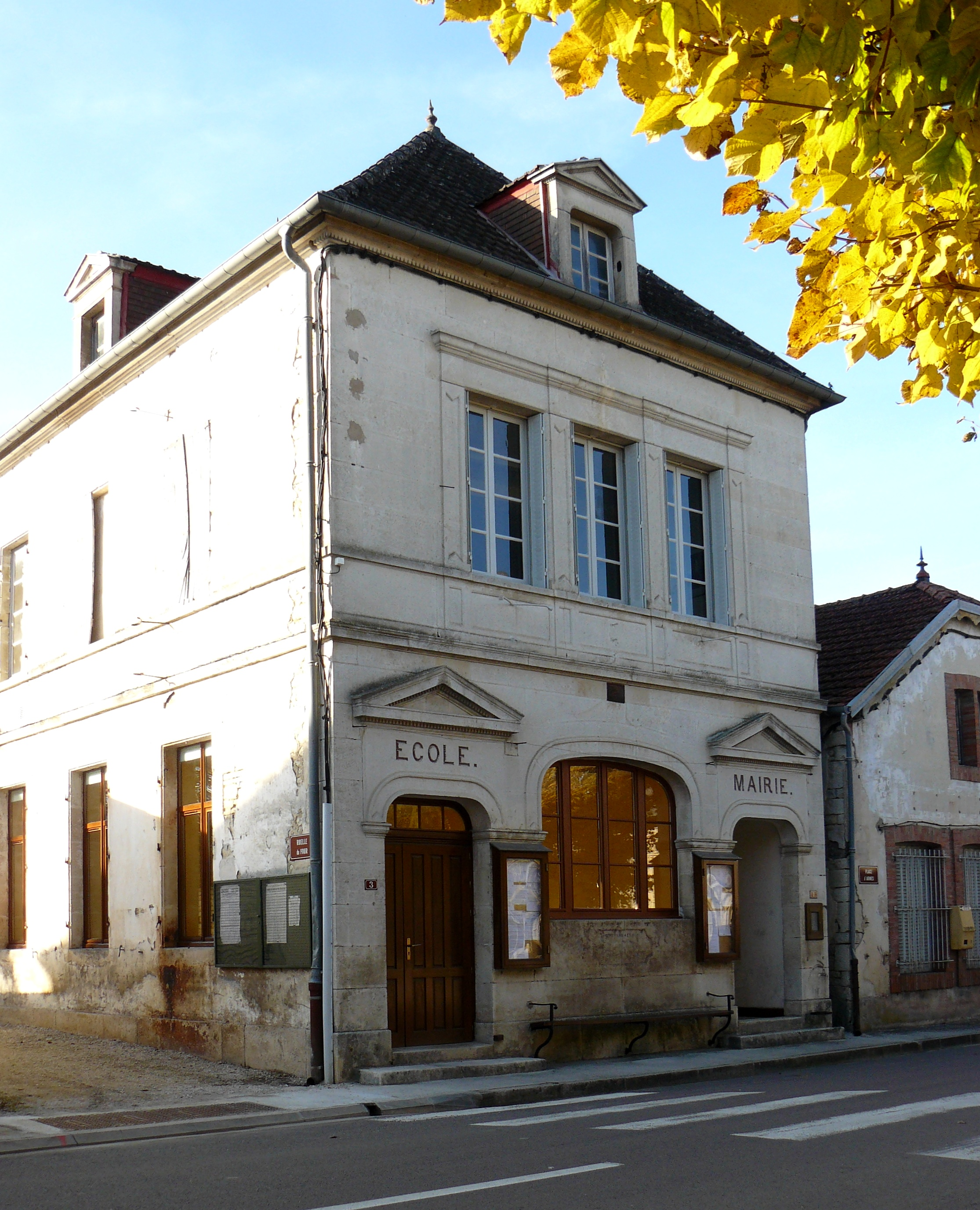
The Town Hall / School

=== Civil heritage ===
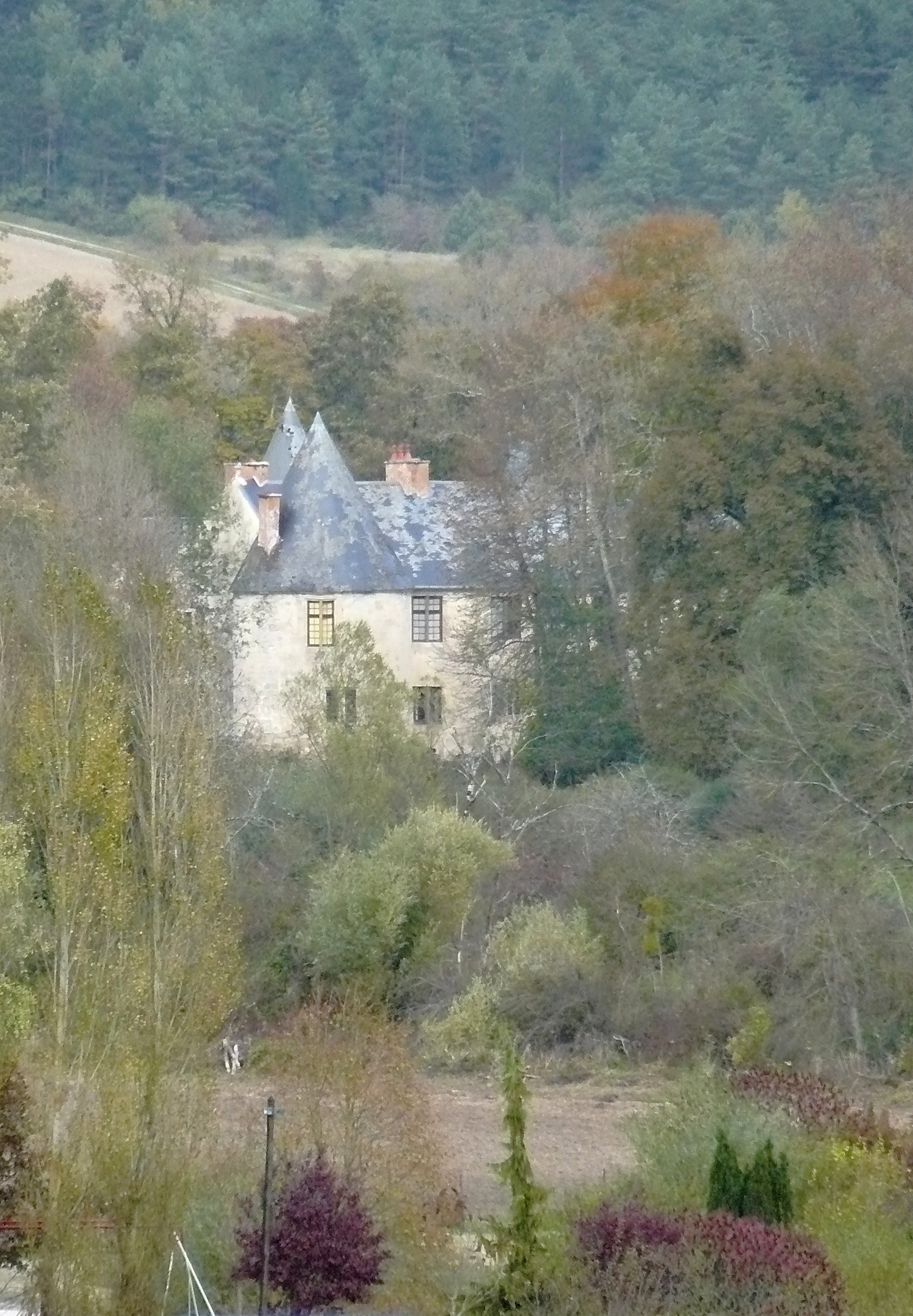
The Chateau

The commune has a number of buildings and structures that are registered as historical monuments:

- The Town Hall / School (1853)
- The Cottenet House (1734)
- A Lavoir (Public laundry) at Ruelle du Four (19th century)
- A Bridge (18th century) (destroyed)
- A Lavoir (Public laundry) (1846)
- A Chateau (14th century). The chateau is in a park in the village centre and is privately owned. The oldest part dates to the end of the 11th century and it is surrounded by a moat fed by a branch of the Ource. The existing building, a lodging flanked by two round towers, dates to the 14th and 16th centuries. Over time it belonged to the lords of Autricourt, Rupt, Anglure, Ligneville, Crillon, Valois, Mursey, and Gaucourt. In 1795 the chateau and its grounds were purchased by Jacques-Alexandre Gautier de Vinfrais, formerly Lord of Villeneuve-le-Roi and of Ablon. In 1809 the chateau was inherited by the Treil de Pardailhan family who have conserved it until recent years.

=== Religious heritage ===
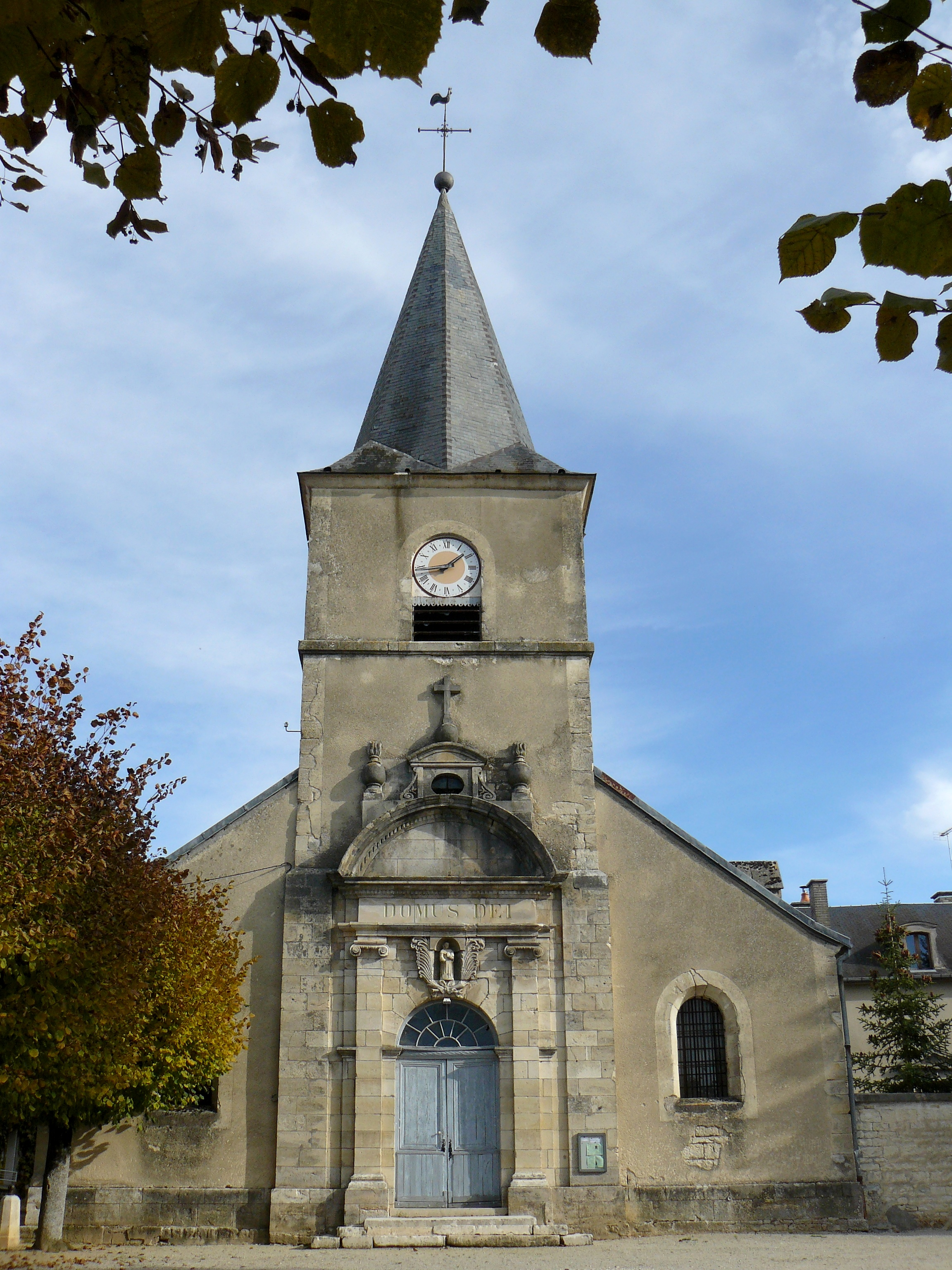
The Church of Saint-Valentin

The commune has many religious buildings and structures that are registered as historical monuments:

- The Parish Church of Saint Valentin (15th century)
- A Monumental Cross (19th century)
- The Church of Saint Valentin excluding the facade and bell tower (16th century)
- A Cemetery Cross (1832)
- A Chapel (19th century)

The Church of Saint-Valentin contains many items that are registered as historical objects:

- The Furniture in the Church
- A Banner (19th century)
- 2 Processional Crosses (18th century)
- 4 Processional Staffs (19th century)
- A Cabinet (18th century)
- A Painting: Saint Anne, Saint Joachim, and the Virgin Mary (17th century)
- A Painting: The Last Supper (17th century)
- A Painting: Donation of the Rosary to Saint Dominique and Saint Catherine of Sienne (17th century)
- A Sculpture: Saint Nicolas (18th century)
- A Statue: Virgin and child (2) (14th century)
- A Statue: Virgin and child (1) (19th century)
- A Statue: Saint Catherine of Alexandria (19th century)
- A Statue: Saint Barbe (15th century)
- A Statue: Saint Valentin of Rome (2) (1793)
- A Statue: Saint Valentin of Rome (1) (1793)
- A Cross: Christ on the Cross (2) (18th century)
- A Cross: Christ on the Cross (1) (17th century)
- The Choir enclosure (18th century)
- The Baptismal font (13th century)
- The Pulpit (18th century)
- The Secondary Altar and Retable (19th century)
- The main Altar, Tabernacle, and altar seating (19th century)

=== Environmental heritage ===
Because of its efforts to raise the quality of its nocturnal environment the commune was labeled a "2 star Village" in 2013. The label is awarded by the National Association for the Protection of the sky and nocturnal environment (ANPCEN) and has 5 levels. A panel is displayed at the entrance to the village to show this distinction.

== Notable people linked to the commune ==
- Louis-Anne Gautier de Vinfrais, Knight of Saint Louis and of the Legion of Honour, arquebus-holder for Louis XVIII and Charles X, admitted to the rank of lieutenant colonel during the Restoration. He was mayor of Autricourt from 1813 to 1830. He was a descendant of Charles Gautier de Vinfrais, an officer of the Royal Hunt.

== See also ==
- Communes of the Côte-d'Or department
