= Brion =

Brion, Brión, or Bríon may refer to:

== Places ==
=== France ===
- Brion, Ain
- Brion, Indre
- Brion, Isère
- Brion, Lozère
- Brion, Saône-et-Loire
- Brion, Vienne
- Brion, Yonne
- Brion-près-Thouet
- Brion-sur-Ource
- Manoir de Brion, a Benedictine priory
- Hôtel Brion, an Art Nouveau hôtel particulier in Strasbourg

=== Elsewhere ===
- Brion Island, Canada
- Brión, a municipality in Galicia, Spain
- Brión Municipality, Miranda, Venezuela

== People ==
- Brión mac Echach Muigmedóin (extant around 362), son of Eochaid Mugmedon
- Brion James, American character actor, starring in Another 48 Hours
- Bríon Saunderson (born 2003), Irish hurler
- Françoise Brion (1933–2025), French film actress
- Friederike Brion, Alsatian muse of Johann Wolfgang von Goethe
- Gustave Brion (1824–1877), French painter and illustrator
- Jon Brion (born 1963), American musician
- Keith Brion (born 1933), American conductor
- Louis Brion de la Tour (1743–1803), French geographer
- Luis Brión (1782–1821), Venezuelan admiral
- Simon de Brion (died 1285), Pope
- Skip Brion, Pennsylvania politician

== Fictional characters ==
- Prince Brion Markov (alias Geo-Force), main character of the Young Justice comic in the third season, "Outsiders"

== See also ==
- Brione (disambiguation)
- Brian (disambiguation)
