= Bar-sur-Seine =

Commune in Grand Est, France

- Commune
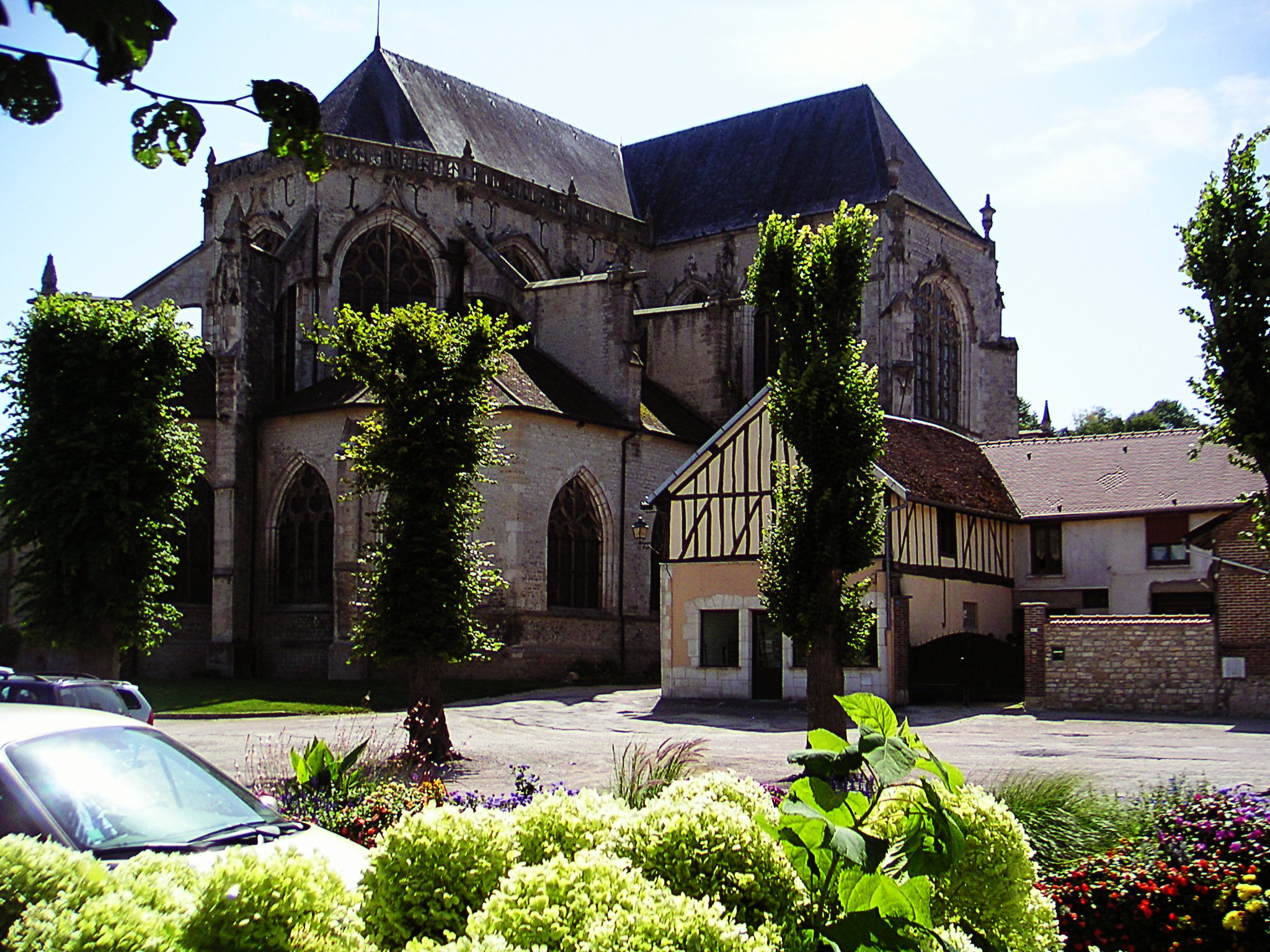
- St Stephen's Church

- Coat of arms
- Location of Bar-sur-Seine
- Location within France Location within Grand Est
- Coordinates: 48°06′53″N 4°22′36″E
- Country: France
- Region: Grand Est
- Department: Aube
- Arrondissement: Troyes
- Canton: Bar-sur-Seine
- Intercommunality: Barséquanais en Champagne

Government
  - Mayor (2020–2026): Dominique Baroni
- Area^{1}: 27.53 km^{2} (10.63 sq mi)
- Highest elevation: 293 m (961 ft)
- Lowest elevation: 147 m (482 ft)
- Population (2023): 2,858
  - Density: 103.8/km^{2} (268.9/sq mi)
- Time zone: UTC+01:00 (CET)
  - Summer (DST): UTC+02:00 (CEST)
- INSEE/Postal code: 10034 /10110
- ^{1} French Land Register data, which excludes lakes, ponds, glaciers > 1 km^{2} (0.386 sq mi or 247 acres) and river estuaries.

Bar-sur-Seine (French pronunciation: [baʁ syʁ sɛn], literally Bar on Seine) is a commune in the Aube department in the Grand Est region of north-central France. In the middle ages it constituted the Châtellenie de Bar-sur-Seine (transl. Castellany of Bar-Sur-Seine).

The inhabitants of the commune are known as Barrois or Barroises and Barséquanais or Barséquanaises.

The commune has been awarded three flowers by the National Council of Towns and Villages in Bloom in the Competition of cities and villages in Bloom.

== Geography ==
Bar-sur-Seine is located some 20 km south-east of Troyes and 25 km north-west of Montliot-et-Courcelles. Access to the commune is by the D671 road from Virey-sous-Bar in the north-west which passes through the town and continues south-east to Celles-sur-Ource. The D443 comes from Magnant in the north-east also passing through the village and continuing south-west to Villemorien. The D63 also goes to Magnant by a slightly longer route. The D4 goes from the town to Ville-sur-Arce in the south-east. The D49 branches from the D443 on the right bank of the Seine and goes north-west to Courtenot. There is also the railway passing through the commune from Saint-Parres-lès-Vaudes in the north-east and continuing to the next station at Polisot in the south-east. Apart from the town there are the hamlets of Avaleur and La Bordé. There are large forests to the north-east and south-west of the town with the rest of the commune farmland.

The Seine river flows through the commune and the town from south-east to north-west and continues north-west to Troyes and beyond. The Ource river flows from the south-east and forms part of the south-eastern border before joining the Seine at the border of the commune. The Arce river joins the Seine on the right bank on the south-eastern border of the commune.

== Toponymy ==
Bar is a Gallic word and perhaps even pre-Gallic which means "summit" or "height".

== History ==
The town was devastated in 1359 by the English, when, according to Froissart, no fewer than 900 mansions were burnt. Afterwards it suffered greatly in the religious wars of the 16th century.

The castellany (French: châtellenie) of Bar-sur-Seine was part of the domains of the Valois dukes of Burgundy from 1435 until it was seized by Louis XI in 1477 following the death of Charles the Bold.

Bar-sur-Seine was the chief town of the district in 1790 and then sub-prefecture from 1800 until 1926.

Bar-sur-Seine minted deniers under Charles the Bald.

Under the Ancien Regime Bar-sur-Seine was located in the province of Burgundy.

Bar-sur-Seine appears as Bar ſur Seine, with a long s, on the 1750 Cassini Map and the same on the 1790 version.

=== Heraldry ===
Arms of Bar-sur-Seine	The official status of the blazon remains to be determined. Blazon: Party per pale, at 1 Gules two barbels addors Or; at 2 Azure, a bend Argent potent counter potent.

== Administration ==
List of Successive Mayors

From	To	Name
	1857	Charles François Bourbonne
2001	2008	Jean Weinling
2008	2020	Marcel Hurillon
2020	2026	Dominique Baroni

=== Education ===
The commune has seven educational establishments:

- Public Kindergarten of 14 July
- Henri Breton private primary school
- Georges Leclerc public primary school
- Maurice Robert public primary school
- Henri Breton College
- Paul Portier College
- Lycée professionnel du Val Moré

== Demography ==
Historical population

Year	Pop.	±% p.a.
1793	2,270	—
1800	2,339	+0.43%
1806	2,200	−1.02%
1821	2,112	−0.27%
1831	2,269	+0.72%
1836	2,350	+0.70%
1841	2,496	+1.21%
1846	2,745	+1.92%
1851	2,469	−2.10%
1856	2,609	+1.11%
1861	2,770	+1.20%
1866	2,920	+1.06%
1872	2,798	−0.71%
1876	2,803	+0.04%
1881	3,092	+1.98%
1886	3,182	+0.58%
1891	3,237	+0.34%
1896	3,157	−0.50%
1901	3,121	−0.23%

Year	Pop.	±% p.a.
1906	3,187	+0.42%
1911	3,107	−0.51%
1921	2,710	−1.36%
1926	2,742	+0.24%
1931	2,651	−0.67%
1936	2,571	−0.61%
1946	2,105	−1.98%
1954	2,422	+1.77%
1962	2,559	+0.69%
1968	2,786	+1.43%
1975	3,155	+1.79%
1982	3,572	+1.79%
1990	3,630	+0.20%
1999	3,510	−0.37%
2007	3,415	−0.34%
2012	3,193	−1.34%
2017	3,018	−1.12%
2023	2,858	−0.90%

Source: EHESS and INSEE

== Economy ==
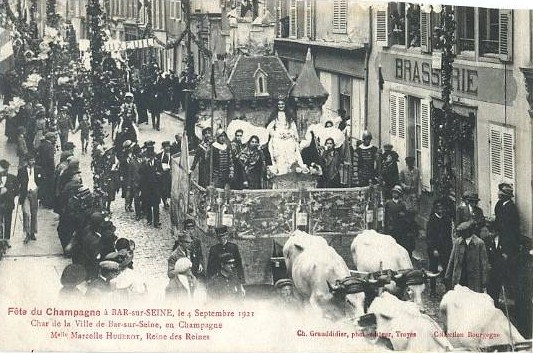
Champagne festival in 1922

Most Champagne vines are grown in the Marne department (on Cretaceous land) in the Marne valley (to the west of Château-Thierry) and on a series of lands straddling the Tertiary and Cretaceous (Avize, Vertus, Sézanne etc.)

Champagnes of Aube are very eccentric and very southern compared to other Champagnes and are grown on Jurassic lands which makes them distinctive. This area of Aube Champagnes includes other neighbouring communes such as Les Riceys and Bar-sur-Aube.

== Culture and heritage ==
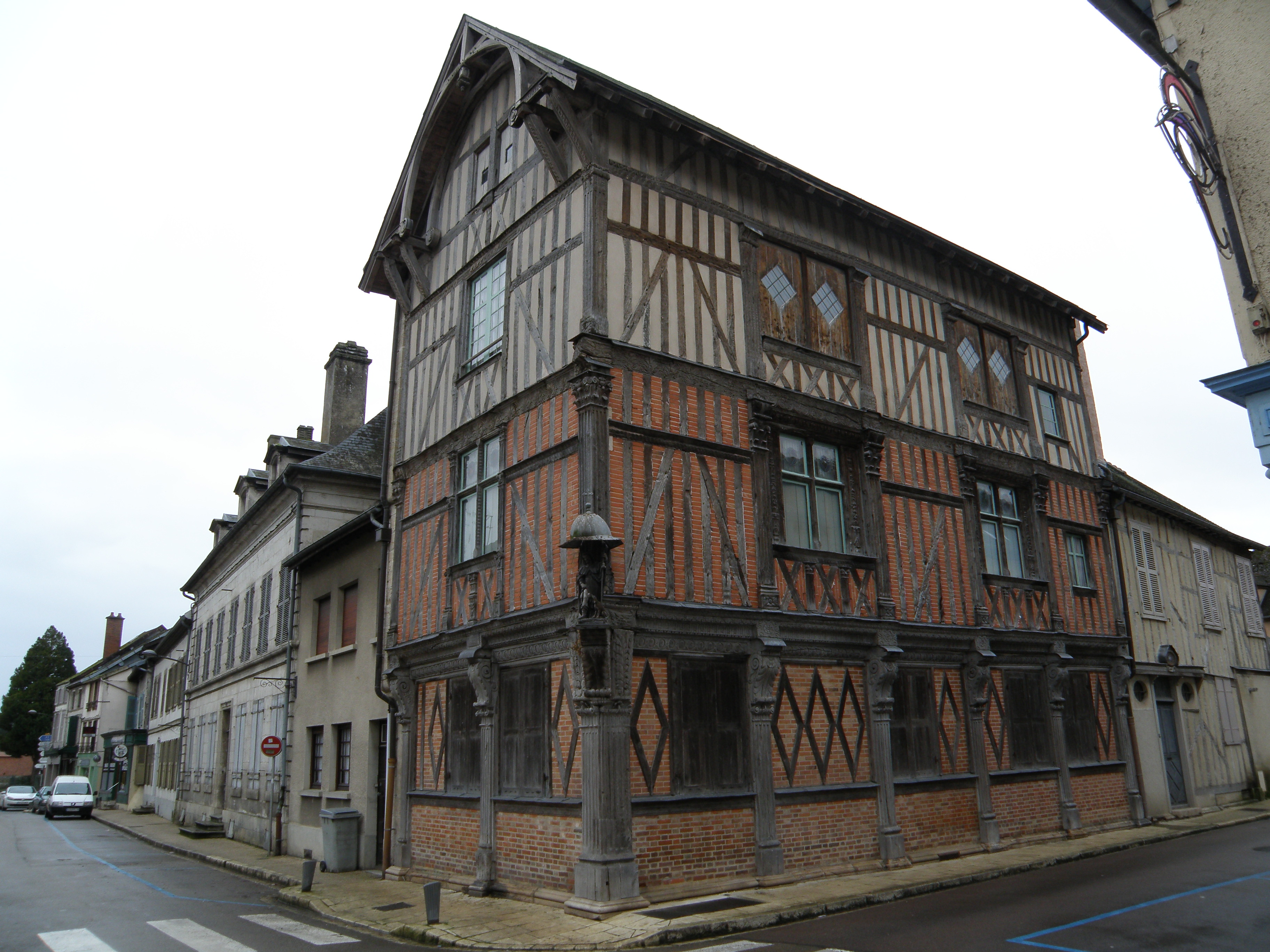
The Timbered House

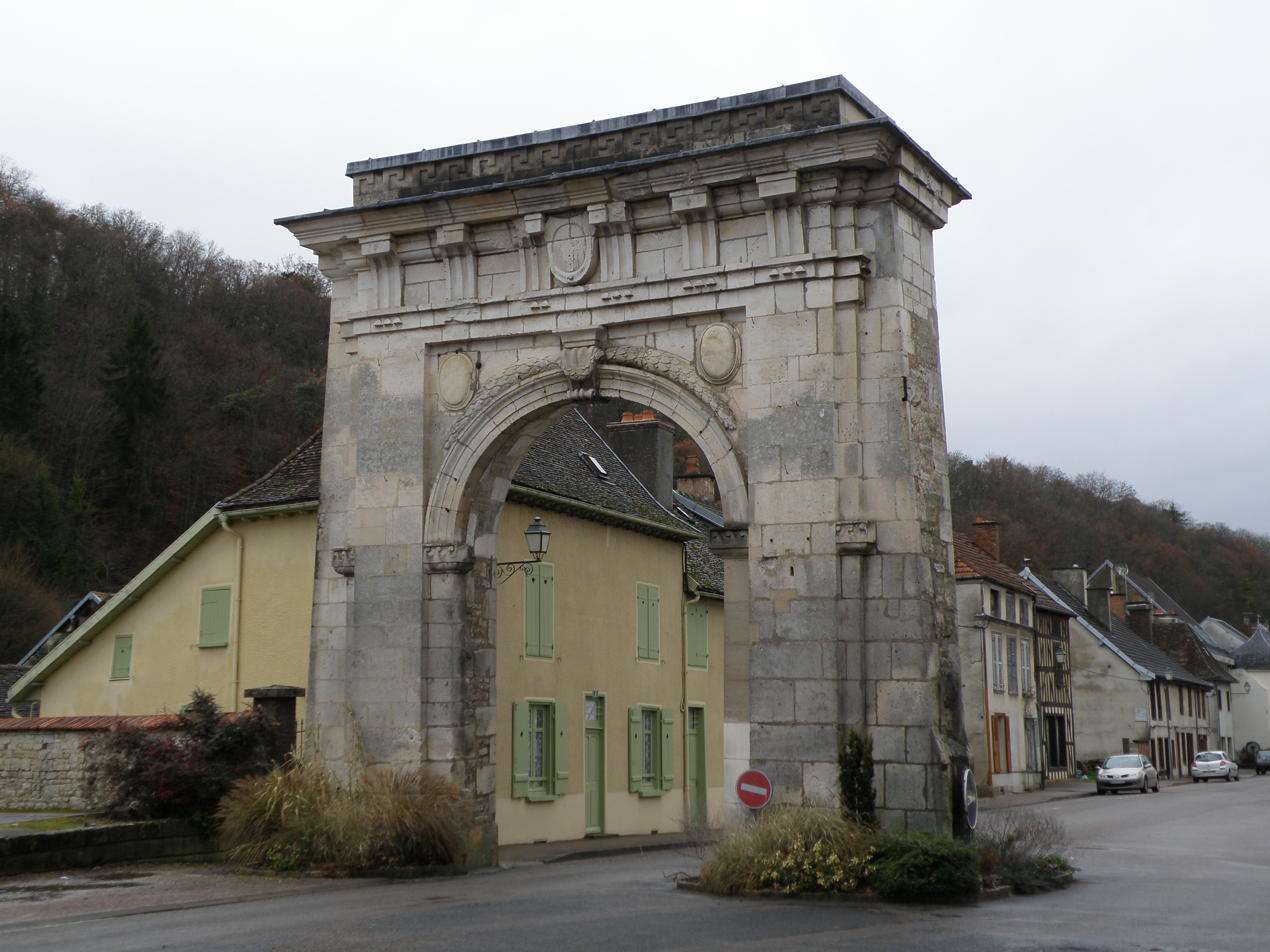
The Portal of Châtillon

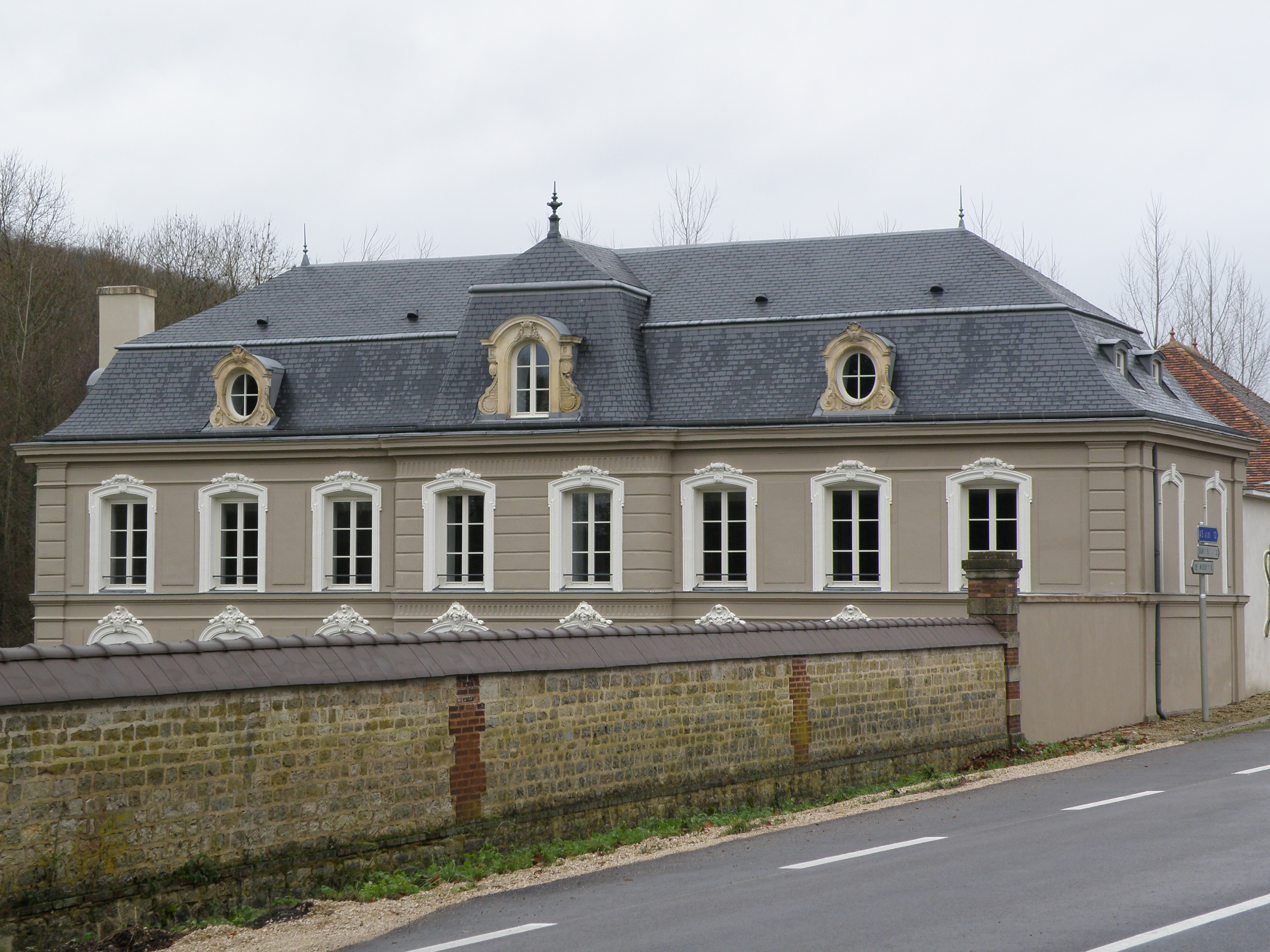
The Chateau of Villeneuve

=== Civil heritage ===
The commune has a number of buildings and sites that are registered as historical monuments:

- The Boulard Stationery factory (19th century)
- The Charrier Mill (19th century)
- The Bar-sur-Seine Glass and Crystal Works (1881)
- A Timbered House at Rue Victor-Hugo (16th century)
- The Domain of Villeneuve at Villeneuve (1874)
- The Portal of Châtillon (17th century)
- The Chateau of the Counts of Bar (13th century)

=== Religious heritage ===
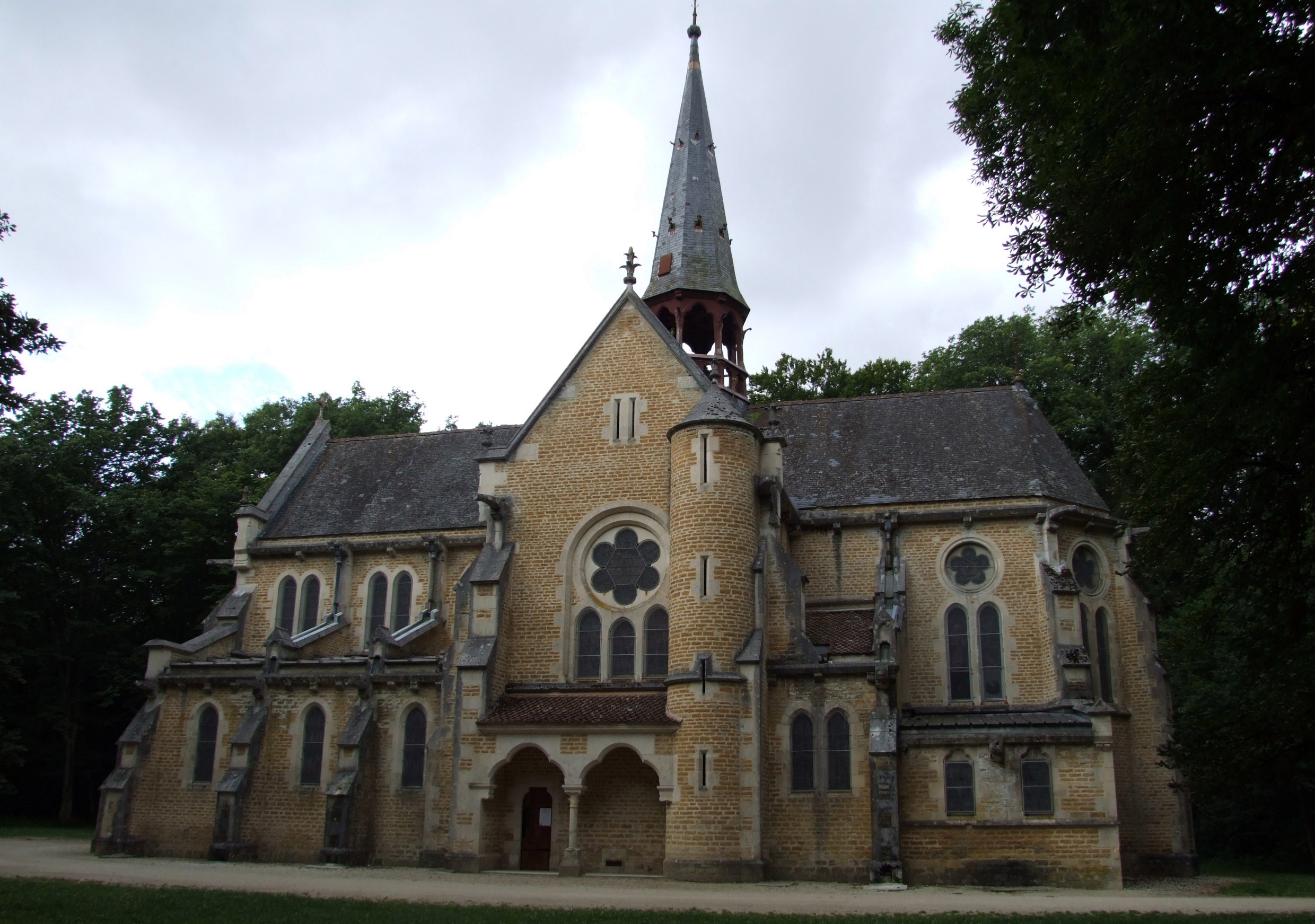
The Chapel of Our Lady of Oak

The commune has two religious buildings and sites that are registered as historical monuments:

- The Church of Saint-Stephen (16th century)
- The Chapel of Avalleur (12th century)

The commune contains over 200 objects that are registered as historical objects. Most of these items are in the Church of Saint Stephen but there are many items in other locations.

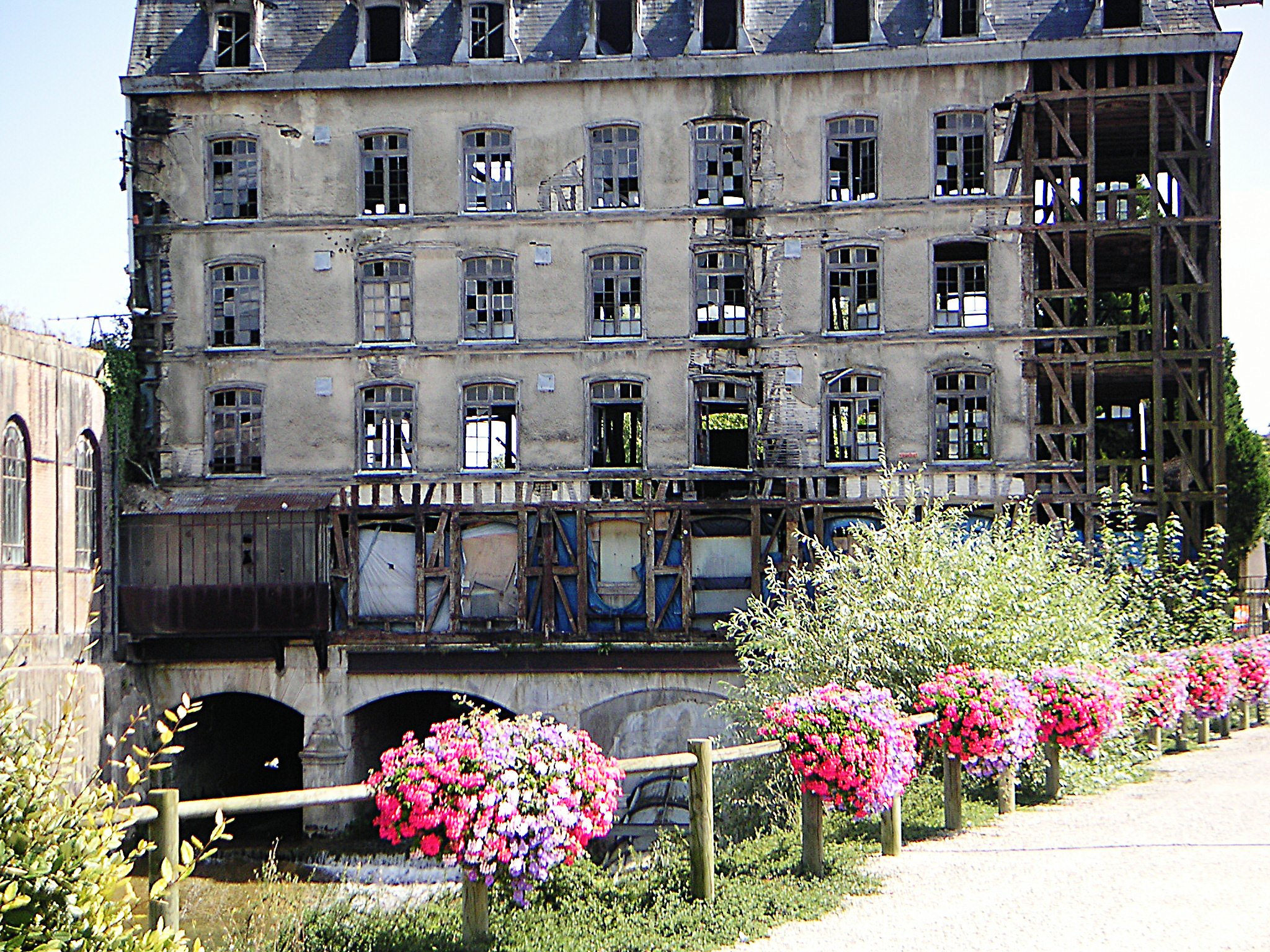
The old Mill

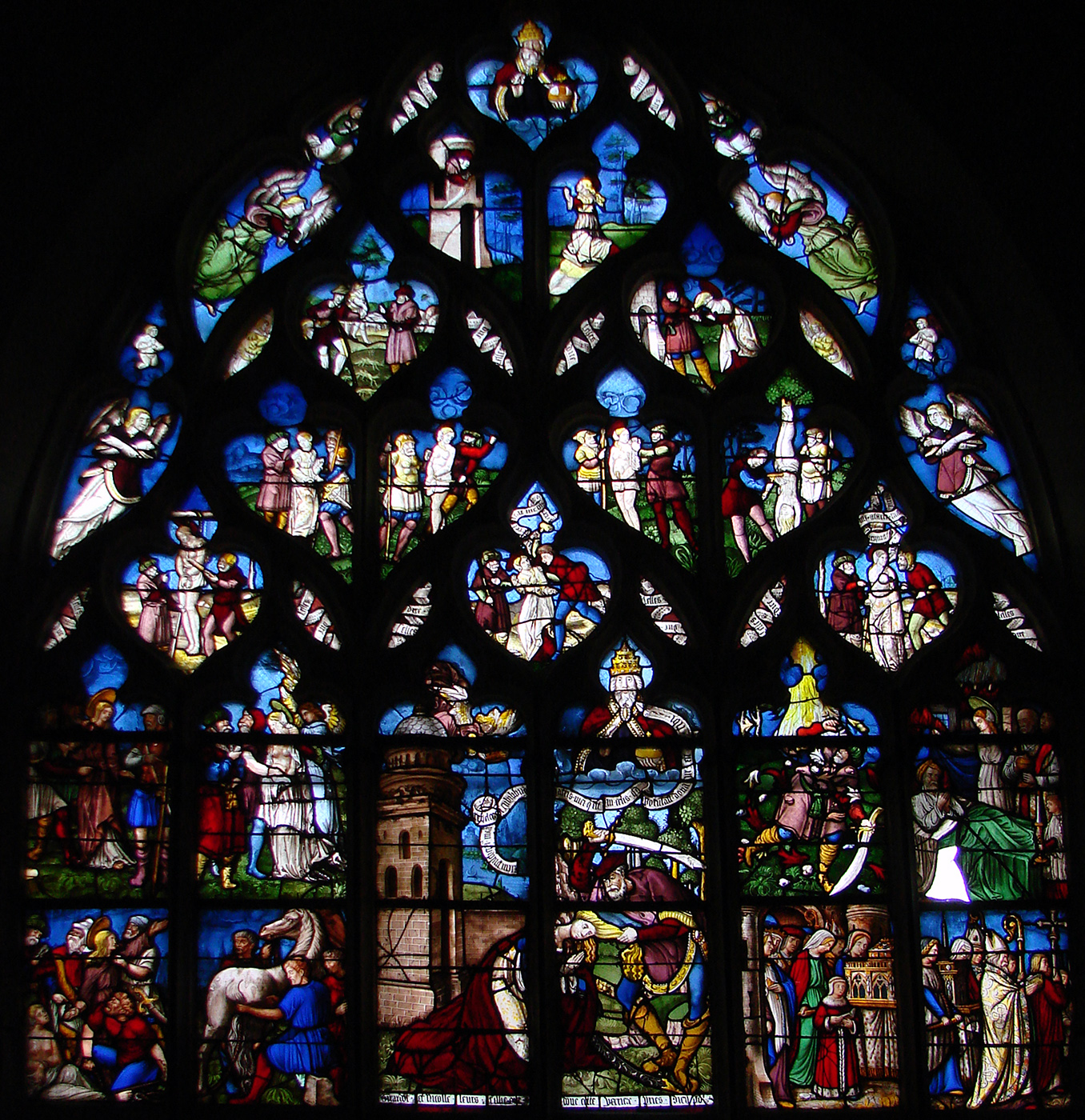
Stained glass in the Church of Saint Stephen

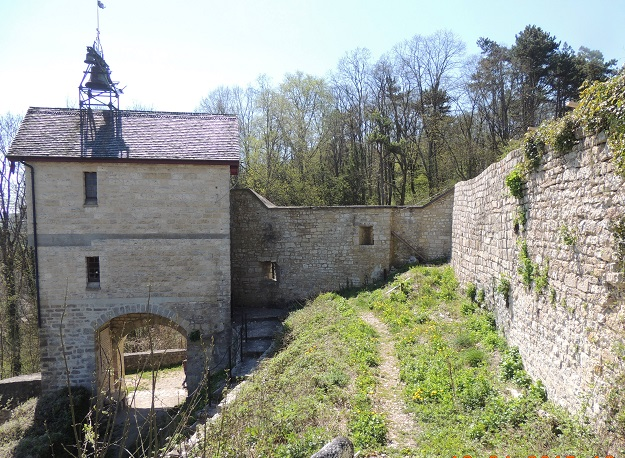
Chateau of the Counts of Bar

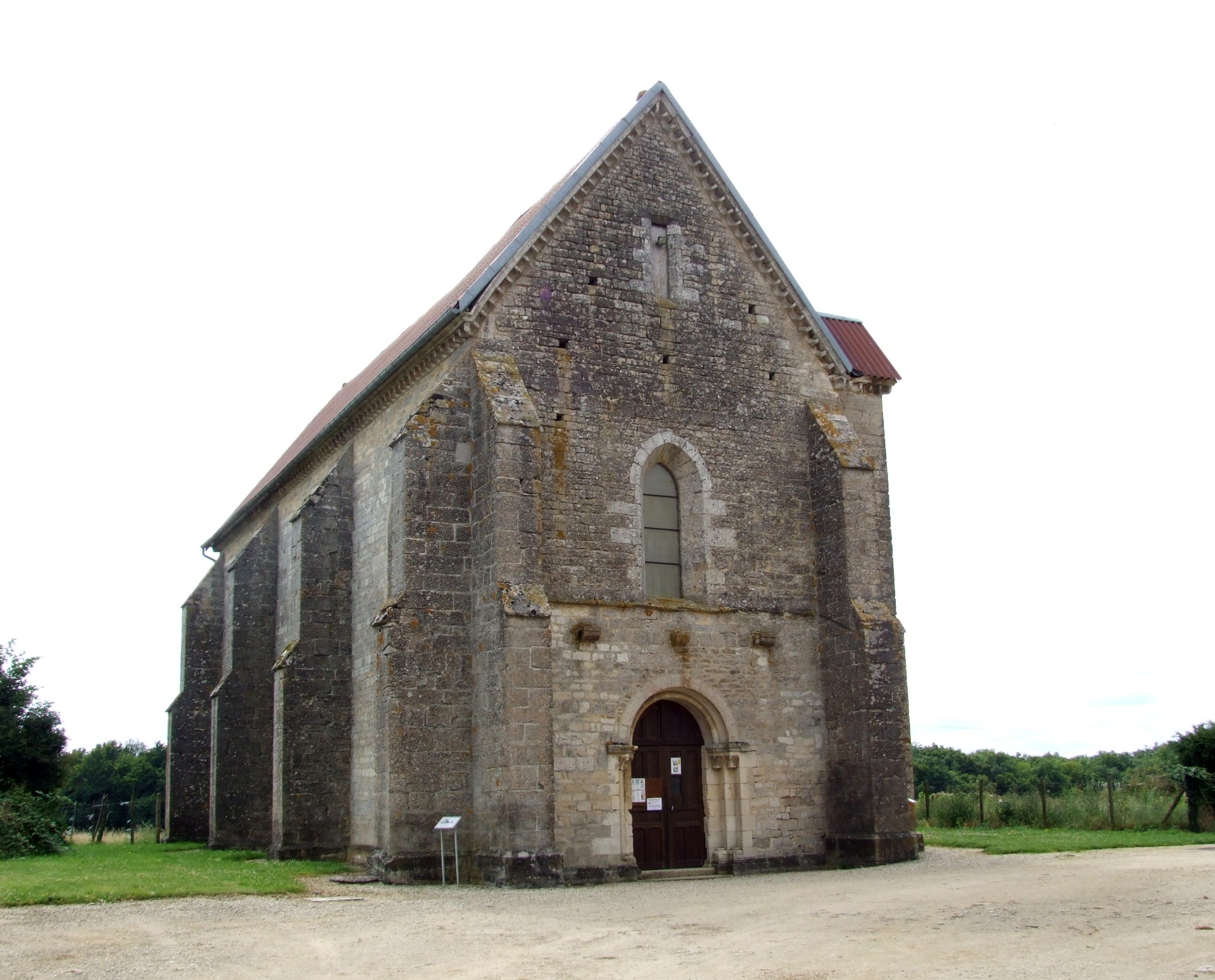
The Templar Commanderie at Avalleur

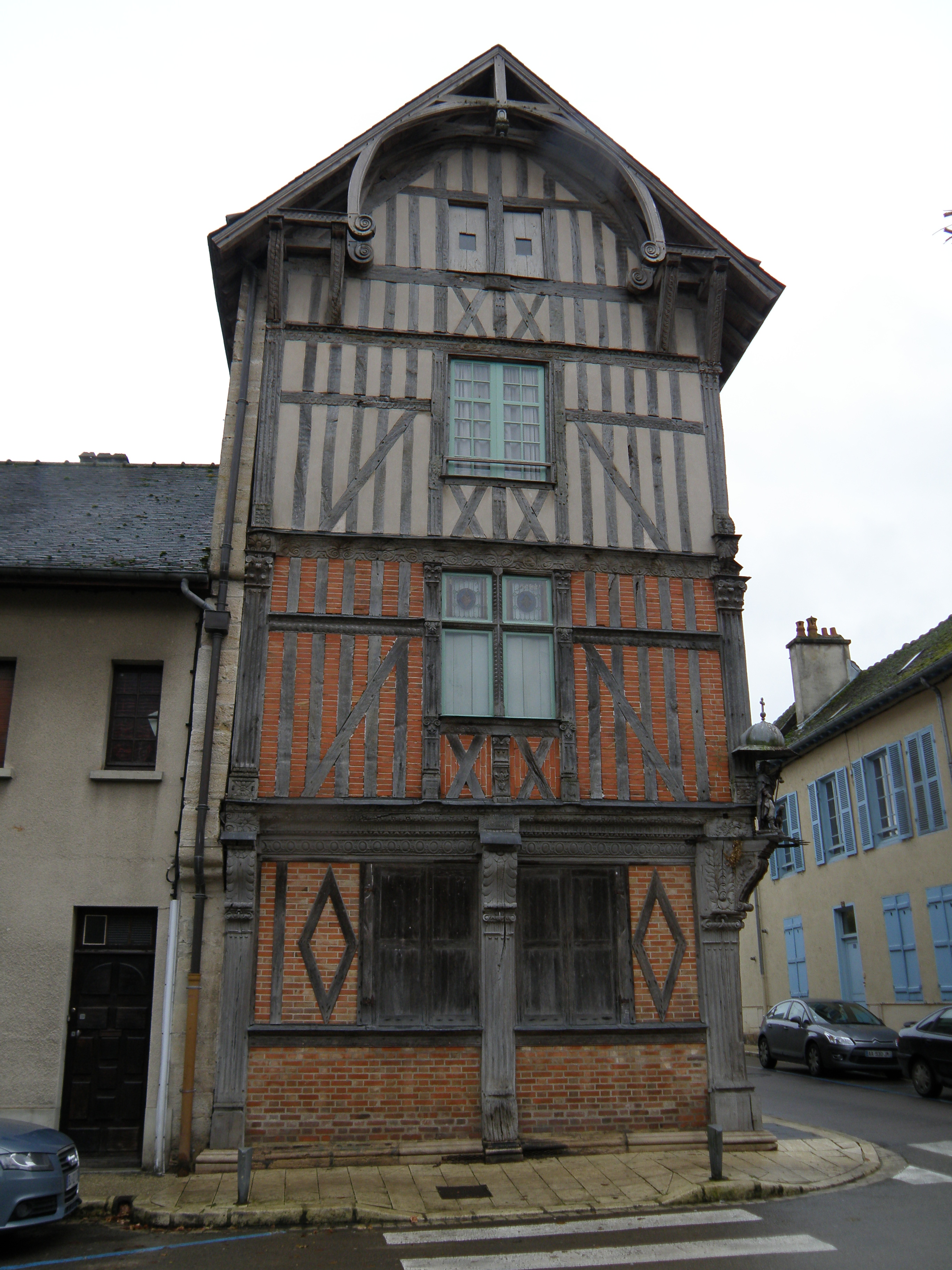
The Timbered House

== See also ==
- Communes of the Aube department
