= Brione =

Brione may refer to the following places:

- Brione, Lombardy, Italy
- Brione, Trentino, Italy
- Brione (Verzasca), Switzerland
- Brione sopra Minusio, Switzerland

== See also ==
- Brion (disambiguation)
- Brioni (disambiguation)
