= Poinson-lès-Grancey =

- Commune
- Location of Poinson-lès-Grancey
- Location within France Location within Grand Est
- Coordinates: 47°42′30″N 4°59′11″E
- Country: France
- Region: Grand Est
- Department: Haute-Marne
- Arrondissement: Langres
- Canton: Villegusien-le-Lac
- Intercommunality: Auberive Vingeanne et Montsaugeonnais

Government
  - Mayor (2020–2026): Jacques Boiget
- Area^{1}: 11.68 km^{2} (4.51 sq mi)
- Elevation: 433 m (1,421 ft)
- Highest elevation: 489 m (1,604 ft)
- Lowest elevation: 369 m (1,211 ft)
- Population (2023): 57
  - Density: 4.9/km^{2} (13/sq mi)
- Time zone: UTC+01:00 (CET)
  - Summer (DST): UTC+02:00 (CEST)
- INSEE/Postal code: 52395 /52160
- ^{1} French Land Register data, which excludes lakes, ponds, glaciers > 1 km^{2} (0.386 sq mi or 247 acres) and river estuaries.

Poinson-lès-Grancey (French pronunciation: [pwɛ̃sɔ̃ lɛ ɡʁɑ̃sɛ], literally Poinson near Grancey) is a commune in the Haute-Marne department in north-eastern France.

== Geography ==
The Ource flows northeastward through the southern part of the commune, then forms its north-eastern border.

== See also ==
- Communes of the Haute-Marne department
