= Brianna (disambiguation) =

Breanna, Breanne, Briana, Briána or Brianna may refer to:

== People ==
- Brianna, a list of people with the given name or spelling variations thereof
- Brianna Perry, American rapper who also performs under the mononym Brianna

== Fictional characters ==
- Breanna Barnes (One on One character), a main character in the American sitcom One on One
- Brianna Maxwell, from the book series Dork Diaries
- Breanna Timmins or Bree Timmins, on the Australian soap opera Neighbours
- Brianna (Inkworld), Dustfinger's daughter in the Inkworld trilogy
- The "Last Handmaiden" on a Jedi Academy in Star Wars: Knights of the Old Republic II – The Sith Lords

== Other uses ==
- Briána (Barbus prespensis), a species of ray-finned fish in the family Cyprinidae

== See also ==
- Brianne, a list of people with the given name
- Llyn Brianne, a man-made lake or reservoir in central Wales
- Breona (disambiguation)
- Bree (disambiguation)
- Brian (disambiguation)
