= Galveston Orphans Home =

- U.S. National Register of Historic Places
- Recorded Texas Historic Landmark
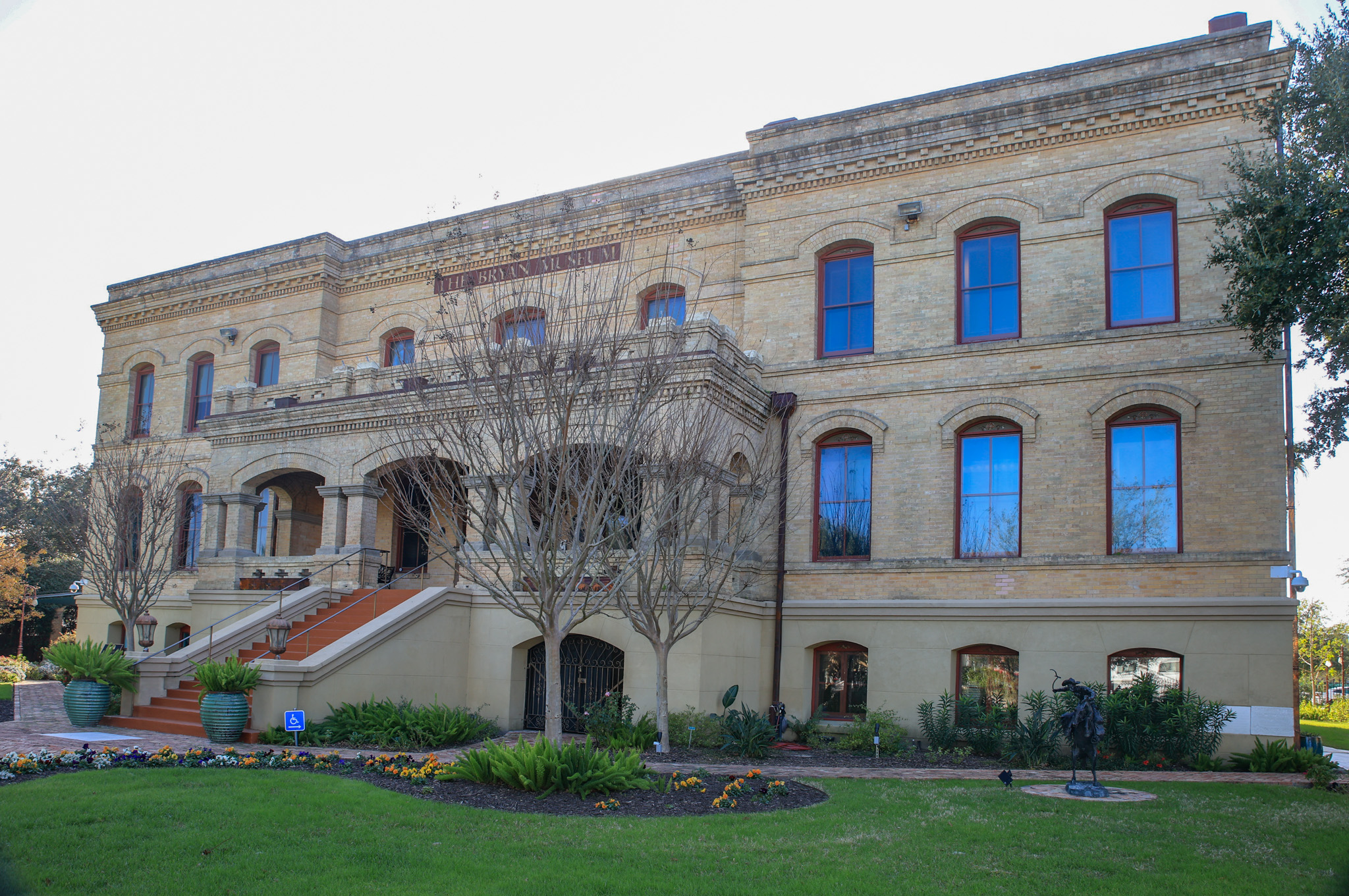
- Galveston Orphans Home in 2024

- Location within Texas Location within the United States
- Location: 1315 21st St., Galveston, Texas
- Coordinates: 29°17′50″N 94°47′19″W
- Area: less than one acre
- Built: 1902
- Architect: Alfred Muller
- Architectural style: Renaissance, Eclectic
- NRHP reference No.: 79002943
- RTHL No.: 7458

Significant dates
- Added to NRHP: March 21, 1979
- Designated RTHL: 2015

Galveston Orphans Home, also known as Galveston Children's Home, was founded in 1878 by George Dealey (1829–1891).

George Dealey established the Galveston Orphan's home in 1878. Already serving forty children the next year, control of the home was conveyed to a newly formed board. Then known as the "Island City Protestant-Israelite Orphans Home," the board re-organized in 1880 as a Protestant entity, with Moritz Kopperl chairing and Hallie Patrick Jack Ballinger serving as director.

The home was moved to this location in Galveston, Texas in 1880. The original Gothic revival building was constructed from 1894–1895 with funding from Henry Rosenberg. It was destroyed by the storm of 1900 and newspaper publisher William Randolph Hearst hosted a charity bazaar at the Waldorf-Astoria Hotel in New York City to raise funds for a rebuild. It was completed in 1902. The building was listed on the National Register of Historic Places on March 21, 1979. It is located at 1315 21st Street.

J.P. Bryan, a retired Texas oilman, purchased the Galveston Orphans Home on October 11, 2013 and thoroughly restored the building. The Bryan Museum opened its doors to the public in June 2015.

== See also ==
- National Register of Historic Places listings in Galveston County, Texas
- Recorded Texas Historic Landmarks in Galveston County

== Bibliography ==
- Beasley, Ellen; Fox, Stephen (1996). Galveston Architectural Guidebook. Houston: Rice University Press. ISBN 0-89263-345-X.
