= Bryan High School =

Bryan High School may refer to:

- Bryan High School (Ohio), located in Bryan, Ohio
- Bryan High School (Texas), located in Bryan, Texas
- Omaha Bryan High School in Omaha, Nebraska

== See also ==
- Bryan Station High School in Lexington, Kentucky
- Bryant High School (disambiguation)
