= Belan-sur-Ource =

- Commune
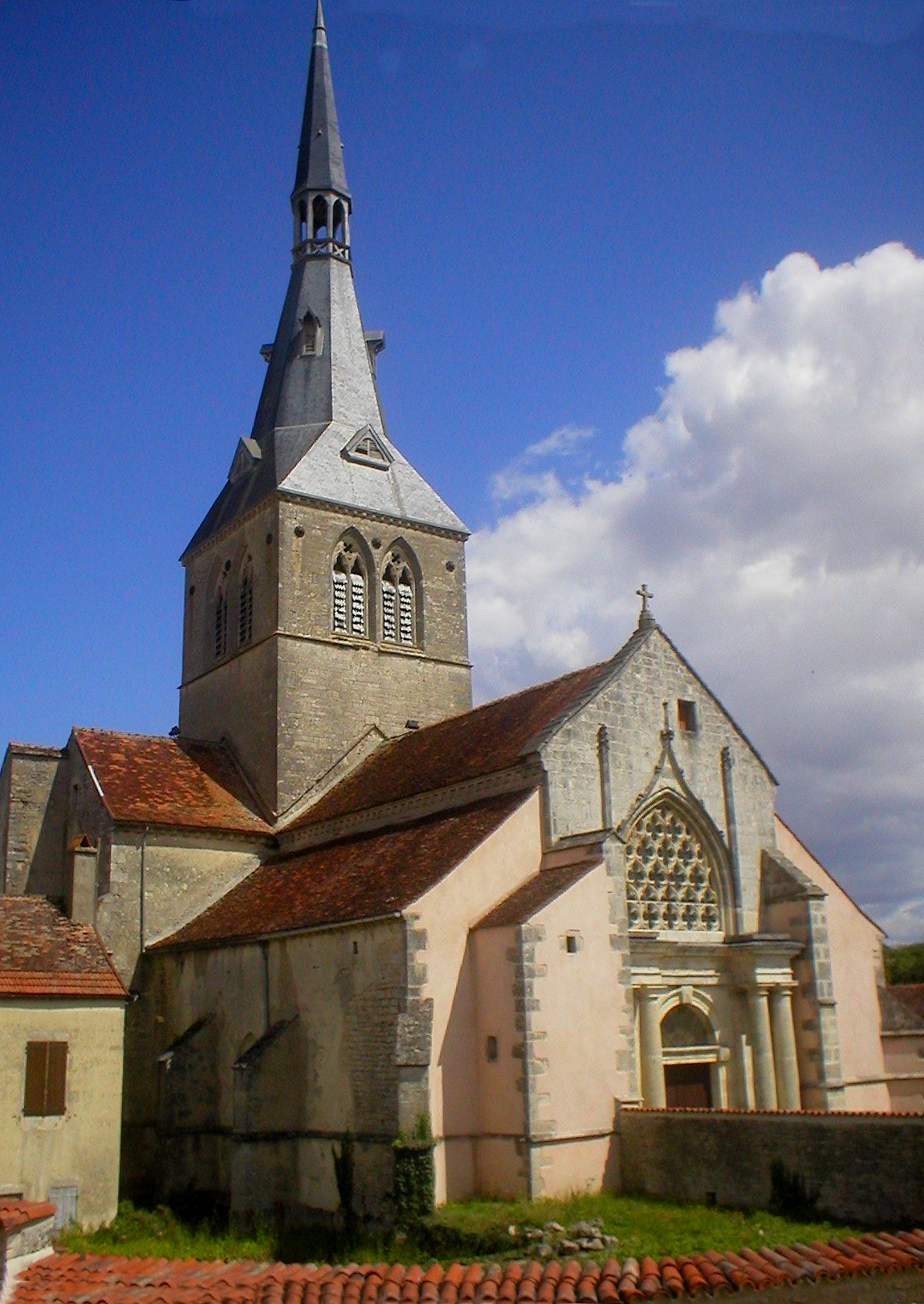
- The church in Belan-sur-Ource

- Coat of arms
- Location of Belan-sur-Ource
- Location within France Location within Bourgogne-Franche-Comté
- Coordinates: 47°56′45″N 4°39′15″E
- Country: France
- Region: Bourgogne-Franche-Comté
- Department: Côte-d'Or
- Arrondissement: Montbard
- Canton: Châtillon-sur-Seine
- Intercommunality: Pays Châtillonnais

Government
  - Mayor (2020–2026): Thierry Naudinot
- Area^{1}: 20.44 km^{2} (7.89 sq mi)
- Elevation: 215 m (705 ft)
- Highest elevation: 338 m (1,109 ft)
- Lowest elevation: 202 m (663 ft)
- Population (2023): 220
  - Density: 11/km^{2} (28/sq mi)
- Time zone: UTC+01:00 (CET)
  - Summer (DST): UTC+02:00 (CEST)
- INSEE/Postal code: 21058 /21570
- ^{1} French Land Register data, which excludes lakes, ponds, glaciers > 1 km^{2} (0.386 sq mi or 247 acres) and river estuaries.

Belan-sur-Ource (French pronunciation: [bəlɑ̃ syʁ uʁs], literally Belan on Ource) is a commune in the Côte-d'Or department in eastern France.

== Population ==
Historical population
Year	Pop.	±% p.a.
1968	376	—
1975	332	−1.76%
1982	322	−0.44%
1990	317	−0.20%
1999	293	−0.87%
2007	265	−1.25%
2012	274	+0.67%
2017	252	−1.66%
2023	220	−2.24%
Source: INSEE

== See also ==
- Communes of the Côte-d'Or department
