= Brioni =

Brioni may refer to:

- Brioni Islands, a group of Adriatic islands in Croatia, also known as Brijuni
- Brioni (brand), a fashion house

== See also ==
- Brioni Agreement
- Brioni Meeting
- Brione (disambiguation)
