= Breona =

Breona may refer to:

- Breona, Tasmania, rural locality in Australia
- Couronne de Bréona, mountain of the Pennine Alps in Switzerland

== See also ==
- Breonna Taylor, African-American fatally shot by police
- Brianna (disambiguation)
