= Recey-sur-Ource =

- Commune
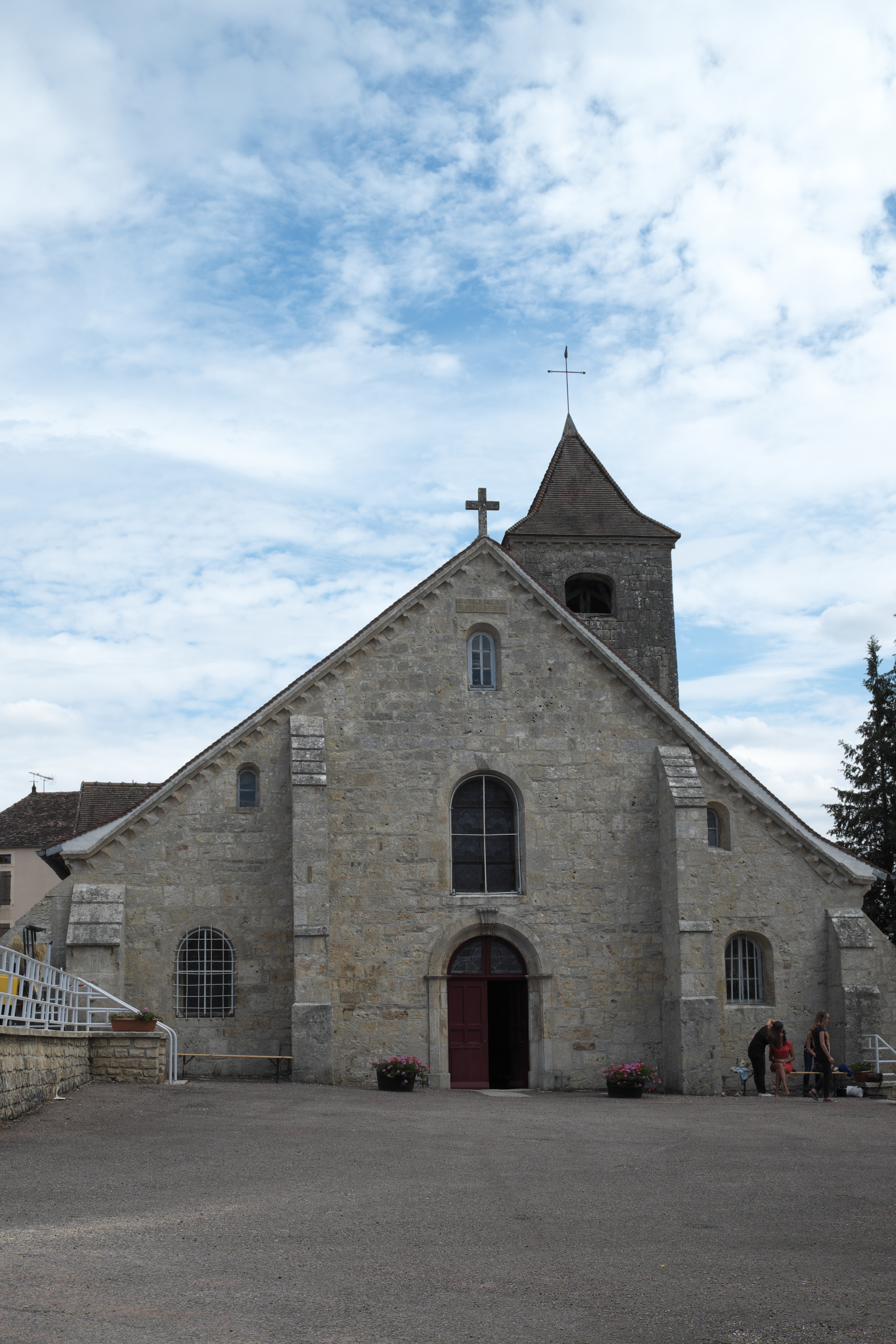
- The church in Recey-sur-Ource

- Coat of arms
- Location of Recey-sur-Ource
- Location within France Location within Bourgogne-Franche-Comté
- Coordinates: 47°46′51″N 4°51′40″E
- Country: France
- Region: Bourgogne-Franche-Comté
- Department: Côte-d'Or
- Arrondissement: Montbard
- Canton: Châtillon-sur-Seine

Government
  - Mayor (2020–2026): Laurent Schembri
- Area^{1}: 26.69 km^{2} (10.31 sq mi)
- Elevation: 310 m (1,020 ft)
- Highest elevation: 442 m (1,450 ft)
- Lowest elevation: 280 m (920 ft)
- Population (2023): 334
  - Density: 12.5/km^{2} (32.4/sq mi)
- Time zone: UTC+01:00 (CET)
  - Summer (DST): UTC+02:00 (CEST)
- INSEE/Postal code: 21519 /21290
- ^{1} French Land Register data, which excludes lakes, ponds, glaciers > 1 km^{2} (0.386 sq mi or 247 acres) and river estuaries.

Recey-sur-Ource (French pronunciation: [ʁəsɛ syʁ uʁs]) is a commune in the Côte-d'Or department in eastern France.

== Geography ==
The village lies in the middle of the commune, on the right bank of the Ource, which flows northwest through the middle of the commune.

== Population ==
Historical population
Year	Pop.	±% p.a.
1968	662	—
1975	542	−2.82%
1982	498	−1.20%
1990	461	−0.96%
1999	431	−0.74%
2007	394	−1.12%
2012	375	−0.98%
2017	363	−0.65%
2023	334	−1.38%
Source: INSEE

== International relations ==
The commune is twinned with Nieder-Olm, Germany.

== Personalities ==
It was the birthplace of Jean-Baptiste Henri Lacordaire (1802-1861), ecclesiastic and orator.

== See also ==
- Communes of the Côte-d'Or department
