= Bryan Museum =

The Bryan Museum
- Established: 2015
- Location: 1315 21st Street, Galveston, Texas
- Coordinates: 29°17′51″N 94°47′20″W
- Type: Local history and art museum
- Key holdings: Art and artifacts of Texas and the American West
- Founder: J.P. Bryan
- Director: Melissa Williams Murphy
- Website: thebryanmuseum.org

Opened in 2015, The Bryan Museum, located in the historic Galveston Orphans Home in Galveston, Texas, U.S., houses The Bryan Collection, one of the world's largest collections of historical artifacts, documents, and artwork relating to Texas and the American West. Assembled by J.P. and Mary Jon Bryan, the collection spans more than 12,000 years, with pieces ranging from ancient Native American cultural artifacts to modern twenty-first century objects.

With approximately 70,000 items in total, the collection includes 20,000 rare books; more than 30,000 documents in Spanish, German, French, and English; three dozen saddles; over 250 antique firearms; several hundred spurs; a large collection of fine art, religious art, folk art, and portraits; exceedingly rare maps and artifacts, such as "cowboy" chaps; Native American stone tools and arrowheads; and a Spanish mission bell.

The Bryan Museum presents a chronological history of Texas and the American West with a special emphasis on the Spanish influences in the region. In addition to its permanent galleries, the Museum also includes space for rotating special exhibits, a library, and an archive.

== History ==
=== Humble Beginnings ===
The Bryan Collection, now housed in The Bryan Museum, arose from humble beginnings. At around age ten, J.P. Bryan acquired his first two pieces, a Moore's Patent Front Loading Revolver and a Sharps Patent Four-Barrel Derringer, to help in his imagined shootouts against the forces of evil. Both firearms still reside in the collection today.

Bryan's interest in Texas history was always strong, given his family's connection to the Texas Revolution—Emily Austin Bryan Perry, Stephen F. Austin's sister, is Bryan's great-great-grandmother, and through her marriages, he is related to the Perry and Bryan families of Texas.

While attending the University of Texas, Bryan started a rare book and printing business with a friend, John H. Jenkins. It was during this period that Bryan began to focus his collecting energies on Texana, although the exact nature of his collection remained undecided.

=== The Early Years ===
Bryan's father, James Perry Bryan Sr., was also a prolific collector who had amassed a large collection of Texas maps, family documents, and artifacts. When Bryan's father sold his collection to the University of Texas in 1966, Bryan's own collecting pursuits began in earnest.

He started with rare books, a business with which he had previous experience and a keen interest. Bryan's uncle, Judge Lewis Wilson of Brazoria County, willed his impressive collection of Texas literature to him, providing Bryan with a strong foundation for his growing library.

=== A Growing Collection ===
From there, the collection expanded both rapidly and eclectically. Fine art acquisitions further shaped its direction, with Western and Texas art becoming an early focus. For many years, Texas art was underappreciated, by critics and collectors alike. More recently, however, Texas artists have enjoyed a renaissance, with a growing popular interest in their works. With its focus on artists who lived during the West's "Golden Age," the Texas art collection presents a unique opportunity for visitors to experience that period of history from each artist's point of view.

Antique firearms were of personal interest to Bryan, and his knowledge of their history helped him amass a high-quality collection. In his pursuit of the finest pieces, Bryan also purchased several existing collections. The Enrique Guerra collection enriched Bryan’s collection with its exquisite Spanish Colonial and Mexican saddles, firearms, and gun leather. The Joe Russell spur collection brought nearly 500 pairs of spurs ranging across five centuries and numerous styles. The Galveston Collection, which Bryan purchased in the 1990s, added over 3,500 documents related to Galveston's unique history.

Bryan also purchased important ephemera collections, including those of Frank Reaugh, a pastel landscape artist who lived near Dallas at the turn of the century, and José Cisneros, a Mexican-born illustrator with a passion for the Spanish southwest. These ephemera collections include artwork, artifacts, manuscripts, sketchbooks and reference works, and original photographs.

=== The Torch Years ===
In 1981, Bryan started an energy company, Torch Energy Advisors, Inc., and moved his collection into the company's offices.

Over the next thirty-two years, the collection continued to expand until it covered more than 25,000 square feet of office space. It was commonly referred to as "The Torch Collection" or, as Bryan himself preferred, "The Visions of the West Collection." Bryan has collected more pointedly in recent years, filling in the few remaining gaps in his remarkable collection.

=== A New Home ===
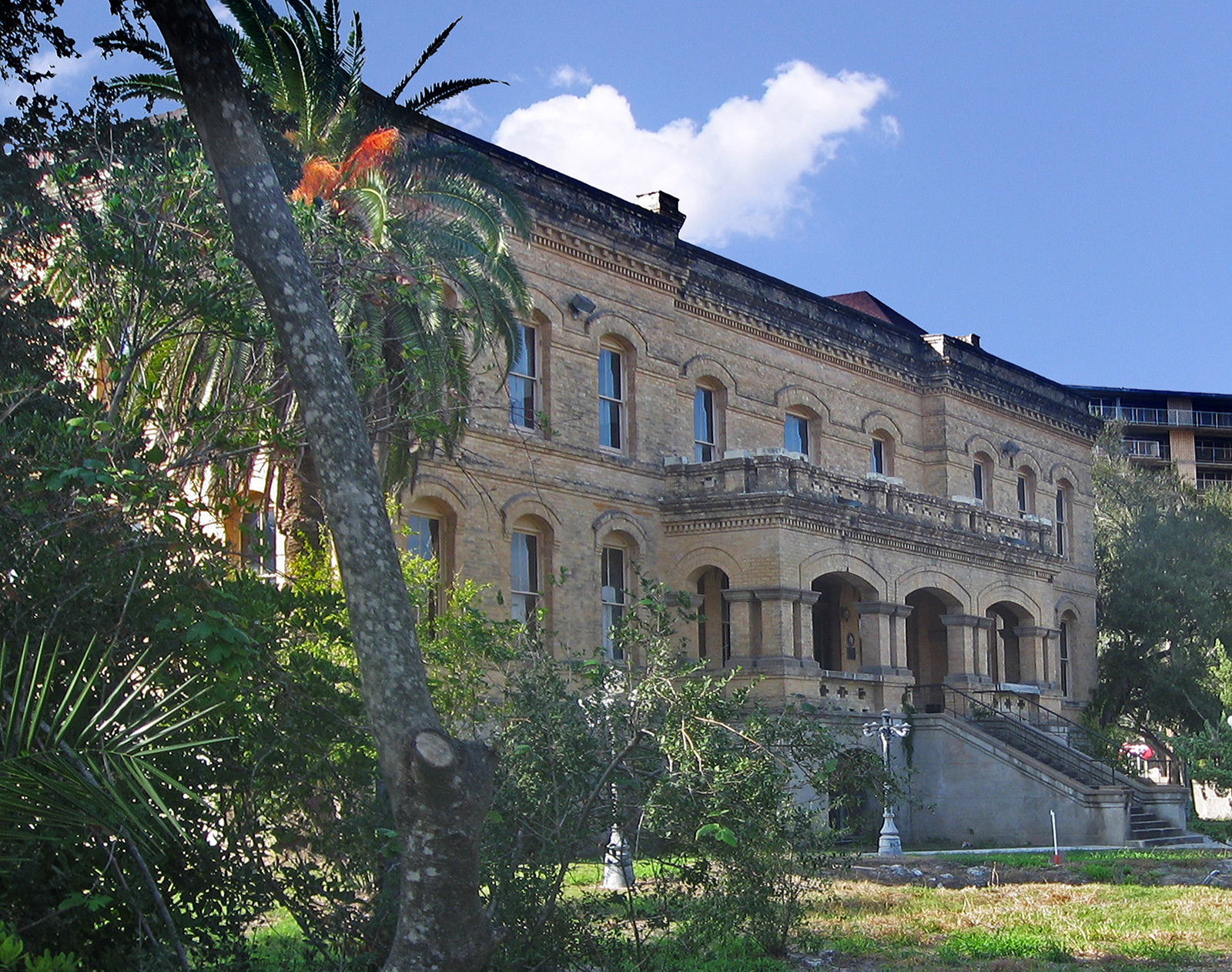
Children's-Home-George-Dealey

In October 2013, Bryan purchased the old Galveston Orphans Home at 1315 21st Street in Galveston, Texas. After a careful restoration of the historic structure, The Bryan Museum opened in June 2015. With 20,000 square feet of exhibit space and lush, manicured grounds, it has become an island destination.

The Bryan Museum presents a chronological history of Texas and the American West with a special emphasis on the Spanish influences in the region. In addition to its permanent galleries, the Museum also includes space for rotating special exhibits, a library, and an archive. Bryan hopes that his collection will aid in the education of both the local community and the five million visitors the island welcomes each year. As the name "Visions of the West" implies, there was a great diversity of experience in the American West, and the mission of The Bryan Museum is to illuminate those compelling histories.

== Radio Transmitter ==
Since 2023, the Houston-based radio station KPFT has operated a simulcast station on 89.5MHz from an antenna on the roof of the museum.
