= Montliot-et-Courcelles =

- Commune
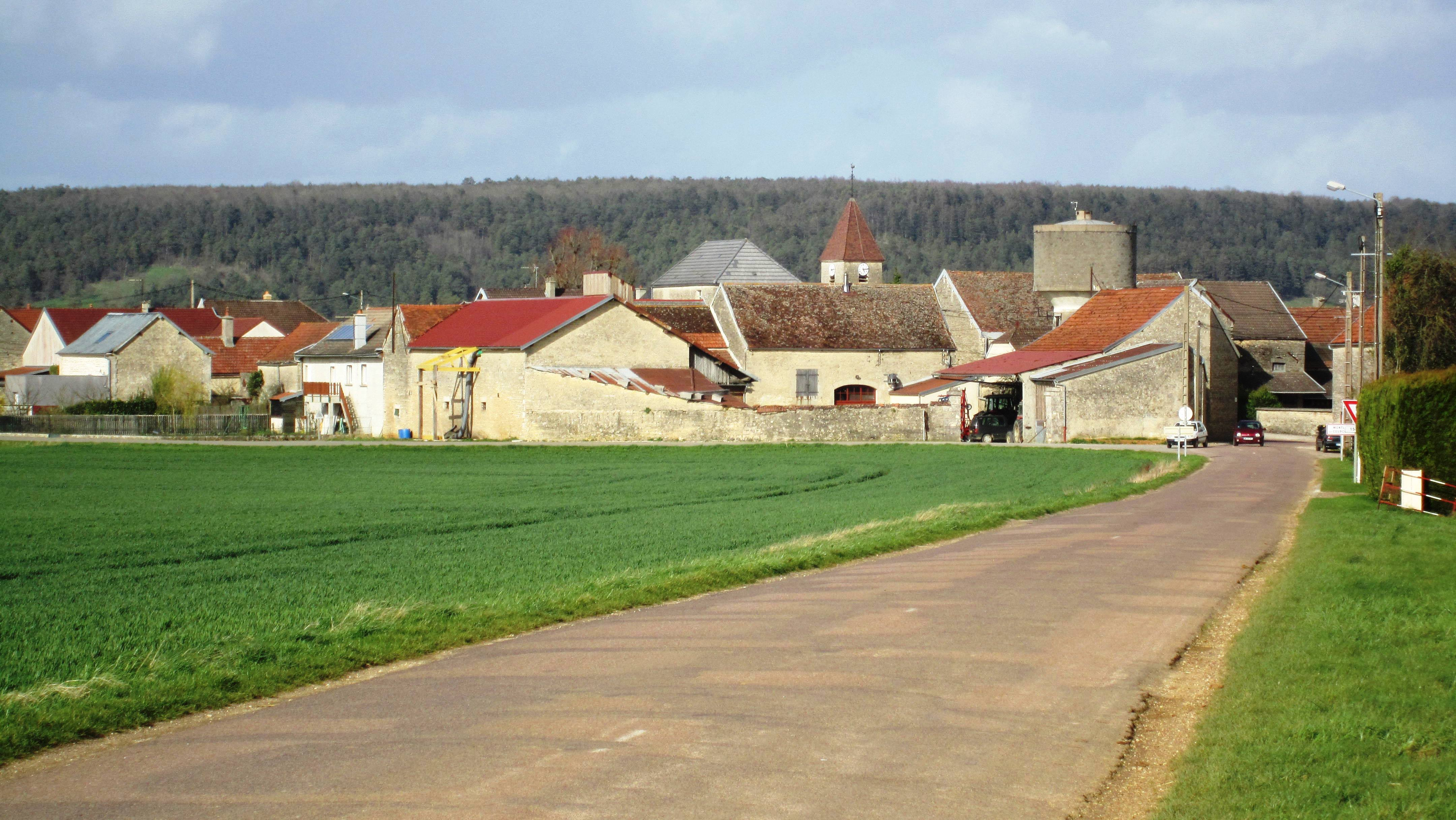
- The road into Montliot from the west

- Coat of arms
- Location of Montliot-et-Courcelles
- Location within France Location within Bourgogne-Franche-Comté
- Coordinates: 47°53′32″N 4°33′37″E
- Country: France
- Region: Bourgogne-Franche-Comté
- Department: Côte-d'Or
- Arrondissement: Montbard
- Canton: Châtillon-sur-Seine
- Intercommunality: Pays Châtillonnais

Government
  - Mayor (2024–2026): Jean-François Bouchard
- Area^{1}: 8.65 km^{2} (3.34 sq mi)
- Elevation: 212 m (696 ft)
- Highest elevation: 318 m (1,043 ft)
- Lowest elevation: 200 m (660 ft)
- Population (2023): 293
  - Density: 33.9/km^{2} (87.7/sq mi)
- Time zone: UTC+01:00 (CET)
  - Summer (DST): UTC+02:00 (CEST)
- INSEE/Postal code: 21435 /21400
- ^{1} French Land Register data, which excludes lakes, ponds, glaciers > 1 km^{2} (0.386 sq mi or 247 acres) and river estuaries.

Montliot-et-Courcelles (French pronunciation: [mɔ̃ljo e kuʁsɛl]) is a commune in the Côte-d'Or department in eastern France.

== Population ==
Historical population
Year	Pop.	±% p.a.
1968	253	—
1975	281	+1.51%
1982	234	−2.58%
1990	288	+2.63%
1999	278	−0.39%
2007	291	+0.57%
2012	288	−0.21%
2017	303	+1.02%
2023	293	−0.56%
Source: INSEE

== See also ==
- Communes of the Côte-d'Or department
