= Brione, Lombardy =

Brione Breó
- Comune
- Comune di Brione
- Location within Italy Location within Lombardy
- Coordinates: 45°38′N 10°8′E
- Country: Italy
- Region: Lombardy
- Province: Province of Brescia (BS)
- Frazioni: San Zenone, Aquilini, Barche, Vesalla

Government
  - Mayor: Almiro Gino Svanera

Area
  - Total: 6.89 km^{2} (2.66 sq mi)
- Elevation: 893 m (2,930 ft)

Population (2011)
  - Total: 721
  - Density: 105/km^{2} (271/sq mi)
- Time zone: UTC+1 (CET)
  - Summer (DST): UTC+2 (CEST)
- Postal code: 25060
- Dialing code: 030

Brione (Brescian: Breó) is a comune in the province of Brescia, in Lombardy.
