= Celles-sur-Ource =

Commune in Grand Est, France

- Commune
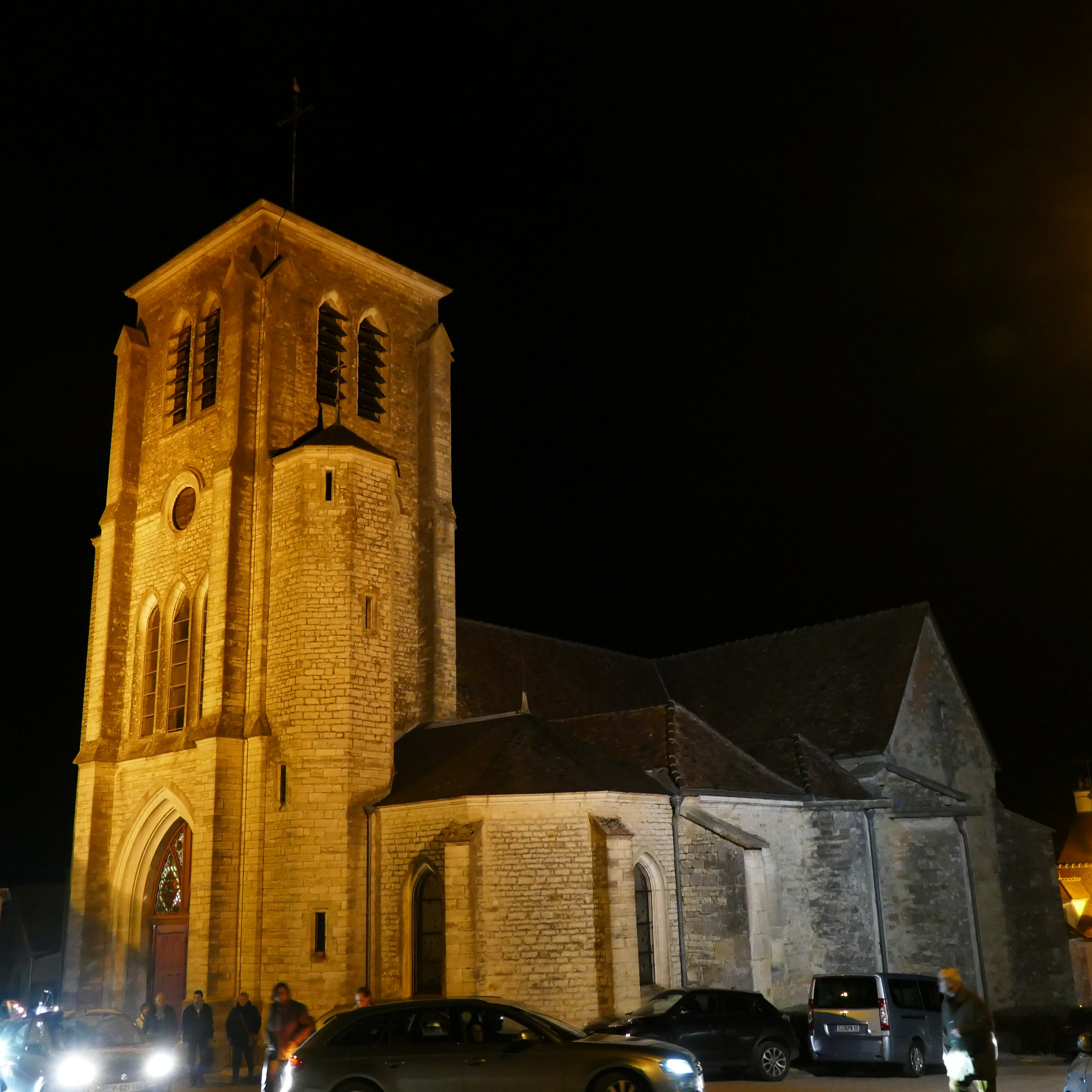
- The church in Celles-sur-Ource

- Coat of arms
- Location of Celles-sur-Ource
- Location within France Location within Grand Est
- Coordinates: 48°04′41″N 4°24′01″E
- Country: France
- Region: Grand Est
- Department: Aube
- Arrondissement: Troyes
- Canton: Bar-sur-Seine

Government
  - Mayor (2020–2026): Vincent Delot
- Area^{1}: 9.59 km^{2} (3.70 sq mi)
- Elevation: 172 m (564 ft)
- Population (2023): 490
  - Density: 51/km^{2} (130/sq mi)
- Time zone: UTC+01:00 (CET)
  - Summer (DST): UTC+02:00 (CEST)
- INSEE/Postal code: 10070 /10110
- ^{1} French Land Register data, which excludes lakes, ponds, glaciers > 1 km^{2} (0.386 sq mi or 247 acres) and river estuaries.

Celles-sur-Ource (French pronunciation: [sɛl syʁ uʁs], literally Celles on Ource) is a commune in the Aube department in north-central France.

== Geography ==
The village lies in the northwestern part of the commune, on the left bank of the Ource, which flows northwest through the middle of the commune.

== Population ==
Historical population
Year	Pop.	±% p.a.
1968	525	—
1975	531	+0.16%
1982	505	−0.71%
1990	485	−0.50%
1999	455	−0.71%
2007	445	−0.28%
2012	492	+2.03%
2017	505	+0.52%
2023	490	−0.50%
Source: INSEE

== See also ==
- Communes of the Aube department
