= Bryan, Arkansas =

Unincorporated community in Arkansas, U.S.

Coordinates: 34°56′07″N 94°13′31″W

Bryan is an unincorporated community in Scott County, in the U.S. state of Arkansas.

== History ==
Bryan, also called "Bryan's Spur", developed along the Arkansas Western Railroad which was built through the area in the early 1900s. A post office called "Bryan Spur" was established in 1915, but closed within that same year.
