= Bryan Township =

Bryan Township may refer to:

- Bryan Township, Boone County, Arkansas
- Bryan Township, Thurston County, Nebraska
- Bryan Township, Surry County, North Carolina
