= Lake Bryan =

- Location within Texas Location within the United States
- Location: Brazos County, Texas
- Coordinates: 30°42.76′N 96°27.95′W
- Type: Power plant cooling reservoir
- Basin countries: United States
- Surface area: 829 acres (335 ha)
- Max. depth: 45 ft (14 m)
- Surface elevation: 356 ft (109 m)

Lake Bryan is a power plant cooling pond in Brazos County, 5 miles (8 km) northwest of Bryan, Texas, United States. The dam and lake are managed by Bryan Texas Utilities which uses the reservoir as a cooling pond for the electrical generators in the Dansby Power Plant. The reservoir was officially impounded in 1974. Lake Bryan is a popular recreational destination. The census-designated place of Lake Bryan consists of residential neighborhoods around the lake.

Lake Bryan is designated on some maps as Bryan Utilities Lake.

== Fish populations ==
Lake Bryan has been stocked with species of fish intended to improve the utility of the reservoir for recreational fishing. Fish present in Lake Bryan include largemouth bass, catfish, crappie, tilapia, carp, red drum, thread fin shad, walleye and sunfish.

== Recreational uses ==
Boating and fishing are very popular. Lake Bryan is also home to the Texas A&M University Rowing, Wakeboarding, Sailing, and Cycling teams, as well as the Sailing Club. The rowing team and the sailing team compete regionally and nationally in their respective organizations. The bike trails surrounding the lake are maintained by the Brazos Valley Mountain Bike Association. Campsites are also available for rent.

== See also ==
- Lake Bryan, Texas, the surrounding census-designated place
