= Ource =

River in France

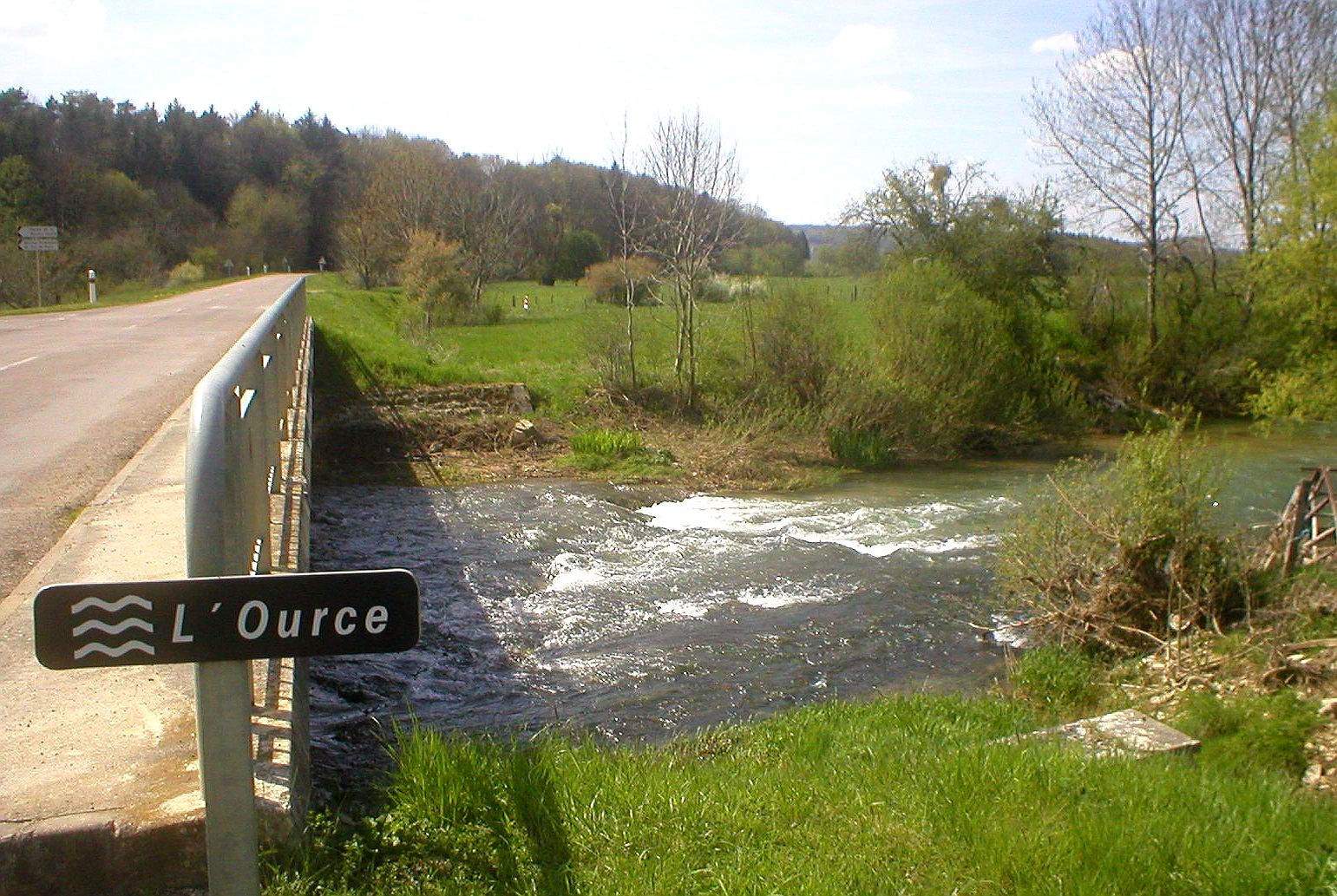
- The Ource at Autricourt.

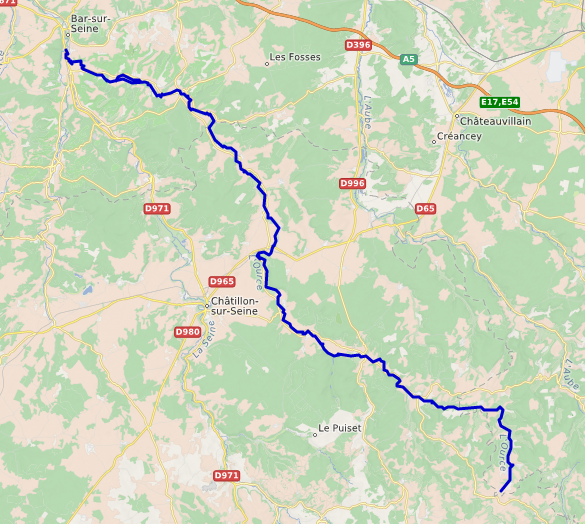

Location
- Country: France

Physical characteristics
- Source
  - location: Near Poinson-lès-Grancey
  - coordinates: 47°41′24″N 04°58′41″E
  - elevation: 400 m (1,300 ft)
- Mouth
  - location: Seine
  - coordinates: 48°05′46″N 04°22′51″E
  - elevation: 156 m (512 ft)
- Length: 100 km (62 mi)
- Basin size: 736 km^{2} (284 sq mi)
- Discharge
  - average: 8.6 m^{3}/s (300 cu ft/s)

Basin features
- Progression: Seine→ English Channel

The Ource (French: [uʁs]) is a 100 km (62 mi) long river in northeastern France, a right tributary of the river Seine. Its source is in the Haute-Marne department, 2 km south of Poinson-lès-Grancey. It flows generally northwest. It joins the Seine at Bar-sur-Seine.

Its course crosses the following departments and communes:

- Haute-Marne: Poinson-lès-Grancey
- Côte-d'Or: Recey-sur-Ource, Brion-sur-Ource, Autricourt, Grancey-sur-Ource
- Aube: Essoyes, Celles-sur-Ource, Bar-sur-Seine
