= Bryant High School =

Bryant High School may refer to:

- William Cullen Bryant High School (New York City)
- Bryant High School (Arkansas)
