= Brion-sur-Ource =

- Commune
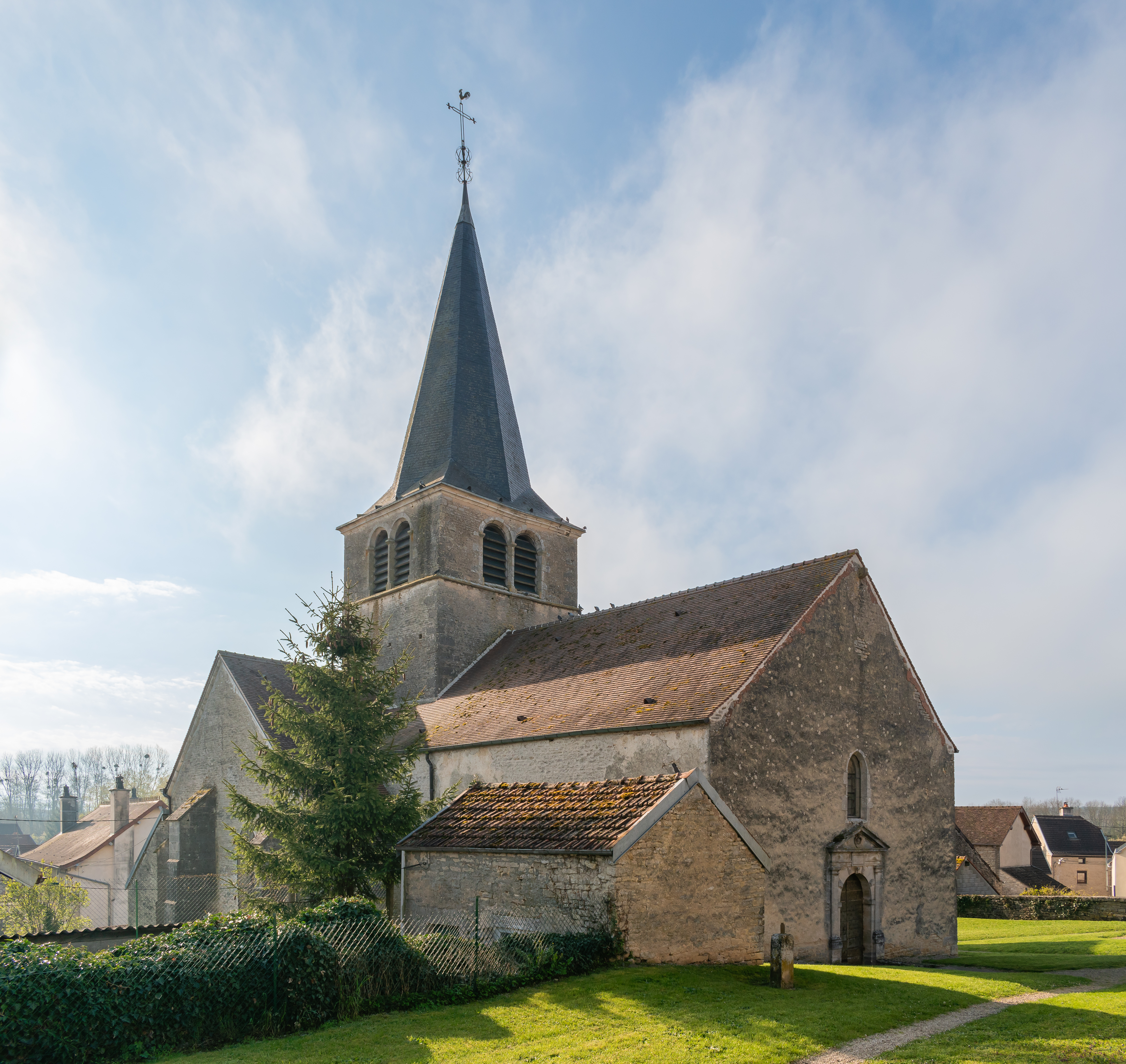
- The church in Brion-sur-Ource

- Coat of arms
- Location of Brion-sur-Ource
- Location within France Location within Bourgogne-Franche-Comté
- Coordinates: 47°55′01″N 4°39′49″E
- Country: France
- Region: Bourgogne-Franche-Comté
- Department: Côte-d'Or
- Arrondissement: Montbard
- Canton: Châtillon-sur-Seine
- Intercommunality: Pays Châtillonnais

Government
  - Mayor (2020–2026): Georges Morin
- Area^{1}: 14.01 km^{2} (5.41 sq mi)
- Elevation: 236 m (774 ft)
- Highest elevation: 333 m (1,093 ft)
- Lowest elevation: 217 m (712 ft)
- Population (2023): 215
  - Density: 15.3/km^{2} (39.7/sq mi)
- Time zone: UTC+01:00 (CET)
  - Summer (DST): UTC+02:00 (CEST)
- INSEE/Postal code: 21109 /21570
- ^{1} French Land Register data, which excludes lakes, ponds, glaciers > 1 km^{2} (0.386 sq mi or 247 acres) and river estuaries.

Brion-sur-Ource (French pronunciation: [bʁijɔ̃ syʁ uʁs], literally Brion on Ource) is a commune in the Côte-d'Or department in eastern France.

== Geography ==
The Ource forms part of the commune's western border, then flows north-northeast through the northern part of the commune, where it crosses the village.

== Population ==
Historical population
Year	Pop.	±% p.a.
1968	247	—
1975	223	−1.45%
1982	225	+0.13%
1990	245	+1.07%
1999	223	−1.04%
2007	224	+0.06%
2012	222	−0.18%
2017	238	+1.40%
2023	215	−1.68%
Source: INSEE

== See also ==
- Communes of the Côte-d'Or department
