= Grancey-sur-Ource =

- Commune
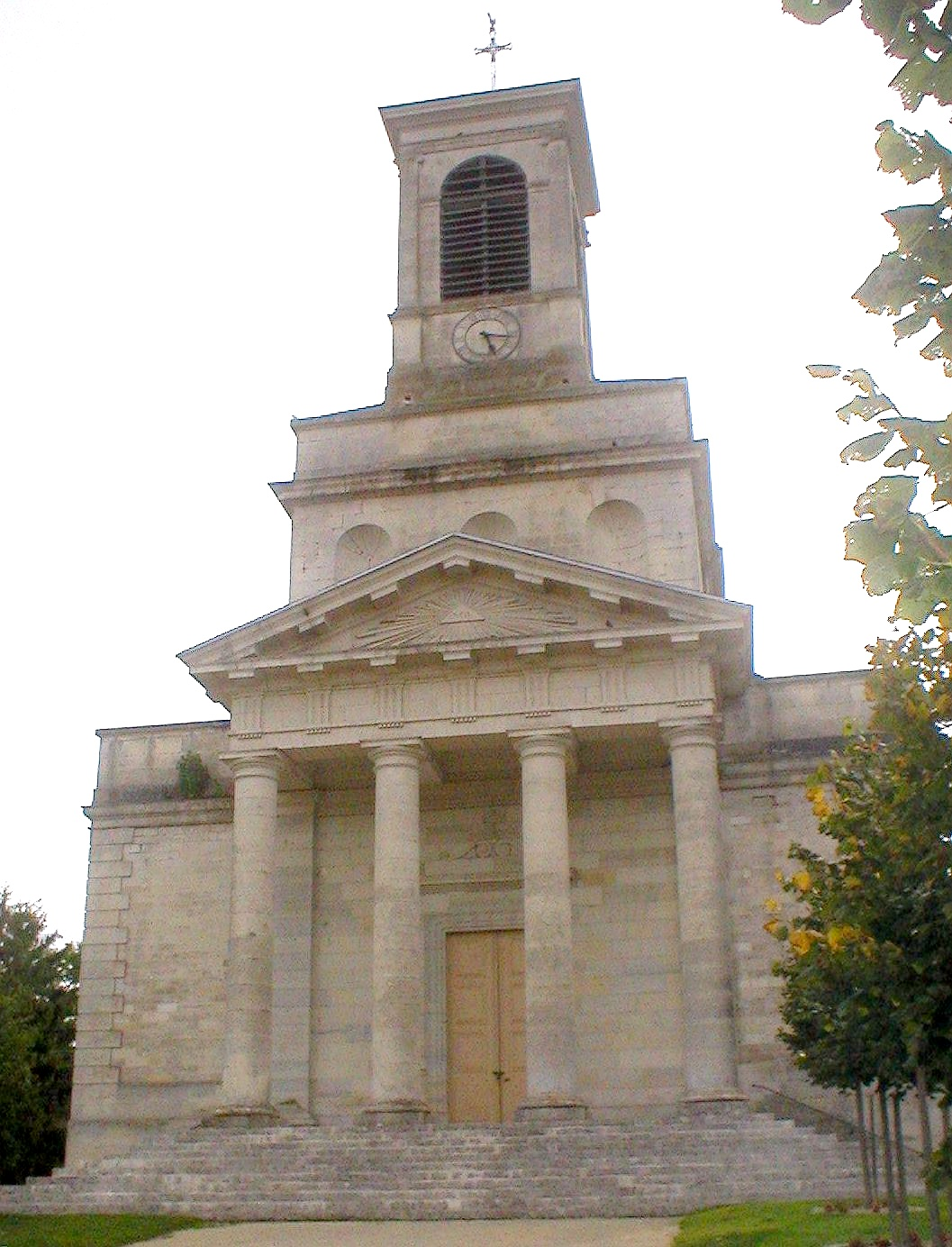
- The church in Grancey-sur-Ource

- Coat of arms
- Location of Grancey-sur-Ource
- Location within France Location within Bourgogne-Franche-Comté
- Coordinates: 48°00′31″N 4°35′19″E
- Country: France
- Region: Bourgogne-Franche-Comté
- Department: Côte-d'Or
- Arrondissement: Montbard
- Canton: Châtillon-sur-Seine
- Intercommunality: Pays Châtillonnais

Government
  - Mayor (2020–2026): Roland Van Hecke
- Area^{1}: 23.94 km^{2} (9.24 sq mi)
- Elevation: 206 m (676 ft)
- Highest elevation: 347 m (1,138 ft)
- Lowest elevation: 190 m (620 ft)
- Population (2023): 172
  - Density: 7.18/km^{2} (18.6/sq mi)
- Time zone: UTC+01:00 (CET)
  - Summer (DST): UTC+02:00 (CEST)
- INSEE/Postal code: 21305 /21570
- ^{1} French Land Register data, which excludes lakes, ponds, glaciers > 1 km^{2} (0.386 sq mi or 247 acres) and river estuaries.

Grancey-sur-Ource (French pronunciation: [ɡʁɑ̃sɛ syʁ uʁs], literally Grancey on Ource) is a commune in the Côte-d'Or department in eastern France.

== Geography ==
The village lies on the left bank of the Ource, which flows northwest through the northeastern part of the commune.

== Population ==
Historical population
Year	Pop.	±% p.a.
1968	316	—
1975	282	−1.61%
1982	253	−1.54%
1990	237	−0.81%
1999	213	−1.18%
2007	202	−0.66%
2012	218	+1.54%
2017	200	−1.71%
2023	172	−2.48%
Source: INSEE

== See also ==
- Communes of the Côte-d'Or department
