= Grancey-le-Château-Neuvelle =

- Commune
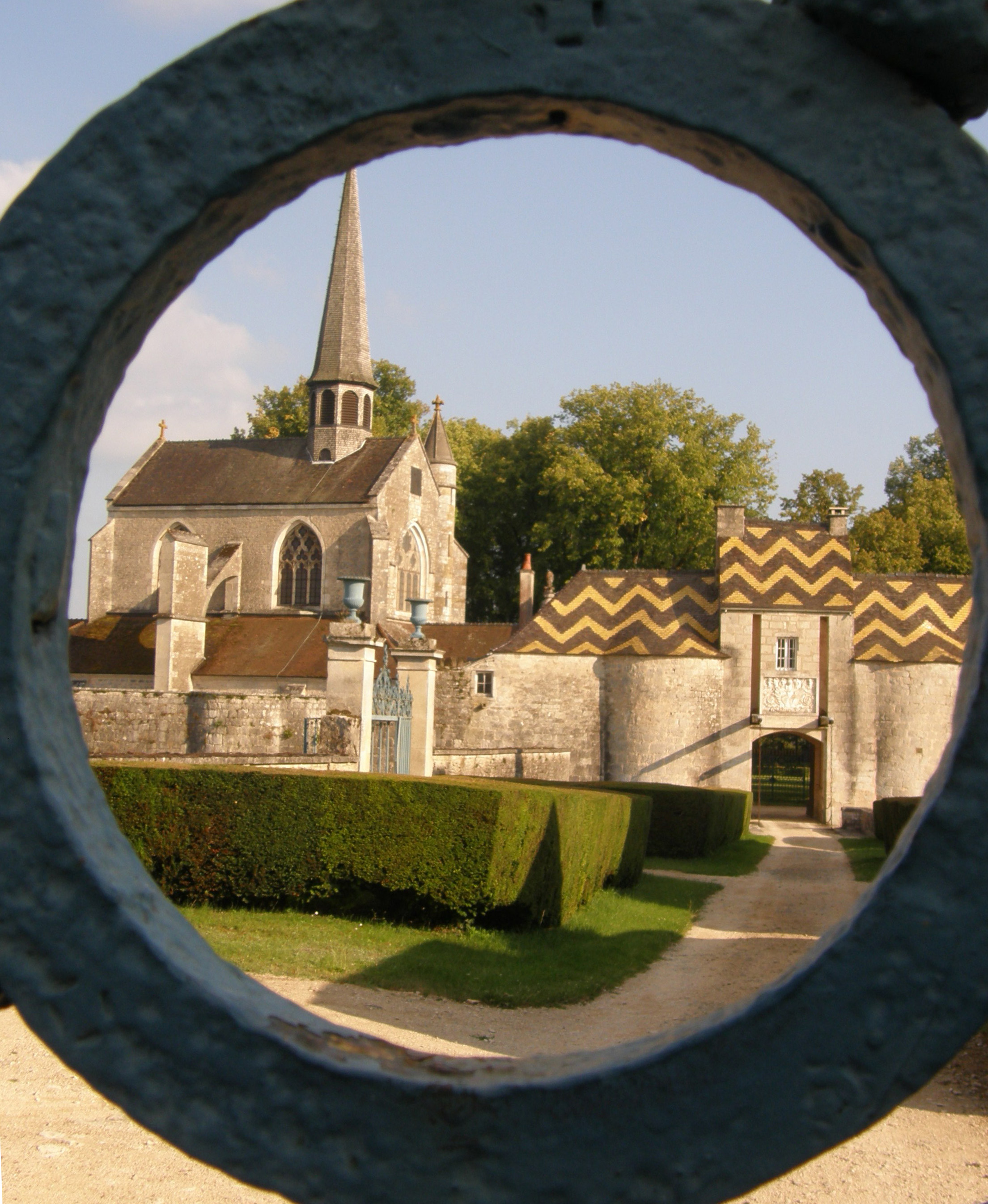
- Chateau

- Coat of arms
- Location of Grancey-le-Château-Neuvelle
- Location within France Location within Bourgogne-Franche-Comté
- Coordinates: 47°40′15″N 5°01′36″E
- Country: France
- Region: Bourgogne-Franche-Comté
- Department: Côte-d'Or
- Arrondissement: Dijon
- Canton: Is-sur-Tille

Government
  - Mayor (2020–2026): Cécile Ponsot
- Area^{1}: 27.55 km^{2} (10.64 sq mi)
- Elevation: 430 m (1,410 ft)
- Highest elevation: 493 m (1,617 ft)
- Lowest elevation: 309 m (1,014 ft)
- Population (2023): 247
  - Density: 8.97/km^{2} (23.2/sq mi)
- Time zone: UTC+01:00 (CET)
  - Summer (DST): UTC+02:00 (CEST)
- INSEE/Postal code: 21304 /21580
- ^{1} French Land Register data, which excludes lakes, ponds, glaciers > 1 km^{2} (0.386 sq mi or 247 acres) and river estuaries.

Grancey-le-Château-Neuvelle (French pronunciation: [ɡʁɑ̃sɛ l(ə) ʃɑto nøvɛl]) is a commune in the Côte-d'Or department in eastern France.

The castle was built between 1705 and 1725 by Jacques Eléonor Rouxel de Grancey on the location of a medieval fortress, erected in 1098 by Ponce de Grancey.

== Population ==
Historical population
Year	Pop.	±% p.a.
1968	310	—
1975	317	+0.32%
1982	269	−2.32%
1990	278	+0.41%
1999	292	+0.55%
2007	266	−1.16%
2012	269	+0.22%
2017	252	−1.30%
2023	247	−0.33%
Source: INSEE

== See also ==
- Communes of the Côte-d'Or department
