= Brian (disambiguation) =

Brian is a masculine given name and surname.

Brian may also refer to:

== Mononymous uses ==
- Brian (mythology), a figure in Celtic mythology
- Brian (Korean American singer), Brian Joo (born 1981)
  - The Brian, a 2006 album by Brian Joo
- Brian (dog), original name of Bing, a dog who served in the British Army in World War II

== Other uses ==
- Brian, Missouri, a community in the United States
- Brian (software), a software package for neural network simulations

== See also ==
- Brian and Michael, British musical duo
- Bryan (disambiguation)
