= Bryan Township, Boone County, Arkansas =

Bryan Township
- Township
- Location in Arkansas
- Coordinates: 36°12′20.92″N 93°12′16.75″W
- Country: United States
- State: Arkansas
- County: Boone

Area
  - Total: 17.668 sq mi (45.76 km^{2})
  - Land: 17.621 sq mi (45.64 km^{2})
  - Water: 0.018 sq mi (0.047 km^{2})

Population (2010)
  - Total: 1,018
  - Density: 57.03/sq mi (22.02/km^{2})
- Time zone: UTC-6 (CST)
  - Summer (DST): UTC-5 (CDT)
- Zip Code: 72601 (Harrison)
- Area code: 870

Bryan Township is one of twenty current townships in Boone County, Arkansas, USA. As of the 2010 census, its total population was 1,018.

== Geography ==
According to the United States Census Bureau, Bryan Township covers an area of 17.668 square miles (45.76 km^{2}); 17.621 square miles (45.64 km^{2}) of land and 0.018 square miles (0.047 km^{2}) of water.

=== Cities, towns, and villages ===
- Harrison (small part)

== Population history ==
Historical population
Census	Pop.	Note	%±
1900	416		—
1910	403		−3.1%
1920	334		−17.1%
1930	268		−19.8%
1940	357		33.2%
1950	583		63.3%
1960	305		−47.7%
1970	573		87.9%
1980	903		57.6%
1990	780		−13.6%
2000	1,006		29.0%
2010	1,018		1.2%
