= Texas State Highway Loop 121 =

Beltway in Texas

State Highway Loop 121

Route information
- Maintained by TxDOT
- Length: 5.961 mi (9.593 km)
- Existed: October 31, 1958–present

Major junctions
- West end: FM 439 in Belton
- I-14 / US 190 in Belton; I-35 in Belton
- East end: FM 436 in Belton

Location
- Country: United States
- State: Texas

Highway system
- Highways in Texas; Interstate; US; State; Former; Toll; Loops; Spurs; FM/RM; Park; Rec
| ← Loop 120 | → Loop 122 |

Loop 121 is a partial beltway around the city of Belton in the U.S. state of Texas.

== Route description ==
Loop 121 begins at an intersection with FM 439 near Belton Lake. The highway travels through more rural areas of the city, running near the western edge of Belton and passes just east of the campus of University of Mary Hardin Baylor. Loop 121 travels through more commercial areas between I-14/US 190 and I-35 as the highway passes near the Bell County Expo Center. East of I-35, the highway travels through a more suburban area of Belton before ending at an intersection with FM 436.

== History ==
Loop 121 was first designated as Spur 121 on May 29, 1941 as a highway in Brewster County, connecting SH 227 (now FM 170) to the town of Terlingua. This highway was cancelled on February 20, 1946, being removed from the state highway system.

Loop 121 was designated on October 31, 1958, running from I-35 eastward to FM 436. On October 11, 1978, the highway was extended west of I-35 to US 190, absorbing FM 594. Loop 121 was extended northward from US 190 to FM 439 on July 10, 1988, absorbing FM 3467 in the process.

== Junction list ==
The entire route is in Belton, Bell County.

| mi | km | Destinations | Notes |
|---|---|---|---|
| 0.0 | 0.0 | FM 439 (Lake Road) – Belton Lake | |
| 0.7 | 1.1 | Crusader Way – University of Mary Hardin Baylor | Interchange |
| 1.8 | 2.9 | FM 93 (2nd Avenue) | |
| 2.8 | 4.5 | I-14 / US 190 (Central Texas Expressway) – Killeen | I-14/US 190 exit 300 |
| 4.9 | 7.9 | I-35 (General Bruce Drive) – Waco, Austin | I-35 exit 292 |
| 6.0 | 9.7 | FM 436 (Holland Road) – Little River Academy | |
1.000 mi = 1.609 km; 1.000 km = 0.621 mi
