= U.S. Route 190 =

Highway in the United States

U.S. Route 190
- US 190 highlighted in red

Route information
- Auxiliary route of US 90
- Length: 875 mi (1,408 km)
- Existed: 1926–present

Major junctions
- West end: I-10 near Iraan, TX
- I-14 / I-35 at Belton, TX; I-35 at Temple, TX; I-45 at Huntsville, TX; Future I-69 / US 59 at Livingston; I-49 / US 167 at Opelousas, LA; US 71 at Krotz Springs, LA; I-110 at Baton Rouge, LA; I-55 at Hammond, LA; I-12 at Covington, LA; I-10 at Slidell, LA
- East end: US 90 at White Kitchen, LA

Location
- Country: United States
- States: Texas, Louisiana

Highway system
- United States Numbered Highway System; List; Special; Divided

U.S. Route 190 (US 190) is an east–west United States Highway in Louisiana and Texas. Segments of US 190 will be upgraded to Interstate 14 (I-14); the first 24.8-mile (39.9 km) segment was opened on January 26, 2017.

== Route description ==
Lengths
	mi	km
TX	586	943
LA	282	454
Total	875	1,408

=== Texas ===
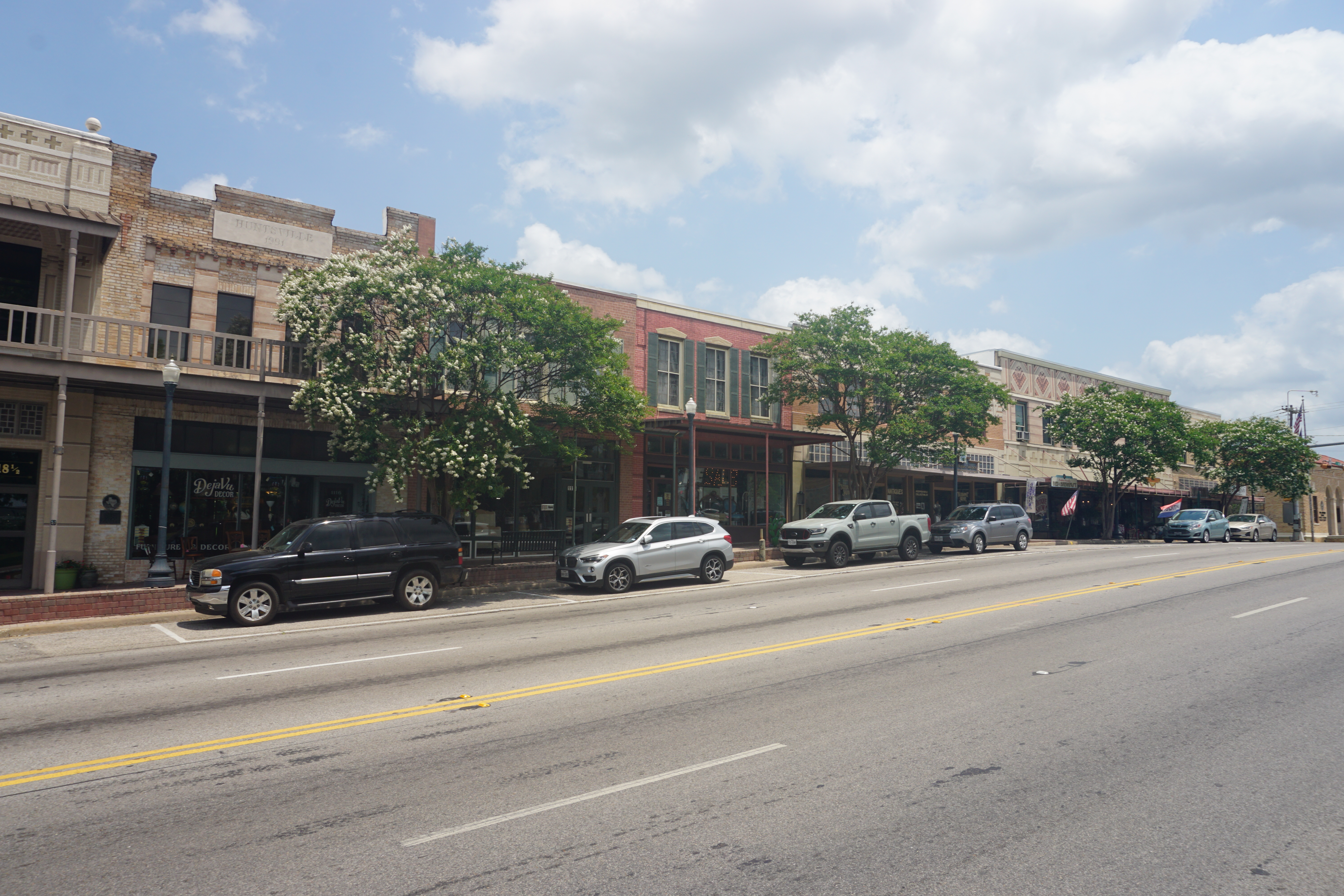
U.S. Route 190 in Huntsville

The western terminus is at a point where US 190 intersects with I-10, a few miles east of Bakersfield and 20 mi (32 km) west of the town of Iraan, in the middle of Pecos County.

It runs east through Texas Hill Country speckled with sagebrush, intersecting with State Highway 305 (SH 305), crossing into Schleicher County, and intersecting with US 277 in Eldorado. US 190 continues east into Menard County, intersecting State Highway 864, and passing a few miles north of Fort McKavett State Historic Site, entering Menard and intersecting with US 83 north a short distance.

Continuing on a northeastward route, US 190 enters McCulloch County and into Brady. As the closest city to the geographical center of Texas, the city proclaims itself the "True Heart of Texas", "where five major highways meet, making it a major gateway to all regions of the state". US 190 enters Brady from the south merging and running concurrently with north US 377 and US 87 through town, intersecting Farm to Market Road 2028 (FM 2028), FM 2309, then splitting with US 87 and US 377, before exiting the city heading east. US 190 goes through Rochelle, enters San Saba County, through Richland Springs where it intersects FM 45, the communities Algerita, and Harkeyville, and into San Saba, the birthplace of actor Tommy Lee Jones, and an intersection with SH 16. Continuing east, US 190 enters Lampasas County, entering Lometa, merging and running concurrently with US 183 south into the city of Lampasas. Splitting from US 183 and continuing east, US 190 runs through Kempner and into the extreme southern corner of Coryell County and Copperas Cove, which is located on the southwestern edge of Fort Hood. On the east side of Copperas Cove, a concurrency with I-14 begins. US 190 then traverses through part of Fort Hood, into Bell County and Killeen. Being directly adjacent to the main cantonment of Fort Hood, both Killeen and Copperas Cove depend on the fort and those stationed there.

US 190 next intersects and merges with I-35 through Belton and enters Temple, where I-14 ends. The highway then merges and runs concurrently with SH 36 south. Continuing east and south, US 190 passes through Rogers and enters Milam County then Cameron and merges with US 77 south for a distance. A few miles south of Cameron, US 190 merges and runs concurrently with US 79 north. In Hearne, US 190 splits with US 79 and merges to run concurrently with SH 6 south, entering Brazos County, through Benchley, and into Bryan, that is considered the heart of the Brazos Valley (Southeast Central Texas), and is part of the Bryan-College Station metropolitan area.

US 190 splits with SH 6, turning northeast and merging with SH 21 north, entering Kurten, entering Madison County also passing through North Zulch, Cottonwood and into Madisonville, before merging with I-45 south and into Walker County, then entering Huntsville, where US 190 splits heading into Eastern Texas.

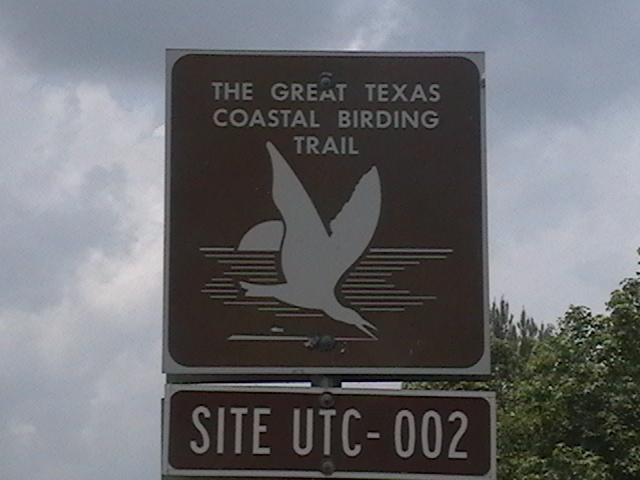

Continuing east, US 190 enters San Jacinto County, passing north of Oakhurst and Point Blank, crossing Lake Livingston, entering Polk County and into Onalaska. US 190 from the west makes a semi-loop up over Lake Livingston and down to Livingston, intersecting US 59 and Business US 59 (Bus. US 59) and through Alabama-Coushatta Indian Reservation, entering Tyler County, merging with FM 256 and into Woodville. East of Woodville, FM 256 splits north and US 190 crosses BA Steinhagen Lake, into Jasper County, intersecting with SH 63 east, and in the center of Jasper intersecting with US 96. Continuing east, US 190 travels through Holly Springs and enters Newton County, proceeding into Newton. In Newton, US 190 turns south through Bon Wier, and then crosses the Louisiana line. In Newton County, US 190 has been designated one of the routes on the Great Texas Coastal Birding Trail.

=== Louisiana ===
US 190 crosses the Sabine River and enters the western portion of Louisiana in swampy bayou terrain three miles (4.8 km) west of Merryville, Louisiana. Merryville is the location of the old Coushatta Indian village.

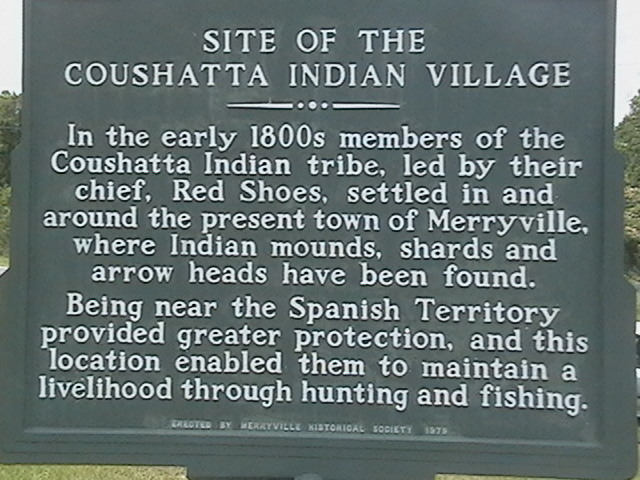

From Merryville the highway heads north by northeast to the community of Junction, Louisiana, also referred to as "The Junction". Junction is where Louisiana Highway 111 (LA 111) and US 190 intersect and is the site of a roadside marker and the joining of two Indian trails.

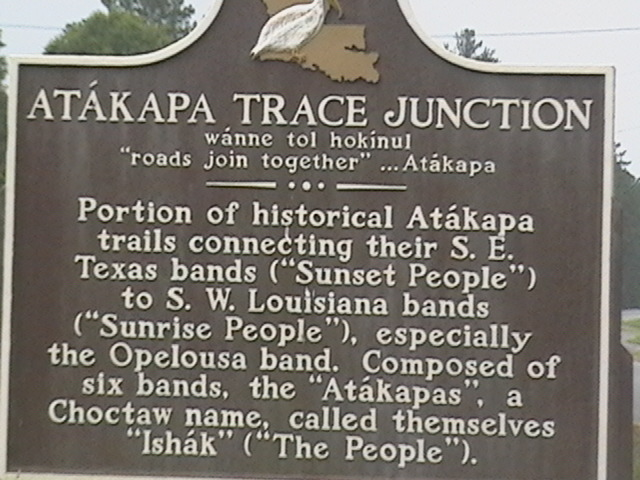

From Junction, US 190 heads east to DeRidder, where it runs concurrently with US 171 south and passes several sites on the National Register of Historic Places, such as the Beauregard Parish Jail, Beauregard Parish Courthouse, and the DeRidder Commercial Historic District. US 190 runs concurrently with US 171 to Ragley, where US 190 parts with US 171 heading east. From Ragley, the two-lane highway heads nearly due east almost parallel to I-10 until Opelousas. US 190 crosses the northern reach of the Atchafalaya Basin near the Morganza Spillway en route to Baton Rouge. From Baton Rouge, US 190 passes, in places divided, through Denham Springs, Albany, Hammond, Robert, Goodbee, Covington, (Note: West of Covington the original US 190 splits from US 190 and is signed as Bus. US 190. Bus. US 190 is joined by LA 21, and Bus. US 190 and LA 21 run concurrently through Covington until Bus. US 190 ends at US 190; LA 21 then turns northeast toward Bogalusa.) Mandeville, before reaching the eastern terminus at Slidell. A New bridge was built and completed in January 2026

The stretch between I-12 south of Covington and the intersection with LA 22 at Mandeville is multilane divided with controlled access, serving as the primary connector between I-12 and the north end of the Lake Pontchartrain Causeway. The highway's eastern terminus is in the bayous near Slidell, at an intersection with US 90. This junction was once known as the "White Kitchen" after a restaurant that was once located there.

=== Other designations ===
- Atchafalaya Expressway — US 190 in Louisiana
- Earl Rudder Freeway and Central Texas Expressway

== History ==
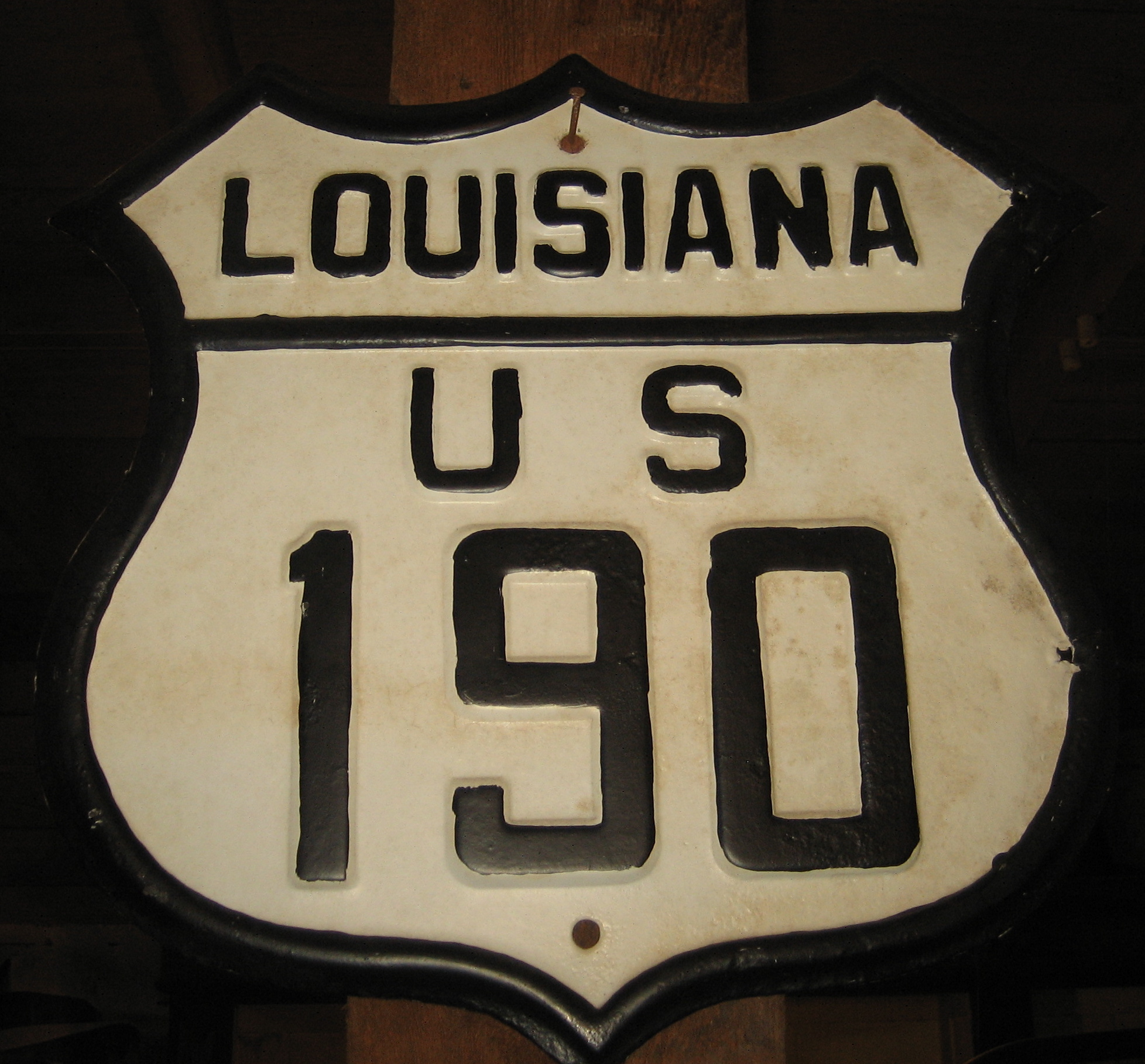
Old US 190 sign

In the original 1926 plan, US 190 served the purpose of modern-day I-12 as the road around the north side of Lake Pontchartrain to avoid New Orleans. The original western terminus was in Baton Rouge, Louisiana, meeting US 71 at the Baton Rouge–Port Allen ferry across the Mississippi River. US 190 was concurrent with State Route 7 (SR 7, in the pre-1955 Louisiana Highway system) from Baton Rouge to Covington, then SR 34 from Covington to Slidell, Louisiana. The original eastern terminus of US 190 was in Slidell, where it intersected US 90/LA 2 (now US 11).

In 1935, the route was extended west across the Mississippi River, ending in the western Texas town of Brady at an intersection with US 87. The section from Krotz Springs to the Baton Rouge-Port Allen ferry was a concurrency with US 71 from 1935 until 1951.

US 190 was assigned to an additional 150 miles (240 km) across the sparsely populated areas of western Texas south of San Angelo in June 1977, taking effect January 1, 1978. US 190 now ran westward to I-10 outside of Iraan, replacing a section of Ranch to Market Road 33 (RM 33) and all of both FM 1257 and FM 1980.

=== Louisiana ===
The original 1926 route followed the Jefferson Highway through downtown Baton Rouge, then LA 426 (Old Hammond Highway) to the Amite River. East of Baton Rouge, significant differences from the current alignment are as follows: LA 1032 through Denham Springs; LA 1027 into Walker; LA 43 and 1040 (Old Baton Rouge Highway) between Albany and Hammond; South Range Road and LA 1067 (Old Covington Highway) between Hammond and the Tangipahoa River; and Bus. US 190 through Covington.

West of Baton Rouge, the current alignment generally follows the same route since its extension into Texas in 1935. The only major re-routing was between Deridder and Elton, where the original route followed LA 26. The portion between Oberlin and Elton was re-routed in 1937 to follow US 165 to Kinder before assuming the current alignment between Deridder and Kinder the following year. Other differences from the current route are as follows: LA 110 through Merryville; LA 3099 into DeRidder; LA 3253, 1244, 31, and 742 between Opelousas and Port Barre; Old U.S. 190 between Bayou Courtableau and Krotz Springs and between East Krotz Springs, Louisiana Krotz Springs and Lottie; LA 77 between Livonia and Rosedale; and LA 76 between Rosedale and Port Allen.

In 1937, US 190 took over the original route of US 90 from Slidell to the Rigolets Bridge (along current US 11 and LA 433) when that highway assumed its current routing into Mississippi. US 190 was given its current eastern terminus at US 90 in the 1940s, following what is now Bus. US 190 (Fremaux Avenue) through Slidell until the 1970s when it was shifted onto Gause Boulevard.

In 1951, US 190 was re-routed along Bus. US 51 (mainline US 51 at the time) and LA 22 between Hammond and Mandeville. The new route passed through Ponchatoula and Madisonville and bypassed Covington. The former route through Covington was restored in 1956.

The current US 190 near Krotz Springs is an elevated highway. The road was built as a bypass around the road called Old 190 which continues across the Morganza Spillway to the western edge of Lottie. US 190 crosses the Atchafalaya River on two cantilever bridges known as the Krotz Springs Bridge. It crosses the Mississippi River on the 1940-era Huey Long Bridge north of Baton Rouge.

The route is now used as an alternate route for I-10, across the Atchafalaya Expressway. Traffic can be diverted along LA 975 to Krotz Springs, and LA 76 to US 190/LA 1.

== Future ==
Interstate 14 is likely to extend further west and east in central Texas along the US 190 corridor, once adequate funding becomes available. In 2019, Representative Brian Babin (R-TX) introduced legislation in the House of Representatives to extend the I-14 corridor through Odessa, many parts of which would likely follow the US 190 alignment through parts of central Texas. Though the bill was referred to the Congressional Subcommittee on Highways and Transit, it is likely that bills featuring a congressional I-14 designation will be proposed in the future, as the Fixing America's Surface Transportation Act initially authorized I-14.

The Texas Department of Transportation will upgrade US 190 from a two-lane highway to a four-lane divided highway from approximately two miles (3.2 km) south of Heidenheimer, Texas to the Bell County-Milam County line. The $77.8 million project will improve driving safety along 7.3 miles of US 190 in central Texas, as new hardened medians will separate each side of traffic. This continues previously completed upgrades along US 190 of two-lane to four-lane highways. The most recent of these improvements were made to the Heidenheimer area circa 2010.

== Junction list ==
State	County/Parish	Location	mi	km	Exit	Destinations	Notes
Texas	Pecos		0.00	0.00		I-10 – Fort Stockton, Ozona	Western terminus; I-10 exit 307
Texas	Pecos		4.2	6.8		FM 305 north – McCamey	
Texas	Pecos		9.4	15.1		SH 349 north – Rankin	Western end of SH 349 concurrency
Texas	Pecos	Iraan	14.0	22.5		SH 349 south	Eastern end of SH 349 concurrency
Texas	Crockett		42.1	67.8		SH 137 north – Big Lake	Western end of SH 137 concurrency
Texas	Crockett		44.0	70.8		SH 137 south – Ozona	Eastern end of SH 137 concurrency
Texas	Crockett		59.0	95.0		SH 163 – Barnhart, Ozona	
Texas	Schleicher		80.1	128.9		FM 1828 east	
Texas	Schleicher	Eldorado	92.6	149.0		US 277 south – Sonora, Del Rio	Western end of US 277 concurrency
Texas	Schleicher	Eldorado	93.1	149.8		US 277 north (Divide Street) / RM 915 north (Murchison Street) – San Angelo, Mertzon	Eastern end of US 277 concurrency
Texas	Schleicher	Eldorado	94.0	151.3		RM 2596 south	
Texas	Schleicher		110.0	177.0		RM 2084 north – Christoval	
Texas	Menard		127.0	204.4		FM 864 south – Fort McKavett, Sonora	
Texas	Menard	Menard	143.3	230.6		US 83 south (Frisco Avenue) – Junction, Uvalde	Western end of US 83 concurrency
Texas	Menard	Menard	144.5	232.6		US 83 north – Eden, Ballinger	North end of US 83 concurrency
Texas	McCulloch		164.5	264.7		FM 1311 south – Hext	
Texas	McCulloch	Brady	175.3	282.1		US 87 south / US 377 south (Bridge Street) – Mason, Junction, Fredericksburg	Western end of US 87/US 377 concurrency
Texas	McCulloch	Brady	175.6	282.6		FM 2028 west (17th Street) – Brady Reservoir, Melvin	Access to Heart of Texas Healthcare System
Texas	McCulloch	Brady	176.1	283.4		FM 2309 south (11th Street) to SH 71 east – Pontotoc, Llano	
Texas	McCulloch	Brady	176.7	284.4		US 87 north (Commerce Street) – Eden, San Angelo, Coleman	Eastern end of US 87 concurrency
Texas	McCulloch	Brady	176.8	284.5		FM 714 east (Main Street)	
Texas	McCulloch	Brady	177.6	285.8		US 377 north (Bridge Street) – Brownwood, Fort Worth	Eastern end of US 377 concurrency
Texas	McCulloch	Rochelle	187.3	301.4		FM 1121 west (SE 7th Street) to US 377	
Texas	McCulloch	Rochelle	188.4	303.2		FM 2315 north – Placid	
Texas	McCulloch		190.0	305.8		FM 2822 north – Mercury	
Texas	San Saba		197.4	317.7		FM 2997 north	
Texas	San Saba	Richland Springs	203.9	328.1		FM 45 north (Carter Street) – Brownwood, Camp Bowie Military Reservation	
Texas	San Saba	Harkeyville	214.1	344.6		FM 2732 west – Sloan	
Texas	San Saba		216.1	347.8		FM 1030 south	
Texas	San Saba	San Saba	218.5	351.6		SH 16 (High Street) – Goldthwaite, Llano	
Texas	San Saba	San Saba	218.6	351.8		FM 1031 south (Live Oak Street)	
Texas	San Saba		222.0	357.3		FM 580 east – Nix, Bend	
Texas	Lampasas	Lometa	237.6	382.4		FM 581 (Main Street) – Bend	
Texas	Lampasas	Lometa	238.6	384.0		US 183 north (4th Street) – Goldthwaite, Brownwood	Western end of US 183 concurrency
Texas	Lampasas	Lometa	239.3	385.1		FM 3415 south – Knight Mountain	
Texas	Lampasas		253.8	408.5		US 281 north – Hamilton	Western end of US 281 concurrency
Texas	Lampasas	Lampasas	254.3	409.3		FM 580 east (Avenue J)	Western end of FM 580 concurrency
Texas	Lampasas	Lampasas	254.9	410.2		FM 580 west (North Avenue) – Nix	Eastern end of FM 580 concurrency
Texas	Lampasas	Lampasas	255.2	410.7		Loop 257 (4th Street) – Lampasas Historic District	
Texas	Lampasas	Lampasas	255.5	411.2		Bus. US 281 south	
Texas	Lampasas	Lampasas	255.8	411.7		US 183 south (Key Avenue) / US 281 south (E. E. Ohnmeiss Jr. Drive) – Austin, Burnet, San Antonio	Eastern end of US 183 / US 281 concurrency
Texas	Lampasas	Lampasas	257.0	413.6		Loop 257 west (4th Street) – Lampasas Historic District	
Texas	Lampasas		264.6	425.8		FM 1715 north	
Texas	Lampasas	Kempner	266.2	428.4		FM 3170 south – Oakalla	
Texas	Lampasas	Kempner	267.3	430.2		FM 2313 north – Rumley	
Texas	Lampasas	Kempner	268.4	431.9		FM 2808 east	
Texas	Coryell	Copperas Cove	272.3	438.2		Bus. US 190 east / FM 2657 south – Briggs	
Texas	Coryell	Copperas Cove	272.9	439.2	—	FM 116 / FM 3046	Western end of super two
Texas	Coryell	Copperas Cove	275.7	443.7	—	Old Copperas Cove Road	
Texas	Coryell	Copperas Cove	277.4	446.4	—	I-14 begins Bus. US 190 west – Copperas Cove	Western end of I-14 concurrency; eastern end of super two, western end of freeway; westbound exit and eastbound entrance
Texas	Coryell	Fort Hood	277.8	447.1	277	Clarke Road	Exit numbers follow I-14
Texas	Coryell–Bell county line	Fort Hood	279.2	449.3	278	Bell Tower Drive	
Texas	Coryell–Bell county line	Fort Hood	279.7	450.1	280A	SH 201 south (Clear Creek Road) – Killeen Regional Airport	Access to AdventHealth Central Texas
Texas	Bell	Fort Hood	280.5	451.4	280B	Clear Creek Road north	Westbound access via exit 280A
Texas	Bell	Killeen	281.5	453.0	281	Bus. US 190 east / T. J. Mills Boulevard – Bernie Beck Main Gate	
Texas	Bell	Killeen	282.2	454.2	282	Willow Springs Road	
Texas	Bell	Killeen	282.7	455.0	283	SH 195 (Fort Hood Street)	
Texas	Bell	Killeen	284.6	458.0	284	Trimmier Road	
Texas	Bell	Killeen	285.2	459.0	285	W. S. Young Drive	
Texas	Bell	Killeen	286.2	460.6	286	FM 3470 (Stan Schlueter Loop) – Airport	Eastbound exit and westbound entrance; Access to Seton Medical Center Harker Heights
Texas	Bell	Killeen	287.5	462.7	287	Rosewood Drive	Access to Seton Medical Center Harker Heights
Texas	Bell	Harker Heights	288.2	463.8	288	FM 2410 (Knight's Way)	
Texas	Bell	Harker Heights	289.4	465.7	289	FM 3423 (Indian Trail)	
Texas	Bell	Harker Heights	290.7	467.8	290	Bus. US 190 west / Nola Ruth Boulevard	No westbound entrance
Texas	Bell	Nolanville	292.8	471.2	292	FM Spur 439 (Main Street) – Nolanville	
Texas	Bell	Nolanville	294.0	473.1	294	Paddy Hamilton Road	
Texas	Bell		295.8	476.0	295	Frontage Road	No eastbound entrance
Texas	Bell		297.1	478.1	296	FM 2410 (Simmons Road)	
Texas	Bell		297.6	478.9	297	George Wilson Road	
Texas	Bell	Belton	299.2	481.5	299	FM 1670 (Stillhouse Hollow Dam Road)	
Texas	Bell	Belton	300.5	483.6	300	Loop 121	
Texas	Bell	Belton	301.3– 302.4	484.9– 486.7	301	I-35 south / SH 317 / FM 436 / Connell Street – Austin I-14 ends	Eastern end of I-14 concurrency; current eastern terminus of I-14; western end of I-35 concurrency; US 190 west follows I-35 exit 293A
Texas	Bell	Belton			293B	SH 317 north (Main Street) / FM 436 east	Exit numbers follow I-35; eastbound access via exit 301
Texas	Bell	Belton	302.6	487.0	294A	Spur 253 (Central Avenue)	
Texas	Bell	Belton	302.9	487.5	294B	FM 93 (6th Avenue)	
Texas	Bell	Temple	305.7	492.0	297	Midway Drive	
Texas	Bell	Temple	306.6	493.4		I-35 north – Waco	Eastern end of freeway; eastern end of I-35 concurrency; I-35 exit 299
Texas	Bell	Temple	306.6	493.4		SH 36 west / Loop 363 west – Gatesville	Western end of freeway; western end of SH 36/Loop 363 concurrency
Texas	Bell	Temple	308.2	496.0	—	57th Street	
Texas	Bell	Temple	308.5	496.5	—	FM 1741 (31st Street)	
Texas	Bell	Temple	309.4	497.9	—	5th Street	Eastern end of freeway
Texas	Bell	Temple	310.7	500.0		Spur 290 north (1st Street)	
Texas	Bell	Temple	311.9	502.0		Loop 363 north to I-35 north – Waco SH 95 south – Taylor	Eastern end of Loop 363 concurrency; interchange
Texas	Bell	Temple	312.6	503.1		FM 3117 east – Oscar	
Texas	Bell	Heidenheimer	313.5	504.5		Bus. US 190 east – Cameron	
Texas	Bell	Heidenheimer	314.0– 315.3	505.3– 507.4		FM 93 / FM 436 – Belton, Little River-Academy	Interchange; signed as separate exits westbound
Texas	Bell	Heidenheimer	315.9	508.4		Bus. US 190 west – Temple	
Texas	Bell	Rogers	322.8	519.5		FM 437 / FM 2184 (Alvin Ailey Street) – Davilla, Zabcikville	
Texas	Milam	Buckholts	330.1	531.2		FM 1915 north (4th Street)	Western end of FM 1915 concurrency
Texas	Milam	Buckholts	330.2	531.4		FM 1915 south (8th Street) – Davilla	Eastern end of FM 1915 concurrency
Texas	Milam		333.4	536.6		FM 486 south – Thorndale	
Texas	Milam	Cameron	336.9	542.2		FM 845 east – Milano	
Texas	Milam	Cameron	338.7	545.1		FM 2269 north – Zabcikville	
Texas	Milam	Cameron	339.7	546.7		US 77 north / FM 1600 south (Travis Avenue) to FM 845 west – Waco, Temple	Western end of US 77 concurrency
Texas	Milam		342.3	550.9		FM 2095 east – Gause, Hearne	
Texas	Milam		343.2	552.3		US 77 south – Rockdale, Giddings	Eastern end of US 77 concurrency
Texas	Milam	Milano	352.1	566.7		US 79 south (Avenue C) – Rockdale, Taylor	Western end of US 79 concurrency
Texas	Milam	Milano	353.0	568.1		FM 3242 north – Hanover	
Texas	Milam	Milano	353.4	568.7		SH 36 south – Caldwell, Brenham	Eastern end of SH 36 concurrency
Texas	Milam	Gause	362.6	583.5		FM 2095 west – Cameron	
Texas	Robertson		368.7	593.4		FM 1644 north – Calvert, Franklin	
Texas	Robertson		370.8	596.7		FM 50 south – Mumford, Mooring	
Texas	Robertson	Hearne	373.0	600.3		US 79 north / SH 6 north (Market Street) / FM 391 east (Brown Street) – Franklin, Marlin, Wheelock	Eastern end of US 79 concurrency; western end of SH 6 concurrency; interchange
Texas	Robertson		378.3	608.8		FM 2549 north – Elliott	
Texas	Robertson	Benchley	384.7	619.1	—	SH OSR (Old San Antonio Road) / Spur 231	Western end of Earl Rudder Freeway
Texas	Brazos	Bryan	387.1	623.0	—	FM 2818 (Harvey Mitchell Parkway) – College Station	
Texas	Brazos	Bryan	388.2	624.7	—	Bus. SH 6 south – Bryan	Eastbound exit and westbound entrance
Texas	Brazos	Bryan	389.5	626.8	—	Woodville Road	
Texas	Brazos	Bryan	390.7	628.8	—	FM 974 (Tabor Road)	
Texas	Brazos	Bryan	392.3	631.3		SH 6 south / SH 21 west – Caldwell, Houston	Interchange; eastern end of freeway section; eastern end of SH 6 concurrency; western end of SH 21 concurrency
Texas	Brazos	Wixon Valley	397.2	639.2		FM 2776 north / Andert Road	
Texas	Brazos	Kurten	400.1	643.9		Bus. SH 21 east – Kurten	
Texas	Brazos	Kurten	400.5	644.5		FM 2038	
Texas	Brazos	Kurten	401.4	646.0		Bus. SH 21 west – Kurten	
Texas	Brazos		406.6	654.4		FM 974 west	
Texas	Madison		410.1	660.0		FM 2865 north	
Texas	Madison	North Zulch	413.8	665.9		FM 39 – Normangee, Iola	Interchange
Texas	Madison	North Zulch	414.0	666.3		Loop 160 east (Trinity Avenue)	
Texas	Madison	North Zulch	414.5	667.1		Loop 160 west (5th Street)	
Texas	Madison		422.0	679.1		FM 1372 south	
Texas	Madison		424.4	683.0		FM 1452 west	Western end of FM 1452 concurrency
Texas	Madison		424.7	683.5		FM 1452 east	Eastern end of FM 1452 concurrency
Texas	Madison	Madisonville	426.3	686.1		FM 974 north	
Texas	Madison	Madisonville	426.6	686.5		Spur 174 south (Madison Street)	Access to St. Joseph Health Madison Hospital
Texas	Madison	Madisonville	426.8	686.9		SH 75 (May Street) to SH 90 – Buffalo, Huntsville, Navasota	
Texas	Madison	Madisonville	428.8	690.1		I-45 north / SH 21 east – Dallas, Crockett	Eastern end of SH 21 concurrency; western end of I-45 concurrency; I-45 exit 142
Texas	Madison		433.9	698.3	136	Spur 67	Exit numbers follow I-45
Texas	Walker		438.3	705.4	132	FM 2989	Exit numbers follow I-45
Texas	Walker		447.8	720.7	123	FM 1696	Exit numbers follow I-45
Texas	Walker	Huntsville	451.8	727.1	118	SH 75 / FM 1791 – Airport	Exit numbers follow I-45
Texas	Walker	Huntsville	454.3	731.1		I-45 south / SH 30 west – Houston, Bryan	Eastern end of I-45 concurrency; western end of SH 30 concurrency; I-45 exit 116
Texas	Walker	Huntsville	455.1	732.4		SH 75 north – Madisonville	Western end of SH 75 concurrency
Texas	Walker	Huntsville	455.4	732.9		FM 247 north (Avenue M) – Midway	
Texas	Walker	Huntsville	455.5	733.1		SH 75 south (Sam Houston Avenue)	Eastern end of SH 75 concurrency
Texas	Walker	Huntsville	456.2	734.2		SH 30 east (Riverside Drive) – Trinity	Eastern end of SH 30 concurrency
Texas	Walker	Huntsville	457.2	735.8		SH 19 – Trinity, Houston	Interchange
Texas	Walker		459.2	739.0		FM 2929 south	
Texas	Walker		462.5	744.3		FM 2296 south – New Waverly	
Texas	Walker		465.1	748.5		FM 405 north – Dodge, Crockett	
Texas	San Jacinto	Oakhurst	470.5	757.2		FM 946 – Coldspring	
Texas	San Jacinto	Point Blank	476.3	766.5		SH 156 south – Coldspring, Shepherd	
Texas	San Jacinto		479.2	771.2		FM 980 – Riverside, Lake Livingston	
Texas	Polk	Onalaska				Bridge over Trinity River	
Texas	Polk	Onalaska	484.4	779.6		FM 356 – Trinity	
Texas	Polk	Onalaska	485.1	780.7		FM 3186 south – Lake Livingston	
Texas	Polk	Onalaska	485.3	781.0		FM 3459 north	
Texas	Polk		486.9	783.6		FM 3152 east to FM 350 – Moscow	
Texas	Polk		490.3	789.1		FM 3126 south	
Texas	Polk	Livingston	493.3	793.9		FM 2457 west – Lake Livingston	
Texas	Polk	Livingston	496.2	798.6		FM 350 east – Moscow	Western end of FM 350 concurrency
Texas	Polk	Livingston	496.4	798.9		FM 350 west – Lake Livingston	Eastern end of FM 350 concurrency
Texas	Polk	Livingston	497.3	800.3		Future I-69 / US 59 – Corrigan, Lufkin, Shepherd, Cleveland	US 59 exit 434B; Access to St. Luke's Health - Memorial Hospital - Livingston, TX
Texas	Polk	Livingston	498.6	802.4		Bus. US 59 (North Washington Avenue)	
Texas	Polk	Livingston	498.7	802.6		SH 146 (Houston Avenue)	
Texas	Polk		510.2	821.1		FM 1276 east – Dallardsville	
Texas	Polk	Alabama- Coushatta Reservation	512.2	824.3		FM 2500 north – Camden	
Texas	Polk	Alabama- Coushatta Reservation				PR 56 – Tombigbee Lake	
Texas	Tyler		525.8	846.2		FM 256 east – Colmesneil	
Texas	Tyler	Woodville	531.1	854.7		US 69 / US 287 (Magnolia Street) – Lufkin, Corrigan, Kountze, Beaumont	
Texas	Tyler	Woodville	531.6	855.5		FM 1746 east	
Texas	Tyler		541.6	871.6		FM 256 west – Colmesneil	
Texas	Tyler		543.6	874.8		FM 92 – Spurger, Silsbee	
Texas	B.A. Steinhagen Lake					Dam B	
Texas	Jasper		547.0	880.3		PR 48 – Martin Dies Jr. State Park	
Texas	Jasper		550.1	885.3		FM 1747 north – Bevilport	
Texas	Jasper	Science Hall	550.4	885.8		FM 777 – Curtis, Beech Grove	
Texas	Jasper	Jasper	555.7	894.3		FM 777	
Texas	Jasper	Jasper	556.7	895.9		SH 63 west – Zavalla, Lufkin	Western end of SH 63 concurrency
Texas	Jasper	Jasper	557.5	897.2		FM 252 south (Springhill Road) – Erin, Kirbyville	
Texas	Jasper	Jasper	558.3	898.5		US 96 (Wheeler Street) – Pineland, San Augustine, Kirbyville, Beaumont	
Texas	Jasper	Jasper	559.4	900.3		SH 63 east – Burkeville, Leesville	Eastern end of SH 63 concurrency
Texas	Jasper	Holly Springs	565.4	909.9		FM 1408 north to SH 63 –	
Texas	Newton	Newton	572.6	921.5		FM 1012 north – Jamestown	
Texas	Newton	Newton	573.4	922.8		SH 87 – Burkeville, Hemphill, Deweyville, Orange	
Texas	Newton	Newton	573.8	923.4		Loop 505 south (Kaufman Street) – Bleakwood, Deweyville	Western end of Loop 505 concurrency
Texas	Newton	Newton	573.9	923.6		Loop 505 north (Court Street) – Burkeville, Hemphill	Eastern end of Loop 505 concurrency
Texas	Newton	Buckhorn	581.5	935.8		FM 2626 – Burkeville	
Texas	Newton	Bon Wier	583.7	939.4		FM 363 west – Bleakwood, Kirbyville	
Texas	Newton	Bon Wier	584.5	940.7		FM 1416 south – Trout Creek	
Sabine River			586.8 0.00	944.4 0.00		Texas–Louisiana line	
Louisiana	Beauregard	Merryville	3.5	5.6		LA 389 south (Carter Avenue) – Fields, DeQuincy	
Louisiana	Beauregard	Merryville	4.7	7.6		LA 110 east – Singer, Longville	
Louisiana	Beauregard		9.8	15.8		LA 111 north – Burr Ferry	
Louisiana	Beauregard		19.3	31.1		LA 3226 north – Rosepine	
Louisiana	Beauregard	DeRidder	22.7	36.5		LA 3099 south (Texas Street) – Merryville, Newton	
Louisiana	Beauregard	DeRidder	23.1	37.2		US 171 north / LA 27 south (Pine Street) – Leesville, DeQuincy	Western end of US 171 concurrency; Access to Beauregard Health System
Louisiana	Beauregard		25.4	40.9		LA 112 east – Sugartown, Alexandria	
Louisiana	Beauregard		26.9	43.3		LA 26 east – Oberlin, Eunice	
Louisiana	Beauregard		29.6	47.6		LA 394 east – Dry Creek	
Louisiana	Beauregard	Longville	42.1	67.8		LA 110 west – Singer, Merryville	
Louisiana	Beauregard	Ragley	48.4	77.9		US 171 south / LA 12 west – Lake Charles, DeQuincy, Kinder, Beaumont	Eastern end of US 171 concurrency; interchange
Louisiana	Allen	Reeves	60.0	96.6		LA 113 north – Dry Creek, Pitkin	
Louisiana	Allen	Kinder	72.0	115.9		LA 1150 east (4th Avenue) to US 165	
Louisiana	Allen	Kinder	72.4	116.5		US 165 – Oberlin, Alexandria, Iowa, Lake Charles	
Louisiana	Allen	Kinder	73.4	118.1		LA 383 south (1st Avenue) – Iowa	
Louisiana	Allen		77.0	123.9		LA 99 south – Welsh	
Louisiana	Jefferson Davis	Elton	81.1	130.5		LA 395 south (Raymond Church Road) – Roanoke	
Louisiana	Jefferson Davis		83.2	133.9		LA 26 to LA 1130 west – Oberlin, DeRidder, Jennings	
Louisiana	Bayou Nezpique					Jefferson Davis–Acadia parish line	
Louisiana	Acadia–Evangeline parish line	Basile	87.3	140.5		LA 1157-2 north – Basile Business District	
Louisiana	Acadia–Evangeline parish line	Basile	87.9	141.5		LA 3277 north	
Louisiana	Acadia–Evangeline parish line		88.5	142.4		LA 97 south (Evangeline Highway) – Evangeline	
Louisiana	Acadia–Evangeline parish line		91.8	147.7		LA 3068 south	
Louisiana	Bayou des Cannes					Evangeline–St. Landry parish line	
Louisiana	St. Landry	Eunice	97.1	156.3		LA 757 – L.S.U.-Eunice, Eunice High School	
Louisiana	St. Landry	Eunice	98.6	158.7		LA 13 (C.C. Duson Street) – Mamou, Crowley	
Louisiana	St. Landry		101.8	163.8		LA 367 south	
Louisiana	St. Landry		103.3	166.2		LA 758 north / LA 95 south – Church Point	Western end of LA 95 concurrency
Louisiana	St. Landry		104.6	168.3		LA 95 north	Eastern end of LA 95 concurrency
Louisiana	St. Landry		108.0	173.8		LA 752 east	
Louisiana	St. Landry		111.1	178.8		LA 103 north	
Louisiana	St. Landry	Lawtell	112.6	181.2		LA 35 south – Rayne	
Louisiana	St. Landry	Opelousas	117.6	189.3		LA 104 west	
Louisiana	St. Landry	Opelousas	118.0	189.9		LA 357 south	
Louisiana	St. Landry	Opelousas	119.0	191.5		LA 182 – Washington, Sunset	Access to Opelousas General Health System-Main Campus
Louisiana	St. Landry		119.9– 120.2	193.0– 193.4		I-49 / US 167 – Alexandria, Lafayette	Interchange; I-49 exit 19
Louisiana	St. Landry		123.5	198.8		LA 743	
Louisiana	St. Landry		125.9	202.6		LA 742 west	
Louisiana	St. Landry	Port Barre	126.0	202.8		LA 103 south – Leonville	Western end of LA 103 concurrency
Louisiana	St. Landry	Port Barre	126.3	203.3		LA 103 north – Washington	Eastern end of LA 103 concurrency
Louisiana	St. Landry		127.2	204.7		LA 741 – Port Barre	
Louisiana	St. Landry		135.4	217.9		US 71 north – Alexandria	Interchange; southern terminus of US 71
Louisiana	St. Landry		137.7	221.6		LA 3174 east – Krotz Springs	
Louisiana	St. Landry	Krotz Springs	138.6	223.1		LA 3178 east – Krotz Springs	
Louisiana	St. Landry	Krotz Springs	138.7	223.2		LA 105 – Melville	Interchange
Louisiana	Atchafalaya River					Frank and Sal Diesi Bridge	
Louisiana	Pointe Coupee		139.7	224.8		LA 975 south – East Krotz Springs	Interchange
Louisiana	Pointe Coupee	Lottie	145.7	234.5		LA 81 – Morganza	
Louisiana	Pointe Coupee		148.2	238.5		LA 976 south	
Louisiana	Pointe Coupee	Livonia	150.6	242.4		LA 77 – Morganza, Plaquemine	
Louisiana	Pointe Coupee	Livonia	150.7	242.5		LA 78 north (Mississippi River Trail) / LA 411 south (Maringouin Road East)	
Louisiana	Pointe Coupee		154.7	249.0		LA 978 north	
Louisiana	Pointe Coupee		157.9	254.1		LA 1 north – New Roads	Western end of LA 1 concurrency
Louisiana	West Baton Rouge		159.9	257.3		LA 413 – Erwinville	
Louisiana	West Baton Rouge		164.5	264.7		LA 983 north	
Louisiana	West Baton Rouge		169.3	272.5		LA 415 to I-10	Interchange
Louisiana	West Baton Rouge		172.3	277.3		LA 1 south to I-10 – Port Allen, Plaquemine	Interchange; eastern end of LA 1 concurrency
Louisiana	Mississippi River					Huey P. Long Bridge	
Louisiana	East Baton Rouge		174.0	280.0		Mississippi River turnaround	Interchange; westbound exit and eastbound entrance
Louisiana	East Baton Rouge	Baton Rouge	174.6	281.0	—	US 61 Bus. south / US 190 Bus. east (Scenic Highway south)	Western end of freeway
Louisiana	East Baton Rouge	Baton Rouge	174.9	281.5	—	US 61 north (Scenic Highway north) – Scotlandville	Western end of US 61 concurrency
Louisiana	East Baton Rouge	Baton Rouge	175.3	282.1	—	I-110 – Natchez, Baton Rouge	I-110 exit 5B
Louisiana	East Baton Rouge	Baton Rouge	175.6	282.6	—	LA 67 (Plank Road)	Eastern end of freeway
Louisiana	East Baton Rouge	Baton Rouge	179.3– 179.5	288.6– 288.9		LA 37 east / Greenwell Springs Road	Interchange
Louisiana	East Baton Rouge	Baton Rouge	181.2– 181.4	291.6– 291.9		US 61 south (Airline Highway east) / US 61 Bus. north / US 190 Bus. west (Florida Boulevard west) – Downtown, New Orleans	Cloverleaf interchange; eastern end of US 61 concurrency
Louisiana	East Baton Rouge		187.7	302.1		LA 423 west (Old Hammond Highway)	
Louisiana	Livingston	Denham Springs	189.2	304.5		LA 1032 (River Road)	
Louisiana	Livingston	Denham Springs	190.7	306.9		LA 16 north / LA 3002 south to I-12 – Watson	Western end of LA 16 concurrency
Louisiana	Livingston	Denham Springs	191.5	308.2		LA 1031 north / LA 16 south – Gonzales	Eastern end of LA 16 concurrency
Louisiana	Livingston		193.1	310.8		LA 1026 south	Western end of LA 1026 concurrency
Louisiana	Livingston		193.8	311.9		LA 1026 north	Eastern end of LA 1026 concurrency
Louisiana	Livingston	Walker	196.4	316.1		LA 447 – Prairieville	
Louisiana	Livingston	Walker	197.3	317.5		LA 1029 north	
Louisiana	Livingston	Walker	198.0	318.7		LA 449 north – Pine Grove	
Louisiana	Livingston	Satsuma	199.8	321.5		LA 1024 north	
Louisiana	Livingston	Livingston	203.0	326.7		LA 63 north	Western end of LA 63 concurrency
Louisiana	Livingston	Livingston	203.3	327.2		LA 63 south – Killian	Eastern end of LA 63 concurrency
Louisiana	Livingston	Holden	208.0	334.7		LA 441	
Louisiana	Livingston	Albany	213.2	343.1		LA 43 – Montpelier	
Louisiana	Tangipahoa	Hammond	217.8– 218.0	350.5– 350.8		I-55 – Jackson, New Orleans	Interchange; I-55 exit 31
Louisiana	Tangipahoa	Hammond	218.4	351.5		LA 3260 east	
Louisiana	Tangipahoa	Hammond	219.2	352.8		US 51 – Amite, Ponchatoula	
Louisiana	Tangipahoa	Hammond	220.5	354.9		US 51 Bus. (Railroad Avenue)	
Louisiana	Tangipahoa	Hammond	221.5	356.5		LA 443 north	
Louisiana	Tangipahoa	Hammond	223.4	359.5		LA 3158 south	
Louisiana	Tangipahoa		225.4	362.7		LA 1064 north	
Louisiana	Tangipahoa		226.1	363.9		LA 1067 south	
Louisiana	Tangipahoa	Robert	227.7	366.4		LA 445	
Louisiana	St. Tammany		236.3	380.3		LA 1077 – Goodbee	
Louisiana	St. Tammany	Covington	240.7	387.4		US 190 Bus. east – Covington	
Louisiana	St. Tammany	Covington	242.2	389.8		LA 25 north – Franklinton	
Louisiana	St. Tammany	Covington	243.6	392.0		LA 437 north	
Louisiana	St. Tammany	Covington	244.5	393.5		US 190 Bus. west to LA 21 north	Interchange via ramps westbound and connector road eastbound
Louisiana	St. Tammany		247.2– 247.7	397.8– 398.6		I-12 – Gulfport, Baton Rouge	Interchange; west end of expressway; I-12 exits 63A-B
Louisiana	St. Tammany		248.6	400.1	—	Judge Tanner Boulevard / Fairway Drive	
Louisiana	St. Tammany	Mandeville	249.7	401.9		LA 22 west (Emerald Road west) / Causeway Boulevard – New Orleans (Via Causeway Toll Bridge), Ponchatoula	Interchange; east end of expressway section
Louisiana	St. Tammany	Mandeville	252.0	405.6		East Causeway Approach	To Lake Pontchartrain Causeway
Louisiana	St. Tammany	Mandeville	253.0	407.2		LA 59 north to I-12	
Louisiana	St. Tammany		255.6	411.3		LA 1089 south – Fontainbleau State Park	
Louisiana	St. Tammany	Lacombe	261.2	420.4		LA 434 south	Western end of LA 434 concurrency
Louisiana	St. Tammany	Lacombe	261.6	421.0		LA 434 north to I-12	Roundabout; eastern end of LA 434 concurrency
Louisiana	St. Tammany		267.7	430.8		LA 433 south	
Louisiana	St. Tammany	Slidell	271.2	436.5		US 11 / US 190 Bus. east – Pearl River, Slidell	
Louisiana	St. Tammany	Slidell	272.9	439.2		I-10 – Gulfport, New Orleans	I-10 exit 266
Louisiana	St. Tammany		274.8	442.2		LA 1090 north	
Louisiana	St. Tammany		277.0	445.8		US 190 Bus. west – Slidell	
Louisiana	St. Tammany	White Kitchen	280.8	451.9		US 90 (Chef Menteur Highway)	Eastern terminus
1.000 mi = 1.609 km; 1.000 km = 0.621 mi: Concurrency terminus; Incomplete access

== Business routes ==
US 190 has six business routes: three in Texas and three in Louisiana.

=== Copperas Cove ===
Business U.S. Highway 190
- Location: Copperas Cove, Texas
- Length: 4.5 mi (7.2 km)
- Existed: Jan 29, 2015–present

Business U.S. Highway 190-E is a 4.5 mile (7.2 km) long business route that runs through downtown Copperas Cove. In 2010, the Texas Department of Transportation was given approval by the American Association of State Highway and Transportation Officials (AASHTO) to move US 190 to a new bypass on the south side of Copperas Cove, leaving the original alignment to be made into a business route. The project had been in the planning phases since the 1980s. After delays due to the construction of what would become I-14 to the east of Copperas Cove, the $46.5 million bypass opened on January 29, 2015, and the original alignment became Business US 190.

Business US 190's western terminus is located at a signaled intersection with US 190 and Farm to Market Road 2657 (FM 2657). Though signed east–west, the first section of the road runs north-to-northeast toward the city center of Copperas Cove. Turning east after, the road intersects FM 116, where FM 116 forms a short concurrency with Business US 190 for three blocks. After the concurrency, FM 116 breaks off and continues north towards downtown. Continuing eastward, the road intersects northbound FM 1113 and begins to enter the commercial district of Copperas Cove. The road continues due east past the town's center until it merges with I-14, US 190, and State Highway 9 (SH 9). There is no direct access from eastbound Business US 190 to westbound I-14/US 190 or SH 9.

=== Killeen ===
Business U.S. Highway 190
- Location: Killeen, Texas
- Length: 9.1 mi (14.6 km)
- Existed: 1991–present

Business U.S. Highway 190-F is a 9.09 mile (14.6 km) long business route that runs through downtown Killeen that follows an old alignment of US 190. When US 190 was moved off the original route to a southern bypass around both Killeen and the town of Harker Heights in 1975, the remaining route was initially declared as State Loop 518. In an overhaul of state loop designations throughout Texas, however, the Texas Department of Transportation converted many former U.S. route and state highway alignments into business routes, thus creating Business U.S. Highway 190.

Business US 190 begins at a partial cloverleaf interchange with I-14/US 190 and Hood Road. This interchange is located within the boundaries of Fort Hood; the only access to the army base directly from US 190 Business is via Hood Road. The route continues east as Veterans Memorial Boulevard. It intersects State Highway 195 (Fort Hood Road) as the business route exits Fort Hood and enters Killeen city limits. The business route passes through downtown Killeen and crosses FM 439 once passing the commercial district. Continuing eastward, the route passes by Skylark Field Airport and enters Harker Heights, where it intersects both FM 3423 and FM 3219. Approaching US 190, the business route splits: according to the Texas Department of Transportation, the official west-to-east alignment of the route forks to Edwards Drive, while the east-to-west alignment continues on Veterans Memorial Boulevard, though both directions are signed as the business route on the boulevard. At either designation, the roads both lost the designation at their respective I-14/US 190 intersections.

=== Heidenheimer ===
Business U.S. Highway 190
- Location: Heidenheimer, Texas
- Length: 2.5 mi (4.0 km)
- Existed: 2010–present

Business U.S. Highway 190-J is a 2.5 mile (4.0 km) long business route that runs through the town of Heidenheimer along an old alignment of US 190. As US 190 has come to be a major thoroughfare through central Texas, traffic could not handle the two lane road in the primarily residential area. With houses on both sides of the road close to the roadway, a bypass was needed by the mid-2000s. A new four-lane bypass around Heidenheimer looped west around the town, opening in 2010. In October 2010, the AASHTO approved the movement of US 190 to the new bypass. Later in 2010, the Texas Department of Transportation requested AASHTO to also approve the new Business U.S. Highway 190, which had been signed by Texas since US 190's movement. The highway has been subsequently approved and the business route continues to be signed as such.

Though more aligned north-to-south, the business route is signed west-to-east. It begins at a T-intersection with US 190 westbound. The entrance to Business US 190 is not accessible from the eastbound lanes of US 190 as a grass median divides the highway. Once on the business route, it turns almost immediately to the right and begins a southeasterly track towards the town of Heidenheimer. Another access road from US 190 allows eastbound traffic to turn onto the business route. This connector is signed as 'TO BUSINESS US 190' from the mainline road. Continuing eastward, the road intersects FM 93 at its eastern terminus, also allowing access to US 190. Entering the main residential part of the small town, the eastern terminus of FM 436 intersects Business US 190. Only slightly further east is Business US 190's eastern terminus, where traffic returns to US 190.

=== Baton Rouge ===
U.S. Highway 190 Business
- Location: Baton Rouge, Louisiana
- Length: 10.8 mi (17.4 km)
- Existed: 1960–present

U.S. Highway 61/190 Business, also called Florida Boulevard and internally designated as U.S. Highway 61-X, is a 10.8 mile (17.4 km) business route that runs along the old alignment of both US 61 and US 190 through downtown Baton Rouge. Although US 190 is signed as a west-to-east route, US 61/190 Business generally does not have directional signage and changes directions multiple times.

From southeast to northwest, the business route begins at a cloverleaf interchange with both US 190, which continues east toward Hammond, and US 61, which continues south toward New Orleans. Both mainline routes come together to form a concurrency and continue northward along the Airline Highway, while the continuing road from US 190 becomes the business route. The route continues west through a primarily commercial area and past Baton Rouge Community College before entering downtown Baton Rouge. I-110 northbound has a direct exit to US 61/190 Business (Exit 1C) in downtown Baton Rouge, while southbound motorists must use N. 9th Street (Exit 1G) to connect directly to the business route. US 61/190 Business continues west through downtown until it reaches River Road where it turns right and continues north.

Moving north, the business route passes one block to the left of the Louisiana State Capitol and along the Mississippi River before merging onto N. 3rd Street and entering an industrial area. The road curves and becomes Chippewa Street where it now heads east toward I-110. At US 61/190 Business' intersection with Louisiana State Highway 3164, the route turns to the left onto Scenic Highway, now heading north again, running parallel to I-110. The route continues about 2.5 miles (4 km) before reaching its northern terminus at US 61/190. At this point, Scenic Highway is taken over by US 61, now heading north towards Natchez and US 190 continues westward towards Opelousas.

Although US 61/190 Business has been signed as such since 1960, it did not formally get approval from the American Association of State Highway Officials (AASHO) until 1968.

=== Covington ===
U.S. Highway 190 Business
- Location: Covington, Louisiana
- Length: 3.31 mi (5.33 km)
- Existed: 1969–present

U.S. Highway 190 Business, also known as 21st Avenue or Boston Street and internally known as U.S. Highway 190-X, is a 3.31 mile (5.33 km) long business route that runs on the old alignment of US 190 through Covington.

The road begins at an intersection with US 190 to the west of downtown Covington. The business route continues eastbound into downtown Covington until it reaches Louisiana Highway 21 (LA 21). From here, LA 21 begins to run concurrently with US 190 Business until it returns to US 190 on the east side of Covington. The route was approved by AASHO in June 1969, along with the US 190 rerouting.

=== Slidell ===
U.S. Highway 190 Business
- Location: Slidell, Louisiana
- Length: 3.94 mi (6.34 km)
- Existed: 1971–present

U.S. Highway 190 Business, also known as Fremaux Avenue and internally known as U.S. Highway 190-Y, is a 3.94 mile (6.34 km) long business route that runs on most of the old alignment of US 190 through Slidell. The road begins at the intersection of US 11 (Front Street) and Fremaux Avenue in the 'Olde Towne' neighborhood of Slidell. The business route continues eastbound on Fremaux Avenue until it ends at US 190 (Military Road), where US 190 turns eastbound once again and takes over Fremaux Avenue.

When I-10 was constructed in Slidell in the 1960s, the proximity of a weigh station could not allow an exit to be built at then-US 190. Nearby Gause Road (then Louisiana Highway 1092), which paralleled the former US 190, was chosen as the I-10 exit in Slidell. After increased traffic on Gause Road and motorist confusion accessing US 190, the state of Louisiana petitioned AASHO to re-route the highway and create a new business route. At AASHO's June 1971 meeting, this request was approved. US 190 was permanently routed onto the now widened Gause Boulevard and Military Road while US 190 Business was signed along the former routing by 1975.

Following Hurricane Katrina in 2005, the weigh station on I-10 near the US 190 Business overpass was permanently closed and razed. In 2006, the Louisiana Department of Transportation and Development (LaDOTD) began construction on a new interchange at US 190 Business at the request of the St. Tammany Parish government and the City of Slidell. Extensive traffic backups at the US 190 (Gause Boulevard) interchange and the planning of a new retail center prompted this to be one of many projects to revitalize the area following Hurricane Katrina. Originally scheduled to open in the spring of 2008, multiple instances of severe weather, the threat of Hurricane Gustav, and signage delays pushed the opening of the interchange to late September 2008.

Although approved to sign the business route concurrently with US 11 to US 190 in 'Olde Towne' Slidell, the route officially begins at US 11.
