= Texas State Highway 201 =

State highway in Texas

State Highway 201
- Clear Creek Road
- SH 201, highlighted in blue

Route information
- Maintained by TxDOT
- Length: 7.567 mi (12.178 km)
- Existed: 2002–present

Major junctions
- South end: SH 195 in Killeen
- North end: I-14 / US 190 at Fort Cavazos

Location
- Country: United States
- State: Texas

Highway system
- Highways in Texas; Interstate; US; State; Former; Toll; Loops; Spurs; FM/RM; Park; Rec
← SH 200	→ SH 202

State Highway 201 (SH 201) is a short state highway that runs from I-14/US 190 south past Killeen Regional Airport, then east to SH 195.

== Route description ==
SH 201 begins at a junction with SH 195 in Killeen. It heads from this junction and then curves towards the north to an intersection with FM 3470 in Killeen. SH 201 reaches its northern terminus at I-14/US 190 at Fort Cavazos.

== History ==
SH 201 was designated on January 9, 1934 on a route from SH 126 in Munday to SH 24/US 82 for the purpose of assisting in moving a bridge. This route was cancelled when work was completed on September 11, 1934. The current route was designated on January 31, 2002.

== Junction list ==
The entire route is in Bell County.

Location	mi	km	Destinations	Notes
Killeen	0.0	0.0	SH 195 (Fort Hood Street)	Interchange
Killeen	5.4	8.7	FM 3470 (Stan Schlueter Loop)	
Fort Cavazos	7.6	12.2	I-14 / US 190 (Central Texas Expressway)	I-14/US 190 exit 280; northern terminus
1.000 mi = 1.609 km; 1.000 km = 0.621 mi
