= Texas State Highway 317 =

State highway in Texas

State Highway 317
- SH 317, highlighted in red

Route information
- Maintained by TxDOT
- Length: 44.791 mi (72.084 km)
- Existed: 1939–present

Major junctions
- South end: I-14 / I-35 / US 190 in Belton
- US 84 in McGregor
- North end: SH 6 in Valley Mills

Location
- Country: United States
- State: Texas

Highway system
- Highways in Texas; Interstate; US; State; Former; Toll; Loops; Spurs; FM/RM; Park; Rec
| ← SH 316 | → SH 318 |

State Highway 317 (SH 317) is a Texas state highway that runs north–south from Valley Mills to the intersection of Interstate 35, Interstate 14, and U.S. Highway 190 in Belton. This route was designated on May 23, 1939 from Belton to McGregor, with an extension north to Valley Mills on October 29, 1947.

== Route description ==
SH 317 begins at a junction with I-35 and I-14/US 190 in Belton. It heads northeast from this junction to an intersection with FM 93 as it continues through Belton. The highway continues to the northeast through Belton to an intersection with FM 439. Heading towards the northeast, the highway continues to a junction with FM 2305 in Temple. The highway continues to the northeast through Temple to an intersection with SH 36. It continues to the northeast to a junction with FM 1237. As the highway continues to the northeast, it intersects FM 2601. It heads northeast from this junction to an intersection with FM 107 in Moody. The highway continues to the northwest to an intersection with FM 2671. Heading towards the northwest, the highway continues to a junction with US 84 in McGregor. As the highway continues to the northwest through McGregor, it intersects FM 3047. It continues to the northwest to a junction with FM 185 in Crawford. SH 317 reaches its northern terminus at SH 6 in Valley Mills.

== Junction list ==
| County | Location | mi | km | Destinations | Notes |
|---|---|---|---|---|---|
| Bell | Belton | | | I-14 / I-35 / US 190 | Eastern terminus of I-14 at I-35 |
| Bell | Belton | | | FM 93 (2nd Avenue) | |
| Bell | Belton | | | FM 93 (6th Avenue) | |
| Bell | Belton | | | FM 439 | |
| Bell | Temple | | | FM 2305 (Adams Avenue) | |
| Bell | Temple | | | SH 36 | |
| Bell | | | | FM 1237 | |
| Bell | | | | FM 2601 | |
| McLennan | Moody | | | FM 107 (7th Street / 8th Street) | |
| McLennan | | | | FM 2671 | |
| McLennan | McGregor | | | US 84 (McGregor Drive) | |
| McLennan | McGregor | | | FM 3047 | |
| McLennan | Crawford | | | FM 185 (5th Street) | |
| Bosque | Valley Mills | | | SH 6 (Avenue C) | |
1.000 mi = 1.609 km; 1.000 km = 0.621 mi
