= Interstate 14 =

Interstate Highway in Texas

Interstate 14
- 14th Amendment Highway; Gulf Coast Strategic Highway; Central Texas Corridor
- I-14 highlighted in red

Route information
- Maintained by TxDOT
- Length: 25.1 mi (40.4 km)
- Existed: January 26, 2017–present
- NHS: Entire route

Major junctions
- West end: Bus. US 190 / US 190 near Copperas Cove
- SH 201 at Fort Hood; SH 195 at Killeen; Loop 121 at Killeen; SH 317 at Belton
- East end: I-35 / US 190 at Belton

Location
- Country: United States
- State: Texas
- Counties: Coryell, Bell

Highway system
- Interstate Highway System; Main; Auxiliary; Suffixed; Business; Future; Highways in Texas; Interstate; US; State; Former; Toll; Loops; Spurs; FM/RM; Park; Rec
← PR 13	→ SH 14
← SH 213	I-214	→ SH 214

Interstate 14 (I-14 (Note: Some sources use "IH-14", as "IH" is an abbreviation used by TxDOT for Interstate Highways.)), also known as the 14th Amendment Highway, the Gulf Coast Strategic Highway, and the Central Texas Corridor, is an Interstate Highway that is located entirely in Central Texas, following US Highway 190 (US 190). The portion of the route that has been constructed and signed to date, the Central Texas Corridor along US 190 west of I-35 was officially designated as I-14 by the Fixing America's Surface Transportation Act (FAST Act), signed by President Barack Obama on December 14, 2015.

The proposal for the "14th Amendment Highway" has its origins in the 2005 transportation bill, the Safe, Accountable, Flexible, Efficient Transportation Equity Act: A Legacy for Users (SAFETEA-LU). The route was initially planned to have a western terminus at Natchez, Mississippi (later from I-49 near Alexandria, Louisiana), extending east through Louisiana, Mississippi, and Alabama, before ending at Augusta, Georgia, or North Augusta, South Carolina. Advocates of the Gulf Coast Strategic Highway subsequently proposed extending I-14 to I-10 near Fort Stockton and the junction of US 277 and I-10 near Sonora, Texas. The study and planning of I-14 has continued because of support and interest from both Congress and the associated state highway departments. The I-14 corridor, if ultimately constructed, would provide a national strategic link to numerous major military bases and major Gulf and Atlantic coasts ports used for overseas deployments in six states from Texas to South Carolina.

On November 15, 2021, President Joe Biden signed the Infrastructure Investment and Jobs Act (IIJA), which designated the components of the Gulf Coast Strategic Highway corridor between Brady, Texas (including forks to I-20 in Midland and I-10 in Pecos County, Texas), and Augusta, Georgia, as High Priority Corridors of the National Highway System, forming a future extension of I-14.

== Route description ==
I-14 currently begins just east of Copperas Cove at the US 190 and Business US 190 interchange. From there, it continues eastward concurrently with US 190 for just over 25 miles (40 km) before terminating at I-35 in Belton. Between the termini, I-14/US 190 passes through the western part of the Killeen–Temple–Fort Hood metropolitan area, passing just south of Fort Hood and through Killeen as well as Harker Heights and Nolanville. It currently has 25 interchanges (including at its termini), including State Highway 201 (SH 201) in Fort Hood, SH 195 in Killeen, and Loop 121 in Belton. It runs concurrently with US 190, and its exit numbers are based on that highway's mileage.

== History ==
The highway was proposed in 2005 as the "14th Amendment Highway" without an official Interstate Highway designation, with a western terminus at Natchez, Mississippi, extending east through the states of Mississippi and Alabama, before ending at Augusta, Georgia. The highway was named in honor of the Fourteenth Amendment, as the route would traverse the southern "Black Belt" region that formed the heart of the slave-based plantation economy of the 19th century.

US Representative Charlie Norwood of Georgia suggested the highway could be extended to Austin, Texas, in the west and Grand Strand, South Carolina, in the east. SAFETEA-LU was signed into law by President George W. Bush on August 10, 2005. Congressional advocacy for the legislation spiked following the post-Hurricane Katrina logistics controversies. The act included the 14th Amendment Highway and the 3rd Infantry Division Highway (I-3). The legislation did not provide funding for either highway. The Federal Highway Administration (FHWA) has no funding identified beyond the Phase II studies to support long-range planning, environmental review, or construction which must be initiated at the state or regional level with any further direction from Congress. The western terminus was later changed to I-49 near Alexandria, Louisiana.

The 14th Amendment Highway and the Gulf Coast Strategic Highway concepts continued through active studies to the present as local and state interest began to surface and support in Congress, the FHWA, and, most importantly, in the associated state highway departments, all the key ingredients necessary to successfully justify funding any proposed federal-aid highway project. The FHWA issued its report on the 14th Amendment Highway to Congress in 2011 and made recommendation for further environmental and feasibility substudies; however, little action to fund these studies advanced in Congress after 2011. The Texas Department of Transportation (TxDOT) also conducted the US 190/IH-10 Feasibility Study in 2011, which concluded that it was justified to upgrade US 190 to a divided four-lane arterial highway based on traffic projections to 2040, but that upgrading US 190 to a full freeway through Texas was only justified if the 14th Amendment Highway is actually constructed from Louisiana to Georgia.

The I-14 concept became a reality when House Committee on Transportation and Infrastructure members Brian Babin and Blake Farenthold authored and introduced the amendment to the 2015 FAST Act that created I-14 that generally follows US 190 in Texas. US Senator John Cornyn of Texas sponsored the amendment in the US Senate. The official Future I-14 designation was approved when the FAST Act was signed into law on December 4, 2015, by then President Barack Obama.

TxDOT moved forward with designating I-14 along US 190 from Copperas Cove to I-35 in Belton. The American Association of State Highway and Transportation Officials (AASHTO) originally denied approval of TxDOT's request for the number at their May 24, 2016, meeting of the Special Committee on US Route Numbering, the body responsible for approving designations in the US Numbered and Interstate highway systems. The FHWA and AASHTO subsequently approved the I-14 designation. The Texas Transportation Commission made the I-14 number official on January 26, 2017. The official signage ceremony was held April 22, 2017, in Killeen, Texas, on the Central Texas College campus. More I-14 signs went up over the next few weeks.

On April 11, 2019, US Representative Babin introduced the I-14 'Forts-to-Ports' bill—which could extend I-14 to Odessa—to the US House of Representatives.

In August 2021, senators Ted Cruz of Texas and Raphael Warnock of Georgia introduced an amendment to the American Jobs Plan that would designate a corridor of I-14 to connect their respective states. The Interstate as envisioned would reach from the Midland–Odessa, Texas, metropolitan area in the west to Augusta, Georgia, in the east. The bipartisan legislation aims to connect multiple military installations, including Fort Hood in Killeen, Texas (already connected); Goodfellow Air Force Base in San Angelo, Texas; Fort Polk in Leesville, Louisiana; Louisiana National Guard Training Center Pineville (previously Camp Beauregard) in Pineville, Louisiana; Fort Benning in Columbus, Georgia; Robins Air Force Base in Warner Robins, Georgia; and Fort Gordon west of Augusta, Georgia. This amendment was included in the final bill approved by the House and Senate and signed by President Joe Biden on November 15, 2021.

== Future ==
=== Existing route ===
Prior to being designated as I-14, US 190 was expanded from four to six lanes in Killeen, Texas, during a widening project that lasted from 2013 to late 2016. The project was estimated to be completed in 2014 but was delayed by other road expansion projects. Plans to widen the existing route through Harker Heights to the I-35 intersection in Belton from four lanes to six lanes began in April 2018 and was completed in June 2023. A $140,000 project to put up two new welcome signs in Nolanville was started in May 2023. The two-lane expressway bypass of Copperas Cove opened on January 29, 2015.

=== Proposed extension ===
The IIJA designates an extended future I-14 corridor that would encompass the original "14th Amendment Highway" and "Gulf Coast Strategic Highway" concepts, including the following designated High Priority Corridors:

- High Priority Corridor 84, the Central Texas Corridor, including:
  - 84(A): Commencing near State Highway Loop 338 (Loop 338) in Odessa, running eastward generally following I-20, connecting to State Highway 158 (SH 158) near Midland, then following SH 158 eastward before following US 87 southeastward, passing San Angelo, and connecting to US 190 near Brady. This northern fork has been designated "I-14 North" (I-14N).
  - 84(B): Commencing at the intersection of I-10 and US 190 in Pecos County, following US 190 to Brady. This southern fork has been designated "I-14 South" (I-14S).
  - 84(C): Following portions of US 190 eastward, passing near the central Texas cities of Fort Hood, Killeen, Belton, Temple, Bryan, College Station, Huntsville, Livingston, Woodville, and Jasper before connecting to SH 63 at the Burr's Ferry Bridge where it becomes Louisiana Highway 8 (LA 8) at the Louisiana border. I-14 will be concurrent with I-45 between Madisonville and Huntsville. This route also includes a loop generally encircling Bryan–College Station designated "I-214". This is currently the only part of the high-priority corridors to include a completed section of I-14.
  - 84(D): A new interstate (route number to be determined) following US 83 southward from the vicinity of Eden to I-10 at Junction.
  - 84(E): A new interstate (route number to be determined) following US 69 from I-10 in Beaumont north to US 190 near Woodville.
  - 84(F): A new interstate (route number to be determined) following US 96 from I-10 in Beaumont north to US 190 near Jasper.
  - 84(G): A new interstate (route number to be determined) following US 190, Farm to Market Road 305 (FM 305), and US 385 from I-10 in Pecos County to I-20 at Odessa.
- High Priority Corridor 99, the Central Louisiana Corridor, commencing at the Sabine River bridge where SH 63 becomes LA 8 before following portions of LA 8 to Leesville, then eastward on LA 28, passing near Alexandria, Pineville, Walters, and Archie, to US 84 and US 425 at the Natchez–Vidalia Bridge at Vidalia.
- High Priority Corridor 100, the Central Mississippi Corridor, including:
  - 100(A): Commencing at the Natchez–Vidalia Bridge at the Mississippi River and then generally following portions of US 84 passing in the vicinity of Natchez, Brookhaven, Monticello, Prentiss, and Collins, to I-59 near Laurel, and continuing on I-59 north to I-20 before joining I-59 and I-20 to the Alabama state line.
  - 100(B): Commencing near Laurel, running south on I-59 to US 98 near Hattiesburg, connecting to US 49 south then following US 49 south to I-10 in the vicinity of Gulfport and following Mississippi Highway 601 (MS 601)/I-310 south until the Mississippi State Port at Gulfport. The corridor overlaps parts of High Priority Corridors 93 (the South Mississippi Corridor) and 94 (the Kosciusko to Gulf Coast corridor).
- High Priority Corridor 101, the Middle Alabama Corridor, including:
  - 101(A): Beginning at the Alabama–Mississippi border generally following portions of I-20/I-59 until following a new Interstate extension paralleling US 80.
  - 101(B): Crossing State Route 28 (SR 28) near Coatopa, traveling eastward crossing US 43 and SR 69 near Demopolis, traveling eastward closely paralleling US 80 to the south before crossing SR 22, SR 41, and SR 21, until its intersection with I-65 near Hope Hull.
  - 101(C): Continuing east along the proposed Montgomery Outer Loop (I-85) south of Montgomery, where it would next join with I-85 east of Montgomery.
  - 101(D): Continuing along I-85 east bound until its intersection with US 280 near Opelika or US 80 near Tuskegee.
  - 101(E): Generally following the most expedient route until intersecting with existing US 80 (J. R. Allen Parkway) through Phenix City until continuing into Columbus, Georgia.
- High Priority Corridor 102, the Middle Georgia Corridor, including:
  - 102(A): Beginning at the Alabama–Georgia state line generally following the Fall Line Freeway from Columbus to Augusta.
  - 102(B): Traveling along US 80 (J. R. Allen Parkway) through Columbus and near Fort Benning east to Talbot County, where it would follow State Route 96 (SR 96), then commencing on SR 49C (Fort Valley Bypass) to SR 49 (Peach Parkway) to its intersection with I-75 in Byron.
  - 102(C): Continuing north along I-75 through Warner Robins and Macon, where it would meet I-16, then following I-16 east it would next join US 80 and SR 57 east of Macon.
  - 102(D): Commencing with SR 57 which turns into SR 24 near Milledgeville would then bypass Wrens with a newly constructed bypass before joining US 1 near Fort Gordon into Augusta, where I-14 will terminate at an interchange of I-20 and I-520.

=== Current progress ===
==== Texas ====
TxDOT is in the planning stages of construction on the rest of the route in the state and started requesting public feedback in July 2023 to identify issues and opportunities along the proposed route. Work on I-14N and I-14S in the Permian Basin is expected to require approximately 260 roadway projects, which includes 32 bridges, two interchanges, 89 miles (143 km) of added capacity, 136 miles (219 km) rehabilitated or maintained, and 66 miles (106 km) of new pavement. Planning for this is currently ongoing and expected to end in February 2024 with the design and work on the system expected to continue for at least a decade. TxDOT's feasibility study on the rest of I-14 started in the Fall of 2021 and is expected to take seven years to complete. Construction in the Bryan–College Station metropolitan area is not expected to begin for another 15–20 years based on information provided by the Bryan/College Station Metropolitan Planning Organization in 2022. Various public meetings are planned to be held.

Construction on an extension of I-14 to Temple is expected to begin in 2027 while a bypass is currently being built around Rogers. A non-Interstate standard bypass was also built around Heidenheimer in the late 2000s. In July 2023, the Parsons Corporation (PSN) announced that it had been selected by TXDOT's Waco District to design the I-14 extension to Rogers as well as improve I-14/US 190/I-35 system interchange. A public meeting to discuss these plans was held in early-June 2024.

On October 10, 2023, the Bryan division of TXDOT announced that they were launching a study for the I-14 corridor, which will generally follow US 190, from Rogers in Bell County eastward to Huntsville in Walker County. The study will also include the planned I-214 loop in the Bryan-College Station area. Several open houses for public input were announced as well. Public feedback was also requested by the Brazos County commissioner in November 2023. Public meetings were also held or are going to be held across the Brazos Valley in June and July 2024. A loop around Huntsville is also being planned.

In March 2024, TxDOT released an implementation plan that listed all the projects that were planned for the I-14 project in the state.

Currently, TxDOT and the Louisiana Department of Transportation and Development (LaDOTD) are working to replace the two-lane Burr's Ferry Bridge, which marks the eastern and western termini of Texas State Highway 63 (SH 63) and Louisiana Highway 8 (LA 8) respectively, over the Sabine River at the Texas-Louisiana state line. The new bridge will be built to interstate-highway standards about a quarter mile to the south of the existing bridge. The construction of the replacement bridge is expected to start in summer 2025.

In February 2026, construction to widen the existing bypass of Copperas Cove to four lanes began. Construction is slated for completion in early 2029.

==== Louisiana ====
LaDOTD has included I-14 in the state's transportation plan, with the project as a whole estimated to cost $7 billion. The interstate has been seen as a way to spur growth in the currently declining populations across central Louisiana by providing a major east–west highway through the region. However, the project is unfunded and LaDOTD has made maintaining existing infrastructure a top priority for the time being as they also have a backlog of projects worth more than $18 billion.

==== Georgia ====
In May 2023, the Columbus city council announced that they had begun the process of collecting data and looking into the project that would bring I-14 through the city.

In January 2024, the Georgia Department of Transportation (GDOT) concluded a study that deemed that the I-14 project would not have a good return on investment. The report indicated that truck traffic on the route would be significantly less than on other interstates in the state, making it less beneficial since the initial cost estimate for building the freeway is around $5 billion. However, the study was only referring to moving freight through the state and it did not completely rule out building I-14 since some benefits were found. GDOT plans to run corridor studies for the project to further evaluate its feasibility and cost.

== Exit list ==
Exit numbers follow US 190's mile markers.

County	Location	mi	km	Exit	Destinations	Notes
Coryell	Copperas Cove	0.00	0.00		US 190 west – Lampasas	Continuation beyond western terminus
Coryell	Copperas Cove	0.00	0.00	276	Bus. US 190 west / SH 9 west – Copperas Cove	Temporary western terminus
Coryell	Fort Hood	0.4	0.64	277	Clarke Road	
Coryell–Bell county line	Fort Hood	1.8	2.9	278	Bell Tower Drive	
Coryell–Bell county line	Fort Hood	2.3	3.7	280A	SH 201 south (Clear Creek Road)	
Bell	Fort Hood	3.1	5.0	280B	Clear Creek Road north	Westbound access via exit 280A
Bell	Killeen	4.1	6.6	281	Bus. US 190 east / T.J. Mills Boulevard	
Bell	Killeen	4.8	7.7	282	Willow Springs Road	
Bell	Killeen	5.3	8.5	283	SH 195 (Fort Hood Street)	
Bell	Killeen	7.2	11.6	284	Trimmier Road	
Bell	Killeen	7.8	12.6	285	W.S. Young Drive	
Bell	Killeen	8.8	14.2	286	FM 3470 (Stan Schlueter Loop)	No direct westbound exit (Signed at exit 287)
Bell	Killeen	10.1	16.3	287	Rosewood Drive	
Bell	Harker Heights	10.8	17.4	288	FM 2410 (Knight's Way)	
Bell	Harker Heights	12.0	19.3	289	FM 3423 (Indian Trail)	
Bell	Harker Heights	13.3	21.4	290	Bus. US 190 west / Nola Ruth Boulevard	No westbound entrance
Bell	Nolanville	15.4	24.8	292	FM Spur 439 (Main Street) – Nolanville	
Bell	Nolanville	16.6	26.7	293	Paddy Hamilton Road	
Bell		18.4	29.6	295	Frontage Road	No eastbound entrance
Bell		19.1	30.7	296	FM 2410 (Simmons Road)	
Bell		20.2	32.5	297	George Wilson Road	
Bell	Belton	21.8	35.1	299	FM 1670 (Stillhouse Hollow Dam Road)	
Bell	Belton	23.1	37.2	300	Loop 121	
Bell	Belton	23.9	38.5	301	I-35 south / SH 317 (Main Street) / FM 436 (Holland Road) / Connell Street	Eastbound exit and entrance; I-35 exit 293B northbound
Bell	Belton	24.8	39.9	302	I-35 north	Temporary eastern terminus; western end of I-35 concurrency; I-35 exit 293A
Bell	Belton	See Interstate 35 (exits-293B-297)				
Bell	Temple			307A	I-35 south / Loop 363 west	Future eastern end of I-35 concurrency; future western end of Loop 363 concurrency; I-35 exit 299
Bell	Temple			307B	57th Street, Oakdale Drive	No future eastbound exit
Bell	Temple			308	FM 1741 (31st Street)	
Bell	Temple			309	5th Street	
Bell	Temple			310	Spur 290 east (1st Street)	
Bell	Temple			311	Loop 363 north to I-35 north – Waco SH 95 south – Taylor	Future eastern end of Loop 363 concurrency
Bell	Heidenheimer			313	Bus. US 190 east – Cameron	
Bell	Heidenheimer			314	FM 93 / FM 436 – Belton, Little River-Academy	
1.000 mi = 1.609 km; 1.000 km = 0.621 mi: Concurrency terminus; Incomplete access; Unopened

== Auxiliary routes ==
=== Interstate 14N ===
Future Interstate 14N
- Location: Odessa–Brady

Interstate 14N (I-14N) will run from a western terminus near State Highway Loop 338 (Loop 338) in Odessa, running eastward generally following I-20, connecting to State Highway 158 (SH 158) near Midland, then following SH 158 eastward before following US 87 southeastward, passing San Angelo, and connecting to US 190 and I-14S at its eastern terminus near Brady.

=== Interstate 14S ===
Future Interstate 14S
- Location: Pecos County–Brady

Interstate 14S (I-14S) will run from a western terminus at the interchange of I-10 and US 190 in Pecos County, following US 190 and connecting with I-14N at its eastern terminus near Brady.

=== Interstate 214 ===
Future Interstate 214
- Location: Bryan–College Station

I-14 in Texas is proposed to have one auxiliary route, Interstate 214 (I-214), which is proposed to be a beltway around Bryan–College Station.

== See also ==
- Fall Line Freeway, a highway proposed to be the Georgia portion of I-14
