= List of Farm to Market Roads in Texas (3400–3499) =

- Texas Farm to Market Road and Ranch to Market Road markers

Highway names
- Interstates: Interstate Highway X (IH-X, I-X)
- US Highways: U.S. Highway X (US X)
- State: State Highway X (SH X)
- Loops: Loop X
- Spurs: Spur X
- Recreational: Recreational Road X (RE X)
- Farm or Ranch to Market Roads: Farm to Market Road X (FM X); Ranch to Market Road X (RM X)
- Park Roads: Park Road X (PR X)

System links
- Highways in Texas; Interstate; US; State; Former; Toll; Loops; Spurs; FM/RM; Park; Rec

Farm to Market Roads in Texas are owned and maintained by the Texas Department of Transportation (TxDOT).

== FM 3400 ==
Farm to Market Road 3400
- Location: McLennan County
- Length: 5.349 mi (8.608 km)
- Existed: 1977–present

Farm to Market Road 3400 (FM 3400) is located in McLennan County.

FM 3400 begins at an intersection with FM 434 in Robinson. The highway travels north along University Parks Drive through more rural areas of the county and enters Waco near SH 6/Loop 340 before ending at another intersection with FM 434. FM 3400 serves a through-fare for FM 434 as FM 434 is discontinuous at the SH 6/Loop 340 freeway.

FM 3400 was designated on September 29, 1977, along the current route. On June 27, 1995, the entire route was redesignated Urban Road 3400 (UR 3400). The designation reverted to FM 3400 with the elimination of the Urban Road system on November 15, 2018.

Junction list

The entire route is in McLennan County.

Location	mi	km	Destinations	Notes
	0.0	0.0	FM 434 – Downsville, Asa	
Waco	4.9	7.9	SH 6 / Loop 340	Interchange; access to Baylor Scott & White Medical Center – Hillcrest
Waco	5.4	8.7	FM 434	
1.000 mi = 1.609 km; 1.000 km = 0.621 mi

== FM 3401 ==
Farm to Market Road 3401
- Location: Limestone County
- Length: 0.304 mi (489 m)
- Existed: 1977–present

Farm to Market Road 3401 (FM 3401) is located in Groesbeck in Limestone County. It is approximately 0.3 miles (0.5 km) long.

The highway's southern terminus is at SH 14 (South Ellis Street) near Groesbeck Elementary and Middle Schools. FM 3401 runs northwest along Elwood Enge Drive before ending at FM 2489 (Big Hill Road).

FM 3401 was designated on September 29, 1977, on its current route.

== FM 3402 ==
Farm to Market Road 3402
- Location: DeWitt County
- Length: 3.8 mi (6.1 km)
- Existed: September 29, 1977–June 3, 1994

Farm to Market Road 3402 (FM 3402) was located in DeWitt County. No highway currently uses the FM 3402 designation.

FM 3402 was designated on September 29, 1977, from US 87 in Cuero to a point 2.3 miles (3.7 km) west. On October 26, 1983, the road was extended west 1.5 miles (2.4 km) to US 87. FM 3402 was cancelled by district request on June 3, 1994, and became a portion of SH 72.

== FM 3403 ==
Farm to Market Road 3403
- Location: Lee County
- Length: 5.790 mi (9.318 km)
- Existed: 1977–present

Farm to Market Road 3403 (FM 3403) begins at an intersection with US 77 approximately 4 miles north of TX-21. It then runs generally southeast for 5.8 miles before terminating at an intersection with TX-21. In 1978, one year after its designation, it was extended 3.1 miles to TX-21.

== RM 3404 ==
Ranch to Market Road 3404
- Location: Llano County
- Length: 1.550 mi (2.494 km)
- Existed: 1977–present

Ranch to Market Road 3404 (RM 3404) runs from RM 1431 in Kingsland west 1.550 miles (2.494 km). State maintenance ends at the crossing with the Llano River where the road continues as County Road 307.

== FM 3405 ==
Farm to Market Road 3405
- Location: Williamson County
- Length: 7.561 mi (12.168 km)
- Existed: 1977–present

Farm to Market Road 3405 (FM 3405) is a 7.5-mile (12.1 km) route in Williamson County.

It begins at US 183 north of Liberty Hill. The route travels to the east, and the north fork of the San Gabriel River lies to its south. The highway ends at RM 2338 northwest of the city of Georgetown and Lake Georgetown.

FM 3405 was designated along its current route on September 29, 1977.

== FM 3406 ==
Farm to Market Road 3406
- Location: Williamson County
- Length: 2.167 mi (3.487 km)
- Existed: September 29, 1977–March 26, 2020

Farm to Market Road 3406 (FM 3406) was located in Williamson County. It ran from I-35, north of Round Rock to a point 2.1 miles (3.4 km) south and west.

FM 3406 was designated on September 29, 1977, from I-35 north of Round Rock to a point 1.1 miles (1.8 km) southwest. On August 20, 1980, the road was extended 1.0 mile (1.6 km) west.

FM 3406 was cancelled on March 26, 2020, and the road was given to the city of Round Rock.

== FM 3407 ==
Farm to Market Road 3407
- Location: Hays County
- Length: 1.912 mi (3.077 km)
- Existed: September 29, 1977–June 24, 2010

Farm to Market Road 3407 (FM 3407) was located in Hays County. It was designated on September 29, 1977, and ran along Wonder World Drive in San Marcos from FM 2439, 1.6 miles (2.6 km) southwest of RM 12, southeast 1.8 miles (2.9 km) to SH 123 south of the city. Upon its extension to RM 12 on June 24, 2010, FM 3407 was cancelled and redesignated as part of RM 12.

== FM 3408 ==
Farm to Market Road 3408
- Location: La Salle County
- Length: 3.929 mi (6.323 km)
- Existed: 1977–present

Farm to Market Road 3408 (FM 3408) begins at I-35 2 miles south of Cotulla and runs southeast. After approximately 3.9 miles, state maintenance ends and the road continues, unpaved, as Allerkamp Road, eventually leading to Holland Dam Park and then continuing to FM 624 as Holland Dam Road. It was relocated in 1979 on the request of local authorities, formerly running from FM 624 southwestward.

== FM 3409 ==
Farm to Market Road 3409
- Location: San Augustine County
- Length: 2.282 mi (3.673 km)
- Existed: October 21, 1981–present

Farm to Market Road 3409 (FM 3409) begins at TX-21 1.4 miles east of Denning and runs south then southwest 2.282 miles (3.673 km), terminating at a four-way junction with County Road 259. It continues as partially paved Brushy Road (CR 272/336), eventually ending at FM 1277.

=== FM 3409 (1977) ===
Farm to Market Road 3409
- Location: Aransas County
- Existed: September 29, 1977–March 19, 1980

A previous route numbered FM 3409 was designated on September 29, 1977, from SH 35 in Rockport, 0.8 miles (1.3 km) southwest of FM 881, to a point 1.8 miles (2.9 km) north. FM 3409 was cancelled on March 19, 1980, at the request of officials of Aransas County and Rockport.

== FM 3410 ==
Farm to Market Road 3410
- Location: Goliad County
- Length: 1.023 mi (1.646 km)
- Existed: 1977–present

Farm to Market Road 3410 (FM 3410) begins at FM 2441 approximately a quarter mile north of Blanco Creek and runs east 1.023 miles (1.646 km). It continues as McGuill Road, running east-northeast 4.5 miles until it intersects with U.S. 183 and US 77 Alternate.

== FM 3411 ==
Farm to Market Road 3411
- Location: Walker County
- Length: 2.325 mi (3.742 km)
- Existed: 1977–present

Farm to Market Road 3411 (FM 3411) runs from SH 19 (former Loop 405) east to FM 2929.

== FM 3412 ==
Farm to Market Road 3412
- Location: Collin County
- Length: 2.107 mi (3.391 km)
- Existed: September 29, 1977–May 28, 2009

Farm to Market Road 3412 (FM 3412) was located in Collin County, wholly within the city limits of Wylie. It ran about 1.8 miles (2.9 km) from FM 1378 northwest of the city to FM 2514 near downtown.

FM 3412 began at an intersection with FM 1378 in Wylie, heading east on two-lane undivided West Brown Street. The road headed through a mix of fields and woods with some commercial development. Farther east, the highway headed into residential areas with some businesses. FM 3412 crossed a Kansas City Southern railroad line before ending at FM 2514.

FM 3412 was designated on September 29, 1977, to run from FM 544 near Murphy east to SH 78 in Wylie. On January 9, 1978, the two highways switched alignments, with FM 3412 running from FM 1378 east to SH 78 in Wylie. FM 3412 was redesignated Urban Road 3412 (UR 3412) on June 27, 1995. The section of FM 3412 from FM 1378 to FM 2514 was cancelled on November 20, 2008. The remainder of the route was transferred to FM 2514 on May 28, 2009.

== FM 3413 ==
Farm to Market Road 3413
- Location: Ellis County
- Length: 0.209 mi (336 m)
- Existed: 1977–present

Farm to Market Road 3413 (FM 3413) begins at I-45 south of Ennis and continues northeast to FM 85.

== FM 3414 ==
Farm to Market Road 3414
- Location: Jasper County
- Length: 3.157 mi (5.081 km)
- Existed: September 29, 1977–present

Farm to Market Road 3414 (FM 3414) begins at FM 2800 at Westlake and runs 3.157 miles south to a junction with TX-63 and FM 2799. North of FM 2800, the road continues as a partially paved Read Road (County Road 120).

== FM 3415 ==
Farm to Market Road 3415
- Location: Lampasas County
- Length: 3.740 mi (6.019 km)
- Existed: September 29, 1977–present

Farm to Market Road 3415 (FM 3415) begins at US 183 south of Lometa and runs south, west, and south 3.740 miles (6.019 km).

== FM 3416 ==
Farm to Market Road 3416
- Location: King County
- Length: 3.006 mi (4.838 km)
- Existed: September 29, 1977–present

Farm to Market Road 3416 (FM 3416) begins at FM 1168 east of US 83 and runs east 3.006 miles (4.838 km).

== FM 3417 ==
Farm to Market Road 3417
- Location: Titus County
- Length: 4.268 mi (6.869 km)
- Existed: September 29, 1977–present

Farm to Market Road 3417 (FM 3417) begins at US 271 north of Big Cypress Creek and runs west and north to FM 127.

== FM 3418 ==
Farm to Market Road 3418
- Location: Stephens County
- Length: 4.131 mi (6.648 km)
- Existed: October 21, 1981–present

Farm to Market Road 3418 (FM 3418) begins at FM 2231 southwest of Breckenridge and continues south to FM 576.

== FM 3419 ==
Farm to Market Road 3419
- Location: Bowie County
- Length: 1.071 mi (1.724 km)
- Existed: September 26, 1979–present

Farm to Market Road 3419 (FM 3419) begins at FM 2148 in Red Lick and continues south to US 82.

== FM 3420 ==
Farm to Market Road 3420
- Location: Hidalgo County
- Existed: September 26, 1979–December 22, 1997

Farm to Market Road 3420 (FM 3420) was located in Hidalgo County. No highway currently uses the FM 3420 designation.

FM 3420 was designated on September 26, 1979, from an intersection with SH 107 0.5 miles (0.80 km) east of FM 2061 to a point 1.8 miles (2.9 km) south. On August 29, 1989, the road was extended south 1.6 miles (2.6 km) to FM 3362. On June 27, 1995, the entire route was transferred to Urban Road 3420 (UR 3420). The route was cancelled on December 22, 1997, by district request, and its mileage was transferred to FM 3362.

== FM 3421 ==
Farm to Market Road 3421
- Location: Morris County
- Length: 2.472 mi (3.978 km)
- Existed: October 21, 1981–present

Farm to Market Road 3421 (FM 3421) begins at US 259 north of Lone Star and runs southeast to FM 250.

== FM 3422 ==
Farm to Market Road 3422
- Location: Hartley County
- Length: 4.335 mi (6.977 km)
- Existed: October 21, 1981–present

Farm to Market Road 3422 (FM 3422) begins at FM 807 north of Hartley and runs east 4.335 miles (6.977 km).

== FM 3423 ==
Farm to Market Road 3423
- Location: Bell County
- Length: 0.784 mi (1,262 m)
- Existed: October 21, 1981–present

Farm to Market Road 3423 (FM 3423) is located in Bell County in the town of Harker Heights. The highway is known locally as Indian Trail.

FM 3423 begins at a junction with I-14 / US 190 near a retail center. North of Clore Road, the highway travels through a less developed area of the town before ending at an intersection with Bus. US 190.

FM 3423 was designated on October 21, 1981, along its current route. On June 27, 1995, the entire route was redesignated Urban Road 3423 (UR 3423). The designation reverted to FM 3423 with the elimination of the Urban Road system on November 15, 2018.

== FM 3424 ==
Farm to Market Road 3424
- Location: Comal County
- Length: 1.359 mi (2.187 km)
- Existed: October 21, 1981–present

Farm to Market Road 3424 (FM 3424) is located in Comal County. It runs 1.4 miles (2.3 km) from FM 306 near the north shore of Canyon Lake northward to RM 32.

FM 3424 was designed on October 21, 1981, along the current route.

== FM 3425 ==
Farm to Market Road 3425
- Location: Coleman County
- Length: 1.437 mi (2.313 km)
- Existed: October 1, 1981–present

Farm to Market Road 3425 (FM 3425) begins at US 84 in Coleman and runs northeast to SH 206.

== FM 3426 ==
Farm to Market Road 3426
- Location: Lamar County
- Length: 3.522 mi (5.668 km)
- Existed: October 21, 1981–present

Farm to Market Road 3426 (FM 3426) begins at FM 1497 in Biardstown and continues east to FM 905.

== FM 3427 ==
Farm to Market Road 3427
- Location: Hunt County
- Length: 4.551 mi (7.324 km)
- Existed: October 21, 1981–present

Farm to Market Road 3427 (FM 3427) begins at US 69 in Kingston and runs east to SH 34.

== FM 3428 ==
Farm to Market Road 3428
- Location: Montague County
- Length: 2.489 mi (4.006 km)
- Existed: October 21, 1981–present

Farm to Market Road 3428 (FM 3428) is located in Montague County to FM 2634. It begins at an intersection with Gilbert Road west of Lake Nocona, where the road heads south as Keck Reynolds Road. From this intersection, the highway heads north to an intersection with FM 1106, which heads east to provide access to Lake Nocona, before ending at a junction with FM 2634. North of this intersection, the road continues north as Carpenter Road.

FM 3428 was designated on October 21, 1981, along the current route.

== FM 3429 ==
Farm to Market Road 3429
- Location: Wichita County
- Length: 1.348 mi (2.169 km)
- Existed: October 21, 1981–present

Farm to Market Road 3429 (FM 3429) begins at US 277 at the south edge of Burkburnett and runs west and north to near Preston Rd.

== FM 3430 ==
Farm to Market Road 3430
- Location: Wilbarger County
- Length: 1.508 mi (2.427 km)
- Existed: October 21, 1981–present

Farm to Market Road 3430 (FM 3430) begins at FM 433 west of Oklaunion and runs south 1.508 miles (2.427 km).

== FM 3431 ==
Farm to Market Road 3431
- Location: Lubbock County
- Length: 3.003 mi (4.833 km)
- Existed: October 27, 1994–present

Farm to Market Road 3431 (FM 3431) is located in Lubbock County.

FM 3431 begins at an intersection with FM 1585 near a winery. The highway travels north through a mostly rural area of the county just outside of Lubbock. FM 3431 enters the Lubbock city limits and ends at an intersection with US 84 near the Montford Unit.

FM 3431 was designated on October 27, 1994, along the current route.

=== FM 3431 (1981) ===
Farm to Market Road 3431
- Location: Stonewall County
- Existed: October 21, 1981–October 7, 1987

FM 3431 was first designated on October 21, 1981, running from FM 1263 near Aspermont eastward to the Salt Fork Brazos River at a distance of approximately 5.0 miles (8.0 km). Another section from Sandlin Community east 2.5 miles (4.0 km) to FM 1835 was designated on October 23, 1983, creating a gap. FM 3431 was cancelled on October 7, 1987, with the mileage being transferred to FM 1835.

== FM 3432 ==
Farm to Market Road 3432
- Location: Bexar and Wilson counties
- Length: 8.310 mi (13.374 km)
- Existed: October 21, 1981–present

Farm to Market Road 3432 (FM 3432) begins at FM 1628 on new Sulphur Springs Road and continues southeast to the junction of FM 775.

== FM 3433 ==
Farm to Market Road 3433
- Location: Wise County
- Length: 3.083 mi (4.962 km)
- Existed: October 21, 1981–present

Farm to Market Road 3433 (FM 3433) begins at US 81 at the south edge of Rhome and continues south to FM 718 at Newark.

== FM 3434 ==
Farm to Market Road 3434
- Location: McLennan County
- Length: 2.944 mi (4.738 km)
- Existed: October 21, 1981–present

Farm to Market Road 3434 (FM 3434) begins at FM 1637 near Madison Cooper Airfield and runs northwest to a county road intersection.

== FM 3435 ==
Farm to Market Road 3435
- Location: Lavaca County
- Length: 0.937 mi (1,508 m)
- Existed: October 21, 1981–present

Farm to Market Road 3435 (FM 3435) begins at US 90A northwest of SH 95 in Shiner and runs west to SH 95.

== FM 3436 ==
Farm to Market Road 3436
- Location: Galveston County
- Length: 1.597 mi (2.570 km)
- Existed: January 28, 1982–present

Farm to Market Road 3436 (FM 3436) is located in Galveston County. It runs from FM 517 in Texas City to FM 646 (future SH 99) near Bacliff.

FM 3436 was designated on January 28, 1982, from FM 517 and Avenue B in San Leon south to FM 517 in Texas City as a replacement of a section of FM 517. On July 20, 1982, a 5.9 mile section from FM 517 in Texas City to FM 646 near Bacliff was transferred to FM 646. On June 30, 1995, the entire route was transferred to UR 3436, but was changed back to FM 3436 on November 15, 2018.

== FM 3437 ==
Farm to Market Road 3437
- Location: Limestone County
- Length: 1.080 mi (1.738 km)
- Existed: February 17, 1982–present

Farm to Market Road 3437 (FM 3437) begins at FM 2681 near Lake Mexia and runs west to Booker T. Washington Park.

== FM 3438 ==
Farm to Market Road 3438
- Location: Taylor County
- Length: 5.057 mi (8.138 km)
- Existed: September 22, 1982–present

Farm to Market Road 3438 (FM 3438) is located on the west side of Abilene. FM 3438 begins at U.S. Highway 277 (US 277) near the Quail Hollow subdivision and travels to the north and passes to the east of Dyess Air Force Base before ending at I-20. A section of FM 3438 has frontage roads. They are located between Hartford Street to US 84 for the northbound lanes, and between Military Drive and US 84 on the southbound lanes. These frontage roads are a continuation of the frontage roads on eastbound US 84.

FM 3438 was designated on September 22, 1982, from US 277 northward 2.9 miles (4.7 km) to the south end of Spur 312. On August 18, 1987, FM 3438 was extended north 0.8 miles (1.3 km) to Loop 355 (now Business I-20), replacing Spur 312. On August 29, 1989, FM 3438 was extended north to I-20. On June 27, 1995, the section from I-20 to US 277 was redesignated Urban Road 3438 (UR 3438). The designation of this section reverted to FM 3438 with the elimination of the Urban Road system on November 15, 2018.

In 2008, TxDOT began reconstruction of the intersection of FM 3438 and I-20 Bus/US 84, which was converted to an interchange.

Junction list

The entire route is in Abilene, Taylor County.

mi	km	Destinations	Notes
0.0	0.0	US 277 – San Angelo, Anson	Southern terminus; interchange; roadway continues as Rebecca Lane to FM 89
3.6	5.8	I-20 BL / US 84	after 2008: Interchange: before 2008: At-grade intersection
4.9	7.9	I-20 – Sweetwater, Eastland	Northern terminus; I-20 exit 281
1.000 mi = 1.609 km; 1.000 km = 0.621 mi

== FM 3439 ==
Farm to Market Road 3439
- Location: Angelina County
- Length: 0.709 mi (1,141 m)
- Existed: October 22, 1982–present

Farm to Market Road 3439 (FM 3439) begins at Loop 287 in Lufkin and runs north to US 59.

== FM 3440 ==
Farm to Market Road 3440
- Location: Hill County
- Length: 0.360 mi (579 m)
- Existed: January 25, 1983–present

Farm to Market Road 3440 (FM 3440) begins at FM 1947 south of Peoria and runs south to the US Corps of Engineers gate.

== FM 3441 ==
Farm to Market Road 3441
- Location: Henderson County
- Length: 9.182 mi (14.777 km)
- Existed: June 15, 1983–present

Farm to Market Road 3441 (FM 3441) begins at SH 31 in Malakoff and runs south to FM 59 at Cross Roads.

== FM 3442 ==
Farm to Market Road 3442
- Location: Cooke County
- Length: 1.245 mi (2.004 km)
- Existed: October 26, 1983–present

Farm to Market Road 3442 (FM 3442) is located in the southern portion of Cooke County. FM 3442 begins at FM 3002 and travels to the south before ending at the Denton County line, whereupon it continues as a local road for approximately 1/4 mile before ending at another local road.

FM 3442 was designated on October 26, 1983, on its current route.

== FM 3443 ==
Farm to Market Road 3443
- Location: Maverick County
- Length: 1.637 mi (2.634 km)
- Existed: October 26, 1983–present

Farm to Market Road 3443 (FM 3443) begins at the junction of US 57/277 near Eagle Pass and runs southwest to FM 1021.

== FM 3444 ==
Farm to Market Road 3444
- Location: Wilson County
- Existed: October 26, 1983–February 24, 1994

Farm to Market Road 3444 (FM 3444) was located in Wilson County. No highway currently uses the FM 3444 designation.

FM 3444 was designated on October 26, 1983, from US 181 southwest 3.3 miles (5.3 km) to FM 1303 at Canada Verde. On February 24, 1994, FM 3444 was cancelled by district request and transferred to FM 775.

== FM 3445 ==
Farm to Market Road 3445
- Location: McMullen County
- Length: 7.22 mi (11.62 km)
- Existed: October 26, 1983–present

Farm to Market Road 3445 (FM 3445) begins at SH 16 north of Tilden and runs east and northeast 7.22 miles (11.62 km).

== FM 3446 ==
Farm to Market Road 3446
- Location: Collingsworth County
- Length: 3.999 mi (6.436 km)
- Existed: October 26, 1983–present

Farm to Market Road 3446 (FM 3446) begins at US 83 north of Wellington and runs east and south to Panfork Camp.

== FM 3447 ==
Farm to Market Road 3447
- Location: Uvalde County
- Length: 1.295 mi (2.084 km)
- Existed: October 26, 1983–present

Farm to Market Road 3447 (FM 3447) runs from US 90 at the east side of Uvalde north to FM 2369.

== FM 3448 ==
Farm to Market Road 3448
- Location: Sabine County
- Length: 1.765 mi (2.840 km)
- Existed: October 26, 1983–present

Farm to Market Road 3448 (FM 3448) runs from SH 21 west of Geneva north 1.765 miles (2.840 km).

== FM 3449 ==
Farm to Market Road 3449
- Location: Sabine County
- Length: 0.923 mi (1,485 m)
- Existed: October 26, 1983–present

Farm to Market Road 3449 (FM 3449) runs from FM 2928 northeast of SH 87 southeast and east 0.923 mile (1.485 m).

== FM 3450 ==
Farm to Market Road 3450
- Location: Hood County
- Length: 4.07 mi (6.55 km)
- Existed: October 26, 1983–present

Farm to Market Road 3450 (FM 3450) runs from FM 167 east of FM 51 east to SH 171.

== FM 3451 ==
Farm to Market Road 3451
- Location: San Augustine County
- Length: 1.025 mi (1.650 km)
- Existed: November 24, 1986–present

Farm to Market Road 3451 (FM 3451) is located in San Augustine County. It runs from US 96 north of San Augustine eastward 1 mile (1.6 km) to FM 3230.

FM 3451 was designated on November 24, 1986, along the current route.

=== FM 3451 (1983) ===
Farm to Market Road 3451
- Location: Coryell County
- Existed: October 26, 1983–August 29, 1984

A previous route numbered FM 3451 was designated in Coryell County on October 26, 1983, from FM 2412, 1 mile (1.6 km) east of Levita, northward 5.5 miles (8.9 km) to SH 36. The county discontinued the project in December 1983, and the designation was cancelled on August 29, 1984.

== FM 3452 ==
Farm to Market Road 3452
- Location: Anderson County
- Length: 1.283 mi (2.065 km)
- Existed: October 26, 1983–present

Farm to Market Road 3452 (FM 3452) is located in Anderson County. It connects FM 645 to the TDCJ's Beto Unit.

FM 3452 was designated on October 26, 1983, along the current route.

== FM 3453 ==
Farm to Market Road 3453
- Location: Trinity County
- Length: 1.461 mi (2.351 km)
- Existed: October 26, 1983–present

Farm to Market Road 3453 (FM 3453) runs from SH 19 south of Trinity east to a county road.

== FM 3454 ==
Farm to Market Road 3454
- Location: Walker County
- Length: 1.612 mi (2.594 km)
- Existed: October 26, 1983–present

Farm to Market Road 3454 (FM 3454) runs from FM 980, east of SH 19, north 1.612 miles (2.594 km).

== FM 3455 ==
Farm to Market Road 3455
- Location: Grimes County
- Length: 1.46 mi (2.35 km)
- Existed: October 26, 1983–present

Farm to Market Road 3455 (FM 3455) runs from FM 3090, northeast of SH 6 in Navasota, southeast to SH 90.

== FM 3456 ==
Farm to Market Road 3456
- Location: Washington County
- Length: 1.766 mi (2.842 km)
- Existed: October 26, 1983–present

Farm to Market Road 3456 (FM 3456) runs from FM 332, southwest of Brenham, southeast to FM 109.

== FM 3457 ==
Farm to Market Road 3457
- Location: Stonewall County
- Length: 1.081 mi (1.740 km)
- Existed: October 26, 1983–present

Farm to Market Road 3457 (FM 3457) runs from FM 1263 in Aspermont south to US 380.

== FM 3458 ==
Farm to Market Road 3458
- Location: Castro County
- Length: 2.228 mi (3.586 km)
- Existed: October 26, 1983–present

Farm to Market Road 3458 (FM 3458) runs from FM 303 east to a county road intersection in Dodd.

== FM 3459 ==
Farm to Market Road 3459
- Location: Polk County
- Length: 4.968 mi (7.995 km)
- Existed: October 26, 1983–present

Farm to Market Road 3459 (FM 3459) runs from US 190 in Onalaska, northward to the Trinity County Line.

== FM 3460 ==
Farm to Market Road 3460
- Location: San Jacinto County
- Length: 2.286 mi (3.679 km)
- Existed: October 26, 1983–present

Farm to Market Road 3460 (FM 3460) runs from US 59 in Shepherd, southward to FM 2914.

== FM 3461 ==
Farm to Market Road 3461
- Location: Hidalgo County
- Length: 3.671 mi (5.908 km)
- Existed: October 26, 1983–present

Farm to Market Road 3461 (FM 3461) runs from FM 2061 in McAllen, eastward to FM 1426.

== FM 3462 ==
Farm to Market Road 3462
- Location: Cameron County
- Length: 1.527 mi (2.457 km)
- Existed: October 26, 1983–present

Farm to Market Road 3462 (FM 3462) runs in San Benito, from SH 345 southeastward to FM 510.

== FM 3463 ==
Farm to Market Road 3463
- Location: Menard County
- Length: 8.172 mi (13.152 km)
- Existed: February 16, 1984–present

Farm to Market Road 3463 (FM 3463) is located in Menard County. The 8.2-mile (13.2 km) road begins 6 miles (9.7 km) north of Menard at US 83 and travels northwest and west until it turns into a gravel road.

FM 3463 was designated on January 9, 1984, along the current route as a redesignation of a portion of FM 1223 when the middle section of FM 1223 was cancelled.

== FM 3464 ==
Farm to Market Road 3464
- Location: Webb County
- Existed: October 26, 1983–June 29, 2000

Farm to Market Road 3464 (FM 3464) was located in Webb County. No highway currently uses the FM 3464 designation.

FM 3464 was designated on October 26, 1983, from FM 1472, 2.5 miles (4.0 km) northwest of Laredo, east 1.5 miles (2.4 km) to I-35. On April 1, 1988, the road was extended east 2 miles (3.2 km), replacing FM 3488. On June 30, 1995, the entire route was transferred to UR 3464. UR 3464 was cancelled on June 29, 2000: the section from 0.33 miles (0.53 km) west of I-35 west to UR 1472 was returned to Laredo and the remainder of UR 3464 became Loop 20.

== FM 3465 ==
Farm to Market Road 3465
- Location: Bexar County
- Length: 1.375 mi (2.213 km)
- Existed: December 22, 1983–present

Farm to Market Road 3465 (FM 3465) runs from Loop 1604 northward via Lone Oak to Loop 1604. FM 3465 serves as a connecting road between Loop 1604 and US 87. The highway was designated in 1983 along an old section of Loop 1604.

Junction list

The entire route is in Bexar County.

Location	mi	km	Destinations	Notes
	0.0	0.0	Loop 1604 – St. Hedwig, Elmendorf	
	0.5	0.80	US 87 – San Antonio, La Vernia	
	0.6	0.97	Loop 107 west	
	1.4	2.3	Loop 1604 – St. Hedwig, Elmendorf	
1.000 mi = 1.609 km; 1.000 km = 0.621 mi

== FM 3466 ==
Farm to Market Road 3466
- Location: Hale County
- Length: 3.057 mi (4.920 km)
- Existed: March 14, 1984–present

Farm to Market Road 3466 (FM 3466) runs from I-27 in Plainview on southwest Third St eastward to FM 400.

== FM 3467 ==
Farm to Market Road 3467
- Location: Bell County
- Existed: June 21, 1984–July 10, 1989

Farm to Market Road 3467 (FM 3467) was located in Bell County. No highway currently uses the FM 3467 designation.

FM 3467 was designated on June 21, 1984, from US 190 and Loop 121 west of Belton, northeast 3.0 miles (4.8 km) to FM 439. On July 10, 1989, FM 3467 was cancelled and transferred to Loop 121.

== FM 3468 ==
Farm to Market Road 3468
- Location: Childress County
- Length: 0.982 mi (1,580 m)
- Existed: August 24, 1988–present

Farm to Market Road 3468 (FM 3468) is located in Childress County. It runs from FM 164 west of Childress southward to FM 2042.

=== FM 3468 (1984) ===
Farm to Market Road 3468
- Location: Bexar County
- Existed: July 24, 1984–March 30, 1988

A previous route numbered FM 3468 was designated in Bexar County on July 24, 1984, from Loop 1604, 2.9 miles (4.7 km) south of US 87, southeast 1.6 miles (2.6 km) to the Wilson County line. FM 3468 was cancelled on March 30, 1988, by district request and transferred to FM 3432.

== FM 3469 ==
Farm to Market Road 3469
- Location: Live Oak County
- Length: 1.625 mi (2.615 km)
- Existed: March 20, 1985–present

Farm to Market Road 3469 (FM 3469) runs from FM 624, northwest of the Jim Wells County Line, southwestward to the Jim Wells County Line.

== FM 3470 ==
Farm to Market Road 3470
- Location: Bell County
- Length: 7.205 mi (11.595 km)
- Existed: August 25, 1985–present

Farm to Market Road 3470 (FM 3470) is located in Bell County in the city of Killeen. The highway is known locally as the Stan Schlueter Loop.

FM 3470 begins at an intersection with SH 201 near the Killeen Regional Airport. The highway runs through an area that features a mix of residential and commercial properties and has a junction with SH 195. FM 3470 continues to run through commercial and residential areas and has a junction with I-14 / US 190 just before ending at an intersection with FM 2410.

FM 3470 was designated on August 25, 1985, running from US 190 east of Killeen near Nolan Road, westward and northward to near Clear Creek Road west of Killeen at a distance of 7.8 miles (12.6 km). On July 19, 1989, the highway was re-aligned, running from US 190 at Clear Creek Road, southward, eastward, and northward to US 190 at Elms Road at a distance of 8.9 miles (14.3 km). On June 27, 1995, the entire route was redesignated Urban Road 3470 (UR 3470). The section of highway along Clear Creek Road was transferred to SH 201 on January 31, 2002. The designation of the remaining section reverted to FM 3470 with the elimination of the Urban Road system on November 15, 2018.

Junction list

The entire route is in Killeen, Bell County.

mi	km	Destinations	Notes
0.0	0.0	SH 201 (Clear Creek Road) – Killeen Regional Airport	
3.1	5.0	SH 195 (Fort Hood Street)	Interchange
7.0	11.3	I-14 / US 190 (Central Texas Expressway) – Copperas Cove, Lampasas, Belton, Temple	I-14 exit 286
7.2	11.6	FM 2410 (Martin Luther King Jr. Boulevard)	
1.000 mi = 1.609 km; 1.000 km = 0.621 mi

== FM 3471 ==
Farm to Market Road 3471
- Location: Shelby County
- Length: 2.04 mi (3.28 km)
- Existed: February 26, 1986–present

Farm to Market Road 3471 (FM 3471) runs from FM 2694, west of FM 139, southward to New Harmony.

== FM 3472 ==
Farm to Market Road 3472
- Location: Ector County
- Length: 2.016 mi (3.244 km)
- Existed: February 26, 1986–present

Farm to Market Road 3472 (FM 3472) runs in Odessa from SH 302 westward to FM 1936.

== FM 3473 ==
Farm to Market Road 3473
- Location: Franklin County
- Existed: February 26, 1986–February 27, 1997

Farm to Market Road 3473 (FM 3473) was located in Franklin County. No highway currently uses the FM 3473 designation.

FM 3473 was designated on February 26, 1986, running from SH 37 southwestward to US 67 in Mount Vernon at a distance of 1.5 miles (2.4 km). The highway was cancelled on February 27, 1997, with the mileage being transferred to SH 37.

== RM 3474 ==
Ranch to Market Road 3474
- Location: Hutchinson County
- Length: 0.686 mi (1,104 m)
- Existed: April 29, 1986–present

Ranch to Market 3474 (RM 3474) is a 0.7-mile (1.1 km) route in Hutchinson County. It is the shortest route of the Ranch to Market system.

The western terminus of RM 3474 is along Par Avenue northwest of Borger. The route runs eastward, just north of the Borger city limits, before ending at a junction with SH 136/SH 152/SH 207.

RM 3474 was designated on April 29, 1986, along its current route.

== FM 3475 ==
Farm to Market Road 3475
- Location: Lavaca County
- Length: 2.061 mi (3.317 km)
- Existed: February 26, 1986–present

Farm to Market Road 3475 (FM 3475) runs from US 77A, north of Yoakum at SH 95, southeastward to FM 318.

== FM 3476 ==
Farm to Market Road 3476
- Location: McLennan County
- Length: 2.801 mi (4.508 km)
- Existed: October 29, 1986–present

Farm to Market Road 3476 (FM 3476) runs from SH 6 southwest of Waco, southwestward to FM 2063 in Hewitt.

== FM 3477 ==
Farm to Market Road 3477
- Location: Gillespie County
- Length: 4.7 mi (7.6 km)
- Existed: September 24, 1986–present

Farm to Market Road 3477 (FM 3477) runs from US 290 southeast of Fredericksburg westward and northward to US 87, northwest of Fredericksburg.

== FM 3478 ==
Farm to Market Road 3478
- Location: Walker County
- Length: 7.267 mi (11.695 km)
- Existed: November 26, 1986–present

Farm to Market Road 3478 (FM 3478) runs from FM 980 near the Texas Department of Corrections (Ellis Unit) northward to FM 230.

== FM 3479 ==
Farm to Market Road 3479
- Location: Tarrant County
- Length: 1.385 mi (2.229 km)
- Existed: December 22, 1986–present

Farm to Market Road 3479 (FM 3479) is located in northern Fort Worth in Tarrant County.

FM 3479 begins at FM 156. It travels east along Harmon Road before turning to the north and ending at an interchange with the US 81/US 287 freeway.

FM 3479 was designated on December 22, 1986, along its current route. The route was redesignated Urban Road 3479 (UR 3479) on June 27, 1995. The designation reverted to FM 3479 with the elimination of the Urban Road system on November 15, 2018.

== FM 3480 ==
Farm to Market Road 3480
- Location: Kimble County
- Length: 1.713 mi (2.757 km)
- Existed: April 30, 1987–present

Farm to Market Road 3480 (FM 3480) runs from US 377 southwest of London eastward to FM 385.

== FM 3481 ==
Farm to Market Road 3481
- Location: Bell County
- Length: 5.174 mi (8.327 km)
- Existed: April 30, 1987–present

Farm to Market Road 3481 (FM 3481) runs from FM 2410 south of Harker Heights southward to FM 2484.

== FM 3482 ==
Farm to Market Road 3482
- Location: Angelina County
- Length: 1.879 mi (3.024 km)
- Existed: April 30, 1987–present

Farm to Market Road 3482 (FM 3482) runs from US 59 south of Lufkin southeastward to FM 58.

== FM 3483 ==
Farm to Market Road 3483
- Location: San Augustine County
- Length: 2.201 mi (3.542 km)
- Existed: April 30, 1987–present

Farm to Market Road 3483 (FM 3483) runs from SH 21 in San Augustine, southeastward 2.201 miles (3.542 km).

== FM 3484 ==
Farm to Market Road 3484
- Location: Mills County
- Length: 2.604 mi (4.191 km)
- Existed: April 30, 1987–present

Farm to Market Road 3484 (FM 3484) runs from FM 573, north of Mullin, eastward to a junction with FM 1029.

== FM 3485 ==
Farm to Market Road 3485
- Location: Collin County
- Existed: April 30, 1987–April 24, 2003

Farm to Market Road 3485 (FM 3485) was located in Collin County. No highway currently uses the FM 3485 designation.

FM 3485 was designated on April 30, 1987, from FM 1378 west 1.7 miles (2.7 km) to FM 2551. On April 24, 2003, FM 3485 was cancelled by district request and removed from the highway system as the county was unable to secure right-of-way for the route. The highway would have followed West Lucas Road.

== FM 3486 ==
Farm to Market Road 3486
- Location: Kaufman County
- Length: 2.6 mi (4.2 km)
- Existed: April 30, 1987–present

Farm to Market Road 3486 (FM 3486) runs from SH 34, northeast of Terrell, northwestward to FM 986.

== FM 3487 ==
Farm to Market Road 3487 (FM 3487) is a designation that has been used twice. No highway currently uses the FM 3487 designation.

=== FM 3487 (1987) ===
Farm to Market Road 3487
- Location: Childress County
- Existed: April 30, 1987–August 4, 1988

The first route numbered FM 3487 was designated in Childress County on April 30, 1987, running from FM 3031 to FM 2042 at a distance of approximately 3.0 miles (4.8 km). The route was cancelled and combined with FM 2042 on August 4, 1988.

=== FM 3487 (1988) ===
Farm to Market Road 3487
- Location: Bexar County
- Existed: December 30, 1988–December 18, 2014

The second route numbered FM 3487 was designated in Bexar County on December 30, 1988, running from FM 471 to I-410/SH 16. The highway was internally redesignated as Urban Road 3487 by TxDOT on June 27, 1995. The designation was canceled on December 18, 2014, and control was returned to the city of San Antonio as part of TxDOT's San Antonio turnback program, which gave 21.8 miles of roads to the city.

Junction list

The entire route was in San Antonio, Bexar County.

mi	km	Destinations	Notes
0.0	0.0	I-410 (Connally Loop) / SH 16	I-410 exit 10
0.3	0.48	FM 1957 west (Potranco Road)	
3.3	5.3	FM 471 (Culebra Road, Grissom Road) / Tezel Road	
1.000 mi = 1.609 km; 1.000 km = 0.621 mi

== FM 3488 ==
Farm to Market Road 3488
- Location: Polk County
- Length: 1.0 mi (1.6 km)
- Existed: May 31, 2012–present

Farm to Market Road 3488 (FM 3488) runs from US 59 in Corrigan westward 0.5 mile (0.8 km), then northward 0.5 mile (0.8 km) to its terminus.

=== FM 3488 (1987) ===
Farm to Market Road 3488
- Location: Webb County
- Existed: April 30, 1987–April 1, 1988

A previous route numbered FM 3488 was designated on April 30, 1987, from I-35 north of Laredo to a point 2.0 miles (3.2 km) east. FM 3488 was cancelled on April 1, 1988, and transferred to FM 3464 (now Loop 20).

== FM 3489 ==
Farm to Market Road 3489
- Location: Dallam and Hartley counties
- Length: 2.976 mi (4.789 km)
- Existed: April 30, 1987–present

Farm to Market Road 3489 (FM 3489) runs from FM 1727, west of US 87, southward to FM 694.

== FM 3490 ==
Farm to Market Road 3490
- Location: Knox County
- Length: 1.082 mi (1.741 km)
- Existed: April 30, 1987–present

Farm to Market Road 3490 (FM 3490) runs from FM 267, northwest of Munday, eastward to FM 2811.

== FM 3491 ==
Farm to Market Road 3491
- Location: Young County
- Length: 0.485 mi (781 m)
- Existed: April 30, 1987–present

Farm to Market Road 3491 (FM 3491) runs from US 380 at the northeast edge of Graham northward to SH 16.

== FM 3492 ==
Farm to Market Road 3492
- Location: Wichita County
- Length: 3.754 mi (6.041 km)
- Existed: April 30, 1987–present

Farm to Market Road 3492 (FM 3492) runs from FM 369 northwest of Wichita Falls eastward to I-44.

== FM 3493 ==
Farm to Market Road 3493
- Location: Wharton County
- Existed: April 30, 1987–October 28, 1991

Farm to Market Road 3493 (FM 3493) was located in Wharton County. No highway currently uses the FM 3493 designation.

FM 3493 was designated on April 30, 1987, from SH 60 south 0.9 miles (1.4 km) to FM 1299. On October 28, 1991, FM 3493 was cancelled by district request and transferred to FM 1299 when it was rerouted.

== FM 3494 ==
Farm to Market Road 3494
- Location: San Patricio County
- Existed: April 30, 1987–June 25, 1991

Farm to Market Road 3494 (FM 3494) ran in Ingleside, from SH 361 southeastward to FM 2725.

== FM 3495 ==
Farm to Market Road 3495
- Location: Haskell County
- Length: 2.856 mi (4.596 km)
- Existed: April 30, 1987–present

Farm to Market Road 3495 (FM 3495) runs from FM 618, southeast of Haskell, eastward to Scott Memorial Park.

== FM 3496 ==
Farm to Market Road 3496
- Location: Cooke County
- Length: 3.655 mi (5.882 km)
- Existed: April 30, 1987–present

Farm to Market Road 3496 (FM 3496) runs from FM 372, north of FM 922, northward to FM 902.

== FM 3497 ==
Farm to Market Road 3497
- Location: Tyler County
- Length: 0.623 mi (1,003 m)
- Existed: April 30, 1987–present

Farm to Market Road 3497 (FM 3497) runs from US 190 east of Woodville northward to the entrance of Woodville Prison Site.

== FM 3498 ==
Farm to Market Road 3498
- Location: Atascosa County
- Length: 0.861 mi (1,386 m)
- Existed: December 30, 1988–present

Farm to Market Road 3498 (FM 3498) runs from Loop 282 in Poteet southeastward to FM 476.

== FM 3499 ==
Farm to Market Road 3499
- Location: Bexar County
- Length: 0.373 mi (600 m)
- Existed: December 30, 1988–present

Farm to Market Road 3499 (FM 3499) runs from a point on FM 1937 south of Losoya southwestward Loop 1604.
