= Texas State Highway 195 =

State highway in Texas

State Highway 195
- SH 195; mainline in red, business route in blue

Route information
- Maintained by TxDOT
- Length: 34.731 mi (55.894 km)
- Existed: by 1939 (current route 1988)–present

Major junctions
- South end: I-35 near Georgetown
- I-14 / US 190 in Killeen
- North end: FM 439 in Fort Hood

Location
- Country: United States
- State: Texas

Highway system
- Highways in Texas; Interstate; US; State; Former; Toll; Loops; Spurs; FM/RM; Park; Rec
← SH 194	→ SH 196

State Highway 195 (SH 195) is a state highway in the U.S. state of Texas that runs from Interstate 35 in Georgetown north to FM 439 in Killeen. In Killeen, SH 195 is known as Fort Hood Street, as the highway leads to the entrance of Fort Hood. The Texas Memorial Highway System has designated the entire road as the Phantom Warriors Highway.

== History ==
This route was designated on June 5, 1933, from Georgetown and turned approximately one mile (1.6 km) north of Florence, to meet up with SH 74 (now U.S. Highway 183), as a renumbering of a portion of SH 74, which was rerouted further west. The section from Killeen southwest 5 miles was originally designated FM 440 on June 11, 1945, but was extended south 3.8 miles on May 26, 1949, and to SH 195 in Florence on May 23, 1951. FM 440 was redesignated as RM 440 on October 1, 1956. On January 27, 1988, the section of SH 195 from Florence to U.S. Highway 183 was redesignated as SH 138. SH 195 was rerouted over RM 440 north to US 190 in Killeen. The section of RM 440 from Business US 190 to US 190 became part of FM 439. On January 31, 2002, SH 195 was extended north over part of FM 439 to the east gate of Fort Hood, as part of FM 439 from there to FM 2410 was cancelled, and FM 439 was rerouted south replacing part of FM 2410 to BU 190-F & FM 2410.

As of October 2005, portions of the highway between Killeen and Florence are four lanes with median, or two lanes with shoulders. In Florence, the highway becomes a four-lane road with traffic signals at the intersection of FM 487, as well as the intersection of FM 970, near Florence Middle School and Florence High School. South of FM 970, it is a two-lane road all the way to Interstate 35.

As of October 2005, SH 195 is undergoing a major overhaul. The former two-lane highway is being widened to four lanes with a median and shoulders. The project has been broken up into phases. In the first phase, the road was widened from just south of FM 3470 in Killeen (known locally as Stan Schlueter Loop) to near the intersection with RM 2670 in the community of Ding Dong. The second phase added two new bridges over the Lampasas River and extended to near the Bell–Williamson county line. The third and final phase was completed. It begins 3 miles south of State Highway 138 near Florence and stretches to Ronald Reagan Boulevard in Georgetown. Due to federally protected bugs which reside in caves under the 195 roads, the progression of the final phase was delayed until funding could be produced to purchase these caves. In the future, new phases will create a divided highway along the entire length of SH 195. A bypass was constructed around the town of Florence, so that travellers can avoid the before-school and after-school traffic in Florence.

There are several reasons for the construction project. The road was once known in Central Texas as the "Highway of Death" due to the many fatal accidents on 195. One small period between 1996 and 1998 saw the loss of 21 lives. The road's new design will ease traffic congestion caused by daily commutes to Georgetown and Austin, since the road is the only route directly to I-35 from Killeen, besides I-14/US 190. Also, the new highway will facilitate vehicle movement in the event of a deployment of troops from Fort Hood en route to Interstate 35.

On May 31, 2007, the highway officially reopened to the public as the finished divided highway.

== Business route ==
SH 195 has one signed business route, Business State Highway 195-H (Bus. SH 195-H), which is a former routing of SH 195 through Florence. The designation took effect on March 26, 2020, and was one of several realignments of SH 195, which also included the designation of Spur 376 and Spur 377.

== Major intersections ==
County	Location	mi	km	Destinations	Notes
Williamson		0.000	0.000	I-35 – Austin, Waco	Southern terminus; Interchange
Williamson				Shell Road / County Road 143	Proposed; future interchange
Williamson				Spur 377 north (Rattlesnake Road)	Former segment of SH 195
Williamson				Spur 376 north	Former segment of SH 195
Williamson				Spur 376 south / County Road 241	Former segment of SH 195
Williamson				Bus. SH 195 – Florence	Interchange
Williamson	Florence			FM 487 – Jarrell, Florence	Interchange
Williamson				SH 138 – Lampasas	Interchange
Williamson				Bus. SH 195 – Florence	Interchange; No northbound exit
Bell				FM 2670 (Maxdale Road)	
Bell				FM 2484 – Youngsport	
Bell	Killeen			SH 201 (Clear Creek Road)	Interchange
Bell	Killeen			FM 3470 (Stan Schlueter Loop)	Interchange
Bell	Killeen			I-14 / US 190 – Copperas Cove, Belton	I-14/US 190 exit 283; interchange.
Bell	Killeen–Fort Hood line			Bus. US 190	
Bell	Killeen–Fort Hood line	34.731	55.894	FM 439 (Rancier Avenue)	Northern terminus; Entrance to Fort Hood
1.000 mi = 1.609 km; 1.000 km = 0.621 mi: Incomplete access; Unopened
