= Nolanville, Texas =

- City
- Motto: A Great Place to Live
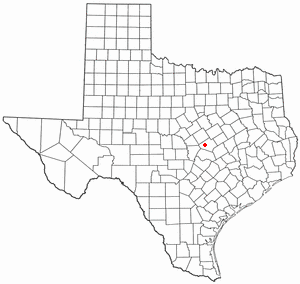
- Location of Nolanville, L, Texas

- Coordinates: 31°04′44″N 97°37′20″W
- Country: United States
- State: Texas
- County: Bell

Area
  - Total: 4.27 sq mi (11.06 km^{2})
  - Land: 4.25 sq mi (11.00 km^{2})
  - Water: 0.023 sq mi (0.06 km^{2})
- Elevation: 676 ft (206 m)

Population (2020)
  - Total: 5,917
  - Density: 1,383.6/sq mi (534.23/km^{2})
- Time zone: UTC-6 (Central (CST))
  - Summer (DST): UTC-5 (CDT)
- ZIP code: 76559
- Area code: 254
- FIPS code: 48-51708
- GNIS feature ID: 2411261
- Website: www.nolanvilletx.gov

Nolanville is a city in Bell County, Texas, United States. The population was 5,917 at the 2020 census. It is part of the Killeen–Temple–Fort Hood Metropolitan Statistical Area.

== History ==
Nolanville reached its peak as a town between 1890 and 1900, when it went into a holding pattern. A weekly newspaper, the Item, was started by 1896. The first telephone service in Nolanville was started, using barbed wire for lines. Two lines were used, a south and a north, with Nolan Creek serving as the dividing line. Nolanville School, one of the larger rural schools in the county in the early 20th century, had 90 pupils in 1903. The first automobile appeared between 1900 and 1910. The automobile caused Nolanville businesses to decline because it made the trip to Belton or Killeen so much easier.

In 1921, a new two-story brick school was built, and in 1938, the original part of the present school plant was built. By the mid-1940s, the community had 150 to 200 residents, but began to decline after the end of World War II. After dropping to 50 inhabitants in the 1950s, the town began to revive in the 1960s and had 200 residents and six businesses when it incorporated on March 27, 1961. By the late 1960s Nolanville was caught up in the expansion of the Killeen-Fort Hood area, and, as a suburban community, its population rose to 740 in 1968. Nolanville was featured in a 1970s 60 Minutes episode, which exposed creative law enforcement practices.

Nolanville Common School District #50 ceased to exist in the spring of 1972, when it was annexed to the Killeen Independent School District by the Bell County Board of School Trustees. This action was requested by the Nolanville Board of School Trustees. The Nolanville Common School District was one of only three remaining common school districts in Bell County at that time. It was also uncommon for a school to consolidate because its enrollment and academic needs were greater than its capacity rather than because enrollment had dropped.

By 1974, Nolanville's population was 1,050. It had grown to 1,834 in 1990 and 2,150 in 2000, then jumped to 4,259 as of the 2010 census.

The city became home rule in the 2011 election. The city motto is "A Great Place to Live." Demographics suggest a high number of youth live in the city. Nolanville is a common starting point for endurance bicycling and running. Special events include the Annual Fox Trot 5K and Train Whistle Jamboree.

== Geography ==
Nolanville is located in west-central Bell County and is bordered by the city of Harker Heights on the south and west. Interstate 14/U.S. Highway 190, a four-lane freeway, passes through Nolanville, leading east 8 miles (13 km) to Interstate 35 in Belton and west 13 miles (21 km) to the entrance to Fort Hood at the western edge of Killeen.

According to the United States Census Bureau, the city of Nolanville has a total area of 3.5 square miles (9.0 km^{2}), of which 0.019 square miles (0.05 km^{2}), or 0.51%, is covered by water.

=== Climate ===
The climate in this area is characterized by hot, humid summers and generally mild to cool winters. According to the Köppen climate classification system, Nolanville is in the Cfa climate group (humid subtropical climate) on climate maps.

== Demographics ==
Historical population
Census	Pop.	Note	%±
1970	902		—
1980	1,308		45.0%
1990	1,834		40.2%
2000	2,150		17.2%
2010	4,259		98.1%
2020	5,917		38.9%
2023 (est.)	7,010		18.5%
U.S. Decennial Census; 2013 Estimate

=== 2020 census ===
As of the 2020 census, Nolanville had a population of 5,917 people in 2,053 households, including 1,417 families, and the median age was 33.4 years. 28.8% of residents were under the age of 18 and 9.0% of residents were 65 years of age or older. For every 100 females there were 94.8 males, and for every 100 females age 18 and over there were 93.2 males age 18 and over.

94.7% of residents lived in urban areas, while 5.3% lived in rural areas.

There were 2,053 households in Nolanville, of which 43.3% had children under the age of 18 living in them. Of all households, 54.2% were married-couple households, 16.2% were households with a male householder and no spouse or partner present, and 22.5% were households with a female householder and no spouse or partner present. About 17.1% of all households were made up of individuals and 4.8% had someone living alone who was 65 years of age or older.

There were 2,199 housing units, of which 6.6% were vacant. The homeowner vacancy rate was 2.4% and the rental vacancy rate was 5.0%.

Racial composition as of the 2020 census
Race	Number	Percent
White	3,189	53.9%
Black or African American	1,048	17.7%
American Indian and Alaska Native	73	1.2%
Asian	117	2.0%
Native Hawaiian and Other Pacific Islander	57	1.0%
Some other race	561	9.5%
Two or more races	872	14.7%
Hispanic or Latino (of any race)	1,493	25.2%

=== 2000 census ===
As of the census of 2000, 2,150 people, 781 households, and 582 families resided in the city. The population density was 850.0 inhabitants per square mile (328.2/km^{2}). The 907 housing units averaged 358.6/sq mi (138.4/km^{2}). The racial makeup of the city was 78.74% White, 7.77% African American, 1.30% Native American, 1.16% Asian, 0.19% Pacific Islander, 7.26% from other races, and 3.58% from two or more races. Hispanics or Latinos of any race were 17.40% of the population.

Of the 781 households, 43.5% had children under the age of 18 living with them, 57.2% were married couples living together, 12.7% had a female householder with no husband present, and 25.4% were not families. About 20.6% of all households were made up of individuals, and 5.1% had someone living alone who was 65 years of age or older. The average household size was 2.75 and the average family size was 3.16.

In the city, the population was distributed as 31.3% under the age of 18, 10.7% from 18 to 24, 33.8% from 25 to 44, 18.0% from 45 to 64, and 6.3% who were 65 years of age or older. The median age was 29 years. For every 100 females, there were 101.5 males. For every 100 females age 18 and over, there were 99.2 males.

The median income for a household in the city was $36,140, and for a family was $38,045. Males had a median income of $26,490 versus $21,970 for females. The per capita income for the city was $14,163. About 9.9% of families and 12.3% of the population were below the poverty line, including 16.5% of those under age 18 and 11.9% of those age 65 or over.

== Education ==
Nolanville is served by the Killeen Independent School District. Nolanville has two elementary schools. (Nolanville and Richard E Cavazos)
