= Harker Heights, Texas =

- City
- City of Harker Heights
- Motto: The Bright Star of Central Texas
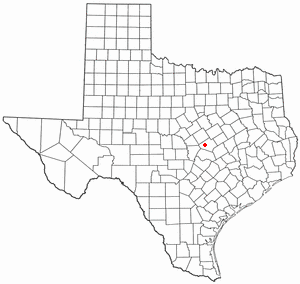
- Location of Harker Heights, Texas

- Coordinates: 31°03′06″N 97°37′38″W
- Country: United States
- State: Texas
- County: Bell

Area
  - Total: 15.66 sq mi (40.55 km^{2})
  - Land: 15.61 sq mi (40.43 km^{2})
  - Water: 0.046 sq mi (0.12 km^{2})
- Elevation: 817 ft (249 m)

Population (2020)
  - Total: 33,097
  - Density: 2,077.0/sq mi (801.95/km^{2})
- Time zone: UTC-6 (Central (CST))
  - Summer (DST): UTC-5 (CDT)
- ZIP codes: 76542, 76543, 76548
- Area code: 254
- FIPS code: 48-32312
- GNIS feature ID: 2410701
- Website: www.harkerheights.gov

Harker Heights is a city in Bell County, Texas, United States. As of the 2020 census, 33,097 people resided in the city, up from a population of 17,308 in 2000. This makes Harker Heights the third-largest city in Bell County, after Killeen and Temple. Incorporated in 1960, the city derives its name from one of the two original landowners and founder, Harley Kern. Harker Heights is part of the Killeen–Temple–Fort Hood metropolitan area.

== History ==
Harker Heights is located near Fort Hood, a major United States Army post that was designated a permanent military facility in 1950. As the post expanded, the surrounding civilian population increased. Water Control and Improvement District No. 4 was established on land near the Killeen city limits and the military post in 1955, and included the land owned by Pinckney R. Cox and Harley Kern, two hog farmers. These two men subdivided their land in 1957 and began selling lots. By 1960, between 600 and 700 of the lots had been developed and new residents supplied with water and other utility services. Following a petition for an incorporation election, the city was established on September 24, 1960, and Cox was elected mayor. Kern had died before the incorporation, and the Harker in Harker Heights was a concatenation of Harley Kern's name as a tribute to one of the original landowners. The town's boundaries expanded to include Forest Hills, Highland Oaks, and Comanche Hills. Cox, Sam Garth Jr., and Barney Sissom created GIASISCO Corporation, which was meant to help expand the town from 400 to 950 acres (160 to 380 ha).

== Geography ==
Harker Heights is bordered by the city of Killeen to the west and Nolanville to the east. The city limits extend south to hills overlooking Stillhouse Hollow Lake on the Lampasas River.

Interstate 14/U.S. Highway 190 is a four-lane freeway that passes through the city, connecting Killeen to the west with Interstate 35 in Belton 12 miles (19 km) to the east, at a point about halfway between Waco and Austin.

According to the United States Census Bureau, Harker Heights has a total area of 15.2 square miles (39.4 km^{2}), of which 0.04 square miles (0.1 km^{2}), or 0.32%, is covered by water.

== Demographics ==
Historical population
| Census | Pop. | Note | %± |
|---|---|---|---|
| 1970 | 4,216 | | — |
| 1980 | 7,345 | | 74.2% |
| 1990 | 12,841 | | 74.8% |
| 2000 | 17,308 | | 34.8% |
| 2010 | 26,700 | | 54.3% |
| 2020 | 33,097 | | 24.0% |
| 2023 (est.) | 34,447 | | 4.1% |
U.S. Decennial Census

=== 2020 census ===
As of the 2020 census, Harker Heights had a population of 33,097, 11,610 households, and 8,082 families residing in the city. The median age was 34.6 years, with 27.7% of residents under the age of 18 and 10.7% of residents 65 years of age or older. For every 100 females there were 93.9 males, and for every 100 females age 18 and over there were 90.6 males age 18 and over.

98.7% of residents lived in urban areas, while 1.3% lived in rural areas.

There were 11,610 households in Harker Heights, of which 41.5% had children under the age of 18 living in them. Of all households, 54.7% were married-couple households, 15.6% were households with a male householder and no spouse or partner present, and 24.5% were households with a female householder and no spouse or partner present. About 20.5% of all households were made up of individuals and 6.1% had someone living alone who was 65 years of age or older.

There were 12,360 housing units, of which 6.1% were vacant. The homeowner vacancy rate was 2.0% and the rental vacancy rate was 6.0%.

Racial composition as of the 2020 census
| Race | Number | Percent |
|---|---|---|
| White | 15,478 | 46.8% |
| Black or African American | 7,596 | 23.0% |
| American Indian and Alaska Native | 276 | 0.8% |
| Asian | 1,578 | 4.8% |
| Native Hawaiian and Other Pacific Islander | 440 | 1.3% |
| Some other race | 2,452 | 7.4% |
| Two or more races | 5,277 | 15.9% |
| Hispanic or Latino (of any race) | 7,359 | 22.2% |

=== 2000 census ===
The population is heavily engaged in economic activities directly or indirectly related to the U.S. Army at nearby Fort Hood (formerly Fort Cavazos). The population density was 1,759.1 inhabitants per square mile (679.2/km^{2}). The 10,347 housing units had 9,488 units occupied, and 859 units vacant. The racial makeup of the city was 62.9% White, 20.0% African American, 1.0% Native American, 3.90% Asian, and 0.90% Pacific Islander; Hispanics or Latinos were 18.4% of the population.

Of the 6,227 households, 42.8% had children under 18 living with them, 62.8% were married couples living together, 9.2% had a female householder with no husband present, and 23.7% were not families. About 18.4% of all households were made up of individuals, and 3.0% had someone living alone who was 65 or older. The average household size was 2.76, and the average family size was 3.13.

In the city, the population was distributed as 30.5% under 18, 10.5% from 18 to 24, 34.8% from 25 to 44, 18.0% from 45 to 64, and 7.2% who were 65 or older. The median age was 31.6 years. For every 100 females, there were 101.0 males. For every 100 females age 18 and over, there were 99.0 males.

The median income for a household in the city was $59,491. The per capita income for the city was $24,161. About 7.4% of families and 10.0% of the population were below the poverty line, including 12.2% of those under age 18 and 4.9% of those age 65 or over.

== Climate ==
The climate in this area is characterized by hot, humid summers and generally mild to cool winters. According to the Köppen climate classification system, Harker Heights has a humid subtropical climate.

== Government ==
In 2022, city voters approved the decriminalization of possession of misdemeanor amounts of marijuana, although it is still illegal under state law.

== Notable people ==
- Ricky D. Gibbs, US Army brigadier general, retired to Harker Heights
