= Bleakwood, Texas =

- Unincorporated community
- Location within Texas Location within the United States
- Coordinates: 30°41′33″N 93°49′21″W
- Country: United States
- State: Texas
- County: Newton
- Elevation: 118 ft (36 m)
- Time zone: UTC-6 (Central (CST))
  - Summer (DST): UTC-5 (CDT)
- Area code: 409
- GNIS feature ID: 1352412

Bleakwood is an unincorporated community in Newton County, Texas, United States. The community is located at the intersection of Texas State Highway 87 and Farm to Market Road 363, 45 miles (72 km) north of Beaumont.

== History ==
While the area which became Bleakwood was inhabited as far back as the early 19th century, the name Bleakwood was first used for it in 1867, when it was used for a new post office; resident T. L. McDonald named it after his home in Scotland. In the late 19th century, the area developed a sizable lumber industry, and two railroads built lines through Bleakwood in the 1900s so its lumber could be exported. Bleakwood's largest lumber plant closed in 1942, and its post office closed the following year; nevertheless, it continued to produce and export lumber products. Its population was estimated to be 300 as of 2000.
