= Little River (Texas) =

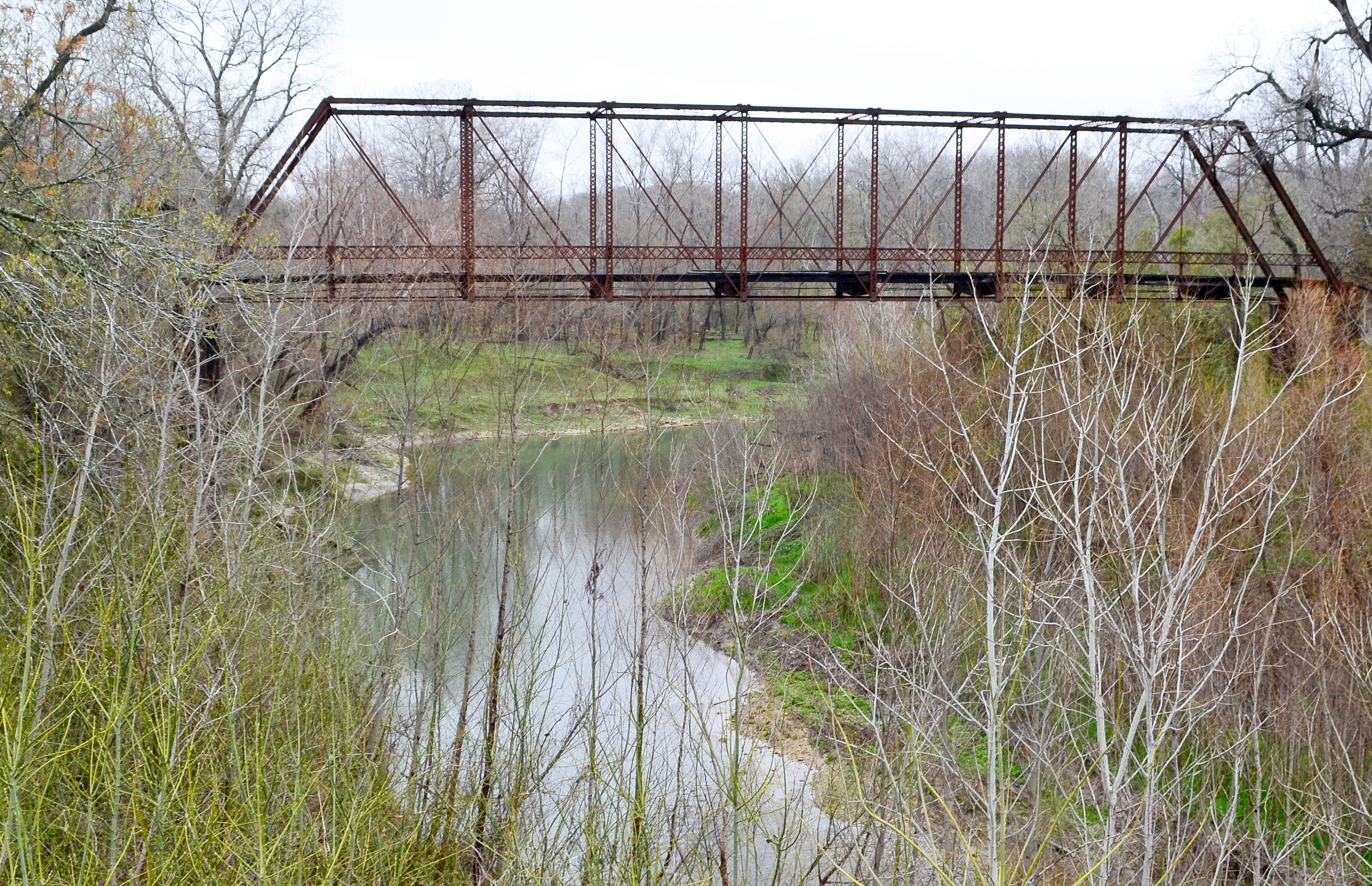
- Abandoned bridge over Little River northeast of Holland, Texas

Location
- Country: United States

Physical characteristics
- Source
  - coordinates: 30.98436°N 97.40219°W
- Mouth
  - coordinates: 30.84178°N 96.67755°W
- Basin size: 36,000 acres (150 km^{2})

The Little River is a river in Central Texas in the Brazos River watershed. It is formed by the confluence of the Leon River and the Lampasas River near Little River, Texas in Bell County. It flows generally southeast for 75 miles (121 km) until it empties into the Brazos River about 5 miles (8.0 km) southwest of Hearne, at a site called Port Sullivan in Milam County. The Little River has a third tributary, the San Gabriel River, which joins the Little about 8 miles (13 km) north of Rockdale and five miles southwest of Cameron. Cameron, the county seat of Milam County and the only city of any significant size on the Little River, was established in 1846.

The Little River and its tributaries provide a drainage basin of 7,560 square miles (19,600 km^{2}) of flat farmland. The Little River is a slow moving body with no rapids, and therefore is not actively used for recreational canoeing or kayaking. The vegetation along its banks is primarily willows, cottonwoods, pecans, elms and sycamores. One of the few instances of commercial use of the river water occurred in the 1980s, when pumping facilities were constructed on the Little River west of Minerva to supplement the water supply of Alcoa Lake.

The Little River has had several names. In 1716, Domingo Ramon reached the river and he named it San Andres. When the Marquis de San Miguel de Aguayo found the river in 1719, he named it Espiritu Santo because he came upon it on the eve of Pentecost. Pedro de Rivera y Villalon found the river in 1727 and believed it was simply an arm of the Brazos. The name San Andres was generally used during the colonial period, however, in the early years of the Republic of Texas the river was called the Little River.

Artifacts have been discovered in the Little River valley, dating from the Archaic Period. These finds indicate the area has supported human habitation for several thousand years. Spanish explorers discovered members of the Lipan Apache and Tonkawa tribes living along the river in the early eighteenth century. The Indians were gradually displaced as European and American settlers began to arrive in the 1840s.

== Leon River ==
The Leon River is a river in Central Texas, which at its confluence with the Lampasas River forms the Little River, near Little River, Texas. The Leon is formed by the confluence of its North, Middle, and South Forks in Eastland County. The Leon River flows about 185 miles southeast, before it joins the Lampasas. The upper reaches of the Leon do not facilitate recreational use since the river only has sufficient water during periods of heavy runoff. The Leon is impounded five miles northwest of Belton to form Belton Lake — a flood control facility and source for drinking water in the Belton and Temple area. From the base of the Belton dam, the Leon continues on a southeast path for about 12 miles until the confluence with the Lampasas River which forms the Little River. The lower sections of the Leon support adequate flow for recreational use year round. These lower sections of the river pass through a scenic portion of the Cross Timbers area of Central Texas. The Leon River obtains its name from the Spanish explorer and colonial governor Alonso de León.

== Lampasas River ==
The headwaters of the Lampasas River are in western Hamilton County 16 miles west of Hamilton. It flows southeast for about 75 miles and runs through Lampasas County, Burnet County and Bell County. In Bell County, the Lampasas turns northeast and is dammed five miles southeast of Belton to form Stillhouse Hollow Lake. The river continues for nine miles past Stillhouse Hollow to the confluence with the Leon River, where the two rivers form the Little River near the town of Little River, Texas. Tributaries to the Lampasas include Bennett, Lucy, Sulpher, Simms, School, and Turkey creeks. The Lampasas passes through flat terrain with shallow depressions, surface soils of clay and sandy loams which support water-tolerant hardwoods, conifers and grasses. The river generally has adequate flow to accommodate canoeing and kayaking with some notable rapids to provide exciting river recreation, especially following rainfall. In particular, the Lampasas rises and flows stronger in the Edwards Plateau, an area with limestone bluffs and a river geography which produces moderate river flow rapids.

The name of the river may come from the Mexican town of Lampazos, deriving its name from Spanish explorers traveling north from Mexico in the Aguayo expedition of 1721. Records indicate the river's name precedes the county's establishment by at least 100 years. Historical records reveal that at least 56 people resided along the river in 1850. Communities that currently lie along the Lampasas include Adamsville, Rumley, Kempner and Oakalla.

== San Gabriel River ==
The third primary tributary to the Little River is the San Gabriel which forms in Georgetown at San Gabriel Park — the confluence of the North and South Forks. About 20 miles east of Georgetown, the river is impounded at Granger to form Granger Lake. The river then flows about 30 more miles in a northeastern direction to its confluence with the Little River, about five miles south of Cameron.

The geography along the San Gabriel is varied, with heavy vegetation on its banks and occasional limestone bluffs in the Balcones Escarpment of the Blackland Prairie. Water levels fluctuate for the entire length of the river. Except during the dry summer periods, there is normally sufficient water for recreational use. Cities and towns along the San Gabriel include Rockdale, Thorndale, Granger, Taylor, Georgetown, Bertram, and Burnet.

The river was named Río de San Francisco Xavier by the Ramon expedition in 1716 and is also recorded in the journals of the Aguayo expedition of 1721. On his map of 1828 Stephen F. Austin mistakenly labeled the river "San Javriel" — his erroneous transposition of "San Xavier." From this, the name morphed into "San Gabriel." The San Xavier missions were founded in 1745 along the river a few miles upstream from the mouth of Brushy Creek — one of the river's minor tributaries. In May, 1839 the San Gabriel was the site of the battle of the San Gabriels, one of the state's most important Indian fights. Brushy Creek was the location of the battle of Brushy Creek in February, 1839.

The South Fork of the San Gabriel forms four miles east of Burnet in Burnet County running 34 miles eastward through Williamson County before it joins the North Fork in Georgetown. The North Fork forms 12 miles north of Burnet in Burnet County and flows southward for 43 miles into Williamson County to its confluence with the South Fork in Georgetown. The North Fork is impounded about three miles northwest of the confluence of the two forks to form Georgetown Lake. The two forks are very similar. Both are scenic, winding rivers with numerous limestone bluffs. However, recreational use is restricted to periods of sufficient rainfall since they tend to not maintain consistent water flow.

The San Gabriel has two other tributaries — the Russell and Middle forks. The Russell Fork begins six miles north of Burnet and then flows into the North Fork. The Middle Fork forms five miles east of Liberty Hill in Williamson County and then flows east to its confluence with the North Fork about one mile west of I-35 near the western city limits of Georgetown. Other seasonal tributaries of the San Gabriel include Brushy, Alligator, Opossum, Berry, Pean, Little and Oatmeal creeks.

== See also ==
- List of rivers of Texas
- Little River-Academy, Texas
