= Rumley, Texas =

- Unincorporated community
- Location within Texas
- Coordinates: 31°10′23″N 98°04′05″W
- Country: United States
- State: Texas
- County: Lampasas
- Elevation: 961 ft (293 m)
- Time zone: UTC-6 (Central (CST))
  - Summer (DST): UTC-5 (CDT)
- Area codes: 512 and 737
- GNIS feature ID: 1380471

Rumley is an unincorporated community in Lampasas County, Texas, United States. According to the Handbook of Texas, the community had a population of eight in 2000. It is located within the Killeen-Temple-Fort Hood metropolitan area.

== History ==
The area was first settled in the 1870s by ranchers. While the origin of the name is not known for certain, it is thought to be named after the brand of a threshing machine brought into the town by two early settlers. Carl Bearden brought the first cattle herd to Rumley in 1878 and W.O. Williams settled here two years later. The community had a store and a church in 1947. Mail was sent to the community from Kempner. Forty people lived in Rumley from 1939 to 1947. Only eight people lived here in 2000.

== Geography ==
Rumley is located a half mile north of the intersection of Farm to Market Roads 580 and 2527 on the Lampasas River in eastern Lampasas County.

== Education ==
Today the community is served by the Lampasas Independent School District, with elementary-age kids going to Hanna Springs Elementary School.

== See also ==
- U.S. Route 190
- Farm to Market Road 2313
