= Robert Ford (American football) =

American football coach (born 1951)

Profile
- Position: Offensive coordinator

Personal information
- Born: June 21, 1951 (age 75); Belton, Texas, U.S.

Career information
- High school: Belton (TX)
- College: Houston
- NFL draft: 1973: undrafted

Career history
- Saginaw High School (1973) Wide receivers coach; Western Illinois (1974–1976) Wide receivers coach; New Mexico (1977–1979) Wide receivers coach; Oregon State (1980–1981) Wide receivers coach; Mississippi State (1982–1983) Wide receivers coach; Houston Gamblers (1985) Wide receivers coach; Kansas (1986) Wide receivers coach; Texas Tech (1987–1988) Wide receivers coach; Texas A&M (1989–1990) Wide receivers coach; Dallas Cowboys (1991–1997) Tight ends coach; Miami Dolphins (1998–2003) Wide receivers coach; Arizona Cardinals (2004) Wide receivers coach; Oakland Raiders (2006) Offensive quality control coach; Texas Southern (2011) Wide receivers coach; Orlando Guardians (2023) Offensive coordinator & running backs coach

Awards and highlights
- 3× Super Bowl champion (XXVII, XXVIII, XXX); Third-team All-American (1972)

Robert Ford (born June 21, 1951) is an American football coach. He won three Super Bowls with the Dallas Cowboys of the National Football League (NFL). He played college football at the University of Houston. He was previously the offensive coordinator of the Orlando Guardians

== Early life ==
Ford attended Belton High School, where he played as a running back. He accepted a football scholarship from the University of Houston, where he was switched to wide receiver. His roommate was future NFL player Robert Newhouse.

As a sophomore and junior, he was a backup wide receiver. He was named the starter as a senior in 1972, leading the team in receiving with 35 receptions for 538 yards (15.4-yard avg.) and 4 receiving touchdowns, earning third-team All-American honors. He also led in kickoff returns and punt returns. He had 231 receiving yards against San Diego State University. He became the first player in the history of the NCAA to have two 99-yard touchdown receptions, each thrown by QB Terry Peel.

Ford was inducted into the University of Houston Athletics Hall of Honor and the Central Texas Sports Hall of Fame.

== Coaching career ==
In 1973, he began his coaching career in Saginaw High School. In 1974, he was named the wide receivers coach in Western Illinois University. In 1979, he joined the University of New Mexico as their wide receivers coach. In 1980, he was hired by Oregon State University as the wide receivers coach, where he was part of the same staff as future NFL coaches Joe Avezzano and Dave Campo. In 1982, he moved to Mississippi State University to be their wide receivers coach.

In 1985, he spent one season with the Houston Gamblers of the United States Football League before the league folded. He oversaw wide receivers Ricky Sanders, Clarence Verdin and Richard Johnson. Sanders grabbed 48 passes for 538 yards despite playing only 10 games, Verdin caught 84 passes for 1,004 yards and Johnson had 103 catches for 1,384 yards.

In 1986, he was hired by the University of Kansas to be the wide receivers coach. In 1987, he accepted the wide receivers coach position at Texas Tech University. He helped to develop Tyrone Thurman, Eddy Anderson and Wayne Walker as All-Southwest Conference wide receivers and were also named the nation's best group of receivers by The Sporting News in 1988. They finished one-two-three on the school's All-time receiving list.

In 1989, he joined the Texas A&M University coaching staff, helping the team to receive two College Bowl invitations, while guiding wide receiver Shane Garrett to reach the NFL.

In 1991, was hired by head coach Jimmy Johnson to be the tight end coach for the Dallas Cowboys, where he helped to develop All-Pro Jay Novacek. He also contributed to the team winning Super Bowl XXVII, XXVIII and XXX.

In 1998, he followed Johnson to the Miami Dolphins coaching staff as the wide receivers coach, where he had an opportunity to develop Oronde Gadsden, O. J. McDuffie, Tony Martin and Chris Chambers.

In 2004, he was hired by the Arizona Cardinals to be the wide receivers coach. He had the opportunity to coach Larry Fitzgerald, Anquan Boldin and Bryant Johnson.

In 2006, he joined the Oakland Raiders coaching staff as the offensive quality control coach.

Ford was officially hired by the Orlando Guardians on September 13, 2022 On January 1, 2024, it was announced the Guardians would not be a part of the UFL Merger.
