= Gulf, Colorado and San Saba Railway =

Short-line railroad headquartered in Texas

Overview
- Headquarters: Brady, Texas
- Reporting mark: GCSR
- Locale: Texas
- Dates of operation: 1993–2013
- Predecessor: Atchison, Topeka and Santa Fe Railway
- Successor: Heart of Texas Railroad

Technical
- Track gauge: 4 ft 8 1/2 in (1,435 mm)
- Length: 67.5 miles (108.6 km)

The Gulf, Colorado and San Saba Railway (reporting mark GCSR) was a short-line railroad headquartered in Brady, Texas. The GCSR operated a former Santa Fe branch line from an interchange with the BNSF Railway at Lometa to Brady. The company declared bankruptcy in 2012 and sold the line to the Heart of Texas Railroad in 2013.

== History ==
Construction of the line westward from Lometa began in 1910, and by the end of 1911 passenger, mail, and freight service extended from Lometa via San Saba and Brady all the way to the endpoints of Eden and Menard. Shipments of grain and livestock (cattle, calves, sheep, and goats) were the primary sources of revenue on the line until the traffic shifted to truck transportation in the 1960s. By 1972, the Santa Fe abandoned the lines west of Brady, and in the following two decades closed most of its stations as well. The GCSR bought the line from Santa Fe subsidiary Gulf, Colorado and Santa Fe Railroad on May 11, 1993.

The company filed for reorganization under Chapter 11 of the Federal Bankruptcy Code on July 3, 2012. The Heart of Texas Railroad agreed to buy the railroad on December 17, 2012, and began operating under the new name January 29, 2013.
