= Nix, Texas =

- Unincorporated community
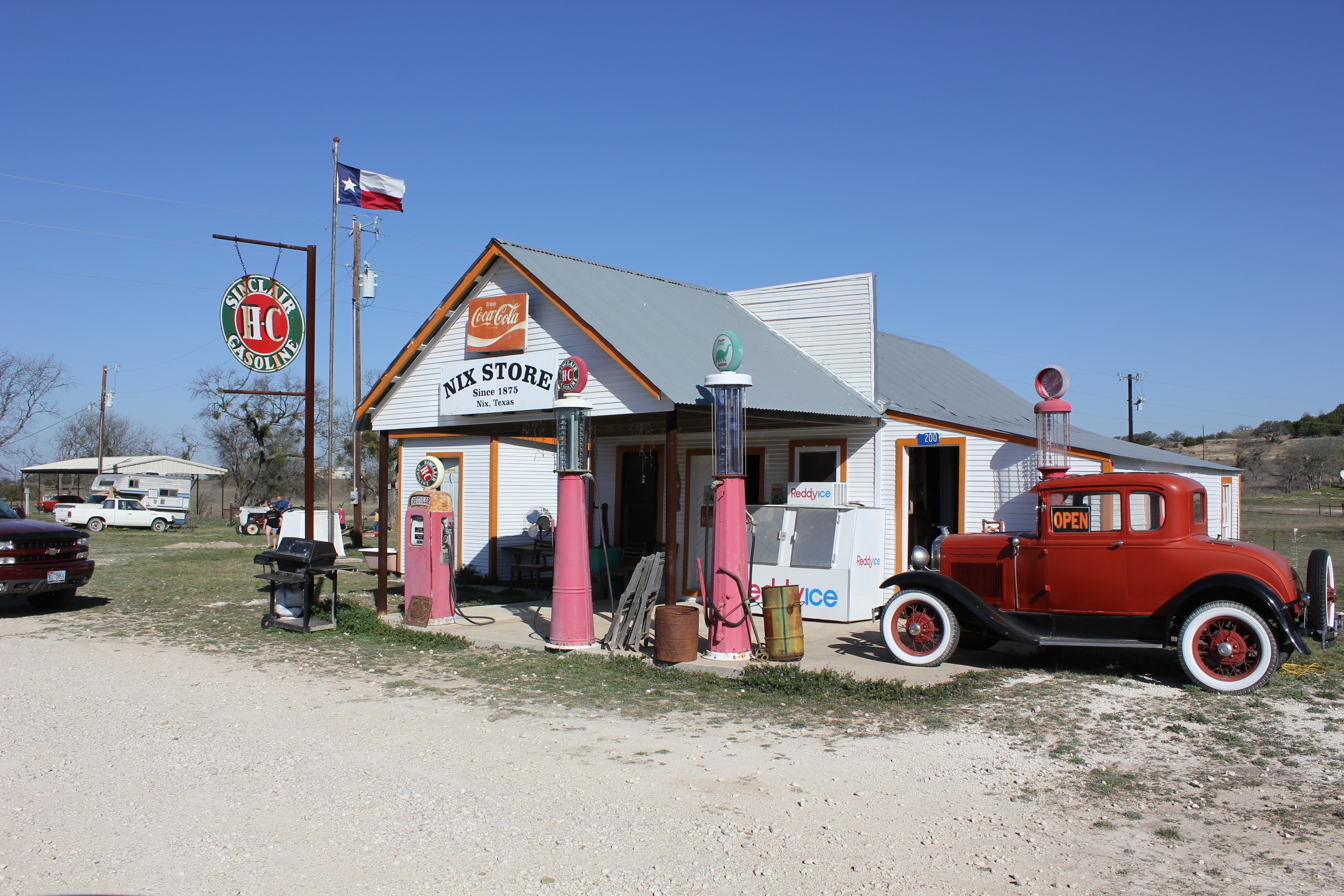
- Nix General Store

- Location within Texas Location within the United States
- Coordinates: 31°06′29″N 98°22′01″W
- Country: United States
- State: Texas
- County: Lampasas
- Elevation: 1,362 ft (415 m)
- Time zone: UTC-6 (Central (CST))
  - Summer (DST): UTC-5 (CDT)
- GNIS feature ID: 2034979

Nix is an unincorporated community in southwestern Lampasas County, Texas, United States. It was once a stop on a stagecoach route. According to the Handbook of Texas, it had a population of only six in 2000. It is located within the Killeen-Temple-Fort Hood metropolitan area.

== History ==
The Fort Phantom Hill Road, a Texas Fort Trail, ran through Nix in the 1850s. The community was settled in the early 1880s on the stagecoach and mail route that ran west from Lampasas. In 1883, David Coterell started a blacksmith shop, and Elizabeth Wallace opened a general store. Wallace was the first postmistress when she opened a post office in her store. The post office was discontinued in 1906. Nix had two mills and gins by 1892, and churches had been established by 1896. Considerable interest arose in drilling for gas and oil in the area during the 1920s and 1930s, though Nix was the site of the county's only dry test well.

By 1947, a combination church/school had been established west of the community. The population of Nix reached its peak of 27 in 1896. In 2000, six people were living in Nix. A Texas historical marker was placed in front of the school in 2007.

== Geography ==
Nix is located on Farm to Market Road 580, 11.5 mi (18.5 km) west of Lampasas in southwestern Lampasas County.

== Education ==
Today the community is served by the Lampasas Independent School District, with elementary-age kids going to Hanna Springs Elementary School.
