= Ada, Lampasas County, Texas =

Ghost town in Texas, US

Ada
- Ghost town
- Location in Texas
- Coordinates: 31°13′03″N 98°07′02″W
- Country: United States
- State: Texas
- County: Lampasas
- Elevation: 256 ft (78 m)
- USGS Feature ID: 1381362

Ada is a ghost town in Lampasas County, Texas, United States. Settled in 1875, a post office operated there between 1880 and 1886. At its peak, it had a population of 20, and has been abandoned since 1904. It was named for Ada Malony, daughter of postmaster William Malony.
