= Izoro, Texas =

- Unincorporated community
- Location within Texas Location within the United States
- Coordinates: 31°17′40″N 98°4′32″W
- Country: United States
- State: Texas
- County: Lampasas
- Elevation: 1,260 ft (380 m)
- Time zone: UTC-6 (Central (CST))
  - Summer (DST): UTC-5 (CDT)
- Area code: 325
- GNIS feature ID: 1379992

Izoro is an unincorporated community in Lampasas County, in the U.S. state of Texas. According to the Handbook of Texas, the community had a population of 17 in 2000. It is located within the Killeen-Temple-Fort Hood metropolitan area.

== Education ==
Izoro had its own school in 1914. Today, the community is served by the Lampasas Independent School District, with elementary-age kids going to Hanna Springs Elementary School.
