= National Register of Historic Places listings in Lampasas County, Texas =

Location of Lampasas County in Texas

This is a list of the National Register of Historic Places listings in Lampasas County, Texas.

This is intended to be a complete list of properties and districts listed on the National Register of Historic Places in Lampasas County, Texas. There are one district and five individual properties listed on the National Register in the county. The district contains two individually listed properties both of which are Recorded Texas Historic Landmarks including one that is also a State Antiquities Landmark. A separate property is also a Recorded Texas Historic Landmark.

This National Park Service list is complete through NPS recent listings posted March 21, 2025.

== Current listings ==
The locations of National Register properties and districts may be seen in a mapping service provided.

	Name on the Register	Image	Date listed	Location	City or town	Description
1	Lampasas Colored School	Lampasas Colored School	April 24, 2002 (#02000404)	514 College St. 31°03′53″N 98°10′23″W	Lampasas	Recorded Texas Historic Landmark
2	Lampasas County Courthouse	Lampasas County Courthouse	June 21, 1971 (#71000944)	Bounded by S. Live Oak, E. 4th, S. Pecan, and E. 3rd Sts. 31°03′56″N 98°10′40″W	Lampasas	State Antiquities Landmark, Recorded Texas Historic Landmark, part of Lampasas Downtown Historic District
3	Lampasas Downtown Historic District	Lampasas Downtown Historic District	January 28, 2004 (#03001540)	Roughly bounded by Second St., Pecan St., Fourth St. and Chestnut St. 31°04′03″N 98°10′45″W	Lampasas	Includes State Antiquities Landmark, multiple Recorded Texas Historic Landmarks
4	Markward Homestead	Markward Homestead	October 11, 2016 (#16000719)	101 East FM 580; 31°05′00″N 98°10′02″W	Lampasas	
5	Phillips and Trosper Buildings	Phillips and Trosper Buildings	April 30, 1987 (#87000676)	408 and 410 E. Third St. 31°03′56″N 98°10′42″W	Lampasas	Recorded Texas Historic Landmark, part of Lampasas Downtown Historic District
6	US 190 Bridge at the Colorado River	US 190 Bridge at the Colorado River	October 10, 1996 (#96001125)	US 190 at the Lampasas and San Saba Cnty. line 31°13′04″N 98°33′50″W	Lometa	

== See also ==
- National Register of Historic Places listings in Texas
- Recorded Texas Historic Landmarks in Lampasas County
