= Red Murff Field =

Baseball venue in Belton, Texas, US

- Interactive map of Red Murff Field
- Full name: Red Murff Field
- Location: Belton, Texas
- Coordinates: 31.07632°N 97.47119°W
- Owner: UMHB
- Operator: UMHB
- Capacity: 700
- Field size: 320 LF; 395 CF; 320 RF

Construction
- Opened: 2005

Tenant
- UMHB Crusaders (2005- ) (American Southwest Conference)

Red Murff Field is a baseball venue located in Belton, Texas, and home to the Mary Hardin-Baylor Crusaders baseball program of the American Southwest Conference. The field is named after Red Murff, who initiated the UMHB baseball program. The ballpark holds a capacity of 700.

== First Game ==
The Crusaders played their first game at Red Murff Field on February 22, 2005, beating Southwestern Assemblies of God University by a score of 6 to 5.
