= Lometa Independent School District =

School district in Texas

Coordinates: 31.2188°N 98.3881°W

Address
- 100 N 8th St Lometa, Texas, 76853; United States

District information
- Grades: PK–12
- Schools: 1
- NCES District ID: 4827960

Students and staff
- Students: 320 (2023–24)
- Teachers: 25.37 (on an FTE basis)
- Student–teacher ratio: 12.61

Other information
- Website: www.lometaisd.org

Lometa Independent School District is a public school district based in Lometa, Texas, United States.

Located in Lampasas County, a small portion of the district extends into Mills County.

Lometa ISD has one school, Lometa School, that serves students in grades pre-kindergarten through twelve.

== Academic achievement ==
In 2009, the school district was rated "academically acceptable" by the Texas Education Agency.

== Special programs ==
=== Athletics ===
Lometa High School plays six-man football.

== See also ==
- List of school districts in Texas
