= Central Texas and Colorado River Railway =

Short-line railroad

Central Texas & Colorado River Railway
Overview
- Headquarters: Brady, Texas
- Reporting mark: CTXR
- Locale: Texas
- Dates of operation: 2016–2019
- Predecessor: Gulf, Colorado and San Saba Railway

Technical
- Track gauge: 4 ft 8 1/2 in (1,435 mm)
- Length: 67.5 miles (108.6 km)

The Central Texas & Colorado River Railway (reporting mark CTXR) is a short-line railroad headquartered in Brady, Texas. Formerly known as the Heart of Texas Railroad, the railroad operates a portion of the former Santa Fe branch line to Eden, between Brady and an interchange with the BNSF Railway at Lometa. It acquired the line from the bankrupt Gulf, Colorado and San Saba Railway in 2013. The railroad is currently owned by OmniTrax. They bought the railroad in 2016.

== History ==
The Heart of Texas Railroad was organized in 2012 and acquired the 67.5-mile (108.6 km) line from the bankrupt Gulf, Colorado and San Saba Railway in 2013. Operations began on January 29 of that year. On May 19, 2013, a 300-yard (270 m)-long trestle carrying the tracks over the Colorado River about 10 mi (16 km) west of Lometa burned and collapsed. The fire, of unknown origin, began on the western side of the trestle about 4 p.m.; by the time volunteer firefighters from Lometa arrived, the fire was uncontrollable. There were no injuries. At the time the potential loss to the company was estimated at $10 million. The company contracted with JCF Bridge & Concrete to replace the bridge, and the new span opened on May 16, 2014. The bridge cost $4 million.

OmniTRAX announced its acquisition of the company in May 2016.

In August 2019 OmniTRAX filed with the Surface Transportation Board to abandon the line, "citing its dim prospects and millions of dollars in operating losses since it acquired the route in 2016," according to an article in Trains News Wire. The article added: "The prime culprits: New crushed rock traffic that never materialized as expected and rapidly declining shipments of frac sand." Due to bridge problems and unsafe track requiring $2.3 million in repairs on top of the $2 million it had already spent to improve the line after acquiring it just a few years ago, the line had been placed under embargo on July 25, 2019.

According to TNW, "A proposed rock-crushing facility was expected to generate 8,000 to 10,000 loads annually. But the facility never opened as planned in 2017 and is unlikely to ever be developed." Additionally, "The railroad expected to haul just 553 carloads in total this year, down from 1,210 in 2018."

However, on April 1, 2026, it was announced that the rail line would reopen for unit-train transportation of aggregates from Texas Minerals' San Saba quarry.

== Operations ==
The CTXR interchanges with the BNSF Railway at Lometa. It primarily carries frac sand used in hydraulic fracturing.
