= Belton High School (Texas) =

Location
- 600 Lake Road; Belton, Bell County, Texas 76513; United States; 31.0871°N 97.4704°W

Information
- School type: Public, high school
- Motto: Every kid a winner
- Locale: Suburb: Small
- School district: Belton ISD
- NCES School ID: 480986000454
- Principal: Claudia Knox
- Teaching staff: 146.52 (on an FTE basis)
- Grades: 9–12
- Enrollment: 1,836 (2023–2024)
- Student to teacher ratio: 12.53
- Colors: Red & White
- Athletics conference: UIL Class 5A
- Team name: Tigers
- Yearbook: The Lair
- Website: bhs.bisd.net

Belton High School (BHS) is a public high school that serves the city of Belton, Texas, United States, parts of Bell County and classified as a 5A school by the University Interscholastic League (UIL). It is a part of the Belton Independent School District located in south central Bell County. During 2022–2023, Belton High School had an enrollment of 1,941 students and a student to teacher ratio of 12.35. The school received an overall rating of "B" from the Texas Education Agency for the 2024–2025 school year.

== Statistics ==
BHS's student information for the 2021–2022 school year:

- 7.0% African American
- 37.8% Hispanic
- 47.4% White
- 0.7% American Indian
- 1.7% Asian
- 0.4% Pacific Islander
- 4.9% Two or More Races

== Athletics ==
The Belton Tigers compete in:

- Baseball
- Basketball
- Cross Country
- Football
- Golf
- Powerlifting
- Soccer
- Softball
- Swimming
- Tennis
- Track and Field
- Volleyball

=== State Titles ===
- Baseball
  - 1994(4A)
- Boys Basketball
  - 1958(2A)
- Girls Golf
  - 1985(4A), 1988(4A)
- Boys Track
  - 1909(All)
- 2013 State Champion Individual Golfer, Andrew Paysse
- 1995-96 UIL 4A State Marching Band Contest Champions
- 2016 Magic Belles National Champions

== Rivalry with Temple ==
Belton's rival is the Temple High School Wildcats. This is most visible during the yearly Belton-Temple football game. The cities of Belton and Temple in the past have shared years of animosity towards each other, possibly from the founding of Temple by the Santa Fe Railroad.

This spilled over onto the football field during the 1920s and 1930s. It was not uncommon for fights to break out between fans in the parking lot after the game. After the 1936 game this almost turned deadly, with some involved hospitalized with minor to critical injuries. Given that the fights had increased in violence over the last three years and commerce between the two cities was starting to suffer a county judge made a decree that the two schools shall not play each other for a minimum of 50 years. The two schools would not meet again on the football field until 1995.

In general the rivalry is friendly in nature today. Custom shirts are usually printed up by both sides to mark the event. Pranks, small acts of vandalism and general mischief are a common occurrence in the week prior to the game, mostly minor in nature and perpetrated by the students involved in the games.

The first artificially-lighted football game played in the state of Texas was the 1921 Belton-Temple game played at Wildcat Field.

In 2009, the rivalry with Temple was nationally televised on ESPNU at Wildcat Stadium and the Tigers were victorious over Temple for the first time since 2005.

In 2013, the rivalry died in district play after Temple stayed at 5A and Belton moved up to 6A. However, the schools continued to meet in scrimmages in a variety of sports.

In 2016, the rivalry was renewed through a preseason matchup at Belton's Tiger Field. The Wildcats won 28–20, up from a 17–14 score at halftime.

In 2018, the Tigers faced off against the Wildcats at Wildcat Stadium. After a 3OT game, the Tigers went home with a 58–55 loss. Both teams went on to compete in the 2018 Texas High School State Playoffs.

== Stabbing incident ==
On the morning of May 3, 2022, an altercation between two students took place in one of the bathrooms on the school's campus. During this incident, one of the students was stabbed, prompting a lockdown of the school. The victim died at a local hospital and the alleged perpetrator fled the scene, but was apprehended by Belton police later that day and taken into custody. In 2025, perpetrator Caysen Allison was found guilty of criminally negligent homicide and assault with a deadly weapon, and was sentenced to ten years in prison.

== Notable alumni ==
- David Ash, former University of Texas football quarterback
- George Eads, television actor
- Robert Ford, former NFL wide receivers coach
- Logan Hall, NFL defensive tackle for the Houston Texans
- Khiry Robinson, running back for the New Orleans Saints
- Booker Russell, former NFL running back
- Ricky Sanders, former NFL wide receiver
- Durham Smythe, American football tight end for the Miami Dolphins
- Ramonce Taylor, former University of Texas football running back
- Henry T. Waskow, US Army Captain memorialized by Ernie Pyle
- Molly S. White (Class of 1976), Republican member of the Texas House of Representatives from Belton
- William Wilbanks, American criminologist, Texas High School Basketball Hall of Fame member
- Randy Winkler, former NFL offensive tackle
- Rudy Youngblood, actor
