= Moline, Texas =

- Unincorporated community
- Location within Texas Location within the United States
- Coordinates: 31°23′02″N 98°18′38″W
- Country: United States
- State: Texas
- Counties: Mills, Lampasas
- Elevation: 1,398 ft (426 m)
- Time zone: UTC-6 (Central (CST))
  - Summer (DST): UTC-5 (CDT)
- Area code: 325
- GNIS feature ID: 1380203

Moline is an unincorporated community in Lampasas and Mills counties in the U.S. state of Texas. According to the Handbook of Texas, the community had a population of 12 in 2000. It is located within the Killeen-Temple-Fort Hood metropolitan area.

== Education ==
Today, the community is served by the Star Independent School District.
