= Leon River =

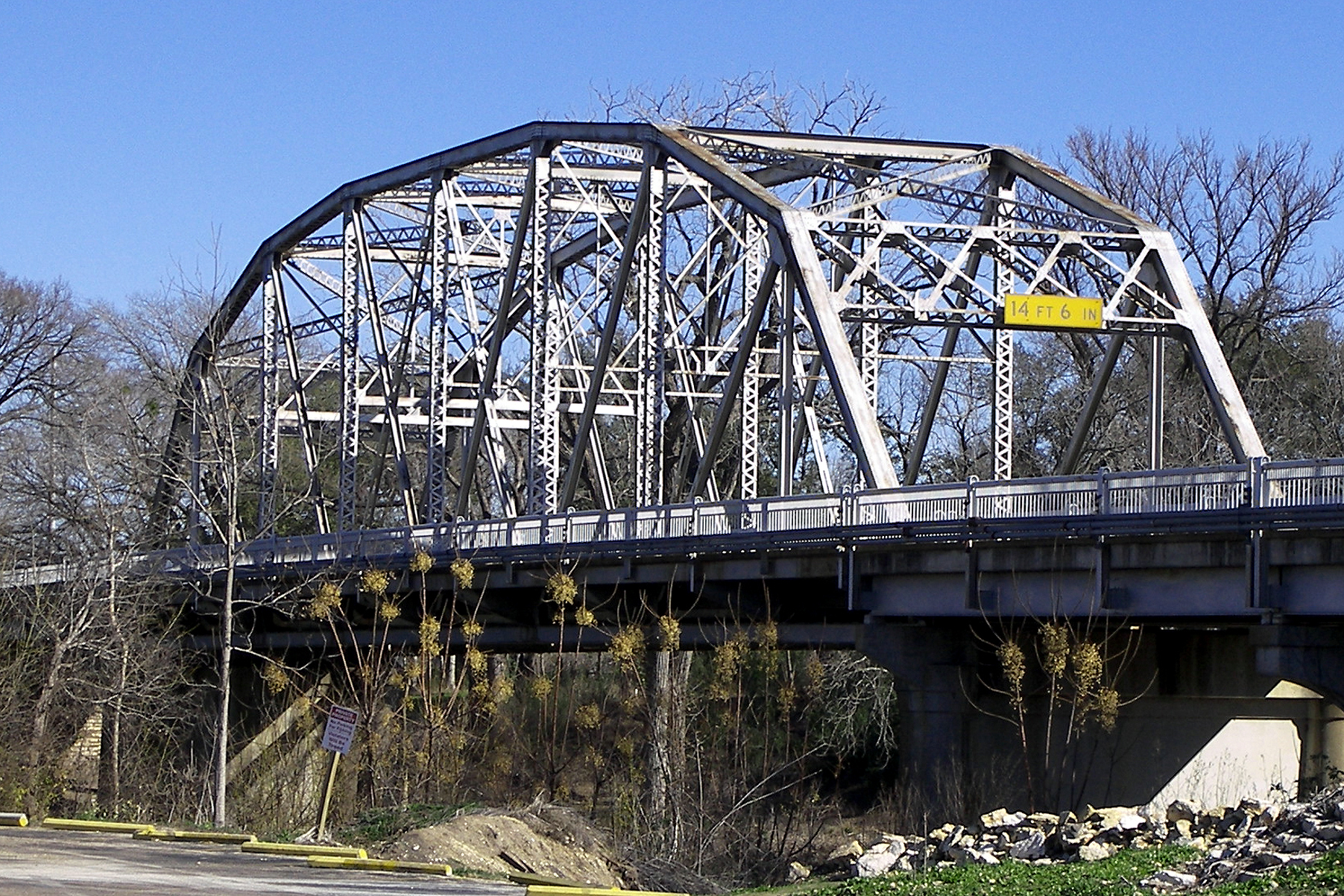
- A bridge over the Leon River in Belton

Location
- Country: United States

Physical characteristics
- Source
  - location: Texas
- Mouth: Little River
  - coordinates: 30.98436°N 97.40225°W

The Leon River is a river in the U.S. state of Texas. It has three primary forks - the North, Middle, and South Leon Rivers, which meet near Eastland and then run for around 185 miles (298 km) until it meets with the Lampasas River and the Salado Creek to form the Little River near Belton.

Tributaries include Pecan Creek and Cowhouse Creek in Hamilton County, Texas.

== Reservoirs ==
- Belton Lake
- Proctor Lake

== See also ==
- List of rivers of Texas
