= Adamsville, Texas =

- Unincorporated community
- Location within Texas
- Coordinates: 31°18′05″N 98°10′08″W
- Country: United States
- State: Texas
- County: Lampasas
- Elevation: 1,063 ft (324 m)
- Time zone: UTC-6 (Central (CST))
  - Summer (DST): UTC-5 (CDT)
- Area codes: 512 and 737
- GNIS feature ID: 1350883

Adamsville is an unincorporated community in Lampasas County, Texas, United States. According to the Handbook of Texas, the community had a population of 41 in 2000. It is located within the Killeen-Temple-Fort Hood metropolitan area.

== History ==
Adamsville was established around 1856. The population was 45 in 2010.

The John Patterson House in the community is on the National Register of Historic Places.

== Geography ==
Adamsville is located at the intersection of U.S. Route 281 and Farm to Market Road 581 on the Lampasas River, 16.5 mi (26.6 km) north of Lampasas in northern Lampasas County.

=== Climate ===
The climate in this area is characterized by hot, humid summers and generally mild to cool winters. According to the Köppen Climate Classification system, Adamsville has a humid subtropical climate, abbreviated "Cfa" on climate maps.

== Education ==
Straley's School was the first school built in Adamsville in 1885. A school in nearby Mount View was moved to Adamsville sometime after World War II. Today the community is served by the Lampasas Independent School District, with elementary-age kids going to Hanna Springs Elementary School.
