= William Wilbanks =

American criminologist and professor (1940–2018)

William Lee Wilbanks (May 30, 1940 - October 9, 2018) was an American criminologist and former professor of criminal justice at Florida International University.

== Education ==
Wilbanks graduated from Belton High School in Belton, Texas in 1958. At Belton High, he was an all-state guard on the State AA Championship basketball team that won the Class 2A championship in 1958. He went on to receive his B.A. from Abilene Christian College in 1963, after which he received his M.A.'s from Abilene Christian College, Sam Houston State University, and the University at Albany, SUNY in 1965, 1972, and 1972, respectively. In 1975, he received his Ph.D. in criminal justice from University at Albany, SUNY.

== Career ==
Wilbanks taught at Florida International University from 1973 to 1999, and has written over 20 books and 70 journal articles. In 2001, he returned to Belton to build the Belton High School Athletic Wall of Honor, which honors 72 of the school's athletes and five of its championship teams. Texas Tech University's Department of English awards the William Wilbanks Technical Communication Scholarship to some of its undergraduates who are technical communication majors, and who have GPAs of 3.0 or higher.

== Media appearances ==
From 1981 to 1997, Wilbanks appeared on television over 30 times as a criminology expert. These appearances included four on CNN's Crossfire and two on CBS' 60 Minutes. He appeared on multiple televised debates in which he argued that Prentice Rasheed, a shopkeeper in Dade County, Florida, should be indicted for setting a booby trap that killed a suspected burglar. Despite this, Rasheed was not indicted by the grand jury. After the jury made this decision, Wilbanks said, "People are thinking, if the police don't do the job, then I can do whatever I want. That's bad news. I don't think any of us wants to live in a booby-trapped society. A trap can't discriminate between a burglar, a fireman, a policeman or the Amway lady."

== Bibliography ==
- 1987: The Myth of a Racist Criminal Justice System ISBN 0-534-06816-2
