= Lampasas River =

Location
- Country: United States

Physical characteristics
- Source
  - location: Texas
- Mouth: Little River
  - coordinates: 30.98436°N 97.40225°W
- Length: 84 miles

The Lampasas River (/læmˈpæsəs/ lam-PASS-əs) is a river in the U.S. state of Texas. It originates near the city of Hamilton and travels southeast for about 84 miles through Lampasas, Burnet, and Bell Counties in central Texas.

After the first 75 miles it enters Stillhouse Hollow Lake, a man-made reservoir. The river continues for nine miles after the lake to converge with the Leon River near Belton, forming the Little River (Texas).

The Lampasas River is the northern- and westernmost river in the natural range of the American alligator. In June 2015, two men were arrested for shooting and killing an alligator that they found on the river.

== See also ==
- List of rivers of Texas
- Lampasas, Texas
