= Belton Lake =

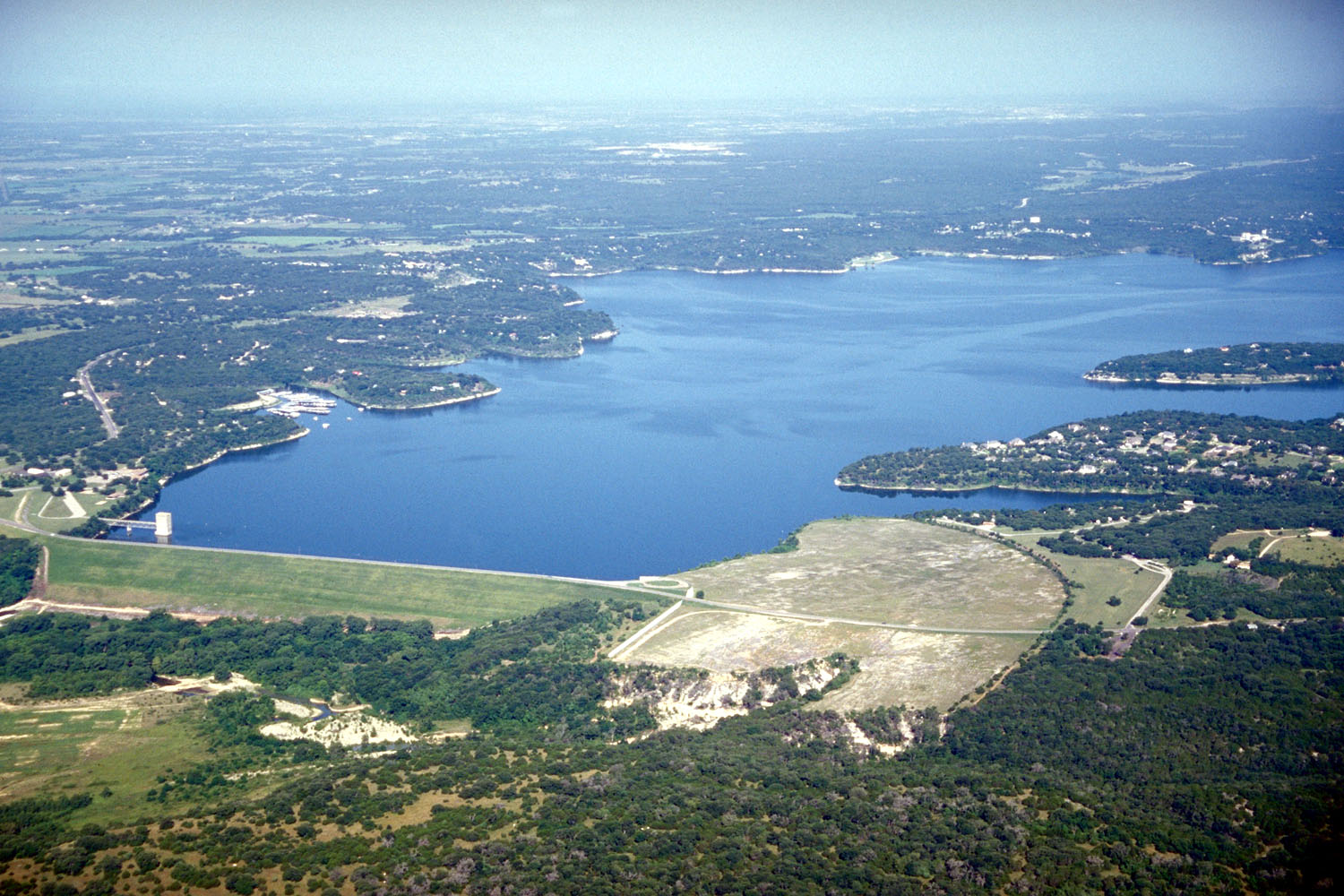
- Belton Dam and the lake

- Location within Texas Location within the United States
- Location: Bell and Coryell counties, 5 mi (8 km) northwest of Belton, Texas
- Coordinates: 31°06′31″N 97°28′21″W
- Type: Flood control reservoir
- Primary inflows: Leon River
- Primary outflows: Leon River
- Basin countries: United States
- Surface area: 12,385 acres (50.12 km^{2})
- Max. depth: 124 ft (38 m)
- Water volume: 435,000 acre⋅ft (0.537 km^{3})
- Surface elevation: 594 ft (181 m)

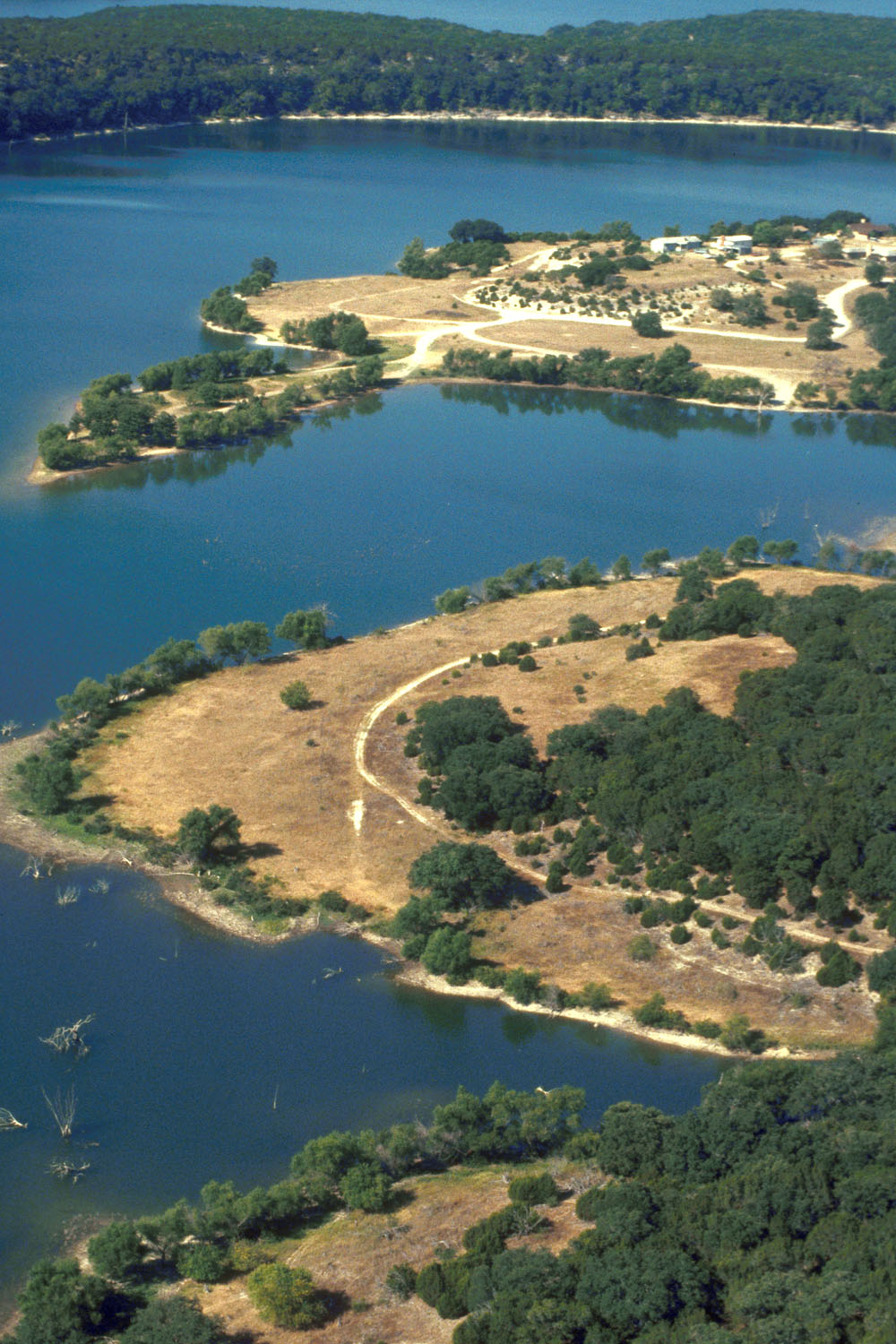
A small part of Belton lake and the lakeshore. Belton Lake is a long, narrow, winding lake with many curves and coves.

Belton Lake is a U.S. Army Corps of Engineers reservoir on the Leon River in the Brazos River basin, 5 miles (8 km) northwest of Belton, Texas, United States. The lake extends into both Bell County and Coryell County. Belton Dam and the lake are both managed by the Fort Worth District of the U.S. Army Corps of Engineers. The reservoir was officially impounded in 1954, and serves to provide flood control and drinking water for Belton, Temple, and the surrounding communities. Belton Lake is a popular recreational destination.

Belton Lake overflowed the spillway in 1991–1992 with the occurrence of two closely spaced 50 year floods. The area immediately below the spillway was heavily damaged by the floods. It was rebuilt and reconstituted as the Miller Springs Nature Center on October 26, 1993. It is run by the Miller Springs Alliance, a non profit group of volunteers and has nearly 11 miles of hiking and biking trails passing through upland, prairie, canyon and riparian habitats.

== Fish populations ==
Belton Lake has been stocked with species of fish intended to improve the utility of the reservoir for recreational fishing. Fish present in Belton Lake include largemouth bass, smallmouth bass, striped bass, catfish, bluegills, and minnows.

== Recreational uses ==
In addition to maintaining the dam that creates the reservoir, the U.S. Army Corps of Engineers maintains recreational facilities at the lake, including Live Oak Ridge Park, Cedar Ridge Park, Winkler Park, White Flint Park, and Westcliff Park. Under the auspices of the U.S. Army Corps of Engineers the Miller Springs Alliance oversees the Miller Springs Nature Center located adjacent to Belton Dam. Boating and fishing are very popular. The Girl Scouts' Camp Kachina is on the shores of the lake.

== Murders of Todd and Stacie Bagley ==
In 1999, Christian Youth Ministers Todd and Stacie Bagley were car-jacked by a gang and driven to the lake recreation area where they were both shot in the head and their vehicle set on fire. Two gang members convicted of the murders were executed in 2020.
