= Stillhouse Hollow Lake =

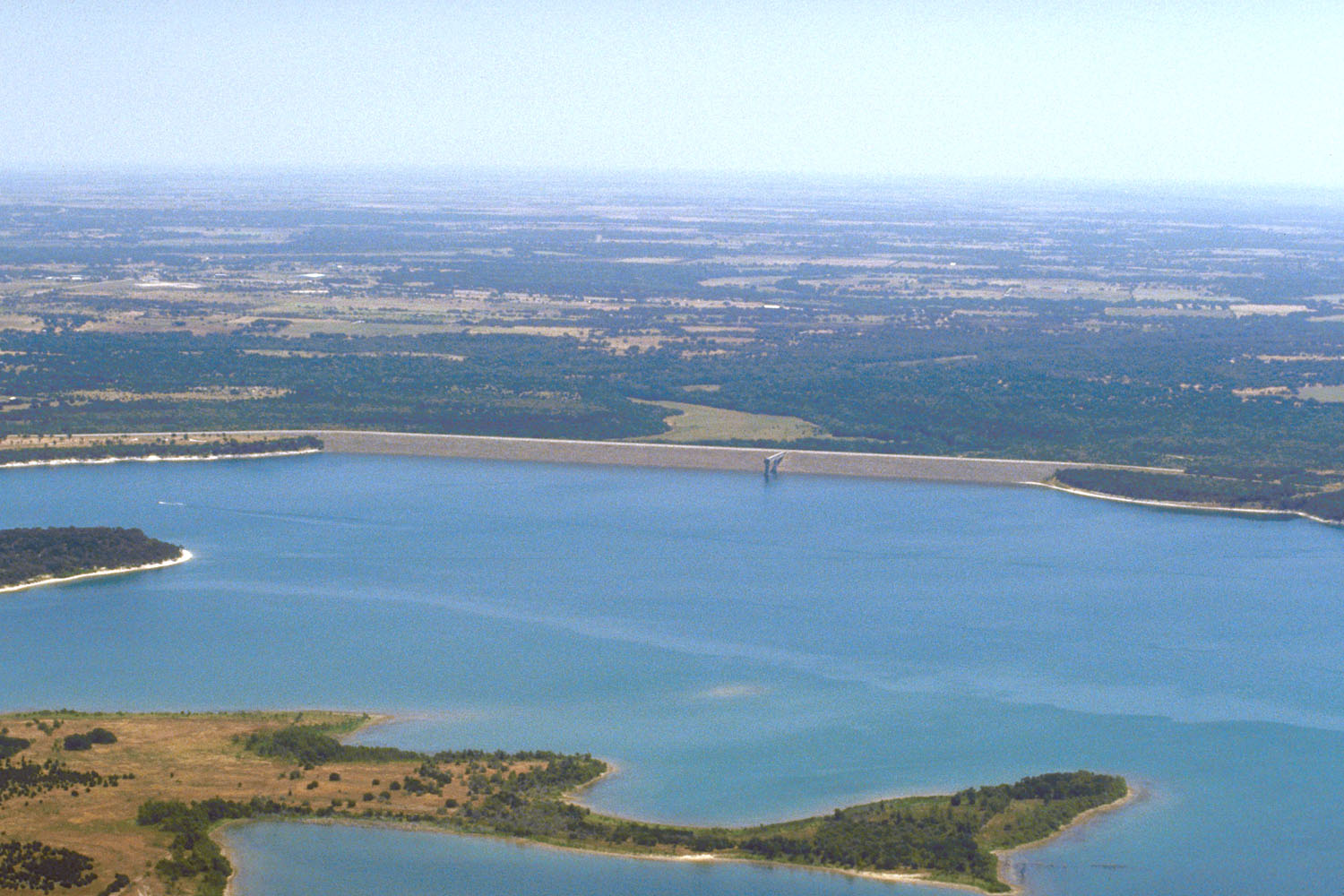
- Stillhouse Hollow Lake and Dam

- Location within Texas Location within the United States
- Location: Bell County, southwest of Belton, Texas
- Coordinates: 31°01′24″N 97°31′51″W
- Type: Flood control reservoir
- Primary inflows: Lampasas River
- Primary outflows: Lampasas River
- Basin countries: United States
- Surface area: 6,429 acres (2,602 ha)
- Max. depth: 107 ft (33 m)
- Water volume: 235,700 acre⋅ft (0.2907 km^{3})
- Surface elevation: 622 ft (190 m)

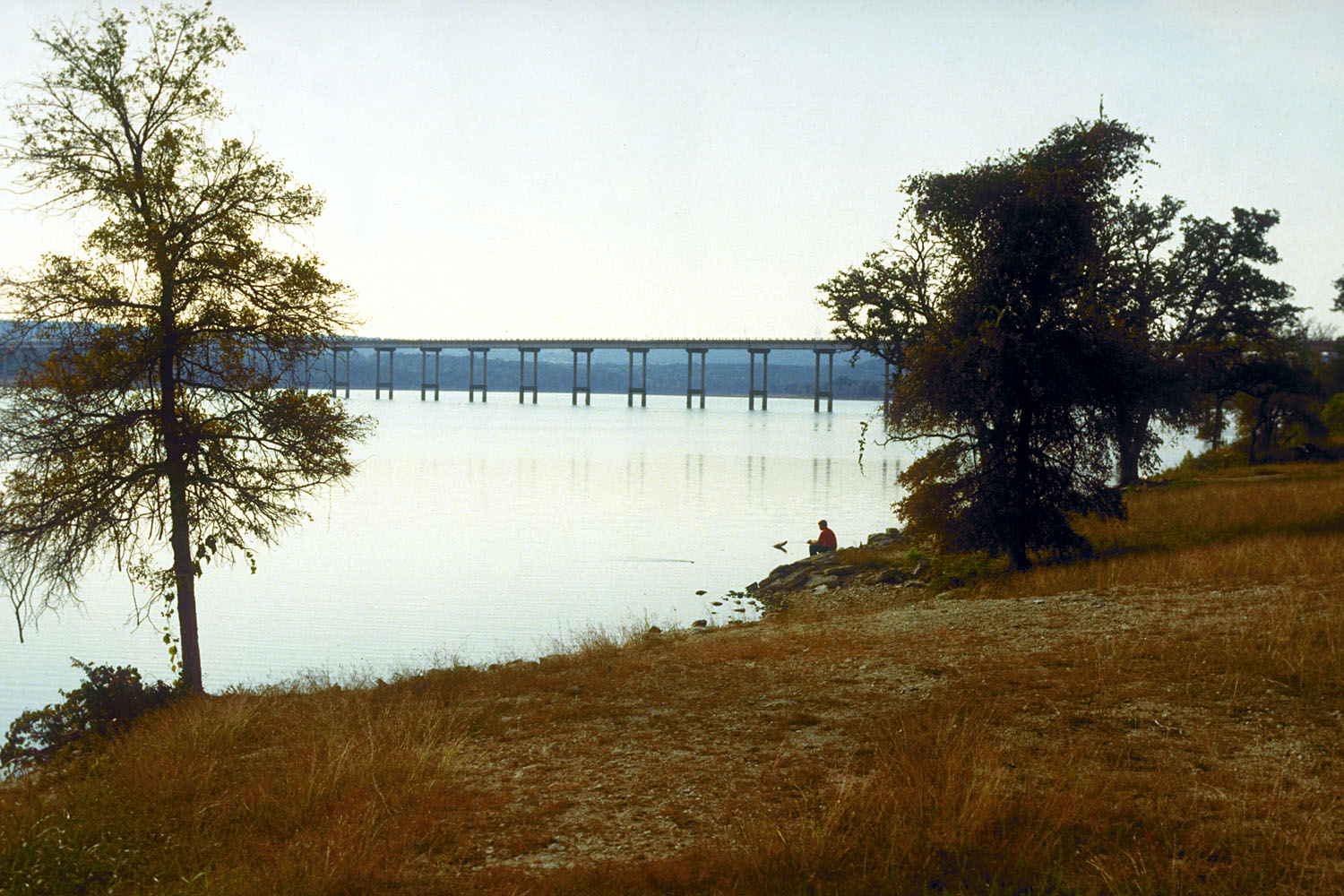
Stillhouse Hollow Lake, near the upper end of the lake. The bridge carries Farm to Market Road 3481 across the lake.

Stillhouse Hollow Lake is a U.S. Army Corps of Engineers reservoir on the Lampasas River in the Brazos River basin, 5 miles (8 km) southwest of Belton, Texas, United States. Stillhouse Hollow Dam and the reservoir are both managed by the Fort Worth District of the U.S. Army Corps of Engineers. The reservoir was officially impounded in 1968, and serves to provide flood control for the communities downstream. The lake also functions as a water supply for several of the surrounding communities. Stillhouse Hollow Lake is a popular recreational destination.

Stillhouse Hollow Lake is also commonly known as Stillhouse Hollow Reservoir.

Due to the extraordinary drought condition in Central Texas, Stillhouse Hollow experienced the lowest ever recorded lake level in 2011, significantly exceeding its prior minimum of 610 ft set in 1989. At the close of 2011, the level of the lake stood at just over 605 ft.

== Fish populations ==
Stillhouse Hollow Lake has been stocked with species of fish intended to improve the utility of the reservoir for recreational fishing. Fish present in Stillhouse Hollow Lake include largemouth bass, smallmouth bass, white bass, catfish, and crappie.

== Recreational uses ==
In addition to maintaining the dam that creates the reservoir, the U.S. Army Corps of Engineers maintains recreational facilities at the lake. Dana Peak Park and Union Grove Park are both developed US Army Corps of Engineers parks open to the public. Boating and fishing are very popular.
