= Ricky Sanders =

American football player (born 1962)

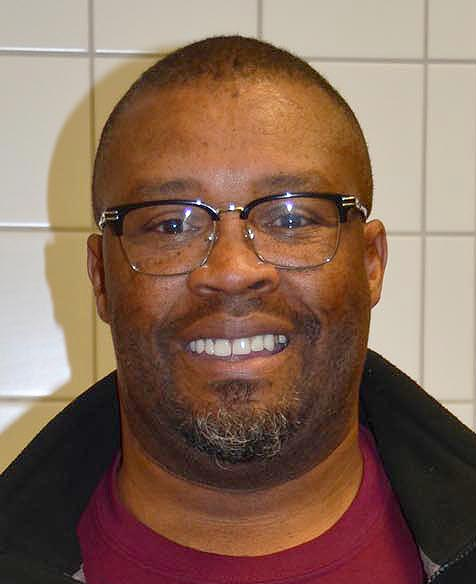
- Sanders in 2018

No. 46, 83, 80
- Position: Wide receiver

Personal information
- Born: September 30, 1962 (age 64); Temple, Texas, U.S.
- Listed height: 5 ft 11 in (1.80 m)
- Listed weight: 180 lb (82 kg)

Career information
- High school: Belton (Belton, Texas)
- College: Texas State (1980–1983)
- Supplemental draft: 1984: 1st round, 16th overall pick

Career history
- Houston Gamblers (1984–1985); Washington Redskins (1986–1993); Atlanta Falcons (1994); Miami Dolphins (1995); Atlanta Falcons (1995)

Awards and highlights
- 2× Super Bowl champion (XXII, XXVI); Washington Commanders 90 Greatest; 2× Division II national champion (1981, 1982)

Career NFL statistics
- Receptions: 483
- Receiving yards: 6,477
- Receiving touchdowns: 37
- Stats at Pro Football Reference

Ricky Wayne Sanders (born August 30, 1962) is an American former professional football player who was a wide receiver for 12 seasons from 1983 to 1994, two with the United States Football League (USFL)'s Houston Gamblers and 10 in the National Football League (NFL) (eight seasons with the Washington Redskins and two with the Atlanta Falcons). He played running back, safety, and place kicker (on kickoffs) as a three-year letterman for Belton High School in Belton, Texas, and broke five records.

== Football career ==
Sanders was a three-sport star at Belton High School in Belton, Texas. He made all-region in basketball, placed in three events in the state track meet, and won accolades as a running back. Although recruited by numerous major colleges—including Michigan, UCLA, and Texas Tech, among many others—his junior year, he did not attend any of them. A string of injuries his senior football season may have been a contributing factor.

Sanders played college football at Texas State University as a running back, helping the team win the Division II national championship in 1981 and 1982. He graduated in 1983 with 2,461 rushing yards and 3,126 all-purpose yards. In 2018, he was selected for the school's athletic hall of fame.

He played two seasons in the United States Football League for the Houston Gamblers and teamed with Jim Kelly making 101 receptions for 1,370 yards and 11 touchdowns. Sanders had been drafted by the New England Patriots in the 1984 NFL Supplemental Draft of USFL and CFL Players. New England traded his rights to the Washington Redskins. The Redskins had two talented receivers in the sure handed Art Monk and tough Gary Clark but felt they needed a legitimate deep threat, leading them to acquire the speedy Sanders. The three were the first trio of wide receivers to each surpass 1,000 receiving yards in a single season, and became known as "The Posse."

Sanders made only 14 catches in 1986, his first NFL season, but proved he was a deep threat averaging 20.4 yards per catch. His next season was better, as he snatched 34 passes from new starting quarterback Jay Schroeder. After Schroeder's eventual ouster at quarterback, his replacement, Doug Williams, loved Sanders's speed and ability to run after the catch and went to him often. This duo was effective and the Redskins fought their way through the playoffs and into the Super Bowl.

Sanders was a standout performer in Super Bowl XXII, catching nine passes for 193 yards and two touchdowns, while also returning three kickoffs for 46 yards. He set outright Super Bowl records for most receiving yards (193), most total yards (235), most receiving yards in one quarter (168), and tied the records for most touchdowns in one quarter (2) and longest touchdown reception (80 yards) in Washington's 42–10 win over the Denver Broncos. As of 2026, his record for receiving yards in a quarter still stands, and he remains the only player in Super Bowl history to have scored two receiving touchdowns of 40 yards or more in the same game. Shortly after the Super Bowl win, when the Redskins visited the White House, President Ronald Reagan completed a ceremonial pass to Sanders.

Sanders had arguably his best season in 1988, as he finished fifth in the NFL on receiving yards with 1,148 and second in receiving touchdowns with 12, a Redskins record. The following season was also a good one for Sanders as he made 80 grabs for 1,138 yards, making him one of three 1,000-yard receivers on the team along with Monk and Clark. Sanders' numbers fell off slightly in 1990, to 56 catches for 727 yards.

In the 1991 season, Sanders made 45 catches for 580 yards. The Redskins defeated the Atlanta Falcons and Detroit Lions before beating the Buffalo Bills in Super Bowl XXVI. This was Sanders' second Super Bowl victory, his first having come four years prior, in Super Bowl XXII.

In June 1990, Sanders was accused of hitting a parking attendant with his car outside a Houston nightclub. He was ultimately acquitted in February 1991, but admitted that the whole ordeal weighed heavily on his mind throughout the 1990 season. Washington drafted top Heisman trophy winning receiver Desmond Howard but he could not unseat Sanders. When Gibbs retired there were coaching and quarterback changes in Washington and Sanders became a free agent after the 1993 season. He signed with the Atlanta Falcons prior to the 1994 season, and played two seasons with them: 1994 and 1995. Sanders signed with the Miami Dolphins after the 1995 season but never played a game with them.

Sanders finished his 10 NFL seasons with 483 receptions for 6,477 yards and 37 touchdowns. He also rushed for 94 yards and one touchdown, returned two punts for 12 yards, and gained 636 yards on 33 kickoff returns.

== NFL career statistics ==
Legend
	Super Bowl champion
	Led the league
**Bold**	Career high

=== Regular season ===
Year	Team	Games		Receiving				
Year	Team	GP	GS	Rec	Yds	Avg	Lng	TD
1986	WAS	10	3	14	286	**20.4**	**71**	2
1987	WAS	12	5	37	630	17.0	57	3
1988	WAS	**16**	4	73	**1,148**	15.7	55	**12**
1989	WAS	**16**	**12**	**80**	1,138	14.2	68	4
1990	WAS	**16**	6	56	727	13.0	38	3
1991	WAS	**16**	7	45	580	12.9	45	5
1992	WAS	15	5	51	707	13.9	62	3
1993	WAS	**16**	11	58	638	11.0	50	4
1994	ATL	14	**12**	67	599	8.9	28	1
1995	ATL	3	1	2	24	12.0	21	0
Career		134	66	483	6,477	13.4	71	37
