= Lampasas County, Texas =

County in Texas, United States

- County
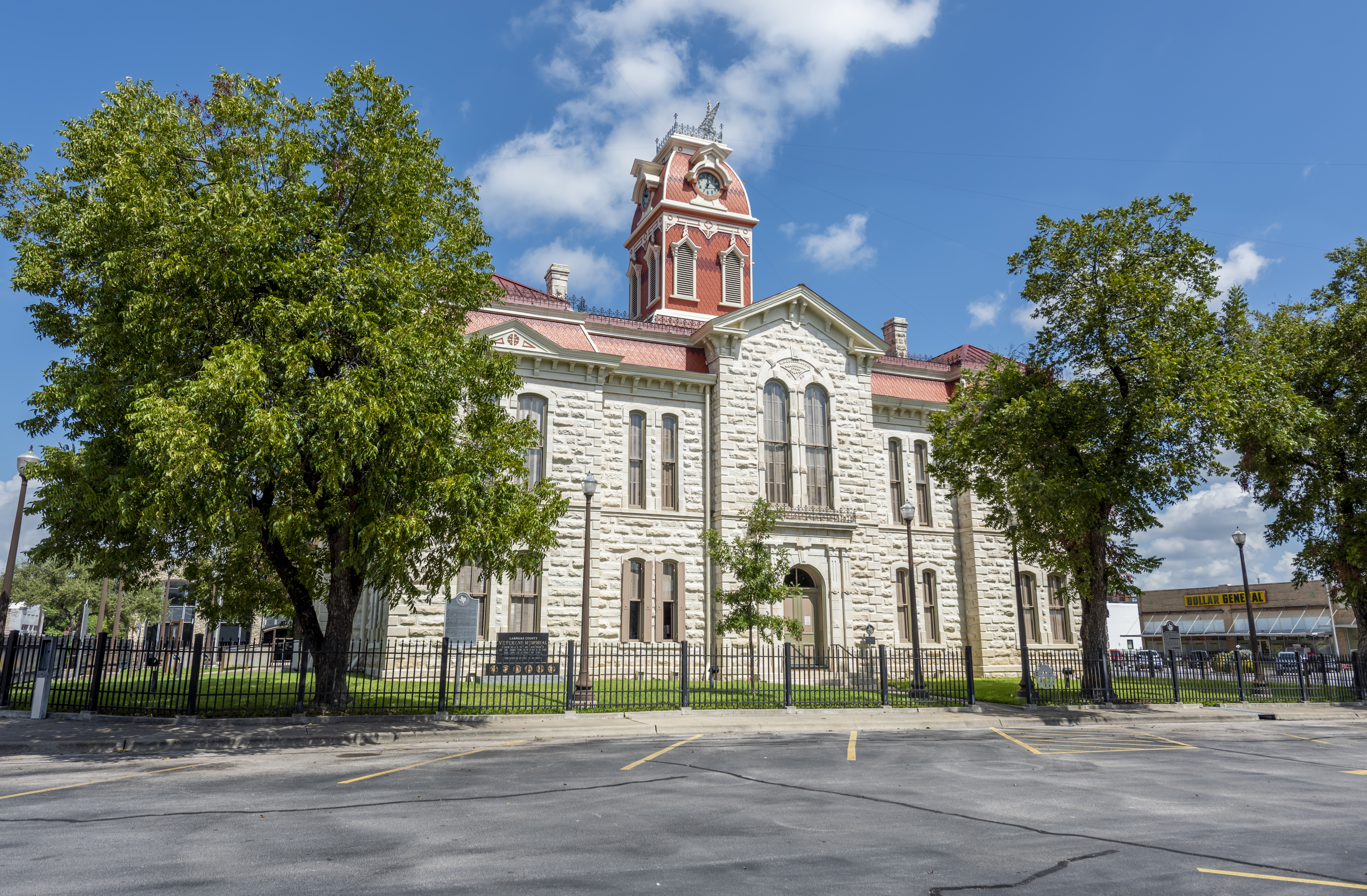
- The Lampasas County Courthouse was completed in 1884. The structure was added to the National Register of Historic Places on June 21, 1971.

- Location within the U.S. state of Texas
- Coordinates: 31°11′N 98°14′W
- Country: United States
- State: Texas
- Founded: 1856
- Named for: Lampasas River
- Seat: Lampasas
- Largest city: Lampasas

Area
  - Total: 714 sq mi (1,850 km^{2})
  - Land: 713 sq mi (1,850 km^{2})
  - Water: 1.1 sq mi (2.8 km^{2}) 0.2%

Population (2020)
  - Total: 21,627
  - Estimate (2025): 23,657 ▲
  - Density: 30.3/sq mi (11.7/km^{2})
- Time zone: UTC−6 (Central)
  - Summer (DST): UTC−5 (CDT)
- Congressional district: 11th
- Website: www.co.lampasas.tx.us

Lampasas County (/læmˈpæsəs/ lam-PASS-əs) is a county located on the Edwards Plateau in the U.S. state of Texas. As of the 2020 census, its population was 21,627. Its county seat is Lampasas. The county is named for the Lampasas River. Lampasas County is part of the Killeen-Temple-Fort Hood metropolitan area.

== History ==
Indigenous peoples were the first inhabitants of the area. Later known tribes in the area included Tonkawa, Lipan Apache, and Comanche. The Aguayo expedition is said to have passed through the county in 1721. In 1756, a presidio was established by Don Pedro de Terreros with the assistance of elements of the Spanish Army, at the confluence of Lucy Creek and Arroya Cavalto. The effort was abandoned not long after, but the site remained as a base of operations by Thomas Isaac Cox, a member of Terreros' original expedition, for the purpose of obtaining hundreds of Texas mustangs for use by the Continental Army during the American Revolutionary War.

In 1853, Moses Hughes and his invalid wife, Hannah (Berry), became the first permanent settlers, seeking to take advantage of the medicinal springs. John Patterson was the first man to cultivate land in the county, in 1854. In 1855, Elizabeth and George W. Scott laid out the town of Burleson, named for her father. The town was renamed Lampasas, when it became the county seat; the Sixth Texas Legislature formed Lampasas County, named after the Lampasas River, from parts of Travis, Bell, and Coryell Counties, in 1856. In 1858 The northeastern corner of Lampasas County became part of Hamilton County. In 1887 Mills County received northern and northwestern sections of Lampasas County.

The Lampasas Guards were organized to ward off Indian attacks in 1859. Indian raids increased in 1861, as able-bodied men were off fighting in the war.

In 1872 Townsen's Mill was built by Perry and Jasper Townsen. This steam mill cut "rawhide" lumber and ground wheat and corn. Henry A. Chadwick and son Milam built a sawmill, flour mill, and cotton gin in 1874. In 1875, the Farmers' Alliance was formed in Lampasas in reaction against the cattle rustling and illegal land dealings prevalent in the county. A gunfight occurred at the Lampasas Saloon in 1877.

In 1882, the Gulf, Colorado and Santa Fe Railway extended its line west from Belton to Lampasas. The Texas Power and Light Company arrived in Lampasas County in the 1920s, and in 1934 the Lower Colorado River Authority brought electricity to the county. Lone Star Gas established services in the county in 1949.

During World War II in 1942, Fort Hood opened as a military training base. Hancock Park in Lampasas was temporarily turned over to the troops as a recreational area.

In July of 2025, a major flood of the Lampasas River happened due to heavy rain upriver. The river level went from around 10 feet to a "major flood stage" of 33 feet. Numerous businesses were damaged, including Hancock Park and Thirsty Penguin. The Boy Scouts ferry system that was set up in that park was completely swept away. Evacuations in RV parks in the city of Kempner were mandatory.

== Geography ==
According to the U.S. Census Bureau, the county has a total area of 714 sq mi (1,850 km^{2}), of which 1.1 sq mi (2.8 km^{2}) (0.2%) is covered by water.

=== Major highways ===
- U.S. Highway 183
- U.S. Highway 190
- U.S. Highway 281
- Loop 257

=== Adjacent counties ===
- Hamilton County (north)
- Coryell County (northeast)
- Bell County (southeast)
- Burnet County (south)
- San Saba County (west)
- Mills County (northwest)

== Demographics ==
Historical population
Census	Pop.	Note	%±
1860	1,028		—
1870	1,344		30.7%
1880	5,421		303.3%
1890	7,584		39.9%
1900	8,625		13.7%
1910	9,532		10.5%
1920	8,800		−7.7%
1930	8,677		−1.4%
1940	9,167		5.6%
1950	9,929		8.3%
1960	9,418		−5.1%
1970	9,323		−1.0%
1980	12,005		28.8%
1990	13,521		12.6%
2000	17,762		31.4%
2010	19,677		10.8%
2020	21,627		9.9%
2025 (est.)	23,657	▲	9.4%
U.S. Decennial Census; 1850–2010 2010 2020

=== Racial and ethnic composition ===
Lampasas County, Texas – Racial and ethnic composition Note: the US Census treats Hispanic/Latino as an ethnic category. This table excludes Latinos from the racial categories and assigns them to a separate category. Hispanics/Latinos may be of any race.
Race / Ethnicity (NH = Non-Hispanic)	Pop 1980	Pop 1990	Pop 2000	Pop 2010	Pop 2020	% 1980	% 1990	% 2000	% 2010	% 2020
White alone (NH)	10,413	11,321	14,121	14,836	15,132	86.74%	83.73%	79.50%	75.40%	69.97%
Black or African American alone (NH)	158	241	511	581	700	1.32%	1.78%	2.88%	2.95%	3.24%
Native American or Alaska Native alone (NH)	29	71	88	127	115	0.24%	0.53%	0.50%	0.65%	0.53%
Asian alone (NH)	101	126	126	184	242	0.84%	0.93%	0.71%	0.94%	1.12%
Native Hawaiian or Pacific Islander alone (NH)	x	x	8	35	86	x	x	0.05%	0.18%	0.40%
Other race alone (NH)	20	9	8	31	100	0.17%	0.07%	0.05%	0.16%	0.46%
Mixed race or Multiracial (NH)	x	x	223	440	1,073	x	x	1.26%	2.24%	4.96%
Hispanic or Latino (any race)	1,284	1,753	2,677	3,443	4,179	10.70%	12.97%	15.07%	17.50%	19.32%
Total	12,005	13,521	17,762	19,677	21,627	100.00%	100.00%	100.00%	100.00%	100.00%

=== 2020 census ===
As of the 2020 census, the county had a population of 21,627. The median age was 44.7 years; 22.1% of residents were under 18 and 21.2% were 65 or older. For every 100 females, there were 98.1 males, and for every 100 females 18 and over, there were 96.7 males.

The racial makeup of the county was 75.5% White, 3.4% Black or African American, 1.1% Native American and Alaska Native, 1.2% Asian, 0.4% Pacific Islander, 6.2% from some other race, and 12.2% from two or more races. Hispanic and Latino Americans of any race comprised 19.3% of the population.

About 33.9% of residents lived in urban areas, while 66.1% lived in rural areas.

Of the 8,486 households in the county, 29.6% had children under 18 living in them. Of all households, 54.9% were married-couple households, 16.9% were households with a single male householder, and 22.8% were households with a female householder with no husband present. About 24.5% of all households were made up of individuals, and 12.6% had someone living alone who was 65 or older.

Of the 9,704 housing units, 12.6% were vacant. Among occupied housing units, 74.1% were owner-occupied and 25.9% were renter-occupied. The homeowner vacancy rate was 1.9% and the rental vacancy rate was 5.7%.

=== 2000 census ===
As of the 2000 census, 17,762 people, 6,554 households, and 4,876 families were residing in the county. The population density was 25 people/mi^{2} (9.7 people/km^{2}). The 7,601 housing units averaged 11 units per square mile (4.2 units/km^{2}). The racial makeup of the county was 86.75% White, 3.10% African American, 0.70% Native American, 0.75% Asian, 6.55% from other races, and 2.15% from two or more races. About 15.07% of the population was Hispanic or Latino of any race.

Of the 6,554 households, 35.10% had children under 18 living with them, 60.70% were married couples living together, 9.50% had a female householder with no husband present, and 25.60% were not families. About 21.90% of all households were made up of individuals, and 10.50% had someone living alone who was 65 years of age or older. The average household size was 2.66, and the average family size was 3.08.

In the county, age distribution was 27.6% under 18, 7.7% from 18 to 24, 27.2% from 25 to 44, 23.0% from 45 to 64, and 14.5% who were 65 or older. The median age was 37 years. For every 100 females, there were 96.3 males. For every 100 females age 18 and over, there were 93.3 males.

The median income for a household in the county was $36,176 and for a family was $41,395. Males had a median income of $30,320 versus $20,637 for females. The per capita income for the county was $17,184. About 10.7% of families and 14.1% of the population were below the poverty line, including 18.7% of those under 18 and 14.8% of those 65 or over.

== Communities ==
=== Cities ===
- Copperas Cove (mostly in Coryell County)
- Lampasas (county seat)
- Lometa

=== Unincorporated communities ===
- Adamsville
- Bend (partly in San Saba County)
- Izoro
- Moline (partly in Mills County)
- Nix
- Rumley

=== Ghost town ===
- Senterfitt

== Politics ==
United States presidential election results for Lampasas County, Texas
Year	Republican		Democratic		Third party(ies)	
Year	No.	%	No.	%	No.	%
1912	81	10.42%	654	84.17%	42	5.41%
1916	113	11.36%	848	85.23%	34	3.42%
1920	227	16.84%	778	57.72%	343	25.45%
1924	228	12.35%	1,596	86.46%	22	1.19%
1928	899	60.91%	567	38.41%	10	0.68%
1932	120	6.17%	1,824	93.83%	0	0.00%
1936	134	8.38%	1,462	91.43%	3	0.19%
1940	244	10.84%	2,006	89.12%	1	0.04%
1944	212	10.26%	1,693	81.95%	161	7.79%
1948	276	15.27%	1,459	80.74%	72	3.98%
1952	1,478	55.21%	1,199	44.79%	0	0.00%
1956	1,308	53.45%	1,134	46.34%	5	0.20%
1960	1,222	46.84%	1,372	52.59%	15	0.57%
1964	744	25.05%	2,224	74.88%	2	0.07%
1968	935	33.18%	1,423	50.50%	460	16.32%
1972	2,251	76.33%	688	23.33%	10	0.34%
1976	1,563	39.25%	2,376	59.67%	43	1.08%
1980	2,323	53.02%	1,979	45.17%	79	1.80%
1984	3,285	70.60%	1,356	29.14%	12	0.26%
1988	3,000	60.41%	1,954	39.35%	12	0.24%
1992	2,233	43.07%	1,508	29.08%	1,444	27.85%
1996	3,008	56.10%	1,819	33.92%	535	9.98%
2000	4,526	72.84%	1,569	25.25%	119	1.92%
2004	5,422	77.18%	1,593	22.68%	10	0.14%
2008	5,651	74.02%	1,903	24.93%	80	1.05%
2012	5,621	78.03%	1,479	20.53%	104	1.44%
2016	6,385	77.82%	1,483	18.07%	337	4.11%
2020	8,086	77.76%	2,144	20.62%	169	1.63%
2024	8,961	79.29%	2,232	19.75%	108	0.96%

United States Senate election results for Lampasas County, Texas1
Year	Republican		Democratic		Third party(ies)	
Year	No.	%	No.	%	No.	%
2024	8,606	76.92%	2,314	20.68%	268	2.40%

United States Senate election results for Lampasas County, Texas2
Year	Republican		Democratic		Third party(ies)	
Year	No.	%	No.	%	No.	%
2020	8,102	78.43%	1,978	19.15%	250	2.42%

Texas Gubernatorial election results for Lampasas County
Year	Republican		Democratic		Third party(ies)	
Year	No.	%	No.	%	No.	%
2022	6,625	80.29%	1,502	18.20%	124	1.50%

== Education ==
School districts include:

- Evant Independent School District
- Goldthwaite Consolidated Independent School District
- Lampasas Independent School District
- Lometa Independent School District

All of Lampasas County is in the service area of Central Texas College.

== See also ==
- List of museums in Central Texas
- National Register of Historic Places listings in Lampasas County, Texas
- Recorded Texas Historic Landmarks in Lampasas County
