= Kempner, Texas =

- City
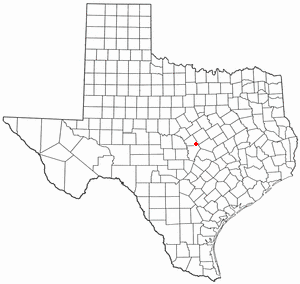
- Location of Kempner, Texas

- Coordinates: 31°04′40″N 97°58′57″W
- Country: United States
- State: Texas
- County: Lampasas

Area
  - Total: 2.05 sq mi (5.32 km^{2})
  - Land: 2.05 sq mi (5.32 km^{2})
  - Water: 0 sq mi (0.00 km^{2})
- Elevation: 1,020 ft (310 m)

Population (2020)
  - Total: 1,146
  - Density: 558/sq mi (215/km^{2})
- Time zone: UTC-6 (Central (CST))
  - Summer (DST): UTC-5 (CDT)
- ZIP code: 76539
- Area code: 254 512
- FIPS code: 48-38800
- GNIS feature ID: 2410177
- Website: kempnertx.gov

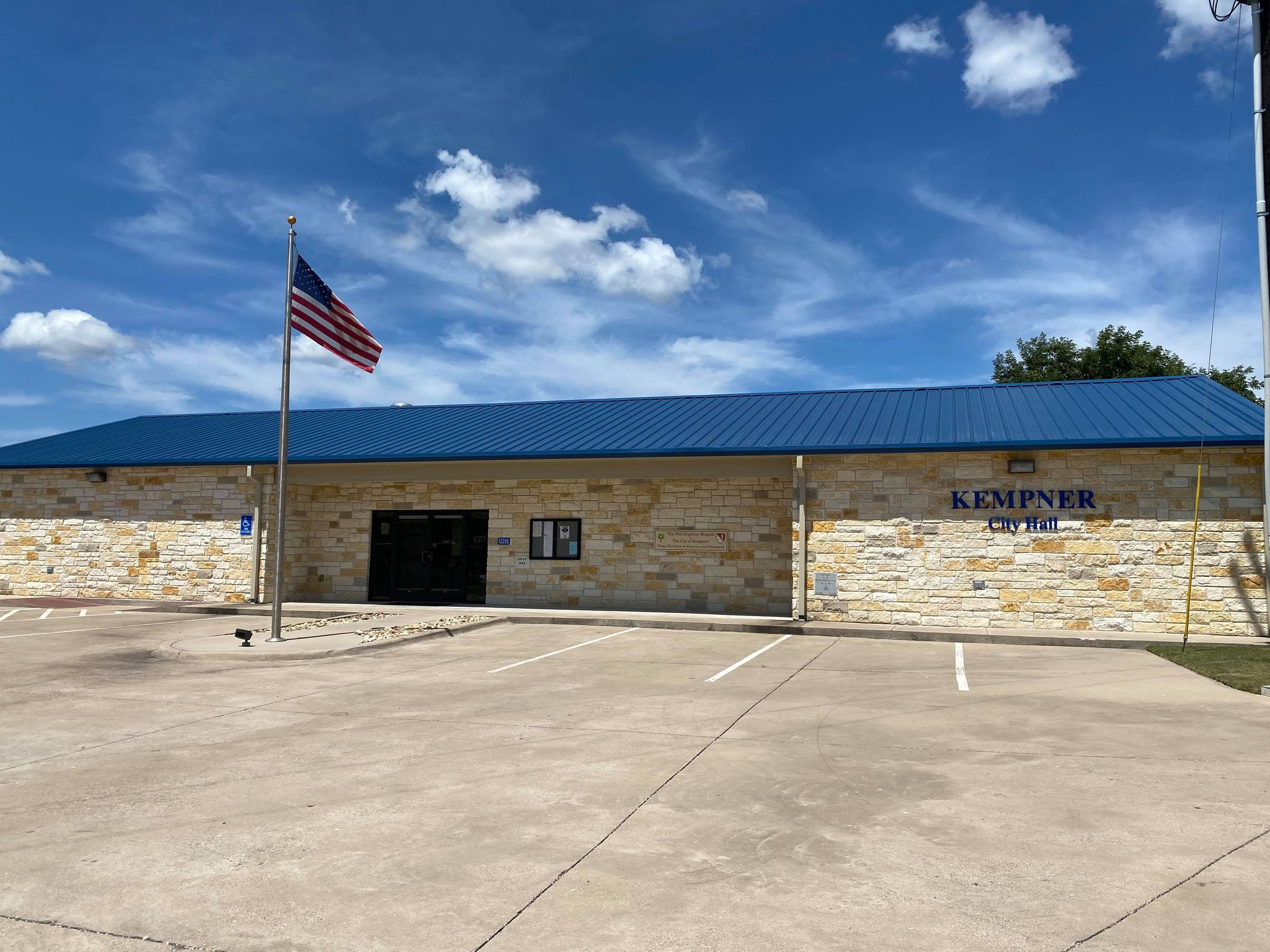
Kempner City Hall on 8/13/2021

Kempner is a city in Lampasas County, Texas, United States. The population was 1,146 at the 2020 census. It is part of the Killeen–Temple–Fort Hood Metropolitan Statistical Area.

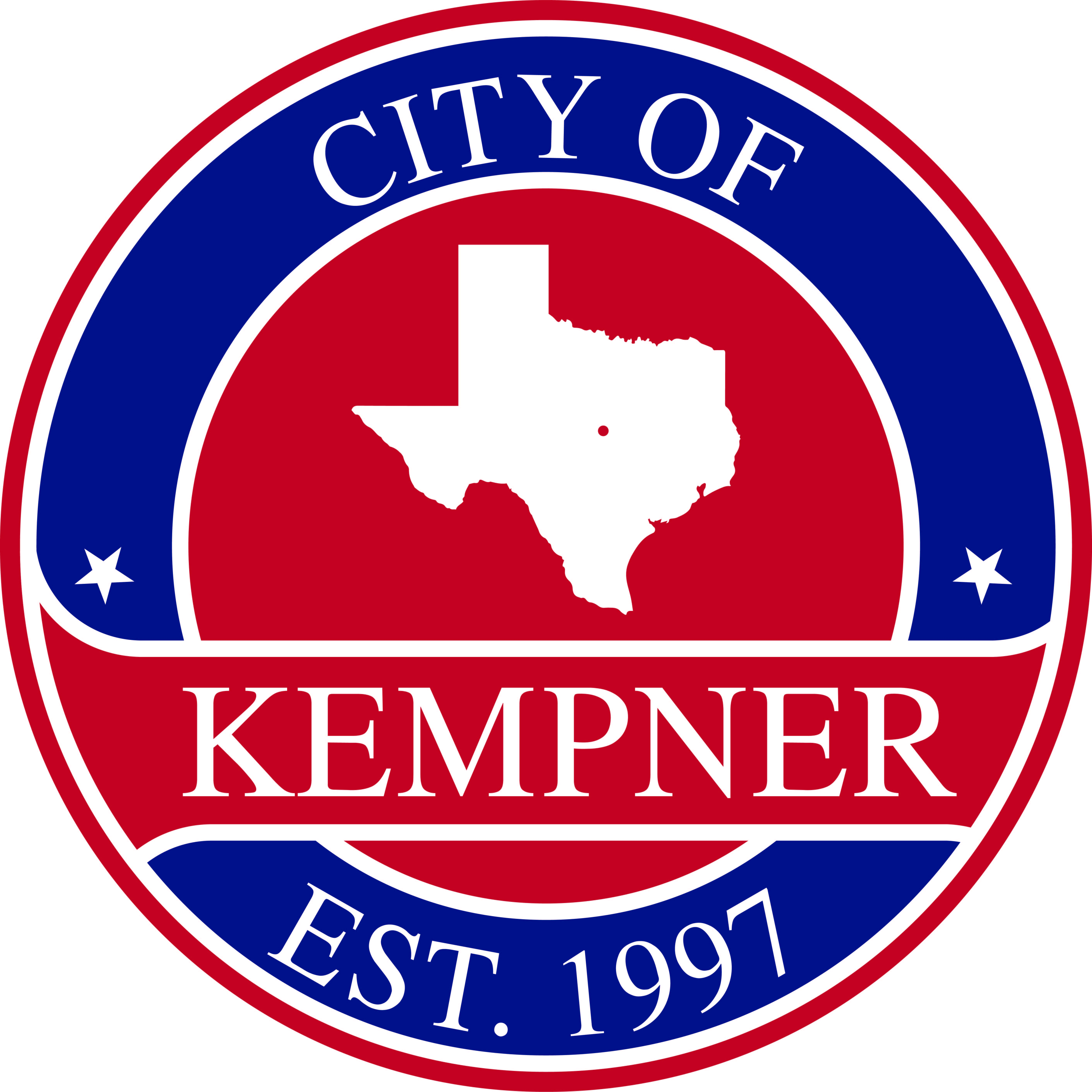
City of Kempner Logo

== Geography ==
According to the United States Census Bureau, the city has a total area of 2.2 square miles (5.7 km^{2}), all land.

=== Climate ===
The climate in this area is characterized by hot, humid summers and generally mild to cool winters. According to the Köppen climate classification, Kempner has a humid subtropical climate, Cfa on climate maps.

== History ==
https://kempnertx.gov/

== Demographics ==
Historical population
Census	Pop.	Note	%±
2000	1,004		—
2010	1,089		8.5%
2020	1,146		5.2%
U.S. Decennial Census

=== 2020 census ===
As of the 2020 census, Kempner had a population of 1,146, 443 households, and 303 families residing in the city. The median age was 43.4 years, with 21.7% of residents under the age of 18 and 16.5% aged 65 or older. For every 100 females there were 104.6 males, and for every 100 females age 18 and over there were 105.3 males age 18 and over.

0.0% of residents lived in urban areas, while 100.0% lived in rural areas.

There were 443 households in Kempner, of which 29.1% had children under the age of 18 living in them. Of all households, 54.0% were married-couple households, 19.9% were households with a male householder and no spouse or partner present, and 19.6% were households with a female householder and no spouse or partner present. About 22.4% of all households were made up of individuals and 9.5% had someone living alone who was 65 years of age or older.

There were 484 housing units, of which 8.5% were vacant. The homeowner vacancy rate was 0.0% and the rental vacancy rate was 9.0%.

Racial composition as of the 2020 census
Race	Number	Percent
White	860	75.0%
Black or African American	44	3.8%
American Indian and Alaska Native	21	1.8%
Asian	22	1.9%
Native Hawaiian and Other Pacific Islander	10	0.9%
Some other race	48	4.2%
Two or more races	141	12.3%
Hispanic or Latino (of any race)	158	13.8%

=== 2000 census ===
As of the census of 2000, 1,004 people, 351 households, and 272 families resided in the city. The population density was 450.3 inhabitants per square mile (173.9/km^{2}). The 373 housing units averaged 167.3/sq mi (64.6/km^{2}). The racial makeup of the city was 84.86% White, 6.37% African American, 0.90% Native American, 1.79% Asian, 0.20% Pacific Islander, 3.29% from other races, and 2.59% from two or more races. Hispanics or Latinos of any race were 7.97% of the population.

Of the 351 households, 38.5% had children under the age of 18 living with them, 67.2% were married couples living together, 7.4% had a female householder with no husband present, and 22.5% were not families. About 16.2% of all households were made up of individuals, and 2.6% had someone living alone who was 65 years of age or older. The average household size was 2.86 and the average family size was 3.15.

In the city, the population was distributed as 29.0% under the age of 18, 8.0% from 18 to 24, 35.2% from 25 to 44, 21.6% from 45 to 64, and 6.3% who were 65 years of age or older. The median age was 33 years. For every 100 females, there were 102.0 males. For every 100 females age 18 and over, there were 102.0 males.

The median income for a household in the city was $37,981, and for a family was $41,094. Males had a median income of $26,250 versus $19,188 for females. The per capita income for the city was $17,661. About 5.5% of families and 8.8% of the population were below the poverty line, including 15.5% of those under age 18 and 3.2% of those age 65 or over.

== Education ==
The City of Kempner is served by the Lampasas Independent School District.
