= Belton, Texas =

- City
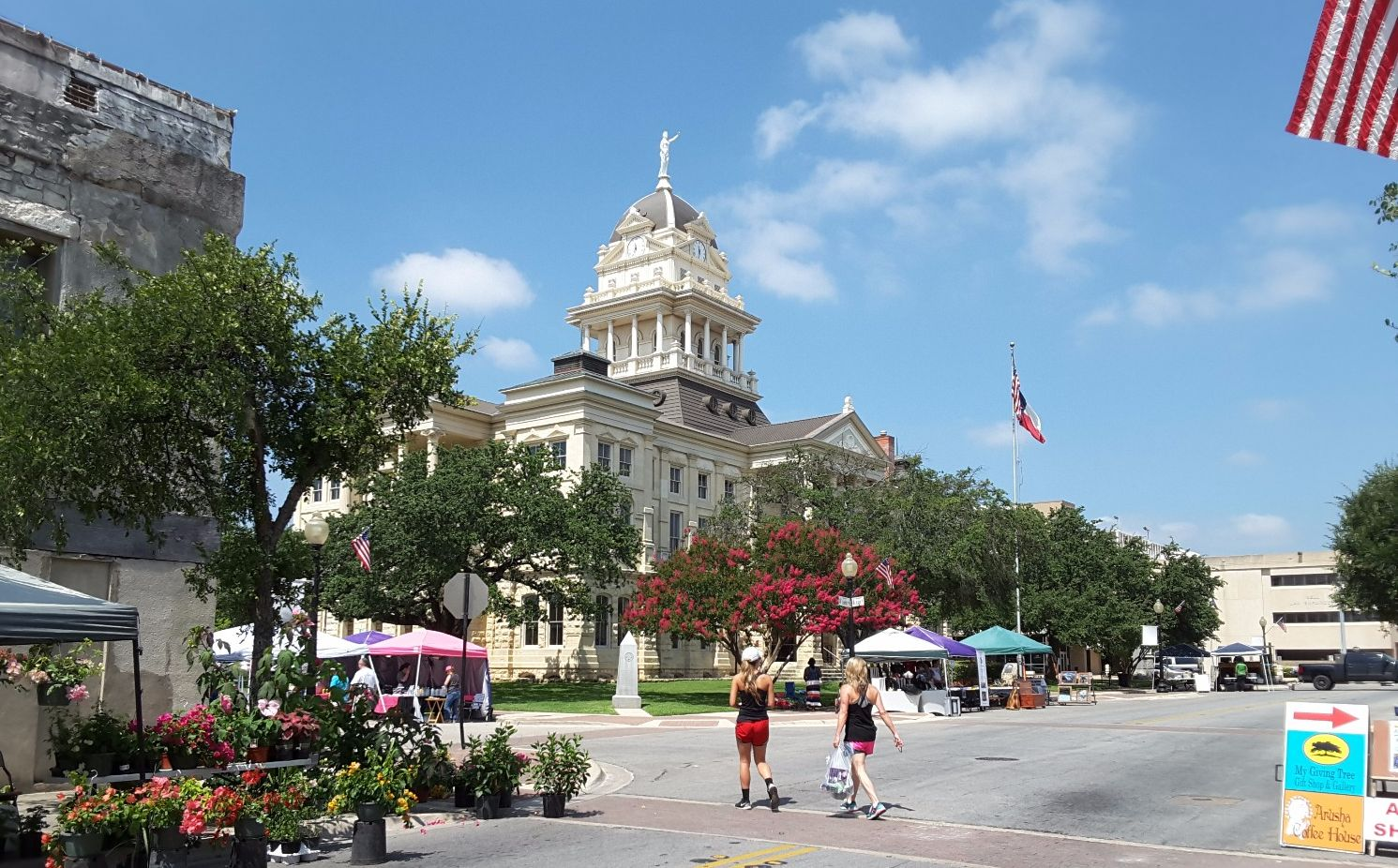
- Downtown Belton near Bell County Courthouse

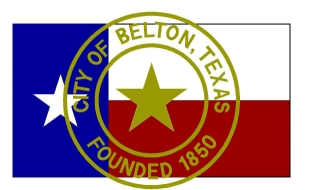
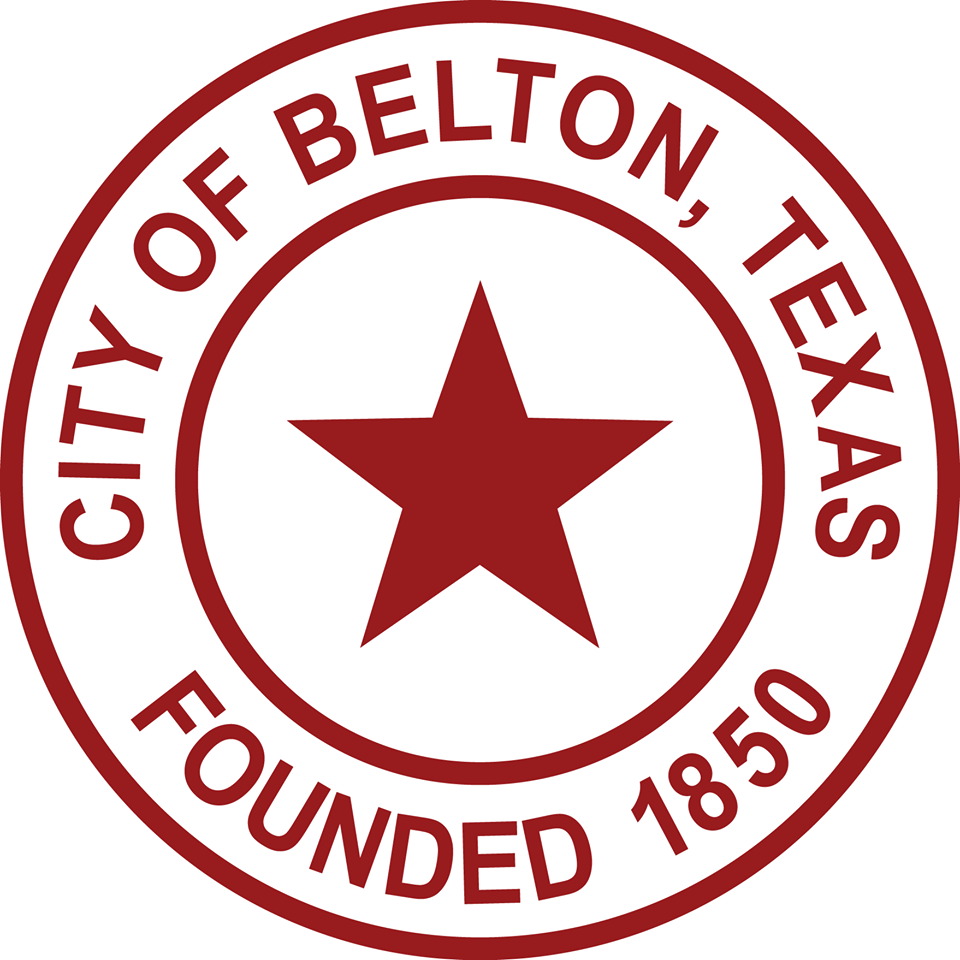
- Flag Seal
- Nickname: Beltown
- Interactive map of Belton, Texas
- Location in Texas, United States & North America Belton, Texas (the United States) Belton, Texas (North America)
- Coordinates: 31°03′09″N 97°28′45″W
- Country: United States
- State: Texas
- County: Bell
- Established: 1850
- Named for: Peter H. Bell

Area
  - Total: 21.14 sq mi (54.74 km^{2})
  - Land: 20.23 sq mi (52.39 km^{2})
  - Water: 0.91 sq mi (2.35 km^{2})
- Elevation: 617 ft (188 m)

Population (2020)
  - Total: 23,054
  - Density: 1,131.3/sq mi (436.79/km^{2})
  - Demonym: Beltonian
- Time zone: UTC-6 (Central (CST))
  - Summer (DST): UTC-5 (CDT)
- ZIP code: 76513
- Area code: 254
- FIPS code: 48-07492
- GNIS feature ID: 2409828
- Website: www.beltontexas.gov

Belton is a city in the U.S. state of Texas. It is the county seat of Bell County and is the fifth-largest city in the Killeen-Temple metropolitan area. In 2020, the population of Belton was 23,054, and the metro region had a population of 450,051 according to US Census estimates.

== History ==
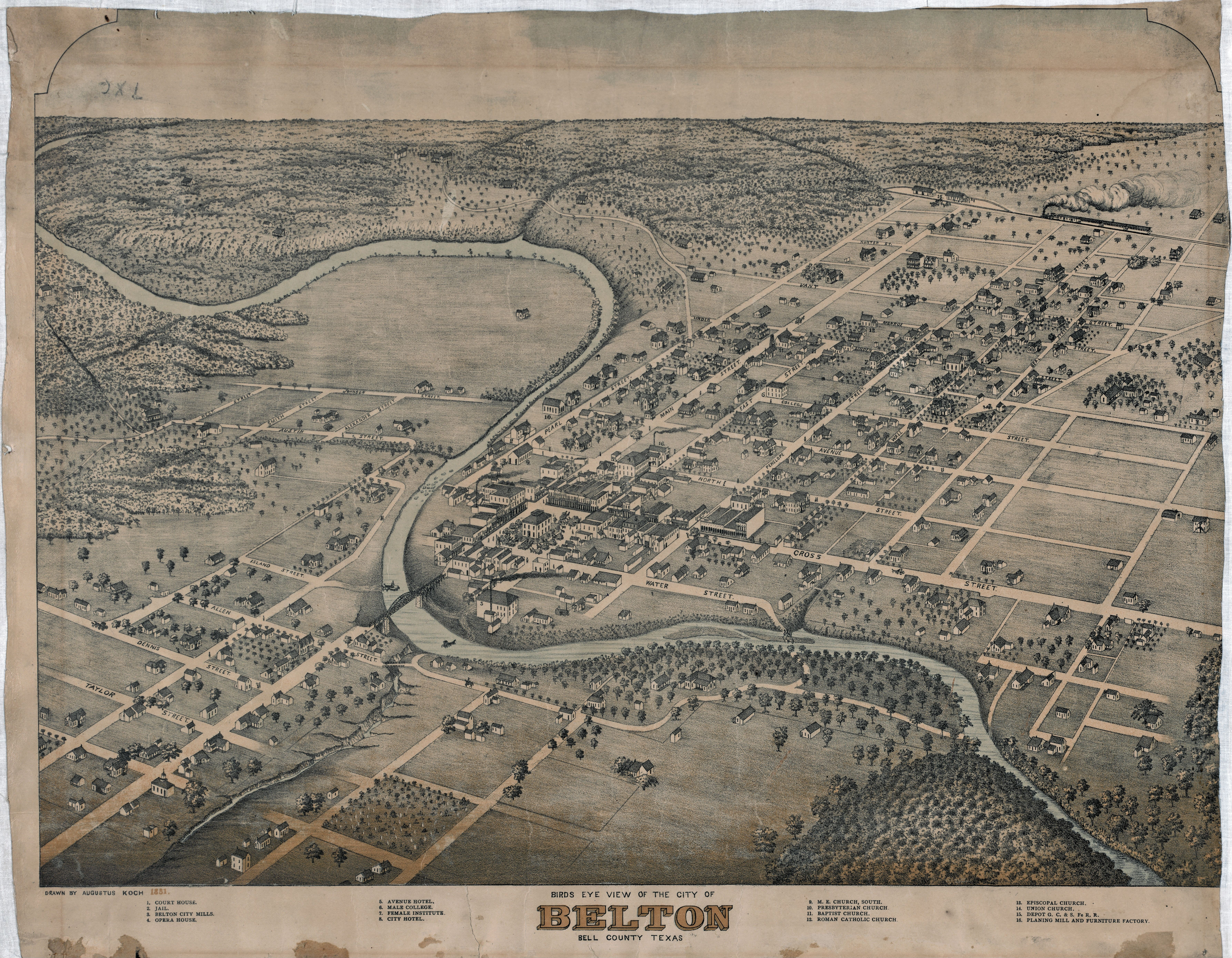
Belton c. 1881

Belton and Bell County have been the site of human habitation since at least 6000 BCE. Evidence of early inhabitants, including campsites, kitchen middens, and burial mounds from the late prehistoric era have been discovered in the Stillhouse Hollow Lake and Belton Lake areas. The earliest identifiable inhabitants were the Tonkawa, who traditionally followed buffalo by foot. Belton was also home to the Lipan Apache, Wacos, Nadaco, Kiowas and Comanche. By the 1840s, most tribes had been pushed out by settlements, but skirmishes with the Comanche continued until the early 1870s.

Belton was first settled 1850 and named Nolanville, taking the name of nearby Nolan Springs, which were named after Texan explorer Philip Nolan. In 1851, it changed its name to Belton after being named the county seat of newly created Bell County, named after Peter Hansborough Bell, the governor of Texas at that time. In 1860, its population was 300, the largest in the county. During the run-up to the civil war, Belton had a large pro-Union minority. A Whig Party antisecession newspaper called The Independent was published there and the city voted overwhelmingly for Sam Houston for governor, who was strongly against Texas secession. Nonetheless, in 1861 Bell County voted for secession, and many residents fought in the Confederate Army. After the civil war, Belton experienced unrest. Several pro-Union sympathizers were lynched in 1866, and federal troops were called in to protect the federal judge serving in the city. After Reconstruction, the city, close to a major feeder of the Chisholm Trail, served as growing business center for the region.

In 1868, Martha McWhirter, a prominent figure in Belton's nonsectarian Union Sunday School, created the Woman's Commonwealth, the only Texas women's commune of the 1800s. The commune started several business ventures, including a successful hotel. In 1899, the group sold their holdings and relocated to Maryland. The town experienced rapid growth in the 1880s with the building of the courthouse, Baylor Female College buildings, and a "railroad war" in which, by 1881, Belton was bypassed by the Gulf, Colorado and Santa Fe Railroad, which built Temple, 8 miles to the east, as the local junction and depot town. In 1904, Belton reported a population of 3,700. The town began to thrive and reached a population of 6,500 in 1928. The town was decimated by the Great Depression, though, and was down to a population of 3,779 only three years later in 1931.

The town began to recover in the run-up to World War II, as Fort Hood was opened nearby in 1942, housing the tank destroyer Tactical and Firing Center. Encompassing over 200,000 acres and almost 90,000 troops, this brought a large population and economic activity to the area. By 1950, the city's population was back up to 6,246, and by 1990, it had reached 12,476.

== Geography ==
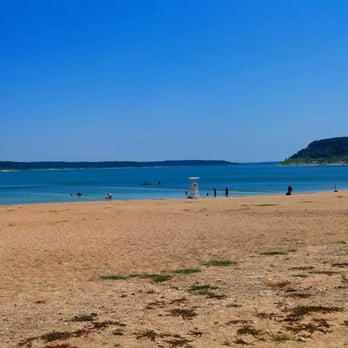
Beach at Belton Lake Outdoor Recreation Center.

Belton is located 60 miles (97 km) north of Austin, 137 miles (220 km) south of Dallas, and 184 miles (296 km) west of Houston. It is near the center of Bell County at the point where the Blackland Prairie, characterized by level ground and deep, fertile soil, and the Edwards Plateau, characterized by its many springs, hills, and steep canyons, meet. Its elevation is about 509 feet (155 m) above sea level.

It is bordered to the northeast by the Leon River, across which is the city of Temple. Nolan Creek, a tributary of the Leon, runs through the center of Belton. It is also southeast of Belton Lake and northeast of Stillhouse Hollow Lake with both touching its city limits. The city limits extend south along Interstate 35 across the Lampasas River nearly to Salado, and abuts the Temple city limits at the Leon River.

According to the United States Census Bureau, the city has a total area of 20.0 square miles (51.7 km^{2}), of which 1.0 square mile (2.6 km^{2}), or 5.08%, is covered by water.

== Climate ==
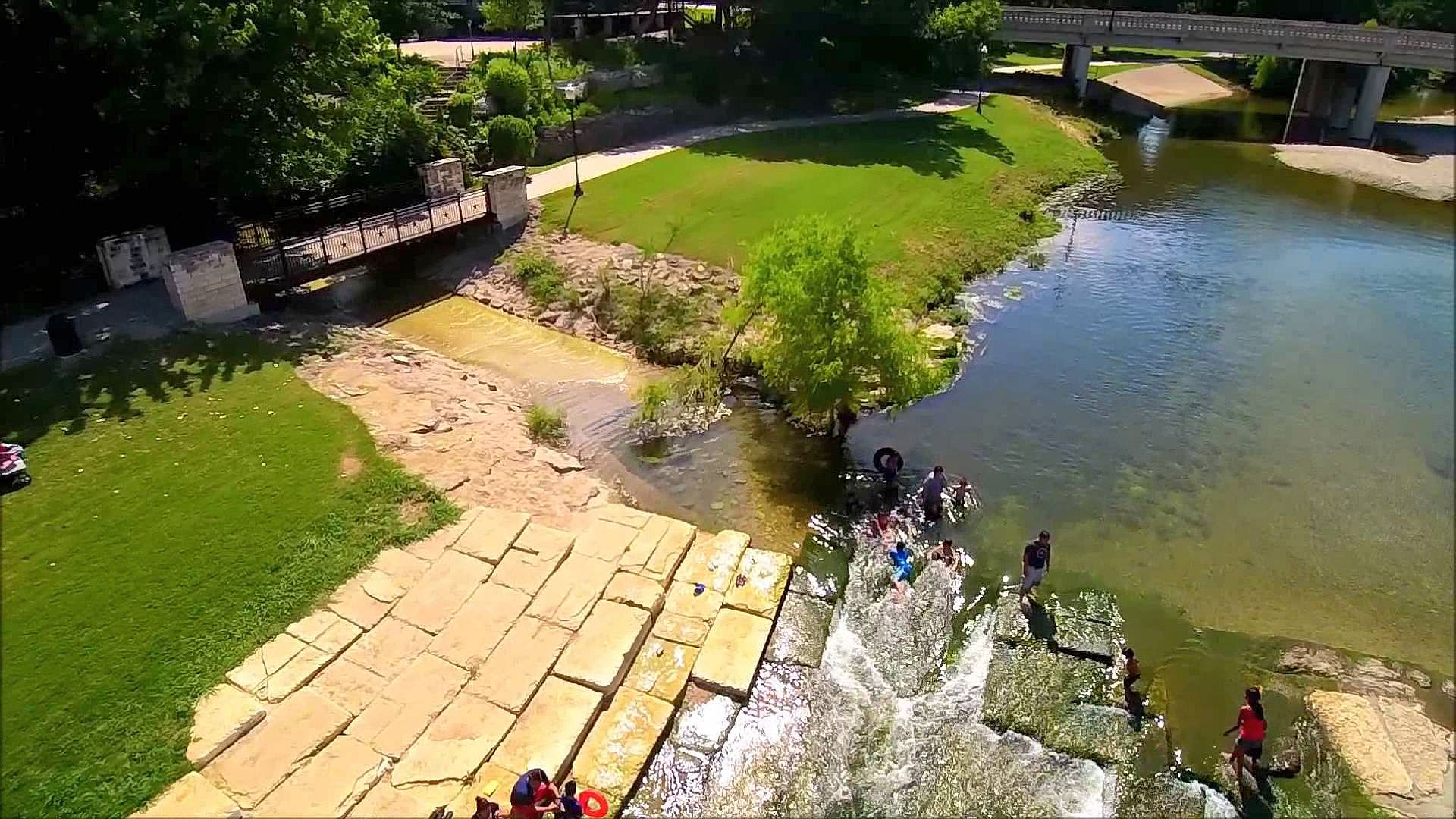
Nolan Creek Tube Chutes & swimming area

Belton has a humid subtropical climate under the Köppen climate classification, typified by hot and muggy summers, short, mild winters, and pleasantly warm spring and fall seasons. Belton averages 35.2 inches (890 mm) of annual rainfall and it is distributed mostly evenly throughout the year.

The average temperature for the year in Belton is 66.3 °F (19.1 °C). The warmest month, on average, is August with an average temperature of 83.3 °F (28.5 °C). The coolest month on average is January, with an average temperature of 47.4 °F (8.6 °C).

Snow is rare in Belton, and ground accumulation even rarer. An average of 0.1" of snow falls annually, mostly in January, but February 2021 brought a snowstorm to Belton that impacted many homes, forcing many people to live without power or heat for as long as a week. The snow was thick and the ice was thicker, blocking roads and making driving very dangerous.

Although severe weather can and does occur, typically during the spring with supercell thunderstorms, it does not fall within the conventional limits of Tornado Alley.

== Demographics ==
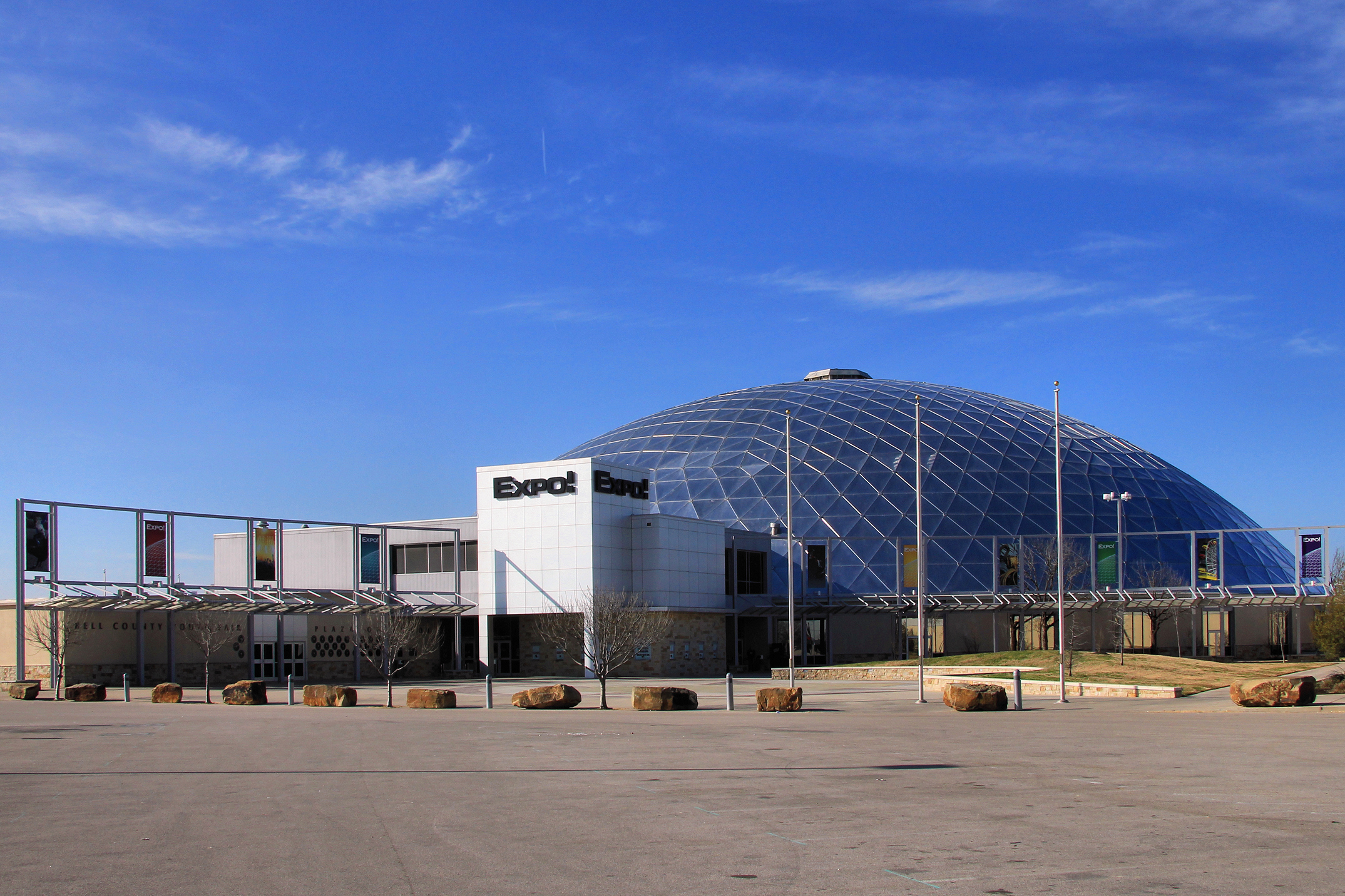
Bell County Expo Center in Belton.

Historical population
Census	Pop.	Note	%±
1870	281		—
1880	1,797		539.5%
1890	3,000		66.9%
1900	3,700		23.3%
1910	4,164		12.5%
1920	5,098		22.4%
1930	3,779		−25.9%
1940	3,572		−5.5%
1950	6,246		74.9%
1960	8,163		30.7%
1970	8,696		6.5%
1980	10,660		22.6%
1990	12,476		17.0%
2000	14,623		17.2%
2010	18,216		24.6%
2020	23,054		26.6%
2023 (est.)	25,171		9.2%
U.S. Decennial Census

=== 2020 census ===
As of the 2020 census, Belton had a population of 23,054, 7,934 households, and 4,157 families. The median age was 32.2 years; 22.4% of residents were under 18 and 13.7% were 65 or older. For every 100 females, there were 92.3 males, and for every 100 females 18 and over, there were 90.2 males 18 and over.

About 97.2% of residents lived in urban areas, while 2.8% lived in rural areas.

Of the 7,934 households, 33.7% had children under 18 living in them, 45.4% were married-couple households, 18.6% were households with a male householder and no spouse or partner present, and 30.8% were households with a female householder and no spouse or partner present. About 29.1% of all households were made up of individuals, and 10.6% had someone living alone who was 65 or older.

The city had 8,648 housing units, of which 8.3% were vacant. Among occupied housing units, 53.5% were owner-occupied and 46.5% were renter-occupied. The homeowner vacancy rate was 2.3% and the rental vacancy rate was 9.1%.

Racial composition as of the 2020 census
Race	Percentage
White	63.4%
Black or African American	8.9%
American Indian and Alaska Native	1.3%
Asian	1.7%
Native Hawaiian and other Pacific Islander	0.1%
Some other race	10.4%
Two or more races	14.0%
Hispanic or Latino (of any race)	30.7%

=== 2000 census ===
As of the 2000 census, 14,623 people, 4,742 households, and 3,319 families were residing in the city. The population density was 1,171.3 inhabitants per square mile (452.2/km^{2}). The 5,089 housing units had an average density of 407.6 per square mile (157.4/km^{2}). The racial makeup of the city was 72.67% White, 8.10% African American, 0.64% Native American, 0.95% Asian, 0.10% Pacific Islander, 14.83% from other races, and 2.71% from two or more races. Hispanics or Latinos of any race were 25.13% of the population.

Of the 4,742 households, 37.3% had children under 18 living with them, 49.9% were married couples living together, 16.1% had a female householder with no husband present, and 30.0% were not families. About 24.6% of all households were made up of individuals, and 10.6% had someone living alone who was 65 or older. The average household size was 2.69, and the average family size was 3.23.

In the city, the age distribution was 26.9% under 18, 18.4% from 18 to 24, 26.5% from 25 to 44, 17.1% from 45 to 64, and 11.1% who were 65 or older. The median age was 28 years. For every 100 females, there were 95.0 males. For every 100 females 18 and over, there were 90.4 males.

The median income in the city for a household was $32,052 and for a family was $38,635. Males had a median income of $31,304 versus $20,678 for females. The per capita income for the city was $14,345. About 12.7% of families and 17.9% of the population were below the poverty line, including 20.7% of those under 18 and 14.0% of those 65 or over.

== Education ==
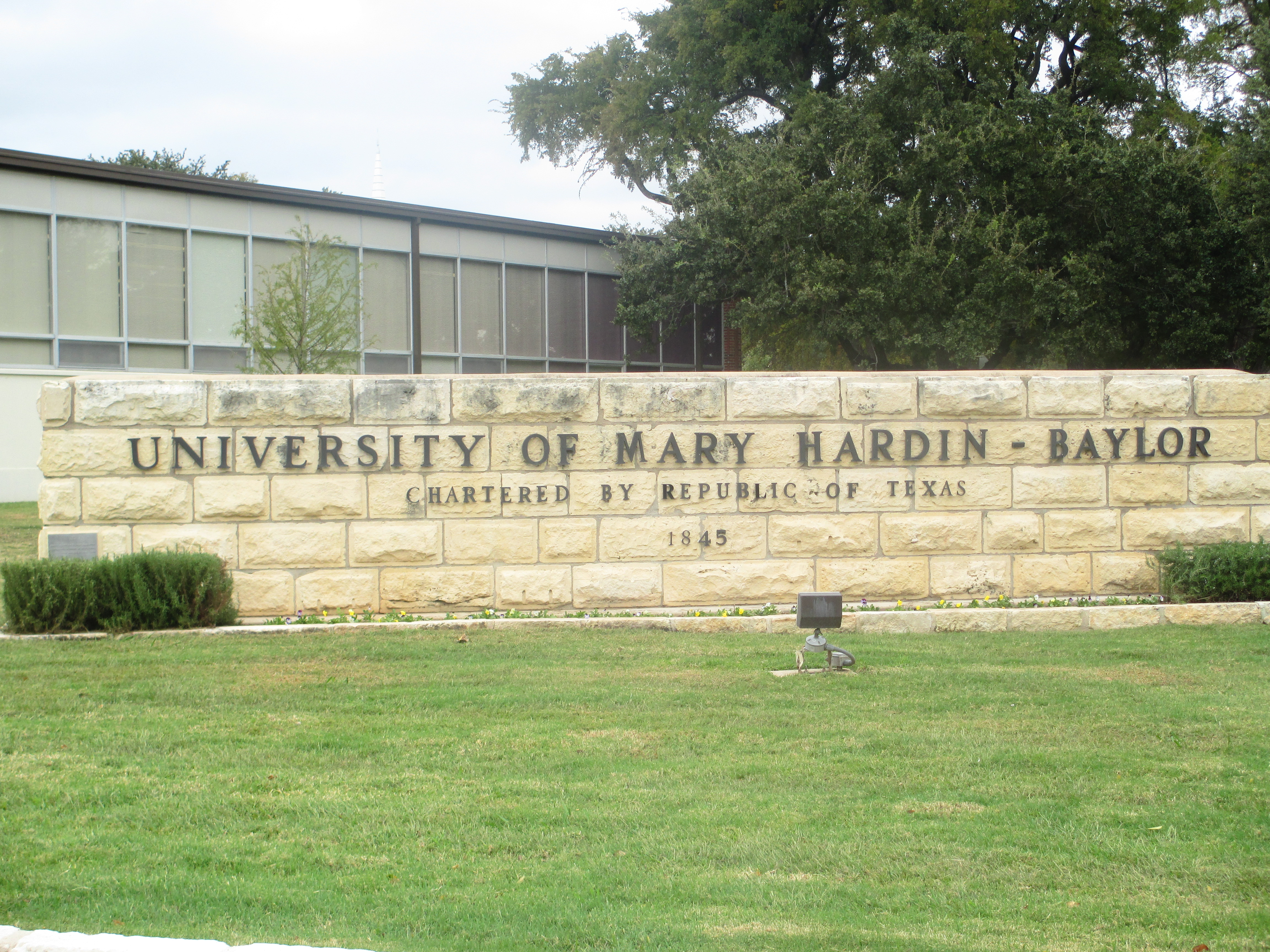
University of Mary Hardin-Baylor

Belton is served by the Belton Independent School District, which operates three high schools, four middle schools, and nine elementary schools (some of which happen to be outside of the city's borders). The district and all of its campuses received the Texas Education Agency's highest accountability rating (met standard) based on student performance on the State of Texas Assessment of Academic Readiness. Both Belton High School and Belton New Tech High School have been included on lists of the nation's best high schools compiled by U.S. News & World Report and Newsweek. Belton New Tech High School and South Belton Middle School have been recognized as Apple Distinguished Schools for their implementation of the district's digital learning initiative. Belton ISD also offers prekindergarten at Belton Early Childhood School.

Falling in Temple city limits but within the boundaries of Belton Independent School District is Central Texas Christian School, a private Christian K–12 school with an enrollment around 570 students.

=== Higher education ===
Belton is home to the University of Mary Hardin–Baylor. Founded in 1845, it is a private Christian university affiliated with the Baptist General Convention of Texas. Awarding degrees at the baccalaureate, master's, and doctoral levels, it has an enrollment of 3,898.

== Parks and recreation ==
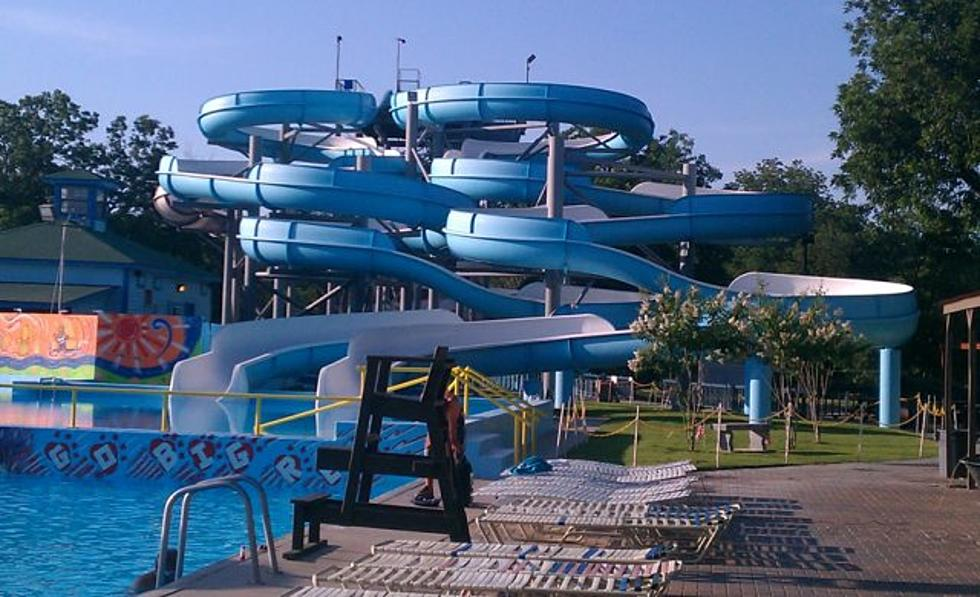
A water park named Summer Fun in Belton

The city maintains 13 city parks. Largest among them are Heritage Park, which is along the Leon River; Yettie Polk Park, which winds along Nolan Creek with a walking trail reaching from Interstate 35 to the University of Mary Hardin-Baylor; and Miller Springs Nature Center, offering hiking trails along the Leon River below the Belton Lake Dam.

For recreation, Belton has two major lakes: Belton Lake on the Leon River and Stillhouse Hollow Lake on the Lampasas River. Belton Lake has 11 public-access parks owned and maintained by the United States Army Corps of Engineers. Stillhouse Lake has four with lake access. These parks offer many amenities such as boat docks, picnic areas, hike and bike trails, camping sites, public restroom facilities, marinas, and designated sandy swimming beaches.

The Summer Fun Water Park features slides, a lazy river, and other fun activities.

== Notable people ==
- David Ash, football player, graduated from Belton High School
- Danny Barnes, musician
- George Eads, actor, graduated from Belton High School
- Miriam Amanda Wallace "Ma" Ferguson, first female Governor of Texas
- Jerry Grote, MLB baseball player, lived in Belton
- George Jo Hennard, mass murderer, and perpetrator of the Luby's shooting
- Rick Hoberg, comic artist of All-Star Squadron, Green Arrow and The Strangers
- Chris Marion, musician, of the Little River Band was born in Belton
- Khiry Robinson, NFL football player
- Ricky Sanders, NFL football player, graduated from Belton High School
- Pat Seals, musician, from the alternative rock band Flyleaf
- Durham Smythe, NFL football player, graduated from Belton High School
- Walton Walker, U.S. Army general officer killed in action in the Korean War
- Henry T. Waskow, the basis of a famous article by Ernie Pyle, was a Belton native
- William Wilbanks, American criminologist, Texas High School Basketball Hall of Fame member
- Rudy Youngblood, actor, graduated from Belton High School

== Sports ==
=== Baseball ===
- Red Murff Field (2005)
