= Lometa, Texas =

- City
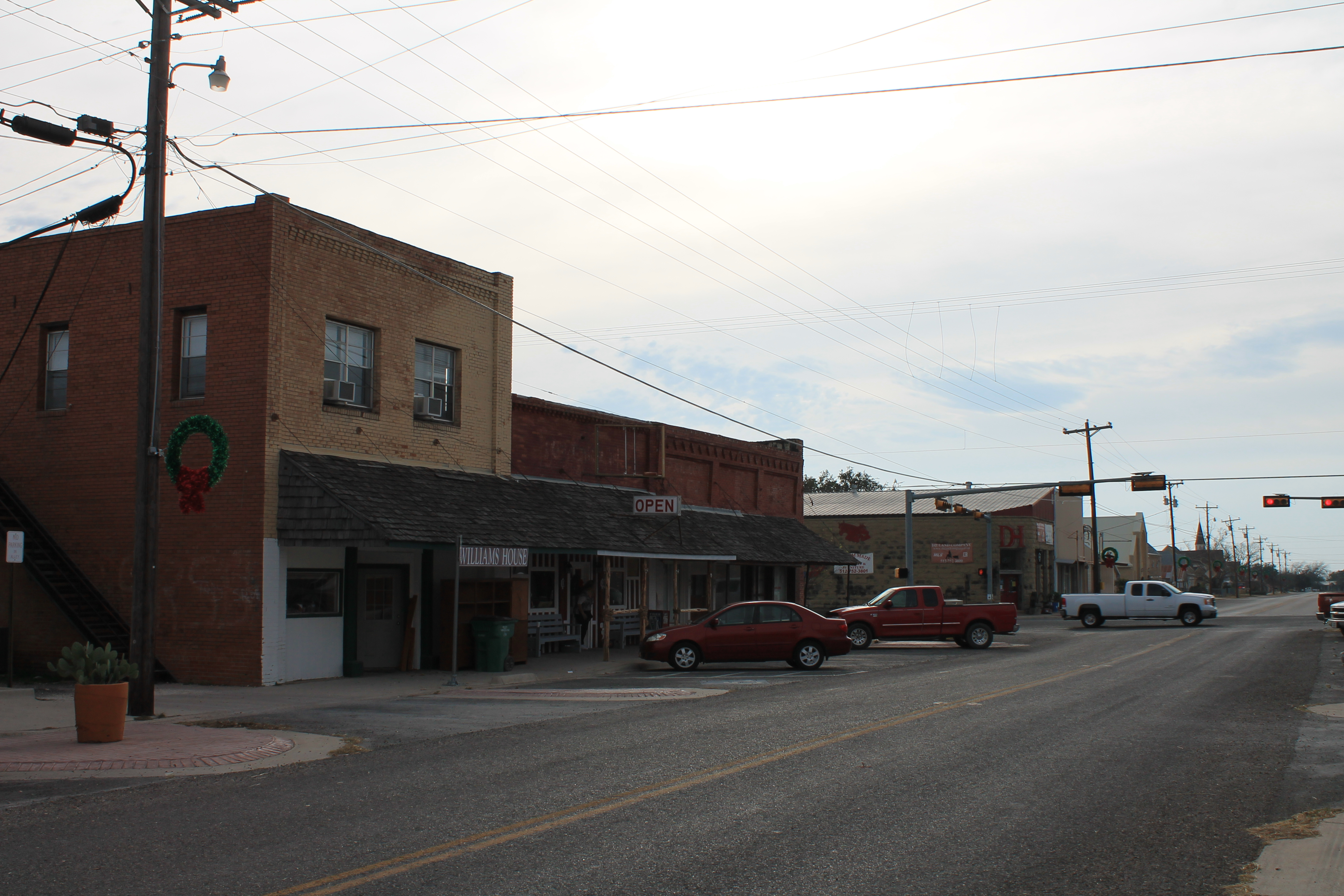

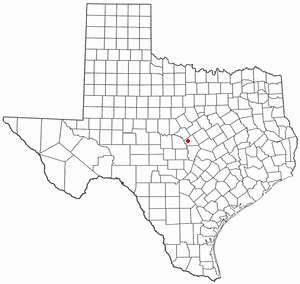
- Location of Lometa, Texas

- Coordinates: 31°13′00″N 98°23′33″W
- Country: United States
- State: Texas
- County: Lampasas

Area
  - Total: 0.84 sq mi (2.17 km^{2})
  - Land: 0.84 sq mi (2.17 km^{2})
  - Water: 0 sq mi (0.00 km^{2})
- Elevation: 1,496 ft (456 m)

Population (2020)
  - Total: 753
  - Density: 899/sq mi (347/km^{2})
- Time zone: UTC-6 (Central (CST))
  - Summer (DST): UTC-5 (CDT)
- ZIP code: 76853
- Area code: 512
- FIPS code: 48-43516
- GNIS feature ID: 2410858
- Website: www.lometatx.com

Lometa (/loʊˈmiːtə/ loh-MEE-tə) is a city in Lampasas County, Texas, United States. The population was 753 at the 2020 census. It is part of the Killeen–Temple–Fort Hood metropolitan statistical area.

== Geography ==
According to the United States Census Bureau, the city has a total area of 0.9 sq mi (2.3 km^{2}), all land.

=== Climate ===
The climate in this area is characterized by hot, humid summers and generally mild to cool winters. According to the Köppen climate classification, Lometa has a humid subtropical climate, Cfa.

== History ==
The name Lometa originates from an English transliteration of the Spanish word lomita meaning "little hill".

== Events ==
The annual festivals in Lometa are a spring Diamondback Jubilee, an annual livestock show, and a summer junior rodeo.

Lometa has one traffic light, a recent improvement as of 2003 from the original four-way stop, in the middle of town. On the edge of town is a municipal park with camping sites and a rodeo arena and grounds.

Lometa was a 200-acre (0.81 km^{2}) site platted May 17, 1886, as a railroad stop. The town was rapidly transferred out of the nearby stagecoach stop of Senterfitt. The town had originally been called Montvale, but a change was made in 1886 when an application for a post office was made.

By 1890, the population included 150 Lometans, and four years later, the town got its first newspaper. Another weekly paper was published in 1896, and a third by 1900.

== Demographics ==
Historical population
Census	Pop.	Note	%±
1920	995		—
1930	865		−13.1%
1940	915		5.8%
1950	951		3.9%
1960	817		−14.1%
1970	633		−22.5%
1980	666		5.2%
1990	625		−6.2%
2000	782		25.1%
2010	856		9.5%
2020	753		−12.0%
U.S. Decennial Census

=== 2020 census ===
As of the 2020 census, Lometa had a population of 753, a median age of 34.8 years, 31.2% of residents under the age of 18, and 17.3% aged 65 or older.

For every 100 females there were 95.1 males, and for every 100 females age 18 and over there were 97.0 males age 18 and over.

There were 268 households in Lometa, of which 38.8% had children under the age of 18 living in them. Of all households, 45.9% were married-couple households, 18.7% were households with a male householder and no spouse or partner present, and 28.0% were households with a female householder and no spouse or partner present. About 25.7% of all households were made up of individuals and 12.4% had someone living alone who was 65 years of age or older.

There were 325 housing units, of which 17.5% were vacant. The homeowner vacancy rate was 5.4% and the rental vacancy rate was 5.9%.

0.0% of residents lived in urban areas, while 100.0% lived in rural areas.

Racial composition as of the 2020 census
Race	Number	Percent
White	427	56.7%
Black or African American	11	1.5%
American Indian and Alaska Native	10	1.3%
Asian	3	0.4%
Native Hawaiian and Other Pacific Islander	0	0.0%
Some other race	166	22.0%
Two or more races	136	18.1%
Hispanic or Latino (of any race)	360	47.8%

=== 2000 census ===
As of the census of 2000, 782 people, 291 households, and 190 families resided in the city. The population density was 866.6 people/sq mi (335.5/km^{2}). The 339 housing units averaged 375.7/sq mi (145.4/km^{2}). The racial makeup of the city was 83.12% White, 2.30% African American, 1.02% Native American, 0.13% Asian, 11.51% from other races, and 1.92% from two or more races. Hispanics or Latinos of any race were 29.80% of the population.

Of the 291 households, 28.2% had children under 18 living with them, 46.7% were married couples living together, 10.7% had a female householder with no husband present, and 34.7% were not families. About 31.3% of all households were made up of individuals, and 21.0% had someone living alone who was 65 years of age or older. The average household size was 2.52 and the average family size was 3.14.

In the city, the age distribution was 33.5% under the age of 18, 7.5% from 18 to 24, 19.7% from 25 to 44, 23.4% from 45 to 64, and 15.9% who were 65 years of age or older. The median age was 34 years. For every 100 females, there were 102.1 males. For every 100 females age 18 and over, there were 94.0 males.

The median income for a household in the city was $21,923, and for a family was $28,125. Males had a median income of $27,917 versus $16,538 for females. The per capita income for the city was $10,428. About 19.3% of families and 29.1% of the population were below the poverty line, including 38.3% of those under age 18 and 18.8% of those age 65 or over.

== Transportation ==
Lometa is served by two major highways, U.S. Routes 183 and 190. Two railroads are located in Lometa, BNSF Railway (previously the Santa Fe Railway) and the Heart of Texas Railroad (previously the Santa Fe Railway's) branch to Brady, Texas. Until July 1968, Lometa was a night flag stop on the Santa Fe passenger train the California Special that ran from Clovis, New Mexico to Houston.

== Education ==
Lometa has one primary education facility covering prekindergarten through 12th grade. The school is a part of the Lometa Independent School District and the mascot is the fighting hornet; the school colors are maroon and gold.
