= Lampasas Independent School District =

School district in Texas

Logo of Lampasas Independent School District

Lampasas Independent School District is a public school district based in Lampasas, Texas (USA) that serves about 3,350 students.

In addition to Lampasas, the district also serves the city of Kempner and part of the Bend community. Located mostly in Lampasas County, portions of the district extend into Burnet, Bell, and Coryell counties.

The school district's mascot is the badger.

In 2015, the school district was rated "MET STANDARD" by the Texas Education Agency

== Schools ==
- Lampasas High School (Grades 9-12)
- Lampasas Middle School (Grades 6-8)
- Hanna Springs Elementary School (Grades K-5)
- Kline Whitis Elementary School (Grades PK-5)
- Taylor Creek Elementary School (Grades PK-5)
