= Coody =

Coody is a surname of Irish origin. Notable people with the surname include:

- Ann Coody (born 1937), American politician
- Charles Coody (born 1937), American professional golfer
- Jeff Coody (born 1960), American politician
- Jerry Coody (born 1931), Canadian football player
- Parker Coody (born 2000), American professional golfer
- Pierceson Coody (born 2000), American professional golfer
