= Jim Hargrove (American football) =

American football player (1945–2017)

No. 50, 60
- Position: Linebacker

Personal information
- Born: February 21, 1945; Temple, Texas, U.S.
- Died: August 17, 2017 (aged 72); Lampasas, Texas, U.S.
- Listed height: 6 ft 2 in (1.88 m)
- Listed weight: 233 lb (106 kg)

Career information
- High school: Academy (Little River-Academy, Texas)
- College: Howard Payne
- NFL draft: 1967: 14th round, 348th overall pick

Career history
- Minnesota Vikings (1967–1970); St. Louis Cardinals (1971–1972)

Awards and highlights
- NFL champion (1969)

Career NFL statistics
- Fumble recoveries: 1
- Interceptions: 1
- Sacks: 1
- Stats at Pro Football Reference

James Lawrence Hargrove (February 21, 1945 – August 17, 2017), also known as Red Hargrove, was an American football player who played as a linebacker in the National Football League (NFL) from 1967 to 1972. Born in Temple, Texas, he attended Academy High School in Little River-Academy, Texas, followed by Howard Payne University and was drafted by the Minnesota Vikings in the 14th round (348th overall) of the 1967 NFL/AFL draft. He played for the team for four seasons before joining the St. Louis Cardinals in 1971. He played for the Cardinals for two seasons, making his final professional appearance in 1972. He died in Lampasas, Texas.
