= List of Baylor Bears in the NFL draft =

The Baylor Bears began sending draftees to the NFL in 1939. The most selections in a single year is six, set in the 1987 NFL draft, 2016 NFL draft and 2022 NFL draft.

== Key ==
B	Back	K	Kicker	NT	Nose tackle
C	Center	LB	Linebacker	FB	Fullback
DB	Defensive back	P	Punter	HB	Halfback
DE	Defensive end	QB	Quarterback	WR	Wide receiver
DT	Defensive tackle	RB	Running back	G	Guard
E	End	T	Offensive tackle	TE	Tight end

== Selections ==
Year	Round	Pick	Overall	Player	Team	Position
1937	8	2	72	John Reynolds	Chicago Cardinals	C
1938	10	2	82	Emmett Kriel	Philadelphia Eagles	T
1939	3	2	17	Billy Patterson	Pittsburgh Steelers	B
1939	6	1	41	Sam Boyd	Pittsburgh Steelers	E
1940	7	7	57	Len Akin	Chicago Bears	G
1940	15	7	137	Sherm Barnes	Chicago Bears	E
1940	18	10	170	Bennett Edwards	New York Giants	T
1941	5	5	35	Bob Nelson	Detroit Lions	C
1941	16	7	147	Wilson Lucas	New York Giants	E
1941	17	6	156	Jack Anderson	New York Giants	T
1942	1	2	2	Jack Wilson	Los Angeles Rams	B
1942	15	3	133	O'Dell Griffin	Philadelphia Eagles	G
1943	3	7	22	Jack Russell	Pittsburgh Steelers	E
1943	8	8	68	Lester Gatewood	Green Bay Packers	C
1943	10	8	88	Solon Barnett	Green Bay Packers	G
1943	15	7	137	Milt Crain	Pittsburgh Steelers	B
1944	21	5	213	M. L. Kittrell	New York Giants	B
1944	30	5	312	Francis Nelson	New York Giants	B
1945	14	3	134	Solon Barnett	Chicago Cardinals	G
1945	21	2	210	J. D. Cheek	Chicago Cardinals	G
1946	17	4	154	Dick Johnson	Chicago Bears	C
1946	21	2	192	Jack Price	Boston Yanks	B
1947	31	3	288	Bill Stephens	Philadelphia Eagles	T
1948	7	9	54	Buddy Tinsley	Philadelphia Eagles	T
1949	2	6	17	George Sims	Los Angeles Rams	B
1949	21	3	204	Sammy Pierce	Boston Yanks	B
1950	1	2	2	Adrian Burk	Baltimore Colts	QB
1950	11	8	139	J. D. Ison	Chicago Cardinals	E
1950	13	12	169	Rupe Wright	Cleveland Browns	G
1950	15	3	186	Gene Huebern	Green Bay Packers	C
1950	19	2	237	Bob Griffin	New York Bulldogs	B
1950	27	1	340	Mitford Johnson	Baltimore Colts	B
1950	27	6	345	Art Sweet	New York Giants	B
1950	30	13	391	Dud Parker	Philadelphia Eagles	B
1951	7	5	79	Frank Boydston	Philadelphia Eagles	B
1951	14	1	160	Adrian Burk	Washington Redskins	QB
1951	17	9	204	Hal Riley	Los Angeles Rams	E
1952	1	7	7	Larry Isbell	Washington Redskins	B
1952	4	3	40	Ken Casner	Los Angeles Rams	T
1952	6	3	64	John Hancock	Chicago Cardinals	G
1952	8	1	86	Stan Williams	Cleveland Browns	E
1952	10	8	117	Steve Dowden	Detroit Lions	T
1952	10	12	121	Luke Welch	Los Angeles Rams	T
1952	14	7	164	Gale Galloway	Chicago Bears	C
1952	21	11	252	Dick Calhoun	Cleveland Browns	G
1952	27	7	320	Bob Reid	Chicago Bears	B
1952	27	9	322	Bob Trout	Detroit Lions	E
1953	7	1	74	Bill Athey	Baltimore Colts	G
1953	19	6	223	Bill Lucky	Green Bay Packers	T
1953	27	3	316	C. O. Brocato	Chicago Cardinals	C
1953	27	10	323	Jack Sisco	Cleveland Browns	C
1954	1	5	5	Cotton Davidson	Baltimore Colts	QB
1954	5	11	60	Bill Lucky	Cleveland Browns	T
1954	6	3	64	Jim Ray Smith	Cleveland Browns	G
1954	17	7	200	Jerry Coody	Washington Redskins	B
1954	17	8	201	Bob Knowles	Philadelphia Eagles	T
1954	26	8	309	Charley Smith	Philadelphia Eagles	B
1955	3	2	27	L. G. Dupree	Baltimore Colts	B
1955	19	10	227	Allen Jones	Chicago Bears	B
1955	26	1	302	Billy Hooper	Chicago Cardinals	B
1956	3	4	29	Jim Taylor	Pittsburgh Steelers	C
1956	6	5	66	Charlie Dupre	Chicago Cardinals	B
1956	7	7	80	Hank Gremminger	Green Bay Packers	E
1956	8	5	90	David Lunceford	Chicago Cardinals	T
1956	13	3	148	Weldon Holley	Pittsburgh Steelers	B
1956	20	7	236	Clyde Letbetter	Green Bay Packers	T
1957	1	11	11	Del Shofner	Los Angeles Rams	B
1957	1	12	12	Bill Glass	Detroit Lions	G
1957	7	6	79	Reuben Saage	Baltimore Colts	B
1957	8	9	94	Charlie Bradshaw	Los Angeles Rams	T
1957	18	1	206	Billy Kelley	Philadelphia Eagles	T
1958	2	8	21	Bobby Jack Oliver	Chicago Cardinals	T
1958	3	1	26	Larry Cowart	Chicago Cardinals	C
1958	12	1	134	Wayne Miller	Green Bay Packers	E
1958	25	11	300	Bobby Peters	Cleveland Browns	B
1958	29	6	343	Mert Fuquay	Pittsburgh Steelers	E
1959	1	9	9	Paul Dickson	Los Angeles Rams	T
1959	2	4	16	Buddy Humphrey	Los Angeles Rams	QB
1959	2	6	18	Charley Horton	Detroit Lions	G
1959	3	7	31	Larry Hickman	Los Angeles Rams	B
1959	8	8	92	Dick Clark	Chicago Bears	B
1959	12	7	139	Bill Pavliska	Pittsburgh Steelers	B
1959	13	8	152	Al Witcher	Los Angeles Rams	E
1959	17	11	203	Austin Gonsoulin	New York Giants	E
1959	24	8	284	Bob Spain	Chicago Bears	T
1960	17	11	203	Austin Gonsoulin	San Francisco 49ers	DB
1961	4	2	44	Arnold Davis	Dallas Cowboys	E
1961	8	13	111	John Frongillo	Cleveland Browns	T
1961	9	7	119	Pete Nicklas	Baltimore Colts	T
1961	10	12	138	Buck McLeod	Green Bay Packers	T
1961	11	4	144	Bob Lane	Los Angeles Rams	E
1961	18	7	245	Willson Allison	Baltimore Colts	T
1962	1	7	7	Ronnie Bull	Chicago Bears	RB
1962	16	6	216	Bobby Ply	Pittsburgh Steelers	B
1962	17	11	235	Herbert Harlan	Cleveland Browns	E
1962	19	2	254	Tommy Minteer	Minnesota Vikings	B
1963	9	5	117	Don Trull	Baltimore Colts	QB
1963	12	5	159	Jimmy Maples	Baltimore Colts	C
1963	16	4	214	Ronnie Goodwin	Philadelphia Eagles	B
1964	11	4	144	Bob Crenshaw	Dallas Cowboys	G
1965	1	10	10	Larry Elkins	Green Bay Packers	E
1965	3	13	41	Bobby Maples	Cleveland Browns	LB
1965	13	13	181	Henry Pickett	Cleveland Browns	RB
1965	15	12	208	Harlan Lane	St. Louis Cardinals	B
1966	17	8	253	Ralph Dunlap	Detroit Lions	DE
1966	20	7	297	Willie Walker	San Francisco 49ers	WR
1967	5	9	116	Dwight Hood	Green Bay Packers	DT
1967	6	4	137	Terry Southall	Baltimore Colts	QB
1968	12	6	306	Greg Pipes	Buffalo Bills	LB
1968	15	26	407	Ridley Gibson	Green Bay Packers	DB
1969	6	23	153	Jackie Allen	Oakland Raiders	DB
1970	11	1	261	Calvin Hunt	Pittsburgh Steelers	C
1970	13	6	318	Richard Stevens	Philadelphia Eagles	T
1970	13	20	332	Walter Groth	New York Jets	DT
1970	17	17	433	Earl Maxfield	Washington Redskins	DT
1971	11	26	286	Dave Jones	Baltimore Colts	LB
1972	11	4	264	Ron Evans	Houston Oilers	T
1973	9	19	227	Ira Dean	Detroit Lions	DB
1973	15	1	365	Roger Goree	Houston Oilers	LB
1975	7	12	168	Darrel Luce	Baltimore Colts	LB
1975	7	21	177	Steve Beaird	St. Louis Cardinals	RB
1975	7	23	179	Phillip Kent	Miami Dolphins	RB
1975	17	7	423	Neal Jeffrey	San Diego Chargers	QB
1976	5	24	148	Mike Hughes	Washington Redskins	G
1976	6	8	164	Leslie Benson	Buffalo Bills	DE
1976	8	19	228	Ricky Thompson	Baltimore Colts	WR
1976	17	13	472	Pat McNeil	Kansas City Chiefs	RB
1977	1	10	10	Gary Green	Kansas City Chiefs	DB
1977	5	17	129	Gary Gregory	New York Jets	T
1977	7	3	170	Mike Nelms	Buffalo Bills	DB
1977	7	9	176	Rell Tipton	Green Bay Packers	G
1977	7	12	179	Tim Black	Detroit Lions	LB
1977	8	7	202	Cleveland Franklin	Philadelphia Eagles	RB
1978	9	12	234	Jon Kramer	Cleveland Browns	G
1978	11	15	293	Scooter Reed	Atlanta Falcons	DB
1979	1	28	28	Greg Hawthorne	Pittsburgh Steelers	RB
1979	3	9	65	Ronnie Lee	Miami Dolphins	TE
1979	4	25	107	Steve Howell	Miami Dolphins	RB
1979	7	23	188	Luke Prestridge	Denver Broncos	P
1980	4	3	86	Bill Glass	Cincinnati Bengals	G
1980	4	20	103	Arland Thompson	Chicago Bears	G
1980	6	19	157	Keith Bishop	Denver Broncos	G
1980	6	21	159	Andrew Melontree	Cincinnati Bengals	LB
1980	7	3	168	Gary Don Johnson	Cincinnati Bengals	DT
1980	7	11	176	Kirk Collins	Los Angeles Rams	DB
1980	11	25	302	Thomas Brown	Philadelphia Eagles	DE
1980	11	28	305	Frank Pollard	Pittsburgh Steelers	RB
1980	12	24	329	Howard Fields	Philadelphia Eagles	DB
1981	2	10	38	Mike Singletary	Chicago Bears	LB
1981	6	23	161	Robert Holt	Buffalo Bills	WR
1981	7	26	192	Doak Field	Philadelphia Eagles	LB
1981	8	5	198	Mike Fisher	St. Louis Cardinals	WR
1981	9	11	232	Frank Ditta	Chicago Bears	G
1982	1	12	12	Walter Abercrombie	Pittsburgh Steelers	RB
1982	3	9	64	Vann McElroy	Los Angeles Raiders	DB
1982	4	6	89	Dennis Gentry	Chicago Bears	RB
1983	2	16	44	Cedric Mack	St. Louis Cardinals	DB
1983	2	17	45	Randy Grimes	Tampa Bay Buccaneers	C
1983	3	20	76	Charles Benson	Miami Dolphins	DE
1983	4	22	106	Bo Scott Metcalf	Pittsburgh Steelers	DB
1983	7	23	191	Mark Kirchner	Pittsburgh Steelers	G
1983	10	28	279	Geff Gandy	Washington Redskins	LB
1983	12	5	312	David Mangrum	Philadelphia Eagles	QB
1984	2	22	50	Bruce Davis	Cleveland Browns	WR
1984	3	11	67	Alfred Anderson	Minnesota Vikings	RB
1984	5	28	140	Allen Rice	Minnesota Vikings	RB
1984u	1	5	5	Mark Adickes	Kansas City Chiefs	T
1984u	2	16	44	Gerald McNeil	Cleveland Browns	WR
1985	3	8	64	Ervin Randle	Tampa Bay Buccaneers	LB
1985	4	6	90	Kevin Hancock	Detroit Lions	LB
1985	10	21	273	Pat Coryatt	Chicago Bears	DT
1986	9	26	247	Reyna Thompson	Miami Dolphins	DB
1986	11	6	283	Mark Cochran	Houston Oilers	T
1987	2	11	39	Ron Francis	Dallas Cowboys	DB
1987	2	16	44	Ray Berry	Minnesota Vikings	LB
1987	3	8	64	Cody Carlson	Houston Oilers	QB
1987	4	10	94	Thomas Everett	Pittsburgh Steelers	DB
1987	6	14	154	John Adickes	Chicago Bears	C
1987	7	24	192	Johnny Thomas	Washington Redskins	DB
1988	10	24	273	Joel Porter	Chicago Bears	G
1989	4	2	86	Ray Crockett	Detroit Lions	DB
1989	10	26	277	John Simpson	Chicago Bears	WR
1990	1	12	12	James Francis	Cincinnati Bengals	LB
1990	2	9	34	Robert Blackmon	Seattle Seahawks	DB
1991	9	20	243	Charles Bell	Washington Redskins	DB
1992	4	20	104	Frankie Smith	Atlanta Falcons	DB
1992	5	20	132	Santana Dotson	Tampa Bay Buccaneers	DE
1992	10	8	260	Marcus Lowe	Cleveland Browns	DT
1992	11	14	294	Lee Miles	Miami Dolphins	WR
1992	11	17	297	Robin Jones	Atlanta Falcons	DE
1993	4	28	112	Albert Fontenot	Chicago Bears	DE
1993	6	14	154	Melvin Bonner	Denver Broncos	WR
1994	6	10	171	Robert Strait	Cleveland Browns	RB
1995	6	17	188	Steve Strahan	Carolina Panthers	DT
1996	1	20	20	Daryl Gardener	Miami Dolphins	DT
1996	4	30	125	LaCurtis Jones	Miami Dolphins	LB
1996	5	9	141	Fred Miller	St. Louis Rams	T
1996	5	32	164	Gary Bandy	Atlanta Falcons	LB
1996	7	23	232	Adrian Robinson	Indianapolis Colts	DB
1997	5	13	143	George McCullough	Houston Oilers	DB
1999	5	21	154	Derrick Fletcher	New England Patriots	T
1999	7	37	243	Kelvin Garmon	Dallas Cowboys	G
2001	2	31	62	Gary Baxter	Baltimore Ravens	DB
2003	7	29	243	Ethan Kelley	New England Patriots	DT
2005	6	25	199	Khari Long	Kansas City Chiefs	DE
2006	7	21	229	Willie Andrews	New England Patriots	DB
2007	4	13	112	Daniel Sepulveda	Pittsburgh Steelers	P
2007	7	16	226	C. J. Wilson	Carolina Panthers	DB
2009	1	2	2	Jason Smith	St. Louis Rams	T
2010	3	16	80	J. D. Walton	Denver Broncos	C
2010	6	29	198	David Gettis	Carolina Panthers	WR
2011	1	21	21	Phil Taylor	Cleveland Browns	DT
2011	1	23	23	Danny Watkins	Philadelphia Eagles	G
2011	7	13	216	Mikail Baker	St. Louis Rams	DB
2011	7	43	246	Jay Finley	Cincinnati Bengals	RB
2012	1	2	2	Robert Griffin III	Washington Redskins	QB
2012	1	20	20	Kendall Wright	Tennessee Titans	WR
2012	4	13	108	Philip Blake	Denver Broncos	C
2012	6	32	202	Terrance Ganaway	New York Jets	RB
2012	6	33	203	Robert Griffin	New York Jets	G
2012s	2	0	0	Josh Gordon	Cleveland Browns	WR
2013	3	12	74	Terrance Williams	Dallas Cowboys	WR
2014	5	13	153	Cyril Richardson	Buffalo Bills	G
2014	6	10	186	Lache Seastrunk	Washington Redskins	RB
2014	6	21	197	Demetri Goodson	Green Bay Packers	DB
2014	7	25	240	Tevin Reese	San Diego Chargers	WR
2014	7	33	248	Ahmad Dixon	Dallas Cowboys	DB
2015	4	4	103	Bryce Petty	New York Jets	QB
2015	7	7	224	Bryce Hager	St. Louis Rams	LB
2016	1	15	15	Corey Coleman	Cleveland Browns	WR
2016	2	6	38	Xavien Howard	Miami Dolphins	DB
2016	4	24	122	Andrew Billings	Cincinnati Bengals	DT
2016	5	29	168	Spencer Drango	Cleveland Browns	T
2016	6	35	210	Jimmy Landes	Detroit Lions	LS
2016	6	42	217	Rico Gathers	Dallas Cowboys	TE
2017	7	25	243	Kyle Fuller	Houston Texans	C
2019	3	3	67	Jalen Hurd	San Francisco 49ers	WR
2020	2	27	59	Denzel Mims	New York Jets	WR
2020	4	24	130	James Lynch	Minnesota Vikings	DE
2020	6	5	184	Bravvion Roy	Carolina Panthers	DT
2020	7	21	235	Clay Johnston	Los Angeles Rams	LB
2021	7	12	240	William Bradley-King	Washington Football Team	DE
2022	2	5	37	Jalen Pitre	Houston Texans	DB
2022	2	18	50	Tyquan Thornton	New England Patriots	WR
2022	3	15	79	JT Woods	Los Angeles Chargers	DB
2022	3	25	89	Terrel Bernard	Buffalo Bills	LB
2022	6	24	203	Trestan Ebner	Chicago Bears	RB
2022	7	21	242	Kalon Barnes	Carolina Panthers	DB
2023	3	35	98	Siaki Ika	Cleveland Browns	DT
2026	6	3	184	Jackie Marshall	Tennessee Titans	DT
2026	6	10	191	Josh Cameron	Jacksonville Jaguars	WR
