= Cole Hunt =

American football player (born 1995)

No. 83, 49, 81, 82
- Position: Tight end

Personal information
- Born: May 30, 1995 (age 31); Bay City, Texas
- Listed height: 6 ft 6 in (1.98 m)
- Listed weight: 254 lb (115 kg)

Career information
- High school: El Campo (TX)
- College: TCU
- NFL draft: 2018: undrafted

Career history
- Los Angeles Chargers (2018)*; San Antonio Commanders (2019); Carolina Panthers (2019)*; St. Louis BattleHawks (2020)
- * Offseason or practice squad member only

Cole Hunt (born May 30, 1995) is an American former football tight end. He was signed by the Los Angeles Chargers as an undrafted free agent in 2018. He played college football at Rice and TCU.

== Early life and career ==
Born in Bay City, Texas, Hunt grew up in El Campo, Texas, with three siblings – including current Seattle Seahawks center Joey Hunt. At El Campo High School, he was named 1st Team All-State playing defensive line as a senior in 2012 while leading the Ricebirds to a berth in the Texas 3A State Championship game.

On February 6, 2013, Hunt signed his letter of intent to play college football at Rice University in Houston, Texas. He redshirted in the 2013 season at Rice, before totalling 13 receptions for 118 yards and a touchdown for the Owls in the 2014 and 2015 seasons. After graduating from Rice in three years with a degree in sports management, Hunt transferred to TCU in Fort Worth, Texas, where his older brother Joey had just finished his own college career. At TCU, he totaled 12 receptions for 124 yards and a touchdown in his two seasons for the Horned Frogs, earning Honorable Mention All-Big 12 and 1st Team All-Academic Big 12 honors as a senior in 2017.

== Professional career ==
Pre-draft measurables
| Height | Weight | Arm length | Hand span | 40-yard dash | 10-yard split | 20-yard split | 20-yard shuttle | Three-cone drill | Vertical jump | Broad jump | Bench press |
|---|---|---|---|---|---|---|---|---|---|---|---|
| 6 ft 6 1/8 in (1.98 m) | 254 lb (115 kg) | 32 1/4 in (0.82 m) | 9 in (0.23 m) | 4.83 s | 1.72 s | 2.69 s | 4.37 s | 7.15 s | 32.0 in (0.81 m) | 9 ft 7 in (2.92 m) | 21 reps |
All values are from Pro Day

=== Los Angeles Chargers ===
After going undrafted in the 2018 NFL draft, Hunt signed with the Los Angeles Chargers on May 11, 2018, as an undrafted free agent. On September 1, 2018, he was released by the Chargers during final team cuts.

=== San Antonio Commanders ===
On December 7, 2018, Hunt signed with the San Antonio Commanders of the new Alliance of American Football.

=== Carolina Panthers ===
On April 30, 2019, Hunt signed with the Carolina Panthers. He was waived during final roster cuts on August 30, 2019.

=== St. Louis BattleHawks ===
In October 2019, Hunt was picked by the St. Louis BattleHawks in the open phase of the 2020 XFL draft. He was placed on injured reserve on February 10, 2020. He had his contract terminated when the league suspended operations on April 10, 2020.
