= El Campo High School =

Public school in El Campo Texas, United States

Coordinates: 29.2027°N 96.2818°W

Location
- 600 W. Norris; El Campo, Texas 77437; United States

Information
- Type: Public high school
- School district: El Campo Independent School District
- Principal: Demetric Wells
- Staff: 76.75 (FTE)
- Grades: 9-12
- Enrollment: 999 (2023-2024)
- Student to teacher ratio: 13.02
- Colors: Red and white
- Athletics conference: UIL Class AAAA
- Team name: Ricebirds
- Rival: Bay City High School
- Website: www.ecisd.org/page/about-us-echs

El Campo High School is a public high school located in El Campo, Texas, United States, and classified as a 4A school by the UIL. It is part of the El Campo Independent School District located in Wharton County.

== Athletics ==
=== Teams ===
El Campo competes in these sports -

- Baseball
- Boys & girls basketball
- Cross Country
- Football
- Golf
- Boys & girls soccer
- Softball
- Swimming
- Tennis
- Boys & girls track
- Volleyball

=== State championships ===
- Baseball
  - 1962 AAAA State Champions
  - 1968 AAAA State Champions
  - 1982 AAAA State Champions

== Demographics ==
55% of the student population at El Campo High School identify as Hispanic, 32% identify as Caucasian, 11% identify as African American, 1% identify as multiracial, and 1% identify as American Indian/Alaskan Native. The student body makeup is 51% male and 49% female.

== Notable alumni ==
- Arkeith Brown - former professional football defensive back
- Cole Hunt - XFL tight end for the St. Louis BattleHawks
- Joey Hunt - NFL center for the Seattle Seahawks
- Glenn Lippman - former CFL halfback for the Edmonton Eskimos
- Rueben Owens II – college football running back for the Texas A&M Aggies
- Horace Perkins - former NFL defensive back for the Kansas City Chiefs
- Vic Vasicek - NFL football player
