= Arkeith Brown =

American football player (born 1986)

No. 12, 24
- Position: Defensive back

Personal information
- Born: May 1, 1986 (age 40); Galveston, Texas, U.S.
- Listed height: 6 ft 1 in (1.85 m)
- Listed weight: 195 lb (88 kg)

Career information
- High school: El Campo (El Campo, Texas)
- College: Texas A&M
- NFL draft: 2009: undrafted

Career history
- Green Bay Blizzard (2011); Hartford Colonials (2011)*; Arizona Rattlers (2011–2017); Baltimore Brigade (2017); Arizona Rattlers (2018); Albany Empire (2018–2019)
- * Offseason or practice squad member only

Awards and highlights
- 4× ArenaBowl champion (2012–2014, 2019); United Bowl champion (2017); 2× Second-team All-Arena (2012, 2013); First-team All-IFL (2011); IFL Defensive Rookie of the Year (2011); ArenaBowl Defensive Player of the Game (2012)

Career AFL statistics
- Tackles: 358.5
- Interceptions: 33
- Pass breakups: 94
- Total TDs: 10
- Stats at ArenaFan.com

Arkeith Lamonte Brown Jr. (born May 1, 1986) is an American former professional football defensive back who played in the Arena Football League (AFL) for the Arizona Rattlers, Baltimore Brigade, and Albany Empire. He played college football at Texas A&M University.

== Early life ==
Brown attended El Campo High School in El Campo, Texas. He played for the Texas A&M Aggies from 2005 to 2008.

== Professional career ==
Brown was rated the 55th best cornerback in the 2009 NFL draft by NFLDraftScout.com.

Pre-draft measurables
Height	Weight	40-yard dash	10-yard split	20-yard split	Vertical jump	Bench press
6 ft 0 in (1.83 m)	178 lb (81 kg)	4.52 s	1.53 s	2.59 s	37 in (0.94 m)	8 reps
All values from Texas A&M Pro Day

Brown attended New Orleans Saints rookie mini-camp on a tryout basis in 2009.

Brown played for the Green Bay Blizzard of the Indoor Football League (IFL) in 2011. He earned First Team All-IFL honors, was named Defensive Rookie of the Year and led the league in interceptions with 12. He also recorded 67 total tackles and 23 pass break-ups.

Brown spent time with the Hartford Colonials of the United Football League in 2011.

Brown signed with the Arizona Rattlers of the AFL on September 28, 2011. He was named Second-Team All-Arena as a rookie after recording 83.5 tackles, 21 pass breakups and 10 interceptions in 2012. He was named Defensive Player of the Game for ArenaBowl XXV. Brown earned Second Team All-Arena honors for the second consecutive year after totaling 79.5 tackles and eight interceptions in 18 games for the Rattlers in 2013. He recorded a career-high 90.5 tackles to go along with five interceptions in 17 games in 2014. On July 8, 2017, the Rattlers defeated the Sioux Falls Storm in the United Bowl by a score of 50–41. He was released by the Rattlers on October 6, 2017.

Brown was assigned to the Baltimore Brigade on August 2, 2017.

Brown was signed by the Rattlers on February 2, 2018, released on February 8 and signed on February 13, 2018.

On July 19, 2018, Brown was assigned to the Albany Empire.
