= Francis Nelson =

Francis Nelson may refer to:

- Francis Nelson (ice hockey, born 1859) (1859–1932), Canadian ice hockey administrator
- Francis Nelson (ice hockey, born 1910) (1910–1973), American ice hockey player at the Winter Olympics
- Francis Augustus Nelson (1878–1950), architect from Montclair, New Jersey
- Francis Nelson (American football), List of Baylor Bears in the NFL draft
- Francis Nelson (judge), served 1 February 1968–14 June 1977 List of Judges of the Supreme Court of Victoria

== See also ==
- Frances Nelson (1761–1831), wife of Horatio Nelson
- Frances Nelson (actress) (1892–1975), American silent film actress
- Frank Nelson (disambiguation)
