= ECISD =

ECISD may refer to:

- East Central Independent School District, a public school district based in Bexar County, Texas (San Antonio area)
- Ector County Independent School District, a public school district based in Odessa, Texas
- El Campo Independent School District, a public school district based in El Campo, Texas
- Edinburg Consolidated Independent School District, a public school district based in Edinburg, Texas
