= Vic Vasicek =

American football player (1926–2003)

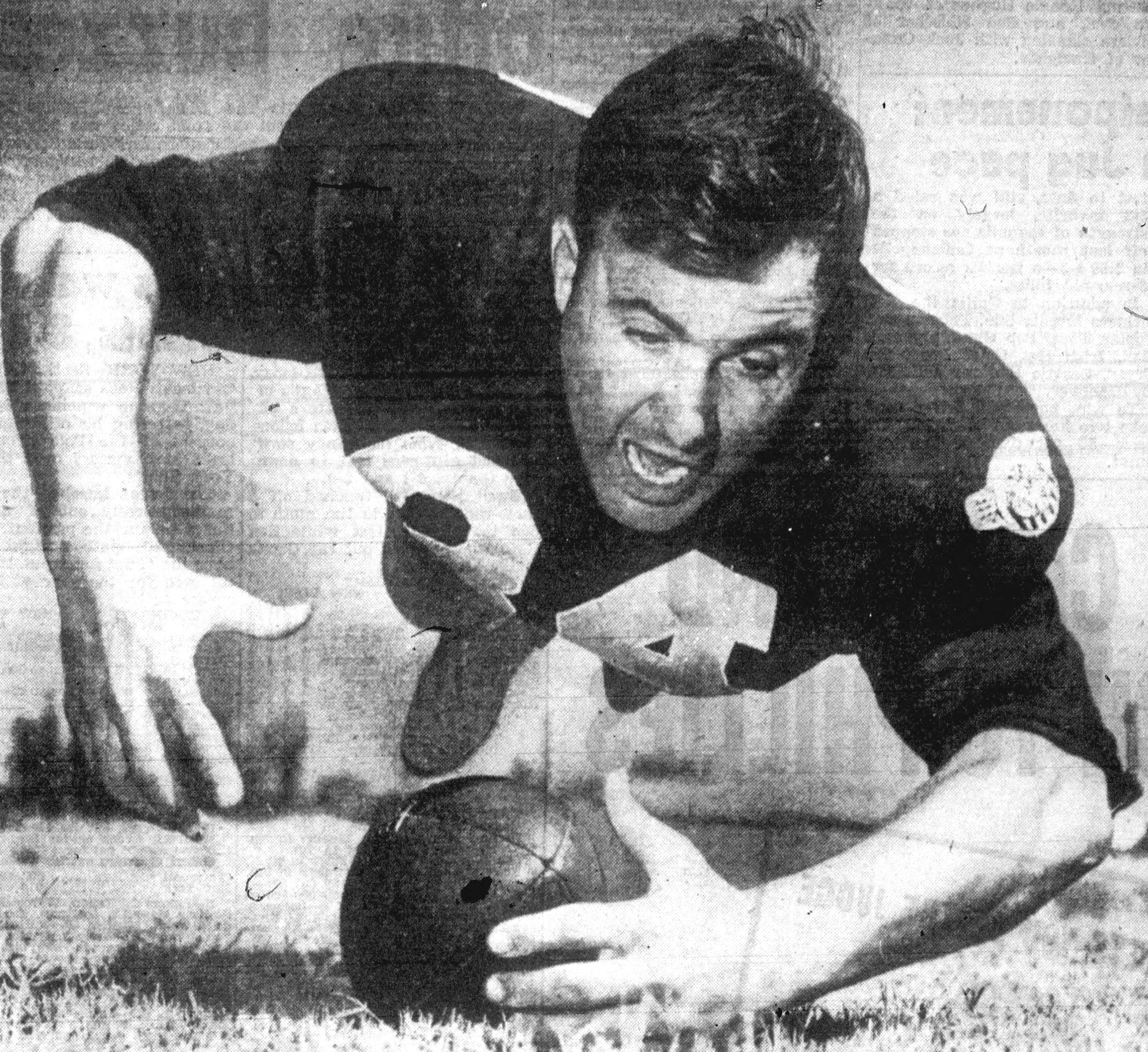
- Vasicek, circa 1950

No. 34, 35
- Positions: Defensive lineman, guard, linebacker

Personal information
- Born: May 5, 1926; El Campo, Texas, U.S.
- Died: June 20, 2003 (aged 77); Midland, Texas, U.S.
- Listed height: 5 ft 11 in (1.80 m)
- Listed weight: 223 lb (101 kg)

Career information
- High school: El Campo
- College: USC (1945); Texas (1946-1948)
- NFL draft: 1949: 10th round, 98th overall pick

Career history
- Buffalo Bills (1949); Los Angeles Rams (1950)

Career NFL/AAFC statistics
- Games played: 24
- Games started: 6
- Interceptions: 1
- Stats at Pro Football Reference

Victor Frederick Vasicek (May 5, 1926 – June 20, 2003) was an American football offensive and defensive lineman in the National Football League (NFL) for the Los Angeles Rams. He also played in the All-America Football Conference (AAFC) for the Buffalo Bills. Vasicek played college football at the University of Texas and was drafted in the tenth round of the 1949 NFL draft by the Washington Redskins.
