= Horace Perkins =

American football player (born 1954)

No. 20
- Position: Defensive back

Personal information
- Born: March 15, 1954 (age 72); El Campo, Texas, U.S.
- Listed height: 5 ft 11 in (1.80 m)
- Listed weight: 180 lb (82 kg)

Career information
- High school: El Campo (TX)
- College: Colorado
- NFL draft: 1977: 8th round, 207th overall pick

Career history
- Kansas City Chiefs (1979)
- Stats at Pro Football Reference

Horace Perkins (born March 15, 1954) is an American former professional football defensive back. He played for the Kansas City Chiefs in 1979.
