= Rueben Owens II =

American football player (born 2003)

No. 4 – Texas A&M Aggies
- Position: Running back
- Class: Redshirt Junior

Personal information
- Born: October 2, 2003 (age 23)
- Listed height: 5 ft 11 in (1.80 m)
- Listed weight: 215 lb (98 kg)

Career information
- High school: El Campo (El Campo, Texas)
- College: Texas A&M (2023–present)
- Stats at ESPN

Rueben Owens II (born October 2, 2003) is an American college football running back for the Texas A&M Aggies.

== Early life ==
Owens is from El Campo, Texas. He attended El Campo High School where he played football and became a top running back. Owens also participated in track and field and won bronze at the state long jump championship. He was the district 13-4A D-I Newcomer of the Year in 2019 and the district 12-4A D-I Offensive MVP in 2020, while being named the District 12-4A D-I MVP in 2021 and 2022. He started at running back all four years he attended El Campo.

As a senior in 2022, Owens ran for 1,781 yards and 25 touchdowns while helping El Campo to the district title. He finished his high school career with over 7,000 rushing yards and over 100 touchdowns. Owens was invited to the All-American Bowl and the Polynesian Bowl. He was ranked a five-star recruit, a top-25 prospect nationally and the number one running back prospect in the class of 2023 by 247Sports. He initially committed to play college football for the Louisville Cardinals but later decommitted and changed his commitment to the Texas A&M Aggies.

== College career ==
Owens saw immediate playing time as a true freshman at Texas A&M in 2023, running for 385 yards while also totaling 249 kick return yards and scoring three touchdowns. He posted 743 all-purpose yards to lead the true freshmen in the Southeastern Conference (SEC) and was named to the SEC All-Freshman team. He suffered a foot injury in fall camp in 2024 that caused him to miss almost the entire season. He played in two games toward the end of the season and ran for 66 yards. Owens returned in 2025 and became one of the team's top running backs. He averaged 5.4 yards per carry and finished the season with 639 rushing yards and five touchdowns.
