= Joey Hunt =

American football player (born 1994)

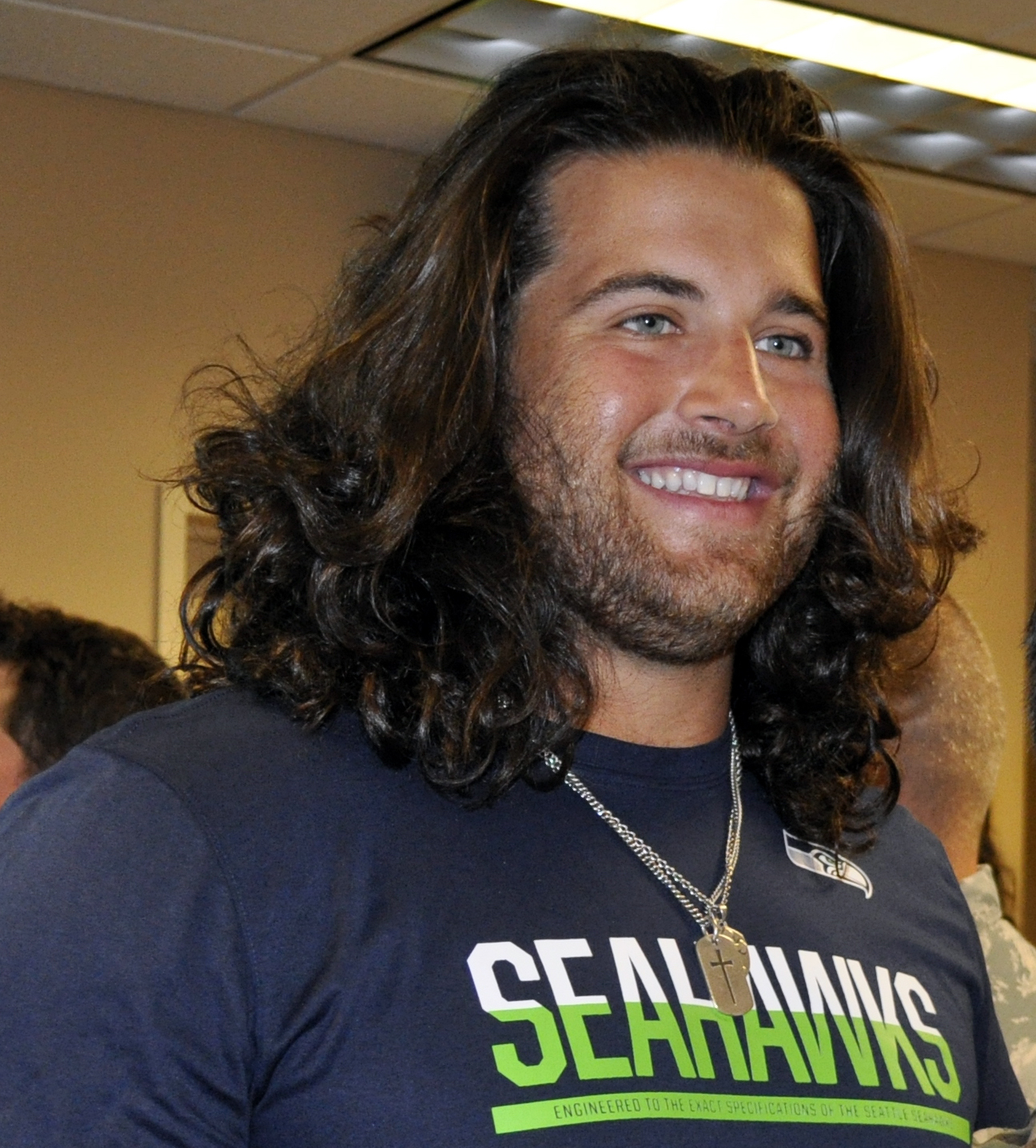
- Hunt with the Seattle Seahawks in 2016

No. 53, 68
- Position: Center

Personal information
- Born: February 22, 1994 (age 32); El Campo, Texas, U.S.
- Listed height: 6 ft 2 in (1.88 m)
- Listed weight: 299 lb (136 kg)

Career information
- High school: El Campo
- College: TCU
- NFL draft: 2016: 6th round, 215th overall pick

Career history
- Seattle Seahawks (2016–2019); Indianapolis Colts (2020–2021); Seattle Seahawks (2022–2023)

Awards and highlights
- First-team All-Big 12 (2015); Second-team All-Big 12 (2014)

Career NFL statistics
- Games played: 35
- Games started: 11
- Stats at Pro Football Reference

Joey Hunt (born February 22, 1994) is an American former professional football player who was a center in the National Football League (NFL). He was selected by the Seattle Seahawks in the sixth round of the 2016 NFL draft. He played college football for the TCU Horned Frogs.

== Early life ==
Joey Hunt was born to Tommy and Pam Hunt. Hunt attended El Campo High School in El Campo, Texas, where he graduated in 2012. His siblings are David Hunt, Cole Hunt, and Christine Hunt.

== College career ==
Hunt committed to the TCU on January 29, 2011. Hunt played all four years on the offensive line with the Horned Frogs, playing in 42 games over that span.

== Professional career ==
Pre-draft measurables
Height	Weight	Arm length	Hand span	Bench press
6 ft 1 3/4 in (1.87 m)	299 lb (136 kg)	30 in (0.76 m)	10 in (0.25 m)	34 reps
All values from Pro Day

=== Seattle Seahawks (first stint) ===
Hunt was selected by the Seattle Seahawks with the 215th overall pick in the sixth round of the 2016 NFL draft. On May 6, 2016, the Seahawks announced that they had signed Hunt to his rookie contract.

On September 2, 2017, Hunt was waived by the Seahawks and was signed to the practice squad the next day. He was promoted to the active roster on December 5, 2017.

Hunt re-signed with the Seahawks on April 23, 2020. He was released on July 26, 2020.

=== Indianapolis Colts ===
Hunt had tryouts with the Cleveland Browns on August 15, with the Detroit Lions on August 16, 2020, and with the Indianapolis Colts on August 20, 2020. He signed with the Colts on August 23, 2020. He was released on September 5, 2020, and signed to the practice squad the next day. He was elevated to the active roster on November 21, November 28, December 5, December 12, and December 19 for the team's weeks 11, 12, 13, 14, and 15 games against the Green Bay Packers, Tennessee Titans, Houston Texans, Las Vegas Raiders, and Texans, and reverted to the practice squad after each game. He was placed on the practice squad/COVID-19 list by the team on December 23, 2020, and restored to the practice squad and subsequently promoted to the active roster on January 1, 2021.

Hunt re-signed with the Colts on March 29, 2021. He was released on August 31, 2021, and re-signed to the practice squad the next day. He was released on October 14. He was re-signed to the active roster on December 28, but waived four days later.

=== Seattle Seahawks (second stint) ===
On October 5, 2022, Hunt was signed to the Seahawks' practice squad. On January 17, 2023, Hunt was signed to a reserve/future contract.

On August 29, 2023, Hunt was released by the Seahawks and re-signed to the practice squad. He was promoted to the active roster on October 21, but waived a week later and re-signed to the practice squad. He was not signed to a reserve/future contract after the season and thus became a free agent upon the expiration of his practice squad contract.
