= Heidenheimer, Texas =

Unincorporated community in Texas, US

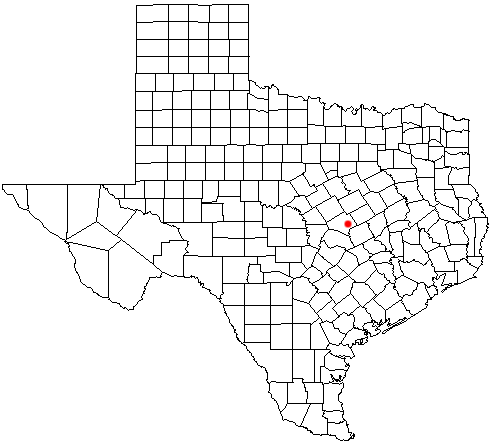
Location of Heidenheimer in the state of Texas

Heidenheimer is an unincorporated community in Bell County, Texas, United States. According to the Handbook of Texas, the community had an estimated population of 144 in 2000. The community is part of the Killeen–Temple–Fort Hood Metropolitan Statistical Area.

== Geography ==
Heidenheimer is located at 31°01′06″N 97°18′10″W. It is situated along U.S. Highway 190, approximately 5 mi (8.0 km) southeast of Temple, 51 mi (82 km) northeast of Austin, 13 mi (21 km) east of Belton, 41 mi (66 km) south of Waco, and 8 mi (13 km) northwest of Rogers in eastern Bell County.

== History ==
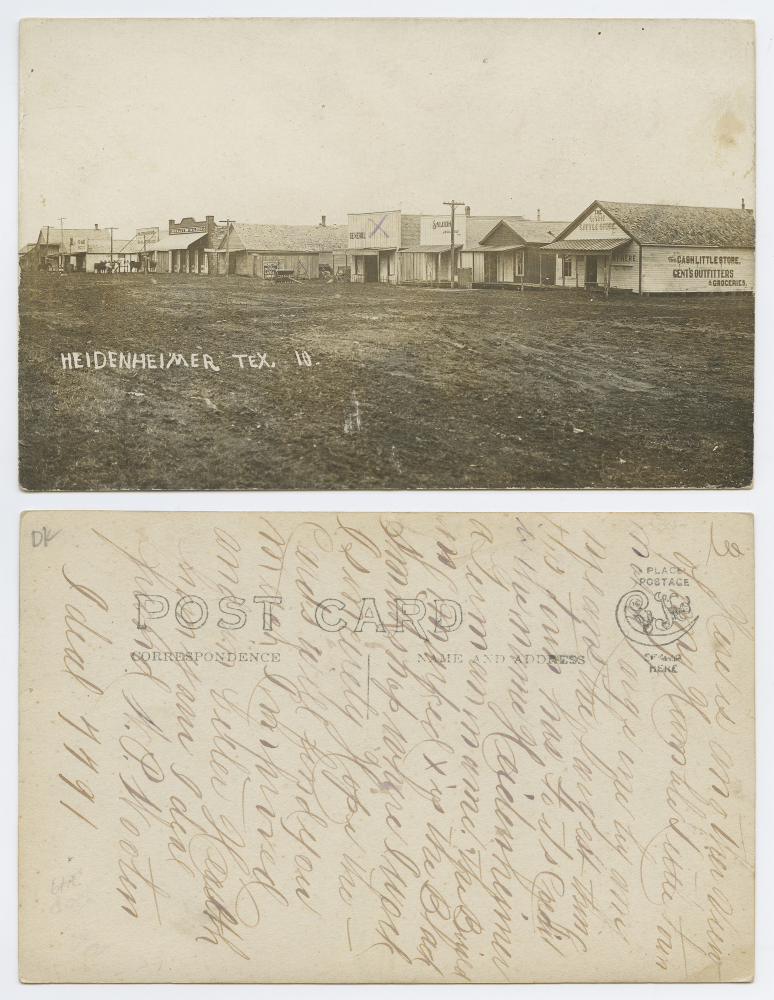
Heidenheimer 1904–1910

Heidenheimer grew up around the Atchison, Topeka, and Santa Fe Railway in 1881. The community was named in honor of S. Heidenheimer, a Galveston merchant, who had smuggled cotton for the Confederacy to British ships waiting outside of the blockaded city of Galveston; he also served as the railroad's director. In 1884, Heidenheimer had 75 inhabitants that were served by a general store, a blacksmith shop, and a church. The local economy was dominated by the shipment of cotton, corn, and oats to other markets. By 1896, the population rose to 225. Major businesses in the community included two gins, a hotel, a saloon, a lumber operation, and a newspaper (the Sun). A bank opened in the community in 1914. The population peaked at 250 in 1925. That figure had declined to 125 by the late 1940s when it had seven businesses and three churches. A slight increase was registered by 1990 when 144 people lived in the community with two businesses and remained there in 2000. Today, the railroad is the most active area of the community, with a grain elevator and a cotton gin.

Heidenheimer's post office, first established in 1881, is still operational to date (zip code: 76533).

== Education ==
Heidenheimer School, which opened in 1884, was the third largest rural school in Bell County in 1903, with a total of 149 students and three teachers. It had two schools in 1948. Public education in the community of Heidenheimer is provided by the Academy Independent School District, which is based in the nearby city of Little River-Academy.

== Notable person ==
- Bill Lucky, defensive tackle for the Green Bay Packers
