= Clair Branch =

American gridiron football player (1937–2022)

Profile
- Position: Running back

Personal information
- Born: March 30, 1937; Kenedy, Texas, U. S.
- Died: June 18, 2022 (aged 85); Houston, Texas, U.S.
- Listed height: 6 ft 1 in (1.85 m)
- Listed weight: 210 lb (95 kg)

Career information
- College: Texas
- AFL draft: 1960

Career history
- 1960–1963: Saskatchewan Roughriders
- 1963–1965: Edmonton Eskimos

Awards and highlights
- 1959 Southwest Conference Co-Champion

Clair Maurice Branch (b. March 30, 1937 - d. June 18, 2022) was an American football player who played fullback and linebacker for the Saskatchewan Roughriders and the Edmonton Eskimos of the Canadian Football League from 1960 to 1965 and was a running back for the Texas Longhorns at the college level.

== Early life ==
Branch was born in Kenedy, Texas. He played high school football and basketball and ran track at Gaston High School in Joinerville, TX from 1952-1955.

He played football as early as his sophomore year, carrying the ball as a wingback, but he missed part of the 1952 season with a broken ankle. Playing fullback in 1953 he helped them go 9-1 and nearly win the District crown. In 1954 as an All-District tailback and All-State Honorable mention, he led them to a District 16-A title and a trip to the playoffs where they won their region and made it to the State Class A Football Quarterfinals.

He ran track and helped Gaston win their district and conference in 1955 and set records in the 440 relay in 1954 and 1955.

He had two older brothers, Coe and Phil, who played football as well, with Phil being an All-SWC player at Texas.

== College career ==
Branch signed a letter of intent with the University of Texas in May of 1955 and then played college football there from 1955 to 1959. Over his three varsity seasons he rushed for a total of 565 yards and a 4.2 yards per rush average over his career.

In 1955 he played fullback and kicker for the freshman team.

The next year, he played for the Longhorn team that went 1-9, the most loses and fewest wins of any team in program history. He saw most of his playing time later in the season, with his best game against Texas A&M, and finished with 4.4 yards per carry with 201 yards on 46 carries.

He was on the roster for the 1957 season, but was held out due to injuries. He missed the start of spring training after breaking his foot in a skiing accident and during spring training he injured his ankle and it lingered all season. Over the summer he had an appendectomy. At the end of the preseason he suffered a back injury.

In 1958, he was a reserve running back who played in 8 games, carrying the ball 30 times for 83 yards and had 1 reception for 24 yards. He also played defense where he had 14 tackles and a 90 yard interception return for a TD against Rice in 1958 that is still tied for the 5th longest interception return and interception return for a TD in school history (and tied for 5th for most interception return yards in a single game). It was the only points Texas scored in that game. He had another season-best game against Texas A&M. In Darrell Royal's 2nd season he helped Texas to a 7-3 record.

In his senior year, he played in every game. He had 281 yards rushing on 59 carries with 2 TDs, and on defense he had 23 tackles and a fumble recovery. His 86 yard rushing game against SMU earned him a nomination of "Back of the Week." Against Baylor, he scored the game-winning touchdown late in the 4th quarter. He helped Texas win a share of the Southwest Conference Championship and go to the 1960 Cotton Bowl Classic where they faced off against #1 Syracuse and Heisman Trophy winner Ernie Davis. Branch was the game's leading rusher in the losing effort. He came in 10th in All-SWC voting for backs.

He graduated with a degree in personal management.

== Professional career ==
=== Saskatchewan Roughriders ===
He was drafted by the Houston Oilers in the 1960 AFL draft but a month later he signed with the Saskatchewan Roughriders in the CFL where the salaries were competitive at the time and where his older brother, Phil, had played. Before starting play there he went on a six-month tour of duty with the National Guard.

He was late for camp his first year because of his Army service but he was able to become a starter and have the best year of his career. He played in every game but one that he missed with an injury, rushed for 514 yards, including a career long 28 yard rush, on 107 attempts for a 4.8 yards per rush average and 4 touchdowns. He also had 18 receptions on 19 targets, including a career long 35 yard catch, for 192 yards and a touchdown. He had his only career kickoff return and played linebacker. At the end of the season, he was the team's nominee for the Most Outstanding Player award, on a team that came in last place.

He was re-signed by the Roughriders in June of 1961. He injured his knee in the 2nd exhibition game and missed seven games. When he did return he played almost exclusively at the linebacker position. He missed the last two games with another injury. With so many missed games his numbers were down as he rushed for just 149 yards on 26 carries with one touchdown, 2 receptions for 39 yards, a punt return and a fumble. The Riders finished out of the postseason again with a 5-10-1 record.

In June of 1962 he re-signed with the Roughriders. He did not play in the first three games of the season and when he did, he played mostly linebacker, but he came off the bench to replace fellow Texan Ferd Burket as running back against Ottawa in October. That game led to an injury and he missed the last three regular season games and the two playoff games as a result (During which they went 1-4). In games he played, they went 6-2-1 and he helped them make it to the Western Conference semi-finals.

In 1963, he returned to the Roughriders but only after holding out for more money. In the preseason he was the team's primary rusher but by the first game he was back to playing defense. He was benched, and even put on waivers (and claimed by the Eskimos) but recalled before the 72 hour waiver period expired. He returned to play on August 23, when he played fullback for the only time that season in place of an injured George Reed. He rushed for 75 yards on 24 carries in that game, then saw playing time in one more game before he was waived on September 14th.

=== Edmonton Eskimos ===
After being cut by the Roughriders, Branch was again claimed by the Edmonton Eskimos in September 1963 and this time signed after the 72 hour waiting period. He suffered a leg injury in his second game with the Eskimos and missed the next 5 games before returning to play against the Stampeders for the final two games of the season.

He was re-signed by the Eskimos in 1964 but was injured in the preseason and wasn't able to play until September. He played in one game with them - at offensive guard - before being cut by the team on September 9, 1964 and returned to Austin a few days later.

== Later life ==
In 1962 he joined his brothers and other players in founding the Southwest Challenge Bowl - an All-Star game played in Corpus Christi pitting Texas/SWC players against a college players from the rest of the country - that was played in 1963 and 1964. He later served on the player selection committee for the bowl game.

Branch continued taking classes at Texas in between trips to Canada and graduated in June or 1963. In December of 1963 he married Emily Neece, a UT classmate.

After football, Branch pursued a lifelong career in the concrete pipe manufacturing business in Houston.
