= Tom Stolhandske =

American football player (1931–2025)

No. 75, 86
- Positions: Tight end, defensive end

Personal information
- Born: June 28, 1931; Baytown, Texas, U.S.
- Died: November 1, 2025 (aged 94)
- Listed height: 6 ft 2 in (1.88 m)
- Listed weight: 210 lb (95 kg)

Career information
- High school: Robert E. Lee (Baytown)
- College: Texas (1949–1952)
- NFL draft: 1953: 1st round, 10th overall pick

Career history
- Edmonton Eskimos (1953); San Francisco 49ers (1955)

Awards and highlights
- First-team All-American (1952); First-team All-SWC (1952); Second-team All-SWC (1951)

Career NFL statistics
- Interceptions: 1
- Fumble recoveries: 1
- Stats at Pro Football Reference

Carl Thomas Stolhandske (June 28, 1931 – November 1, 2025) was an American professional football player for the San Francisco 49ers of the National Football League (NFL) and the Edmonton Eskimos of the Western Interprovincial Football Union. He played college football for the Texas Longhorns.

== Early life and education ==
Carl Thomas Stolhandske was born on June 28, 1931, in Baytown, Texas. He attended Robert E. Lee High School in Baytown.

Stolhandske was a member of the Texas Longhorns at The University of Texas from 1949 to 1952 and a three-year letterman from 1950 to 1952. At Texas, Stolhandske was a first-team All-American defensive end who played on two Southwest Conference championship teams, went to the Cotton Bowl twice and won it in 1953. He also played end and had a 123-yard receiving game against North Carolina in 1952 (including a 62-yard touchdown reception). After college he played in the 1953 Hula Bowl.

== Professional career ==
Stolhandske was selected by the San Francisco 49ers in the first round, with the 10th overall pick, of the 1953 NFL draft. However, he instead signed with the Edmonton Eskimos of the Western Interprovincial Football Union on March 26, 1953. He dressed in 14 games for the Eskimos during the 1953 season, catching 19 passes for 382 yards and four touchdowns.

In December 1953, he was drafted into the Army and put his football career on hold. When he finished his military duty, he signed with the 49ers on January 20, 1955, as a defensive end. He played in all 12 games, starting three, for the 49ers in 1955, recording one interception and one fumble recovery. He became a free agent after the season.

== Death ==
Stolhandske died on November 1, 2025, at the age of 94.

== See also ==
- List of Texas Longhorns football All-Americans
