= Academy Independent School District =

School district in Texas

Location
- 704 E. Main St. Little River-Academy, Texas ESC Region 12 USA
- Coordinates: 30°58′55″N 97°20′40″W

District information
- Type: Independent school district
- Motto: There is Love in every Bee
- Grades: Pre-K through 12
- Superintendent: Billy Harlan
- Schools: 5 (2009-10)
- NCES District ID: 4807470

Students and staff
- Students: 1,108 (2010-2011
- Teachers: 81.00 (2009-10) (on full-time equivalent (FTE) basis)
- Student–teacher ratio: 13.27 (2009-10)
- Athletic conference: UIL Class 2A Football Division I
- District mascot: Bumblebees
- Colors: Forest Green, Gold

Other information
- TEA District Accountability Rating for 2011-12: Recognized
- Website: Academy ISD

Academy Independent School District is a school district based in Little River-Academy, Texas (USA). In addition to Little River-Academy, the district also serves the community of Heidenheimer.

== Finances ==
As of the 2010-2011 school year, the appraised valuation of property in the district was $223,244,000. The maintenance tax rate was $0.104 and the bond tax rate was $0.013 per $100 of appraised valuation.

== Academic achievement ==
In 2011, the school district was rated "recognized" by the Texas Education Agency. Thirty-five percent of districts in Texas in 2011 received the same rating. No state accountability ratings will be given to districts in 2012. A school district in Texas can receive one of four possible rankings from the Texas Education Agency: Exemplary (the highest possible ranking), Recognized, Academically Acceptable, and Academically Unacceptable (the lowest possible ranking).

Historical district TEA accountability ratings

- 2011: Recognized
- 2010: Recognized
- 2009: Exemplary
- 2008: Academically Acceptable
- 2007: Academically Acceptable
- 2006: Recognized
- 2005: Recognized
- 2004: Academically Acceptable

== Schools ==
In the 2011-2012 school year, the district had students in five schools.

Regular instructional

- Academy High School (Grades 9-12)
  - The principal in the 2011-2012 school year was Alex Remschel.
- Academy Middle School (Grades 5-8)
- Academy Elementary School (Grades Pre-K-4)

Alternative instructional

- Bell County Alternative School

JJAEP instructional (Grades 7-12)

- Academy JJAEP (Grades 5-12)

== Special programs ==
=== Athletics ===
Academy High School participates in the boys sports of baseball, basketball, football, and soccer. The school participates in the girls sports of basketball, softball, and volleyball. For the 2012 through 2014 school years, Academy High School will play football in UIL Class 2A Division I.

== See also ==
- List of school districts in Texas
- List of high schools in Texas
