= 1952 All-Southwest Conference football team =

American college football all-star team

The 1952 All-Southwest Conference football team consists of American football players chosen by various organizations for All-Southwest Conference teams for the 1952 college football season. The selectors for the 1952 season included the Associated Press (AP) and the United Press (UP). Players selected as first-team players by both the AP and UP are designated in bold.

== All Southwest selections ==
=== Backs ===
- Ray Graves, Texas A&M (UP-1)
- **Gib Dawson**, Texas (UP-1)(AP-1)
- Jerry Coody, Baylor (UP-1)
- **Dick Ochoa**, Texas (UP-1)(AP-1)
- T. Jones, Texas (AP-1)
- Billy Quinn, Texas (AP-1)
- Jerry Norton, SMU (AP-1)

(Norton, Jones and Quinn tied for the last two spots on the AP team)

=== Ends ===
- **Tom Stolhandske**, Texas (UP-1)(AP-1)
- Bob Blair, TCU (AP-1)

=== Tackles ===
- Bill Forester, SMU (UP-1)
- Bill Crockett, Rice (AP-1)
- Bob Knowles, Baylor (AP-1)

=== Guards ===
- **Harley Sewell**, Texas (UP-1)(AP-1)
- Phil Branch, Texas (AP-1)

=== Centers ===
- **Jack Sisco**, Baylor (UP-1)(AP-1)

=== Defensive Ends ===
- Wayne Martin, TCU (UP-1)
- Bill Georges, Texas (AP-1)

=== Defensive Tackles ===
- **Jack Little**, Texas A&M (UP-1)(AP-1)
- Morgan Williams, TCU (AP-1)

=== Defensive Guards ===
- **Bill Athay**, Baylor (UP-1) (AP-1)
- Dick Chapman, Rice (AP-1)

=== Linebackers ===
- Don Rhoden, Rice (AP-1)
- Bill Forester, SMU (AP-1)

=== Halfbacks ===
- Val Joe Walker, SMU (AP-1)
- Ronald Fraley, TCU (AP-1)

=== Safety ===
- Joe Boring, Texas A&M (AP-1)

== Key ==
AP = Associated Press

UP = United Press

Bold = Consensus first-team selection of both the AP and UP

== See also ==
- 1952 College Football All-America Team
