= Bob Griffin (linebacker) =

American football player (1929–2012)

No. 58, 47, 55
- Positions: Linebacker, center

Personal information
- Born: February 12, 1929; Fort Worth, Texas, U.S.
- Died: February 25, 2012 (aged 83); Chattanooga, Tennessee, U.S.
- Listed height: 6 ft 3 in (1.91 m)
- Listed weight: 235 lb (107 kg)

Career information
- High school: Frederick (Frederick, Oklahoma)
- College: Arkansas (1948–1951)
- NFL draft: 1952: 2nd round, 25th overall pick

Career history

Playing
- Los Angeles Rams (1953–1957); Calgary Stampeders (1959); St. Louis Cardinals (1961)

Coaching
- Montreal Alouettes (1967–1968) Assistant coach; Atlanta Falcons (1969–1974) Defensive line coach; Saskatchewan Roughriders (1978) Defensive line / linebackers coach

Awards and highlights
- First-team All-SWC (1951)

Career NFL statistics
- Games played: 49
- Games started: 28
- Interceptions: 1
- Fumble recoveries: 2
- Safeties: 1
- Stats at Pro Football Reference

Robert Lloyd Griffin (February 12, 1929 – February 25, 2012) was an American professional football player who played linebacker and center for six seasons for the Los Angeles Rams and St. Louis Cardinals of the National Football League (NFL). Griffin played college football at the University of Arkansas and was selected in the second round of the 1952 NFL draft by the Los Angeles Rams.
