= Don Armes =

United States Republican politician

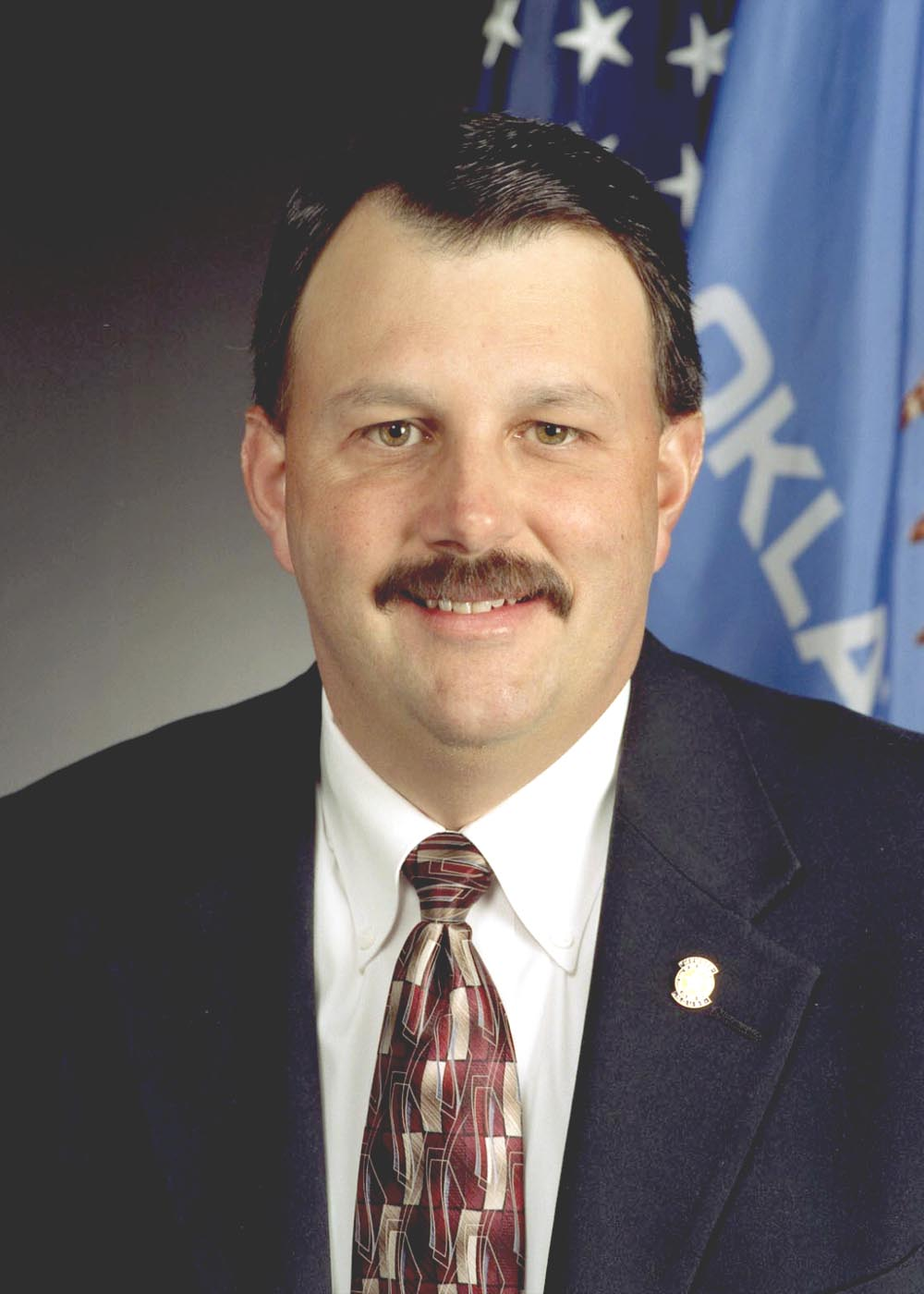

Member of the Oklahoma House of Representatives from the 63rd district
- In office 2002–2014
- Preceded by: Loyd Benson
- Succeeded by: Jeff Coody

Personal details
- Born: Donald Lee Armes; 31 July 1961 (age 65) Midwest City, Oklahoma, U.S.
- Party: Republican
- Spouse: Dede Armes
- Children: 2
- Education: Cameron University
- Profession: Farmer, auctioneer

Don Armes (born July 31, 1961) is a United States Republican politician from U.S. state of Oklahoma. Armes served in the Oklahoma House of Representatives, representing state House District 63. He was first elected to the seat in 2002.

== Early life and career ==
Armes was born in Midwest City, Oklahoma to Donald C. Armes and Elaine O. (Oliver) Bennett. He attended Cameron University, where he studied agricultural education and animal science. Armes worked as a broadcaster for KSWO-TV from 1999 to 2002, as an agriculture educator in Lawton and continues to work as a farmer and auctioneer today.

== Political career and controversy ==
Armes has represented his district as a conservative lawmaker with a focus on issues that affect rural Oklahomans, and received a rating of 100% from the Oklahoma Farm Bureau. He has consistently supported legislation which would restrict abortion access. Armes has consistently voted against embryonic stem cell research, for tax relief and government modernization. In 2014, his last year in office, Armes was embroiled in a controversy involving efforts to sabotage the Oklahoma Department of Environmental Quality. It was also widely alleged that Armes conspired with insiders at the Department of Environmental Quality, and that he engaged in romantic relationships with one of those Department of Environmental Quality employees.

== Personal life ==
Armes currently lives in Faxon, Oklahoma with his wife, Dede. They have two children, Katy and Kelsey Armes.

== Organizations ==
- National Rifle Association
- Oklahoma Cattlemen's Association
- Tillman County Ducks Unlimited

== District ==
House District 63 encompasses Tillman County and the western half of Comanche County. Most of the district is rural.
