= Phil Branch =

Canadian football player (1932–2019)

Profile
- Position: Guard

Personal information
- Born: November 6, 1932; Henderson, Texas, U.S.
- Died: March 16, 2019 (aged 86); Briarcliff, Texas, U.S.
- Listed height: 6 ft 0 in (1.83 m)
- Listed weight: 205 lb (93 kg)

Career information
- High school: Gaston (Joinerville, Texas)
- College: Texas
- NFL draft: 1954: 9th round, 105th overall pick

Career history
- 1956: Saskatchewan Roughriders

Awards and highlights
- First-team All-SWC (1952, 1953); 1952 Southwest Conference Champion; 1953 Cotton Bowl Classic Champion; 1953 Southwest Conference Co-Champion.

Joseph Philip Branch (November 6, 1932 – March 16, 2019) was an American professional football player who played for the Saskatchewan Roughriders.

== Early life ==
Branch was born in Henderson, TX and played high school football at Gaston High School in Joinerville, TX.

== College Football ==
He went to Texas where he was a 3-year letterman, first at halfback, then fullback and in his senior season as a guard. He also kicked for the team. He helped Texas, as an all-conference player, to win the Southwest Conference Championship and Cotton Bowl in 1952. Then he helped the team to a share of the conference Championship in 1953 when he was first-team All-Conference, and All-American Honorable Mention. He was a second team all-conference selection in 1952.

In 1954 he was invited to the College All-Star Football game in Chicago and the East-West Shrine game, but had to miss the latter with a muscle injury.

== Pro Football ==
He was drafted by the Philadelphia Eagles in the 9th Round of the 1954 NFL draft (#105 overall). He was signed by them that year. But he was drafted into the Army in 1954 and spend the next two years playing football for the Army.

When his service was over he played in Canada with the Roughriders in 1956. The Roughriders went to the Western Interprovincial Football Union Championship that season, losing the WIFU best-of-three Championship 2–1.

== Later life ==
He returned to Texas when his football career was over and served as President of the Houston Golf Association in 1975 and worked as the Golf Pro at Del Rio’s San Felipe Country Club. He was also active in the Houston Livestock Show and Rodeo.

His younger brother Clair also played football at Gaston HS, Texas and for Saskatchewan.
