= Harley Sewell =

American football player (1931–2011)

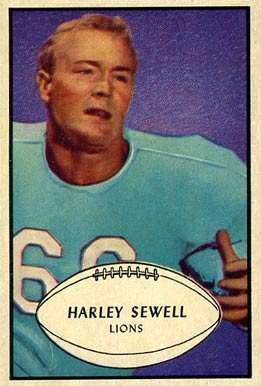
- Sewell on a 1953 Bowman football card

No. 66
- Positions: Guard, linebacker

Personal information
- Born: April 18, 1931; Jefferson County, Oklahoma, U.S.
- Died: December 17, 2011 (aged 80); Arlington, Texas, U.S.
- Listed height: 6 ft 1 in (1.85 m)
- Listed weight: 230 lb (104 kg)

Career information
- College: Texas (1949–1952)
- NFL draft: 1953: 1st round, 13th overall pick

Career history
- Detroit Lions (1953–1962); Los Angeles Rams (1963)

Awards and highlights
- 2× NFL champion (1953, 1957); Second-team All-Pro (1957); 4× Pro Bowl (1957-1959, 1962); Detroit Lions 75th Anniversary Team; First-team All-American (1952); 2× First-team All-SWC (1951, 1952)

Career NFL statistics
- Games played: 122
- Games started: 112
- Fumble recoveries: 10
- Stats at Pro Football Reference
- College Football Hall of Fame

Harley Edward Sewell (April 18, 1931 – December 17, 2011) was an American professional football player who was a guard in the National Football League (NFL) for the Detroit Lions from 1953 to 1962, and the Los Angeles Rams in 1963. He was born in Jefferson County, Oklahoma, and played college football for the Texas Longhorns.

He and his wife, Jean (Moloney), had three children. They resided in Arlington, Texas. He died Saturday, December 17, 2011.

== College career ==
At the University of Texas at Austin, Sewell was an outstanding linebacker, however, the Lions drafted him as an offensive guard. He was the Lions’ first round draft pick in 1953. Used in the role of pulling guard, Sewell "was noted for his extreme hustle" and speed in blocking. Later, he was referred to as "a 'hillbilly' kid."

== Professional career ==
A member of the Lion teams during the 1950s and early 1960s, Harley was the best draft choice for Detroit out of any choices in 1953. He moved immediately into the starting spot at right guard as a rookie and remained there for the next ten campaigns. A tireless worker, Harley was one of the toughest and most conditioned Lions of his era. He once said at the peak of his career, "(I) never feel like I have a job cinched." While that attitude may have served to motivate him, his abilities were never questioned by either teammates or his coaches. "Harley has hustled for us every minute since he joined the Lions," said his former line coach Aldo Forte.

The 6-foot, 1-inch, 230-pound Sewell was a complete guard, equally skilled at either pass or run blocking. He was at his best when leading the running back on sweeps, inside traps, and counter plays. Harley's quick feet and acceleration allowed him to clear out larger defenders before they had time to counter his attack. Sewell was also a standout on special teams throughout his career. A regular on the punting and kickoff teams, he was once credited with 85% of the team's tackles on the kickoff unit in one season. Harley was a four-time Pro Bowl nominee during his career, making the season-ending trip after the 1957, 1958, 1959, and 1962 campaigns. He was inducted into the College Football Hall of Fame in 2000.
