= Glenn Lippman =

Canadian football player (born 1929)

Profile
- Position: Halfback

Personal information
- Born: December 1, 1929 (age 96); Yoakum, Texas, U.S.
- Listed height: 5 ft 8 in (1.73 m)
- Listed weight: 170 lb (77 kg)

Career information
- High school: El Campo (TX)
- College: Texas A&M
- NFL draft: 1952: 22nd round, 256th overall pick

Career history
- 1954: Edmonton Eskimos

Awards and highlights
- Grey Cup champion (1954); First-team All-SWC (1951)

Glenn Edward Lippman (born December 1, 1929) is an American former professional Canadian football player who played for the Edmonton Eskimos. He won the Grey Cup with the Eskimos in 1954. Lippman was born in Texas and attended Texas A&M University.

Inducted to the Alberta Sports Hall of Fame and Museum in 2007 as a member of the 1954-1956 Edmonton Eskimos Football Teams.
