= Frank Nelson =

Frank Nelson may refer to:

- Sir Frank Nelson (British politician) (1883–1966), British civil servant and politician
- Frank Nelson (athlete) (1887–1970), American athlete and baseball player
- Frank Nelson (actor) (1911–1986), American radio and television actor
- Frank Nelson (Western Samoan politician) (1917–1967), Western Samoan politician
- Frank Nelson (priest) (born 1955), Anglican Dean of Adelaide
- Frank Nelson (Argentinian actor) (born 1930), German-born Argentinian actor featured in Closed Door, Enigma de mujer or Graciela

== See also ==
- Francis Nelson (disambiguation)
