= 1951 All-Southwest Conference football team =

American college football all-star team

The 1951 All-Southwest Conference football team consists of American football players chosen by various organizations for All-Southwest Conference teams for the 1950 college football season. The selectors for the 1951 season included the Associated Press (AP) and the United Press (UP). Players selected as first-team players by both the AP and UP are designated in bold.

== Offensive selections ==
=== Backs ===
- **Larry Isbell**, Baylor (AP-1; UP-1)
- **Gib Dawson**, Texas (AP-1; UP-1)
- Lamar McHam, Arkansas (AP-1; UP-2)
- Ray McKowan, Texas Christian (AP-1; UP-2)
- Glenn Lippman, Texas A&M (UP-1)
- Teddy Riggs, Rice (UP-1)
- Bobby Jack Floyd, TCU (UP-2)
- Bob Smith, Texas A&M (UP-3)

=== Ends ===
- **Bill Howton**, Rice (AP-1; UP-1)
- **Stan Williams**, Baylor (AP-1; UP-1)
- Harold Riley, Baylor (UP-2)
- Tom Stolhandske, Texas (UP-2)

=== Tackles ===
- **Jack Little**, Texas A&M (AP-1; UP-1)
- Dave Hanner, Arkansas (AP-1; UP-3)
- Ken Casner, Baylor (UP-2)
- Doug Conaway, TCU (UP-2)

=== Guards ===
- **Harley Sewell**, Texas (AP-1; UP-1)
- Herschel Forester, Southern Methodist (AP-1; UP-3)
- June Davis, Texas (UP-2)

=== Centers ===
- Hugh Meyer, Texas A&M (AP-1; UP-2)

== Defensive selections ==
=== Defensive ends ===
- **Bill Howton**, Rice (AP-1; UP-1)
- Paul Williams, Texas (AP-1)

=== Defensive tackles ===
- **Bob Griffin**, Arkansas (AP-1; UP-1)
- Bill Forester, Southern Methodist (AP-1; UP-3)

=== Defensive guards ===
- **Bill Athey**, Baylor (AP-1; UP-1)
- Herb Zimmerman, Texas Christian (AP-1; UP-2)

=== Linebackers ===
- **Dick Hightower**, Southern Methodist (AP-1; UP-1)
- Keith Flowers, Texas Christian (AP-1)

=== Defensive backs ===
- Bobby Dillon, Texas (AP-1; UP-2)
- Yale Lary, Texas A&M (AP-1)
- Bill Burkhalter, Rice (AP-1)

== Key ==
AP = Associated Press

UP = United Press

Bold = Consensus first-team selection of both the AP and UP

== See also ==
- 1951 College Football All-America Team
