= Trey Caldwell (politician) =

American politician

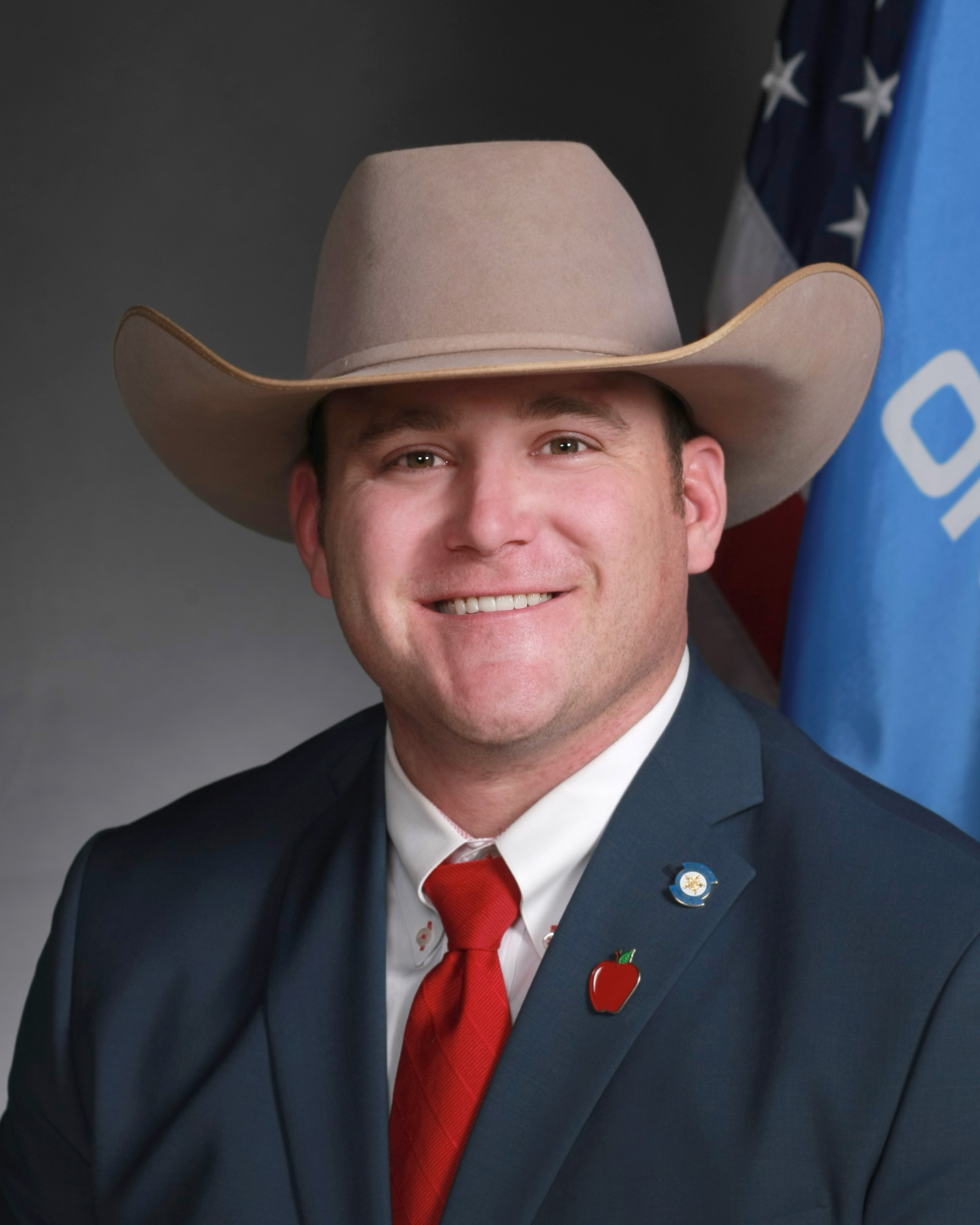

Deputy Majority Leader of the Oklahoma House of Representatives
- Incumbent
- Assumed office January 5, 2021

Member of the Oklahoma House of Representatives from the 63rd district
- Incumbent
- Assumed office January 14, 2019
- Preceded by: Jeff Coody

Personal details
- Born: Hurchel E. Caldwell III; December 24, 1988 (age 37) Oklahoma, U.S.
- Citizenship: American; Choctaw Nation
- Party: Republican
- Education: Cameron University (BA)

Hurchel "Trey" E. Caldwell III (born December 24, 1988) is an American politician serving as a member of the Oklahoma House of Representatives from the 63rd district. He was elected in November 2018, and assumed office on January 14, 2019. He is of Choctaw descent.

== Early life and education ==
Caldwell is a native of Oklahoma. He graduated from MacArthur High School and earned a Bachelor of Arts degree from Cameron University in 2013.

== Career ==
Outside of politics, Caldwell has worked as a financial advisor for Merrill Lynch. He was elected to the Oklahoma House of Representatives in November 2018 and assumed office on January 14, 2019. During the 2019–2020 legislative session, he served as vice chair of the House Energy & Natural Resources Committee. He has since served as vice chair of the House Business and Commerce Committee. In 2020, he was re-elected by default.

He was one of twenty Oklahoma lawmakers who endorsed Ron DeSantis for the 2024 presidential election.
