= Academy High School =

Location
- 602 East Main Street; Little River, Bell County, Texas 76554; United States
- Coordinates: 30.982889°N 97.345609°W

Information
- School type: Public high school
- Locale: Rural: Fringe
- School district: Academy ISD
- NCES School ID: 480747000040
- Principal: Logan Chaney
- Staff: 41.79 (on an FTE basis)
- Grades: 9–12
- Enrollment: 539 (2023–2024)
- Student to teacher ratio: 12.90
- Colors: Green & Gold
- Athletics conference: UIL Class 3A
- Mascot: Bee/Lady Bee
- Website: Academy ISD

Academy High School is a 3A public high school located in Little River, Texas, United States. It is part of the Academy Independent School District located in southern Bell County. During 2023–2024, Academy High School had an enrollment of 539 students and a student to teacher ratio of 12.90. The school received an overall rating of "B" from the Texas Education Agency for the 2024–2025 school year.

== Athletics ==
The Academy Bumblebees compete in the following sports:

- Baseball
- Basketball
- Cross Country
- Football
- Golf
- Marching Band
- Powerlifting
- Softball
- Tennis
- Track and Field
- Volleyball
- Soccer

=== State titles ===
- Basketball Boys 2A 2002
- Softball 3A 2017
- One Act Play 3A 2017
- Boys Tennis-Doubles 3A 2021, Samuel and Jonathan Golovin
