= Ken Casner =

American football player (1930–2009)

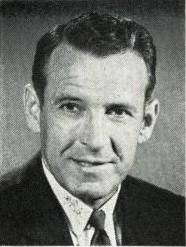
- Casner in 1969

No. 79, 65
- Position: Defensive tackle

Personal information
- Born: January 23, 1930; Fort Scott, Kansas, U.S.
- Died: August 19, 2009 (aged 79); Waco, Texas, U.S.
- Listed height: 6 ft 2 in (1.88 m)
- Listed weight: 245 lb (111 kg)

Career information
- High school: Waco
- College: Baylor (1948–1951)
- NFL draft: 1952: 4th round, 40th overall pick

Career history
- Los Angeles Rams (1952); Saskatchewan Roughriders (1956)

Awards and highlights
- Second-team All-SWC (1951)

Career NFL statistics
- Fumble recoveries: 1
- Total touchdowns: 1
- Stats at Pro Football Reference

Kenneth Wayne Casner (January 23, 1930 – August 19, 2009) was an American professional football defensive tackle. He played for the Los Angeles Rams in 1952.
