= Jeff Coody =

American politician

Member of the Oklahoma House of Representatives from the 63rd district
- In office November 18, 2014 – November 15, 2018
- Preceded by: Don Armes
- Succeeded by: Trey Caldwell

Personal details
- Born: September 13, 1960 (age 65)
- Party: Republican
- Parent: Ann Coody (mother)

Jeff Coody (born September 13, 1960) is an American politician who served in the Oklahoma House of Representatives for the 63rd district from 2014 to 2018.

== Career ==
After assuming office, Coody sponsored HB2040, "Oklahoma Safe Schools Act," passed both the House and the Senate, was signed by Governor Fallin and became effective on May 12, 2015. The Oklahoma Rifle Association honored Coody as "2015 Representative of the Year" at the 2015 ORA convention in Midwest City.

Coody authored a bill to nullify the state's requirements for registration of handguns, claiming that citizens already had a constitutional right to open carry guns. It was an uphill fight that ultimately resulted in passing the so-called "Constitutional Carry Bill" that would allow anyone in the state to carry a gun without a license, provided that person was over 21 years old and had no felony conviction. It would also eliminate the requirement for background checks. The law was passed by the House on April 25, 2018.

In 2018, he strongly opposed a bill in the state house that would raise the pay for state school teachers, and he angered many voters (especially students, parents and teachers) by saying the teachers were engaged in extortion by calling for a walkout to display their unhappiness with low salaries for Oklahoma educators. The walkout failed to sway enough Republican legislators to increase the education budget for the first time in a decade.

On August 28, 2018, he was defeated in the Republican primary for the 63rd district.
