= Ann Coody =

American politician (born 1937)

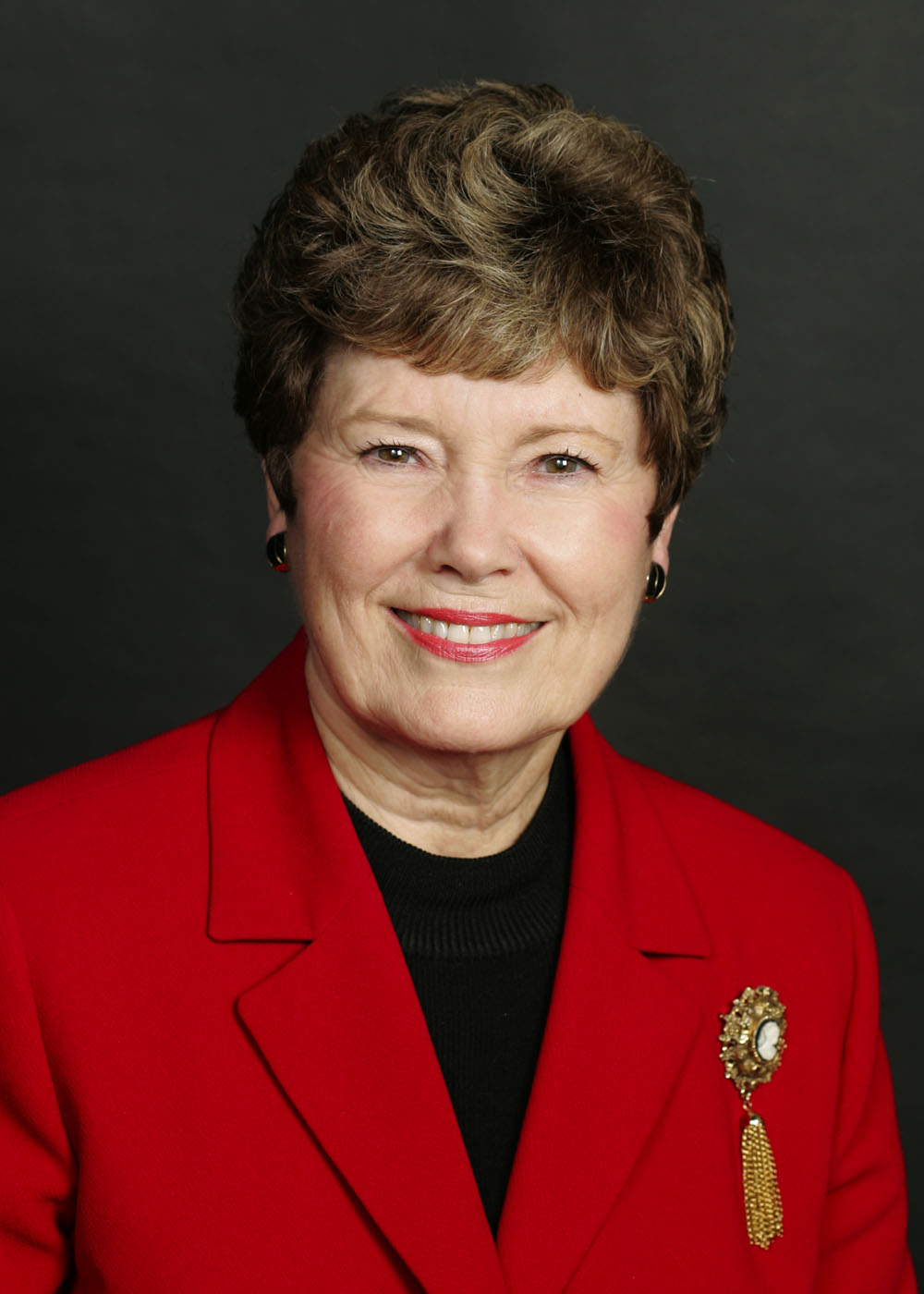

Member of the Oklahoma House of Representatives from the 64th district
- In office 2004–2016
- Preceded by: Ron Kirby
- Succeeded by: Rande Worthen

Personal details
- Born: December 12, 1937 (age 88) Shreveport, Louisiana, U.S.
- Party: Republican
- Spouse: Dale Coody
- Children: Jeff Coody (son)
- Education: Hardin–Simmons University, University of Oklahoma
- Profession: Retired educator, counselor, and assistant principal

Ann Coody (born December 12, 1937) is an American politician from the U.S. state of Oklahoma. A member of the Republican Party, she was elected to the Oklahoma House of Representatives in 2004, and represented the 64th district until she was term limited in 2016. Before serving as Oklahoma state representative, Coody was a longtime educator, counselor, and assistant principal for Lawton Public Schools. To date, Coody is the primary author of 125 bills.

== Early life ==
Ann Coody was born in Shreveport, Louisiana and lived there until she was twelve years old. The family moved to San Antonio, Texas where her father was stationed at Randolph Air Force Base. Coody graduated from Alma Heights High School in San Antonio.

=== Education ===
Before departing for Hardin-Simmons University in Abilene, Texas, Coody met her future husband, Dale Coody, on a blind date. He followed Ann to Hardin-Simmons and the two dated throughout her freshman year. Ann's father was transferred to Tachikawa Air Force base in Japan and she was expected to join her family there. After spending a year abroad, Coody returned to Hardin-Simmons and finished her Bachelor of Arts degree in speech and drama and minor in English.

=== Married life and career ===
Soon after graduation, Dale and Ann married and spent their first year in Seagraves, Texas, while Dale served as the music and educational director at the First Baptist Church in Seagraves. The two moved around in Texas for a time before returning to Tulsa, Oklahoma in 1962. In 1963, after both of their children were born, Dale and Ann moved to Lawton, Oklahoma, where they have lived ever since. While teaching at Tomlinson high school, Coody received her Master's in guidance and counseling from the University of Oklahoma. Soon after, Coody was hired as the school counselor at MacArthur High School and remained there for 26 years. While in this position, Coody obtained her certificate in secondary education from the University of Oklahoma. After 9 years as the counselor, she was hired at MacArthur as the Assistant Principal. Eventually Coody was hired as the principal at MacArthur high school and served in that position for 9 years.

In 2000, Coody retired as principal after 39 years in education.

== House of Representatives ==
Coody originally ran for office in 2002 as a registered Democrat and lost. In 2004, Coody was elected to the Oklahoma House of Representatives, and was the first female as well as the first Republican to hold the seat in her district (64th). During her first session, Coody got 4 of the 8 bills she presented passed into law. To date, Coody has been the primary author of 125 legislative bills. Coody was term limited in 2016.

=== Committees ===
- Common Education, Chair
- Conference Committee on Common Education, Chair
- Appropriations & Budget
- A&B Education
- Conference Committee on Veterans & Military Affairs
- General Conference Committee on Appropriations & Budget
- Joint Committee on Appropriations & Budget
- Veterans & Military Affairs

== Community Involvement ==
Coody is also a member of various organizations, including:

- American Legislative Exchange Council
- Comanche County Retired Educators Association
- Oklahoma Retired Educators Association
- First Baptist Church of Grandfield, Oklahoma
