= Bill Lucky =

American football player (1931–2012)

No. 71, 61
- Position: Defensive tackle

Personal information
- Born: August 24, 1931; Heidenheimer, Texas, U.S.
- Died: January 9, 2012 (aged 80); Rosenberg, Texas, U.S.
- Listed height: 6 ft 3 in (1.91 m)
- Listed weight: 250 lb (113 kg)

Career information
- High school: Temple (TX)
- College: Baylor
- NFL draft: 1954: 5th round, 60th overall pick

Career history
- Green Bay Packers (1955); Toronto Argonauts (1956); Green Bay Packers (1957)*
- * Offseason or practice squad member only

Career NFL statistics
- Games played: 12
- Stats at Pro Football Reference

William Henry Lucky Jr. (August 24, 1931 – January 9, 2012) was an American professional football defensive tackle. He played professionally in the National Football League (NFL) for one season, 1955, with the Green Bay Packers. Lucky played college football for Baylor University before being drafted 60th overall by the Cleveland Browns in the fifth round of the 1954 NFL draft.
