= Jerry Coody =

American gridiron football player (1931–2020)

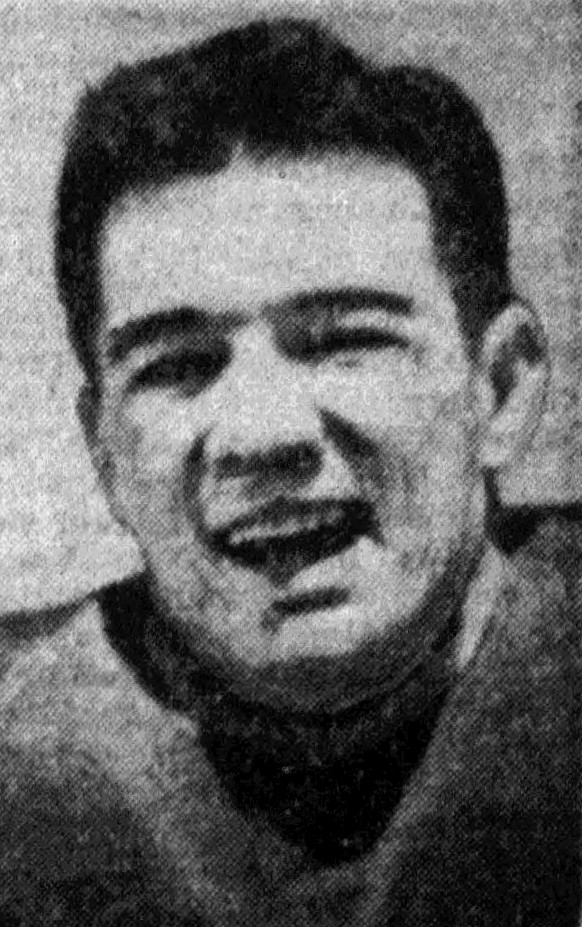
- Coody, circa 1951

Profile
- Position: Halfback

Personal information
- Born: October 3, 1931; U.S.
- Died: December 27, 2020 (aged 89); Waco, Texas, U.S.
- Listed height: 5 ft 11 in (1.80 m)
- Listed weight: 185 lb (84 kg)

Career information
- College: Baylor

Career history
- 1954: Calgary Stampeders

Awards and highlights
- 2× First-team All-SWC (1952, 1953)

Thomas Jarrell "Jerry" Coody (born October 3, 1931) was an American gridiron football player who played for the Calgary Stampeders. He played college football at Baylor University and is a member of the school's athletic hall of fame. Coody died on December 27, 2020.
