= Little River-Academy, Texas =

- City
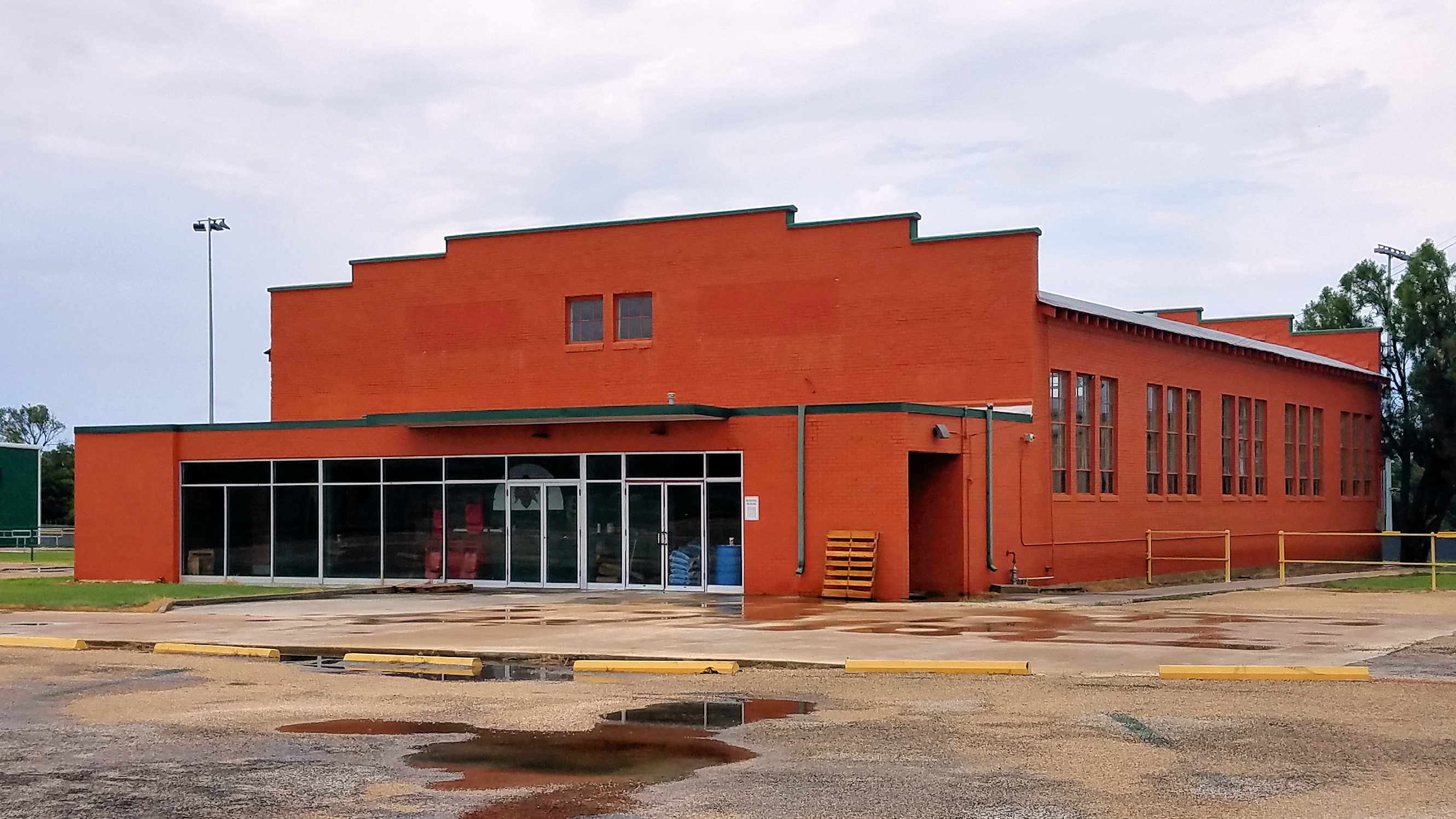
- 1934 gymnasium in Little River-Academy

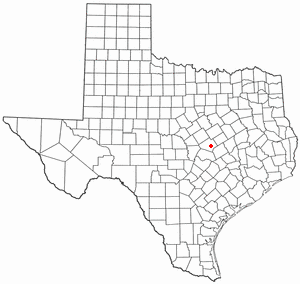
- Location of Little River-Academy, Texas

- Coordinates: 30°59′40″N 97°21′47″W
- Country: United States
- State: Texas
- County: Bell

Area
  - Total: 1.92 sq mi (4.96 km^{2})
  - Land: 1.91 sq mi (4.95 km^{2})
  - Water: 0.0077 sq mi (0.02 km^{2})
- Elevation: 492 ft (150 m)

Population (2020)
  - Total: 1,992
  - Density: 1,066.7/sq mi (411.84/km^{2})
- Time zone: UTC-6 (Central (CST))
  - Summer (DST): UTC-5 (CDT)
- ZIP code: 76554
- Area code: 254
- FIPS code: 48-43066
- GNIS feature ID: 1385349
- Website: https://littleriveracademy.us/

Little River-Academy is a city in Bell County, Texas, United States. The population was 1,992 at the 2020 census. It is part of the Killeen–Temple–Fort Hood Metropolitan Statistical Area.

== Geography ==
Little River-Academy is located southeast of the center of Bell County at 30°59′N 97°21′W (30.9851, –97.3551). The city consists of two once-distinct settlements: Little River, situated 2 miles (3 km) east of the confluence of the Leon River and Lampasas River to form the Little River, a tributary of the Brazos River; and Academy, centered 1.5 miles (2.4 km) east of Little River, at the intersection of Main Street and Texas State Highway 95. The intersection in Academy is 10 miles (16 km) south of the city of Temple.

According to the United States Census Bureau, Little River-Academy has a total area of 2.7 square miles (7.1 km^{2}), of which 0.004 square miles (0.01 km^{2}), or 0.20%, is water.

== Demographics ==
Historical population
Census	Pop.	Note	%±
1980	1,155		—
1990	1,390		20.3%
2000	1,645		18.3%
2010	1,961		19.2%
2020	1,992		1.6%
U.S. Decennial Census

=== 2020 census ===
As of the 2020 census, Little River-Academy had a population of 1,992 living in 680 households, including 503 families. The median age was 35.0 years, 29.3% of residents were under the age of 18, and 13.0% were 65 years of age or older. For every 100 females there were 93.6 males, and for every 100 females age 18 and over there were 92.9 males age 18 and over.

0.0% of residents lived in urban areas, while 100.0% lived in rural areas.

There were 680 households in Little River-Academy, of which 43.5% had children under the age of 18 living in them. Of all households, 55.7% were married-couple households, 13.4% were households with a male householder and no spouse or partner present, and 23.2% were households with a female householder and no spouse or partner present. About 17.2% of all households were made up of individuals and 6.1% had someone living alone who was 65 years of age or older.

There were 748 housing units, of which 9.1% were vacant. The homeowner vacancy rate was 2.6% and the rental vacancy rate was 10.0%.

Racial composition as of the 2020 census
Race	Number	Percent
White	1,580	79.3%
Black or African American	19	1.0%
American Indian and Alaska Native	17	0.9%
Asian	15	0.8%
Native Hawaiian and Other Pacific Islander	2	0.1%
Some other race	165	8.3%
Two or more races	194	9.7%
Hispanic or Latino (of any race)	435	21.8%

=== 2000 census ===
As of the 2000 census, there were 1,645 people, 584 households, and 439 families residing in the city.

The population density was 599.3 inhabitants per square mile (231.4/km^{2}). There were 618 housing units at an average density of 225.1 per square mile (86.9/km^{2}).

There were 584 households, out of which 43.5% had children under the age of 18 living with them, 58.9% were married couples living together, 11.6% had a female householder with no husband present, and 24.7% were non-families. 20.7% of all households were made up of individuals, and 10.6% had someone living alone who was 65 years of age or older. The average household size was 2.82 and the average family size was 3.29.

In the city, the population was spread out, with 32.2% under the age of 18, 7.8% from 18 to 24, 31.6% from 25 to 44, 17.9% from 45 to 64, and 10.5% who were 65 years of age or older. The median age was 33 years. For every 100 females, there were 95.6 males. For every 100 females age 18 and over, there were 88.8 males.

The median income for a household in the city was $39,063, and the median income for a family was $45,625. Males had a median income of $32,500 versus $21,081 for females. The per capita income for the city was $15,236. About 6.2% of families and 9.9% of the population were below the poverty line, including 12.5% of those under age 18 and 17.5% of those age 65 or over.

== History ==
There was a fort here, built in 1836, named Fort Griffin. Because of fights with Native Americans, early Texans settled near the fort. The railroad came to town in 1880, and the post office in 1886. By 1914, there were 250 inhabitants. The towns of Little River and Academy merged in 1989 to form Little River-Academy.

== Education ==
Little River-Academy is served by the Academy Independent School District.

AISD has four schools: Academy Early Childhood Center, Academy Elementary School, Academy Middle School, and Academy High School.

Academy is also home to Bell County Alternative School, which serves Holland, Salado, Bartlett, Troy, and Rogers.
