= El Campo Independent School District =

School district in Texas, United States

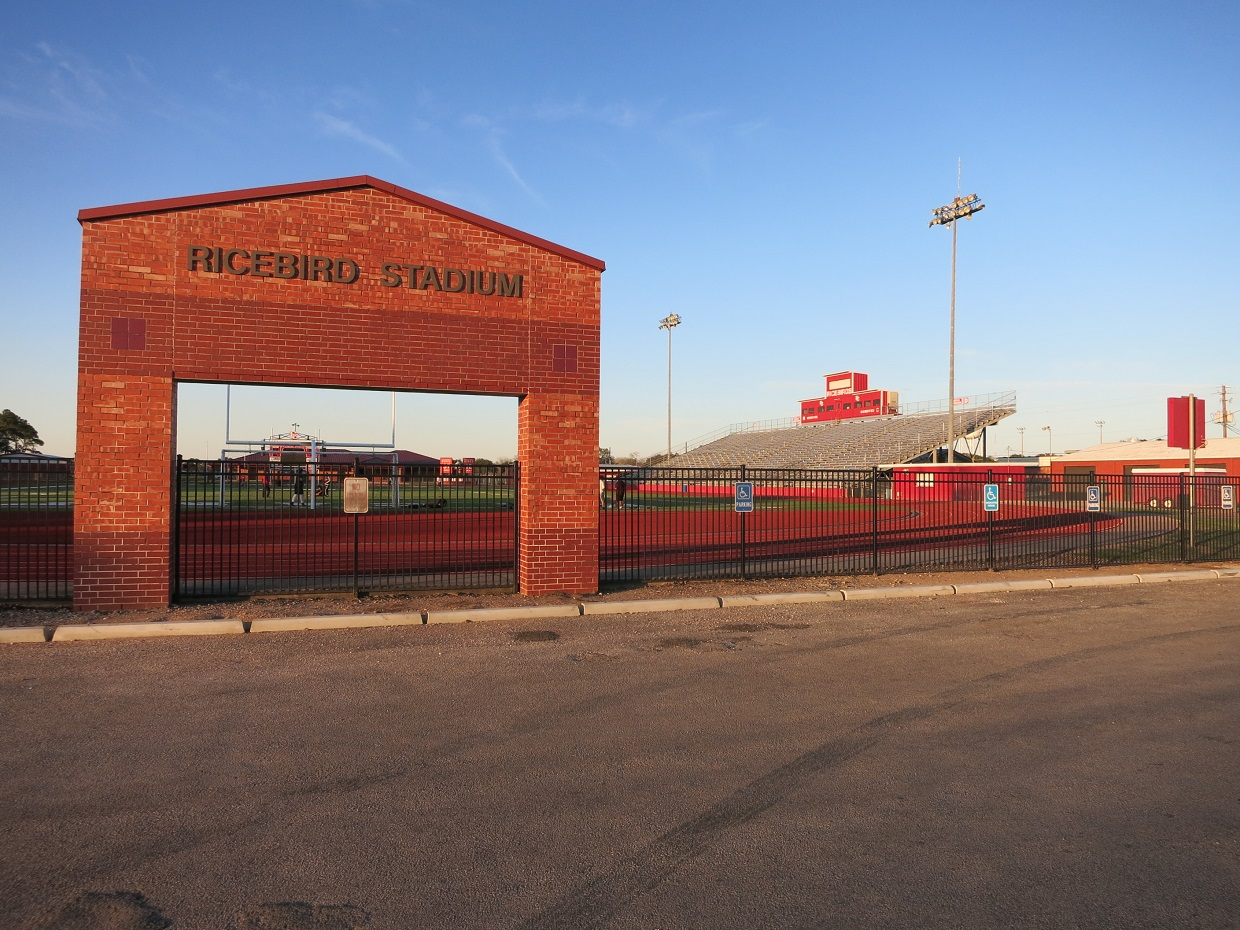
- Ricebird Stadium at the High School

Address
- 700 West Norris, El Campo, TX 77437 Wharton County; United States

District information
- Motto: Everyone Counts
- Grades: TAPR Accountability Rating: B (2019)
- Superintendent: Bob Callaghan
- Asst. superintendent(s): David Bright; Alicia Stary

Students and staff
- Students: 3,654 (2019)
- District mascot: Ricebird

Other information
- Website: www.ecisd.org

The El Campo Independent School District is a public school district based in El Campo, Texas, United States.

The district serves El Campo as well as rural areas in central and south central Wharton County.

In 2009, the school district was rated "academically acceptable" by the Texas Education Agency.

Mark Pool was the superintendent until sometime in 2015. In January of that year, the district began searching for a new superintendent. By April the only finalist for the position was Kelly Waters, the ECISD assistant superintendent of curriculum and instruction, and a member of the El Campo High School Class of 1984. The district's board of education voted 7-0 to hire her.

== Schools ==
- El Campo High School (Grades 9-12)
- El Campo Middle School (Grades 6-8)
- Northside Elementary School (Grades 4-5)
- Hutchins Elementary School (Grades 2-3)
- Myatt Elementary School (Grades PK-1)
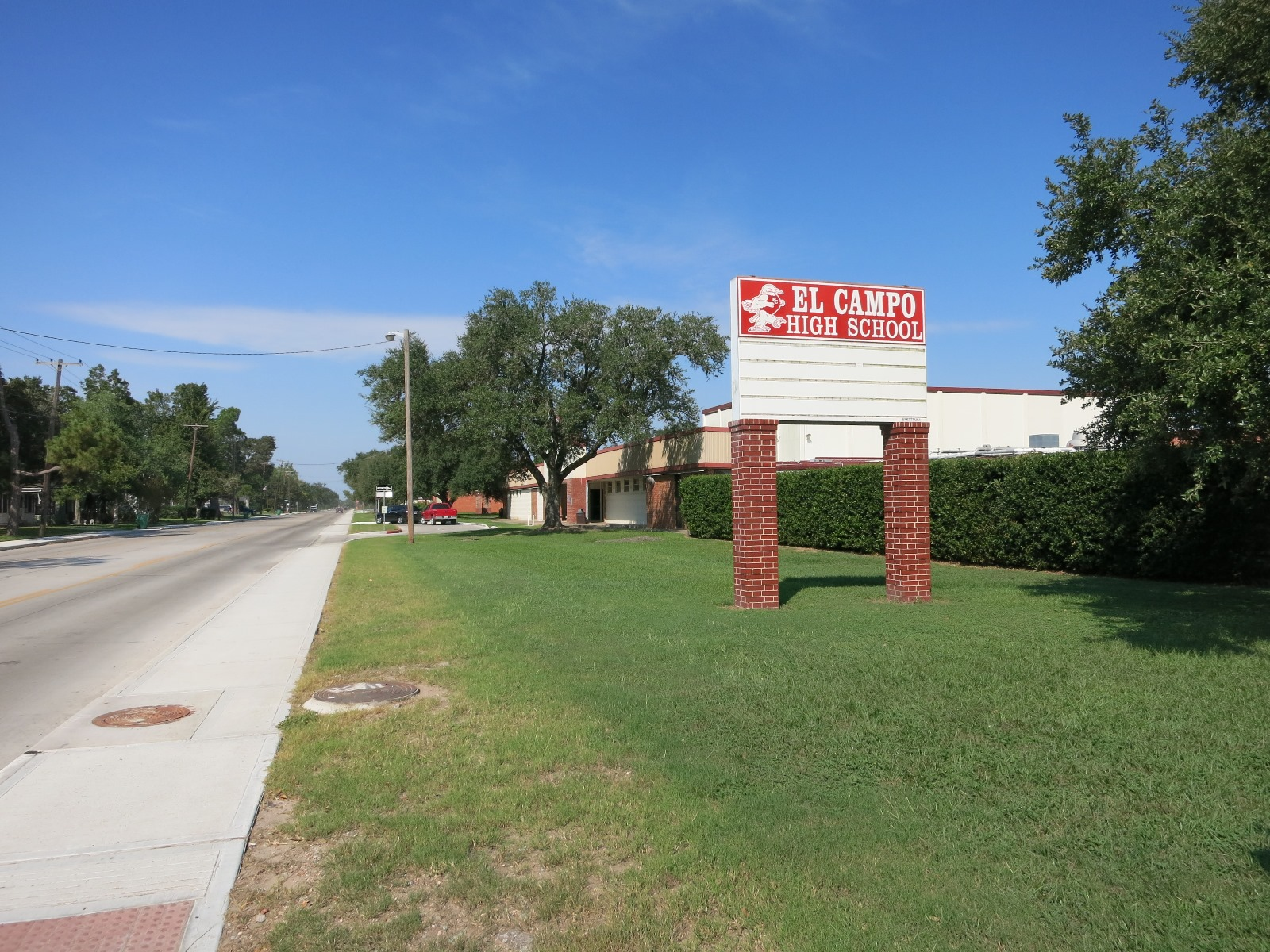
El Campo High School

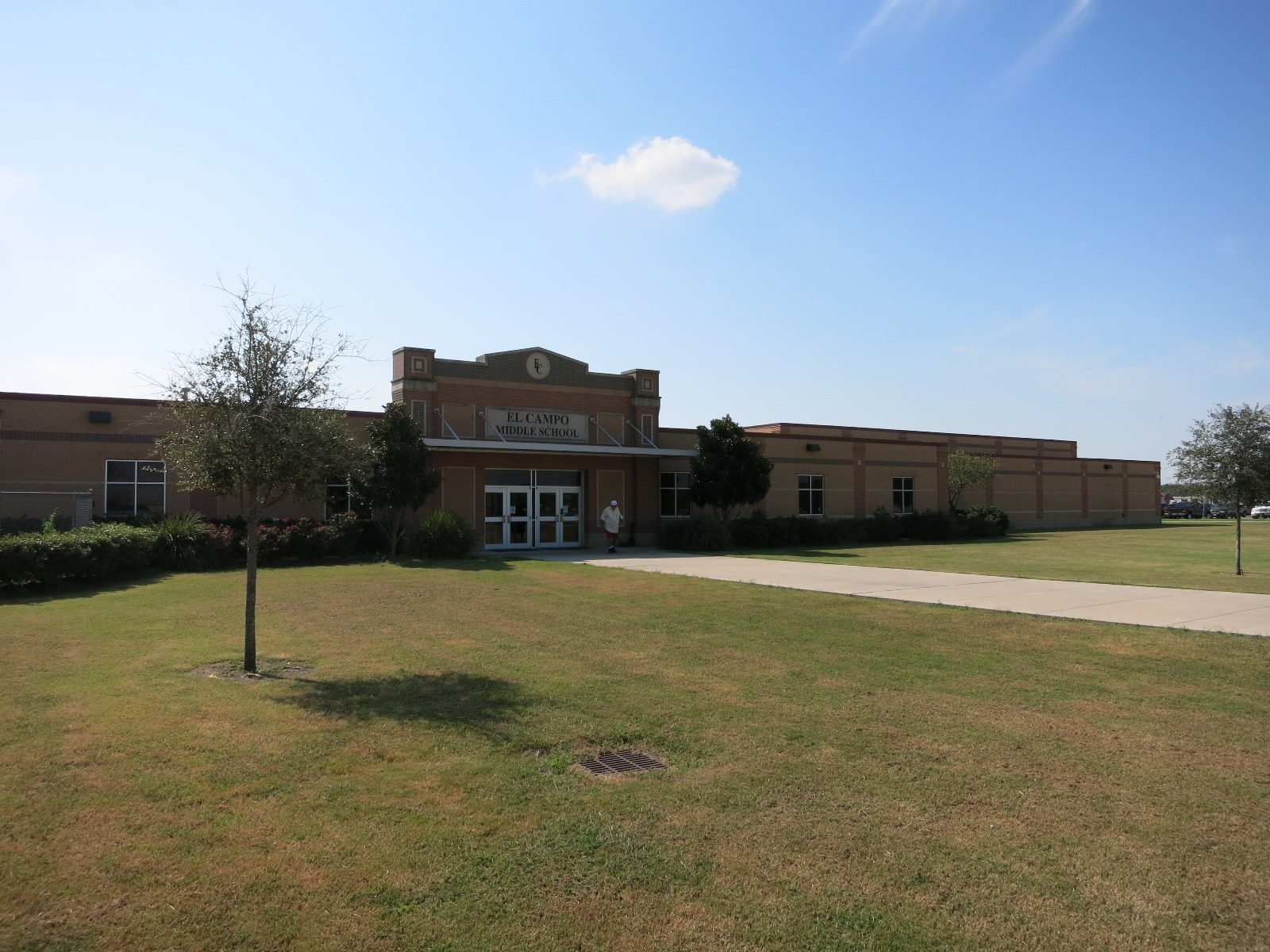
El Campo Middle School

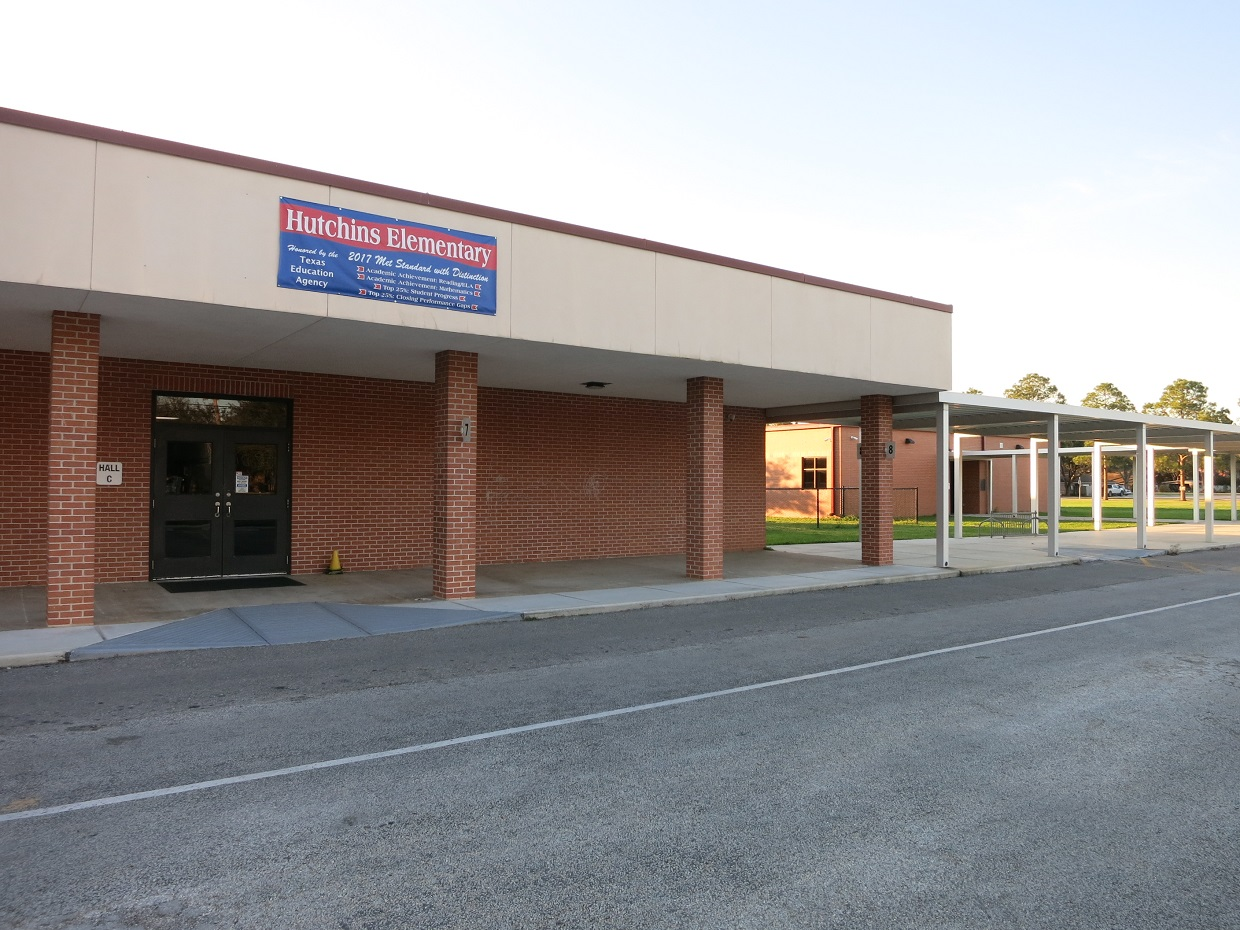
Hutchins Elementary School

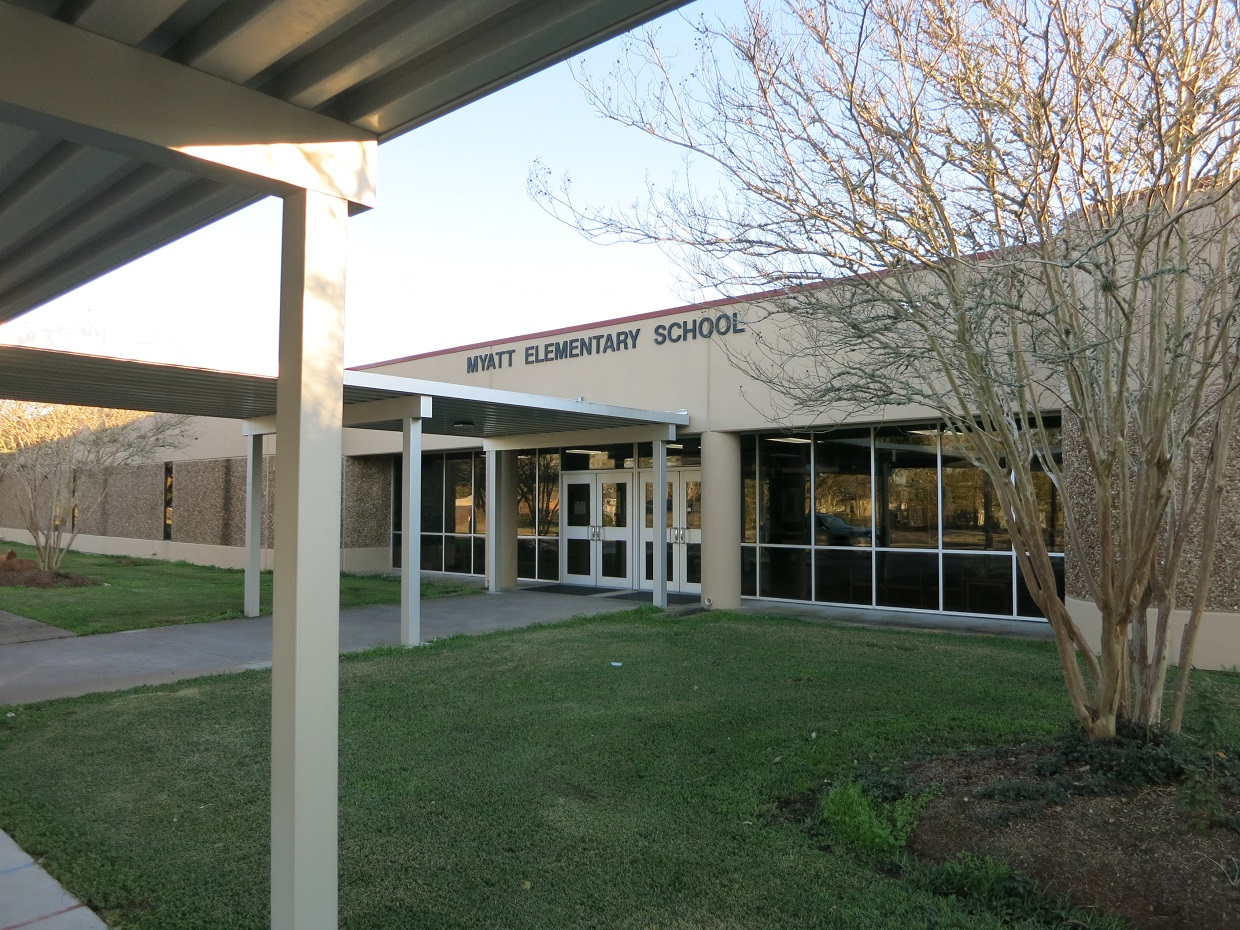
Myatt Elementary School

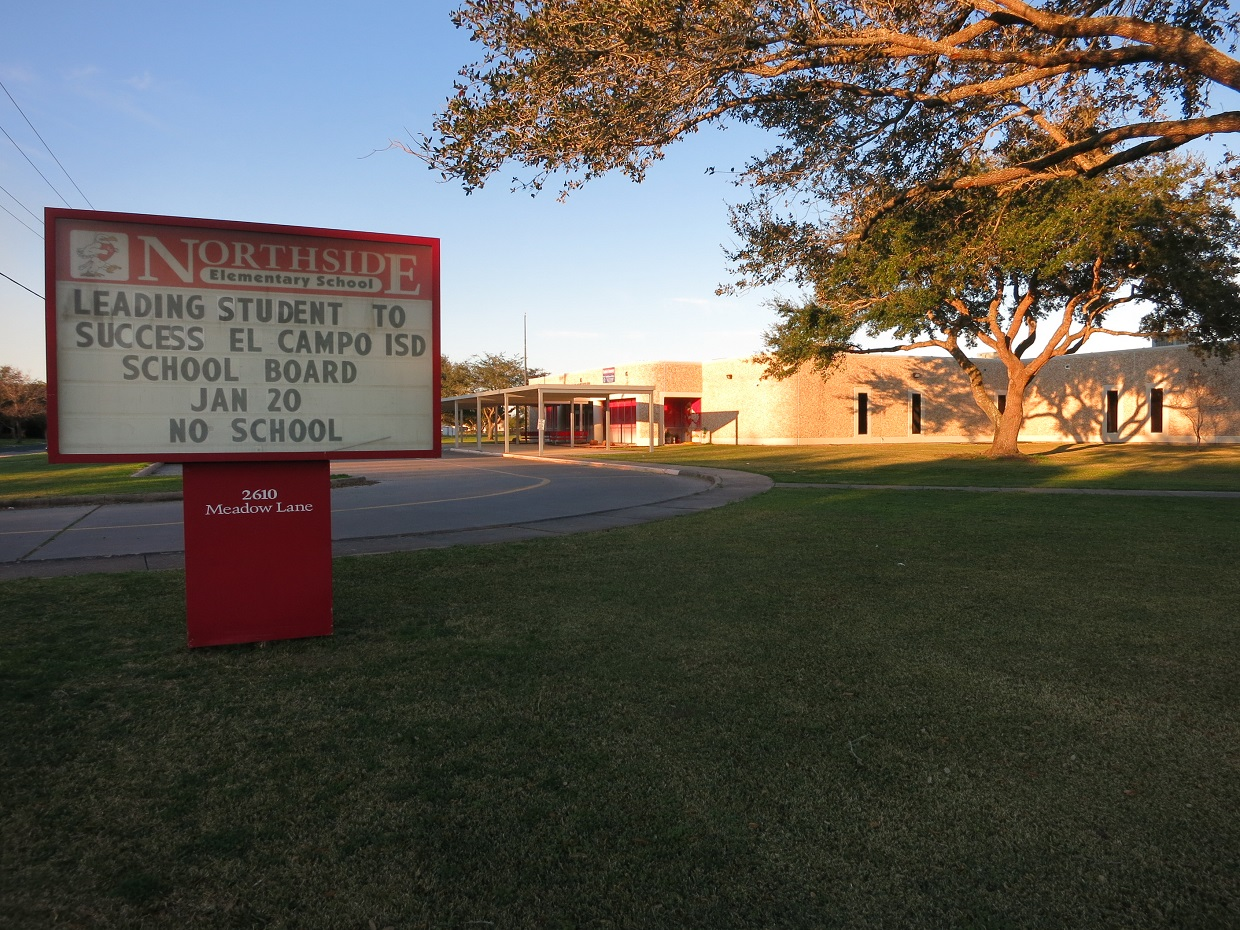
Northside Elementary School
