= El Campo, Texas =

- City
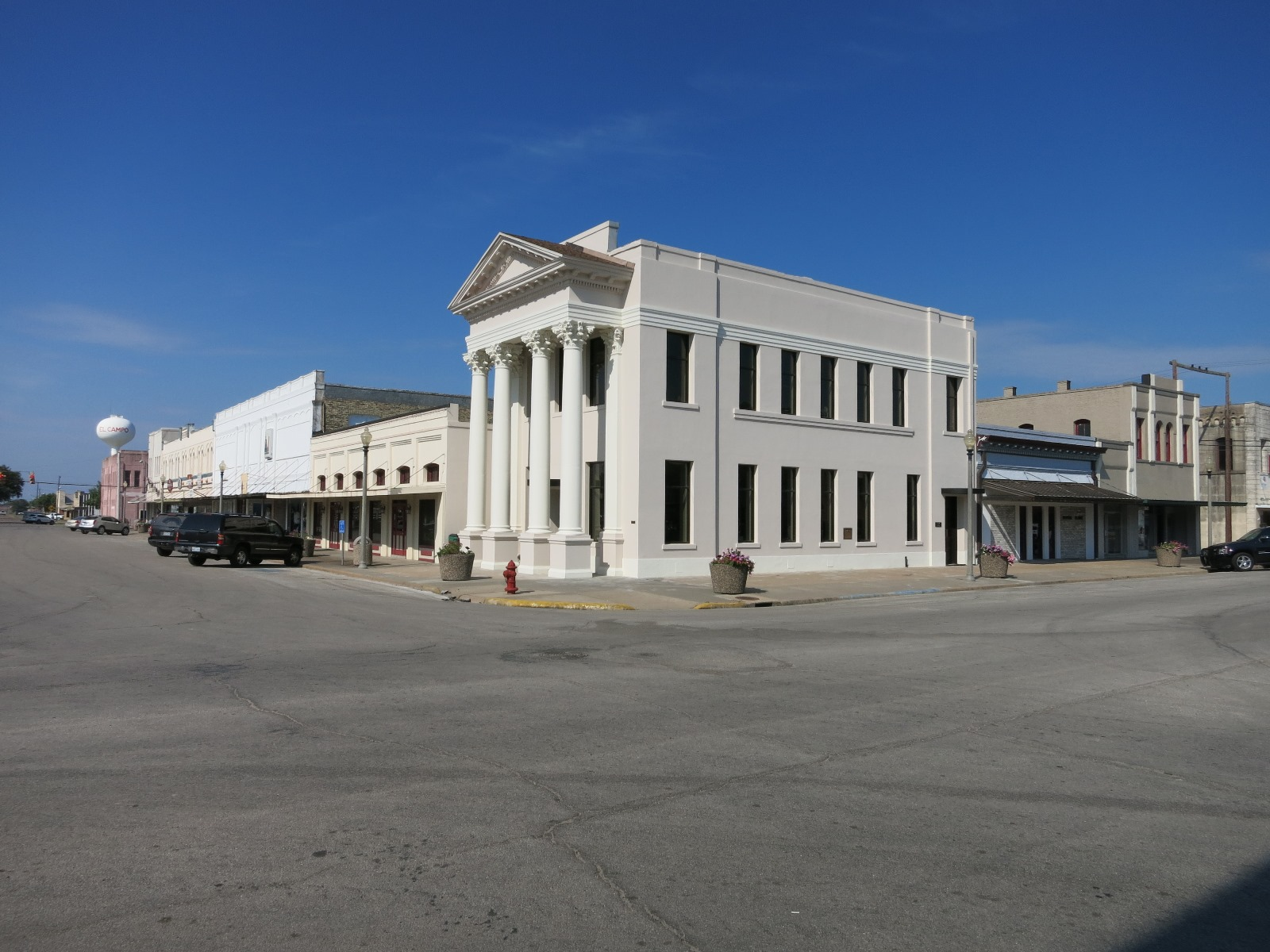
- Old business district along Monseratte Street

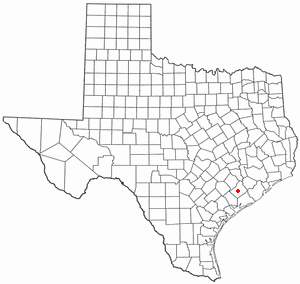
- Location of El Campo, Texas

- Coordinates: 29°11′48″N 96°16′24″W
- Country: United States
- State: Texas
- County: Wharton

Area
  - Total: 9.78 sq mi (25.33 km^{2})
  - Land: 9.76 sq mi (25.29 km^{2})
  - Water: 0.015 sq mi (0.04 km^{2})
- Elevation: 105 ft (32 m)

Population (2020)
  - Total: 12,350
  - Density: 1,181.9/sq mi (456.35/km^{2})
- Time zone: UTC-6 (Central (CST))
  - Summer (DST): UTC-5 (CDT)
- ZIP code: 77437
- Area code: 979
- FIPS code: 48-22864
- GNIS feature ID: 1356861
- Website: http://www.cityofelcampo.org/

El Campo is a city in Wharton County, Texas, United States. Its population was 12,350 at the 2020 Census, making it the largest city in Wharton County.

== Geography ==
According to the United States Census Bureau, the city has a total area of 7.5 square miles (19.3 km^{2}), all land.

== Demographics ==
Historical population
Census	Pop.	Note	%±
1910	1,778		—
1920	1,766		−0.7%
1930	2,034		15.2%
1940	3,906		92.0%
1950	6,237		59.7%
1960	7,700		23.5%
1970	9,332		21.2%
1980	10,462		12.1%
1990	10,511		0.5%
2000	10,945		4.1%
2010	11,602		6.0%
2020	12,350		6.4%
U.S. Decennial Census

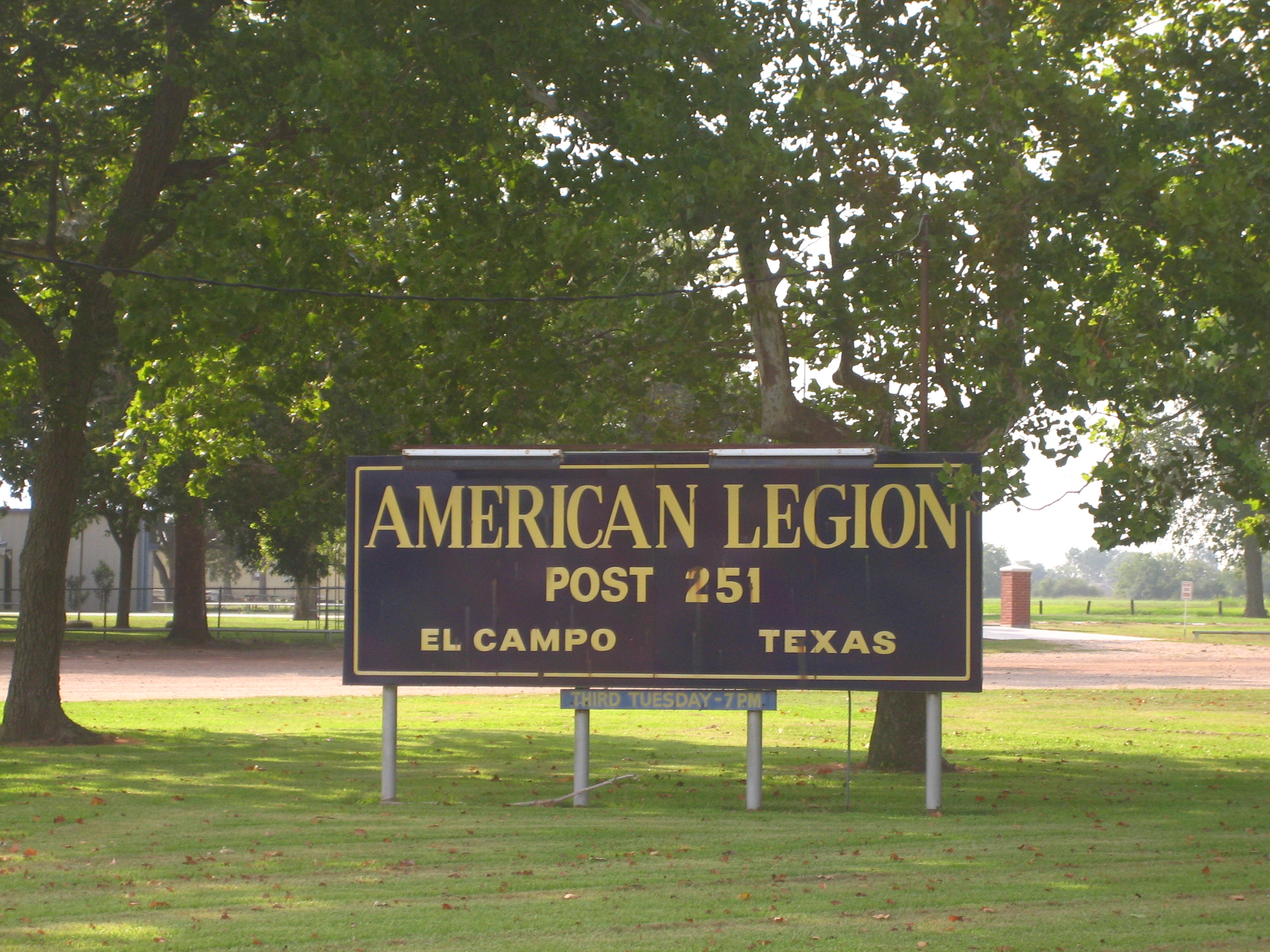
American Legion Hall in El Campo

=== 2020 census ===
As of the 2020 census, El Campo had a population of 12,350, 4,447 households, and 3,067 families residing in the city. Of the households, 37.4% had children under the age of 18 living in them, 46.1% were married-couple households, 17.5% were households with a male householder and no spouse or partner present, 29.8% were households with a female householder and no spouse or partner present, 25.6% were made up of individuals, and 12.8% had someone living alone who was 65 years of age or older. The median age was 35.2 years, with 28.0% of residents under the age of 18 and 16.1% aged 65 years or older. For every 100 females there were 93.9 males, and for every 100 females age 18 and over there were 91.6 males age 18 and over. There were 4,827 housing units, of which 7.9% were vacant; the homeowner vacancy rate was 1.8% and the rental vacancy rate was 5.5%. 99.2% of residents lived in urban areas, while 0.8% lived in rural areas.

Racial composition as of the 2020 census
Race	Number	Percent
White	6,451	52.2%
Black or African American	1,314	10.6%
American Indian and Alaska Native	104	0.8%
Asian	70	0.6%
Native Hawaiian and Other Pacific Islander	0	0.0%
Some other race	2,157	17.5%
Two or more races	2,254	18.3%
Hispanic or Latino (of any race)	6,521	52.8%

=== 2010 census ===
As of the census of 2010, 11,486 resided in the city, a change since 2010 of –1.0%

- Males: 48%
- Females: 52%
- Median resident age: 34.1 years
- Texas median age: 32.3 years

The population density was 1,400 people per square mile. The 4,491 housing units had an average density of 577.5 per square mile (223.0/km^{2}). The racial makeup of the city was 70.1% White, 10.9% African American, 0.3% Native American, 0.5% Asian, 16.6% from other races, and 1.7% from two or more races. Hispanics or Latinos of any race were 47.0% of the population.

Of the 3,916 households, 37.3% had children under 18 living with them, 53.1% were married couples living together, 13.5% had a female householder with no husband present, and 28.5% were not families. About 25.8% of households were one person and 14.4% were one person 65 or older. The average household size was 2.91 and the average family size was 3.31.

The age distribution was 29.3% under 18, 9.5% from 18 to 24, 26.2% from 25 to 44, 19.4% from 45 to 64, and 14.2% 65 or older. The median age was 34 years. For every 100 females, there were 92.0 males. For every 100 females 18 and over, there were 86.8 males.

The median household income was $40,698. Males had a median income of $27,416 versus $18,872 for females. The per capita income for the city was $14,464. About 16.5% of families and 23.6% of the population were below the poverty line.

== Education ==
Education in the city of El Campo is provided by the El Campo Independent School District and a number of private schools.

== Transportation ==
The Colorado Valley Transit Authority operates bus services within El Campo and to Wharton. El Campo is accessible by road by Texas State Highway 71 and U.S. Route 59.

== Notable people ==
- Raul (Roy) Benavidez, a Medal of Honor recipient, was raised in El Campo from the age of seven.
- Gene Cernan, an astronaut (and the last person to have been on the Moon) lived in El Campo.
- Jeff Barosh, Texas-based country music singer-songwriter and professionally known as Jeff Chance, was born and raised in El Campo. He died in El Campo in 2008 at the age of 53.
- Joey Hunt, a former NFL player for the Seattle Seahawks, graduated from El Campo High School.
- Memo Rodriguez, a MLS player for the Houston Dynamo, was born in Wharton and raised in El Campo.
- Charles Swindoll, a Dallas-based radio minister, was born in El Campo.
- Ken Weaver, a musician, was raised in El Campo.

== Climate ==
The climate in this area is characterized by hot, humid summers and generally mild to cool winters. According to the Köppen climate classification, El Campo has a humid subtropical climate, Cfa on climate maps.
