= Cherokee (disambiguation) =

The Cherokee are Native American people. There are three, currently existing, federally-recognized Cherokee tribes:

- The Cherokee Nation, based in Tahlequah, Oklahoma
- The Eastern Band of Cherokee Indians, based in Cherokee, North Carolina
- The United Keetoowah Band of Cherokee Indians, also based in Tahlequah, Oklahoma

Cherokee can also refer to:

== Related to the Cherokee people ==
- Cherokee Nation (1794–1907), the historical government that preceded the current Cherokee Nation
- Cherokee language, spoken by the Cherokee peoples
- Cherokee syllabary, a writing system for the Cherokee language, invented by Sequoyah
  - Cherokee (Unicode block), a block of Cherokee characters in Unicode

== Places ==
=== Australia ===
- Cherokee, Victoria, a locality

=== Bahamas ===
- Cherokee Sound, a place

=== United States ===
- Cherokee, Alabama, a town
- Cherokee, California, an unincorporated community and census-designated place
- Cherokee, Nevada County, California, a former mining community
- Cherokee, Iowa, a city
- Cherokee, Kansas, a city
- Indian Hills-Cherokee Section, Kentucky, also known as Cherokee, a former city in Kentucky near Louisville
  - Cherokee Park, Louisville, Kentucky, a municipal park
- Cherokee, North Carolina, a census-designated place
- Cherokee, Ohio, an unincorporated community
- Cherokee, Oklahoma, a city
  - Cherokee Turnpike, a toll road in eastern Oklahoma
- Cherokee, Tennessee, an unincorporated community
- Cherokee Lake, Tennessee, a reservoir
- Cherokee, Texas, an unincorporated community
- Cherokee, West Virginia, an unincorporated community
- Cherokee, Wisconsin, an unincorporated community
- Cherokee Branch, Georgia, a stream
- Cherokee Run (Ohio), a stream
- Cherokee County (disambiguation)
- Cherokee Township (disambiguation)

== Businesses ==
- Cherokee Inc., an American clothing company
- Harrah's Cherokee, a casino and hotel in Cherokee, North Carolina
- Cherokee Casino Roland, a casino complex located in Roland, Oklahoma
- Cherokee Productions, an independent film production company founded by actor James Garner

== Music ==
- The Cherokee, an opera by Stephen Storace (1794)
- Cherokee (band), a later name for the rock band The Robbs
- "Cherokee" (Ray Noble song), a 1938 jazz standard written by Ray Noble
- "Cherokee" (Europe song), a 1987 song by Swedish rock band Europe
- "Cherokee", a song by White Lion from their debut album Fight to Survive
- "Cherokee", a song by John Moreland from his 2015 album High on Tulsa Heat
- "Cherokee", a song by Cat Power from her album Sun
- Cherokee Studios, a recording facility in Hollywood, California

== Plants ==
- Cherokee (grape), another name for the grape Catawba
- Rosa laevigata, also known as the Cherokee Rose
- Cherokee purple, a variety of heirloom tomato

== People ==
- Cherokee Fisher (1844–1912), American baseball player
- Cherokee Parks (born 1972), American former basketball player
- Crawford Goldsby (1876–1896), a.k.a. Cherokee Bill, American Old West outlaw

== Schools ==
- Cherokee Baptist Female College, original name of Shorter University, Rome, Georgia
- Cherokee High School (disambiguation)
- Cherokee Middle School, Cherokee, Alabama
- Cherokee Immersion School, a Cherokee language immersion school in Park Hill, Oklahoma
- Cherokee Heights Middle School, in Madison Metropolitan School District

== Ships ==
- HMS Cherokee, several Royal Navy ships
- Cherokee-class brig-sloop, a class of British Royal Navy vessels in the early 19th century
- USS Cherokee, ships of the United States Navy
- Cherokee-class tugboat, a United States Navy class
- List of ships named Cherokee

== Sports ==
- Toledo Cherokee, a junior ice hockey team in the United States Premier Hockey League, based in Toledo, Ohio
- Dodge Cherokee, an Argentine racing car
- Torino Cherokee, an Argentine racing car

== Transportation ==
- Jeep Cherokee, sport utility vehicle models
- Piper Cherokee, a family of light aircraft
- Hall Cherokee, a homebuilt glider
- Cherokee Railroad, a 19th century railroad in Georgia, United States
- "Cherokee", a named night train of the Rock Island Rail Road, between Chicago and Tucumcari, New Mexico

== Other uses ==
- Cherokee (rocket), a 1950s American experimental rocket used in testing of ejection seats
- Cherokee (nuclear test), a 1956 test using the first air drop of a thermonuclear weapon
- Cherokee (web server), an open-source cross-platform web server
- Cherokee Building, a historic building in Hollywood, California
- Cherokee Generating Station, a natural gas-fired power plant in Adams County, Colorado
- Cherokee Nuclear Power Plant, an uncompleted project outside Gaffney, South Carolina

== See also ==
- Cherokee City, Arkansas, an unincorporated census-designated place
- Cherokee Village, Arkansas, a city
- Cherokee Village, Tennessee, an unincorporated community
- Camp Cherokee (disambiguation), all in the United States
- Cherokee National Forest, in Tennessee and North Carolina
- Cherokee National Jail, Tahlequah, Oklahoma, on the National Register of Historic Places
- Cherokee Plantation (disambiguation), two plantations on the National Register of Historic Places
- Cherokee Ranch, Douglas County, Colorado, a cattle ranch on the National Register of Historic Places
- Cherokee Falls, Dade County, Georgia, a waterfall
- Cherokee Group, a geologic group in Missouri and Iowa
- Cherokee Shale, a geologic formation in Kansas
- Cherokee Apartments, an apartment complex in New York City
- 1st Cherokee Mounted Rifles, a Confederates States Army unit during the American Civil War
- Cherokee darter, a species of freshwater fish
