= Skeeterville, Texas =

- Unincorporated community
- Location within Texas Location within the United States
- Coordinates: 31°21′15″N 98°57′46″W
- Country: United States
- State: Texas
- County: San Saba
- Elevation: 1,348 ft (411 m)
- Time zone: UTC-6 (Central (CST))
  - Summer (DST): UTC-5 (CDT)
- Area code: 325
- GNIS feature ID: 1380551

Skeeterville is an unincorporated community in San Saba County, in the U.S. state of Texas. According to the Handbook of Texas, the community had a population of 10 in 2000.

== History ==
Established by the 1920s, the town is rumored to take its name from mosquitos which resident Roy “Dogie” Wilson noticed bothering his horse. In the years after World War II, Skeeterville had a church, and students attended school in Richland Springs and Locker.

The community had a population of 10 in 2000.

== Geography ==
Skeeterville is located on Old Bowser Road on the banks of Wilbarger Creek, 6 mi (9.7 km) north of Richland Springs in northwestern San Saba County.

== Education ==
Skeeterville did not have a school, so children went to school in either Richland Springs or Locker. Today, the community is served by the Richland Springs Independent School District.
