= Wayne Davenport =

American football player (1906–2001)

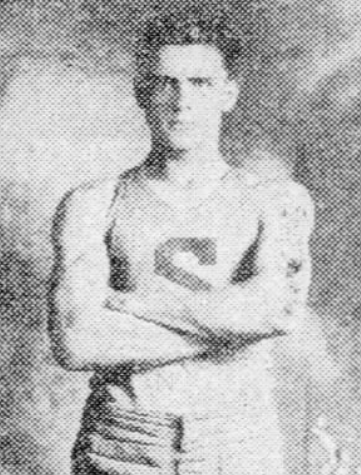
- Davenport, c. 1925

No. 16
- Position: Halfback

Personal information
- Born: December 16, 1906; San Saba, Texas, U.S.
- Died: April 27, 2001 (aged 94); San Angelo, Texas, U.S.
- Listed height: 6 ft 4 in (1.93 m)
- Listed weight: 187 lb (85 kg)

Career information
- High school: San Saba (TX)
- College: Hardin–Simmons (1926–1928, 1930); George Washington (1933)

Career history

Playing
- Green Bay Packers (1931); Washington Federals (1934)

Coaching
- Richland Springs High School (1929) Head coach; Lake View High School (1932) Head coach

Career statistics
- Games played: 2
- Stats at Pro Football Reference

Raymond Wayne Davenport (December 16, 1906 – April 27, 2001) was an American professional football player. A halfback, he played college football for the Hardin–Simmons Cowboys and later for one season in the National Football League (NFL) with the Green Bay Packers. He was a high school coach in between his time at Hardin–Simmons and for a year after his stint with the Packers before returning to college and playing a year for the George Washington Colonials in 1933. He later returned to his home state of Texas where he was a businessman.

== Early life ==
Davenport was born on December 16, 1906, in San Saba, Texas. He attended San Saba High School and is the school's only alumnus to make it to the NFL. At San Saba, he was a standout athlete, winning four varsity letters in football and basketball, three in baseball and track and field, and one in tennis. As a senior in 1924–25, he was voted the school's most outstanding athlete. Nicknamed "Mike", he was also "distinguished in extra-curricular activities" while at San Saba, and he graduated as part of the class of 1925.

The Waco News-Tribune reported that Davenport was set to attend either the University of Texas or Baylor University in 1925; however, he ended up enrolling at Hardin–Simmons University (then known as Simmons University) in 1926. He won a letter for the Hardin–Simmons football team in his first year in 1926 and was used as a fullback and halfback. In addition to football, he also competed in track and field and basketball. He received more letters in football in 1927 and 1928, although he was injured for part of the latter year.

After having been "one of the leading athletes" at Hardin–Simmons, Davenport graduated with a Bachelor of Arts degree in 1929 and then became a teacher at Richland Springs High School, where he coached athletics and football. He then returned to Hardin–Simmons in 1930 and was one of the conference's leading scorers, playing despite suffering an injury early in the season that initially left "his respiratory muscles partly paralyzed" and required a stay in the hospital. He was awarded a letter for the 1930 football season.

== Professional career and return to college ==
In June 1931, Davenport signed to play professional football with the Green Bay Packers of the National Football League (NFL). The Green Bay Press-Gazette described him as "a rugged back and he comes here highly recommended ... Davenport can play either [halfback] or fullback and he is credited with being an exceptional blocker." He became the first NFL player from Hardin–Simmons. He made the team and appeared in two games, one as a starter, but was released at the end of September, after the team trimmed their roster following the third game.

In 1932, Davenport became head coach at Lake View High School in San Angelo, Texas. The following year, he enrolled at George Washington University, where he studied law for two years and began playing for the George Washington Colonials football team at fullback. The Washington Times Herald described him as "powerful and rangy ... [a] head-on runner [with] high knee action ... most aggressive [and a] good type of player to have around." He played one season for George Washington and then spent the 1934 season with an independent football team known as the Washington Federals; The Washington Daily News noted that the Federals "play like pros but they're just playing for the fun of it."

== Later life and death ==
In 1934, Davenport began working for the federal government in Washington, D.C., where he was an auditor until 1936. He later returned home to Texas, where he was a partner for the Davenport Barber & Beauty Supply store from 1938 until 1961. He served in World War II for the United States Navy, being ranked a chief petty officer on a submarine tender and serving in the South Pacific.

In 1964, Davenport entered politics, running for the city commission in San Angelo. He ran as an independent and was one of four candidates, placing second in the initial vote before advancing to the runoff, where he lost to real estate businessman Ray Dorrance by a margin of 967 votes.

Davenport was a freemason and a member of the Kiwanis club, being named the Kiwanian of the Year in 1973. He was a member of the First Baptist Church of San Angelo. Davenport was married to Rondyl Johnson. He died on April 27, 2001, in San Angelo, at the age of 94.
