= Browser =

Browse, browser, or browsing may refer to:

== Computing ==
- Browser service, a feature of Microsoft Windows to browse shared network resources
- Code browser, a program for navigating source code
- File browser or file manager, a program used to manage files and related objects
- Hardware browser, a program for displaying networked hardware devices
- Image browser or image viewer, a program that can display stored graphical images
- Web browser, a program used to access the World Wide Web

== Other uses ==
- Browse Island, Australia
- Browse LNG, Australian liquefied natural gas plant project
- Browser (cat), a Texan library cat
- Browsing, a kind of orienting strategy in animals and human beings
- Browsing (herbivory), a type of feeding behavior in herbivores

== See also ==
- Bowser (disambiguation)
