= Apex, Texas =

Ghost town in Texas, US

- Ghost town
- Location in Texas
- Coordinates: 30.96961470°N 98.92587890°W
- Country: United States
- State: Texas
- County: San Saba

Apex is a ghost town in San Saba County, Texas, United States. Situated at the head of Cold Creek, it was founded by judge Warren Potter for ranchers to trade at. It peaked in the 1880s, with a population of 20, and ballot box operated there, as well as a post office in 1880 and 1881, before being consolidated by nearby Algerita. It was later abandoned.
