= McMillan, Texas =

- Unincorporated community
- Location within Texas Location within the United States
- Coordinates: 31°19′11″N 98°39′07″W
- Country: United States
- State: Texas
- County: San Saba
- Elevation: 1,207 ft (368 m)
- Time zone: UTC-6 (Central (CST))
  - Summer (DST): UTC-5 (CDT)
- Area code: 325
- GNIS feature ID: 2034961

McMillan is an unincorporated community in San Saba County, in the U.S. state of Texas. According to the Handbook of Texas, the community had a population of 15 in 2000.

== History ==
McMillan was named for Texas Ranger Captain Newton D. McMillin in the late 1850s. E.B. House petitioned for a post office to be established here on October 6, 1904, but it opened in Bomar. G.B. Meeks sold his store to local settler Hugh Miller that same year. Only a cemetery remained in 1979 and the community had a population of 15 as of 2000.

== Geography ==
McMillin is located a mile east of Texas State Highway 16 near the Colorado River, 9 mi (14 km) northeast of San Saba in northeastern San Saba County.

== Education ==
Flat Rock School was built in McMillan in 1882. Another one was built on Hugh Miller's property in 1899. Still another was built circa 1923 and joined the San Saba Independent School District in 1933.
