= Reuben E. Senterfitt =

Texas jurist and legislator

Reuben E. Senterfitt was a Texas jurist and former legislator. He served as the Speaker of the Texas House of Representatives from 1951 to 1955.

== Biography ==
Senterfitt was born in San Saba County, Texas on June 18, 1917 and graduated from San Saba High School in 1935. He went on to attend the University of Texas School of Law where he earned a law degree and was the editor of the Texas Law Review. He ran for Texas House of Representatives in 1940 and served as its Speaker from 1951 to 1955.

Senterfitt ran for Texas governor in 1956, losing to Price Daniel in the Democratic primary. He died on November 20, 2013 at the age of 96. He was married with seven children at the time of his death.
