= Hall, Texas =

- Unincorporated community
- Location within Texas Location within the United States
- Coordinates: 31°17′07″N 99°03′06″W
- Country: United States
- State: Texas
- County: San Saba
- Elevation: 1,486 ft (453 m)
- Time zone: UTC-6 (Central (CST))
  - Summer (DST): UTC-5 (CDT)
- Area code: 325
- GNIS feature ID: 1379878

Hall is an unincorporated community in San Saba County, in the U.S. state of Texas. According to the Handbook of Texas, the community had a population of 15 in 2000.

== Geography ==
Hall is located along Farm to Market Road 2997, 6 mi (9.7 km) west of Richland Springs in western San Saba County.

== Education ==
Hall had its first school built in 1905, which was destroyed by a fire in 1914. The school Richland Springs Independent School District in 1932.
