= Elm Grove, San Saba County, Texas =

- Unincorporated community
- Location within Texas Location within the United States
- Coordinates: 31°25′40″N 99°03′21″W
- Country: United States
- State: Texas
- County: San Saba
- Elevation: 1,463 ft (446 m)
- Time zone: UTC-6 (Central (CST))
  - Summer (DST): UTC-5 (CDT)
- Area code: 325
- GNIS feature ID: 1379717

Elm Grove is an unincorporated community in San Saba County, in the U.S. state of Texas. According to the Handbook of Texas, the community had a population of 15 in 2000.

== History ==
Elm Grove was purported to be founded sometime before 1900. The 1930 county highway map showed a church and several homes. The church remained in 1964 while only the community itself was identified in 2000. It had a population of 15 that year.

== Geography ==
Elm Grove is located off Farm to Market Road 765 and U.S. Highway 377, 26 mi (42 km) northwest of San Saba in northwestern San Saba County, near the McCulloch and Brown County lines.

== Education ==
Elm Grove had a school called Post Oak School in the 1930s, which remained in 1963. Today the community is served by the Richland Springs Independent School District.
