= Spring Creek, San Saba County, Texas =

- Unincorporated community
- Location within Texas Location within the United States
- Coordinates: 31°21′12″N 98°49′19″W
- Country: United States
- State: Texas
- County: San Saba
- Elevation: 1,391 ft (424 m)
- Time zone: UTC-6 (Central (CST))
  - Summer (DST): UTC-5 (CDT)
- Area code: 325
- GNIS feature ID: 1380584

Spring Creek is an unincorporated community in San Saba County, in the U.S. state of Texas. According to the Handbook of Texas, the community had a population of 20 in 2000.

== History ==
A post office named Bomar was established here in 1905 and remained in operation until 1914. It was operated in Mrs. W.H. Ledbetter's home and named after her parents, James and Lucinda. Spring Creek had a community center, a church, a cemetery, and one business as of 1984. Its population was 20 in 2000.

== Geography ==
Spring Creek is located on Farm to Market Road 500, 10 mi (16 km) northeast of Richland Springs in northern San Saba County.

== Education ==
The first school in Spring Creek opened in either the late 1870s or early 1880s. It was also served by the Cat Claw School in 1949 and joined the San Saba Independent School District.
