= Sloan, Texas =

- Unincorporated community
- Location within Texas Location within the United States
- Coordinates: 31°09′43″N 98°54′33″W
- Country: United States
- State: Texas
- County: San Saba
- Elevation: 1,312 ft (400 m)
- Time zone: UTC-6 (Central (CST))
  - Summer (DST): UTC-5 (CDT)
- Area code: 325
- GNIS feature ID: 2034972

Sloan is an unincorporated community in San Saba County, in the U.S. state of Texas. According to the Handbook of Texas, the community had a population of 30 in 2000.

== Geography ==
Sloan is located on the south bank of the San Saba River on Farm to Market Road 2732 and U.S. Route 190, 12 mi (19 km) west of San Saba in western San Saba County.

=== Climate ===
The climate in this area is characterized by hot, humid summers and generally mild to cool winters. According to the Köppen Climate Classification system, Sloan has a humid subtropical climate, abbreviated "Cfa" on climate maps.

== Education ==
Archibald J. Rose established a school here, which joined the San Saba Independent School District in 1955.
