= HomeOS =

- Developer: Microsoft Research
- Working state: Unknown (as of October 2013)
- Official website: www.microsoft.com/en-us/research/project/homeos-enabling-smarter-homes-for-everyone/

HomeOS was the working title of a home automation operating system being developed at Microsoft Research in the early 2010s. Microsoft Research announced the project in 2010 and abandoned it in 2012.

HomeOS communicated with Lab of Things, a cloud-based Internet of Things infrastructure also developed by Microsoft.

Microsoft's slogan for their HomeOS project was "Enabling smarter homes for everyone."

Microsoft's HomeOS development team has written three sample applications that make use of multiple devices, including a "sticky media" app that plays music in parts of the house that are lit up, but not other rooms; a two-factor authentication app that uses audio from smartphones and images from a front-door camera to turn on lights when a user is identified; and a home browser for viewing and controlling a user's access to all devices in a home.

Some staff who worked on the project cited Microsoft CEO Steve Ballmer's focus on enterprise applications, productivity software, and cloud computing as the reason for the stalled development.

== See also ==
- Building automation
- Home server
- Lighting control system
- LinuxMCE
