= Bowser (disambiguation) =

Bowser is the main antagonist in the Mario videogame and media franchise.

Bowser may also refer to:

== Liquid storage and delivery ==
- Bowser (tanker), a generic name for a tanker of various liquids
- Australian and South African English for a fuel dispenser at a filling station

== People ==
- Bowser (surname)
- Bowzer, the nickname of Jon Bauman (born 1947), singer for the music group Sha Na Na, game show host, and television personality

== Dogs and related characters in comics, literature and entertainment ==
- A traditional name for a pet dog, such as
  - Bowser, a former mascot dog of the Indiana Pacers basketball team – see Boomer
  - Bowser, the title character of Bowser the Hound, a 1920 children's book by Thornton Burgess
  - Bowser, Claire Bennett's pet dog in the American comic strip Moose & Molly
  - Bowser, a puppy character in Pound Puppies, a 1986–1989 American animated television series
  - Böwser vön Überdog, the bulldog primary antagonist in the American webcomic The Ongoing Adventures of Rocket Llama
  - Rex "Bowser" Pointer, a policeman character with a robot dog in COPS (animated TV series)

== Places ==
- Bowser, British Columbia, Canada, a community
- Bowser, Texas, United States, an unincorporated community
- Mount Bowser, Ross Dependency, Antarctica
- Bowser Valley, Victoria Land, Antarctica
- Bowser Formation, a geologic formation in Alaska

== Entertainment ==
- Bowser (Doctors), a fictional character from Doctors
- Bowser and Blue, a musical duo from Quebec, Canada who write and perform comedic songs
- Bowser Jr., Bowser's son and the secondary antagonist in the Mario franchise
- "Bowser", a song from Members Only, Vol. 3

== Other uses ==
- Bowser railway station, Victoria, Australia
- Bowser Manufacturing, a manufacturer of model railroad items

== See also ==
- Browser (disambiguation)
