= Locker, Texas =

- Unincorporated community
- Location within Texas Location within the United States
- Coordinates: 31°22′39″N 98°53′49″W
- Country: United States
- State: Texas
- County: San Saba
- Elevation: 1,303 ft (397 m)
- Time zone: UTC-6 (Central (CST))
  - Summer (DST): UTC-5 (CDT)
- Area code: 325
- GNIS feature ID: 1380094

Locker is an unincorporated community in San Saba County, in the U.S. state of Texas. The community had a population of 16 in 2000.

== Geography ==
Locker is located on Farm to Market Road 500, 17 mi (27 km) northwest of San Saba in northwestern San Saba County. Locker is situated at an elevation of approximately 1,303 ft (397 m).

== Education ==
Mesquite and Competition Schools joined the Locker School in 1911, giving it a reputation as a rural school community. It joined the Richland Springs Independent School District in the 1950s.
