= Chilean ship Ancud =

Ancud is the name of the following ships of the Chilean Navy, named for Ancud, Chile:

- Chilean schooner Ancud, launched in 1843
- Chilean brigantine Ancud, launched in 1853
- Chilean gunboat Ancud, ex-USS Cherokee launched in 1859, in Chilean service 1865–1878, sunk 1889
- Chilean tug Ancud, launched in 1910
