= Algerita, Texas =

- Unincorporated community
- Location within Texas Location within the United States
- Coordinates: 31°13′41″N 98°51′11″W
- Country: United States
- State: Texas
- County: San Saba
- Elevation: 1,306 ft (398 m)
- Time zone: UTC-6 (Central (CST))
  - Summer (DST): UTC-5 (CDT)
- Area code: 325
- GNIS feature ID: 1379331

Algerita is an unincorporated community in San Saba County, in the U.S. state of Texas.

== History ==
Algebrita was established in 1885 and named for the algerita shrubs in the area. After the construction of a railroad in 1907, Algerita residents moved their settlement to be nearer to it. In 2000, the settlement had a population of forty-eight.

== Geography ==
Algerita stands on U.S. Route 190, 7.5 mi (12.1 km) west of San Saba in central San Saba County.

== Education ==
Algerita had its own school in 1949. Today the community is served by the San Saba Independent School District.
