= Bowser, Texas =

- Unincorporated community
- Location within Texas Location within the United States
- Coordinates: 31°24′21″N 098°57′44″W
- Country: United States
- State: Texas
- County: San Saba
- Elevation: 1,312 ft (400 m)
- Time zone: UTC-6 (Central (CST))
  - Summer (DST): UTC-5 (CDT)
- Area code: 325
- GNIS feature ID: 1379449

Bowser is an unincorporated community in northwestern San Saba County in western Central Texas. According to the Handbook of Texas, the community had a population of 20 in 2000.

== History ==
The community was established in the 1870s near a bend on the Colorado River and named Bowser Bend. The community was based around the farm of Mr. Sim Witted and the local ford of Colorado was called Whitted Crossing. They had a Farmer Alliance store, a schoolhouse, a church, a post office, and even a cotton gin, but as buildings were frequently destroyed by flooding, starting in the late 1880s when the schoolhouse burned, new buildings were erected on higher ground about a mile and a half south of Bowser Bend, with the new elevation at 1312 ft. A new post office opened there in 1892 and operated until 1921, when the mail came out of the Mercury post office, some eight miles to the west.

Martin Gin opened in Bowser in 1891 and was there for approximately 50 years. Its population was 100 in 1896 and was supported by a cotton gin, a gristmill, and three churches. It lost three-quarters of its population in the early 1930s and had two businesses. The population rebounded to 50 in the late 1940s. The local church continued to operate in 1983. The population declined to 20 by 2000.

With the advent of well-paved roads, the population shrank. By the 1980s, Bowser was mostly a ghost town, with only two abandoned residences and the old schoolhouse still standing, but the Methodist church was still in use. The Church of Christ church, the Baptist church, and the Holiness tabernacle had all been torn down. However, beginning in the 1990s and following, people seeking rural locations moved into the area.

== Geography ==
Today, Bowser lies near the intersection of Farm Roads 45 and 765, approximately nine miles north of Richland Springs.

== Education ==
Bowser had a school in 1896. Today, the community is served by the Richland Springs Independent School District.
