= Harkeyville, Texas =

- Unincorporated community
- Location within Texas Location within the United States
- Coordinates: 31°12′39″N 98°47′08″W
- Country: United States
- State: Texas
- County: San Saba
- Elevation: 1,224 ft (373 m)
- Time zone: UTC-6 (Central (CST))
  - Summer (DST): UTC-5 (CDT)
- Area code: 325
- GNIS feature ID: 1379890

Harkeyville is an unincorporated community in San Saba County, in the U.S. state of Texas. According to the Handbook of Texas, the community had a population of 12 in 2000.

== History ==
An F1 tornado struck Harkeyville on January 20, 1973.

== Geography ==
Harkeyville is located north of U.S. Route 190, 2 mi (3.2 km) west of San Saba and 35 mi (56 km) northwest of Llano in central San Saba County.
