= USS Cherokee =

Four ships of the United States Navy have been named Cherokee, after the Cherokee Native American tribe.

- USS Cherokee (1859), was a blockade gunboat during the American Civil War.
- USS Cherokee (SP-1104), was a steam yacht built in 1903 and commissioned as a patrol ship in the Atlantic during World War I.
- USS Cherokee (SP-458), was built in 1891 but commissioned as a tug during World War I.
- USS Cherokee (AT-66), was a World War II era tug.
