= Chappel, Texas =

- Unincorporated community
- Location within Texas Location within the United States
- Coordinates: 31°03′21″N 98°34′15″W
- Country: United States
- State: Texas
- County: San Saba
- Elevation: 1,306 ft (398 m)
- Time zone: UTC-6 (Central (CST))
  - Summer (DST): UTC-5 (CDT)
- Area code: 325
- GNIS feature ID: 1379534

Chappel is an unincorporated community in San Saba County, in the U.S. state of Texas. According to the Handbook of Texas, the community had a population of 25 in 2015.

The climate in this area is characterized by hot, humid summers and generally mild to cool winters. According to the Köppen Climate Classification system, Chappel has a humid subtropical climate, abbreviated "Cfa" on climate maps.

== Education ==
Today the community is served by the San Saba Independent School District.
