= Melrose, California =

Melrose, California may refer to:

- Melrose District, Los Angeles, California
- Melrose, California, former name of Cherokee, Nevada County, California
- Melrose Hill, Los Angeles, California
- Melrose, Oakland, California
