= Cherokee County Schools =

Cherokee County Schools or Cherokee County School District may refer to:

- Cherokee County Schools (Alabama)
- Cherokee County Schools (North Carolina)
- Cherokee County School District (Georgia)
- Cherokee County School District (South Carolina)

== See also ==
- Cherokee Independent School District in Cherokee, Texas
- Cherokee Community School District in Iowa
- Cherokee USD 247 in Kansas
- Cherokee Public Schools in Oklahoma
