= J. D. Smith (offensive tackle) =

American football player (born 1936)

No. 76, 72
- Position: Offensive tackle

Personal information
- Born: May 27, 1936 (age 90); Richland Springs, Texas, U.S.
- Listed height: 6 ft 2 in (1.88 m)
- Listed weight: 250 lb (113 kg)

Career information
- High school: Richland Springs
- College: Rice
- NFL draft: 1959: 2nd round, 15th overall pick

Career history
- Philadelphia Eagles (1959–1963); Detroit Lions (1964–1966)

Awards and highlights
- NFL champion (1960); Pro Bowl (1961); First-team All-SWC (1958)

Career NFL statistics
- Games played: 86
- Games started: 83
- Fumble recoveries: 4
- Stats at Pro Football Reference

Jesse Daley Smith (born May 27, 1936) is an American former professional football player who was an offensive tackle in the National Football League (NFL) for the Philadelphia Eagles and Detroit Lions. He was the starting right tackle on the Eagles' 1960 NFL Championship team. He was named to the Pro Bowl in 1961. Smith played college football for Rice Owls and was selected in the second round of the 1959 NFL draft. He was an honorable mention All-American in 1958, and was selected first-team All-Southwest Conference that season.

== Early life ==
Smith was born on May 27, 1936, in Richland Springs, Texas. He is one of five siblings, three brothers and one sister. His father had a 600-acre farm near Richland Springs, and Smith worked on every aspect of the farm, from milking cows to riding horseback on cattle roundups. He attended Richland Springs High School, graduating in 1955. Smith excelled as a member of the football, basketball, and track and field teams.

Smith played defensive end, offensive end, halfback, and fullback on the football team, and center on the basketball team. Richland Springs' 1954 football team was undefeated and won the District championship. In his senior year, all three Richland Springs' teams were District champions. He was reported as 6 ft 5 in (1.96 m) in January of his senior year (1955).

In football, Smith was All-District 21-B at end in 1953 and 1954. Smith was All-State in basketball one season, and is said to have averaged 28 points per game in a season. As a senior, he led the basketball team with 23 points in the District 21-B championship game victory, 55–33, which matched his season's scoring average. As a senior in 1955, he led Richland Springs' track and field team to the District 21-B championship. In the championship track meet, Smith won the high hurdles, shot put, and discus individual championships, and tied for first in the high jump. He was also on Richland Springs' mile-relay winning team.

In April 1954, Smith suffered a rifle shot wound to the stomach or chest when a rifle he was handling inadvertently discharged; and he was in critical condition for a time, eventually spending 33 days in the hospital. He lost 40 to 50 pounds, and suffered damage to his lungs and liver. He recuperated over the summer, and was back to full strength playing football by the third game of the 1954 season.

== College career ==
Smith attended Rice University (then known as the William Marsh Rice Institute), and played football for the Rice Owls in the Southwest Conference. He had also been offered football scholarships to Texas A&M, Texas Tech and Hardin-Simmons, and basketball scholarships to Texas Christian University and Baylor University. As a sophomore at Rice, he became the team's starting right defensive tackle in 1956, even though he was new to the position. He was reported to be 6 ft 4 in (1.93 m) 215 lb (97.5 kg) as a sophomore. He was reported to be 6 ft 5 in (1.96 m) 230 lb (104.3 kg) or 235 lb (106.6 kg) as a senior.

In his junior (1957) and senior (1958) years, Smith was moved to right offensive tackle. Rice was the Southwest Conference champion in 1957, but lost to Navy in the Cotton Bowl, 20–7. Smith was an Associated Press (AP) honorable mention All-American at offensive tackle in 1958. The AP and United Press International (UPI) named him first-team All-Southwest Conference in 1958. He also made an All-America team selected by the NFL. He was known for his quiet stoic manner while playing at Rice, but teammate, College Football Hall of Fame member, and future NFL player Buddy Dial stated "But when he talks . . . you listen". Army All-American Bob Anderson said after the November 1958 game between Army and Rice that Smith "hit me harder than anybody I've ever played against".

Smith played in the Blue-Gray Game after his senior year.

== Professional career ==
The Philadelphia Eagles selected Smith in the second round of the 1959 NFL draft, 15th overall. This was the Eagles first pick in that year's draft. He received an offer to play in the Canadian Football League, but the sum offered was no greater than what the Eagles agreed to pay him, and he chose to play in Philadelphia. Although consistently reported to be 6 ft 4 in or 6 ft 5 in in high school and college by contemporaneous sources, and contemporaneously reported to be 6 ft 5 in 250 lb (113 kg) in 1963 and 1964 (his fifth and sixth years in the NFL), Smith has also been reported as 6 ft 2 in (1.88 m) as an NFL player.

He was the Eagles' rookie of the year in 1959, playing under the Eagles new offensive line coach, Nick Skorich. The Eagles were a tight knit team, and quarterback Norm Van Brocklin controlled the offense and its players as if he were coach of the offense. Smith started eight games at right offensive tackle, on an Eagles team that had a 7–5 record in 1959. In 1960, he started all 12 games on a 10–2 Eagles team that defeated the Green Bay Packers, 17–13, for the 1960 NFL Championship. In a late November game against the New York Giants, Smith recovered a fumble for a touchdown. In the championship game, he was captain of the kickoff return team's blocking wedge, which created space for Ted Dean's returning a kickoff 58 yards; a key factor in the Eagles' winning the game. In a vote of NFL players after the 1960 season carried out by the Newspaper Enterprise Association (NEA), Smith was named honorable mention All-Pro.

In 1961, Smith started all 14 games for the 10–4 Eagles. The Eagles played the Detroit Lions in the January 6, 1962 Playoff Bowl. Smith suffered a broken leg in that game. Smith was named to the Pro Bowl for the 1961 season, but could not play in the game after breaking his leg against the Lions. He started all 14 games for the Eagles in both 1962 and 1963. In April 1964, the Eagles traded Smith to the Detroit Lions for Floyd Peters and Ollie Matson. The Lions brought Smith in to replace 21-year old tackle Lucien Reeberg, who had died unexpectedly of uremic poisoning two months earlier.

The Lions' considered Smith a top offensive lineman in both run and pass blocking. In light of Smith's size 6 ft 5 in (1.96 m) 250 lb (113 kg) and speed at tackle, the Lions decided to introduce new running plays on offense that would use Smith as a pulling tackle. Smith started and played in only seven games in 1964. He suffered a calf muscle injury in the season's seventh game against the Baltimore Colts, and did not play the rest of the season. He also had gall bladder surgery in December 1964 before the season's final game. Smith missed the entire 1965 season because of a knee injury and the ensuing knee surgery. After not having played since October 1964, and after considering retirement, Smith returned to the Lions and started all 14 games at right tackle in 1966.

In one telling, Smith considered retiring after what turned out to be his final season with the Lions, but the Lions' wanted him to return the following season. While traveling to the Lions' training camp, Smith realized that he still wanted to retire and returned home without finishing the trip. Smith had undergone multiple surgeries and no longer felt he could go on playing. It was also reported that Smith had gotten as far as St. Louis on his way to training camp in mid-July 1967, and told Lions' general manager Russ Thomas he had to return to Texas to harvest his wheat crop; but Thomas still expected Smith to return to training camp as they had agreed to contract terms. Smith eventually joined the Lions' training camp in 1967, but decided to leave the team in late July 1967, retiring and ending his NFL career.

== Personal life ==
Smith was a school teacher in Richland Springs during some offseasons in his career, also working in the offseason in Richland Springs with heavy equipment at Spencer-Safford Loadcraft, Inc. He purchased a ranch near Richland Springs in 1962. After retiring from football, Smith, his wife Melanie, and their three children (Stephanie, Laura, and Ron), made their home in Richland Springs, with Melanie Smith becoming a teacher in Richland Springs High School. Smith originally worked in farming, ranching, and grain harvesting, and took on the challenge of harvesting grain on the King Ranch in South Texas for many years. He later formed a partnership involved in natural gas marketing, Santanna Natural Gas Company (later Santanna Energy). The business was originally in Oklahoma, but moved to Austin, Texas in 1988, not far from Smith's home. Smith and his wife had a very positive experience with the Philadelphia Eagles' team and the citizens of Philadelphia during his five years with the Eagles, and returned to visit the city after his time on the Eagles.
