= Bend, Texas =

- Unincorporated community
- Location within Texas Location within the United States
- Coordinates: 31°05′58″N 98°30′46″W
- Country: United States
- State: Texas
- County: San Saba, Lampasas
- Elevation: 1,106 ft (337 m)
- Time zone: UTC-6 (Central (CST))
  - Summer (DST): UTC-5 (CDT)
- Area code: 325
- GNIS feature ID: 2034958

Bend is an unincorporated community in Lampasas and San Saba Counties in western Central Texas. Its population was 1,678 as of the 2010 census.

== History ==
Settlement of the area began in the mid-19th century by farmers. In 1854, the community took the name Schleicher's Bend, after an early settler Gustav Schleicher. Other early settlers included the Low brothers. By 1856, it was called McAnelly's Bend after Robert Daugherty McAnelly, a landowner on the Lampasas side of the river. The community exists on both sides of the Colorado River, the Lampasas (west) side of the river is known locally as "Little Bend".

When the application for a post office on the San Saba side of the river was made in the late 1870s, the names Little Breeches and Bend were submitted; the Bend Post Office opened in 1879 and has continuously operated ever since. Bend had a population of around 400 in 1890. For most of the 20th century, however, the community recorded 100 to 125 residents.

Bend eventually developed during the 1870s and 1880s, with a gristmill, cotton gin, and general store serving farmers in the area. Three churches opened here in the 1880s. A justice of the peace courthouse, a constabulary, craft shops, mercantile stores, and a hotel were in operation in 1890. Corn, cotton, and cattle were the most common commodities shipped by area farmers. The community's population was 115 from 1990 through 2000, with two businesses.

Three miles south of Bend, the Victorian resort and spa of Sulphur Springs fell into disuse during the Great Depression, but was revived in the 1980s as a fishing resort on the Colorado River.

In the early 20th century, extensive pecan orchards were planted in the area. By the midcentury, the Hollis native pecan had become the region's cash crop. Bend boosters consider the 'Jumbo Hollis', a tree whose name is derived from its unusually large nuts and its first owner, Thomas I. Hollis, to be the world's most productive pecan tree. When other native pecan trees averaged 70 to 80 nuts per pound, Jumbo's averaged 33. At the 1904 World's Fair, 'Jumbo Hollis' pecans won the bronze medal for being the largest displayed. The tree's record year was 1919, producing 1,015 pounds of nuts.

== Geography ==
Bend is located on Farm to Market Road 580 on the western leg of a horseshoe-shaped bend in the Colorado River, 14 mi (23 km) southeast of San Saba in southeastern San Saba and western Lampasas Counties. It is also located 26 mi (42 km) west of Lampasas and 95 mi (153 km) northwest of Austin via U.S. Route 183.

== Education ==
The first school in this community opened in 1872. The Little Bend school closed in the 1920s and the Bend school was consolidated with San Saba schools in 1960. The San Saba County portion of Bend is served by the San Saba Independent School District, while the Lampasas Independent School District serves Little Bend, the Lampasas County portion of the community.

== Transportation ==
Farm to Market Road 580 crosses the Colorado River at Eagle Ford Crossing, connecting Bend with Little Bend. In 1884, a cable-line ferry was installed at Eagle Ford Crossing, and it was replaced by the Regency Bridge in 1902. The main road in Bend was paved in 1960.

== See also ==
- Colorado Bend State Park
- U.S. Route 190
- Texas State Highway 16
