= List of ships named Cherokee =

A number of ships have been named Cherokee, after the Native American tribe, including:

== United States Navy ==
- USS Cherokee (1859), a blockade gunboat during the American Civil War
- USS Cherokee (SP-1104), a steam yacht built in 1903 and commissioned as a patrol ship in the Atlantic during World War I
- USS Cherokee (SP-458), built in 1891 but commissioned as a tug during World War I
- USS Cherokee (AT-66), a World War II era tug, later with the US Coast Guard

== Royal Navy ==
- HMS Cherokee (1808) was the lead ship of the Cherokee-class brig-sloop. She saw service during the Napoleonic Wars. In 1810 she participated in an engagement that resulted in her crew qualifying for the Naval General Service Medal. The Navy sold Cherokee in 1828. She then became a merchantman trading between Liverpool and Africa. Cherokee was wrecked in August 1831 returning to England from Africa.
- HMS Cherokee (1842), a paddle patrol vessel in service on the Canadian Great Lakes
- HMS Cherokee (1856), an Albacore-class wooden screw gunboat

== Merchant ships ==
- Cherokee (1925 ship), was a 5,896 GRT passenger-cargo liner of the Atlantic, Gulf & West Indies Steamship Lines (AGWI), New York. A submarine torpedo sank her on 16 June 1942, with the loss of 86 lives, when she was north-east of Cape Cod while she was on a voyage from Halifax, Nova Scotia to Boston, Massachusetts.
