= Richland Springs High School (Texas) =

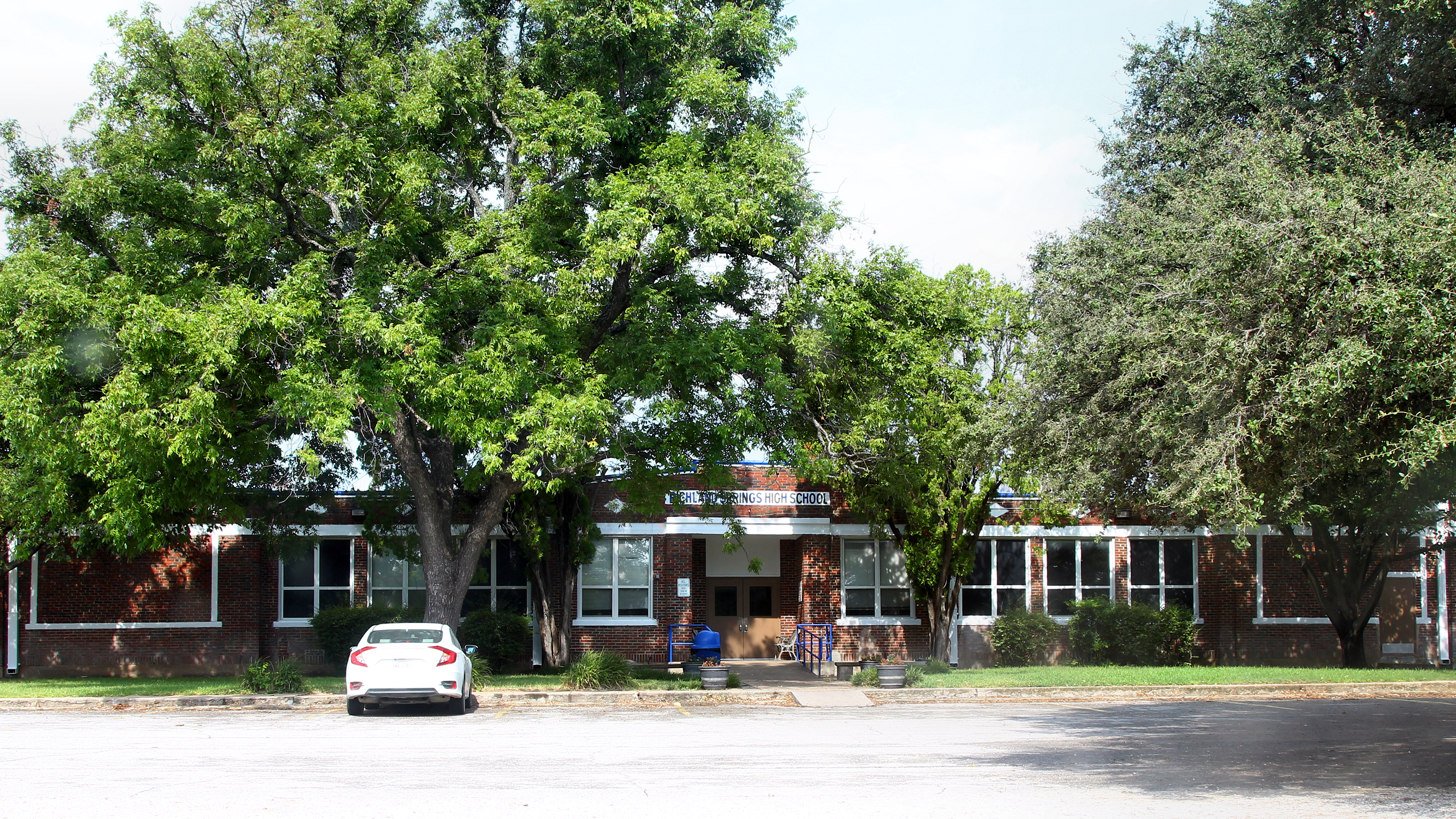

Location
- 700 West Coyote Trail; Richland Springs, Texas 76871-1005; United States; 31.270136°N 98.952256°W

Information
- School type: Public High School
- School district: Richland Springs Independent School District
- Principal: Don Fowler
- Staff: 15.44 (FTE)
- Grades: PK-12
- Enrollment: 140 (2023–2024)
- Student to teacher ratio: 9.07
- Colors: Blue & White
- Athletics conference: UIL Class 1A
- Mascot: Coyote
- Yearbook: The Coyote
- Website: Richland Springs High School

Richland Springs High School or Richland Springs School is a public high school located in Richland Springs, Texas (USA) and classified as a 1A school by the UIL. It is part of the Richland Springs Independent School District located in northwestern San Saba County. In 2015, the school was rated "Met Standard" by the Texas Education Agency.

== Athletics ==
The Richland Springs Coyotes compete in these sports -

- Basketball
- Cross Country
- 6-Man Football
- Golf
- Powerlifting
- Softball
- Track and Field
- Volleyball

Richland Spring's 6-Man Football Team has won nine State Titles, the most by any six-Man Football Team in the state of Texas.

=== State titles ===
- Football
  - 2004(6M), 2006(6M/D1), 2007(6M/D1), 2010(6M/D2), 2011(6M/D2), 2012 (6M/D2), 2015(6M/D2), 2016(6M/D2), 2019 (6M/D2)
- Boys Golf
  - 1967(B)

=== State Finalists ===
- Football
  - 2001(6M), 2020(6M/D2), 2025(6M/D2)

== Notable alumni ==
- J. D. Smith, former professional NFL offensive tackle for the Philadelphia Eagles

== See also ==
- List of high schools in Texas
