= Cherokee Plantation =

Cherokee Plantation may refer to:

- Cherokee Plantation (Fort Payne, Alabama), listed on the National Register of Historic Places in De Kalb County, Alabama
- Cherokee Plantation (Natchez, Louisiana), listed on the National Register of Historic Places in Natchitoches Parish, Louisiana
