= Cherokee High School =

Cherokee High School may refer to one of several high schools in the United States:

- Cherokee High School (Alabama), Cherokee, Alabama
- Cherokee High School (Georgia), Canton, Georgia
- Cherokee High School (New Jersey), Marlton, New Jersey
- Cherokee High School (North Carolina), Cherokee, North Carolina
- Cherokee High School (Oklahoma), Cherokee, Oklahoma
- Cherokee High School (Tennessee), Rogersville, Tennessee
- Cherokee High School (Texas), Cherokee, Texas
