= Cherokee Independent School District =

School district in Texas, US

Coordinates: 30.9792°N 98.7083°W

Cherokee Independent School District is a public school district based in the community of Cherokee, Texas, United States. The district is located in southern San Saba County.

Cherokee ISD has a single campus, Cherokee School, that serves students in grades Kindergarten through twelve.

== Academic achievement ==
In 2009, the school district was rated "academically acceptable" by the Texas Education Agency.
