= Cherokee, Texas =

Unincorporated community in Texas, United States

- Unincorporated community
- Location within Texas Location within the United States
- Coordinates: 30°58′57″N 98°42′27″W
- Country: United States
- State: Texas
- County: San Saba
- Elevation: 1,496 ft (456 m)
- Time zone: UTC-6 (Central (CST))
  - Summer (DST): UTC-5 (CDT)
- Area code: 325
- GNIS feature ID: 1354343

Cherokee is an unincorporated community in San Saba County, Texas, United States. According to the Handbook of Texas, the community had an estimated population of 175 in 2000.

== History ==
Cherokee had a population of 175 in 1990 and 2000. Farmers raised sheep, poultry, and pecans.

Today, the community has a post office (zip code: 76832), a general store, and a volunteer fire department. Ranching and hunting are the primary business activities in the area.

On June 12, 2009, two tornadoes struck Cherokee with minor damage.

== Geography ==
Cherokee is located at the junction of State Highway 16 and RM 501 in southern San Saba County, about 15 miles south of San Saba and 18 miles north of Llano.

== Climate ==
The climate in this area is characterized by hot, humid summers and generally mild to cool winters. According to the Köppen climate classification system, Cherokee has a humid subtropical climate, Cfa on climate maps.

== Notable people ==
- Kelcy Warren, politician, owns a ranch in Cherokee.
- Dan Kuykendall, U.S. Representative for Tennessee, was born in Cherokee.
- Ronnie Floyd, pastor of the local First Baptist Church (1976-1978).

== Education ==
Cherokee became a county center of higher education when Francis Marion Behrns established the Cherokee Academy in 1894. Two years later, the name was changed to West Texas Normal and Business College. A building that originally belonged to the college was purchased from Behrns on April 4, 1911, to house Cherokee Junior College. In 1921, it was sold to the county school district to serve as a high school.

Public education in the community of Cherokee is provided by the Cherokee Independent School District. The district has one campus, Cherokee School, that serves students in grades kindergarten through 12.

== Gallery ==
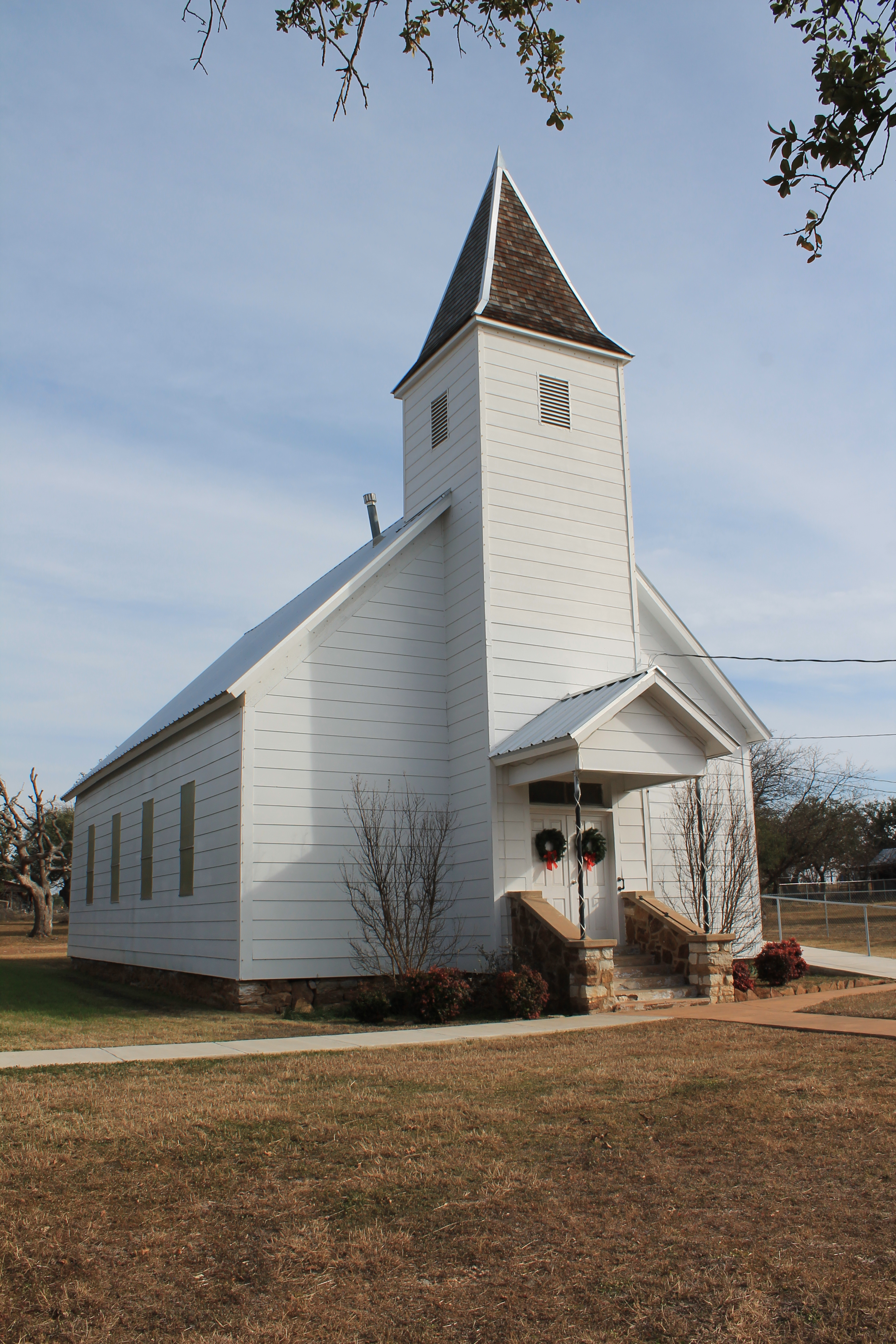
Church in Cherokee

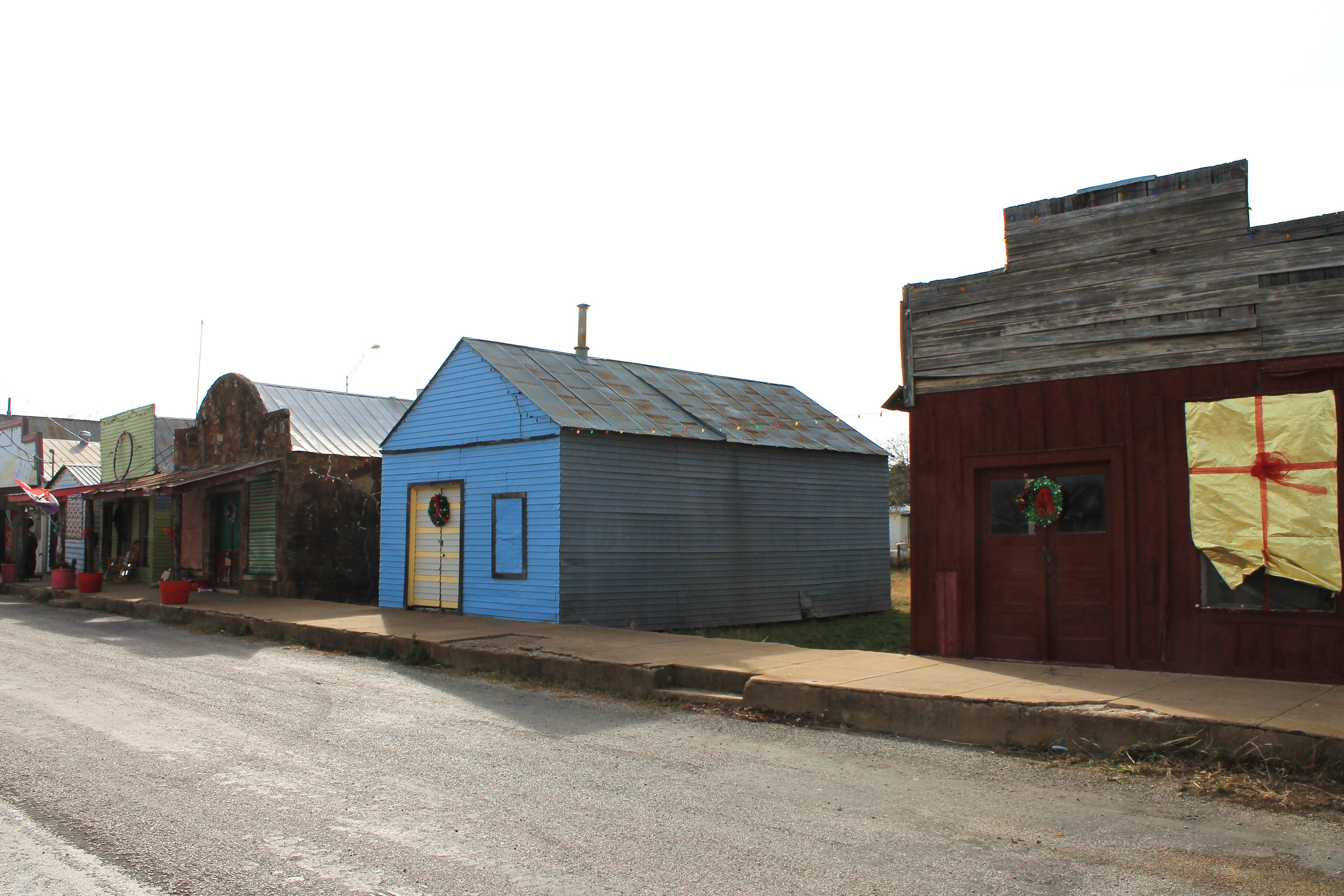
Buildings in Cherokee
