= Cherokee High School (Texas) =

Location
- 305 S Indian Ave; Cherokee, Texas 76832-0100; United States
- Coordinates: 30.97916°N 98.70716°W

Information
- School type: Public high school
- School district: Cherokee Independent School District
- Principal: Jennifer Bordner
- Staff: 18.66 (FTE)
- Grades: K-12
- Enrollment: 130 (2023–2024)
- Student to teacher ratio: 6.97
- Colors: Blue & White
- Athletics conference: UIL Class A
- Mascot: Indians
- Website: Cherokee High School

Cherokee High School or Cherokee School is a public school located in unincorporated Cherokee, Texas (USA), a small community in the west central portion of the state and classified as a 1A school by the UIL. The school is part of the Cherokee Independent School District which encompasses southern San Saba County. In 2015, the school was rated "Met Standard" by the Texas Education Agency.

== Athletics ==
The Cherokee Indians compete in these sports -

Cross Country, 6-Man Football, Basketball, Tennis, Golf & Track

=== State titles ===
- Football -
  - 1973(6M), 1975(6M), 1978(6M)

==== State finalist ====
- Football -
  - 1974(6M)
