= Cherokee Run (Ohio) =

Stream in Ohio, U.S.

Cherokee Run is a stream in the U.S. state of Ohio.

Cherokee Run was named for a Cherokee Indian who settled in the area.

== Location ==
- Mouth: Confluence with Cherokee Mans Run in Logan County 40°25′00″N 83°47′43″W
- Origin: Logan County 40°24′55″N 83°42′50″W

== See also ==
- List of rivers of Ohio
