= Cherokee Generating Station =

Natural gas–fired power plant in Colorado, U.S.

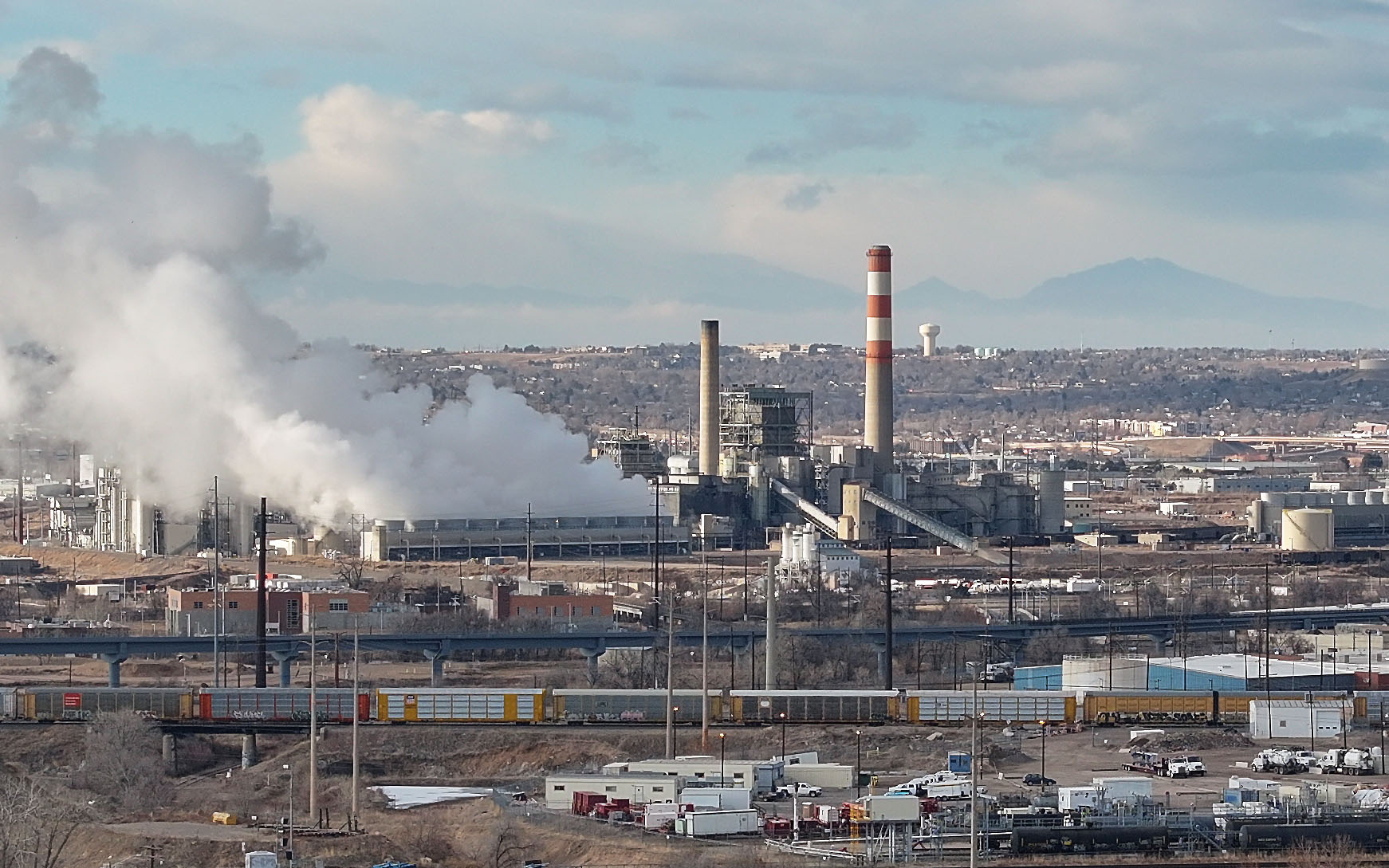
- Cherokee Generating Station in 2025
- Country: United States
- Location: North Washington, Colorado
- Coordinates: 39°48′27″N 104°57′54″W
- Status: Operational
- Commission date: 1957 (Unit 1); 1959 (Unit 2); 1960s (Units 3–4); 2015 (combined-cycle units)
- Owner: Xcel Energy
- Operator: Public Service Company of Colorado

Thermal power station
- Primary fuel: Natural gas
- Secondary fuel: Coal (historical)
- Turbine technology: Combined cycle and steam turbine

Power generation
- Units operational: 4
- Nameplate capacity: 1,006.4 MW (nameplate); 886 MW (net summer)
- Annual net output: 3,200 GW·h (2022)

Cherokee Generating Station is a natural gas-fired power plant in North Washington, Colorado, about 5 miles (8.0 kilometers) north of downtown Denver. Cherokee currently has a nameplate capacity of 1006.4 megawatts and a net summer capacity of 886 megawatts, making it the largest power plant in Adams County and the second-largest natural gas–fired plant in the state behind Fort St. Vrain Generating Station. In 2022, Cherokee produced a total of 3.2 billion kilowatt-hours of electricity, representing roughly 5 percent of total electricity generation in Colorado.

Cherokee is composed of four power generating units: one standalone natural gas–fired steam turbine, two natural gas–fired combustion turbines, and one steam turbine sourcing heat from the exhaust of the two combustion turbines. This configuration (excluding the standalone steam turbine) is known as a combined cycle natural gas power plant. In 2022, the overall thermal efficiency of the steam turbine unit was 31.3%, compared to 43.2% of the combined cycle units. Efforts have been made to reduce the amount of water consumed, most likely from evaporation in the cooling towers. The combined cycle units were constructed in 2015, adding another 625.6 megawatts of nameplate capacity to the steam turbine's 380.8 MW. Prior to 2017, the steam turbine unit was almost entirely powered by coal; it shifted to only natural gas that year and has not burned coal since. The change was partly driven by Colorado's Clean Air–Clean Jobs Act (HB 10-1365), along with factors such as low natural gas prices and state-level pressure to transition away from coal.
