= Cherokee Branch =

Stream in Georgia, United States

Coordinates: 34°54′22″N 85°04′49″W

Cherokee Branch is a stream in the U.S. state of Georgia. It is a tributary to Hurricane Creek.

Cherokee Branch was named after the Cherokee Indians.
