= Cherokee County =

Cherokee County is the name of eight counties in the United States:

- Cherokee County, Alabama
- Cherokee County, Georgia
- Cherokee County, Iowa
- Cherokee County, Kansas
- Cherokee County, North Carolina
- Cherokee County, Oklahoma
- Cherokee County, South Carolina
- Cherokee County, Texas
