= Code browser =

A code browser is an editor, sometimes with folding or other advanced layout capabilities, designed to structure source code or, by extension, other kinds of text file. Since it is typically aware of the syntax (and, to some extent, the semantics) of the text it is displaying, it is able to use various techniques to make navigation and cross-referencing faster and easier; this allows it to present a good overview of the code of large projects.

An editor of this type is positioned between a traditional text editor, a Smalltalk class browser and a web browser such as Mozilla. It displays a structured text file (marker-based folding) hierarchically, sometimes using multiple panes. A code browser usually supports syntax highlighting for major languages, and frequently allows users to define highlighting schemes for other files relevant to their activities; in some cases it may also integrate the output of other programs such as gdb.

Although code browsers were initially designed to edit programs, they can also be used for different tasks such as plain text outlining or helping to understand existing source code.
