= Camp Cherokee =

Camp Cherokee may be:

- Cherokee Council Explorer Base
- Cherokee Scout Reservation
- Camp Cherokee (Connecticut)
- Camp Cherokee (North Carolina)
- Camp Cherokee (Oklahoma)
- Camp Cherokee (Tennessee)
- Camp Cherokee (Texas)
