= Cherokee, West Virginia =

Unincorporated community in West Virginia, United States

Cherokee
- Unincorporated community
- Location within the state of West Virginia Cherokee (the United States)
- Coordinates: 37°24′25″N 81°20′12″W
- Country: United States
- State: West Virginia
- County: McDowell
- Elevation: 2,277 ft (694 m)
- Time zone: UTC-5 (Eastern (EST))
  - Summer (DST): UTC-4 (EDT)
- GNIS ID: 1554117

Cherokee is an unincorporated community in McDowell County, West Virginia, United States. It is possible that Cherokee is named after the Cherokee, a Native American tribe.
