= San Saba High School =

Location
- 808 West Wallace Avenue; San Saba, Texas 76877-3523; United States; 31.195410°N 98.727455°W

Information
- School type: Public high school
- School district: San Saba Independent School District
- Principal: Scott Snyder
- Teaching staff: 22.21 (FTE)
- Grades: 9-12
- Enrollment: 213 (2023–2024)
- Student to teacher ratio: 9.59
- Colors: Purple and gold
- Athletics conference: UIL Class AA
- Mascot: Armadillo/Lady Dillo
- Yearbook: Armadillo
- Website: San Saba High School

San Saba High School is a public high school located in the city of San Saba, Texas, United States; it is classified as a 2A school by the University Interscholastic League. It is part of the San Saba Independent School District, which encompasses central San Saba County. In 2015, the school was rated "met standard" by the Texas Education Agency.

== Athletics ==
The San Saba Armadillos compete in:

- Baseball
- Basketball
- Cross-country running
- Football
- Golf
- Powerlifting
- Softball
- Tennis
- Track and field

=== State titles ===
- Boys golf -
  - 1982(2A), 1983(2A)
