= Cherokee Plantation (Fort Payne, Alabama) =

Historic house that in Alabama, US

- U.S. National Register of Historic Places
- Alabama Register of Landmarks and Heritage
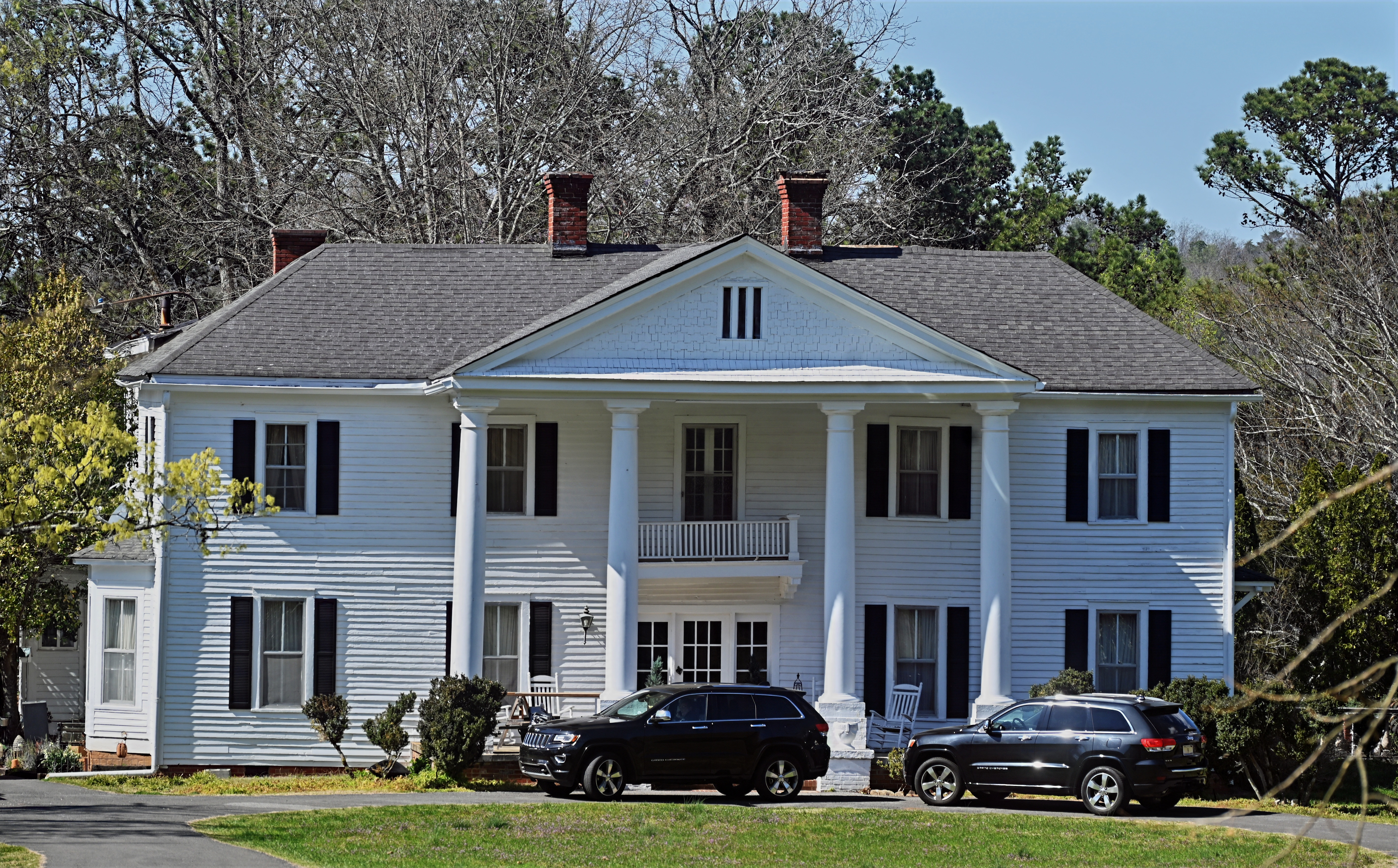
- The house in March 2025

- Location within Alabama Location within the United States
- Location: 100 Cherokee Dr. N. E., Fort Payne, Alabama
- Coordinates: 34°29′13″N 85°40′18″W
- Area: 16 acres (6.5 ha)
- Built: 1821
- Architectural style: Greek Revival
- NRHP reference No.: 84000384

Significant dates
- Added to NRHP: November 29, 1984
- Designated ARLH: July 16, 1976

Cherokee Plantation is a historic house in Fort Payne, Alabama, United States. The house was built in 1790 as a two-story log cabin by Andrew Ross, a judge on the Cherokee Supreme Court and brother of Principal Chief John Ross. In 1834 a second log cabin was built connected to the rear of the original cabin, and a third was built to the northeast, separated by a breezeway. Ross, being Principal Chief of the Cherokee nation, was forced to leave his home in 1838 under the provisions of the Treaty of New Echota, although he did not sign and disputed the legitimacy of the treaty. A portion of the Cherokee Trail of Tears passes in front of the house.

The house passed to William W. McFarlane, who enclosed and expanded it further in 1845, giving the house its present Greek Revival appearance. The Kershaw family made further modifications and renovations in the 1930s and 1960s. Current owners, the Brewer family, have continued the renovations. The house was listed on the Alabama Register of Landmarks and Heritage in 1976 and the National Register of Historic Places in 1984.
