= Hardware browser =

A hardware browser is a tool for displaying resources managed by a server or network hardware device, and allows users to interact with the hardware.

It is used to sense, detect, display and control hardware devices. These devices can be networked and upload information via the Internet to exchange information. Users can browse a variety of hardware devices, and configure the devices.

A hardware browser can display information about hardware managed by a server, network or hardware management system, and allows users to interact with the hardware. A hardware browser interacts with the server and gets information primarily over HTTP. The information is typically given by the server. Users access through a web browser (usually with HTML, PHP, etc.). A hardware browser interface may include multiple hardware devices; information for each device is retrieved from the server, network or information hardware. A hardware browser can be extended to support plug-ins, including software and associated hardware, such as ARDUINO, MICROARDUINO, STM32, MSP430, and Nuvoton MCU. Many hardware browsers support embedded images, video, audio and other streaming media. Hardware browsers include WRTnode.

== History ==
The first hardware browser was proposed by Yong Huang(China), who with WRTnode machinery group in 2014 co-invented the first hardware browser. Since then, the hardware browser develops with the Internet and Internet of Things together. At the same time, Maker Faire 2014 in Shenzhenthe show the lowest cost and power consuming computer vision automation solution, WRTnode gives uARM eyes and brain, using OpenCV ported on OpenWrt, recognizing the coins, and control uARM to pick them up with one yuan goes one side, and fifty cents goes another side.

=== Origin ===
The first hardware browser was invented by WRTnode machine group. Its goal is to optimize access to the computer and external hardware and was released in 2014. Yong Huang, Wei Luo, Jialei Hao, Ke Wang built it. It optimized the display, and made interactive information on hardware and network servers smoother.

== See also ==
- Device Manager
