= Cherokee, Nevada County, California =

Former gold mining community in California, United States

Cherokee
- Former settlement
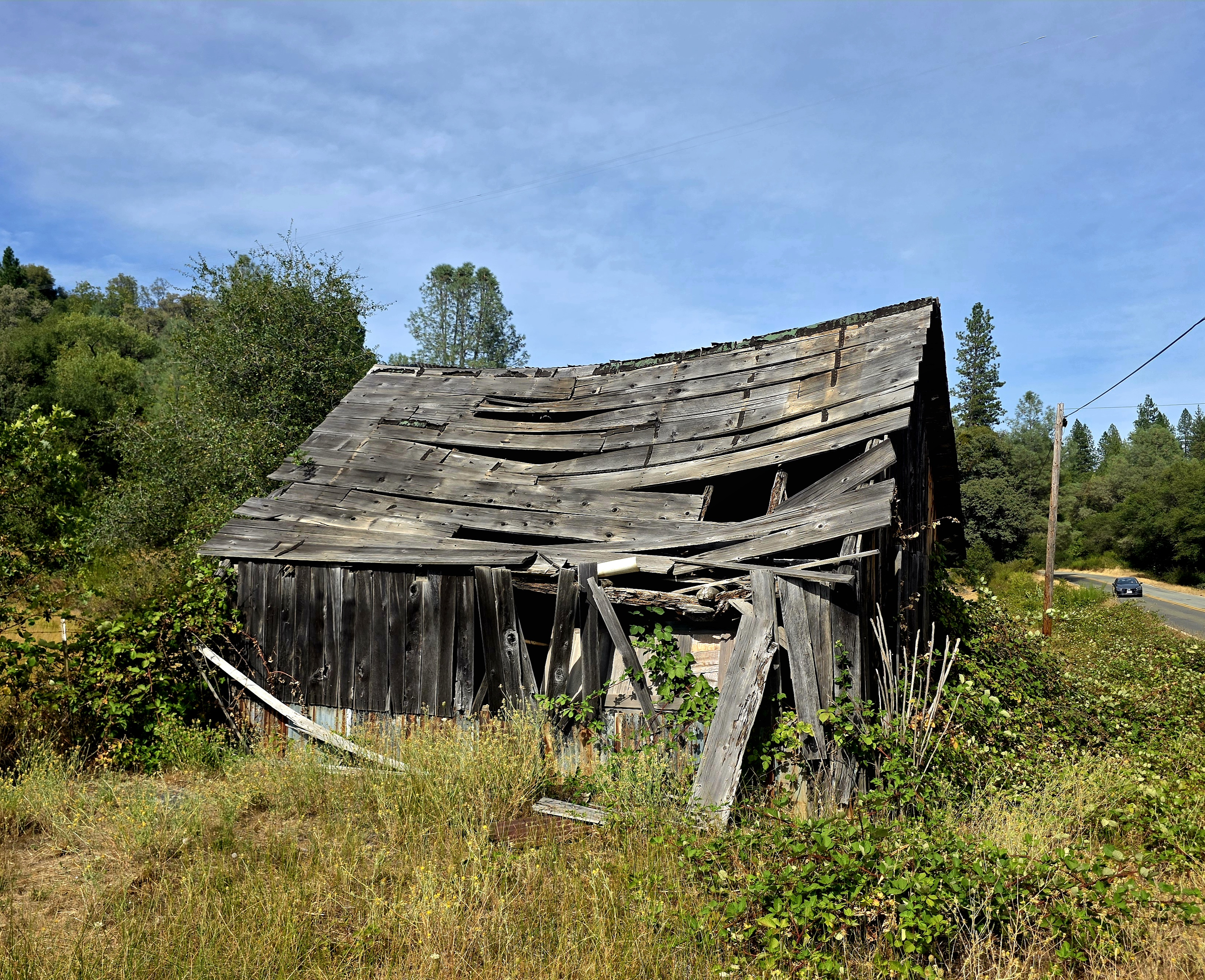
- Derelict building in Cherokee

- Location in California
- Coordinates: 39°22′13″N 121°02′35″W
- Country: United States
- State: California
- County: Nevada County
- Elevation: 2,516 ft (767 m)

Cherokee is a former gold mining community in Nevada County, California. The community has also been known as Patterson, Melrose, and Tyler. It is located on the San Juan Ridge about 4 miles east of North San Juan. Its elevation is 2,516 ft (767 m) above sea level.

== History ==
The San Juan Ridge is about 30 miles long and located between the South Yuba River and Middle Yuba River. It sits atop an ancient river bed of gold bearing gravel, which made it one of the richest California mining areas in the second half of the 19th century. Archaeologists have found signs of human habitation on the Ridge, including the area around Cherokee, dating back five thousand years. At the time of the Gold Rush, the Ridge was occupied by the Nisenan or Southern Maidu. who had lived in various locations along the Ridge for over a thousand years.

The Gold Rush came to Cherokee in 1850, when a group of Cherokee Indians begin mining there and gave it its name. In 1851, miners Crego and Utter built a home there. Mining in the area proved profitable, and the town grew quickly, especially after the Grizzly Ditch brought year round water for mining. By 1852, the population had reached 400, though only 2 families. For a while, Cherokee was the most active mining center on the Ridge.

The town's heyday was between 1856 and 1865. It had two hotels, the Grizzly and Curnow's, saloons, several stores, a butcher, a shoe shop, a resident physician and drugstore, and a blacksmith. Its sawmill had a capacity of 10,000 ft. of lumber a day. The local newspaper was the Cherokee Journal. There was stagecoach service to Nevada City. After 1878, Cherokee was connected to the world's first long-distance telephone line which ran from French Corral to the Bowman Lake area.

Following a visit in 1860, a reporter had this to say about Cherokee: “A few new buildings have made their entrance into town since our last visit, and a slight variation in favor of white lead and linseed oil is discernable [sic]. Gardens and orchards have sprung up as if by magic in the outskirts. The diggings still ply to some extent, though Cherokee is not a town of as much promise as regards mineral resources as formerly. Our old friends, Dr. Wyatt, Frank Wilder, Martin Frankenheimer and Turney, still remain the landmarks of the place. The Dr. runs a nice drug store and practices his profession as of yore. Turney keeps a hotel, Martin and Frankenheimer feed the hungry and clothe the naked, and Frank Wilder is sending acres of mud down Shady Creek, covering up ranches, destroying the navigation of the Sacramento, but putting pounds of filthy lucre in his pocket.”

A public school house was built by private subscription in 1855. 83 children attended in 1858, a number which increased to 107 in 1861. A new schoolhouse, with a small adjoining library, was built in 1872. By 1879, the number of students had dropped to 73. The town had a Catholic church, with a large congregation. Other denominations worshiped in the schoolhouse.

In 1854, 310 votes were cast in Cherokee. In the 1864 presidential election, McClellan edged Lincoln, 49 to 45. By 1879, the number of votes cast fell to 50.

A post office was established in 1855. Because there was already a California post office named Cherokee in Butte County, the name was changed by local vote to Patterson, in honor of local citizen James Patterson, the acting County Clerk. The post office was discontinued in 1895, reestablished in 1905 and closed in 1909. It reopened briefly in 1910, under the name Melrose, the Massachusetts hometown of postmaster James L. Morgan. In 1911, the name was changed to Tyler, the name currently on the highway directional sign at the intersection of Highway 49 and Tyler Foote Crossing Rd. In 1924, the post office was discontinued. Despite all the name changes dictated by the United States Post Office, the locals generally called the town Cherokee, and that name appears on many contemporary maps.

A town landmark was the Grizzly Hotel, built by the Turney family in 1852. The Grizzly Hotel was described by a local newspaper in 1854 as “one of the pleasantest homes for miners or travellers in the country. Mr. Welch, the present proprietor, is just one of the most accommodating landlords to be scared up, besides having fitted up his house in a style of superiority not often to be met with so far up in the mountains”. The hotel had a public hall which was frequently the site of dances and entertainments, such as Fourth of July celebrations. 1867, Mrs. Turney, now estranged from her husband, took over the hotel and renamed it the Cherokee Hotel. In 1871, a fire destroyed the Cherokee Hotel and saloon.

As noted above, mining prospects in the Cherokee area were not as promising as some of its neighboring towns, such as North Bloomfield. The principal mine, the Manzanita Mine, was owned by the Milton Mining and Water Company, which owned a number of other mines and ditches on the San Juan Ridge. In 1878, with mining in decline, the Manzanita Mine still produced almost $174,000 (~$4.95 million in 2024) dollars in gold.

As mining began to decline, so did the town. By 1880, the population had dropped to about 200. In 1895, one observer remarked that “the town is quiet owing to the suppression of hydraulic mining.” A few years before, the U.S. Army had estimated that 10,000,000 yards of gold bearing gravel had been excavated in the Cherokee area and that 33,000,000 yards remained. As late as World War I there was still some mining activity around Cherokee, with the Guggenheims believed to be financing some of it. In 1924, an historian noted that the town was reduced to “one store; and the people live principally by farming, very little active mining being carried on here.”

Cherokee Schoolhouse built 1872

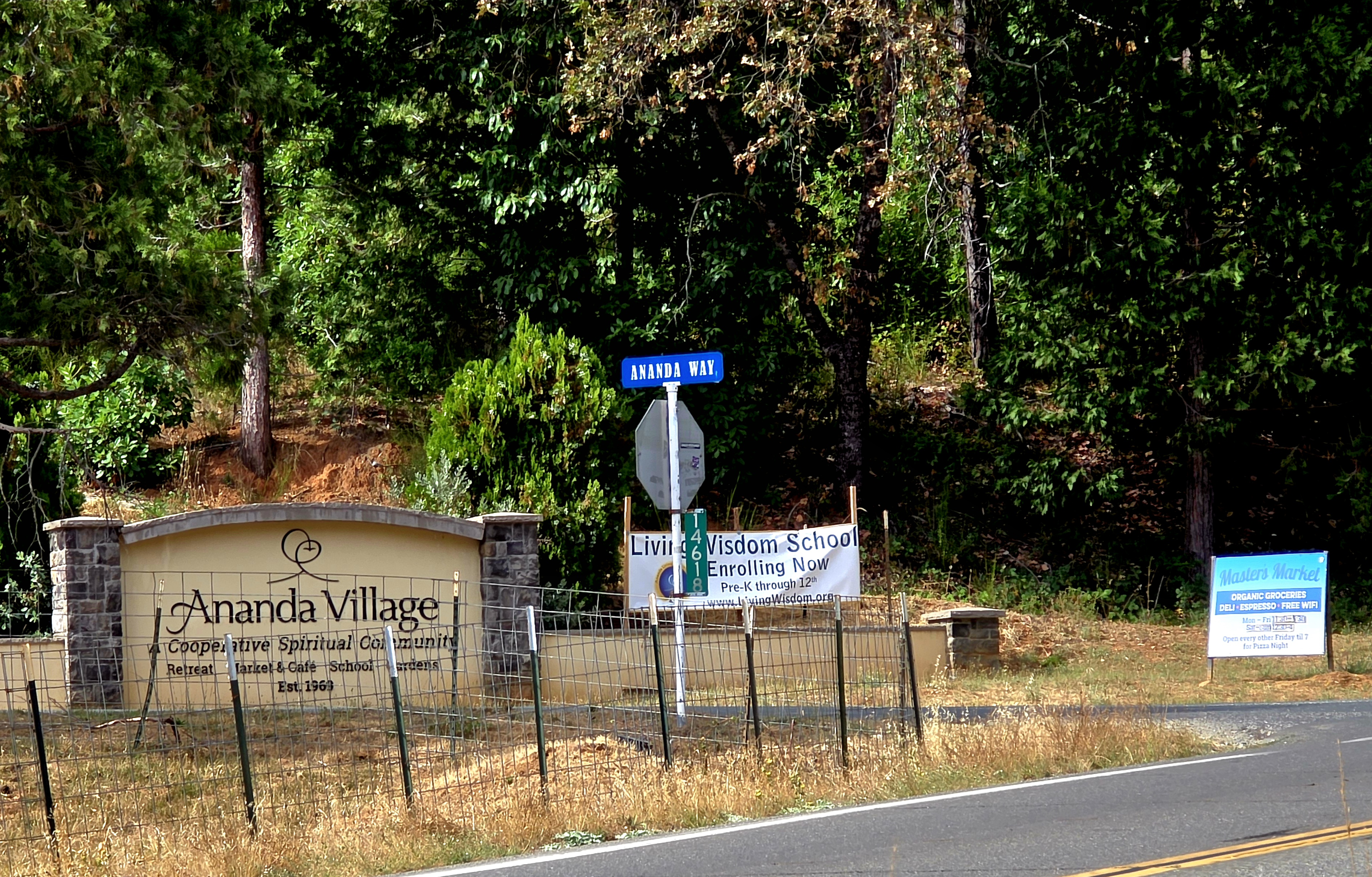
Ananda Village entrance

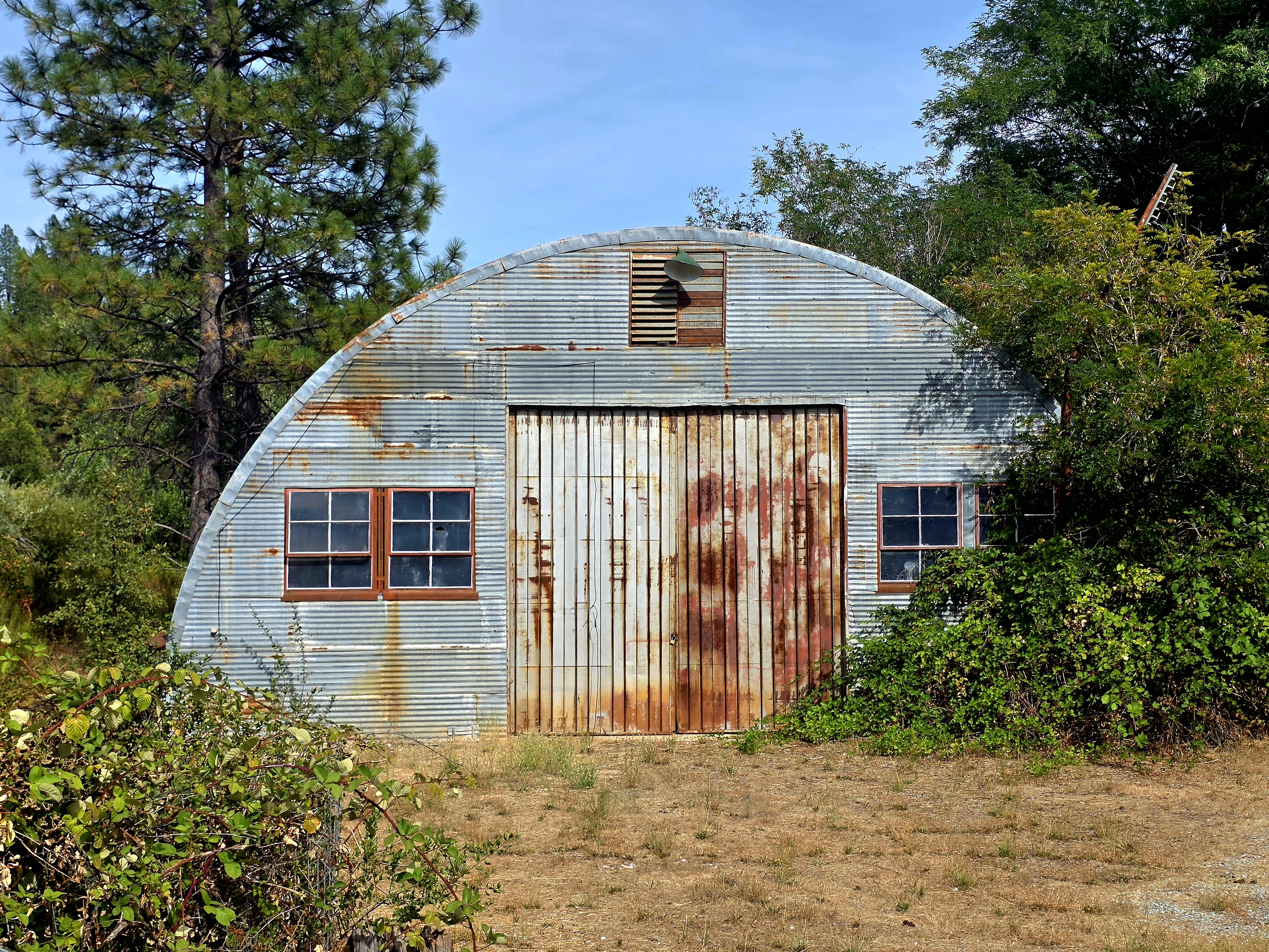
Quonset hut in Cherokee

Today, all that remains of Cherokee is the schoolhouse, located on Sages Road just north of Tyler Foote Crossing Road, the historic cemetery and a lot of land scarred by hydraulic mining. However, just northwest of the old townsite, Ananda Village, a spiritual community and retreat center, has grown up.
