= USS Cherokee (ID-458) =

Tugboat of the United States Navy

Coordinates: 38.84°N 74.8°W

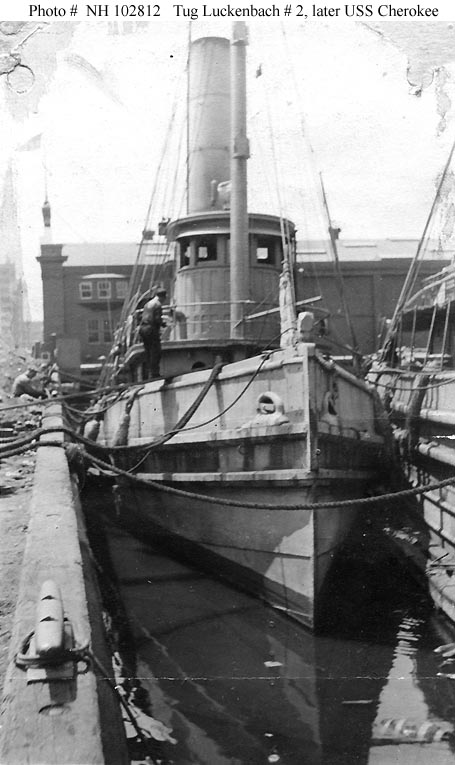
- Luckenbach Number 2 (American Tug, 1891) In port, probably when inspected by the Third Naval District in 1917.

History

United States
- Name: USS Cherokee (ID-458)
- Namesake: Cherokee
- Builder: John H. Dialogue & Sons
- Laid down: As Edgar F. Luckenbach
- Launched: 1891
- Acquired: 12 October 1917
- Commissioned: 5 December 1917
- Fate: Sank 26 February 1918

General characteristics
- Type: Tug
- Displacement: 272 long tons (276 t)
- Length: 120 ft (37 m)
- Beam: 24 ft 6 in (7.47 m)
- Draft: 15 ft (4.6 m)
- Speed: 12 kn (14 mph; 22 km/h)
- Complement: 42
- Armament: 1 × 3 in (76 mm) gun

USS Cherokee was a tugboat built in 1891 by John H. Dialogue & Sons in Camden, New Jersey, as Edgar F. Luckenbach (later renamed Luckenbach No. 2). The ship was purchased by the United States Navy and delivered at New York on 12 October 1917; and commissioned on 5 December 1917. She was renamed Cherokee, the third US Navy ship of that name, after the Cherokee Native American tribe, and given the identification number 458.

Outfitted for distant service at New York and at the Philadelphia Navy Yard, Cherokee cleared Newport, Rhode Island on 24 February 1918 for Washington, D.C. On 26 February, in a heavy gale, she foundered about 12 miles off Fenwick Island Light Vessel, with the loss of 30 of her crew. The tanker British Admiral rescued 12 survivors, two of whom died before the tanker reached port.
