= USS Cherokee (1859) =

Gunboat of the United States Navy

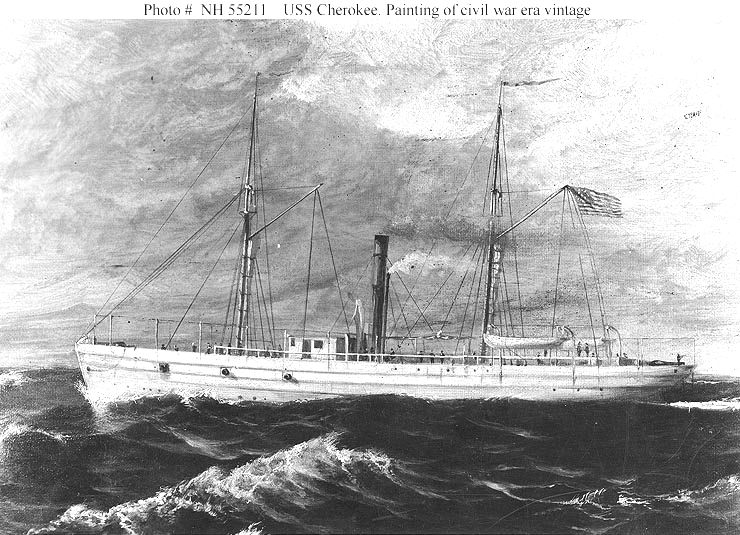

History

United States
- Namesake: Cherokee Tribe
- Laid down: 1859
- Acquired: 1864
- Commissioned: April 1864
- Decommissioned: 1865
- Renamed: Ancud
- Fate: Wrecked 1889

Chile
- Name: Ancud
- Namesake: Ship Ancud (1843)
- Operator: Chilean Navy
- Commissioned: 1865
- Decommissioned: 1878
- Fate: Sunk near Chiloé, on 25 August 1889

General characteristics
- Displacement: 606 ton
- Length: 194.5 ft (59.3 m)
- Beam: 25 ft (7.6 m)
- Draught: 11.5 ft (3.5 m)
- Speed: 13 kt
- Complement: 92
- Armour: 2 × 20-pdr. r., 4 × 24-pdr. sb.

The USS Cherokee was a 606-ton screw steam gunboat in the US Navy during the American Civil War ship. The ship later served in the Chilean Navy.

== Construction and British service ==
The steamer Thistle was launched on 2 July 1859 by Laurence Hill & Company at Port Glasgow, Scotland, for passenger and cargo service between Glasgow and Derry. She entered service for the Glasgow & Londonderry Steam Packet Company on 30 August. She was a composite-hulled (wood planking on iron frames) steamship, measured at 386 GRT and 206 NRT, and with dimensions of 184.5 ft (56.2 m) length, 25.2 ft (7.7 m) beam and 12.5 ft (3.8 m) depth of hold. Thistle's single-screw was powered by a two-cylinder geared beam engine of 150 NHP made by A. & J. Inglis of Glasgow, and which achieved a speed of 14 knots in trials on 29 August.

== Blockade runner ==
Under the name Thistle she was used as a blockade runner and in late January 1863 successfully ran through the Federal blockade into Charleston, South Carolina, a favorite port for blockade runners at the time. She ran aground while attempting to leave port a month later. The ship was salvaged, sold to another owner and renamed Cherokee. On 8 May 1863, she again attempted to an outbound passage, but was captured by USS Canandaigua. Prior to delivery to the Boston Prize Court on 7 July, she was used in the search for the Confederate raider CSS Tacony.

== US Navy Service ==
After condemnation, Cherokee was purchased by the Government, outfitted at Boston Navy Yard, and commissioned 21 April 1864, Acting Volunteer Lieutenant J. F. Nickels in command.

Cherokee sailed from Boston 11 May 1864, bound for duty off the coast of North Carolina with the North Atlantic Blockading Squadron. In addition to contributing to Union victory by cutting the Confederacy off from overseas sources of supply, this squadron repeatedly bombarded coastal defenses, and cooperated with the Army in amphibious expeditions up the many bays, inlets, and rivers of the serrated coast.

Cherokee's operations included the capture of blockade runner Emma Henry 8 December 1864, and bombardments at Fort Fisher, North Carolina, in December and January 1865. She participated in the two assaults that finally captured Fort Fisher, thus closing the port of Wilmington, N.C., to blockade-running.

On 30 January she was ordered close inshore at New Inlet to reconnoiter the Half Moon Battery, where she discovered a large party of Confederates approaching the fortifications recently secured by Union troops. Cherokee threw heavy fire ashore, which drove the Confederates away after three determined rushes at the Union lines.

In February 1865, Cherokee joined the East Gulf Blockading Squadron, and patrolled against blockade runners between Key West and Havana until the close of the war. Cherokee was sent north after the conclusion of the Civil War and was decommissioned at Boston 23 June 1865, and sold there 1 August 1865.

== Chilean Navy ==
In 1866 Cherokee returned to civilian trades. In 1868 the steamer was sold to the Chilean Government. She served Chile's Navy for a decade under the name Ancud and spent another decade as a merchant vessel. The former Cherokee sunk off Chiloé Island, Chile, on 25 August 1889.

== See also ==
- List of ships captured during the American Civil War
- List of steam frigates of the United States Navy
- Union Navy
- Confederate States Navy
