= Richland Springs Independent School District =

School district in Texas

Location
- Richland Springs, TX ESC Region 15 USA

District information
- Type: Public
- Grades: Pre-K through 12
- Superintendent: Jeff W. Kirby

Students and staff
- Athletic conference: UIL Class A (six-man football member)
- Colors: blue and white

Other information
- Mascot: coyote
- Website: Richland Springs ISD

Richland Springs Independent School District is a public school district based in Richland Springs, Texas, United States. The district's school, Richland Springs School, serves students in kindergarten through grade 12. In 2009, the school district was rated "academically acceptable" by the Texas Education Agency.

== Special programs ==
=== Athletics ===
Richland Springs won the 2004, 2006, 2007, 2010, 2011, 2012, 2015, and 2016 state six-man football championships. In 2009, the Coyotes moved from Division I for bigger six-man schools to Division II for smaller six-man schools. The 2007 team was nominated by Dave Campbell's Texas Football in its 50th-anniversary special as the 45th-most memorable team (professional, college, or high school) in Texas history.

== See also ==
- List of school districts in Texas
- List of high schools in Texas
