= Richland Springs, Texas =

- Town
- Nickname: Home of the fighting Coyotes
- Motto: Coyotes Fight Never Die
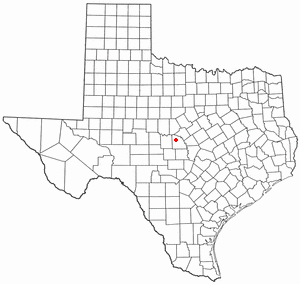
- Location of Richland Springs, Texas

- Coordinates: 31°16′17″N 98°56′55″W
- Country: United States
- State: Texas
- County: San Saba

Area
  - Total: 1.00 sq mi (2.60 km^{2})
  - Land: 1.00 sq mi (2.60 km^{2})
  - Water: 0 sq mi (0.00 km^{2})
- Elevation: 1,404 ft (428 m)

Population (2020)
  - Total: 244
  - Density: 243/sq mi (93.8/km^{2})
- Time zone: UTC-6 (Central (CST))
  - Summer (DST): UTC-5 (CDT)
- ZIP code: 76871
- Area code: 325
- FIPS code: 48-61880
- GNIS feature ID: 2412549
- Website: www.richlandsprings.texas.gov

Richland Springs is a town located in San Saba County, Texas, United States. Its population was 244 in 2020.

== History ==
Richland Springs developed in the 19th century as a supply and processing center for local cotton growers and cattlemen. Jackson J. Brown and his family settled near the springs on Richland Springs Creek (then known as Richland Creek) in December 1854 and were soon followed by the Tankersley and Duncan families. A private fort, Fort Duncan, was established near the springs in the late 1850s when trouble arose with Indians on the frontier, but it apparently fell into disuse shortly thereafter. The Brown School was constructed in 1868 and named for the neighborhood's original settler. The area attracted settlers through the 1870s, and in 1877, a Richland Springs post office opened in the store of Samuel E. Hays.

The community took its name from the nearby springs and from local enthusiasm for the agricultural promise of the region. By 1890, local production of cotton, grains, and livestock supported a settlement of 150 residents, including a justice of the peace precinct, a constabulary, and several commercial and craft businesses. A local newspaper, the Eye-Witness, began publication in 1905. Not long after, the First State Bank was organized, and in 1911, completion of a trunk line for the Gulf, Colorado and Santa Fe Railway linked the town with the main line between Galveston and Amarillo.

Richland Springs incorporated in 1932 and adopted a mayor-council form of city government. With a population nearing 500 and as many as 40 businesses, the town prospered until the onset of the Great Depression. World War II reversed the decline of the 1930s, and by the early 1950s, residents numbered 600. The number of businesses still had not returned to predepression levels when a three-year drought in the mid-1950s crippled the local economy again. The town's only bank failed, and within a decade, its residential and business populations had fallen by nearly half. An uneven recovery from the nadir of the 1960s was based on the production of local fruit and nut growers. In 1982, the town reported 420 residents and five businesses; by 1986, the number of businesses had risen to eight. In 1990, the town's population was 344, rising to 350 in 2000.

== Geography ==
According to the United States Census Bureau, the town has a total area of 1.0 square mile (2.6 km^{2}), all land.

=== Climate ===
The climate in this area is characterized by hot, humid summers and generally mild to cool winters. According to the Köppen climate classification, Richland Springs has a humid subtropical climate, Cfa on climate maps.

== Demographics ==
Historical population
Census	Pop.	Note	%±
1930	492		—
1940	541		10.0%
1950	584		7.9%
1960	331		−43.3%
1970	425		28.4%
1980	420		−1.2%
1990	344		−18.1%
2000	350		1.7%
2010	338		−3.4%
2020	244		−27.8%
U.S. Decennial Census

As of the census of 2020, 244 people and 69 households lived in the town. The population density was 244 inhabitants per square mile (94/km^{2}). The 156 housing units averaged 156 per square mile (60/km^{2}). The racial makeup of the town was 86.9% White, 1.2% Native American, 2.5% from other races, and 9.4% from two or more races. Hispanics or Latinos of any race were 13.1% of the population.

Of the 69 households, 12.1% had children under 18 living with them, 44.9% were married couples living together, 13.0% of all households were made up of individuals, and 10.1% had someone living alone who was 65 or older. The average household size was 3.58 and the average family size was 4.16.

The population was distributed as 20.1% under 18, 43.4% from 18 to 24, 7.8% from 25 to 44, 25.8% from 45 to 64, and 15.6% who were 65 or older. The median age was 18.9 years. For every 100 females, there were 38.9 males. For every 100 females 18 and over, there were 46.3 males.

In the town, the median income for a household was $23,563 and for a married couple family was $81,875. About 14.6% of the population were below the poverty line, including 6.7% of those under 18 and 29.0% of those 65 or over.

== Education ==
The Town of Richland Springs is served by the Richland Springs Independent School District. The district has one campus, Richland Springs ISD, that serves students in kindergarten through grade 12.

The Richland Springs Coyotes have appeared in 10 Texas state six-man football championships and have won nine of them.
