= San Saba Independent School District =

School district in Texas

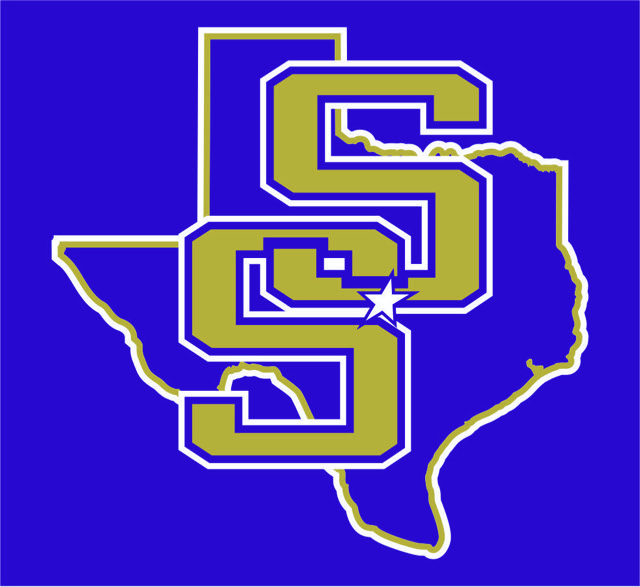
The school district's logo

San Saba Independent School District is a public school district based in San Saba, Texas United States. In addition to San Saba, the district also serves part of the community of Bend. The district's mascot is the Armadillo.

In 2009, the school district was rated "academically acceptable" by the Texas Education Agency.

== Schools ==
- San Saba High School (grades 9-12)
- San Saba Middle (grades 5-8)
- San Saba Elementary (prekindergarten-grade 4)
