= San Saba County, Texas =

County in Texas, United States

- County
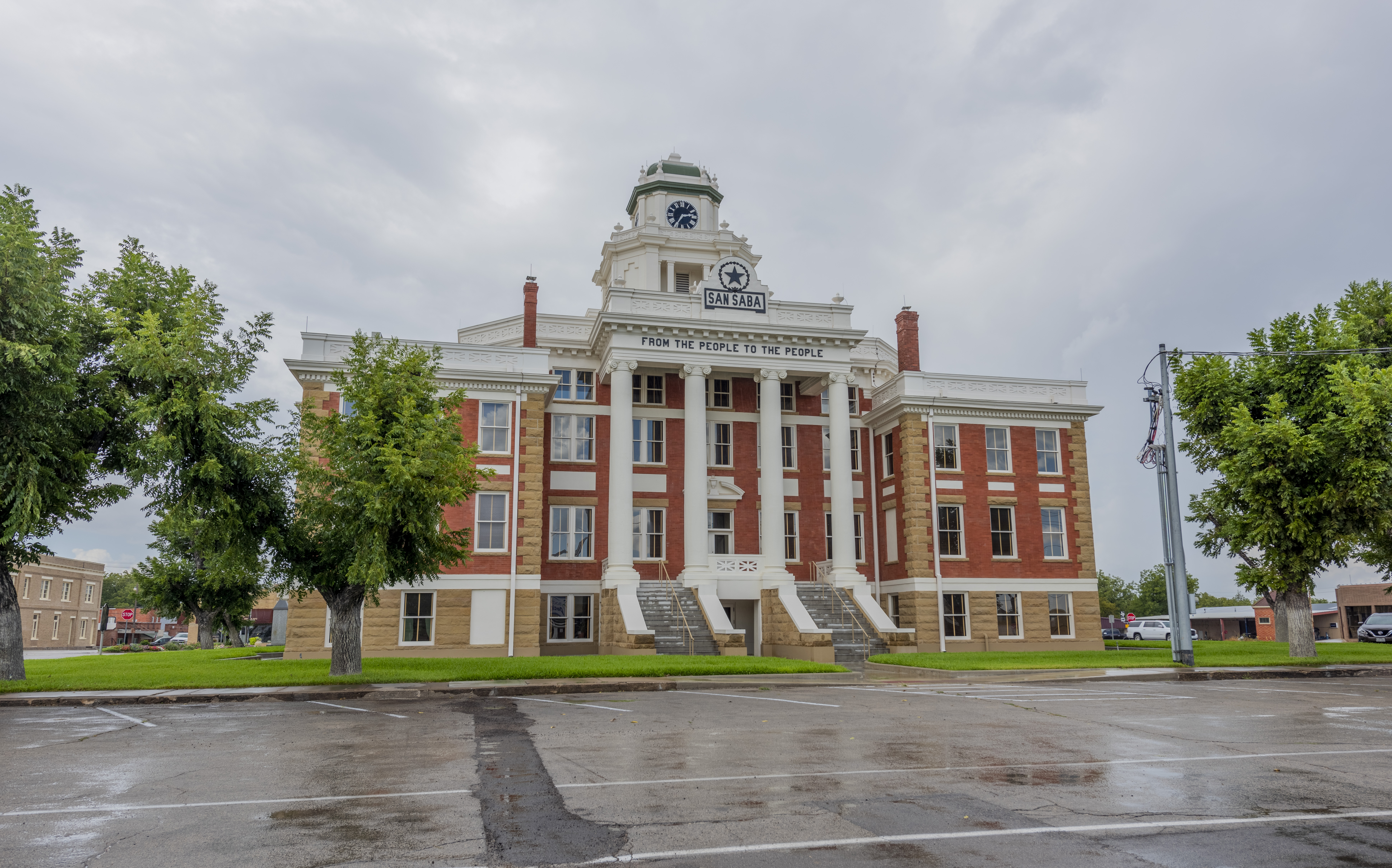
- The San Saba County Courthouse in San Saba with emblem "From the People to the People."

- Location within the U.S. state of Texas
- Coordinates: 31°10′N 98°49′W
- Country: United States
- State: Texas
- Founded: 1856
- Named for: San Saba River
- Seat: San Saba
- Largest town: San Saba

Area
  - Total: 1,138 sq mi (2,950 km^{2})
  - Land: 1,135 sq mi (2,940 km^{2})
  - Water: 3.1 sq mi (8.0 km^{2}) 0.3%

Population (2020)
  - Total: 5,730
  - Estimate (2025): 5,787 ▲
  - Density: 5.05/sq mi (1.95/km^{2})
- Time zone: UTC−6 (Central)
  - Summer (DST): UTC−5 (CDT)
- Congressional district: 11th
- Website: www.co.san-saba.tx.us

San Saba County is a county located on the Edwards Plateau in western Central Texas, United States. As of the 2020 census, its population was 5,730. Its county seat is San Saba. The county is named after the San Saba River, which flows through the county.

== History ==
=== Early history ===
Early Native American inhabitants of the area included Tonkawa, Caddo, Lipan Apache, and Comanche. In 1732, Governor of Spanish Texas, Juan Antonio Bustillo y Ceballos, arrived on the feast day of sixth-century monk St. Sabbas, and named the river Río de San Sabá de las Nueces. Santa Cruz de San Sabá Mission was established in 1757. In 1788, José Mares led an expedition from San Antonio to Santa Fe.

In 1828, 28 people from Stephen F. Austin's group passed through. A portion of the county was included in Austin's grants from the Mexican government. The Fisher–Miller Land Grant in 1842 contained most of later land deeds. Five years later, the Meusebach–Comanche Treaty was signed in San Saba County. In 1854, the Harkey family settled at Wallace and Richland Creeks. The David Matsler family moved from Burnet County to Cherokee Creek.

San Saba County was organized from Bexar County and named for the San Saba River in 1856. San Saba was selected as the county seat. The Seventh Texas Legislature confirmed the boundaries of the county in 1858. in 1860, the population was 913, which included 98 slaves. The county was divided into 10 school districts in 1867.

In 1874, Edmund E. Risen devoted his work to improving local nuts, in particular the pecan. San Saba eventually billed itself as the Pecan Capital of the World.

=== Post-Civil War history ===
In the 1880s-'90s, mob rule not only whipped and forced out numerous people in towns throughout Texas, but also took 140 lives in Texas following the Civil War. San Saba County had the worst of the violence, with 25 lives taken by lynching from 1880 to 1896. An investigation led to the Texas Rangers restoring order. "The San Saba County lynchers, the deadliest of the lot, claimed some 25 victims between 1880 and 1896.

The San Saba Male and Female Academy was founded in 1882. In 1889, the United Confederate Veterans William P. Rogers Camp No. 322 was established, named for Col. William P. Rogers. West Texas Normal and Business College was organized by Francis Marion Behrns in 1885.

=== Late 19th and 20th centuries ===
The parallel-wire suspension Beveridge Bridge was built across the San Saba River in 1896 by Flinn, Moyer Bridge Co. In 1911, the Lometa-Eden branch of the Gulf, Colorado, and Santa Fe Railway was built through San Saba County. San Saba County brick and sandstone courthouse is erected. Architect Chamberlin & Co. In 1930, half of the county farms were tenant farmed. In 1931, pioneer rancher W.H. "Uncle Billy" Gibbons gave the Boy Scouts of America a 99-year lease to campgrounds along Brady Creek on the historic Gibbons Ranch. Relocated several miles upstream in 1946, the Boy Scouts continue to use Camp Billy Gibbons to this day. The 1938 San Saba River floods caused county-wide devastation. One-third of the town of San Saba was under water. The Town of San Saba was incorporated in 1940. Prolonged drought in the mid-1950s brought hardship to the county agricultural economy.

The San Saba County News merged with the San Saba Star in 1960. In 1965, a historical marker was erected to honor pioneer doctor Edward D. Doss.

== Geography ==
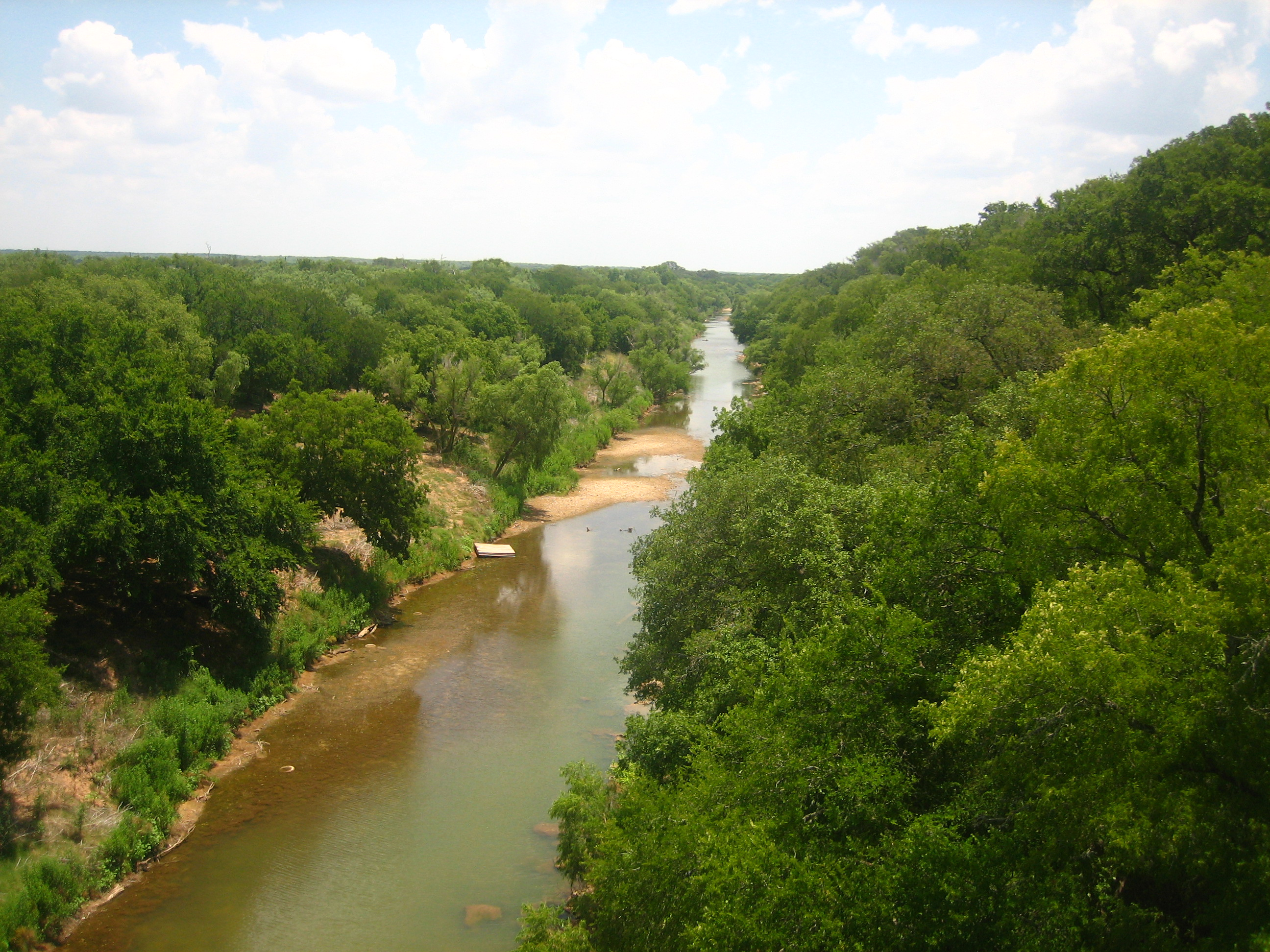
The Colorado River of Texas, from the Regency Suspension Bridge, on the border of Mills and San Saba Counties

According to the U.S. Census Bureau, the county has a total area of 1,138 square miles (2,950 km^{2}), of which 1,135 square miles (2,940 km^{2}) are land and 3.1 square miles (8.0 km^{2}) (0.3%) are covered by water.

=== Major highways ===
- U.S. Highway 190
- State Highway 16
- State Highway 71
- Farm to Market Road 45

=== Adjacent counties ===
- Mills County (north)
- Lampasas County (east)
- Burnet County (southeast)
- Llano County (south)
- Mason County (southwest)
- McCulloch County (west)
- Brown County (northwest)

== Demographics ==
Historical population
| Census | Pop. | Note | %± |
|---|---|---|---|
| 1860 | 913 | | — |
| 1870 | 1,425 | | 56.1% |
| 1880 | 5,324 | | 273.6% |
| 1890 | 6,641 | | 24.7% |
| 1900 | 7,569 | | 14.0% |
| 1920 | 10,045 | | — |
| 1930 | 10,273 | | 2.3% |
| 1940 | 11,012 | | 7.2% |
| 1950 | 8,666 | | −21.3% |
| 1960 | 6,381 | | −26.4% |
| 1970 | 5,540 | | −13.2% |
| 1980 | 5,693 | | 2.8% |
| 1990 | 5,401 | | −5.1% |
| 2000 | 6,186 | | 14.5% |
| 2010 | 6,131 | | −0.9% |
| 2020 | 5,730 | | −6.5% |
| 2025 (est.) | 5,787 | ▲ | 1.0% |
U.S. Decennial Census; 1850–2010 2010 2020

=== Racial and ethnic composition ===
San Saba County, Texas – Racial and ethnic composition Note: the US Census treats Hispanic/Latino as an ethnic category. This table excludes Latinos from the racial categories and assigns them to a separate category. Hispanics/Latinos may be of any race.
| Race / Ethnicity (NH = Non-Hispanic) | Pop 1980 | Pop 1990 | Pop 2000 | Pop 2010 | Pop 2020 | % 1980 | % 1990 | % 2000 | % 2010 | % 2020 |
|---|---|---|---|---|---|---|---|---|---|---|
| White alone (NH) | 5,166 | 4,373 | 4,622 | 4,135 | 3,690 | 83.27% | 80.97% | 74.72% | 67.44% | 64.40% |
| Black or African American alone (NH) | 29 | 13 | 160 | 194 | 106 | 0.47% | 0.24% | 2.59% | 3.16% | 1.85% |
| Native American or Alaska Native alone (NH) | 13 | 8 | 26 | 28 | 29 | 0.21% | 0.15% | 0.42% | 0.46% | 0.51% |
| Asian alone (NH) | 10 | 1 | 5 | 13 | 16 | 0.16% | 0.02% | 0.08% | 0.21% | 0.28% |
| Native Hawaiian or Pacific Islander alone (NH) | x | x | 0 | 0 | 1 | x | x | 0.00% | 0.00% | 0.02% |
| Other race alone (NH) | 18 | 8 | 6 | 1 | 10 | 0.29% | 0.15% | 0.10% | 0.02% | 0.17% |
| Mixed race or Multiracial (NH) | x | x | 34 | 45 | 129 | x | x | 0.55% | 0.73% | 2.25% |
| Hispanic or Latino (any race) | 968 | 998 | 1,333 | 1,715 | 1,749 | 15.60% | 18.48% | 21.55% | 27.97% | 30.52% |
| Total | 6,204 | 5,401 | 6,186 | 6,131 | 5,730 | 100.00% | 100.00% | 100.00% | 100.00% | 100.00% |

=== 2020 census ===
As of the 2020 census, the county had a population of 5,730. The median age was 42.8 years, with 19.6% of residents under the age of 18 and 24.0% of residents 65 years of age or older. For every 100 females there were 81.2 males, and for every 100 females age 18 and over there were 76.5 males age 18 and over.

There were 2,141 households in the county, of which 27.7% had children under 18 living in them. Married-couple households made up 51.2% of all households, 18.8% were headed by a male householder with no spouse or partner present, and 25.7% were headed by a female householder with no spouse or partner present. About 28.7% of households were composed of individuals and 16.2% had someone living alone who was 65 years of age or older.

The racial makeup of the county was 74.6% White, 2.1% Black or African American, 0.7% American Indian and Alaska Native, 0.3% Asian, <0.1% Native Hawaiian and Pacific Islander, 12.9% from some other race, and 9.3% from two or more races. Hispanic or Latino residents of any race comprised 30.5% of the population.

<0.1% of residents lived in urban areas, while 100.0% lived in rural areas.

=== 2010 census ===
As of the 2010 census, 6,131 people, 2,289 households, and 1,616 families resided in the county. The population density was 6 people per square mile (2.3 people/km^{2}). The 2,951 housing units averaged 3 units per square mile (1.2 units/km^{2}). The racial makeup of the county was 84.50% White, 2.73% Black or African American, 1.07% Native American, 0.11% Asian, 10.52% from other races, and 1.07% from two or more races. About 21.6% of the population was Hispanic or Latino of any race.

Of the 2,289 households, 29.10% had children under the age of 18 living with them, 58.90% were married couples living together, 8.40% had a female householder with no husband present, and 29.40% were not families. About 27.5% of all households were made up of individuals, and 15.90% had someone living alone who was 65 years of age or older. The average household size was 2.45 and the average family size was 2.97.

In the county, the population was distributed as 27.90% under the age of 18, 8.20% from 18 to 24, 20.80% from 25 to 44, 22.80% from 45 to 64, and 20.30% who were 65 years of age or older. The median age was 39 years. For every 100 females, there were 107.40 males. For every 100 females age 18 and over, there were 97.10 males.

The median income for a household in the county was $30,104, and for a family was $35,255. Males had a median income of $25,334 versus $20,111 for females. The per capita income for the county was $15,309. About 13.30% of families and 16.60% of the population were below the poverty line, including 24.50% of those under age 18 and 11.60% of those age 65 or over.

== Attractions ==
San Saba County is home to the only suspension bridge open to traffic in the state; the Regency Bridge spanning the Colorado River, located off FM 500 in the northern part of the county, was built in 1939.

The Beveridge Bridge, built in 1896 spanning the San Saba River, was the only other suspension bridge in Texas open to traffic until 2004, when it was replaced by a concrete bridge. The Beveridge Bridge, since restored and open as a pedestrian bridge, is located on the northwest edge of the city of San Saba, on China Creek Road, just north of the Wedding Oak.

San Saba County has produced more Texas six-man football state championships than any other county in Texas. The towns of Richland Springs (Richland Springs Coyotes) and Cherokee (Cherokee Indians) have won a total of 11 state championships. Richland Springs has appeared in a total of 9 state championship games and has won eight of them (2004, 2006, 2007, 2010, 2011, 2012, 2015, 2016). Cherokee has appeared in a total of four state championship games and has won three of them (1973, 1975, 1978).

== Communities ==
=== Towns ===
- Richland Springs
- San Saba (county seat)

=== Unincorporated communities ===
- Algerita
- Bend (partly in Lampasas County)
- Bowser
- Chappel
- Cherokee
- Elm Grove
- Hall
- Harkeyville
- Locker
- McMillan
- Skeeterville
- Sloan
- Spring Creek

== Notable people ==
Actor Tommy Lee Jones was born in San Saba and owns a ranch outside of town. Aaron Behrens, front man for Austin-based music group Ghostland Observatory.

== Politics ==
United States presidential election results for San Saba County, Texas
| Year | Republican | | Democratic | | Third party(ies) | |
| Year | No. | % | No. | % | No. | % |
|---|---|---|---|---|---|---|
| 1912 | 39 | 4.16% | 692 | 73.77% | 207 | 22.07% |
| 1916 | 66 | 6.02% | 935 | 85.31% | 95 | 8.67% |
| 1920 | 180 | 12.20% | 874 | 59.21% | 422 | 28.59% |
| 1924 | 187 | 9.27% | 1,814 | 89.94% | 16 | 0.79% |
| 1928 | 682 | 47.56% | 752 | 52.44% | 0 | 0.00% |
| 1932 | 122 | 6.02% | 1,904 | 93.89% | 2 | 0.10% |
| 1936 | 147 | 8.89% | 1,505 | 90.99% | 2 | 0.12% |
| 1940 | 221 | 8.74% | 2,304 | 91.14% | 3 | 0.12% |
| 1944 | 177 | 7.40% | 2,109 | 88.13% | 107 | 4.47% |
| 1948 | 184 | 7.99% | 2,050 | 89.01% | 69 | 3.00% |
| 1952 | 900 | 33.92% | 1,752 | 66.04% | 1 | 0.04% |
| 1956 | 797 | 35.87% | 1,419 | 63.86% | 6 | 0.27% |
| 1960 | 849 | 40.28% | 1,251 | 59.35% | 8 | 0.38% |
| 1964 | 418 | 18.36% | 1,859 | 81.64% | 0 | 0.00% |
| 1968 | 535 | 25.00% | 1,140 | 53.27% | 465 | 21.73% |
| 1972 | 1,106 | 65.79% | 567 | 33.73% | 8 | 0.48% |
| 1976 | 582 | 29.03% | 1,408 | 70.22% | 15 | 0.75% |
| 1980 | 948 | 39.75% | 1,405 | 58.91% | 32 | 1.34% |
| 1984 | 1,566 | 59.16% | 1,070 | 40.42% | 11 | 0.42% |
| 1988 | 1,099 | 48.27% | 1,165 | 51.16% | 13 | 0.57% |
| 1992 | 723 | 34.38% | 716 | 34.05% | 664 | 31.57% |
| 1996 | 991 | 51.72% | 726 | 37.89% | 199 | 10.39% |
| 2000 | 1,691 | 72.48% | 618 | 26.49% | 24 | 1.03% |
| 2004 | 1,894 | 77.91% | 529 | 21.76% | 8 | 0.33% |
| 2008 | 1,941 | 79.00% | 487 | 19.82% | 29 | 1.18% |
| 2012 | 1,905 | 84.33% | 323 | 14.30% | 31 | 1.37% |
| 2016 | 2,025 | 85.91% | 293 | 12.43% | 39 | 1.65% |
| 2020 | 2,308 | 88.70% | 287 | 11.03% | 7 | 0.27% |
| 2024 | 2,412 | 89.04% | 276 | 10.19% | 21 | 0.78% |

United States Senate election results for San Saba County, Texas1
| Year | Republican | | Democratic | | Third party(ies) | |
| Year | No. | % | No. | % | No. | % |
|---|---|---|---|---|---|---|
| 2024 | 2,314 | 86.02% | 333 | 12.38% | 43 | 1.60% |

United States Senate election results for San Saba County, Texas2
| Year | Republican | | Democratic | | Third party(ies) | |
| Year | No. | % | No. | % | No. | % |
|---|---|---|---|---|---|---|
| 2020 | 2,218 | 88.72% | 270 | 10.80% | 12 | 0.48% |

Texas Gubernatorial election results for San Saba County
| Year | Republican | | Democratic | | Third party(ies) | |
| Year | No. | % | No. | % | No. | % |
|---|---|---|---|---|---|---|
| 2022 | 1,947 | 89.93% | 200 | 9.24% | 18 | 0.83% |

== See also ==
- Adelsverein
- The Ballad of Buster Scruggs
- German Texan
- List of museums in Central Texas
- National Register of Historic Places listings in San Saba County, Texas
- Recorded Texas Historic Landmarks in San Saba County
