= San Saba, Texas =

- City
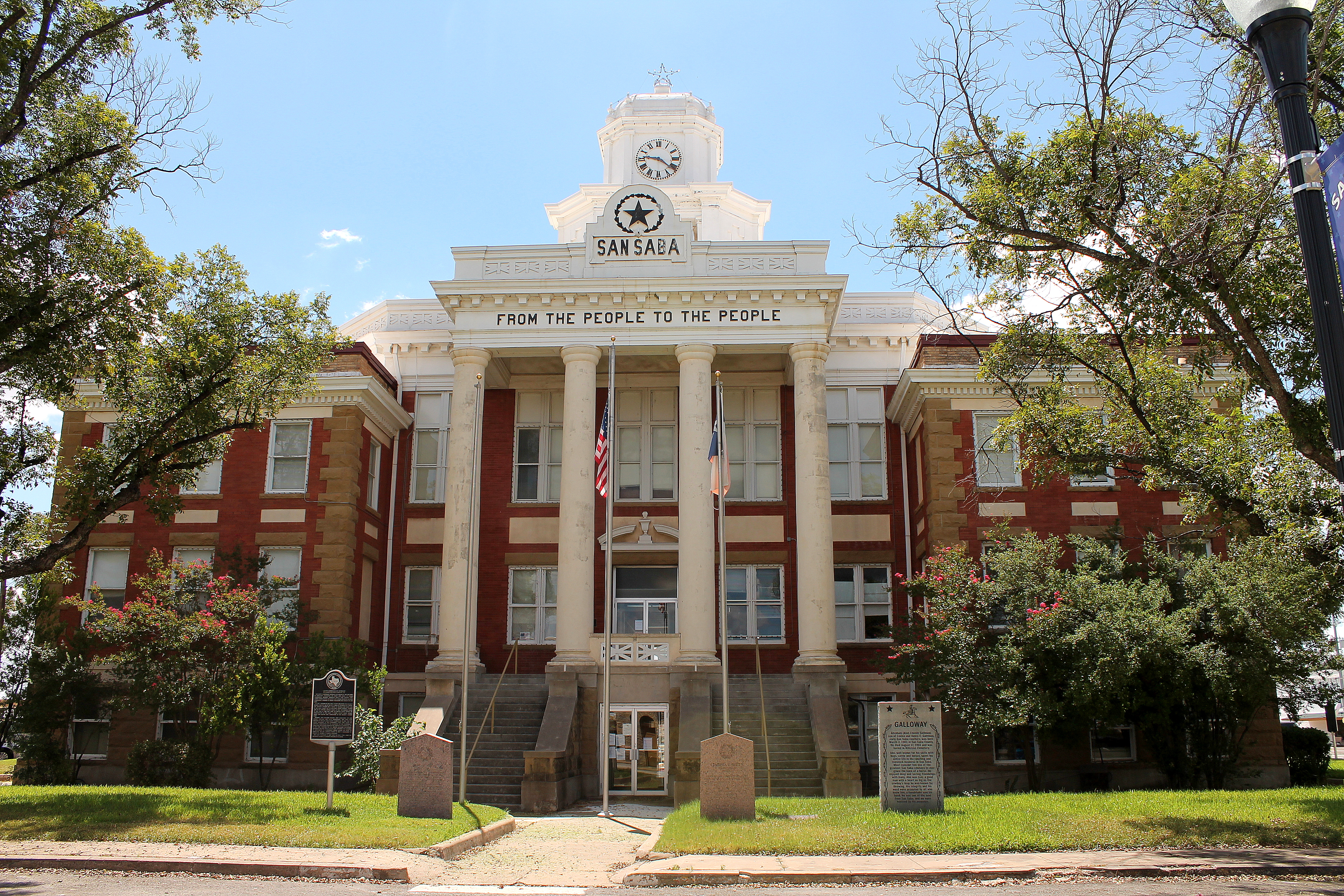
- San Saba Courthouse
- Nickname: The Pecan Capital of the World
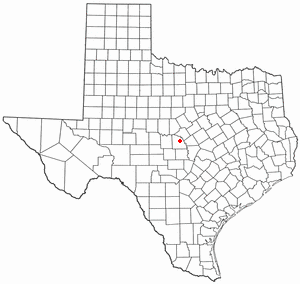
- Location of San Saba, Texas

- Coordinates: 31°11′54″N 98°44′20″W
- Country: United States
- State: Texas
- County: San Saba

Area
  - Total: 2.71 sq mi (7.02 km^{2})
  - Land: 2.71 sq mi (7.02 km^{2})
  - Water: 0 sq mi (0.00 km^{2})
- Elevation: 1,207 ft (368 m)

Population (2020)
  - Total: 3,117
  - Density: 1,151/sq mi (444.3/km^{2})
- Time zone: UTC-6 (Central (CST))
  - Summer (DST): UTC-5 (CDT)
- ZIP code: 76877
- Area code: 325
- FIPS code: 48-65648
- GNIS feature ID: 2413254
- Website: City of San Saba, Texas

San Saba is a city in and the county seat of San Saba County, Texas, United States. It was settled in 1854 and named for its location on the San Saba River and for Sabbas the Sanctified. As of the 2020 census, San Saba had a population of 3,117.

== Geography ==
According to the United States Census Bureau, the city has a total area of 1.8 sq mi (4.7 km^{2}), all land. The city is located 105 mi (169.0 km) northwest of Austin, and 141 mi (226.9 km) miles north of San Antonio.

=== Climate ===
The climate in this area is characterized by hot, humid summers and generally mild to cool winters. According to the Köppen climate classification, San Saba has a humid subtropical climate, Cfa on climate maps.

== Demographics ==
Historical population
| Census | Pop. | Note | %± |
|---|---|---|---|
| 1860 | 111 | | — |
| 1870 | 168 | | 51.4% |
| 1880 | 598 | | 256.0% |
| 1890 | 697 | | 16.6% |
| 1920 | 2,011 | | — |
| 1930 | 2,240 | | 11.4% |
| 1940 | 2,927 | | 30.7% |
| 1950 | 3,400 | | 16.2% |
| 1960 | 2,728 | | −19.8% |
| 1970 | 2,555 | | −6.3% |
| 1980 | 2,850 | | 11.5% |
| 1990 | 2,626 | | −7.9% |
| 2000 | 2,637 | | 0.4% |
| 2010 | 3,099 | | 17.5% |
| 2020 | 3,117 | | 0.6% |
U.S. Decennial Census

=== 2020 census ===
As of the 2020 census, San Saba had a population of 3,117 people, 1,021 households, and 666 families. The population density was 1,150.6 per square mile (444.3/km^{2}), and the 1,209 housing units had an average density of 446.3 per square mile (172.3/km^{2}).

There were 1,021 households in San Saba, of which 33.3% had children under the age of 18 living in them; 42.6% were married-couple households, 20.0% were households with a male householder and no spouse or partner present, and 31.5% were households with a female householder and no spouse or partner present. About 30.6% of all households were made up of individuals, and 15.9% had someone living alone who was 65 years of age or older. The average household size was 2.5 and the average family size was 3.2. There were 1,209 housing units, of which 15.6% were vacant; the homeowner vacancy rate was 2.0% and the rental vacancy rate was 13.5%. 0.0% of residents lived in urban areas, while 100.0% lived in rural areas.

The city's age distribution was 22.2% under 18, 9.0% from 18 to 24, 31.2% from 25 to 44, 21.3% from 45 to 64, and 16.3% who were 65 or older; the median age was 35.3 years. For every 100 females, there were 66.0 males, and for every 100 females age 18 and over there were 58.1 males.

The racial makeup was 63.36% White, (48.67% non-Hispanic White), 3.53% Black or African American, 0.58% Native American or Alaska Native, 0.55% Asian, 0.06% Pacific Islander or Native Hawaiian, 20.44% from other races, and 11.49% from two or more races. Hispanics or Latinos of any race were 45.43% of the population.

Racial composition as of the 2020 census
| Race | Number | Percent |
|---|---|---|
| White | 1,975 | 63.4% |
| Black or African American | 110 | 3.5% |
| American Indian and Alaska Native | 18 | 0.6% |
| Asian | 17 | 0.5% |
| Native Hawaiian and Other Pacific Islander | 2 | 0.1% |
| Some other race | 637 | 20.4% |
| Two or more races | 358 | 11.5% |
| Hispanic or Latino (of any race) | 1,416 | 45.4% |

San Saba racial composition (NH = Non-Hispanic) (Note: Note: the US Census treats Hispanic/Latino as an ethnic category. This table excludes Latinos from the racial categories and assigns them to a separate category. Hispanics/Latinos can be of any race.)
| Race | Number | Percentage |
|---|---|---|
| White (NH) | 1,517 | 48.67% |
| Black or African American (NH) | 98 | 3.14% |
| Native American or Alaska Native (NH) | 12 | 0.38% |
| Asian (NH) | 16 | 0.51% |
| Pacific Islander (NH) | 1 | 0.03% |
| Multiracial (NH) | 57 | 1.83% |
| Hispanic or Latino | 1,416 | 45.43% |
| Total | 3,117 | |

The percentage of those with a bachelor's degree or higher was estimated to be 6.0% of the population.

The 2016–2020 five-year American Community Survey estimates showed that the median household income was $31,181 (with a margin of error of +/- $5,672) and the median family income was $40,083 (+/- $10,742). Males had a median income of $26,071 (+/- $9,347) versus $15,690 (+/- $7,740) for females. The median income for those above 16 years old was $23,354 (+/- $5,715). About 14.2% of families and 20.2% of the population were below the poverty line, including 37.4% of those under 18 and 8.7% of those 65 or over.

=== 2010 census ===
As of the 2010 census, 3,099 people, 1,008 households, and 680 families resided in the city. The population density was 1,468.6 people/sq mi (565.6/km^{2}). The 1,177 housing units averaged 655.5/sq mi (252.5/km^{2}). The racial makeup of the city was 78.54% White, 0.64% African American, 1.74% Native American, 0.11% Asian, 17.33% from other races, and 1.63% from two or more races. Hispanics or Latinos of any race were 31.51% of the population.

Of the 1,008 households, 30.9% had children under 18 living with them, 52.2% were married couples living together, 11.8% had a female householder with no husband present, and 32.5% were not families. About 30.9% of all households were made up of individuals, and 18.7% had someone living alone who was 65 or older. The average household size was 2.50, and the average family size was 3.12.

The population was distributed as 27.0% under 18, 6.5% from 18 to 24, 23.7% from 25 to 44, 20.1% from 45 to 64, and 22.7% who were 65 or older. The median age was 39 years. For every 100 females, there were 82.4 males. For every 100 females age 18 and over, there were 79.2 males.

The median income for a household in the city was $27,758 and for a family was $31,582. Males had a median income of $24,207 versus $20,216 for females. The per capita income for the city was $14,192. About 16.0% of families and 19.6% of the population were below the poverty line, including 29.9% of those under 18 and 12.1% of those 65 or over.

== Economy ==
Pecans emerged as an important crop, largely because of the work of Edmund E. Risien, an Englishman who moved to San Saba County in 1874, and made improvement of the native nuts his life's work. Risien founded the West Texas Pecan Nursery at the junction of the San Saba and Colorado Rivers. The "Mother Pecan Tree", located in the heart of this orchard, has been used to produce many great pecan varieties. Some of these include the 'San Saba Improved', 'Texas Prolific', 'Onliwon', Squirrel Delight', 'No. 60', and 'Western Schley', and these are just a few of the varieties this tree has produced.

Risien's customer base included Queen Victoria of the United Kingdom, Alfred Lord Tennyson, and the Post Cereals Co. He is credited for laying the groundwork for the pecan industry that led San Saba County to proclaim itself "Pecan Capital of the World".

== Education ==
The City of San Saba is served by the San Saba Independent School District. Its schools include San Saba Elementary, serving students in kindergarten-grade 4; San Saba Middle School, serving grades 5–8; and San Saba High School, grades 9–12. The school district opened two new facilities in October 2013 - an elementary building meant to host all elementary grades under one roof, and a set of science labs in a building immediately across from the main entrance to the high school.

== Notable people ==
- M. King Hubbert, geologist
- Tommy Lee Jones, actor
- Thomas Stewart, opera singer
