= Cashion Community, Texas =

- City
- Location of Cashion Community, Texas
- Coordinates: 34°02′11″N 98°30′29″W
- Country: United States
- State: Texas
- County: Wichita

Area
  - Total: 1.90 sq mi (4.91 km^{2})
  - Land: 1.90 sq mi (4.91 km^{2})
  - Water: 0 sq mi (0.00 km^{2})
- Elevation: 1,030 ft (310 m)

Population (2020)
  - Total: 286
  - Density: 151/sq mi (58.2/km^{2})
- Time zone: UTC-6 (Central (CST))
  - Summer (DST): UTC-5 (CDT)
- Zip Code: 76305
- FIPS code: 48-13198
- GNIS feature ID: 2409404

Cashion Community (commonly called Cashion) is a city in Wichita County, Texas, United States. It was incorporated in 2000, and had a population of 286 in 2020. Cashion Community is part of the Wichita Falls, Texas metropolitan statistical area.

== Geography ==
Cashion Community is located eight miles north of Wichita Falls off State Highway 240 in northeastern Wichita County. Its elevation is 994 feet above mean sea level. The city has a total area of 1.9 square miles (4.9 km^{2}), all land.

== History ==
Settlement in the area began about 1897, when Hi Willis purchased land. A one-room schoolhouse was built on donated land and named for T.J. Cashion, a county commissioner. The school became the center of the community. Oil was discovered in 1918, which led to a significant influx of residents. In the 1920s, the Cooper, Friberg, and Bacon school consolidated with Cashion and eventually the campus was expanded to accommodate a four-year high school.

Oil production declined in the 1930s and the high school closed in 1936. Its furnishings were auctioned off in 1945 and Cashion area students attended school in the larger community of Burkburnett. A Texas Historical Marker, erected in 1993, honors Cashion School.

Voting to become a city was January 15, 2000. Mayor election was May 6, 2000, with Thomas J. Lowry Sr. serving as its first mayor. Preston Giles was the first councilman, Dorothy Bradley was the first councilwoman, and Pat Giles was the first city secretary.

== Demographics ==
Historical population
Census	Pop.	Note	%±
2010	348		—
2020	286		−17.8%
U.S. Decennial Census

=== 2020 census ===
As of the 2020 census, Cashion Community had a population of 286, 124 households, and 74 families residing in the city. The median age was 45.0 years, with 23.1% of residents under the age of 18 and 25.2% 65 years of age or older; for every 100 females there were 113.4 males and for every 100 females age 18 and over there were 93.0 males age 18 and over.

0% of residents lived in urban areas, while 100.0% lived in rural areas.

There were 124 households in Cashion Community, of which 41.1% had children under the age of 18 living in them. Of all households, 53.2% were married-couple households, 16.9% were households with a male householder and no spouse or partner present, and 25.0% were households with a female householder and no spouse or partner present. About 24.2% of all households were made up of individuals and 16.1% had someone living alone who was 65 years of age or older.

There were 135 housing units, of which 8.1% were vacant. Among occupied housing units, 75.8% were owner-occupied and 24.2% were renter-occupied. The homeowner vacancy rate was <0.1% and the rental vacancy rate was <0.1%.

Cashion Community racial composition (NH = Non-Hispanic) (Note: Note: the US Census treats Hispanic/Latino as an ethnic category. This table excludes Latinos from the racial categories and assigns them to a separate category. Hispanics/Latinos can be of any race.)
Race	Number	Percentage
White (NH)	233	81.47%
Black or African American (NH)	5	1.75%
Asian (NH)	8	2.8%
Mixed/Multi-Racial (NH)	10	3.5%
Hispanic or Latino	30	10.49%
Total	286	

== Education ==
Cashion Community is served by the Burkburnett Independent School District.
