= List of state highway loops in Texas (1–99) =

- Texas State Highway Loop marker

Highway names
- Interstates: Interstate Highway X (IH-X, I-X)
- US Highways: U.S. Highway X (US X)
- State: State Highway X (SH X)
- Loops: Loop X
- Spurs: Spur X
- Farm or Ranch to Market Roads: Farm to Market Road X (FM X); Ranch-to-Market Road X (RM X)
- Park Roads: Park Road X (PR X)

System links
- Highways in Texas; Interstate; US; State; Former; Toll; Loops; Spurs; FM/RM; Park; Rec

State highway loops in Texas are owned and maintained by the Texas Department of Transportation (TxDOT).

== Loop 1 ==
State Highway Loop 1
- Location: Travis and Williamson counties
- Length: 25.698 mi (41.357 km)
- Existed: October 27, 1967–present

Loop 1, known as Mopac Expressway or Mopac Boulevard, is a freeway around the west side of Austin.

== Loop 2 ==
State Highway Loop 2
- Location: McLennan County
- Length: 1.419 mi (2.284 km)
- Existed: September 26, 1939–present

Loop 2 is located in Waco. It runs from I-35 to US 84.

Loop 2 was designated on September 26, 1939, from US 81 though Waco to another point on US 81, as a renumbering of SH 2 Bypass. On November 29, 1955, the section from 18th Street and Washington Street northeast along Washington Street and Elm Street to US 81 was cancelled, and Loop 2 was instead extended west to new US 84; the old route became Spur 298 and Spur 299 in 1956. On August 5, 1966, the southern terminus was moved to US 77. On October 2, 1970, the section from I-35 to Loop 491 (now Bus. US 77) was redesignated as part of a rerouted US 77.

== Loop 3 ==
State Highway Loop 3
- Location: Comal County
- Existed: September 26, 1939–November 5, 1971

Loop 3 was located in New Braunfels.

Loop 3 was designated on September 26, 1939, from US 81 via New Braunfels to US 81 as a renumbering of SH 2 Bypass. On September 16, 1960, the section from SH 46 to I-35 was transferred to SH 46. The remainder of Loop 3 was cancelled on November 5, 1971, and removed from the highway system.

== Loop 4 ==
State Highway Loop 4
- Location: Hays County
- Existed: September 26, 1939–May 27, 2004

Loop 4 was located in Hays County. It began at an intersection with the southbound frontage road of I-35 north of Kyle. The route traveled due north into Buda, where it became that city's Main Street. It had intersections with FM 2770 and RM 967 in the city. The route then traveled east before terminating at another junction with I-35.

Loop 4 was designated on September 26, 1939, as a renumbering of SH 2 Loop. The original route branched off US 81 north of Kyle and traveled northwest into Buda. The loop rejoined US 81 north of the city center. When I-35 was constructed, Loop 4 connected with the freeway at exits 217 (south of Buda) and 221 (north of Buda). Loop 4 was removed from the state highway system on May 27, 2004. The portion from I-35 exit 217 to downtown Buda was redesignated as an extension of RM 967, while the segment from the intersection of RM 967 to the former northern terminus at exit 221 was transferred to the city of Buda's jurisdiction.

== Loop 5 ==
State Highway Loop 5
- Location: Hays County
- Existed: September 26, 1939–September 23, 1950

Loop 5 was located in Kyle.

Loop 5 was designated on September 26, 1939, as a loop off US 81 through Kyle as a renumbering of SH 2 Loop. On September 23, 1950, Loop 5 was cancelled; much of the route was removed except a 0.11-mile (0.18 km) section along Center Street that was redesignated as Spur 5 (now RM 150).

== Loop 6 ==
State Highway Loop 6
- Location: Childress County
- Existed: September 26, 1939–October 5, 1972

Loop 6 was located in Kirkland.

Loop 6 was designated on September 26, 1939, as a loop off US 370 (now US 287) through Kirkland as a renumbering of SH 5 Loop. On October 5, 1972, Loop 6 was cancelled and removed from the highway system due to a lack of traffic and completion of an extension of FM 1033 from Loop 6 to US 287.

== Loop 7 ==
State Highway Loop 7
- Location: Henderson County
- Length: 16.6 mi (26.7 km)
- Existed: January 28, 2005–present

Loop 7 encircles Athens.

=== Loop 7 (1939) ===
State Highway Loop 7
- Location: Jasper County
- Existed: September 26, 1939–January 26, 1965

A previous route numbered Loop 7 was designated on September 26, 1939, as a loop off US 59 (now US 96) through Jasper as a renumbering of SH 8 Spur. On June 12, 1945, the road was reassigned to old US 96 while the former route of Loop 7 became a portion of US 96. This Loop 7 was cancelled on January 26, 1965.

== Beltway 8 ==
State Highway Beltway 8
- Location: Harris County
- Length: 83.128 mi (133.782 km)
- Existed: May 7, 1969–present

Beltway 8, the Sam Houston Parkway, along with the Sam Houston Tollway, is the middle highway loop around Houston.

=== Loop 8 (1939–1944) ===
State Highway Loop 8
- Location: Jefferson County
- Existed: September 26, 1939–January 18, 1944

A previous route numbered Loop 8 was designated in Beaumont on September 26, 1939, running from US 59 (now US 96) to US 90, as a renumbering of SH 8 Loop. Loop 8 was cancelled on January 18, 1944.

== Loop 9 ==
State Highway Loop 9
- Location: Dallas and Ellis counties
- Length: 9.94 mi (16.00 km)
- Existed: June 29, 2017–present

Loop 9 is mostly located in southern Dallas County, with a small portion running through northern Ellis County. The route is planned to be part of a much larger beltway that will encircle the entire Dallas–Fort Worth metroplex.

Loop 9 was designated on June 29, 2017, from I-35E near Red Oak to I-45 near Ferris.

=== Loop 9 (1969) ===
State Highway Loop 9
- Location: Dallas County
- Existed: May 6, 1969–October 21, 1977

Loop 9 formerly encircled Dallas.

Loop 9 was designated on May 6, 1969, from then-proposed I-20 back to I-20 at or near Spur 408. On October 21, 1977, Loop 9 was cancelled and removed from the highway system.

== Loop 10 ==
State Highway Loop 10
- Location: Tarrant County
- Existed: September 26, 1939–April 25, 1960

Loop 10 was located in Grapevine.

Loop 10 was designated on September 26, 1939, from SH 114 via Dallas Road to SH 121 as a renumbering of SH 114 Loop or SH 121 Loop. On April 25, 1960, Loop 10 was cancelled and removed from the highway system in exchange for creation of Spur 103.

== Loop 11 ==
State Highway Loop 11
- Location: Wichita County
- Length: 3.683 mi (5.927 km)
- Existed: September 26, 1939–present

Loop 11 (Loop 11), also known locally as Beverly Loop, is located in northwestern Wichita Falls.

Loop 11 begins at an intersection with Bus. US 277 (Bus. US 277, Seymour Highway), about three miles (4.8 km) west of downtown. The road continues south of here as Beverly Drive. After about 1/4 mile (0.40 km), the highway crosses the Wichita River. The highway turns sharp to the northwest at Southwest Drive before intersecting Farm to Market Road 367 (FM 367). After the intersection with FM 367, Loop 11 passes the Region 9 Education Center. Loop 11 continues to the north, junctioning with Industrial Drive and Bus. US 287, crossing over a railway line. Near Maurine Street, the highway curves to the northeast, before turning back in a more north direction. Loop 11 has a junction with US 287, a few miles southwest of Sheppard Air Force Base/Wichita Falls Municipal Airport. The highway passes near a retail center and turns east at Airport Drive before ending at I-44/US 277/US 281, with the road continuing east as FM 890.

Loop 11 was designated in 1939, running from US 287 west of Wichita Falls southward along Beverly Drive to US 277 (10th Street). The highway was extended northward in 1968 when US 287 was relocated to the Northwest Freeway. In 2002, Loop 11 was extended northward and eastward to I‑44.

Junction list

The entire highway is in Wichita Falls, Wichita County.

mi	km	Destinations	Notes
0.0	0.0	Bus. US 277 (Seymour Highway)	
0.8	1.3	FM 367 west (Valley View Road)	
1.5	2.4	Industrial Drive	Interchange
2.0	3.2	Bus. US 287 (Old Iowa Park Road) – Iowa Park	Interchange
2.9	4.7	US 287 (Northwest Freeway)	
3.7	6.0	I-44 (Central Freeway / US 277 / US 281) / FM 890 east – Regional Airport	I-44 exit 3C; continues eastward as FM 890
1.000 mi = 1.609 km; 1.000 km = 0.621 mi

== Loop 12 ==
State Highway Loop 12
- Location: Dallas County
- Length: 47.742 mi (76.833 km)
- Existed: September 26, 1939–present

Loop 12 encircles Dallas.

Loop 12 was designated on September 26, 1939, from US 175 north along Buckner Boulevard across US 80 to Buckner Orphans Home, and across US 67 to SH 114 near White Rock Lake as a renumbering of SH 40 Bypass. On June 23, 1942, the road was extended south to US 75. On August 3, 1943, the road was extended west to Ledbetter Drive and Cockrell Hill Road and north across US 80 to SH 183 near the approach to the Trinity River Bridge. Two months later the road was extended over SH 183 to US 77 at a traffic circle and east over then-SH 114 back to Loop 12, completing the loop around Dallas. On January 7, 1971, the road was rerouted over Spur 348 and a former section of SH 114; the former route of Loop 12 became Spur 482.

== Loop 13 ==
State Highway Loop 13
- Location: Bexar County
- Length: 21.684 mi (34.897 km)
- Existed: January 18, 1937–present

Loop 13 is located in San Antonio. Running along Military Drive and W.W. White Road, it served as the primary loop of San Antonio prior to the construction of I-410.

== Loop 14 ==
State Highway Loop 14
- Location: Bowie County
- Length: 2.225 mi (3.581 km)
- Existed: September 26, 1939–present

Loop 14 is located in Texarkana. The southern terminus of Loop 14 is at US 82; from here, US 82 westbound runs along New Boston Road, while eastbound US 82 continues along Texas Boulevard. Loop 14 runs north along Texas Boulevard before curving to the east. The northern terminus is at US 71 (State Line Avenue) at the Arkansas state line. The roadway continues into Texarkana, Arkansas as Arkansas Boulevard.

Loop 14 was designated on September 26, 1939, along the current route, as a renumbering of SH 47 Bypass. It is also the former routing of US 59 through Texarkana.

== Loop 15 ==
State Highway Loop 15
- Location: Mills County
- Length: 0.546 mi (879 m)
- Existed: September 26, 1939–present

Loop 15 is located in Goldthwaite. It runs from US 183 to US 84.

Previously Loop 15 was designated on September 26, 1939, from SH 284 (now US 183) near the Mills County Courthouse east to US 84 as a renumbering of SH 74A Business and SH 81 Business. The Loop 15 designation was subsequently relocated and used for the short stretch of less than 1 mile from the courthouse square in the city of Goldthwaite to the intersection of US 84 in Mills County.

== Loop 16 ==
State Highway Loop 16
- Location: El Paso County
- Existed: September 26, 1939–June 26, 1974

Loop 16 was located in El Paso.

Loop 16 was designated on September 26, 1939, from US 62 south along Wilmar Drive and Chelsea Drive to US 80 (now I-10) as a renumbering of SH 1 Loop. Two months later the road was rerouted on a new route to US 80 after it was found that securing the right-of-way for the original route was too expensive. On July 31, 1964, the road was extended to I-10, replacing a section of US 80 Alt. and all of Spur 1. Loop 16 was cancelled on June 26, 1974, and replaced by rerouted US 62 and US 85.

== Loop 17 ==
State Highway Loop 17
- Location: Karnes County
- Existed: September 26, 1939–June 21, 1990

Loop 17 was located in Karnes City.

Loop 17 was designated on September 26, 1939, from SH 123 north of Karnes City to old US 181 (now FM 1144) in Karnes City as a renumbering of SH 123 Loop. On June 21, 1990, Loop 17 was cancelled and transferred to Bus. SH 123.

== Loop 19 ==
State Highway Loop 19
- Location: Montague County
- Length: 0.883 mi (1,421 m)
- Existed: September 26, 1939–present

Loop 19 is located in Ringgold.

Loop 19 was designated on September 26, 1939, from US 82 in Ringgold via Main Street and Sixth Street to US 81 as a replacement of SH 2 Loop.

== Loop 20 ==
State Highway Loop 20
- Location: Webb County
- Length: 14.869 mi (23.929 km)
- Existed: September 26, 1939–present

Loop 20, also known as the Bob Bullock Loop and Cuatro Vientos Road, is a highway loop that runs to the north and east of the city of Laredo, Texas. Loop 20 extends from the World Trade International Bridge at its northern point to Mangana-Hein Road at its southern point. The current route varies in construction from a 2-lane road (at its southernmost end) to a freeway with frontage roads (near the World Trade Bridge).

== Loop 21 ==
State Highway Loop 21
- Location: Dickens County
- Length: 1.311 mi (2.110 km)
- Existed: May 19, 1942–present

Loop 21 is located in Spur.

Loop 21 was designated on May 19, 1942, from SH 70 east of Spur along Sixth Street and Burlington Avenue to SH 70 as a redesignation and extension of Spur 21.

== Loop 23 ==
State Highway Loop 23
- Location: Falls County
- Existed: November 30, 1978–June 21, 1990

Loop 23 was located in Marlin.

Loop 23 was designated on November 30, 1978, as a loop off SH 6 in Marlin as a replacement of SH 6 after it was rerouted to bypass the town. On June 21, 1990, Loop 23 was cancelled and transferred to Bus. SH 6.

== Loop 25 ==
State Highway Loop 25
- Location: Val Verde County
- Length: 1.335 mi (2.148 km)
- Existed: October 24, 1939–present

Loop 25 is located in Langtry.

Loop 25 was designated on October 24, 1939, from US 90 through Langtry to US 90 as a redesignation and extension of Spur 25.

== Loop 34 ==
State Highway Loop 34
- Location: Nacogdoches County
- Length: 1.497 mi (2.409 km)
- Existed: September 26, 1939–present

Loop 34 is located in Chireno.

Loop 34 was designated on September 26, 1939, from SH 21 through Chireno to SH 21 as a replacement of SH 21 Loop.

== Loop 36 ==
State Highway Loop 36
- Location: Angelina County
- Length: 1.171 mi (1.885 km)
- Existed: October 24, 1939–present

Loop 36 is located in Keltys.

Loop 36 was designated on September 26, 1939, from US 69 through Keltys to US 69 as a replacement of SH 40 Loop.

== Loop 37 ==
State Highway Loop 37
- Location: Red River County
- Existed: September 26, 1939–June 21, 1990

Loop 37 was located in Avery.

Loop 37 was designated on September 26, 1939, as a loop off US 82 in Avery as a renumbering of SH 5 Loop. On June 21, 1990, Loop 37 was cancelled and transferred to Bus. US 82.

== Loop 38 ==
State Highway Loop 38
- Location: Red River County
- Existed: September 26, 1939–June 21, 1990

Loop 38 was located in Bogata.

Loop 38 was designated on September 26, 1939, as a loop off US 271 in Bogata as a renumbering of SH 49 Bypass. On August 25, 1952, a 0.5 mile spur connection to SH 37 was added as Spur 38. Loop 38 was cancelled on June 21, 1990, and transferred to Bus. US 271.

== Loop 39 ==
State Highway Loop 39
- Location: Taylor County
- Existed: October 30, 1958–June 21, 1990

Loop 39 was located in Merkel.

Loop 39 was designated on October 30, 1958, as a loop off U.S. Route 80 (now I-20) in Merkel as a replacement for US 80 after it was rerouted. On June 21, 1990, Loop 39 was cancelled and transferred to Business I-20-P.

== Loop 40 ==
State Highway Loop 40
- Location: Midland County
- Length: 1.508 mi (2.427 km)
- Existed: May 29, 1991–present

Loop 40 is located northwest of Midland.

Loop 40 was designated on May 29, 1991, from FM 1788 northwest of Midland east, north, and southwest to FM 1788 as a redesignation and extension of Spur 217.

== Loop 42 ==
State Highway Loop 42
- Location: Motley County
- Length: 1.431 mi (2.303 km)
- Existed: September 26, 1939–present

Loop 42 is located in Roaring Springs.

Loop 42 was designated on September 26, 1939, on from Second St and SH 70 north of to Poplar St and SH 70 southeast of Roaring Springs as a renumbering of SH 18 Spur.

== Loop 43 ==
State Highway Loop 43
- Location: Rusk County
- Length: 0.330 mi (531 m)
- Existed: September 26, 1939–present

Loop 43 is located in Tatum.

Loop 43 was designated on September 26, 1939, from SH 43 though Tatum to SH 43 as a renumbering of SH 43 Loop.

== Loop 44 ==
State Highway Loop 44
- Location: Hockley County
- Existed: September 25, 1939–January 26, 1993

Loop 44 was located in Levelland.

Loop 44 was designated on September 25, 1939, as a loop off SH 24 in Levelland as a renumbering of SH 24 Loop. On March 9, 1951, the route was modified to run from SH 290 (now SH 114) to SH 51 (now US 385). Loop 44 was cancelled by district request on January 26, 1993, and transferred to Bus. SH 114.

== Loop 46 ==
State Highway Loop 46
- Location: Garza County
- Length: 0.870 mi (1,400 m)
- Existed: September 26, 1939–present

Loop 46 is located in Post.

Loop 46 was designated on September 26, 1939, from US 380 though Post to US 84 as a renumbering of SH 7 Loop.

== Loop 47 ==
State Highway Loop 47
- Location: Clay County
- Length: 2.22 mi (3.57 km)
- Existed: May 21, 1979–present

Loop 47 is located in Jolly.

Loop 47 was designated on May 21, 1979, from US 82 west of Jolly to US 82 east of Jolly.

Junction list

The entire route is in Clay County.

Location	mi	km	Destinations	Notes
	0.0	0.0	US 82 / US 287	
Jolly	1.0	1.6	FM 2393	
	2.2	3.5	US 82 east / US 287 south	
1.000 mi = 1.609 km; 1.000 km = 0.621 mi

=== Loop 47 (1931) ===
State Highway Loop 47
- Location: Parmer County
- Existed: September 25, 1939–July 1, 1941

Loop 47 was located in Bovina.

Loop 47 was designated as a loop off US 60 in Bovina as a renumbering of SH 33 Loop. On July 1, 1941, Loop 47 was cancelled and transferred to Spur 122 (now FM 1731).

== Loop 48 ==
State Highway Loop 48
- Location: Randall County
- Existed: August 29, 1958–June 27, 2019

Loop 48 was located in Canyon.

Loop 48 was designated on August 29, 1958, from US 87 near Canyon east and south to SH 217, 1 mile (1.6 km) east of US 87. On June 27, 2019, Loop 48 was cancelled and returned to the city of Canyon because West Texas A&M University has expanded across the road, which is partially inside the university property, and West Texas A&M will make improvements to the road.

== Loop 49 ==
State Highway Loop 49
- Location: Smith County
- Length: 32.000 mi (51.499 km)
- Existed: September 27, 1985–present

Loop 49 (also called Toll 49) is a currently 32-mile (51 km) circular freeway that, along with I-20, will encircle the city of Tyler and serve other various communities in Northeast Texas upon its completion. Routing of the loop north of I-20 bypasses Lindale to the west and passes by the west and south sides of Tyler south of I-20.

== Loop 50 ==
State Highway Loop 50
- Location: Johnson County
- Existed: September 25, 1939–May 31, 1957

Loop 50 was located in Burleson.

Loop 50 was designated on September 25, 1939, as a loop off SH 174 in Burleson with a spur to US 81. On May 31, 1957, the road was cancelled, with the Ellison Street section becoming part of Spur 50 (which was later rerouted off this alignment entirely, and was later cancelled); the remainder is now Commerce Street.

== Loop 51 ==
State Highway Loop 51
- Location: Lavaca and DeWitt counties
- Existed: September 25, 1939–June 21, 1990

Loop 51 was located in Gonzales.

Loop 51 was designated on September 25, 1939, as a loop off US 77 in Yoakum as a renumbering of SH 72 Bypass. On June 21, 1990, Loop 51 was cancelled and transferred to Business Alternate US 77.

== Loop 57 ==
State Highway Loop 57
- Location: Montgomery County
- Existed: December 30, 1960–May 1, 1980

Loop 57 was located in Conroe.

Loop 57 was designated on December 30, 1960, as a redesignation of Spur 57 when the southern terminus was moved to US 75 (now SH 75), forming a loop off US 75. On May 1, 1980, a 0.3-mile (0.48 km) section was transferred to SH 105 and the route was changed back to Spur 57.

== Loop 60 ==
State Highway Loop 60
- Location: Henderson County
- Length: 1.12 mi (1.80 km)
- Existed: September 25, 1939–present

Loop 60 is a business loop of US 175 that serves the unincorporated community of LaRue in Henderson County. It begins at an intersection with US 175 west of LaRue. The highway travels in an eastern direction and intersects FM 607 near the center of town, then turns south at CR 4350. Loop 60 continues to travel southward before ending at another intersection with US 175 southeast of LaRue.

Loop 60 was designated on September 29, 1939, along its current route.

== Loop 61 ==
State Highway Loop 61
- Location: Henderson County
- Existed: September 25, 1939–June 21, 1990

Loop 61 was located in Eustace.

Loop 61 was designated on September 25, 1939, as a loop off US 175 in Eustace. On June 21, 1990, by district request, a 0.16-mile (0.26 km) section from US 175 to FM 316 was removed from the highway system (this section is now Wheeler Street) and the remaining 0.1 mile section from FM 316 to US 175 became an extension of FM 316.

== Loop 62 ==
State Highway Loop 62
- Location: Cherokee County
- Length: 1.974 mi (3.177 km)
- Existed: September 25, 1939–present

Loop 62 is located in Rusk.

Loop 62 was designated on September 25, 1939, from US 69 through Rusk to US 69.

== Loop 64 ==
State Highway Loop 64
- Location: Hays County
- Existed: August 28, 1958–June 26, 2003

Loop 64 was located in Dripping Springs. It was a former alignment of US 290.

== Loop 66 ==
State Highway Loop 66
- Location: Gregg County
- Existed: August 1, 1956–June 14, 1968

Loop 66 was located in Kilgore.

Loop 66 was designated on August 1, 1956, as a redesignation of Spur 66 when it was extended through Kilgore to SH 26. The route was signed as Bus. SH 26 rather than Loop 66. On June 14, 1968, Loop 66 was cancelled and removed from the highway system due to the completion of the rerouting of SH 42.

== Loop 67 ==
State Highway Loop 67
- Location: Dawson and Martin counties
- Existed: October 24, 1941–April 1, 1954

Loop 67 was located in Ackerly.

Loop 67 was designated on October 24, 1941, as a redesignation of Spur 67 when it was extended to US 87 east of Ackerly. On January 29, 1953, a 0.6-mile (0.97 km) section was transferred to FM 2002. The remainder of Loop 67 was cancelled on April 1, 1954, and transferred to FM 2212.

== Loop 68 ==
State Highway Loop 68
- Location: Jasper County
- Existed: September 25, 1939–April 1, 1954

Loop 68 was located in Buna.

Loop 68 was designated on September 25, 1939, as a loop off US 59 in Buna as a renumbering of SH 8 Loop. On January 18, 1955, the route was changed to Spur 68 and modified to run from US 96 to SH 62.

== Loop 70 ==
State Highway Loop 70
- Location: Aransas County
- Length: 2.021 mi (3.252 km)
- Existed: September 25, 1939–present

Loop 70 is located in Rockport.

Loop 70 was designated on September 25, 1939, as a loop off SH 35 in Rockport. Although Loop 70 was cancelled and transferred to Bus. SH 35 on June 21, 1990, it was restored on April 27, 1995, as a replacement of Bus. SH 35 after it was reassigned to a former routing of SH 35 when SH 35 was rerouted along FM 3036. On March 30, 2006, a section was removed and returned to Rockport and Loop 70 was rerouted on top of a section of FM 1069 to Bus. SH 35.

== Loop 71 ==
State Highway Loop 71
- Location: Goliad County
- Length: 0.637 mi (1,025 m)
- Existed: May 5, 1966–June 24, 2026

Loop 71 was designated on May 5, 1966, from US 183, to the grave site of James Fannin, and northward and westward through the La Bahia Mission area to US 183. Loop 71 was cancelled on June 24, 2026, and the road was given to the Texas Historical Commission.

== Loop 73 ==
State Highway Loop 73
- Location: San Patricio County
- Existed: September 17, 1980–June 21, 1990

Loop 73 was located in Sinton.

Loop 73 was designated on September 17, 1980, as a replacement for US 77 when it was rerouted north and west of Sinton. On June 21, 1990, Loop 73 was cancelled and transferred to Bus. US 77.

== Loop 75 ==
State Highway Loop 75
- Location: Floyd County
- Length: 0.727 mi (1,170 m)
- Existed: September 25, 1939–present

Loop 75 is located in Lockney.

Loop 75 was designated on September 25, 1939, from US 70 through Lockney to US 70 as a renumbering of SH 28 Loop and SH 28 Spur. On June 22, 1944, a 0.4 mile spur connection to the Lockney business district was added (this became a portion FM 135 in 1951), but was signed as Loop 75. On January 20, 1964, the section along East 8th Street became a portion of FM 378.

== Loop 76 ==
State Highway Loop 76
- Location: Lynn County
- Length: 1.643 mi (2.644 km)
- Existed: September 25, 1939–present

Loop 76 is the old route of US 87 through O'Donnell, formed on September 26, 1939, as a renumbering of SH 9 Loop.

== Loop 77 ==
State Highway Loop 77
- Location: Swisher County
- Existed: September 25, 1939–September 24, 1963

Loop 77 was located in Tulia.

Loop 77 was designated on September 25, 1939, from 0.17 miles (0.27 km) north of the SH 86/Loop 9 intersection to the First Street/US 87 intersection. On August 6, 1951, the section along Maxwell Street was transferred to FM 146. The remainder of Loop 77 was cancelled on September 24, 1963, and transferred to FM 1318.

== Loop 79 ==
State Highway Loop 79
- Location: Val Verde County
- Existed: June 26, 2008–present

Loop 79 is located in Del Rio.

Loop 79 was designated on June 26, 2008, from US 277 via Del Rio to US 90. It serves as a bypass of Del Rio.

=== Loop 79 (1939) ===
State Highway Loop 79
- Location: Hutchinson County
- Existed: September 25, 1939–June 22, 1990

The original Loop 79 was designated on September 25, 1939, from SH 117 (now SH 136/SH 207) via Stinnett to SH 152 when SH 152 was rerouted off of this road. On June 22, 1990, Loop 79 was cancelled and transferred to Bus. SH 152.

== Loop 81 ==
State Highway Loop 81
- Location: San Patricio and Aransas counties
- Existed: October 24, 1939–June 21, 1990

Loop 81 was located in Aransas Pass.

Loop 81 was designated on October 24, 1939, as a loop off SH 35 in Aransas Pass as a replacement of SH 35 when it was rerouted. On June 21, 1990, Loop 81 was cancelled and transferred to Bus. SH 35 (now Loop 90).

== Loop 82 ==
State Highway Loop 82
- Location: Hays County
- Length: 3.06 mi (4.92 km)
- Existed: October 24, 1939–present

Loop 82 is located in San Marcos.

The southern terminus of Loop 82 is at Interstate 35 (I-35) exit 204A; the route travels along Guadalupe Street to the north of the exit, while Texas State Highway 123 begins in the other direction. At Grove Street, the route splits along a pair of one-way streets, with northbound traffic using LBJ Drive and southbound traffic using Guadalupe Street. Loop 82 crosses Texas State Highway 80 before the route turns to the east, with both directions using University Drive. The route passes San Marcos City Park and crosses the San Marcos River, then passes through the eastern part of the Texas State University campus as Aquarena Springs Drive. Loop 82 reaches its northern terminus at I-35 exit 206.

Loop 82 was designated on December 18, 1939, connecting with U.S. Route 81 at both ends. It followed Waller, Colorado, Austin, and Hopkins Streets, the last of which was (for a time) signed as Ranch to Market Road 12. After the decommissioning of US 81 south of Fort Worth, the designation was amended in 1992 to indicate the current endpoints at I-35.

Junction list

The entire route is in San Marcos, Hays County.

mi	km	Destinations	Notes
0.0	0.0	I-35 / SH 123 south – San Antonio, Austin	I-35 exit 204; roadway continues south as SH 123
1.1	1.8	SH 80 (Hopkins Street) – Wimberley	
2.0	3.2	Post Road	Interchange
3.1	5.0	I-35 / Aquarena Springs Drive – San Antonio	I-35 exit 206; roadway continues east as Aquarena Springs Drive
1.000 mi = 1.609 km; 1.000 km = 0.621 mi

== Loop 83 ==
State Highway Loop 83
- Location: Burleson County
- Length: 0.494 mi (795 m)
- Existed: December 18, 1939–present

Loop 83 is located in Caldwell.

Loop 83 was designated on December 18, 1939, from SH 21 through Caldwell via Main Street and Buck Street to a point on SH 36.

== Loop 84 ==
State Highway Loop 84
- Location: Hansford County
- Length: 0.704 mi (1,133 m)
- Existed: September 26, 1945–present

Loop 84 is located in Gruver. The 0.7-mile-long (1.1 km) route connects SH 15 and SH 136.

Loop 84 was designated on September 26, 1945, as a redesignation of Spur 84 when it was reassigned as a loop off FM 289 (now SH 15). On September 14, 1951, a 0.3-mile (0.5 km) section was transferred to FM 278 (now SH 136).

== Loop 87 ==
State Highway Loop 87
- Location: Zapata County
- Existed: December 8, 1939–December 1, 1953

Loop 87 was located in Zapata.

Loop 87 was designated on December 8, 1939, as a loop off US 83 in Zapata. On December 1, 1953, Loop 87 was eliminated from the highway system after US 83 was rerouted.

== Loop 88 ==
State Highway Loop 88
- Location: Lubbock County
- Existed: July 27, 2017–present

State Highway Loop 88 (Loop 88) is a state highway in Lubbock County, Texas, that will form a bypass around the city of Lubbock.

=== Loop 88 (1939) ===
State Highway Loop 88
- Location: Zapata County
- Existed: December 8, 1939–June 21, 1990

The original Loop 88 was designated on December 8, 1939, as a loop off US 83 in San Ygnacio. On June 21, 1990, Loop 88 was cancelled and transferred to Bus. US 83.

== Loop 90 ==
State Highway Loop 90
- Location: Aransas County
- Length: 1.387 mi (2.232 km)
- Existed: April 27, 1995–present

Loop 90 is located in Aransas Pass.

Loop 90 was designated on April 27, 1995, as a loop off Bus. SH 35 (former SH 35), replacing a different Bus. SH 35.

=== Loop 90 (1981) ===
State Highway Loop 90
- Location: Polk County
- Existed: June 23, 1981–June 21, 1990

The original Loop 90 was designated on June 23, 1981, as a loop off US 59 in Livingston as a replacement for US 59 when it was rerouted. On June 21, 1990, Loop 90 was cancelled on June 21, 1990, and transferred to Bus. US 59.

== Loop 93 ==
State Highway Loop 93
- Location: Grayson County
- Existed: June 8, 1984–October 25, 1990

Loop 93 was located in Sherman and Denison.

Loop 93 was designated on June 8, 1984, from US 75 northeast 6 miles (9.7 km) to SH 75A (now SH 91) and Spur 503 in Denison as a replacement of US 75 when it was rerouted. On October 25, 1990, and transferred to Bus. US 75 (now SH 91 and Spur 503).

== Loop 96 ==
State Highway Loop 96
- Location: Talco
- Length: 0.587 mi (945 m)
- Existed: April 30, 1959–present

Loop 96 is located in Talco.

Loop 96 was designated on April 30, 1959, from FM 71 via Sixth Street and Broad Street to US 271.

=== Loop 96 (1946) ===
State Highway Loop 96
- Location: Waller County
- Existed: October 15, 1946–January 16, 1953

Loop 96 was designated on October 15, 1946 (although officially designated as Spur 96) as a loop off Spur 96 through Prairie View A&M College. On July 9, 1951, the loop portion was officially designated as Loop 96. Loop 96 was cancelled on January 16, 1953, and redesignated as a loop connection of FM 1098, but FM 1098 was rerouted over the loop connection on September 29, 1976.

== Loop 98 ==
State Highway Loop 98
- Location: Kerr County
- Length: 3.400 mi (5.472 km)
- Existed: April 29, 2010–present

Loop 98 is located in Kerrville.

Loop 98 was designated on April 29, 2010, from FM 1338 south and southeast to SH 16 as a redesignation of Spur 98.
