= List of state highway spurs in Texas (300–399) =

- Texas State Highway Spur marker

Highway names
- Interstates: Interstate Highway X (IH-X, I-X)
- US Highways: U.S. Highway X (US X)
- State: State Highway X (SH X)
- Loops: Loop X
- Spurs: Spur X
- Farm or Ranch to Market Roads: Farm to Market Road X (FM X); Ranch-to-Market Road X (RM X)
- Park Roads: Park Road X (PR X)

System links
- Highways in Texas; Interstate; US; State; Former; Toll; Loops; Spurs; FM/RM; Park; Rec

State highway spurs in Texas are owned and maintained by the Texas Department of Transportation (TxDOT).

== Spur 300 ==
State Highway Spur 300
- Location: Nacogdoches County
- Length: 0.200 mi (322 m)
- Existed: October 28, 1993–present

Spur 300 is located in Nacogdoches.

Spur 300 was designated on October 28, 1993, from Old Lufkin Road south of Loop 224 eastward to US 59.

=== Spur 300 (1981) ===
State Highway Spur 300
- Location: Brazoria County
- Existed: December 14, 1981–September 26, 1986

The original Spur 300 was designated on December 14, 1981, from FM 521, 8.2 miles (13.2 km) north of Angleton, south 1.6 miles (2.6 km) to SH 288 along an old routing of SH 288. Spur 300 was cancelled on September 26, 1986, and transferred to SH 227 (now Bus. SH 288).

== Spur 302 ==
State Highway Spur 302
- Location: Hunt County
- Length: 3.888 mi (6.257 km)
- Existed: February 22, 2001–present

Spur 302 is located in Greenville. Its western terminus is at US 69 and US 380, and its eastern terminus is at I-30/US 67 at the east end. Mostly known as Lee Street, it runs through downtown as a one-way pair, with Lee Street going eastbound and Washington Street going westbound.

Spur 302 was designated on March 29, 1956, as Loop 302, connecting to US 67 at both termini, and signed as a business route of US 67. On December 14, 1960, the section along Wellington Street was cancelled, and the section east to SH 34 was also removed, as it was concurrent with SH 224. On June 21, 1990, Loop 302 was cancelled, and the designation was changed to Bus. US 67. On February 22, 2001, the route was redesignated Spur 302, which also replaced the section of SH 224 from SH 34 to US 69; the section of SH 224 that was concurrent with SH 34 was cancelled.

Junction list

The entire highway is in Plano, Tarrant County.

mi	km	Destinations	Notes
0.0	0.0	SH 114 (Joe Ramsey Boulevard) / US 380 (University Drive) – Denton, Mckinney	
1.8	2.9	SH 34 south / Bus. US 69 south (Stonewall Street) – Quinlan	
1.9	3.1	SH 34 north / Bus. US 69 north (Johnson Street) – Wolfe City	
3.6	5.8	FM 499 (Forester Street) – Campbell	
3.9	6.3	I-30 / US 67 – Rockwall, Sulphur Springs	I-30 exit 96
1.000 mi = 1.609 km; 1.000 km = 0.621 mi

== Spur 303 ==
State Highway Spur 303
- Location: Tarrant and Dallas counties
- Length: 17.357 mi (27.933 km)
- Existed: February 23, 1956–present

Spur 303 is located in Tarrant and Dallas counties. It runs from I-820 to Loop 12. At 17.4 miles, Spur 303 is the longest spur in Texas.

Spur 303 was designated on February 23, 1956, from Kiest Boulevard (now I-820), south of the Texas and Pacific Railway overpass at Handley, east along an old interurban rail line and along Park Row Street in Arlington to the then-proposed extension of SH 360. Three months later the road was extended east 3.9 miles (6.3 km) to FM 1382. On March 7, 1969, the road was extended east 5.4 miles (8.7 km) to Loop 12. On July 24, 1978, the section from SE 14th Street to the intersection of Florina Drive (now Mountain Creek Parkway) and Kiest Boulevard was continued into Grand Prairie .

== Spur 309 ==
State Highway Spur 309
- Location: Lubbock County
- Length: 1.018 mi (1.638 km)
- Existed: November 2, 1959–present

Spur 309 is located in western Lubbock. It begins at an intersection with SH 114, with Research Boulevard continuing south through Hurlwood. The highway runs north for approximately 1 mile (1.6 km) before ending at FM 2255, just south of Reese Center. Research Boulevard continues north before becoming a county dirt road.

Spur 309 was designated on November 2, 1959, from SH 116 (now SH 114), 9.5 miles (15.3 km) west of Lubbock, north to the entrance of Reese Air Force Base as a redesignation of War Highway 5. On June 30, 1961, a 0.114-mile (0.183 km) section at the northern terminus was returned to the base's jurisdiction.

=== Spur 309 (1956) ===
State Highway Spur 309
- Location: Milam County
- Existed: May 22, 1956–August 27, 1959

A previous route numbered Spur 309 was designated in Milam County on May 22, 1956, from US 77, 0.8 miles (1.3 km) north of Cameron, northwest to a county road. This route was cancelled on August 27, 1959, upon completion of construction, and jurisdiction was returned to the county per the original agreement.

== Spur 310 ==
State Highway Spur 310
- Location: Presidio County
- Length: 0.5 mi (800 m)
- Existed: June 18, 1996–February 27, 2003

Spur 310 (Erma Avenue) was located in Presidio County. It was designated on June 18, 1996, from then-new routing of US 67 north of Presidio to a point 0.5 miles (0.80 km) south along the old routing of US 67 to a point just north of Presidio Creek. Spur 310 was cancelled on February 27, 2003.

US 67 previously crossed Cibolo Creek on a former bridge along this section. While the former Spur 203 was designated for the former section of US 67 north of the bridge, Texas State Highway Spur 203 is the designation for the former section of US 67 (also Erma Avenue) south of the bridge (to U.S. Route 67 Business / Farm to Market Road 170).

== Spur 311 ==
State Highway Spur 311
- Location: Fannin County
- Length: 0.415 mi (668 m)
- Existed: February 25, 1975–present

Spur 311 was designated on February 25, 1975, from SH 121 in Bohnam northward on the old route of SH 121 to US 82.

== Spur 312 ==
State Highway Spur 312
- Location: Parker County
- Length: 5.105 mi (8.216 km)
- Existed: August 28, 1991–present

Spur 312 is located in Parker County, running from I-20 to US 180 in Weatherford. It was designated on August 28, 1991, as part of the cancellation of US 80 west of Dallas.

=== Spur 312 (1956) ===
State Highway Spur 312
- Location: Taylor County
- Existed: August 17, 1956–August 18, 1987

A previous route numbered Spur 312 was designated on August 17, 1956, from US 80 (now I-20) west of Abilene, south 0.8 miles (1.3 km) to Abilene Air Force Base (now Dyess Air Force Base). Spur 312 was cancelled on August 18, 1987, by district request and transferred to FM 3438.

== Spur 313 ==
State Highway Spur 313
- Location: Lubbock County
- Existed: November 20, 1997–January 26, 2006

Spur 313 was located in Lubbock County. It was designated on November 20, 1997, from FM 1730 west 4 miles (6.4 km) to US 62/US 82. Spur 313 was cancelled by district request on January 26, 2006, and returned to the cities of Lubbock and Wolfforth.

== Spur 314 ==
State Highway Spur 314
- Location: Hill County
- Existed: October 24, 1956–April 23, 1997

Spur 314 was designated on October 24, 1956, from SH 22 in Mertens southeast and southwest 0.2 miles (0.32 km) to FM 308 along an old routing of FM 308. A portion of the route was originally Spur 56 from 1939 to 1948. On April 23, 1997, Spur 314 was cancelled and returned to the city of Mertens.

== Spur 316 ==
State Highway Spur 316
- Location: Tarrant County
- Existed: December 17, 2009–present

Spur 316 is located in Grapevine.

Spur 316 was designated on December 17, 2009, from a part of FM 120, as the section north of SH 289 was transferred to SH 289, and FM 120 was rerouted over part of FM 996.

== Spur 317 ==
State Highway Spur 317
- Location: Val Verde County
- Length: 1.707 mi (2.747 km)
- Existed: March 29, 1957–present

Spur 317 is located in Del Rio. Spur 317 was designated on March 29, 1957, from US 277 southeast of Del Rio, northeastward to Laughlin Air Force Base. On June 26, 2008, the road was extended west to Loop 79, which was designated that day.

== Spur 320 ==
State Highway Spur 320
- Location: El Paso County
- Length: 9.3 mi (15.0 km)
- Existed: February 25, 2021–present

Spur 320 (Borderland Expressway) is located in El Paso.

Spur 320 was designated on February 25, 2021, from FM 3255 to Loop 375. The spur will be about approximately 9.3 miles upon completion.

Phase one (completed in February 2025) consists of a one-mile stretch of frontage roads from Railroad Drive to Dyer Street (Bus. US 54).

=== Junction list ===
The entire route is in El Paso County.

Location	mi	km	Destinations	Notes
	0.0	0.0	Loop 375 (Purple Heart Memorial Highway) – El Paso	Proposed southern terminus; future interchange
El Paso			Railroad Drive	Proposed interchange; temporary southern terminus of Spur 320
El Paso			Bus. US 54 (Dyer Street)	Proposed interchange; temporary northern terminus of Spur 320
El Paso			US 54 (Gateway Boulevard)	Proposed interchange
El Paso			FM 2529 (McCombs Street)	Proposed interchange
El Paso	9.3	15.0	FM 3255 (Martin Luther King Jr. Boulevard)	Proposed northern terminus
1.000 mi = 1.609 km; 1.000 km = 0.621 mi: Proposed

== Spur 324 ==
State Highway Spur 324
- Location: Anderson County
- Length: 2.240 mi (3.605 km)
- Existed: July 15, 1957–present

Spur 324 is located in Tennessee Colony.

Spur 324 was designated on July 15, 1957, from US 287 westward along the old location of US 287 to FM 645 in Tennessee Colony.

== Spur 325 ==
State Highway Spur 325
- Location: Wichita County
- Length: 1.706 mi (2.746 km)
- Existed: September 27, 1957–present

Spur 325 is located in Wichita Falls. It begins at an interchange with I-44/US 277/US 281 and US 287, about three miles (4.8 km) north of downtown. Southbound traffic on Spur 325 carries over to northbound US 287, and vice versa. It then has an interchange is with FM 890 (Airport Drive), with access to Wichita Falls Municipal Airport. The route's freeway status ends at Sheppard Access Road. Spur 325 ends at an intersection with SH 240. The roadway continues into Sheppard Air Force Base as Avenue D.

Spur 325 was designated on September 27, 1957, along the current route.

== Spur 326 ==
State Highway Spur 326
- Location: Lubbock County
- Length: 1.544 mi (2.485 km)
- Existed: October 30, 1957–present

Spur 326 is located in central Lubbock. It is known locally as Avenue Q. It begins at an intersection with US 84 (Clovis Road/Avenue Q) just northwest of downtown Lubbock. The highway then crosses over a railyard and has an interchange with Avenue P before crossing Comancheria Lake. Spur 326 intersects Erskine Street before ending at an interchange with I-27/US 87.

Spur 326 was designated on October 30, 1957, along the current route.

== Spur 327 ==
State Highway Spur 327
- Location: Lubbock County
- Length: 2.130 mi (3.428 km)
- Existed: October 30, 1957–present

Spur 327 is a short freeway located in the southwestern part of Lubbock, Texas. The highway connects U.S. Highway 62/U.S. Highway 82 (US 62/US 82, Marsha Sharp Freeway) to Loop 289.

== Spur 329 ==
State Highway Spur 329
- Location: Cameron County
- Existed: October 30, 1957–June 1, 1967

Spur 329 was designated on October 30, 1957, from US 83 at or near Harrison Avenue and an MP Railroad line in western Harlingen to US 77 at or near a then-present intersection of US 77 and Primera Road, east of the rail line. On June 1, 1967, Spur 329 was cancelled and redesignated as US 77.

== Spur 330 ==
State Highway Spur 330
- Location: Harris County
- Length: 5.805 mi (9.342 km)
- Existed: October 30, 1957–present

Spur 330 (also known as Decker Drive) is a freeway spur that connects Interstate 10 to SH 146 in Baytown, Texas, United States. The road also connects to Decker road at its terminus At SH-146 Saying "SPUR-330 EAST WEST". Its last exit is Rollingbrook rd (unsigned san jacinto Ave).

== Spur 331 ==
State Highway Spur 331
- Location: Lubbock County
- Length: 2.903 mi (4.672 km)
- Existed: October 30, 1957–present

Spur 331 is located in southeast Lubbock. It is 2.9 miles (4.7 km) in length. The route starts at US 84, travels northwest, has an interchange with Loop 289, and ends at FM 835. The entire route is known as Southeast Drive.

Spur 331 was designated on October 30, 1957, on its current route.

Junction list

The entire route is in Lubbock, Lubbock County.

mi	km	Destinations	Notes
0.000	0.000	US 84 (Slaton Road)	Interchange; southern terminus
0.300	0.483	FM 3020 east	
1.800	2.897	Loop 289	Interchange
2.903	4.672	FM 835 (50th Street) – Buffalo Springs Lake	Northern terminus
1.000 mi = 1.609 km; 1.000 km = 0.621 mi

== Spur 334 ==
State Highway Spur 334
- Location: Baylor County
- Length: 0.800 mi (1,287 m)
- Existed: August 24, 2006–present

Spur 334 is located in Seymour. It was designated on August 24, 2006, when US 183/US 277/US 283 was rerouted onto a freeway bypass south and east of Seymour.

== Spur 339 ==
State Highway Spur 339
- Location: Angelina County
- Length: 2.306 mi (3.711 km)
- Existed: August 23, 1960–present

Spur 339 is located in Lufkin.

Spur 339 was designated on August 23, 1960, from SH 103 in Lufkin via Raquet Street to SH 94.

== Spur 341 ==
State Highway Spur 341
- Location: Tarrant County
- Length: 1.932 mi (3.109 km)
- Existed: September 26, 1960–present

Spur 341 is located in eastern White Settlement. The highway runs for 1.932 miles (3.109 km) from an interchange with I-30/SH 183 to the corporate headquarters of Lockheed Martin at NAS Joint Reserve Base. The highway is known locally as Lockheed Boulevard. Spur 341 was designated on September 26, 1960, on its current route, replacing SH 550 Spur.

Junction list

The entire route is in Tarrant County.

Location	mi	km	Destinations	Notes
White Settlement	0.0	0.0	I-30 (West Freeway) / SH 183 (Alta Mere Drive)	Interchange; southbound exit and northbound entrance; I-30 exit 7A
White Settlement			Tacoma Drive	Interchange; southbound exit only
White Settlement			White Settlement Road	Interchange
Fort Worth	1.9	3.1	Lockheed Martin main entrance	
1.000 mi = 1.609 km; 1.000 km = 0.621 mi: Incomplete access

== Spur 342 ==
State Highway Spur 342
- Location: Galveston County
- Length: 1.683 mi (2.709 km)
- Existed: September 26, 1960–present

Spur 342 is a state highway spur route located completely within the city of Galveston, Texas. Officially named Butterowe Boulevard, but mostly known by locals as 61st Street, it stretches two miles (3.2 km) across Galveston Island.

== Spur 345 ==
State Highway Spur 345
- Location: Bexar County
- Existed: December 18, 2014–present

Spur 345 is a 5.1-mile-long (8.2 km) route in Greater San Antonio in the U.S. state of Texas, maintained by the Texas Department of Transportation (TxDOT). It follows a former route of U.S. Route 87 (US 87) through Balcones Heights and northwest San Antonio. Known locally as Fredericksburg Road, it is a major arterial for the cities of San Antonio and Balcones Heights, providing access to the headquarters of United Services Automobile Association (USAA) and to the South Texas Medical Center.

== Spur 346 ==
State Highway Spur 346
- Location: Calhoun County
- Existed: December 14, 1960–January 13, 1980

Spur 346 was designated on December 14, 1960, from US 87 in Port Lavaca to SH 35 near the west end of the Lavaca Bay Causeway along an old routing of SH 35. On January 13, 1980, Spur 346 was cancelled and transferred to SH 238.

== Spur 347 ==
State Highway Spur 347
- Location: Tarrant County
- Length: 0.894 mi (1,439 m)
- Existed: December 14, 1960–present

Spur 347 is located in Downtown Fort Worth. It travels along a pair of one-way streets, with eastbound traffic traveling along Weatherford Street and westbound traffic traveling along Belknap Street.

Spur 347 begins at an intersection with Grove Street near the Trinity Campus of Tarrant County College. The highway travels in a northeast direction and intersects Pecan Street before crossing the Rock Island Line. Spur 347 continues to run in a northeast direction before ending at an interchange with I-35W/US 287/US 377/SH 121.

Spur 347 was designated on December 14, 1960, between SH 199 and I-35W along an old route of US 377. The section of highway between SH 199 and Grove Street was removed from the state highway system and turned over to the city of Fort Worth on March 29, 2007.

== Spur 348 ==
State Highway Spur 348
- Location: Dallas County
- Length: 3.903 mi (6.281 km)
- Existed: February 22, 1961–present

Spur 348 is located in Dallas County. It runs from SH 114 northwest of Dallas to I-35E.

Spur 348 was designated on February 22, 1961, from Loop 12/SH 183 north to I-35E just north of then-SH 114. On January 7, 1971, the route was transferred to Loop 12 when it was rerouted (the former route of Loop 12 became Spur 482) and Spur 348 was reassigned the same day to an old routing of SH 114 from SH 114 to Loop 12. On December 27, 1990, by district request, the road was extended north 0.5 miles (0.80 km) to I-35E.

== Spur 349 ==
State Highway Spur 349
- Location: Val Verde County
- Length: 0.920 mi (1,481 m)
- Existed: April 19, 1961–present

Spur 349 is located in Val Verde County County. It runs from US 90 west to the Amistad Dam and the U.S.–Mexico border at the Lake Amistad Dam International Crossing.

Spur 349 was designated on April 19, 1961, on its current route. The route was temporarily decommissioned from 1962 to 1969 and relinquished to International Boundary and Water Commission jurisdiction while the Amistad Dam was under construction.

== Spur 350 ==
State Highway Spur 350
- Location: Tarrant County
- Existed: April 19, 1961–August 29, 1979

Spur 350 was designated on April 19, 1961, from then-proposed SH 121 to SH 183 west of Amon Carter Airport (now Greater Southwest International Airport). On August 29, 1979, Spur 350 was cancelled and replaced by a rerouted SH 183. The old route of SH 183 became SH 10.

== Spur 351 ==
State Highway Spur 351
- Location: Guadalupe County
- Existed: June 30, 1961–May 14, 1990

Spur 351 was designated on June 30, 1961, from FM 25 (now SH 46) and FM 78 south to US 90 Alt. west of Seguin. On August 4, 1970, the road was extended 3 miles (4.8 km) south to SH 123. On September 29, 1988, a 0.3-mile (0.48 km) section from I-10 to FM 78 was transferred to SH 46. The remainder of Spur 351 was cancelled on May 14, 1990, and transferred to SH 46.

== Spur 356 ==
State Highway Spur 356
- Location: Blanco County
- Length: 0.923 mi (1,485 m)
- Existed: March 29, 1962–present

Spur 356 is located in Blanco County. It runs from US 290 in Johnson City to US 281.

Spur 356 was designated on March 29, 1962, on the current route when US 281 was rerouted.

== Spur 357 ==
State Highway Spur 357
- Location: Knox County
- Length: 1.622 mi (2.610 km)
- Existed: July 26, 2007–present

Spur 357 is located in Knox County. It runs from US 277 in Goree to 1st Street.

Spur 357 was designated on July 26, 2007, on the current route when US 277 was rerouted.

== Spur 359 ==
State Highway Spur 359
- Location: Collin County
- Existed: June 26, 1962–August 25, 2016

Spur 359 was designated on June 26, 1962, in McKinney from then-new US 75 to then-US 75 (now SH 5). On August 25, 2016, Spur 359 was cancelled and returned to the city of McKinney.

== Spur 364 ==
State Highway Spur 364
- Location: Smith County
- Length: 4.018 mi (6.466 km)
- Existed: June 26, 1962–present

Spur 364 is a state highway spur in Smith County, Texas, United States. It is approximately 4.0 miles (6.4 km) in length.

== Spur 365 ==
State Highway Spur 365
- Location: Waller County
- Existed: June 26, 1962–May 5, 1964

Spur 365 was designated on June 26, 1962, near Brookshire (corrected to Hempstead three months later) from FM 359 and then-US 290 (now US 290 Business) north to then-proposed US 290 (now current US 290). On May 5, 1964, Spur 365 was cancelled and removed from the highway system as it was never built; the route became a portion of FM 359 in 1982.

== Spur 366 ==
State Highway Spur 366
- Location: Dallas County
- Length: 1.610 mi (2.591 km)
- Existed: June 26, 1962–present

Spur 366, also named Woodall Rodgers Freeway, is a highway that connects Beckley Avenue and Singleton Boulevard in West Dallas to Interstate 35E and U.S. Highway 75 (North Central Expressway) in central Dallas, Texas. The highway, as part of the downtown freeway loop, also serves as a dividing line between downtown Dallas on the south and the Uptown and Victory Park neighborhoods on the north.

== Spur 371 ==
State Highway Spur 371
- Location: Bexar County
- Length: 1.778 mi (2.861 km)
- Existed: September 25, 1962–present

Spur 371 is a 1.778-mile (2.861 km) limited-access spur route in the U.S. state of Texas in San Antonio. Spur 371 follows General Hudnell Drive from the former Kelly Air Force Base to U.S. Highway 90 (US 90) southwest of Downtown San Antonio. The highway provides access to the Kelly USA industrial park.

== Spur 376 ==
State Highway Spur 376
- Location: Williamson County
- Existed: March 26, 2020–present

Spur 376 was designated on March 26, 2020, from SH 195 and County Road 241 southeast to SH 195 along an old routing of SH 195.

== Spur 377 ==
State Highway Spur 377
- Location: Williamson County
- Existed: March 26, 2020–present

Spur 377 was designated on March 26, 2020, from SH 195 north of County Road 239 southeast to SH 195 along an old routing of SH 195.

== Spur 378 ==
State Highway Spur 378
- Location: Gregg County
- Existed: February 20, 1962–June 14, 1968

Spur 378 was designated on February 20, 1962, from US 259 in Kilgore west to SH 135 along an old routing of SH 135. On June 14, 1968, Spur 378 was cancelled and became a portion of SH 42.

== Spur 379 ==
=== Spur 379 (1963) ===
State Highway Spur 379
- Location: Johnson County
- Existed: February 20, 1963–October 25, 1990

The original Spur 379 was designated on February 20, 1963, from US 81 (now Business I-35) in Alvarado northeast to then-new US 67 along an old routing of US 67. Spur 379 was cancelled on October 25, 1990, and transferred to Bus. US 67.

=== Spur 379 (2013) ===
State Highway Spur 379
- Location: Williamson County
- Length: 1.400 mi (2.253 km)
- Existed: February 28, 2013–March 26, 2020

Spur 379 was designated on February 28, 2013, from I-35 north of Round Rock to US 79 as a replacement of a portion of Business I-35-L. On March 26, 2020, Spur 379 was returned to the city of Round Rock. However, signage will not be taken down for several months.

== Spur 380 ==
State Highway Spur 380
- Location: Jefferson County
- Length: 5.867 mi (9.442 km)
- Existed: September 26, 1960–present

Spur 380 is located in Jefferson County. It runs from I-10 to US 69/US 96/US 287 in Beaumont.

Spur 380 was designated on May 24, 1963, from US 90 in Beaumont, southeastward along old route of US 69/US 96/US 287 to the new route. On August 31, 1977, the road was extended northwest to I-10.

== Spur 381 ==
State Highway Spur 381
- Location: Grayson County
- Length: 0.337 mi (542 m)
- Existed: April 17, 1963–present

Spur 381 is located in Grayson County. It runs from US 75 to SH 5 in Howe.

Spur 381 was designated on April 17, 1963, on the current route.

== Spur 383 ==
State Highway Spur 383
- Location: Wichita County
- Existed: April 18, 1963–present

Spur 383 is located in Wichita County.

Spur 383 was designated on April 18, 1963, from then-relocated US 277 (now US 277/US 281/IH 44) west along an extension of Glendale Street to then-US 277 (now SH 240) in Burkburnett. On May 30, 2002, Spur 383 was to be cancelled by district request and removed due to a planned rerouting of SH 240, but the rerouting never happened, and the minute order was cancelled on June 20, 2025.

== Spur 386 ==
State Highway Spur 386
- Location: Cherokee County
- Existed: August 1, 1963–December 18, 2003

Spur 386 was designated on August 1, 1963, in Jacksonville, from Frankston Street north to then-new US 69 along an old routing of US 69. On December 18, 2003, Spur 386 was cancelled by district request and redesignated as FM 347.

== Spur 394 ==
State Highway Spur 394
- Location: Ellis County
- Length: 4.800 mi (7.725 km)
- Existed: December 19, 1963–present

Spur 394 is located in Ellis County. It is proposed to run from FM 66 southwest of Waxahachie, eastward to Bus. US 287.

Spur 394 was designated on December 19, 1963, from I-35E south of Waxahachie to US 287 northeast of Waxahachie. On August 23, 1976, the road was extended east from old US 287 (which was designated as Loop 528 that day) to new US 287. On June 21, 1990, the constructed section from Loop 528 to US 287 became part of Bus. US 287 (as well as Loop 528 itself), but it is signed as "TO US 287". On June 24, 1992, the road was extended west to FM 66.

== Spur 397 ==
State Highway Spur 397
- Location: Palo Pinto County
- Length: 0.822 mi (1,323 m)
- Existed: April 24, 1964–present

Spur 397 is located in Palo Pinto County. It runs from FM 4 in Graford east to SH 254. It is signed at both termini as Business Loop 397.

Spur 397 was designated on April 24, 1964, on its current route. It is a former routing of SH 254 through Graford.

== Spur 398 ==
State Highway Spur 398
- Location: Gray County
- Length: 1.514 mi (2.437 km)
- Existed: June 4, 1964–present

Spur 398 is located in Gray County. It begins at SH 273 south of Lefors and runs through the town to another point on SH 273 northeast of it.

Spur 398 was designated on June 4, 1964, from SH 273 near the south city limit of Lefors to another point on what was then SH 273 (now 2nd Street). On January 19, 1966, the road was extended north 1.5 miles (2.4 km) over the former SH 273.

== Spur 399 ==
State Highway Spur 399
- Location: Collin County
- Length: 1.100 mi (1.770 km)
- Existed: March 2, 1989–present

Spur 399 is a short, limited-access spur highway located in Collin County, Texas, and connects State Highway 121 (SH 121) and the US Highway 75 (US 75, Central Expressway) to SH 5, in McKinney. The highway is just over a mile long.

=== Spur 399 (1964) ===
State Highway Spur 399
- Location: Collin County
- Length: 1.300 mi (2.092 km)
- Existed: May 4, 1964–March 2, 1989

The original Spur 399 was designated from May 4, 1964, and it was from then-new US 75 to then US 75 (now SH 5) and SH 121 north of McKinney. Spur 399 was canceled on March 2, 1989, and was transferred to SH 121.
