= Texas State Highway 2 =

Former highway in Texas

State Highway 2

Route information
- Maintained by TxDOT
- Existed: April 4, 1917–September 26, 1939
- History: Eastern branch became SH 6 in 1923; Main route and western branch became US 81 in 1939

Location
- Country: United States
- State: Texas

Highway system
- Highways in Texas; Interstate; US; State; Former; Toll; Loops; Spurs; FM/RM; Park; Rec
← I-2	→ Loop 2

State Highway 2 (SH 2) was a Texas state highway.

SH 2 was one of the original twenty-five state highways proposed on April 4, 1917, overlaid on top of the Meridian Highway and Gulf Division Highway. From 1919 the routing mostly followed present day Interstate 44 (I-44) from Oklahoma to Wichita Falls, and U.S. Highway 287 (US 287) to Fort Worth. It continued on, routed along present day State Highway 174 and State Highway 6 to Waco. From here, the road divided into two branches, both signed as State Highway 2.

The western branch followed the Meridian Highway from Waco, roughly following I-35 to Temple, State Highway 95 to Taylor, U.S. Highway 79 to Round Rock, and I-35 through Austin and San Antonio, and terminating in Laredo.

The eastern branch followed the Gulf Division Highway from Waco, routed along present day State Highway 6 through Bryan to Hempstead and follows US 290 into Houston. From there the routing follows US 75 into Galveston. On August 21, 1923, the Gulf Division branch became part of State Highway 6 from Waco to Galveston. SH 2 was rerouted north of Bowie to Oklahoma along current US 81, replacing SH 2D, while the old route to Henrietta was renumbered State Highway 50, the sections from Henrietta to Wichita Falls were already part of State Highway 5, and the section north of Wichita Falls became an extension of State Highway 30. SH 2 was rerouted along current I-35W and I-35 through Hillsboro and concurrent with SH 6 to Waco, replacing SH 2A, with the section of the old route from Meridian to Waco being renumbered as part of SH 67, and the section from Cleburne to Meridian was renumbered as SH 89, and the section from Cleburne to Burleson became part of the new SH 2A. On December 17, 1923, SH 2 was rerouted along current I-35W from Temple to Round Rock, replacing SH 2C, while the old route through Taylor was redesignated as SH 2B.

In 1926, US 81 was routed over SH 2 from Oklahoma to Laredo. On March 19, 1928, SH 2 extended south replacing all of SH 12B to Pharr. On March 18, 1929, this extension was changed back to SH 12B. On September 22, 1936, routes called SH 2 Loop through Buda and Kyle were added. On December 22, 1936, routes called SH 2 Bypass through Waco and New Braunfels were added. On December 21, 1938, SH 2 Loop and SH 2 Tap were designated in Ringgold. While the routes were marked concurrently, on September 26, 1939, SH 2 was removed in favor of US 81. The loops, bypasses, and taps became Loop 2 (Waco), Loop 3 (New Braunfels), Loop 4 (Buda), Loop 5 (Kyle), and Loop 19 and Spur 19 (Ringgold).

== Spur routes ==
The route had numerous spurs and alternate routings during its lifetime.

Historic SH 2A

For the initial June 21, 1917 Texas routing proposal, while the main route continued southwest from Cleburne to Meridian, and then southeast to Waco, State Highway 2A ran southeast from Cleburne to Hillsboro, where it met State Highway 6. On April 23, 1918, the routing of SH 2A remained similar, except the split from the main route happened at Burleson, travelling southeast through Alvarado to Hillsboro. On August 21, 1923, the main route of SH 2 had been rerouted over SH 2A section from Burleson to Itasca, while SH 2A was reassigned to the old alignment of SH 2 from Burleson to Cleburne and to the old alignment of SH 2E to Hillsboro. The old route of SH 2 was renumbered as SH 89 (now SH 174) from Cleburne to Meridian and part of SH 67 (now SH 6) from Meridian to Waco. The SH 2A designation was deleted on September 26, 1939, and was replaced by portions of SH 174, SH 171, and SH 291 (now FM 2719).

Historic SH 2B

State Highway 2B was a spur designated on December 18, 1917, in McLennan County running from Riesel northeast to Mart along an already constructed section of what was previously proposed as part of SH 7. On March 20, 1922, SH 2B extended to the Limestone county line. On December 17, 1923, it was cancelled. SH 2B was designated that same day over a former routing of SH 2 from Round Rock east and north to Temple via Taylor. On June 8, 1925, the SH 2B from Riesel to the Limestone county line was restored, but this was redesignated to SH 2C around 1927. On April 6, 1932, it was transferred to SH 95 and SH 43 (now US 79).

Historic SH 2C

A more direct route through central Texas between Belton and Round Rock, bypassing Taylor to the west designated as an intercounty highway on January 24, 1918. On July 17, 1918, this was upgraded to a state highway, State Highway 2C, and extended north to Temple. On December 17, 1923, the main route of SH 2 had been rerouted over it. Around 1927, a new SH 2C from Riesel to the Limestone county line was designated. The road was redesignated as Texas State Highway 164 on September 17, 1930.

Historic SH 2D

State Highway 2D was a spur route in north Texas designated on December 16, 1918, branching off the main route at Bowie and travelling north through Ringgold and crossing into Oklahoma. On August 21, 1923, the main route of SH 2 had been rerouted over it, with the old route of SH 2 transferred to SH 50 (now US 287), SH 5 (now US 287), and SH 30 (now US 277).

Historic SH 2E

State Highway 2E was a short connector route between Cleburne and Itasca designated on March 22, 1921, connecting the main route and SH 2A. On August 21, 1923, SH 2E was reassigned to SH 2A.

Historic SH 2F

State Highway 2F was a planned spur routing designated in 1921 or 1922 splitting from the main route in Taylor and travelling south to Elgin. On August 21, 1923, the route was cancelled, and on April 21, 1924, the route was restored as SH 95. A new SH 2F was designated on March 18, 1929, from Bowie to Montague. On April 23, 1929, it was extended north to Nocona. On March 19, 1930, SH 2F was renumbered as SH 59.
