= Texas State Highway 25 =

State highway in Texas

State Highway 25

Route information
- Maintained by TxDOT
- Length: 59.953 mi (96.485 km)
- Existed: before 1939–present

Major junctions
- South end: US 281 / FM 174 at Windthorst
- US 82 / US 277 at Mankins; US 287 in Electra
- North end: River Road West near the Red River north of Electra

Location
- Country: United States
- State: Texas
- Counties: Archer, Wichita

Highway system
- Highways in Texas; Interstate; US; State; Former; Toll; Loops; Spurs; FM/RM; Park; Rec
← SH 24	→ SH 26

State Highway 25 (SH 25) is a state highway in north Texas, running from Windthorst north to the Red River near Haynesville.

== History ==
Historic SH 25

SH 25 was one of the original 25 Texas highway routes proposed on June 21, 1917. The original route was to be from Henrietta to Meridian. On August 21, 1923, all of SH 25 south of Mineral Wells was cancelled. On February 18, 1924, the section from Jacksboro to Henrietta was cancelled, and SH 25 had been rerouted to Archer City. On August 11, 1926, SH 25 extended north to Oklahoma. The route south of Jacksboro became a portion of SH 24 by 1929. On June 24, 1931, the route south of Windthorst became a portion of SH 66, changing it to its current route, with a toll bridge crossing across the Red River into Oklahoma. This crossing is no longer present.

== Branches ==
SH 25A was a branch designated on April 27, 1925 from Antelope via Henrietta to Oklahoma. On March 19, 1930, the route was renumbered as SH 148.

== Major intersections ==
County	Location	mi	km	Destinations	Notes
Archer	Windthorst	0.00	0.00	US 281 / FM 174 – Jacksboro, Wichita Falls	Southern terminus
Archer		3.75	6.04	FM 172 – Scotland	
Archer		8.78	14.13	FM 2581	
Archer	Archer City	11.19	18.01	SH 79 – Olney, Wichita Falls	
Archer		13.84	22.27	FM 210 – Megargel	
Archer		21.35	34.36	FM 368 – Lake Kickapoo, Holliday	
Archer	Mankins	28.58	46.00	US 82 / US 277 – Wichita Falls, Seymour	
Wichita		34.37	55.31	FM 1180 – Lake Diversion	
Wichita		34.72	55.88	SH 258 – Wichita Falls	
Wichita		37.47	60.30	FM 367	
Wichita		39.99	64.36	FM 2326	
Wichita	Electra	48.51	78.07	Bus. US 287	
Wichita	Electra	49.50	79.66	US 287 – Wichita Falls, Vernon	Interchange
Wichita	Haynesville	52.78	84.94	SH 240 – Harrold, Burkburnett	
Wichita		57.76	92.96	FM 370	
Wichita		59.95	96.48	River Road West (CR 126)	Northern terminus
1.000 mi = 1.609 km; 1.000 km = 0.621 mi
