= KSPS =

KSPS may refer to:

- KSPS-TV, a public television station (channel 7) licensed to Spokane, Washington, United States
- Wichita Falls Municipal Airport (ICAO code KSPS)
- Sheppard Air Force Base (ICAO code KSPS)
- Kelly Slater's Pro Surfer video game (abbreviated KSPS)
