= Allendale, Wichita County, Texas =

Ghost town in Texas, US

Allendale
- Ghost town
- Location in Texas
- Coordinates: 33°51′27″N 98°35′37″W
- Country: United States
- State: Texas
- County: Wichita
- Elevation: 1,020 ft (310 m)

Allendale is a ghost town in Wichita County, Texas, United States. Situated on Farm to Market Road 2650, it was established in 1889, by Elbert Allen and B. Dale Hinkle and A. D. Butcher, being named for the former two. A post office opened by 1872, being closed in 1895, the reopened in 1903, closing after 1930. Its school closed in the 1940s.
