= Interstate 44 in Texas =

Highway in Texas

Interstate 44
- I-44 highlighted in red

Route information
- Maintained by TxDOT
- Length: 15.398 mi (24.781 km)
- Existed: 1982–present
- NHS: Entire route

Major junctions
- West end: US 82 / US 277 / US 281 / US 287 in Wichita Falls
- US 287 in Wichita Falls
- East end: I-44 / US 277 / US 281 at the Oklahoma state line in Burkburnett

Location
- Country: United States
- State: Texas
- Counties: Wichita

Highway system
- Interstate Highway System; Main; Auxiliary; Suffixed; Business; Future; Highways in Texas; Interstate; US; State; Former; Toll; Loops; Spurs; FM/RM; Park; Rec
← SH 43	→ SH 44

Interstate 44 (I-44 (Note: Some sources use "IH-44", as "IH" is an abbreviation used by the Texas Department of Transportation for Interstate Highways.)) in the U.S. state of Texas is an Interstate Highway that has a 15.397-mile (24.779 km) stretch connecting Wichita Falls with Oklahoma. Its entire length runs concurrently with U.S. Highway 277 (US 277) and US 281. I-44 provides access to downtown Wichita Falls and Sheppard Air Force Base. I-44 is known as the Central Freeway in Wichita Falls and the Red River Expressway in Burkburnett.

== Route description ==
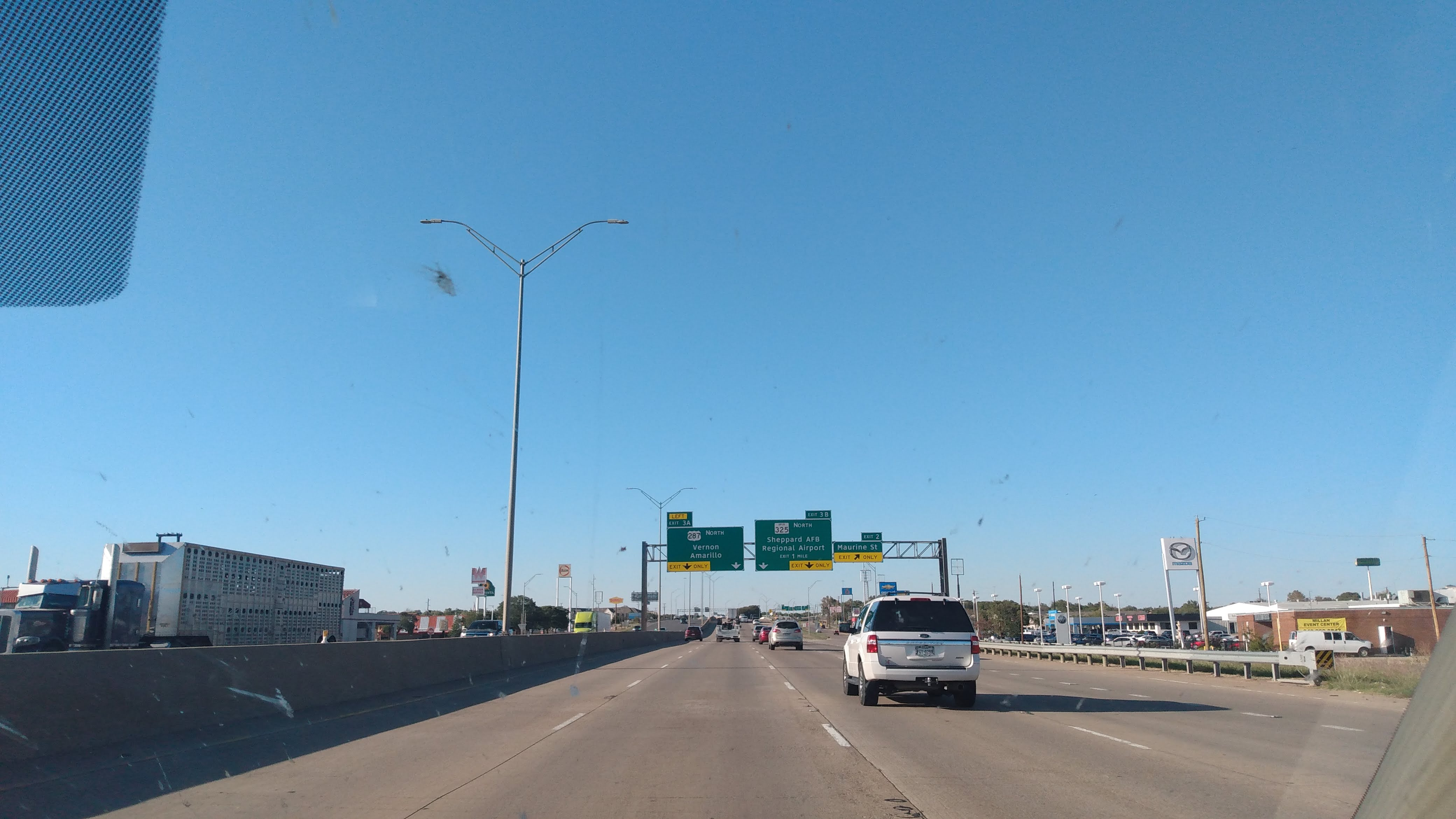
Northbound I-44 at exit 2 in Texas in 2023.

I-44 begins near exit 1 in Wichita Falls concurrent with US 277, US 281, and US 287. US 281 and US 287 continue to the south while US 277 leaves the concurrency at exit 1, which also provides access to US 82. I-44 heads north through Wichita Falls to an interchange with US 287 and Spur 325. US 287 leaves the concurrency as a freeway to the west while Spur 325 leaves the interchange toward the northeast, providing access to Sheppard Air Force Base and Wichita Falls Regional Airport. I-44 continues to the north as it leaves the Wichita Falls city limits at Bacon Switch Road. The freeway enters the Burkburnett city limits south of an interchange at Farm to Market Road 3429 (FM 3429). Heading north through the city, I-44 has an interchange with State Highway 240 (SH 240). After passing SH 240, I-44 begins to head toward the northeast before its final interchange in Texas at East 3rd Street. I-44 leaves the state of Texas at its crossing of the Red River and enters Oklahoma.

== History ==
I-44 was signed south from Oklahoma City past I-40, along the H. E. Bailey Turnpike, in 1982. This expanded the Interstate by some 100 miles (160 km) to Texas. This additional signage included the Red River Expressway in Burkburnett and the Central Freeway in Wichita Falls, to 8th Street (being concurrent with US 277/US 281/US 287). For many years, the freeway ended here, forcing traffic to exit onto the service roads. In the early 2000s, the Central Freeway was extended through the downtown area, connecting directly to the Central East Freeway via the Lloyd Ruby Overpass.

== Exit list ==
The entire route is in Wichita County.

Location	mi	km	Exit	Destinations	Notes
Wichita Falls	0.0	0.0		US 277 / US 281 / US 287 south to US 82 west – Jacksboro, Fort Worth, Lubbock, Abilene	Continuation beyond western terminus; west end of US 277/US 281/US 287 concurrency
Wichita Falls	0.2	0.32	1	Holliday Street – Business District	Westbound exit and eastbound entrance, access to United Regional Healthcare System
Wichita Falls	0.4	0.64	1A	Bus. US 277 south	Westbound exit and eastbound entrance
Wichita Falls	0.8	1.3	1B	Scotland Park	Eastbound exit and westbound entrance
Wichita Falls	1.3	2.1	1C	Texas Travel Info Center	
Wichita Falls	2.0	3.2	1D	Bus. US 287	
Wichita Falls	2.2	3.5	2	Maurine Street	
Wichita Falls	2.7	4.3	3A	US 287 north – Vernon, Amarillo	East end of US 287 concurrency
Wichita Falls	2.9	4.7	3B	Spur 325 – Sheppard AFB, Wichita Falls Municipal Airport	
Wichita Falls	3.5	5.6	3C	FM 890 – Wichita Falls Municipal Airport	
Wichita Falls	4.2	6.8	4	City Loop	No westbound entrance; exit not signed westbound
Wichita Falls	5.1	8.2	5	Access Road	Eastbound exit and westbound entrance
Wichita Falls	5.5	8.9	5A	FM 3492 (Missile Road) – Sheppard AFB	
Wichita Falls	6.7	10.8	6	Bacon Switch Road	
	7.8	12.6	7	East Road	
Burkburnett	10.9	17.5	11	FM 3429 (Daniels Road)	
Burkburnett	12.4	20.0	12	SH 240 – Burkburnett	
Burkburnett	13.4	21.6	13	Glendale Street	Former Spur 383
Burkburnett	14.1	22.7	14	To SH 240 west (East Third Street) – Burkburnett	Former Loop 267
	15.4	24.8		I-44 east / US 277 north / US 281 north (President George W. Bush Bridge) – Lawton, Oklahoma City	Continuation into Oklahoma
1.000 mi = 1.609 km; 1.000 km = 0.621 mi: Concurrency terminus; Incomplete access

== Notes ==
Interstate 44
Previous state: Terminus	Texas	Next state: Oklahoma
