= Haynesville, Texas =

Haynesville
- Unincorporated community
- Location within the state of Texas Haynesville (the United States)
- Coordinates: 34°5′29″N 98°54′57″W
- Country: United States
- State: Texas
- County: Wichita
- Elevation: 1,132 ft (345 m)

Population (2000)
  - Total: 60
- Time zone: UTC-6 (Central (CST))
  - Summer (DST): UTC-5 (CDT)

Haynesville (also known as Punkin Center) is an unincorporated community in Wichita County, Texas, United States. It has an estimated population of 60.

Haynesville is part of the Wichita Falls metropolitan area.

== History ==
The community was established in 1890 and originally named Punkin Center, but later renamed after Henry Haynes, a county commissioner and local farmer. During most of the 20th century, Haynesville's population ranged between roughly 60 and 100 residents.

== Geography ==
Haynesville is located at the intersection of State Highways 25 and 240, five miles north of Electra in northwestern Wichita County. The community's elevation is 1,132 ft above sea level.

== Education ==
The Electra Independent School District serves the community of Haynesville.
