= Texas State Highway 240 =

State highway in Texas

State Highway 240
- SH 240, highlighted in red

Route information
- Maintained by TxDOT
- Length: 43.250 mi (69.604 km)
- Existed: 1936–present

Major junctions
- West end: US 287 near Harrold
- I-44 / US 277 / US 281 in Burkburnett
- East end: Bus. US 287 in Wichita Falls

Location
- Country: United States
- State: Texas
- Counties: Wilbarger, Wichita

Highway system
- Highways in Texas; Interstate; US; State; Former; Toll; Loops; Spurs; FM/RM; Park; Rec
← SH 239	→ SH 241

State Highway 240 (SH 240) is a Texas state highway that runs from Harrold east to Burkburnett, then south parallel to Interstate 44 to Wichita Falls.

== Route description ==
SH 240 begins at an intersection with US 287 south of Harrold in eastern Wilbarger County. The route travels eastward and soon crosses into Wichita County, intersecting SH 25 in Haynesville. The highway enters the city of Burkburnett along 3rd Street before turning to the south and crossing the I-44 freeway. SH 240 then roughly parallels the freeway, and passes Sheppard AFB as it enters Wichita Falls city limits along Burkburnett Road. SH 240 parallels the Wichita, Tillman and Jackson Railway line as it travels through the city center before the route ends at Bus. US 287 on the east side of the city.

== History ==
SH 240 was originally designated on December 22, 1936, from US 70 (now US 287) at or near Harrold to Burkburnett. It was extended south to Wichita Falls on April 24, 1964, over the former route of US 277, US 281, Loop 165 and US 287 when the new route was opened. On June 21, 1990, a 3.6 mile section from Business US 287-J in Wichita Falls to US 287 and US 82 in Clay County was added to Business US 287-J. On May 30, 2002, SH 240 was to be rerouted north of Burkburnett over part of Loop 267 and along Interstate 44, but this never happened, and the minute order was repealed on June 20, 2025.

== Major intersections ==
County	Location	mi	km	Destinations	Notes
Wilbarger		0.0	0.0	US 287 – Wichita Falls, Childress	Western terminus
Wichita	Haynesville	6.2	10.0	SH 25 – Electra	
Wichita		13.7	22.0	FM 1739	
Wichita		18.9	30.4	FM 1813	
Wichita		22.7	36.5	FM 368 – Iowa Park	
Wichita	Burkburnett	24.8	39.9	FM 369	
Wichita	Burkburnett	26.2	42.2	Loop 267 south (Ave. D)	East end of Loop 267 concurrency
Wichita	Burkburnett	26.9	43.3	Loop 267 north (E. 3rd St.) to I-44	West end of Loop 267 concurrency
Wichita	Burkburnett	27.5	44.3	Spur 383	
Wichita	Burkburnett	28.3	45.5	Loop 267	
Wichita	Burkburnett	28.3	45.5	I-44 / US 277 / US 281 – Wichita Falls, Lawton	I-44 exit 12
Wichita		31.2	50.2	FM 1177	
Wichita	Wichita Falls	37.4	60.2	Spur 325	
Wichita	Wichita Falls	38.4	61.8	FM 890	
Wichita	Wichita Falls	40.1	64.5	FM 171 east (Jefferson St.)	East end of FM 171 concurrency
Wichita	Wichita Falls	40.3	64.9	FM 171 west (Lincoln St.)	West end of FM 171 concurrency
Wichita	Wichita Falls	41.3	66.5	Spur 447 to US 82	
Wichita	Wichita Falls	43.2	69.5	Bus. US 287 (Scott Ave.) – Henrietta	Eastern terminus
1.000 mi = 1.609 km; 1.000 km = 0.621 mi
