= Wichita County, Texas =

County in Texas, United States

- County
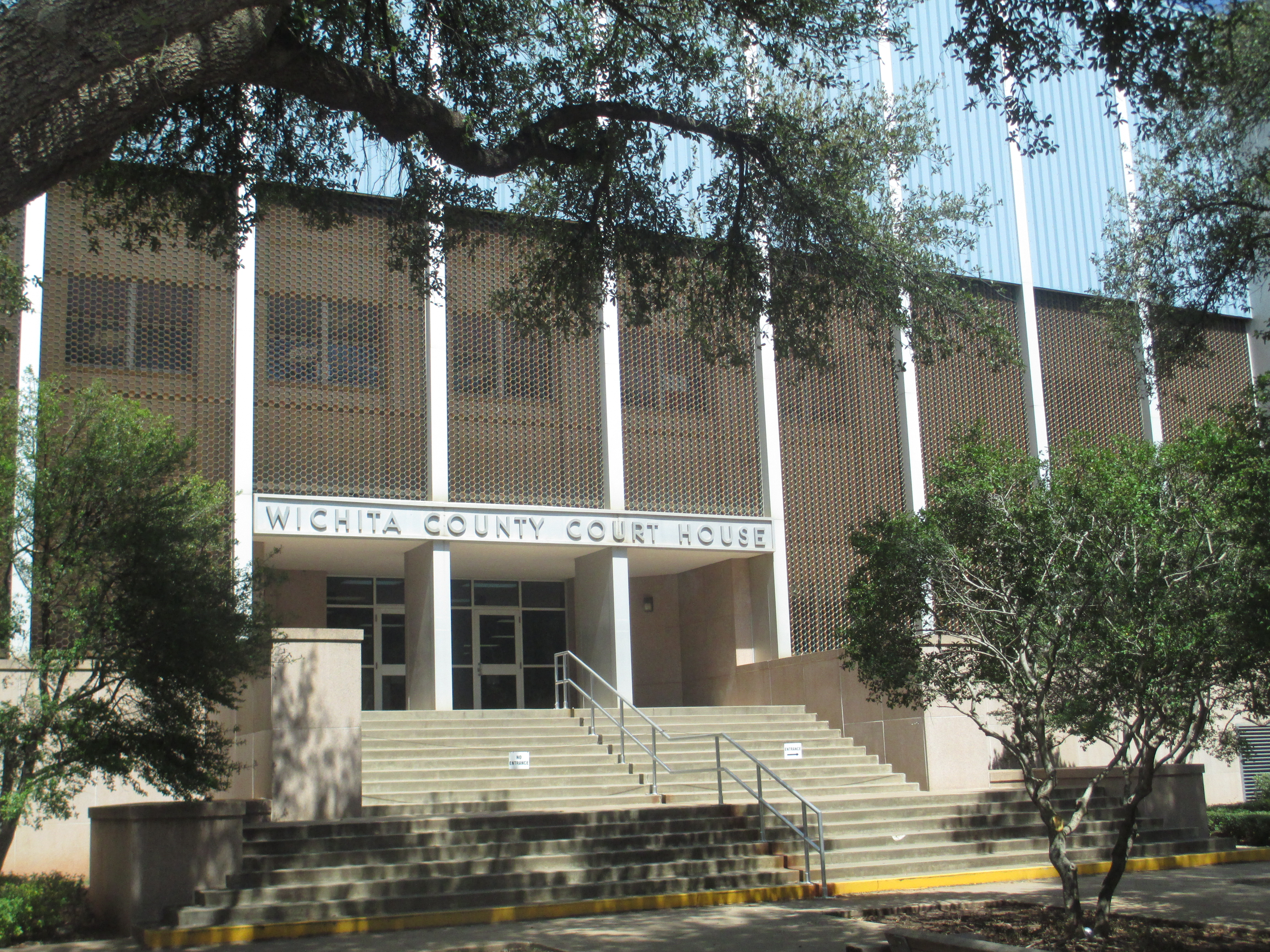
- The Wichita County Courthouse in downtown Wichita Falls

- Location within the U.S. state of Texas
- Coordinates: 33°59′N 98°43′W
- Country: United States
- State: Texas
- Founded: February 1, 1882
- Seat: Wichita Falls
- Largest city: Wichita Falls

Area
  - Total: 633 sq mi (1,640 km^{2})
  - Land: 628 sq mi (1,630 km^{2})
  - Water: 5.3 sq mi (14 km^{2}) 0.8%

Population (2020)
  - Total: 129,350
  - Estimate (2025): 129,555 ▲
  - Density: 206/sq mi (79.5/km^{2})
- Time zone: UTC−6 (Central)
  - Summer (DST): UTC−5 (CDT)
- Congressional district: 13th
- Website: wichitacountytx.com

Wichita County (/ˈwɪtʃɪtɔː/ WITCH-ih-taw) is a county located in the U.S. state of Texas. As of the 2020 census, its population was 129,350. The county seat is Wichita Falls. The county was created in 1858 and organized in 1882. Wichita County is part of the Wichita Falls, Texas, metropolitan statistical area.

== Geography ==
According to the United States Census Bureau, the county has a total area of 633 square miles (1,640 km^{2}), of which 5.3 square miles (14 km^{2}) (0.8%) are covered by water. The county is drained by the Wichita River and other streams.

=== Major highways ===
- Interstate 44
- U.S. Highway 82
- U.S. Highway 277
- U.S. Highway 281
- U.S. Highway 287
- State Highway 25
- State Highway 79
- State Highway 240
- State Highway 258
- Loop 11
- Loop 267
- Loop 473
- Spur 213
- Spur 325
- Spur 383
- Spur 447

=== Adjacent counties ===
- Tillman County, Oklahoma (north)
- Cotton County, Oklahoma (northeast)
- Clay County (east)
- Archer County (south)
- Wilbarger County (west)
- Baylor County (southwest)

== Geology ==
Wichita County is part of the Texas Red Beds, which are strata of red-colored sedimentary rock from the Early Permian. The fossils of Permian-period vertebrates in the Texas Red Beds were first discovered by Edward Drinker Cope in 1877. Subsequent research has revealed rare fossils of Permian-period amphibians, such as Trimerorhachis, as well as rich deposits of other Permian tetrapods, such as Dimetrodon and Diadectes.

== Demographics ==
Historical population
Census	Pop.	Note	%±
1880	433		—
1890	4,831		1,015.7%
1900	5,806		20.2%
1910	16,094		177.2%
1920	72,911		353.0%
1930	74,416		2.1%
1940	73,604		−1.1%
1950	98,493		33.8%
1960	123,528		25.4%
1970	120,563		−2.4%
1980	121,082		0.4%
1990	122,378		1.1%
2000	131,664		7.6%
2010	131,500		−0.1%
2020	129,350		−1.6%
2025 (est.)	129,555	▲	0.2%
U.S. Decennial Census; 1850–2010 2010-2020

=== Racial and ethnic composition ===
Wichita County, Texas – Racial and ethnic composition Note: the US Census treats Hispanic/Latino as an ethnic category. This table excludes Latinos from the racial categories and assigns them to a separate category. Hispanics/Latinos may be of any race.
Race / Ethnicity (NH = non-Hispanic)	Pop 1980	Pop 1990	Pop 2000	Pop 2010	Pop 2020	% 1980	% 1990	% 2000	% 2010	% 2020
White alone (NH)	100,300	98,127	96,490	90,001	79,694	82.84%	80.18%	73.29%	68.44%	61.61%
Black or African American alone (NH)	10,773	10,986	13,243	13,322	13,379	8.90%	8.98%	10.06%	10.13%	10.34%
Native American or Alaska Native alone (NH)	555	813	919	1,087	992	0.46%	0.66%	0.70%	0.83%	0.77%
Asian alone (NH)	1,312	1,778	2,386	2,586	2,647	1.08%	1.45%	1.81%	1.97%	2.05%
Native Hawaiian or Pacific Islander alone (NH)	x	x	99	85	140	x	x	0.08%	0.06%	0.11%
Other race alone (NH)	349	119	142	109	476	0.29%	0.10%	0.11%	0.08%	0.37%
Mixed race or Multiracial (NH)	x	x	2,288	2,451	6,219	x	x	1.74%	1.86%	4.81%
Hispanic or Latino (any race)	7,793	10,555	16,097	21,859	25,803	6.44%	8.62%	12.23%	16.62%	19.95%
Total	121,082	122,378	131,664	131,500	129,350	100.00%	100.00%	100.00%	100.00%	100.00%

=== 2020 census ===
As of the 2020 census, the county had a population of 129,350. The median age was 36.1 years; 22.2% of the residents were under 18 and 16.0% were 65 or older. The female/male ratio was 1:1.045 males overall and 1:1.046 for those 18 and over.

The racial makeup of the county was 67.0% White, 10.7% Black or African American, 1.1% American Indian and Alaska Native, 2.1% Asian, 0.1% Native Hawaiian and Pacific Islander, 8.1% from some other race, and 10.8% from two or more races. Hispanic or Latino residents of any race comprised 19.9% of the population.

About 87.3% of residents lived in urban areas, while 12.7% lived in rural areas.

Of the 49,007 households in the county, 30.3% had children under 18 living in them, 43.6% were married-couple households, 19.7% were households with a male householder and no spouse or partner present, and 29.9% were households with a female householder and no spouse or partner present. About 30.7% of all households were made up of individuals, and 12.1% had someone living alone who was 65 or older.

The county had 55,519 housing units, of which 11.7% were vacant. Among occupied housing units, 60.0% were owner-occupied and 40.0% were renter-occupied. The homeowner vacancy rate was 2.2% and the rental vacancy rate was 12.7%.

=== 2000 census ===
As of the 2000 census, 131,664 people, 48,441 households, and 32,891 families resided in the county. The population density was 210 people per square mile (81 people/km^{2}). The 53,304 housing units had an average density of 85 units per square mile (33 units/km^{2}). The racial makeup of the county was 78.76% White, 10.23% African American, 0.89% Native American, 1.84% Asian, 5.60% from other races, and 2.68% from two or more races. About 12.23% of the population were Hispanics or Latinos of any race.

Of the 48,441 households, 33.6% had children under 18 living with them, 52.3% were married couples living together, 11.9% had a female householder with no husband present, and 32.1% were not families, with 1,869 unmarried partner households - 1,677 heterosexual, 94 same-sex male, and 98 same-sex female. About 27.2% of all households were made up of individuals, and 10.6% had someone living alone who was 65 or older. The average household size was 2.49, and the average family size was 3.04.

In the county, the age distribution was 25.2% under 18, 13.7% from 18 to 24, 29.0% from 25 to 44, 19.5% from 45 to 64, and 12.7% who were 65 or older. The median age was 33 years. For every 100 females, there were 103.8 males. For every 100 females 18 and over, there were 103.4 males.

The median income in the county for a household was $33,780 and for a family was $40,937. Males had a median income of $28,687 versus $21,885 for females. The per capita income for the county was $16,965. About 10.3% of families and 13.2% of the population were below the poverty line, including 17.4% of those under 18 and 9.8% of those 65 or over.

== Government and infrastructure ==
The Texas Department of Criminal Justice James V. Allred Unit is located in Wichita County. Wichita County Commissioner Court members: County Judge Jim Johnson Commissioner Pct. 1 Mark Beauchamp Commissioner Pct. 2 Mickey Fincannon Commissioner Pct. 3 Barry Mahler Commissioner Pct. 4 Jeff Watts

The sheriff of Wichita County is David Duke. He first took office on January 1, 2009.

== Politics ==
Wichita County is represented in the Texas House of Representatives by Republican James Frank, a businessman from Wichita Falls. Wichita County has about 77% of the population of Texas' 69th state house district, 18% of the population of the 13th US congressional district, and 15% of the population of the 30th state senate district.

Wichita County is located within District 69 of the Texas House of Representatives. Wichita County contains parts of District 28 and parts of District 30 for representation in the Texas Senate.

=== Presidential elections ===
Wichita County has consistently voted for the Republican Party in presidential elections since 1980.

In 2008, Wichita County cast the majority of its votes for Republican John McCain; he won 31,673 votes (69%). Democrat Barack Obama received 13,828 votes (30%). Other candidates received 1% of the vote. In 2004, Republican George W. Bush did better than John McCain and won 71% of the vote and 32,472 votes. Democrat John F. Kerry won 28% of the vote and 12,819 votes.

United States presidential election results for Wichita County, Texas
Year	Republican		Democratic		Third party(ies)	
Year	No.	%	No.	%	No.	%
1912	108	7.35%	1,124	76.51%	237	16.13%
1916	347	13.47%	2,108	81.80%	122	4.73%
1920	1,487	27.49%	3,812	70.46%	111	2.05%
1924	2,189	25.81%	5,831	68.75%	461	5.44%
1928	7,226	59.82%	4,853	40.18%	0	0.00%
1932	1,479	14.20%	8,889	85.36%	45	0.43%
1936	1,327	12.30%	9,428	87.39%	33	0.31%
1940	2,206	15.89%	11,672	84.05%	9	0.06%
1944	1,597	10.93%	11,392	77.94%	1,627	11.13%
1948	2,887	18.20%	12,235	77.11%	744	4.69%
1952	12,197	47.40%	13,505	52.49%	29	0.11%
1956	12,181	48.83%	12,726	51.01%	41	0.16%
1960	12,587	46.25%	14,587	53.60%	39	0.14%
1964	8,585	30.96%	19,131	68.99%	14	0.05%
1968	11,937	35.72%	15,387	46.05%	6,090	18.23%
1972	25,197	68.69%	10,948	29.85%	537	1.46%
1976	19,024	46.10%	22,017	53.35%	225	0.55%
1980	22,884	54.98%	17,657	42.42%	1,084	2.60%
1984	28,932	64.18%	16,009	35.51%	139	0.31%
1988	23,324	56.08%	17,956	43.17%	310	0.75%
1992	17,956	38.53%	17,021	36.52%	11,631	24.95%
1996	20,495	51.30%	15,775	39.49%	3,680	9.21%
2000	27,802	65.09%	14,108	33.03%	803	1.88%
2004	32,472	71.30%	12,819	28.15%	254	0.56%
2008	31,731	69.01%	13,868	30.16%	383	0.83%
2012	29,812	72.68%	10,525	25.66%	681	1.66%
2016	27,631	72.49%	8,770	23.01%	1,718	4.51%
2020	32,069	69.65%	13,161	28.59%	810	1.76%
2024	31,818	71.45%	12,237	27.48%	475	1.07%

United States Senate election results for Wichita County, Texas1
Year	Republican		Democratic		Third party(ies)	
Year	No.	%	No.	%	No.	%
2024	30,711	69.39%	12,545	28.35%	1,001	2.26%

United States Senate election results for Wichita County, Texas2
Year	Republican		Democratic		Third party(ies)	
Year	No.	%	No.	%	No.	%
2020	31,626	69.84%	12,399	27.38%	1,256	2.77%

Texas Gubernatorial election results for Wichita County
Year	Republican		Democratic		Third party(ies)	
Year	No.	%	No.	%	No.	%
2022	23,328	73.75%	7,824	24.74%	479	1.51%

== Communities ==
=== Cities ===
- Cashion Community
- Burkburnett
- Electra
- Iowa Park
- Wichita Falls (county seat)

=== Town ===
- Pleasant Valley

=== Unincorporated communities ===
- Haynesville
- Kamay
- Valley View

== Education ==
School districts serving the county include:

- Burkburnett Independent School District
- City View Independent School District
- Electra Independent School District
- Holliday Independent School District
- Iowa Park Consolidated Independent School District
- Wichita Falls Independent School District

The county is in the service area of Vernon College.

== See also ==
- List of museums in North Texas
- National Register of Historic Places listings in Wichita County, Texas
- Recorded Texas Historic Landmarks in Wichita County
- The Kell House
