= Wichita Falls Regional Airport =

Wichita Falls Regional Airport Sheppard Air Force Base
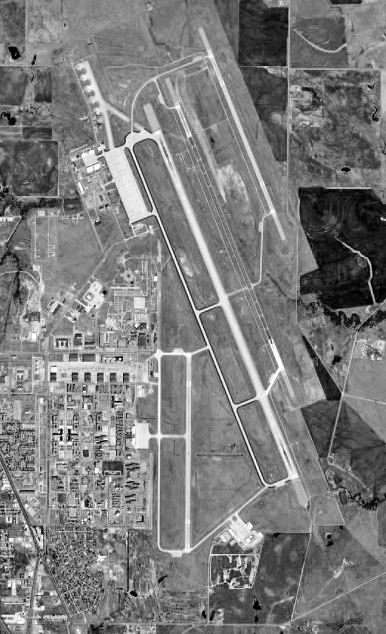
- USGS 1996 orthophoto
- IATA: SPS; ICAO: KSPS; FAA LID: SPS

Summary
- Airport type: Public / Military
- Owner: U.S. Air Force
- Operator: City of Wichita Falls
- Location: Wichita Falls, Texas
- Opened: July 4, 1928; 98 years ago
- Elevation AMSL: 1,019 ft (311 m)
- Coordinates: 33°59′20″N 098°29′31″W
- Website: FlyWichitaFalls.net

Map
- Location SPS (the United States)

Runways
Direction	Length		Surface
Direction	ft	m	Surface
15R/33L	13,100	3,993	Concrete
15C/33C	10,003	3,049	Asphalt/Concrete [CLOSED]
15L/33R	6,000	1,829	Asphalt/Concrete
18/36	7,021	2,140	Asphalt

Statistics (2020)
- Aircraft operations (year ending September 30, 2020): 202,034
- Based aircraft: 213
- Source: Federal Aviation Administration

Wichita Falls Regional Airport (IATA: SPS, ICAO: KSPS, FAA LID: SPS) is a public and military use airport six miles north of Wichita Falls in Wichita County, Texas. Its runways and taxiways are shared with Sheppard Air Force Base; most operations are military, but American Eagle operates scheduled commercial passenger flights to Dallas/Fort Worth International Airport (DFW).

The National Plan of Integrated Airport Systems for 2011–2015 categorized it as a primary commercial service airport. Federal Aviation Administration records say the airport had 47,191 passenger boardings (enplanements) in calendar year 2008, 43,952 in 2009 and 44,296 in 2010.

== History ==
In January 1928, 240 acres (97 ha) of land, along what was then called Burkburnett Road, was purchased from J.A. Kemp in order to build Wichita Falls' first-ever airport. Construction of airplane hangars began later than month, designed by Charles Reid of the engineering firm of Reid and Costley. C.W. Calhoun was the first president of the Wichita Falls Airport Corporation. The airport was originally named Kell Field, in honor of Frank Kell, a prominent financier and builder from Wichita Falls. The airport opened on July 4, 1928. Two U.S. Army airplanes from Brooks Air Force Base in San Antonio were the first airplanes to land at the airport. Originally operated as a privately owned airport, the airport was later sold to the City of Wichita Falls. Commercial air service was moved from Kell Field to Sheppard Air Force Base in 1955.

Braniff Airways first provided service to Wichita Falls Municipal Airport beginning on November 13, 1930. Service continued on an Amarillo-Wichita Falls-Dallas route until 1969 when Braniff was allowed to discontinue its service by the Civil Aeronautics Board. The Civil Aeronautics Board (CAB) approved its request to discontinue service because Braniff International, in 1966, had begun operating the route with its new British Aircraft Corporation BAC One-Eleven "Fastback" twin jets, which seated twice as many passengers as the previous piston-powered Convair 340 and Convair 440 prop aircraft, which had been operating the route. As a result, load factors were not sufficient to continue the service and Braniff discontinued its flights into Wichita Falls on May 7, 1969.

Continental Airlines served Wichita Falls Municipal Airport from 1946 until 1977. The carrier had begun a new route between El Paso and Tulsa stopping at many points including Midland/Odessa, Lubbock, Lawton, and Oklahoma City. In 1977 Continental Airlines asked the Civil Aeronautics Board to approve its request to end its Boeing 727-200 jet service at the airport and have Metro Airlines serve the airport instead. After originally disapproving the request, the Civil Aeronautics Board approved the change. Metro Airlines started serving Wichita Falls on October 30, 1977, with flights serving Lawton, Oklahoma City, and Tulsa. By 1979, Metro Airlines had flights to Dallas–Fort Worth Regional Airport and Houston Intercontinental Airport.

Texas International Airlines began jet service into the airport in 1968 with seven flights a day all operated with McDonnell Douglas DC-9 jetliners. Service consisted of five nonstop flights every weekday to Dallas/Fort Worth plus two daily nonstops to Amarillo, three direct one stop flights to Houston and one daily direct one stop flight to Denver as well as direct no change of plane service to New Orleans, Baton Rouge, Harlingen, McAllen and Monterrey, Mexico.

Rio Airways started service to Wichita Falls in 1971. After signing an agreement with Delta Air Lines in 1984, its flights were branded Delta Connection. Rio Airways discontinued service to Wichita Falls in 1987 due to few passengers aboard its flights.

As of 1980, passengers flying from Wichita Falls to Dallas and connecting to an American Airlines flight could check in at Metro Airlines' ticket counter in Wichita Falls for both of their flights. This was the first time American Airlines had offered such an arrangement. Metro Airlines service between Wichita Falls and Dallas was rebranded as American Eagle starting in 1985.

Texas Star Airlines began providing service from Wichita Falls and Dallas Love Field, Austin, Fort Worth Meacham Airport, and Brownsville in 1981. Two years later, it discontinued all service at Wichita Falls, saying the service was no longer worthwhile with one or two passengers on average on each flight.

Trans-Central Airlines served Wichita Falls for a few months before it went out of business in 1984. Air Spirit Airlines also served Wichita Falls for a few months before it went out of business in 1985.

Atlantic Southeast Airlines began serving Wichita Falls, branded as Delta Connection, in 1986, with flights to Dallas–Fort Worth. Atlantic Southeast Airlines ended these flights in 2001 due to a lack of profitability. This left American Airlines as the only carrier offering scheduled commercial service to Wichita Falls.

== Facilities ==
The airport covers 3,800 acres (1,500 ha) at an elevation of 1,019 feet (311 m). It has four runways:

- 15R/33L is 13,100 by 300 feet (3,993 x 91 m) concrete;
- 15C/33C is 10,003 by 150 feet (3,049 x 46 m) asphalt/concrete [CLOSED];
- 15L/33R is 6,000 by 150 feet (1,829 x 46 m) asphalt/concrete;
- 17/35 is 7,021 by 150 feet (2,140 x 46 m) asphalt.

In the year ending September 30, 2020, the airport had 202,034 aircraft operations, average 553 per day: 97% military, <2% general aviation, and 2% airline. 213 aircraft were then based at this airport: 200 military, 3 single-engine, 9 multi-engine, and 1 jet.

== Airline and destination ==
Airlines	Destinations
American Eagle	Dallas/Fort Worth

Destination map
Destination from Wichita Falls Regional Airport

== See also ==
- Kickapoo Downtown Airport
- List of airports in Texas
