= Burkburnett Independent School District =

School district in Texas, United States

Address
- 100 North Avenue D Burkburnett, Texas, 76354; United States

District information
- Type: Public
- Grades: PK–12
- Schools: 6
- NCES District ID: 4812120

Students and staff
- Students: 3,213 (2025–2026)
- Teachers: 240.22 (on an FTE basis) (2025–2026)
- Staff: 271.78 (on an FTE basis) (2025–2026)
- Student–teacher ratio: 13.38 (2025–2026)

Other information
- Website: www.burkburnettisd.org

Burkburnett Independent School District is a public school district based in Burkburnett, Texas, United States, serving over 3,000 students. The district encompasses the city of Burkburnett and surrounding areas in Wichita County, including a significant number of students from Sheppard Air Force Base (SAFB). Burkburnett ISD offers education from Pre-K through 12th grade.

Burkburnett ISD operates several campuses:

Burkburnett High School (Grades 9–12) Burkburnett Middle School (Grades 6–8) Overton Ray Elementary School (Grades 3-5) I.C. Evans Elementary School (Grades Pre-K–2) John G. Hardin Elementary School (Grades Pre-K–5)
