= U.S. Route 277 =

Highway in the United States

U.S. Route 277
- US 277 highlighted in red

Route information
- Auxiliary route of US 77
- Length: 633 mi (1,019 km)
- Existed: 1930–present

Major junctions
- South end: US 83 at Carrizo Springs, TX
- US 57 at Eagle Pass, TX; US 90 at Del Rio, TX; I-10 at Sonora, TX; US 67 / US 87 at San Angelo, TX; US 83 / US 84 at Abilene, TX; I-20 at Abilene, TX; US 82 / US 183 / US 283 at Seymour, TX; I-44 / US 281 / US 287 at Wichita Falls, TX; US 62 / US 81 / SH-9 at Chickasha, OK
- North end: I-44 / US 62 at Newcastle, OK

Location
- Country: United States
- States: Texas, Oklahoma
- Counties: TX: Dimmit, Marevick, Kinney, Val Verde, Edwards, Sutton, Schleicher, Tom Green, Coke, Runnels, Nolan, Taylor, Jones, Haskell, Wichtia; OK: Cotton, Comanche, Caddo, Grady, McClain

Highway system
- United States Numbered Highway System; List; Special; Divided

U.S. Route 277 (US 277, US-277) is a north–south United States Highway that is a spur route of U.S. Route 77. It no longer connects to its parent route, US 77, although it does intersect another one of its spurs (U.S. Route 377). It runs for 633 miles (1,019 km) across Oklahoma and Texas. US 277's northern terminus is in Newcastle, Oklahoma at Interstate 44, which is also the northern terminus of the H. E. Bailey Turnpike. Its southern terminus is in Carrizo Springs, Texas at U.S. Route 83.

Most of U.S. 277's route through the two states overlaps other U.S. highways. Those include US 62 from Newcastle to Chickasha, Oklahoma, U.S. 62 and U.S. 281 from five miles (8 km) west of Elgin, Oklahoma, to Lawton, U.S. 281 from Lawton to Wichita Falls, Texas, U.S. 82 from Wichita Falls to Seymour, Texas, and U.S. 83 from Anson, Texas to Abilene, Texas. Through the Lawton area and again from Randlett, Oklahoma, to near downtown Wichita Falls, U.S. 277 is also co-signed with I-44.

== Route description ==
Lengths
| | mi | km |
|---|---|---|
| TX | 508.9 | 819.0 |
| OK | 124.47 | 200.315 |

=== Texas ===
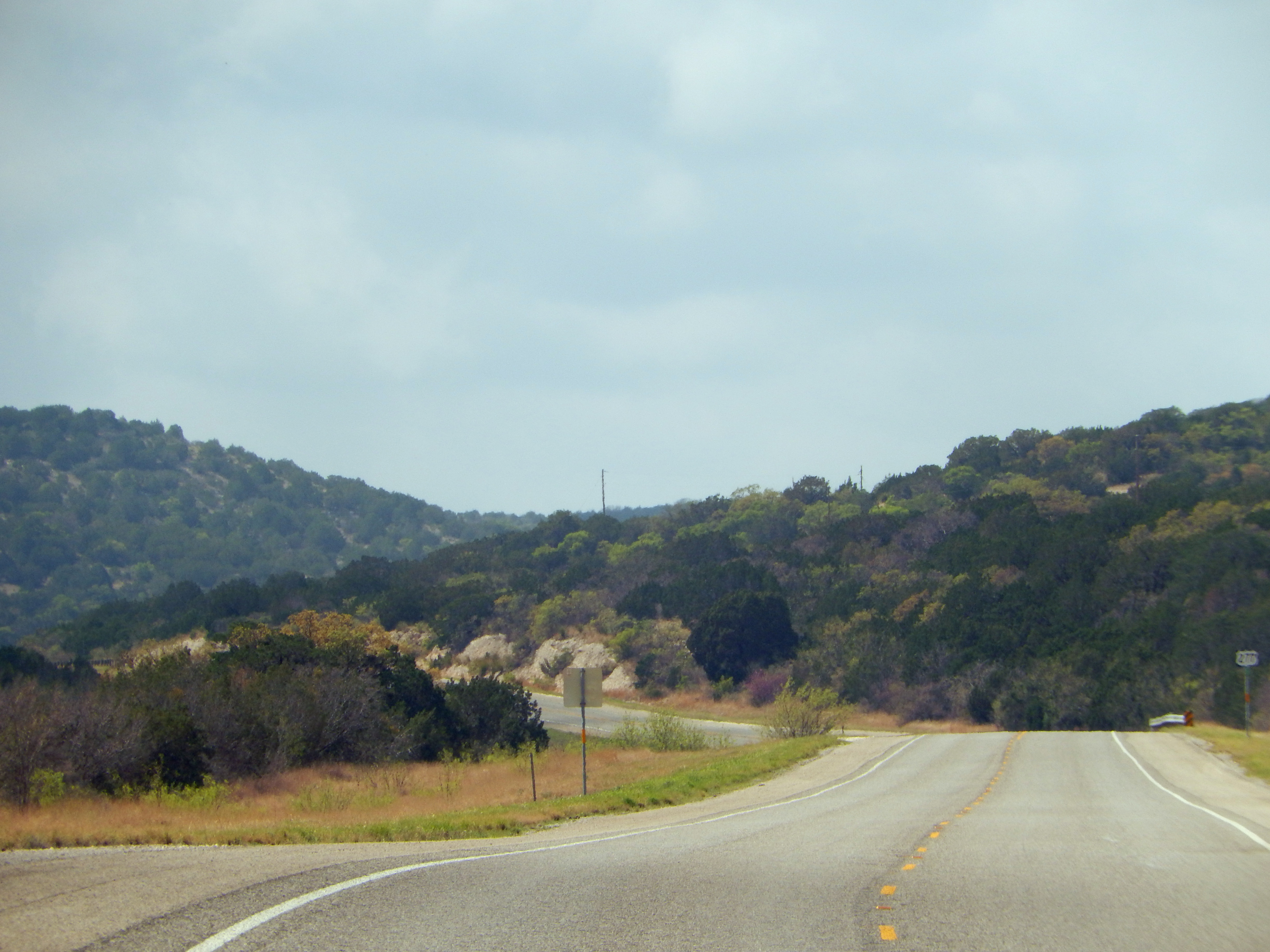
Scenic view of U.S. 277 between Del Rio and Sonora, Texas

The highway begins at an intersection with US 83 in Carrizo Springs, about 60 miles northwest of Laredo. The highway runs in an east-west direction, until reaching Eagle Pass. From here to Del Rio, the highway parallels the Rio Grande at the U.S.-Mexico border. The highway overlaps US 377 for about 26 miles, with the highways passing the Amistad National Recreation Area.

US 277 crosses I-10 near Sonora, before traveling to Eldorado and eventually San Angelo. The highway overlaps both US 67 and US 87 in the city. In Abilene, the highway overlaps with US 83 and US 84 as the Winters Freeway, with US 84 leaving shortly after. US 83 leaves in Anson, traveling to Aspermont, while US 277 travels to Stamford. In Seymour, US 82 begins an overlap with US 277. The two highways enter the city of Wichita Falls, with US 82 leaving the highway at US 281/US 287. US 277 joins US 281/287 and the three highways travel into the downtown area of the city, where I-44 begins. US 287 leaves the freeway, while I-44/US 277/US 281 travel to Burkburnett, before crossing the Red River into Oklahoma.

=== Oklahoma ===
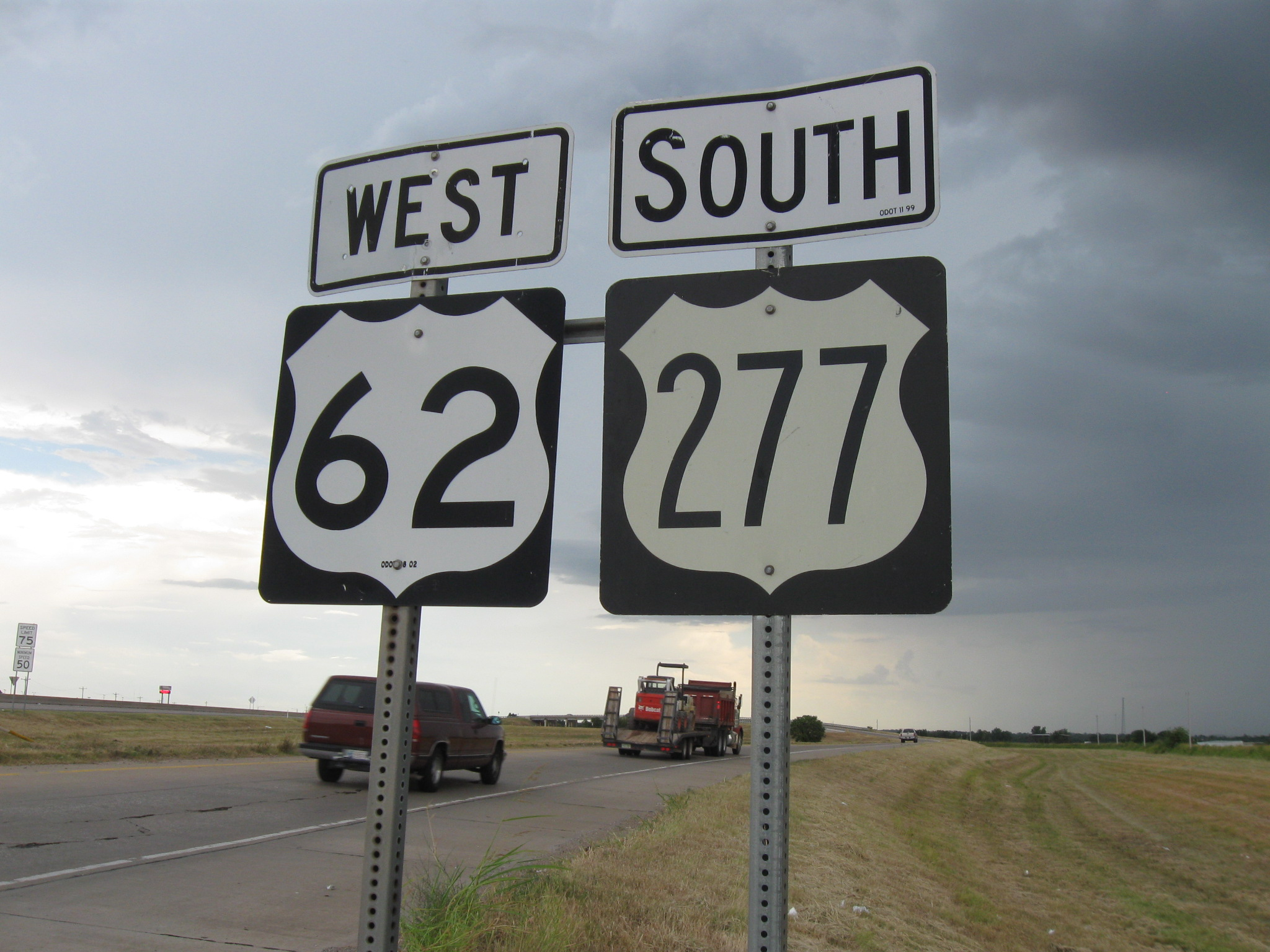
First southbound sign for U.S. 277 in Newcastle, Oklahoma (US 277 sign has since been replaced with a newer version)

U.S 277 and 281 enter into Oklahoma with Interstate 44 from Texas by crossing the Red River. After six miles, U.S. 277-281 leave the H.E. Bailey Turnpike and run concurrently for three miles eastward with U.S. 70. On the outskirts of Randlett, this ends as U.S. 277-281 turn northward and pass under I-44 (with no interchange there) before entering Cookietown. North of Cookietown, U.S. 277-281 travel along SH 5. Near the town of Geronimo, U.S. 277-281 join I-44 at Exit 30 to bypass Lawton, but separate once again along with U.S. 62 north of the city at Exit 46. After a distance just under four miles, U.S. 277 separates from U.S. 62-281 and heads east for the town of Elgin. The route proceeds from there to serve several other towns bypassed by I-44, such as Fletcher, Cyril, and Cement, crossing the turnpike twice without direct access. Entering the town of Chickasha with U.S. 81, U.S. 277 turns east along U.S. 62 and follows it all the way to its northern terminus at I-44 near Newcastle.

From Newcastle to the Red River north of Wichita Falls, Texas, U.S. 277 (and concurrent sections of U.S. 62, U.S. 81 and U.S. 281) serves as an alternate free route to the two sections of the H.E. Bailey Turnpike between Oklahoma City and the Red River from Newcastle southwest of Oklahoma to near Medicine Park north of Lawton and from near Geronimo south of Lawton to Randlett just north of the Red River near Burkburnett, Texas.

== History ==
When US 277 was commissioned in 1930, it ended at the Mexico–United States border in Del Rio, Texas. It was extended southeast to its present terminus in 1952. The original northern terminus was in Oklahoma City at its intersection with parent route US 77 and US 62. The northern terminus remained there until 1964. when it was truncated to its present terminus following the completion of the H.E. Bailey Turnpike and the connecting US 62 freeway into Oklahoma City, which would become I-44 in the 1980s. The section of highway through Wichita Falls was recently upgraded to a freeway. Known as Kell Boulevard, the freeway opened in late-2009/early-2010.

As of February 2010, US 277 allows a speed limit of 75 miles per hour (121 km/h) only in Dimmit County, Texas.

== Future ==
On March 15, 2022, a bill was signed by President Joe Biden that added the extension of I-27 north to Raton, New Mexico, and south to Laredo to the Interstate Highway System. The extension would utilize the US 277 corridor between San Angelo and Carrizo Springs, Texas.

== Major intersections ==
| State | County | Location | mi | km | Destinations | Notes |
|---|---|---|---|---|---|---|
| Texas | Dimmit | Carrizo Springs | 0.0 | 0.0 | US 83 (First Street) to SH 85 – Crystal City, Uvalde, Laredo | Southern terminus |
| Texas | Dimmit | Carrizo Springs | 0.2 | 0.32 | Loop 225 (5th Street) | |
| Texas | Dimmit | Carrizo Springs | 0.4 | 0.64 | FM 790 north (9th Street) | |
| Texas | Dimmit | | 1.6 | 2.6 | FM 2644 west – El Indio | |
| Texas | Dimmit | | 2.4 | 3.9 | Loop 517 east | |
| Texas | Dimmit | | 8.7 | 14.0 | FM 191 east – Crystal City | |
| Texas | Dimmit | | 11.6 | 18.7 | FM 393 east | |
| Texas | Maverick | | 39.3 | 63.2 | Loop 480 | Interchange |
| Texas | Maverick | Eagle Pass | 41.4 | 66.6 | US 57 north – La Pryor | Southern end of US 57 concurrency |
| Texas | Maverick | Eagle Pass | 42.1 | 67.8 | US 57 south / Bus. US 277 north / FM 3443 south (Veterans Boulevard) to FM 1021 – Eagle Pass, Piedras Negras, International Bridge | Northern end of US 57 concurrency |
| Texas | Maverick | Eagle Pass | 42.8 | 68.9 | Spur 216 east (2nd Street) | |
| Texas | Maverick | Eagle Pass | 44.4 | 71.5 | Flowers Drive | Interchange |
| Texas | Maverick | Eagle Pass | 44.8 | 72.1 | Barrera Street | Interchange |
| Texas | Maverick | Eagle Pass | 44.9 | 72.3 | Bus. US 277 south – Eagle Pass | |
| Texas | Maverick | Seco Mines | 45.9 | 73.9 | FM 1589 | |
| Texas | Maverick | | 46.6 | 75.0 | FM 1588 east | |
| Texas | Maverick | | 47.2 | 76.0 | FM 1589 | |
| Texas | Maverick | | 52.8 | 85.0 | FM 1907 west | |
| Texas | Maverick | | 54.6 | 87.9 | SH 131 north – Brackettville | |
| Texas | Maverick | | 55.5 | 89.3 | FM 1665 west | |
| Texas | Maverick | | 58.3 | 93.8 | FM 1665 east | |
| Texas | Maverick | Normandy | 58.9 | 94.8 | FM 1590 west | |
| Texas | Maverick | | 60.1 | 96.7 | FM 1908 north – Spofford, Brackettville | |
| Texas | Maverick | | 60.6 | 97.5 | FM 1664 east | |
| Texas | Maverick | | 61.0 | 98.2 | FM 1666 east | |
| Texas | Maverick | | 63.2 | 101.7 | FM 1591 east | |
| Texas | Maverick | | 63.8 | 102.7 | FM 1664 west | |
| Texas | Kinney | | 78.1 | 125.7 | RM 693 north – Brackettville | |
| Texas | Val Verde | | 92.0 | 148.1 | Spur 317 – Laughlin AFB West Gate Entrance | |
| Texas | Val Verde | | 92.4 | 148.7 | Loop 79 north – El Paso | |
| Texas | Val Verde | Del Rio | 97.1 | 156.3 | Spur 277 – Ciudad Acuña | Interchange |
| Texas | Val Verde | Del Rio | 97.3 | 156.6 | US 90 east – San Antonio | Southern end of US 90 concurrency |
| Texas | Val Verde | Del Rio | 98.0 | 157.7 | US 377 south (East Gibbs Street) / Spur 239 south (Veteran's Boulevard) / Spur 297 – Ciudad Acuña, Business District | Southern end of US 377 concurrency |
| Texas | Val Verde | | 102.5 | 165.0 | US 90 west – Comstock, Sanderson, Amistad NRA Visitor Information, Big Bend National Park | Northern end of US 90 concurrency |
| Texas | Val Verde | | 103.5 | 166.6 | Loop 79 to US 90 – Eagle Pass | Interchange |
| Texas | Val Verde | | 115.6 | 186.0 | RE 2 west – Amistad National Recreation Area, Rough Canyon | |
| Texas | Val Verde | | 124.5 | 200.4 | US 377 north – Rocksprings | Northern end of US 377 concurrency |
| Texas | Edwards | | 166.3 | 267.6 | SH 55 south – Rocksprings | |
| Texas | Sutton | | 172.4 | 277.5 | RM 189 west – Juno | |
| Texas | Sutton | Sonora | 188.2 | 302.9 | Loop 467 east | Southern end of Loop 467 concurrency |
| Texas | Sutton | Sonora | 188.9 | 304.0 | Loop 467 west | Northern end of Loop 467 concurrency |
| Texas | Sutton | Sonora | 189.2 | 304.5 | I-10 – Ozona, Junction | I-10 exit 400 |
| Texas | Schleicher | | 206.8 | 332.8 | FM 2129 west | |
| Texas | Schleicher | Eldorado | 209.1 | 336.5 | US 190 west – Iraan | Southern end of US 190 concurrency |
| Texas | Schleicher | Eldorado | 209.6 | 337.3 | US 190 east / RM 915 north – Mertzon, Menard, Airport | Northern end of US 190 concurrency |
| Texas | Tom Green | | 233.7 | 376.1 | Loop 110 to RM 2084 – Christoval | |
| Texas | Tom Green | | 234.6 | 377.6 | Loop 110 to RM 2084 – Christoval | |
| Texas | Tom Green | | 237.3 | 381.9 | FM 2335 north – Knickerbocker | |
| Texas | Tom Green | Pecan Station | 243.8 | 392.4 | RM 584 north – Regional Airport | |
| Texas | Tom Green | San Angelo | 248.9– 249.7 | 400.6– 401.9 | US 87 south / Loop 306 east / Loop 378 – Eden | Interchange; southern end of US 87 / Loop 306 concurrency |
| Texas | Tom Green | San Angelo | See US 87 | | | |
| Texas | Tom Green | San Angelo | 254.3– 254.7 | 409.3– 409.9 | US 67 south / US 87 north (North Bryant Boulevard) | Interchange; northern end of US 87 / US 67 Bus. concurrency; southern end of US 67 concurrency |
| Texas | Tom Green | See US 67 | | | | |
| Texas | Tom Green | | 259.4– 260.3 | 417.5– 418.9 | US 67 north – Ballinger | Interchange; northern end of US 67 concurrency |
| Texas | Tom Green | | 261.6 | 421.0 | FM 2105 west to US 87 – San Angelo | |
| Texas | Coke | | 278.0 | 447.4 | FM 2333 east – Miles | |
| Texas | Coke | | 281.0 | 452.2 | FM 2662 west to SH 208 | |
| Texas | Coke | Bronte | 287.2 | 462.2 | SH 158 east – Ballinger | Southern end of SH 158 concurrency |
| Texas | Coke | Bronte | 287.6 | 462.8 | SH 158 west (West Main Street) – Robert Lee | Northern end of SH 158 concurrency |
| Texas | Coke | | 289.0 | 465.1 | FM 384 east – Winters | |
| Texas | Coke | | 296.4 | 477.0 | SH 70 north – Sweetwater, Oak Creek Lake, Blackwell | Interchange |
| Texas | Runnels | No major junctions | | | | |
| Texas | Nolan | No major junctions | | | | |
| Texas | Taylor | | 306.9 | 493.9 | SH 153 – Sweetwater, Winters, Wingate | Interchange |
| Texas | Taylor | Happy Valley | 310.5 | 499.7 | FM 1086 west – Shep | Southern end of FM 1086 concurrency |
| Texas | Taylor | | 310.8 | 500.2 | FM 1086 east – Bradshaw | Northern end of FM 1086 concurrency |
| Texas | Taylor | | 321.7 | 517.7 | FM 89 – Nolan, Buffalo Gap, Abilene State Park | |
| Texas | Taylor | View | 330.4 | 531.7 | FM 1235 – Merkel, Buffalo Gap | |
| Texas | Taylor | Caps | 333.8 | 537.2 | FM 707 – Tye | |
| Texas | Taylor | Abilene | 337.1 | 542.5 | FM 3438 north (Dub Wright Boulevard) / Rebecca Lane – Dyess AFB | Interchange |
| Texas | Taylor | Abilene | 338.9– 339.8 | 545.4– 546.9 | US 83 south / US 84 east / South 14th Street – Ballinger, Coleman, Airport, McMurry University | Interchange; southern end of US 83 / US 84 concurrency; south end of freeway |
| Texas | see US 83 | | | | | |
| Texas | Jones | | 366.1 | 589.2 | US 83 north – Hamlin | Northern end of US 83 concurrency |
| Texas | Jones | | 372.5 | 599.5 | FM 1636 west | Southern end of FM 1636 concurrency |
| Texas | Jones | | 372.9 | 600.1 | FM 1636 east – Avoca | Northern end of FM 1636 concurrency |
| Texas | Jones | | 377.2 | 607.0 | SH 92 west – Hamlin | |
| Texas | Jones | | 377.3 | 607.2 | FM 2702 east – truck route to SH 6 south | |
| Texas | Jones | | 378.5 | 609.1 | Bus. US 277 north | |
| Texas | Jones | Stamford | 378.8 | 609.6 | Bus. US 277 to SH 6 – Stamford | Interchange |
| Texas | Haskell | Stamford | 380.7 | 612.7 | Bus. US 277 south / SH 6 / SH 283 – Rule, Aspermont, Stamford | Interchange |
| Texas | Haskell | | 385.9 | 621.0 | FM 618 north – Paint Creek, Lake Stamford | |
| Texas | Haskell | | | | FM 1225 west | |
| Texas | Haskell | | | | Bus. US 277 north – Haskell | |
| Texas | Haskell | Haskell | | | US 380 – Haskell | Interchange; Access to Haskell Memorial Hospital |
| Texas | Haskell | | | | Bus. US 277 south / County Road 210 – Haskell, Airport | |
| Texas | Haskell | | | | FM 1080 east | |
| Texas | Haskell | | | | Bus. US 277 north – Weinert | |
| Texas | Haskell | Weinert | | | FM 617 – Rochester | |
| Texas | Haskell | | | | Bus. US 277 south – Weinert | |
| Texas | Haskell | | | | FM 1720 east – Throckmorton | |
| Texas | Knox | | | | FM 2365 west | |
| Texas | Knox | | | | FM 267 north | |
| Texas | Knox | Munday | | | Bus. US 277 north | |
| Texas | Knox | Munday | | | SH 222 – Munday | Interchange |
| Texas | Knox | | | | Bus. US 277 south | |
| Texas | Knox | | | | Spur 357 north – Goree | |
| Texas | Knox | Goree | | | FM 266 – Goree | Interchange |
| Texas | Baylor | Bomarton | | | FM 1152 south – Miller Creek Reservoir | |
| Texas | Baylor | | | | FM 1152 south – Miller Creek Reservoir | |
| Texas | Baylor | | | | FM 2070 west | |
| Texas | Baylor | | | | FM 2395 south | |
| Texas | Baylor | | | | US 183 south / US 283 south – Throckmorton | Southern end of US 183 / US 283 concurrency |
| Texas | Baylor | | | | Bus. US 183 north (Main Street / US 277 Bus. north / US 283 Bus. north) | Interchange; south end of freeway |
| Texas | Baylor | | | | SH 114 – Seymour, Olney | |
| Texas | Baylor | | | | FM 422 – Seymour, Archer City | Access to Seymour Hospital |
| Texas | Baylor | | | | US 82 west / Bus. US 183 south (US 277 Bus. south / US 283 Bus. south) – Seymour, Lubbock | Interchange; north end of freeway; southern end of US 82 concurrency |
| Texas | Baylor | Mabelle | | | US 183 north / US 283 north / FM 1790 south – Lake Kemp, Vernon | Northern end of US 183 / US 283 concurrency |
| Texas | Archer | Dundee | | | FM 2846 north – Lake Diversion | |
| Texas | Archer | | | | FM 368 north – Lake Kickapoo | |
| Texas | Archer | Mankins | | | SH 25 – Electra, Archer City | |
| Texas | Archer | | | | Bus. US 82 east / Bus. US 277 north – Holliday | |
| Texas | Archer | Holliday | | | FM 368 – Holliday | Interchange |
| Texas | Archer | | | | Bus. US 82 west / Bus. US 277 south – Holliday | Interchange |
| Texas | Wichita | | | | SH 258 west – Kamay | |
| Texas | Wichita | Wichita Falls | | | FM 369 (Southwest Parkway) | Interchange; south end of freeway |
| Texas | Wichita | Wichita Falls | | | Bus. US 277 north (Seymour Highway) / FM 2650 (Allendale Road) | No direct northbound exit (signed at FM 369) |
| Texas | Wichita | Wichita Falls | | | FM 1634 (Barnett Road) | Access to Kell West Regional Hospital |
| Texas | Wichita | Wichita Falls | | | Fairway Boulevard | |
| Texas | Wichita | Wichita Falls | | | McNiel Avenue | |
| Texas | Wichita | Wichita Falls | | | Lawrence Road / Lebanon Road | No direct northbound exit (signed at McNiel Avenue) |
| Texas | Wichita | Wichita Falls | | | Kemp Boulevard | |
| Texas | Wichita | Wichita Falls | | | Taft Boulevard | |
| Texas | Wichita | Wichita Falls | | | Harrison Street | no direct northbound exit (signed at Taft Boulevard) |
| Texas | Wichita | Wichita Falls | | | Brook Avenue | Northbound exit and southbound entrance |
| Texas | Wichita | Wichita Falls | | | Spur 447 east / Broad Street | Northbound exit and southbound entrance |
| Texas | Wichita | Wichita Falls | | | US 82 east / US 281 south / US 287 south – Jacksboro, Texarkana, Fort Worth | Northern end of US 82 concurrency; southern end of US 281 / US 287 concurrency |
| Texas | Wichita | Wichita Falls | | | 6th Street – MPEC | Northbound exit and southbound entrance |
See I-44
| Red River | | | | | Unnamed bridge | |
See I-44
| Oklahoma | Cotton | Devol | | | I-44 east / US 70 west / H.E. Bailey Turnpike – Lawton, Chickasha, Oklahoma City, Grandfield | Northern end of I-44 concurrency; southern end of US 70 concurrency; US 277 north follows I-44 exit 5 |
| Oklahoma | Cotton | Randlett | | | US 70 east – Waurika | Northern end of US 70 concurrency |
| Oklahoma | Cotton | | | | SH-5A to SH-5 – Temple | |
| Oklahoma | Cotton | Walters | | | SH-5 south – Frederick | Southern end of SH 5 concurrency |
| Oklahoma | Cotton | Walters | | | I-44 / US 281 / H.E. Bailey Turnpike | Access to Walters Municipal Airport; southern end of US 281 concurrency; I-44 exit 20 |
| Oklahoma | Cotton | Walters | | | SH-5 north – Temple | Northern end of SH 5 concurrency |
| Oklahoma | Comanche | Fort Sill | | | US 281 Bus. – Lawton | |
| Oklahoma | Comanche | Fort Sill | | | I-44 west / SH-36 / H.E. Bailey Turnpike – Wichita Falls, Chattanooga | Southern end of I-44 concurrency; I-44 exit 30 |
| Oklahoma | Comanche | See I-44 | | | | |
| Oklahoma | Comanche | Fletcher | | | I-44 east / US 62 / H.E. Bailey Turnpike – Chickasha | Northern end of I-44 concurrency; I-44 exit 46; no direct access to/from northbound I-44 |
| Oklahoma | Comanche | Porter Hill | | | US 62 north / US 281 east – Anadarko, Chickasha | Northern end of US 62 / US 281 concurrency |
| Oklahoma | Comanche | Elgin | | | I-44 / H.E. Bailey Turnpike – Wichita Falls, Oklahoma City | I-44 exit 53 |
| Oklahoma | Comanche | Elgin | | | SH-17 – Sterling, Rush Springs | |
| Oklahoma | Caddo | Cyril | | | SH-19 west – Apache | Southern end of SH 19 concurrency |
| Oklahoma | Caddo | | | | SH-8 – Anadarko | |
| Oklahoma | Grady | Ninnekah | | | US 81 south – Rush Springs | Southern end of US 81 concurrency |
| Oklahoma | Grady | See US 81 | | | | |
| Oklahoma | Grady | Chickasha | | | US 62 west / US 81 north – Minko, Anadarko | Northern end of US 81 concurrency; southern end of US 62 concurrency |
| Oklahoma | See US 62 | | | | | |
| Oklahoma | McClain | Newcastle | | | I-44 / US 62 / H.E. Bailey Turnpike – Chickasha, Lawton, Burkburnett, Wichita Falls | Northern terminus; northern end of US 62 concurrency; I-44 exit 107 |
1.000 mi = 1.609 km; 1.000 km = 0.621 mi: Concurrency terminus; Incomplete access

== Business routes ==
- Wichita Falls, Texas (Bus. US 277-A)
- Holliday, Texas (Bus. US 277-B)
- Seymour, Texas (Bus. US 277-C)
- Munday, Texas (Bus. US 277-E)
- Weinert, Texas (Bus. US 277-F)
- Haskell, Texas (Bus. US 277-G)
- Stamford, Texas (Bus. US 277-N)
- Eagle Pass, Texas (Bus. US 277-P)

=== Former Lawton business route ===
The former route of U.S. 277 (and 281) through the City of Lawton via 2nd Street and 11th Street (and a diagonal street connecting those two streets) has been designated as U.S. 281 Business since the completion of Lawton's Pioneer Expressway (now I-44) in 1964 from present I-44 Exit 39-B to Exit 33. Present U.S. 281 Business and former U.S. 277-281 follows 2nd Street south of I-44 (Exit 39B) into the downtown area and south of Lee Boulevard (Oklahoma 7), curves into the diagonal route to 11th Street and still locally designated by the City of Lawton as Highway 277 even though it is officially designated as U.S. 281 Business. From the end of the diagonal route at 11th and Tennessee Avenue south past the Lawton-Fort Sill Regional Airport to Exit 33 of Interstate 44, the former U.S. 277-281 and current U.S. Business 281 route follows 11th Street. South of this point, U.S. 281 Business ends/begins and current U.S. 277-281 continues to run concurrent with I-44 for another 3 miles to Exit 30 (the starting/ending point for the southern section of the H.E. Bailey Turnpike), bypassing 3 miles of the former U.S. 277-281 concurrency that followed 11th Street south of Lawton until the completion of the present I-44 route south of Lawton in 1964, when the former highway reverted to local jurisdiction. At Exit 31, Oklahoma 36 begins its route to Chattanooga and Grandfield west of I-44 while U.S. 277-281 uses the same route east of the interstate for a half-mile and turning south toward Geronimo, over the continuation of Lawton's 11th Street.

== See also ==
=== Related routes ===
- U.S. Route 77
- U.S. Route 177
- U.S. Route 377

Browse numbered routes
| ← SH 276 | TX | → SH 279 |
| ← US 271 | OK | → US 281 |
