= Burkburnett, Texas =

- City
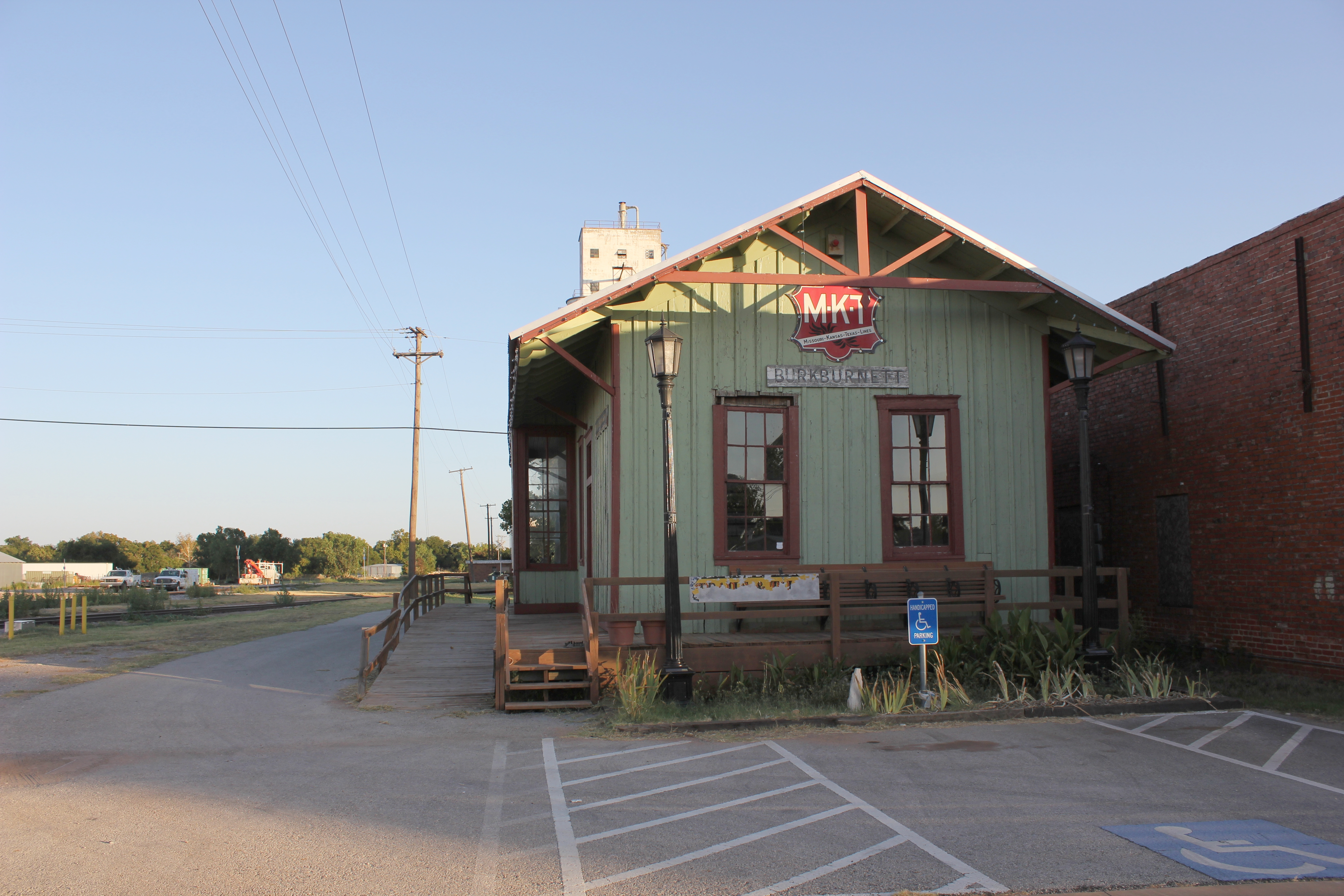
- Former Missouri–Kansas–Texas Railroad depot
- Nicknames: Boomtown, U.S.A.
- Motto: "You're home now!”
- Interactive map of Burkburnett, Texas
- Coordinates: 34°04′28″N 98°34′02″W
- Country: United States
- State: Texas
- County: Wichita
- Incorporated City of Burkburnett: 1923

Government
  - Type: Commissioner form of government, with a City Manager

Area
  - Total: 11.54 sq mi (29.90 km^{2})
  - Land: 11.54 sq mi (29.90 km^{2})
  - Water: 0 sq mi (0.00 km^{2})
- Elevation: 1,040 ft (320 m)

Population (2020)
  - Total: 10,939
  - Density: 947.6/sq mi (365.9/km^{2})
- Time zone: UTC-6 (Central (CST))
  - Summer (DST): UTC-5 (CDT)
- ZIP code: 76354
- Area code: 940
- FIPS code: 48-11368
- GNIS feature ID: 2409941
- Website: www.burkburnett.org

Burkburnett (/ˌbɜːrkbɜːrˈnɛt/) is a city in Wichita County, Texas, United States. It is part of the Wichita Falls, Texas metropolitan statistical area. Its population was 10,939 at the 2020 census.

== History ==
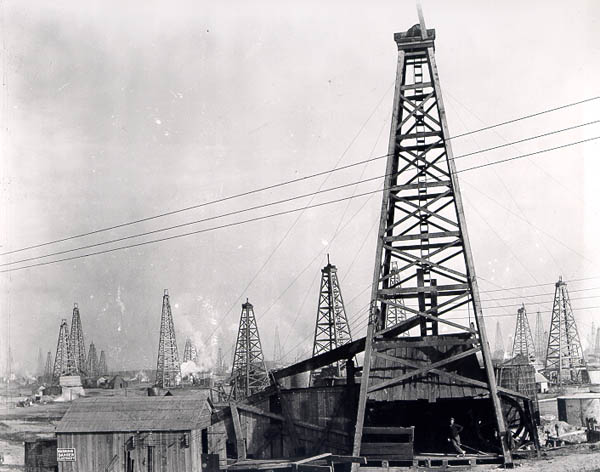
Oil derricks at Burkburnett, circa 1920

Originally settled by ranchers as early as 1856, this community was known by some locals as Nesterville. By 1880, the town had a small store with a population of 132. From 1882 until 1903, a post office operated there under the designation Gilbert, named after the North Texas pioneer Mabel Gilbert. In 1906, a nearby wealthy rancher named Samuel Burk Burnett sold more than 16,000 acres (65 km^{2}) of his land in northern Wichita County to a group of investors who were seeking to extend into the wheat-growing area of Western Oklahoma the Wichita Falls and Northwestern Railway, one of the Frank Kell/Joseph A. Kemp properties based in Wichita Falls.

Within Burnett's former land near the railroad, lots were auctioned off the following year and a post office was established. The town was named Burkburnett by U.S. President Theodore Roosevelt, who visited the area for a wolf hunt that was hosted by the wealthy rancher Burnett. In 1912, oil was discovered west of the town, attracting thousands to the area, and by 1918, approximately 20,000 people had settled around the oilfield. This part of the town's history was chronicled in the film, Boom Town with Clark Gable and Spencer Tracy. The Great Depression had a negative impact on the town's population, which was boosted again in 1941 as Sheppard Air Force Base was established nearby.

== Geography ==
According to the United States Census Bureau, Burkburnett has a total area of 9.5 square miles (24.6 km^{2}), all land.

=== Climate ===
The climate in this area is characterized by hot, humid summers and generally mild to cool winters. According to the Köppen climate classification, Burkburnett has a humid subtropical climate, Cfa on climate maps.

Climate data for Burkburnett, Texas
Month	Jan	Feb	Mar	Apr	May	Jun	Jul	Aug	Sep	Oct	Nov	Dec	Year
Record high °F (°C)	89 (32)	93 (34)	100 (38)	103 (39)	110 (43)	117 (47)	114 (46)	113 (45)	111 (44)	102 (39)	89 (32)	88 (31)	117 (47)
Mean daily maximum °F (°C)	54 (12)	58 (14)	67 (19)	76 (24)	84 (29)	91 (33)	97 (36)	97 (36)	88 (31)	77 (25)	65 (18)	55 (13)	76 (24)
Daily mean °F (°C)	42 (6)	46 (8)	54 (12)	63 (17)	72 (22)	80 (27)	85 (29)	84 (29)	76 (24)	65 (18)	53 (12)	43 (6)	64 (18)
Mean daily minimum °F (°C)	30 (−1)	34 (1)	41 (5)	49 (9)	60 (16)	68 (20)	72 (22)	71 (22)	63 (17)	52 (11)	40 (4)	31 (−1)	51 (10)
Record low °F (°C)	−12 (−24)	−8 (−22)	6 (−14)	24 (−4)	36 (2)	50 (10)	54 (12)	53 (12)	38 (3)	21 (−6)	14 (−10)	−7 (−22)	−12 (−24)

== Demographics ==
Historical population
Census	Pop.	Note	%±
1920	5,300		—
1930	3,281		−38.1%
1940	2,814		−14.2%
1950	4,555		61.9%
1960	7,621		67.3%
1970	9,230		21.1%
1980	10,668		15.6%
1990	10,145		−4.9%
2000	10,927		7.7%
2010	10,811		−1.1%
2020	10,939		1.2%
U.S. Decennial Census

=== 2020 census ===
Burkburnett racial composition as of 2020 (NH = Non-Hispanic) (Note: Note: the US Census treats Hispanic/Latino as an ethnic category. This table excludes Latinos from the racial categories and assigns them to a separate category. Hispanics/Latinos can be of any race.)
Race	Number	Percentage
White (NH)	8,518	77.87%
Black or African American (NH)	338	3.09%
Native American or Alaska Native (NH)	95	0.87%
Asian (NH)	85	0.78%
Pacific Islander (NH)	5	0.05%
Some Other Race (NH)	28	0.26%
Mixed/Multi-Racial (NH)	639	5.84%
Hispanic or Latino	1,231	11.25%
Total	10,939	

Racial composition as of the 2020 census
Race	Percent
White	81.8%
Black or African American	3.2%
American Indian and Alaska Native	1.0%
Asian	0.8%
Native Hawaiian and Other Pacific Islander	0.1%
Some other race	3.1%
Two or more races	9.9%
Hispanic or Latino (of any race)	11.3%

As of the 2020 census, Burkburnett had a population of 10,939 people and 3,330 families residing in the city. The median age was 38.0 years. 25.2% of residents were under the age of 18 and 17.2% of residents were 65 years of age or older. For every 100 females there were 92.9 males, and for every 100 females age 18 and over there were 89.4 males age 18 and over.

95.5% of residents lived in urban areas, while 4.5% lived in rural areas.

There were 4,311 households in Burkburnett, of which 34.2% had children under the age of 18 living in them. Of all households, 49.4% were married-couple households, 16.3% were households with a male householder and no spouse or partner present, and 26.8% were households with a female householder and no spouse or partner present. About 24.9% of all households were made up of individuals and 11.1% had someone living alone who was 65 years of age or older.

There were 4,783 housing units, of which 9.9% were vacant. Among occupied housing units, 65.7% were owner-occupied and 34.3% were renter-occupied. The homeowner vacancy rate was 2.2% and the rental vacancy rate was 10.1%.

== Government ==
The city of Burkburnett is a home-rule municipality. The governing body is composed of seven city commissioners who are elected by the voters at-large, rather than by district. The commissioners serve staggered, two-year terms, with four elected during even-numbered years and three elected during odd-numbered years. The commissioners are charged with electing the mayor from among the city commissioners, and appointing or reappointing the city manager. The mayor is the traditional public figurehead of the city, while the city manager is responsible for the day-to-day operations within the city government.

== Education ==
The City of Burkburnett is served by the Burkburnett Independent School District. The school district operates three elementary schools: I.C. Evans Elementary, John G. Tower Elementary, and Overton Ray Elementary, Burkburnett Middle School, and Burkburnett High School. I.C. Evans houses the Burkburnett Head Start program. John G. Tower is located in Wichita Falls, minutes from Sheppard AFB. The mascot for all Burkburnett schools are Bulldogs.

== Notable people ==
- Skip Hicks (1974) American Football Player
- Nolan Miller (1933-2012), Fashion designer, was born in Burkburnett.
