= Mankins, Texas =

- Unincorporated community
- Location within the state of Texas Mankins (the United States)
- Coordinates: 33°46′56″N 98°47′50″W
- Country: United States
- State: Texas
- County: Archer
- Elevation: 1,112 ft (339 m)

Population (2000)
  - Total: 10
- Time zone: UTC-6 (Central (CST))
  - Summer (DST): UTC-5 (CDT)
- GNIS feature ID: 1362131

Mankins is an unincorporated community located in Archer County, Texas, United States. According to the Handbook of Texas, the community had a population of 10 in 2000. Mankins is located within the Wichita Falls Metropolitan Statistical Area.

== History ==
The area was settled around 1889. In 1890, the Wichita Valley Railway came through. It built a station to load grain and a church was built. It was originally named Lazarus Switch. The ranch was bought by Charles Mangold in 1908, who then built a store and hotel by the railroad. It was built a mile south of the ranch headquarters. The town was named after Tom Mankins, who was the foreman for the nearby Lazarus Ranch, which is north of the community. Mankins operated a general store in the area. In 1909, a post office opened. By 1914, there was a cattle breeder, three cattle feeding companies, and two cotton buyers, and around 55 people resided in the area. Oil was discovered in the 1920s. Three oilfields were operating 42 wells between 1923 and 1926 in Mankins. Its population rose to 85 by the late 1920s and stayed there for a decade. A brick building was built and was used as a community center and church during that same period. Methodists were the only religious denomination in the area until Baptists came in 1936. It then had 6 businesses in operation. Methodists moved to Holliday when a tornado struck the town in 1938. An abandoned church from Bowman was moved to the community in 1941. By 1950, the population rose to 120 and had four businesses operating. The post office closed in 1963. The next year, there were no businesses and its population dropped to 50 by the end of that decade. Water access improved in the 1970s, but town lots that were still owned by Mangold's estate were not for sale, so it was unable to continue growing. Its population was 45 in 1990 then plunged to 10 in 2000. Mankins also served as the hosting facility for the D.S. Dudley Circus and carnival in the 1970s.

The specific name of Eothyris refers to J.R. Parkey, a local landowner from Mankins who assisted the Museum of Comparative Zoology field crew in collecting fossils on his property.

== Geography ==
Mankins is located at the intersection of U.S. Highway 82, U.S. Highway 277, and Texas State Highway 25, 18 miles northwest of Archer City and 19 mi (31 km) southwest of Wichita Falls in northwestern Archer County.

== Education ==
The community's first school was Lone Star School, which opened in 1889. It continued to have a school in 1914. In the 1930s, there was a brick building that was used as a high school, which was destroyed by a tornado in 1938. The school was rebuilt and used until 1941. It joined the Holliday Independent School District soon after. The community continues to be served by Holliday ISD today.
