= Holliday High School =

Location
- 751 College Avenue; Holliday, Archer County, Texas 76366; United States; 33.808475°N 98.689564°W

Information
- School type: Public, high school
- Locale: Rural: distant
- School district: Holliday ISD
- NCES School ID: 482340002375
- Principal: David Holbert
- Staff: 34.31 (on an FTE basis)
- Grades: 9–12
- Enrollment: 364 (2023–24)
- Student to teacher ratio: 10.61
- Colors: Red, white & gray
- Athletics conference: UIL Class 3A
- Mascot: Eagle/Lady Eagle
- Website: www.hollidayisd.net/140368_2

Holliday High School is a public high school located in Holliday, Texas, United States. It is classified as a 3A school by the UIL. It is part of the Holliday Independent School District located in northwestern Archer County. During 2023–2024, Holliday High School had an enrollment of 364 students and a student-to-teacher ratio of 10.61. The school received an overall rating of "A" from the Texas Education Agency for the 2021–2022 school year.

== Athletics ==
The Holliday Eagles compete in the following sports:

- Baseball
- Basketball
- Cross country
- Football
- Golf
- Softball
- Tennis
- Track and field
- Volleyball

== Lone Star Cup titles ==
- 1998–1999
- 1999–2000
- 2001–2002
- 2003–2004
- 2004–2005
- 2023–2024
- 2024-2025

== State titles ==
- Girls' basketball
  - 2023 (3A)
- Girls' cross country
  - 2004 (2A), 2005 (2A), 2021 (3A), 2023 (3A), 2024 (3A)
- Boys' track
  - 1998 (2A), 1999 (2A), 2025 (3A), 2026 (3A)
- Boys' tennis doubles
  - 1957 (B), 1958 (B)

== Academics ==
- UIL Academic Meet Champions
  - 2009 (2A), 2010 (2A), 2015 (3A), 2017 (3A), 2019 (3A), 2021 (3A), 2026 (3A)

== Band ==
- Marching Band State Champions
  - 1993 (2A), 1999 (2A), 2001 (2A)

== Notable alumni ==
- Zach Stewart, baseball player
