= Dads Corner, Texas =

Unincorporated community in Texas

- Unincorporated community
- Location within Texas Location within the United States
- Coordinates: 33.7462110°N 98.6881144°W
- Country: United States
- State: Texas
- County: Archer
- Elevation: 1,027 ft (313 m)
- Time zone: UTC-6 (Central (CST))
  - Summer (DST): UTC-5 (CDT)
- Area code: 940
- GNIS feature ID: 1379630

Dads Corner, also spelled Dad's Corner, is an unincorporated community in Archer County, in the U.S. state of Texas. According to the Handbook of Texas, its population was 20 in the mid-1960s. It is located within the Wichita Falls metropolitan area.

== Geography ==
Dads Corner is located at the intersection of Farm to Market Road 368, Dads Corner Road, and Texas State Highway 25, 12 mi (19 km) northwest of Archer City in north-central Archer County.

== Education ==
Dads Corner once had its own school. Today, the community is served by the Holliday Independent School District.
