= Dundee, Texas =

- Unincorporated community
- Location within the state of Texas Dundee (the United States)
- Coordinates: 33°44′26″N 98°54′6″W
- Country: United States
- State: Texas
- County: Archer
- Elevation: 1,155 ft (352 m)

Population (2010)
  - Total: 12
- Time zone: UTC-6 (Central (CST))
  - Summer (DST): UTC-5 (CDT)
- GNIS feature ID: 1356456

Dundee is an unincorporated community located in Archer County, Texas, United States. According to the Handbook of Texas, the community had a population of 12 in 2010. Dundee is located within the Wichita Falls Metropolitan Statistical Area.

== History ==
Several families were already living in the area when the town was laid out on the T Fork Ranch between 1886 and 1890. In 1890 the Wichita Valley Railway Company established a line between Wichita Falls and Seymour and constructed a three-story hotel at the station the railroad's president is said to have named for Dundee, Scotland. That year, Amanda Giddens built the first post office and became postmistress. In 1892, the town was described as a post office and station on the railway with a population of twenty-five. The railroad brought in more settlers. By 1896, the population was estimated at 199 and Dundee had two livestock dealers, a clothier, a general store, a hardware store, a seller of notions, and a Mr. Biffle who sold organs. The Methodists and Presbyterians organized in the late 1890s, and the Baptists in the early 1900s. Dundee prospered and became for a time the second largest town in Archer County. In 1909, a bank was established with Alex Albright as president. Albright later became well known as the owner of "probably the largest Karakul sheep ranch in the world," just outside Dundee.

By 1919, the town had added some businesses, and the population was about 165. In the 1920s, the population was estimated at 400. The oldest of the county's federated study clubs was founded there in 1921. Lake Kemp was built during the 1920s fifteen miles west and Diversion Lake four miles north, as well as an irrigation system for the northern part of the county. Diversion Lake provided both irrigation and the site for a 141 acres (57 ha) fish hatchery, which was still in operation in 1990. In 1929, a tornado crippled Dundee, which rebuilt most of its businesses, but with the Great Depression, the town's growth was halted. The bank closed in 1933. The number of businesses dropped from ten in 1940 to five in 1946. By 1953, Dundee had an estimated population of 300 and three businesses. In the mid-1960s, the population was seventy-five; by 1970, it was forty, and the town had lost its post office. In 1980, Dundee had no businesses, although the railroad still ran through, and the population was forty. In 1990, the population was still forty but dropped to twelve by 2010. Award-winning Western novelist Benjamin Capps is a native of Dundee.

An Eothyris skull was found a mile west of the former Woodrum ranch house south of the community.

== Geography ==
Dundee is located at the intersection of U.S. Highway 82, U.S. Highway 277, and Farm to Market Road 2846, 25 miles northwest of Archer City and 27 mi (43 km) southwest of Wichita Falls in northwestern Archer County.

=== Climate ===
The climate in this area is characterized by hot, humid summers and generally mild to cool winters. According to the Köppen Climate Classification system, Dundee has a humid subtropical climate, abbreviated "Cfa" on climate maps.

== Education ==
Dundee had its own school in 1891. It is located within the Holliday Independent School District.
