= Holliday Creek (Wichita River tributary) =

Coordinates: 33.92288°N 98.46255°W

- Map

Location
- Country: United States
- State: Texas

Holliday Creek is a stream located in Archer and Wichita counties, Texas. Its headwaters are in western Archer County, Texas. It crosses Archer County and then enters Wichita County and Lake Wichita. From the spillway of Lake Wichita dam, it passes through the city of Wichita Falls, Texas, and empties into the Wichita River, a tributary of the Red River.

A federally funded flood control project was completed about 1998 where the creek passes through Wichita Falls.

== History ==
The creek was named after early explorer, Captain John Holliday, who carved his name on a tree by the creek. The town of Holliday, Texas, was named after the creek, as was Holliday Street, a major street in Wichita Falls.

A flood on Holliday Creek in the 1890s prompted Wichita Falls entrepreneur Joseph A. Kemp to dredge Lake Wichita in 1901 as a reservoir for irrigation and recreation.

== See also ==
- Geology of Wichita Falls, Texas
- List of rivers of Texas
