= Scotland, Texas =

- City
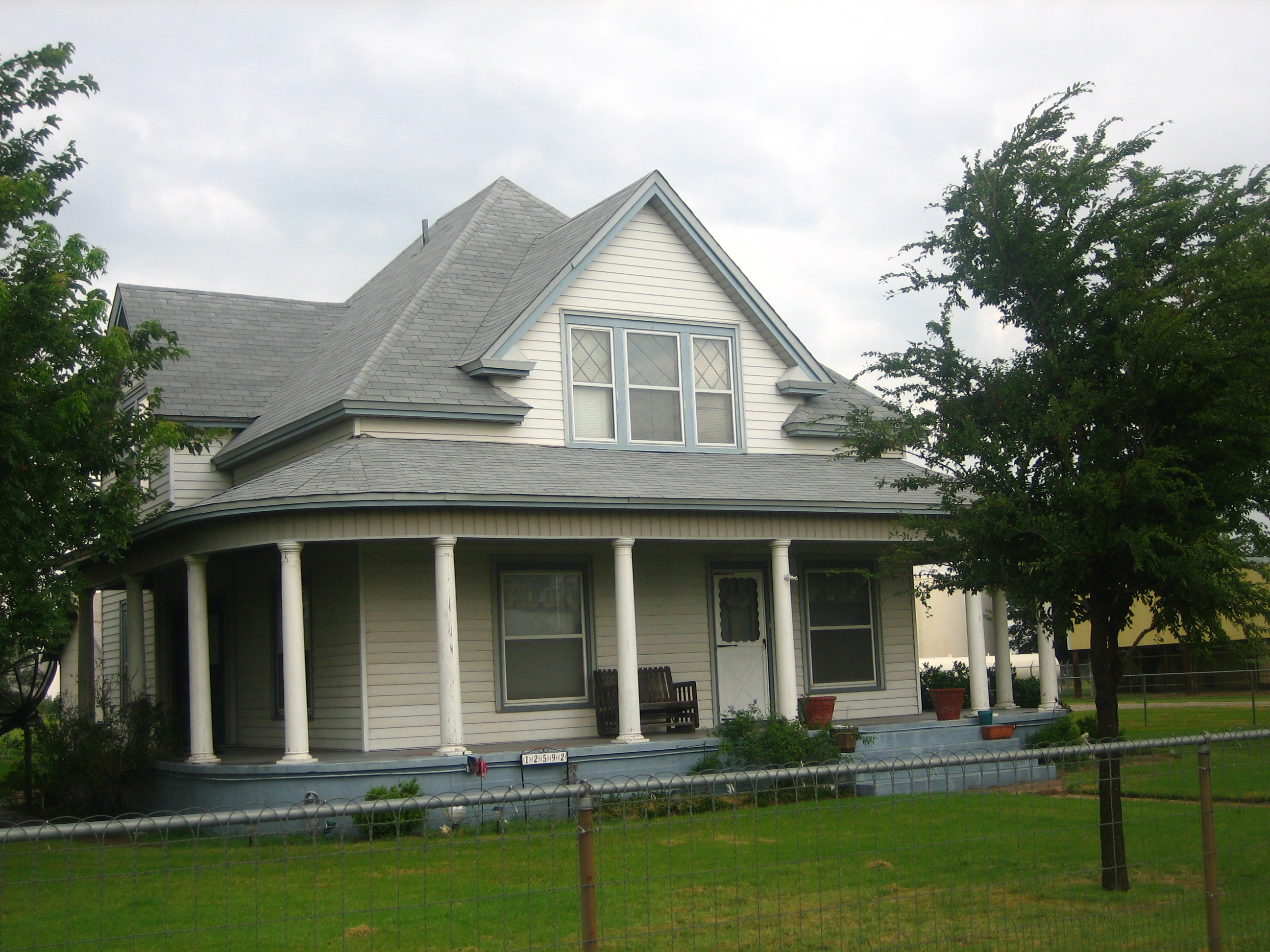
- J.H. Meurer House for Roman Catholic priests

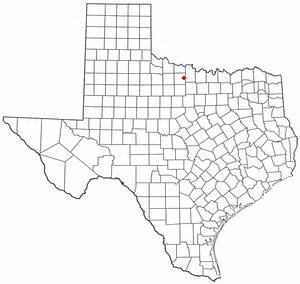
- Location of Scotland, Texas

- Coordinates: 33°38′42″N 98°29′44″W
- Country: United States
- State: Texas
- Counties: Archer

Area
  - Total: 8.02 sq mi (20.78 km^{2})
  - Land: 7.89 sq mi (20.44 km^{2})
  - Water: 0.13 sq mi (0.34 km^{2})
- Elevation: 984 ft (300 m)

Population (2020)
  - Total: 413
  - Density: 52.3/sq mi (20.2/km^{2})
- Time zone: UTC-6 (Central (CST))
  - Summer (DST): UTC-5 (CDT)
- ZIP code: 76379
- Area code: 940
- FIPS code: 48-66284
- GNIS feature ID: 2411842

Scotland is a city in Archer County in the U.S. state of Texas. It is part of the Wichita Falls, Texas Metropolitan Statistical Area. The population was 413 at the 2020 census. The town is named for its founder, Henry J. Scott.

== Geography ==
Scotland is located in eastern Archer County south of the Little Wichita River. The city limits extend east as far as Lake Arrowhead, a reservoir on the Little Wichita. U.S. Route 281 passes through the city, leading north 18 miles (29 km) to Wichita Falls and south 40 miles (64 km) to Jacksboro.

According to the United States Census Bureau, the city has a total area of 8.0 square miles (20.8 km^{2}), of which 7.9 square miles (20.4 km^{2}) is land and 0.12 square miles (0.3 km^{2}), or 1.63%, is water.

=== Climate ===
The climate in this area is characterized by hot, humid summers and generally mild to cool winters. According to the Köppen Climate Classification system, Scotland has a humid subtropical climate, abbreviated "Cfa" on climate maps.

== Demographics ==
Historical population
Census	Pop.	Note	%±
1970	257		—
1980	367		42.8%
1990	490		33.5%
2000	438		−10.6%
2010	501		14.4%
2020	413		−17.6%
U.S. Decennial Census; 2020 Census

=== 2020 census ===
As of the 2020 census, Scotland had a population of 413. The median age was 38.7 years, 24.2% of residents were under the age of 18, and 16.2% of residents were 65 years of age or older. For every 100 females there were 106.5 males, and for every 100 females age 18 and over there were 96.9 males age 18 and over.

0.0% of residents lived in urban areas, while 100.0% lived in rural areas.

There were 161 households in Scotland, of which 34.8% had children under the age of 18 living in them. Of all households, 57.1% were married-couple households, 18.0% were households with a male householder and no spouse or partner present, and 18.0% were households with a female householder and no spouse or partner present. About 15.5% of all households were made up of individuals and 5.6% had someone living alone who was 65 years of age or older.

There were 175 housing units, of which 8.0% were vacant. The homeowner vacancy rate was 2.2% and the rental vacancy rate was 6.3%.

Racial composition as of the 2020 census
Race	Number	Percent
White	316	76.5%
Black or African American	3	0.7%
American Indian and Alaska Native	8	1.9%
Asian	0	0.0%
Native Hawaiian and Other Pacific Islander	0	0.0%
Some other race	58	14.0%
Two or more races	28	6.8%
Hispanic or Latino (of any race)	82	19.9%

=== 2000 census ===
As of the census of 2000, there were 438 people, 160 households, and 116 families residing in the city. The population density was 39.1 inhabitants per square mile (15.1/km^{2}). There were 173 housing units at an average density of 15.4 units per square mile (5.9 units/km^{2}). The racial makeup of the city was 95.21% White, 2.74% from other races, and 2.05% from two or more races. Hispanic or Latino of any race were 8.68% of the population.

There were 160 households, out of which 41.3% had children under the age of 18 living with them, 65.6% were married couples living together, 3.8% had a female householder with no husband present, and 27.5% were non-families. 25.6% of all households were made up of individuals, and 14.4% had someone living alone who was 65 years of age or older. The average household size was 2.74 and the average family size was 3.35.

In the city, the population was spread out, with 33.8% under the age of 18, 5.3% from 18 to 24, 27.4% from 25 to 44, 20.1% from 45 to 64, and 13.5% who were 65 years of age or older. The median age was 34 years. For every 100 females, there were 102.8 males. For every 100 females age 18 and over, there were 104.2 males.

The median income for a household in the city was $37,083, and the median income for a family was $41,667. Males had a median income of $32,045 versus $21,875 for females. The per capita income for the city was $15,406. About 3.0% of families and 3.4% of the population were below the poverty line, including 1.3% of those under age 18 and 12.3% of those age 65 or over.

== Education ==
Scotland is split in half between Windthorst Independent School District and Archer City Independent School District. Small portions belong to the Henrietta Independent School District.
