= Archer City High School =

Location
- 600 South Ash Street; Archer City, Archer County, Texas 76351; United States; 33.5889°N 98.6308°W

Information
- School type: Public, high school
- Locale: Rural: Distant
- School district: Archer City ISD
- NCES School ID: 480861000229
- Principal: Mandy Stafford
- Teaching staff: 24.96 (on an FTE basis)
- Grades: 7–12
- Enrollment: 211 (2023–2024)
- Student to teacher ratio: 8.45
- Colors: Black & Gold
- Athletics conference: UIL Class AA
- Mascot: Wildcats/Lady Wildcats
- Newspaper: Cat's Claw
- Yearbook: Wildcat
- Website: Archer City High School

Archer City High School is a public high school located in Archer City, Texas, United States. It is part of the Archer City Independent School District located in central Archer County and classified as a 2A school by the UIL. During 2023–2024, Archer City High School had an enrollment of 211 students and a student to teacher ratio of 8.45. The school received an overall rating of "A" from the Texas Education Agency for the 2021–2022 school year.

== Athletics ==
The Archer City Wildcats compete in the following sports

- Baseball
- Basketball
- Cross Country
- Football
- Golf
- Softball
- Tennis
- Track and Field
- Volleyball

=== State titles ===
- Baseball -
  - 2007(1A)
- Boys Basketball -
  - 1988(2A)
- Girls Basketball -
  - 2004(1A/DI) Also won Texas Cup.
- Football -
  - 1964(1A)
- Softball -
  - 2001(2A)
