= Windthorst High School =

Location
- 100 St. Mary's Street; Windthorst, Archer County, Texas 76389; United States; 33.574734°N 98.439565°W

Information
- School type: Public, high school
- Locale: Rural: Distant
- School district: Windthorst ISD
- NCES School ID: 482340002375
- Principal: Roy Longcrier
- Staff: 16.52 (on an FTE basis)
- Grades: 9–12
- Enrollment: 140 (2023–2024)
- Student to teacher ratio: 8.47
- Colors: Blue & White
- Athletics conference: UIL Class 2A
- Mascot: Trojans/Trojanettes
- Website: Windthorst High School

Windthorst High School is a public high school located in Windthorst, Texas (USA) and classified as a 2A school by the UIL. It is part of the Windthorst Independent School District located in eastern Archer County. During 2023–2024, Windthorst High School had an enrollment of 140 students and a student to teacher ratio of 8.47. The school received an overall rating of "A" from the Texas Education Agency for the 2021–2022 school year.

== Athletics ==
The Windthorst Trojans compete in the following sports

- Baseball
- Basketball
- Cross Country
- Football
- Golf
- Softball
- Tennis
- Track and Field
- Volleyball

=== State Titles ===
- Baseball
  - 2010(1A)
- Boys Cross Country
  - 2025(2A)
- Football
  - 1996(1A), 2003(1A), 2020(2A/D2)
- Softball
  - 2004(1A), 2005(1A)
- Volleyball
  - 1992(1A), 1993(1A), 1994(1A), 1997(1A), 1998(1A), 1999(1A), 2000(1A), 2001(1A), 2002(1A), 2004(1A), 2005(1A), 2007(1A), 2008(1A), 2022(2A)
