= National Register of Historic Places listings in Archer County, Texas =

Location of Archer County in Texas

This is a list of the National Register of Historic Places listings in Archer County, Texas.

This is intended to be a complete list of properties listed on the National Register of Historic Places in Archer County, Texas. There is one property listed on the National Register in the county. This property is a State Antiquities Landmark and includes two Recorded Texas Historic Landmarks.

This National Park Service list is complete through NPS recent listings posted March 21, 2025.

== Current listings ==
The locations of National Register properties may be seen in a mapping service provided.

	Name on the Register	Image	Date listed	Location	City or town	Description
1	Archer County Courthouse and Jail	Archer County Courthouse and Jail	December 23, 1977 (#77001424)	Public Sq. and Sycamore and Pecan Sts. 33°35′42″N 98°37′31″W	Archer City	State Antiquities Landmark, includes two Recorded Texas Historic Landmarks; Romanesque Revival design. Constructed in 1891-1892.

== See also ==
- National Register of Historic Places listings in Texas
- Recorded Texas Historic Landmarks in Archer County
