= Geology and hydrology of the Wichita Falls, Texas area =

The exposed strata at the surface in and around Wichita Falls are the products of one ancient period of deposition with a modest amount of recent and modern alteration. In all cases, the strata are products of terrigenous (non-marine) environments dominated by fluvial depositional and erosional systems (rivers and streams).

== Brief geologic history ==
The rocks found in and around Wichita Falls result from southwesterly-flowing Permian streams that deposited sands in channels and silts and clays on the surrounding floodplains. Calcium-carbonate rich soils concurrently developed adjacent to these streams. These were likely buried by further Permian sedimentation and then lithified. Pleistocene erosion removed the younger rocks, exposing the current strata. Exposures of sediments indicate that northeast-flowing streams locally deposited silts, clays, sands, and some gravels on the Permian rocks. These are subsequently modified by modern (Holocene) stream erosion and deposition.

== Permian Rocks ==
In the Permian geologic period, North-Central Texas was a part of the western coastal zone of equatorial Pangea, a super-continental land mass. Nearby uplifts and mountainous regions, such as the Muenster Arch and Red River Uplift, the Wichita, Arbuckle, and Ouachita mountains developed by the end of the Pennsylvanian, providing elevated topography to the north and east during the Permian. The rocks of the Permian Basin of West Texas record a contemporaneous shallow inland sea. The resulting topography provided northeast-to-southwest gradients for stream flow and sediment movement. The sediments deposited by the Permian streams of North-Central Texas were likely reworked clastic materials from Middle Pennsylvanian stream and fan-delta sediments proximal to the Ouachita foldbelt and Muenster Highlands.

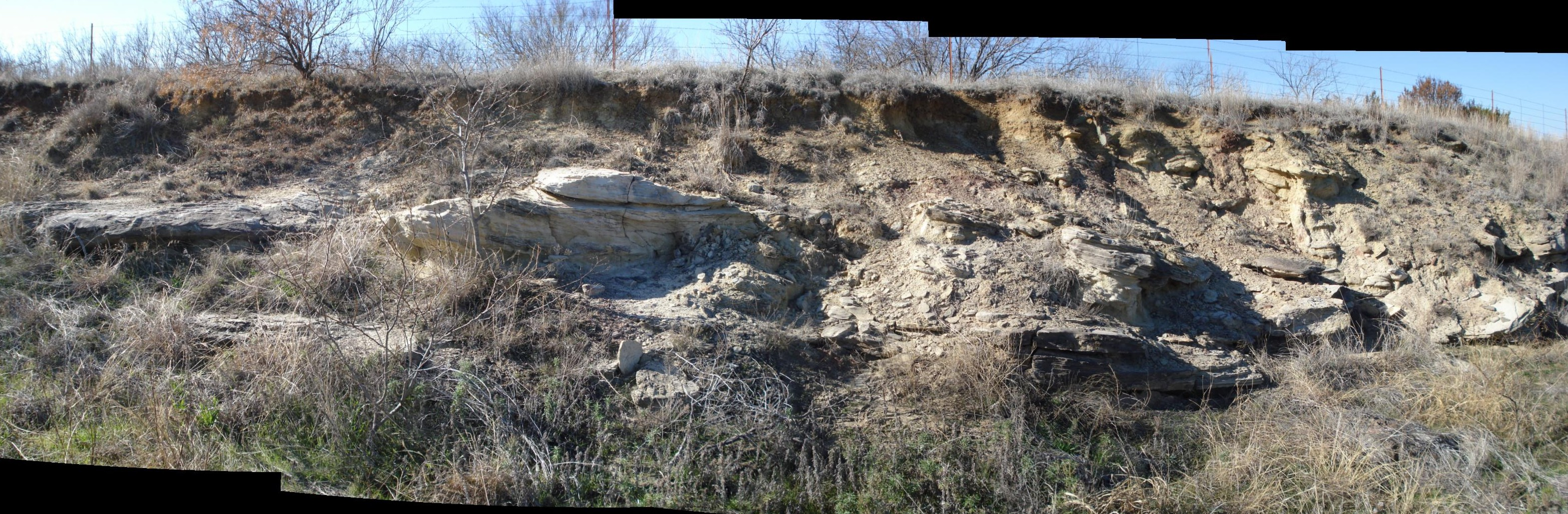
Sandstone channel in mudstone as exposed along Wiley Road, west of Wichita Falls. The buff-colored rock preserves numerous fluvial sedimentary structures.

The Petrolia Formation (of the Late Wolfcampian-Leonardian systems) dominates the exposed Permian strata in Wichita falls, as mapped by the 1987 Texas Atlas of Geology. The map describes the formation as 360–400 feet of weakly or unstratified mudstone with laminated, cross-bedded sandstone lenses. The formation increases in mudstone content upsection. Sandstone lenses contain terrestrial fossils of plants, vertebrates, and footprints. The unit contains calcareous nodules of varying sizes as well as poorly indurated "conglomerate" with vertebrate fossils. In general the entire package is only weakly lithified, perhaps indicating that the region was not appreciably covered by a thick package of younger strata.

Several correlated sandstone units crop out in the immediate region. These dominate the region adjacent to the Seymour Highway, on the slopes to the south of the Wichita River (locally known as "the bluffs"). The Texas Atlas of Geology mapped these as ss6. Most outcrops are buff-colored, medium-grained, well-sorted quartzose sandstones. These exhibit extensive cross-bedding and soft-sediment deformation features. Some deposits are friable, others well cemented. Locally, there appears to be three prominent layers of sandstone separated by mudstone. Because of variable erosion rates, each influences topography by forming ledges and benches, and in places may form mesa-like landforms. In and around the city, these occur roughly at 960, 1000, and 1060 feet above sea level.

== Pleistocene and/or early Holocene Sediments ==
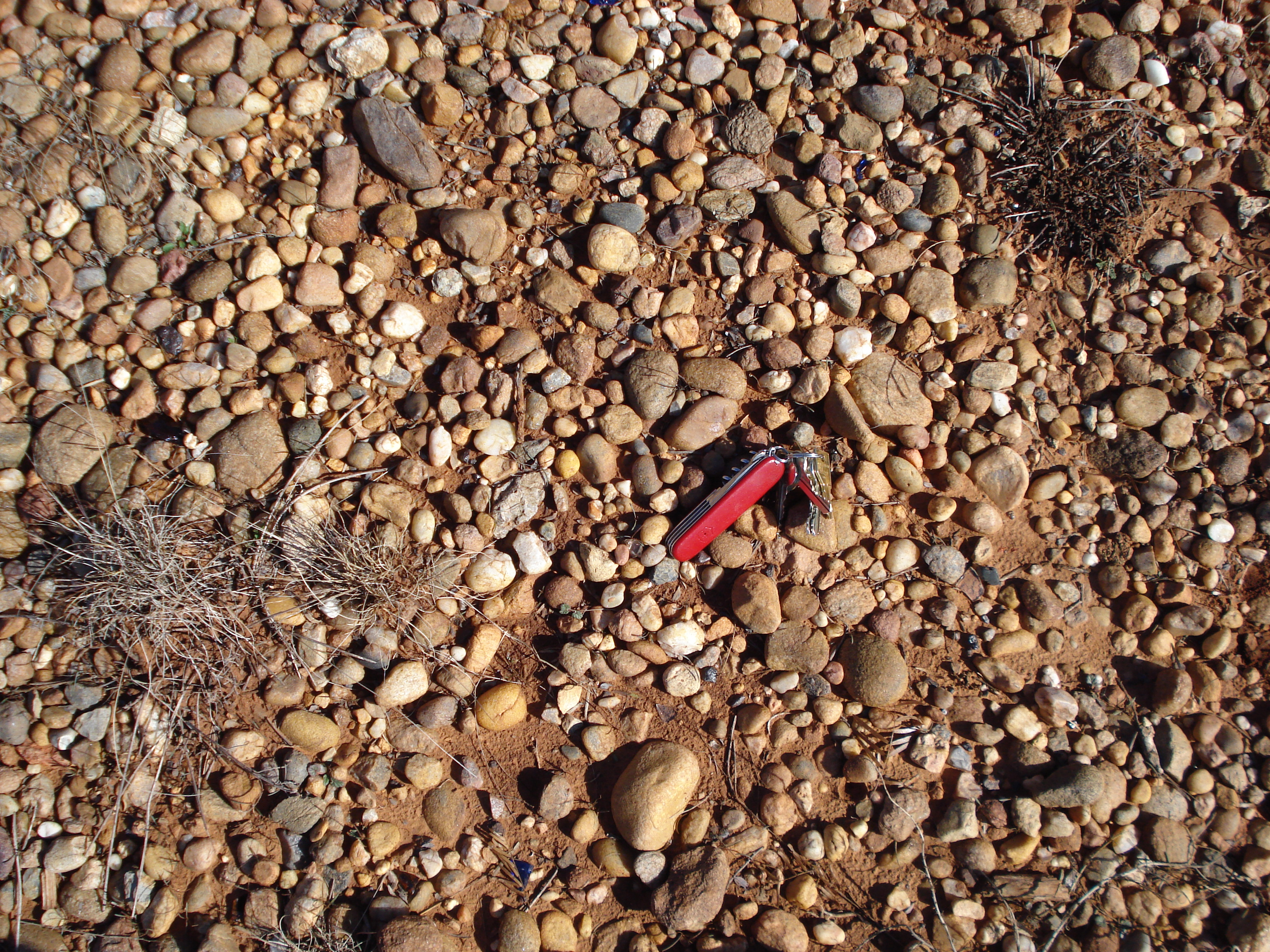
Pleistocene and/or early Holocene quartzite and other hard-stone gravels on soil surface.

Up to 30 feet (9.1 m) of fluvial deposits of unconsolidated gravel, sand, and silt mapped as terrace deposition by the 1987 Texas Atlas of Geology. Gravels are granule-to-cobble size, with clasts of angular to well-rounded quartzite, quartz, and chert from distal sources and lesser fragments of local strata. The sands are orange-brown to tan, fine- to coarse-grained with preserved soils.

== Holocene Sediments ==
Up to 30 feet (9.1 m) of floodplain and channel sand, silt, clay, and gravel from the modern stream systems. This includes terrace deposits near floodplain, colluvium on valley slopes, and local wind-blown sand and silt.

== Structural Geology ==
The region is largely underlain with shallowly west-dipping strata, but a significant uplifted block is found in the subsurface immediately north of Wichita Falls. This block, locally known as the Red River uplift, may be part of an uplifted system that extends eastward, joining the Muenster Arch. The uplifts offset Pennsylvanian and older strata in the subsurface and are thought to be contemporaneous with the Ouachita and Ancestral Rocky Orogenies. These Pennsylvanian orogenies resulted from the closure of the Iapetus ocean as the Gondwana and Laurentia continents collided to form Pangea.

== Oil and Gas Resources ==
Petroleum resources were discovered in the region in the early 1900s, and the area remains a locus of exploration and production.

== Water Resources ==
=== Groundwater ===
Groundwater in Wichita Falls is drawn from the Seymour aquifer or from alluvial aquifers associated with local streams. Groundwater withdrawals are limited to individual property owners and do not feed into the municipal supply for the city of Wichita Falls. However, the nearby city of Burkburnett, located 15 miles (24 km) north of (and down hydraulic gradient from) Wichita Falls relies in part on this aquifer for municipal supply.

The Seymour aquifer may be locally confined under clay-rich soils and sediments. In the southern part of the city, the distribution and nature of the aquifer is consistent with one hosted by Pleistocene and/or Holocene fluvial channel deposits. The depth to water (hydrostatic head) averages 14 feet (4.3 m) below the surface, closely correlated with topography. The water is likely sourced in coarse sands and gravels 10 to 19 feet (3.0 to 5.8 m) below the surface. Dry holes in this same area contain no typically sand-gravel layers within the first 22 feet (6.7 m). The horizontal distribution of this shallow aquifer is irregular; dry holes may be adjacent to those with water yields.

==== Cedar Springs Pools ====
Seymour aquifer groundwater once fed the Cedar Springs Pools, a popular recreational public swimming facility in the 1930s and 40s. The two pools were located between Taft Boulevard and Robin Lane north of Hampstead Rd. in the southern part of Wichita Falls. Long-time residents have vivid memoirs of the frigid waters in these ponds.

=== Surface water ===
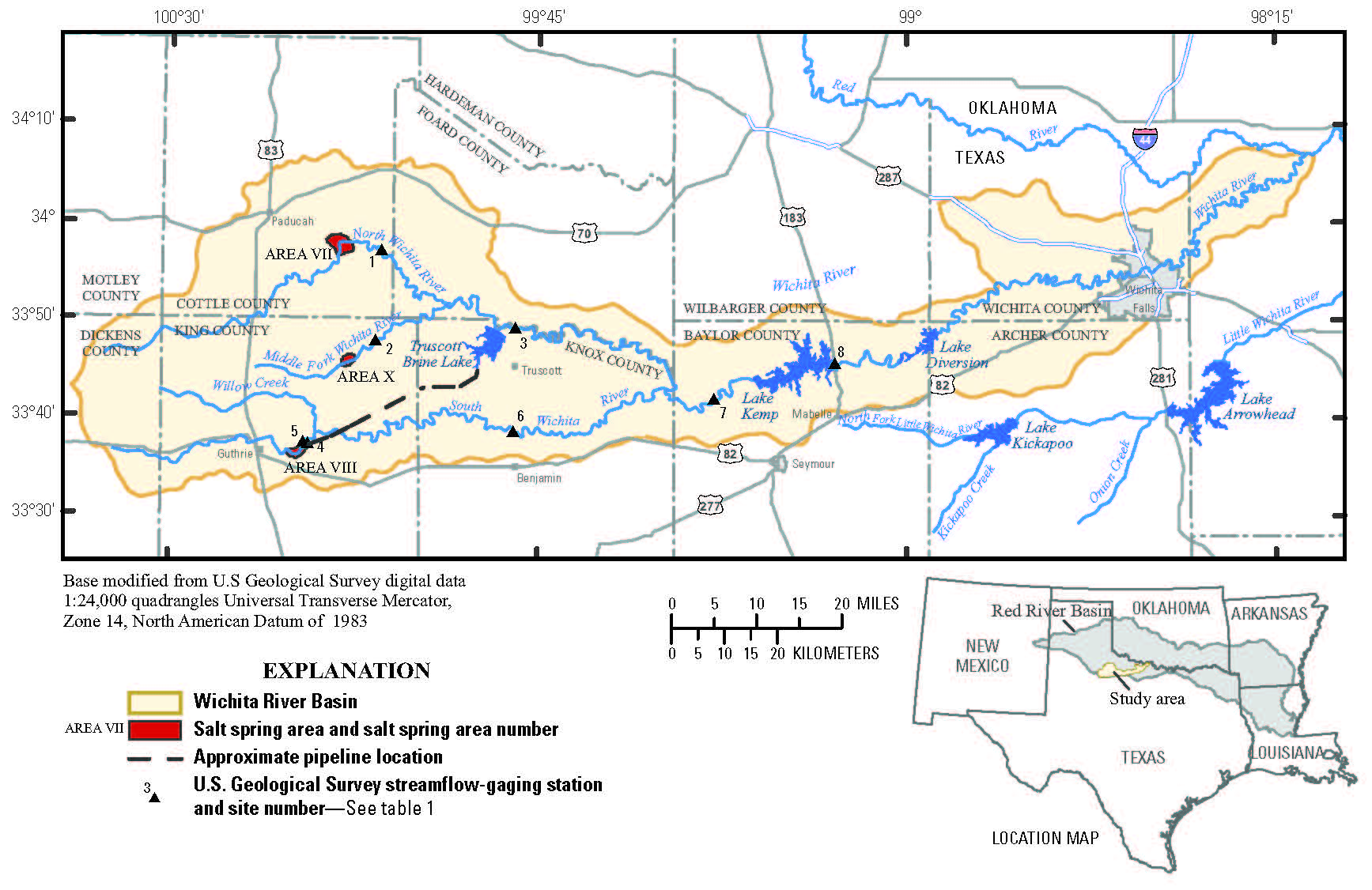
Wichita River watershed and adjacent streams and lakes

==== The Wichita River ====
Wichita Falls is located along the Wichita River roughly 25 miles (40 km) southwest of its confluence with the Red River. The river essentially bisects the city into north and south. The river exhibits many of the classic morphological features associated with meandering streams; Lucy Park, an expansive city green space, occupies a large meander bend near downtown and the Tanglewood subdivision surrounds an oxbow lake. The upstream waters of the Wichita River are impounded for flood control and reservoir capacity.

===== Lake Diversion =====
Lake Diversion was impounded in 1924 in northwest Archer and northeast Baylor counties, 71 miles (114 km) upstream from Wichita Falls. Lake Diversion sits at an elevation of 1,053 feet (321 m) above sea level, has a surface area of 3,133 acres (12.68 km^{2}), and a maximum depth of 35 feet (11 m). The lake serves to alleviate flooding, and a source of water for the Dundee fish hatchery, and as an irrigation source, feeding a 135 miles (217 km) network of irrigation canals that extend to the east side of Wichita Falls (Wichita County Water Improvement District #2).

===== Lake Kemp =====
Located 8 miles (13 km) north of Seymour in Baylor County and 40 miles (64 km) upstream of Wichita Falls, Lake Kemp was developed in 1924 to alleviate persistent flooding issues downstream and to provide irrigation and drinking water for the city and the adjacent farming areas. The elevation of Lake Kemp is 1,142 feet (348 m) asl and contains 245,308 acre-feet (79.934×10^{9} US gal; 0.302583 km^{3}) at its maximum capacity. The lake has 100 miles (160 km) of shoreline, some of which is used for housing and recreation.

Lake Kemp was used as a source of drinking water through the 1950s but lost popularity because of its gypsum taste. In 2008, the City of Wichita Falls began reverse osmosis water treatment and is now processing water from Lake Kemp through this desalination system Additionally, Lake Kemp provides water to the American Electric Power Company in Oklaunion, Texas. Lake Kemp is named for entrepreneur Joseph A. Kemp.

Lake Kemp is the location where the Internet viral video titled "Failed Dock Jump Attempt" was filmed. This video was featured on G4tv's Attack of the Show

===== Truscott Brine Lake =====
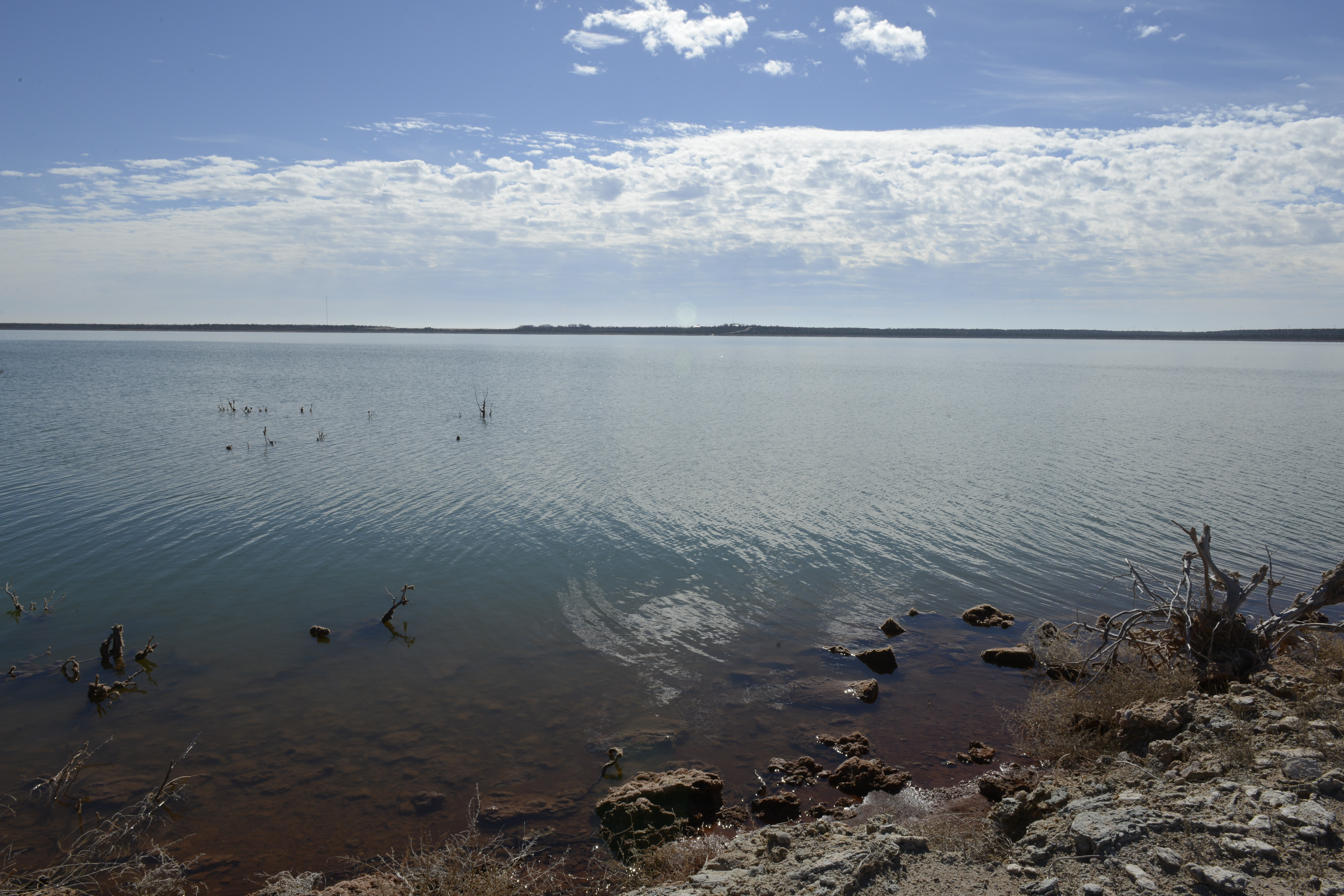
Truscott Brine Lake

Truscott Brine Lake was completed in 1987 by the Army Corps of Engineers, Tulsa District. The lake covers a surface area of 3,146 acres (12.73 km^{2}) with 24 miles (39 km) of shoreline. The lake has a normal storage of 107,000 acre-feet (132,000,000 m^{3}), a maximum capacity of 116,200 acre-feet (143,300,000 m^{3}) of water with a maximum discharge rate of 35,400 cubic feet per second (1,000 m^{3}/s). The lake drains a 26 square metres (280 sq ft) area.

This project is aimed at controlling chloride and other salinity components in the Wichita River watershed. There are naturally occurring salt springs in the area. The salt springs result from the percolation of groundwater through Permian strata rich in evaporite minerals.

Authorized in 1974, and completed in 1987, a 5 feet (1.5 m) tall inflatable collection dam was constructed across the South Wichita River near Guthrie, Texas. During low flow periods, this salty water is piped 23 miles (37 km) to Truscott Brine Lake, where the water is contained for eventual evaporation. An additional low-water inflatable dam has been installed on the Middle Fork of the Wichita River, but a pipeline to Truscott Lake has not yet been completed.

==== Holliday Creek ====
Holliday Creek is a tributary to the Wichita River that originates south of Dundee in Archer County, Texas, to the north edge of Wichita Falls. It is impounded at the southern edge of Wichita Falls to form Lake Wichita.

===== Lake Wichita =====
Located on the southern edge of the city limits, partly in Wichita County and partly in Archer County, this lake at 971 feet above sea level was developed in 1901 by the entrepreneur Frank Kell, his brother-in-law Joseph Kemp, and the Lake Wichita Irrigation and Water Company to alleviate flooding and provide irrigation water for local farms and municipal water for Wichita Falls. The lake is recharged from the Holliday Creek watershed and from irrigation conduits from Lake Diversion. The original lake covered 2,200 acres (890 ha) with a maximum capacity of 14,000 acre-feet (17,000,000 m^{3}) of water. In 1995, the city constructed a new spillway that was 4.7 feet (1.4 m) lower than the previous spillway. as part a flood control project on Holliday Creek. The current lake now covers 1,224 acres (495 ha) to a maximum depth of 8 feet (2.4 m) at its deepest spot. Because of its shallow nature, this lake is currently only used for recreation and not as a municipal reservoir.

==== The Little Wichita River ====
The Little Wichita River is a near-parallel drainage system to the south of Wichita River and a tributary to the Red River, emptying into the Red about 20 miles (32 km) downstream of the Wichita River. The Little Wichita River drains the regions to the south and east of the Wichita Falls city limits, and its waters are impounded in two lakes that feed the Wichita Falls municipal water system.

===== Lake Arrowhead =====
This lower lake in the Little Wichita River watershed is located 15 miles (24 km) southeast of Wichita Falls on the western edge of Clay County. The most recently built of the region's large reservoirs, it was impounded in 1965 following a prolonged legal battle and the eventual relocation of the residents (living and deceased) of Halsell, Texas. It has a drainage area of 832 square miles (2,150 km^{2}), a maximum capacity of 228,000 acre-feet (74×10^{9} US gal; 0.281 km^{3}), and sits at 926 feet (282 m) above sea level Wichita Falls is authorized by the Texas Water Development Board to utilize up to 45,000 acre-feet (56,000,000 m^{3}) of water annually for municipal purposes

===== Lake Kickapoo =====
This upper lake on the Little Wichita River watershed is located approximately 18 miles (29 km) southwest of Wichita Falls, in Archer County. Constructed in 1945, the lake is at an elevation of 1,014 feet (309 m) above sea level, has a surface area of 6,200 acres (25 km^{2}), and has a maximum capacity of 106,000 acre-feet (35×10^{9} US gal; 0.131 km^{3}).

===== Lake Ringgold =====
Lake Ringgold is a proposed reservoir site on the Little Wichita River near the city of Henrietta with a potential of 27,000 acre-feet (33,000,000 m^{3}) per year by 2050 to provide 77,003 acre-feet (94,982,000 m^{3}) of additional water storage by the year 2060. The total capital costs to develop this additional water resource are $383 million.
