= Archer County Courthouse and Jail =

- U.S. National Register of Historic Places
- Texas State Antiquities Landmark
- Recorded Texas Historic Landmark
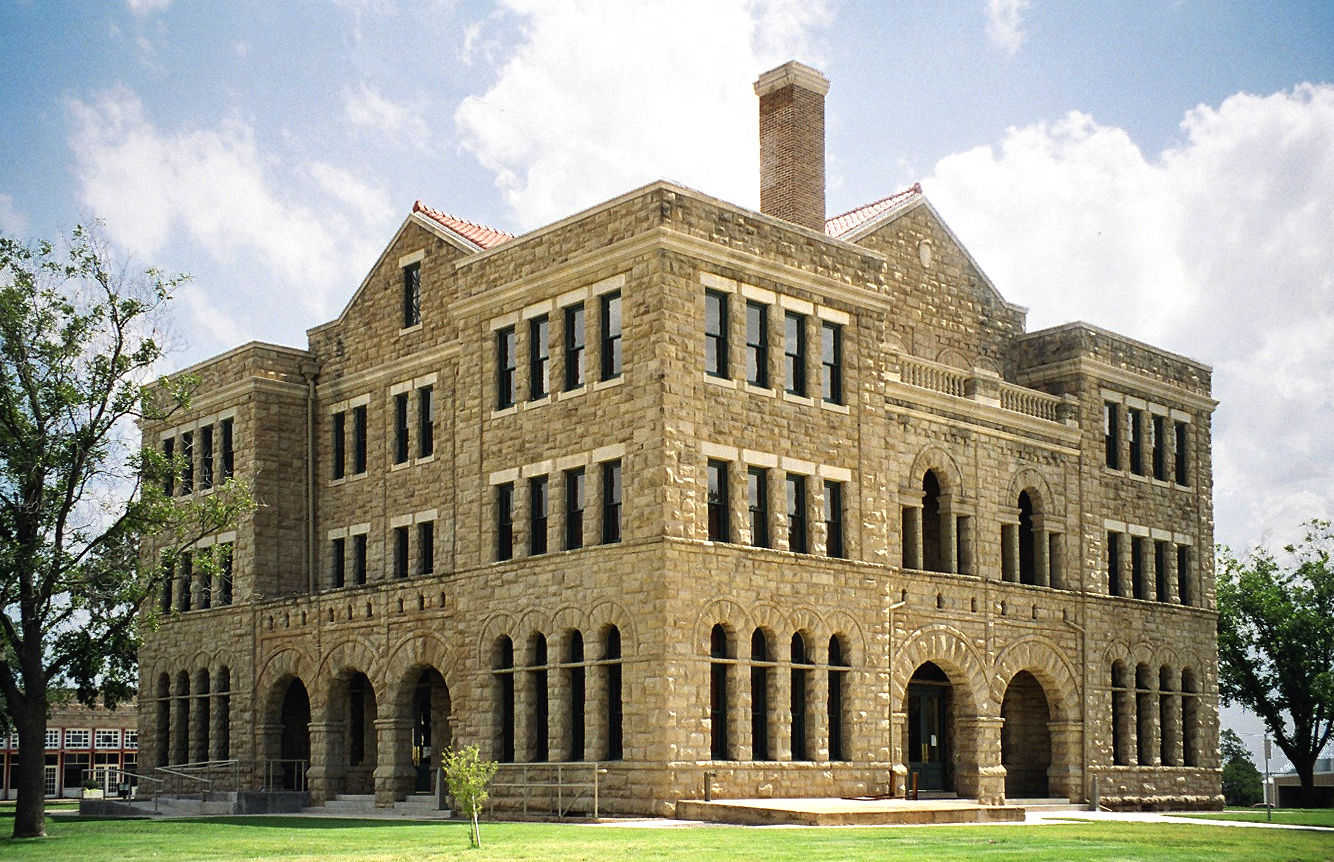

- Location within Texas Location within the United States
- Interactive map showing the location of Archer County Courthouse and Jail
- Location: Public Sq. and Sycamore and Pecan Sts., Archer City, Texas
- Coordinates: 33°35′42″N 98°37′31″W
- Area: 4 acres (1.6 ha)
- Built: 1891-92
- Architect: Alonzo N. Dawson
- Architectural style: Romanesque Revival
- NRHP reference No.: 77001424
- TSAL No.: 8200000020
- RTHL No.: 191

Significant dates
- Added to NRHP: December 23, 1977
- Designated TSAL: May 28, 1981
- Designated RTHL: 1963

The Archer County Courthouse and Jail is a historic courthouse building on Public Square and Sycamore and Pecan Streets in Archer City, Texas.

Archer County was organized in 1880. The Romanesque style courthouse was built during 1891-92 and replaced a wooden courthouse from 1880. An architectural design competition was held, and the Romanesque Revival-style design of architect Alonzo N. Dawson of Fort Worth was chosen out of 25 submissions.

The contract amount for construction was $32,500. The exterior walls of the courthouse are of brown sandstone obtained from a nearby quarry. Originally, the building was two-story and rising from the center of the courthouse was a massive octagonal tower, with four clock faces, terminated with a cupola. The tower was removed in 1928 and a third floor was added.

The jail, a block north of the courthouse, was built in 1910.

The courthouse and jail were added to the National Register of Historic Places in 1977.

== See also ==
- National Register of Historic Places listings in Archer County, Texas
- Recorded Texas Historic Landmarks in Archer County
- List of county courthouses in Texas

== Bibliography ==
- Kelsey, Mavis P, Sr.; Dyal, Donald H. (1993). The Courthouses of Texas. College Station, TX: Texas A&M University Press. ISBN 0-89096-546-3.
