= Windthorst, Texas =

Town in Archer and Clay counties in Texas, United States

- Town
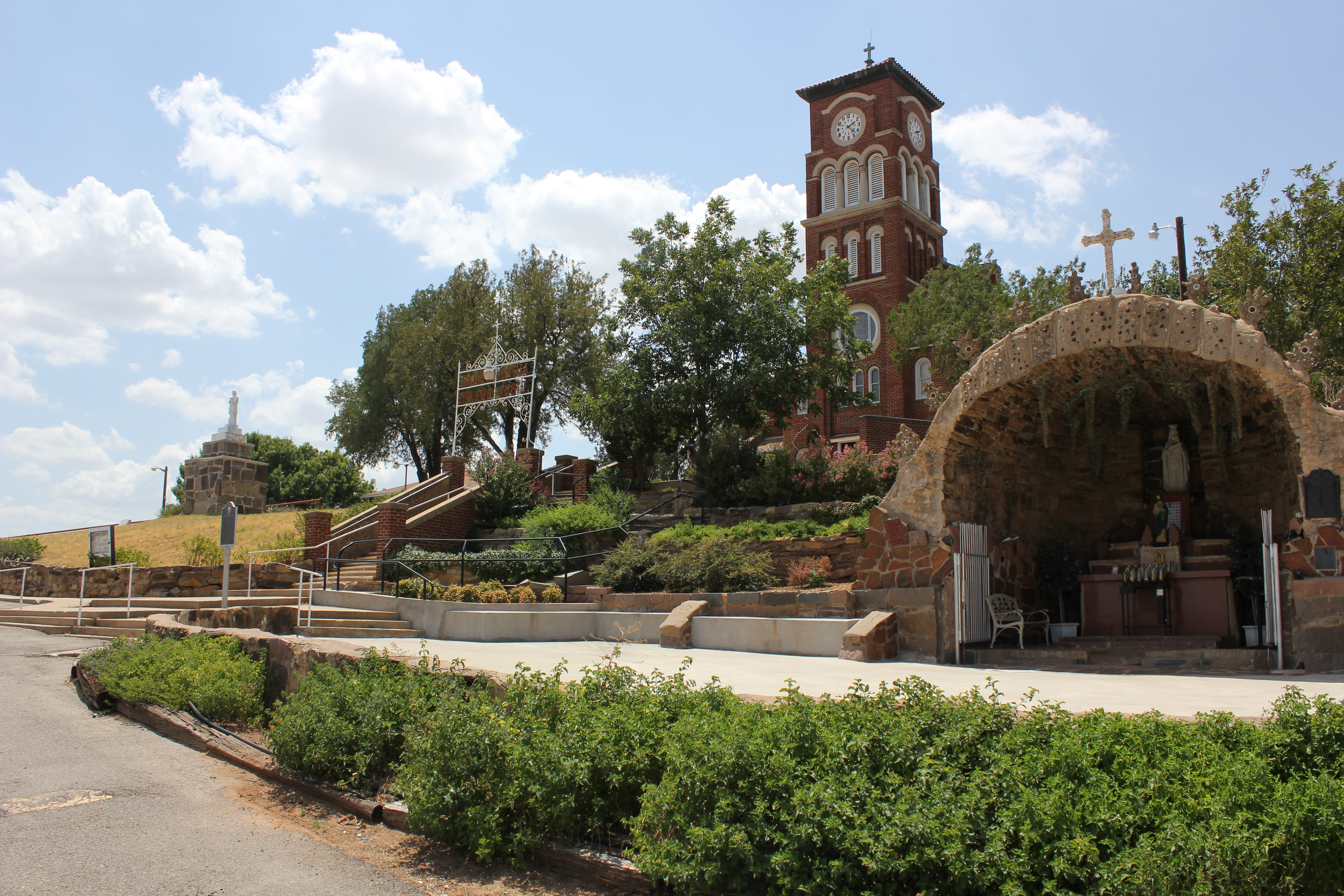
- St. Mary's Catholic Church, August 2012

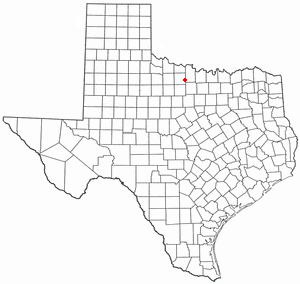
- Location of Windthorst, Texas

- Coordinates: 33°35′N 98°26′W
- Country: United States
- State: Texas
- Counties: Archer, Clay

Area
  - Total: 2.56 sq mi (6.64 km^{2})
  - Land: 2.50 sq mi (6.48 km^{2})
  - Water: 0.062 sq mi (0.16 km^{2})
- Elevation: 1,034 ft (315 m)

Population (2020)
  - Total: 342
  - Density: 137/sq mi (52.8/km^{2})
- Time zone: UTC-6 (Central (CST))
  - Summer (DST): UTC-5 (CDT)
- ZIP code: 76389
- Area code: 940
- FIPS code: 48-79696
- GNIS feature ID: 2413497

Windthorst is a town in Archer and Clay counties in Texas, United States. It is part of the Wichita Falls, Texas Metropolitan Statistical Area. The population was 342 at the 2020 census. The town is named for Ludwig Windthorst, a Catholic statesman in Germany.

Windthorst is the home of the St. Mary's Grotto, a Roman Catholic outdoor shrine, which was paid for with money sent home by 64 military service members from Windthorst who served in World War II. All of the 64 returned home. A new entrance to the shrine was constructed in 2009.

== Geography ==
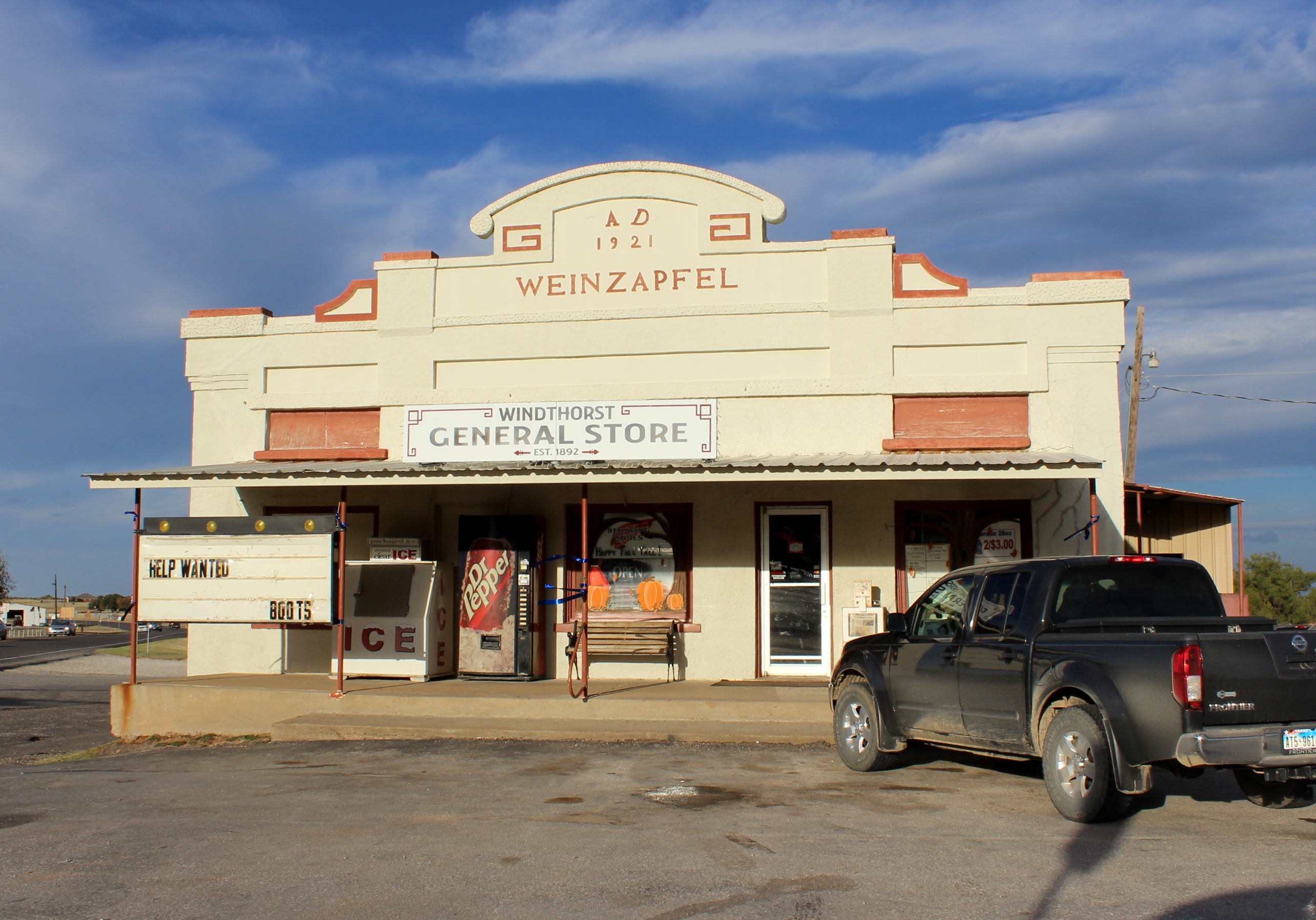
Windthorst General Store (established c. 1921)

Windthorst is located in northern Texas, primarily in eastern Archer County but extending eastward into Clay County. U.S. Route 281 passes through the center of the town, leading north 25 miles (40 km) to Wichita Falls and southeast 33 miles (53 km) to Jacksboro. Texas State Highway 25 leads west from the center of Windthorst 11 miles (18 km) to Archer City, the Archer County seat.

According to the U.S. Census Bureau, Windthorst has a total area of 2.5 square miles (6.6 km^{2}), of which 2.5 square miles (6.5 km^{2}) is land and 0.077 square miles (0.2 km^{2}), or 2.35%, is water.

== Demographics ==
Historical population
Census	Pop.	Note	%±
1970	377		—
1980	409		8.5%
1990	367		−10.3%
2000	440		19.9%
2010	409		−7.0%
2020	342		−16.4%
U.S. Decennial Census; 2020 Census

As of the census of 2000, there were 509 people, 154 households, and 119 families residing in the town. The population density was 175.9 inhabitants per square mile (67.9/km^{2}). There were 162 housing units at an average density of 64.8 units per square mile (25.0 units/km^{2}). The racial makeup of the town was 83.86% White, 0.23% Native American, 14.09% from other races, and 1.82% from two or more races. 23.41% of the population were Hispanic or Latino of any race.

There were 154 households, out of which 40.9% had children under the age of 18 living with them, 71.4% were married couples living together, 1.9% had a female householder with no husband present, and 22.7% were non-families. 21.4% of all households were made up of individuals, and 9.7% had someone living alone who was 65 years of age or older. The average household size was 2.86 and the average family size was 3.34.

In the town, the population was spread out, with 31.8% under the age of 18, 7.7% from 18 to 24, 28.4% from 25 to 44, 18.6% from 45 to 64, and 13.4% who were 65 years of age or older. The median age was 32 years. For every 100 females, there were 111.5 males. For every 100 females age 18 and over, there were 106.9 males.

The median income for a household in the town was $37,708, and the median income for a family was $45,000. Males had a median income of $30,833 versus $17,917 for females. The per capita income for the town was $16,146. About 6.5% of families and 8.0% of the population were below the poverty line, including 8.3% of those under age 18 and 10.1% of those age 65 or over.

== Education ==
Windthorst is served by the Windthorst Independent School District. Windthorst High School is a University Interscholastic League Class A school in education and sports. The school has won state championships in volleyball, football, baseball, softball, and track; its most recent championship is the 2020 Class 2A-D2 Football State Championship.

== Notable person ==
- Hank Gremminger, American football player who played on three title-winning teams for the Green Bay Packers during the 1960s

== See also ==
- List of municipalities in Texas
