= Wichita River =

Coordinates: 33°43′N 99°29′W

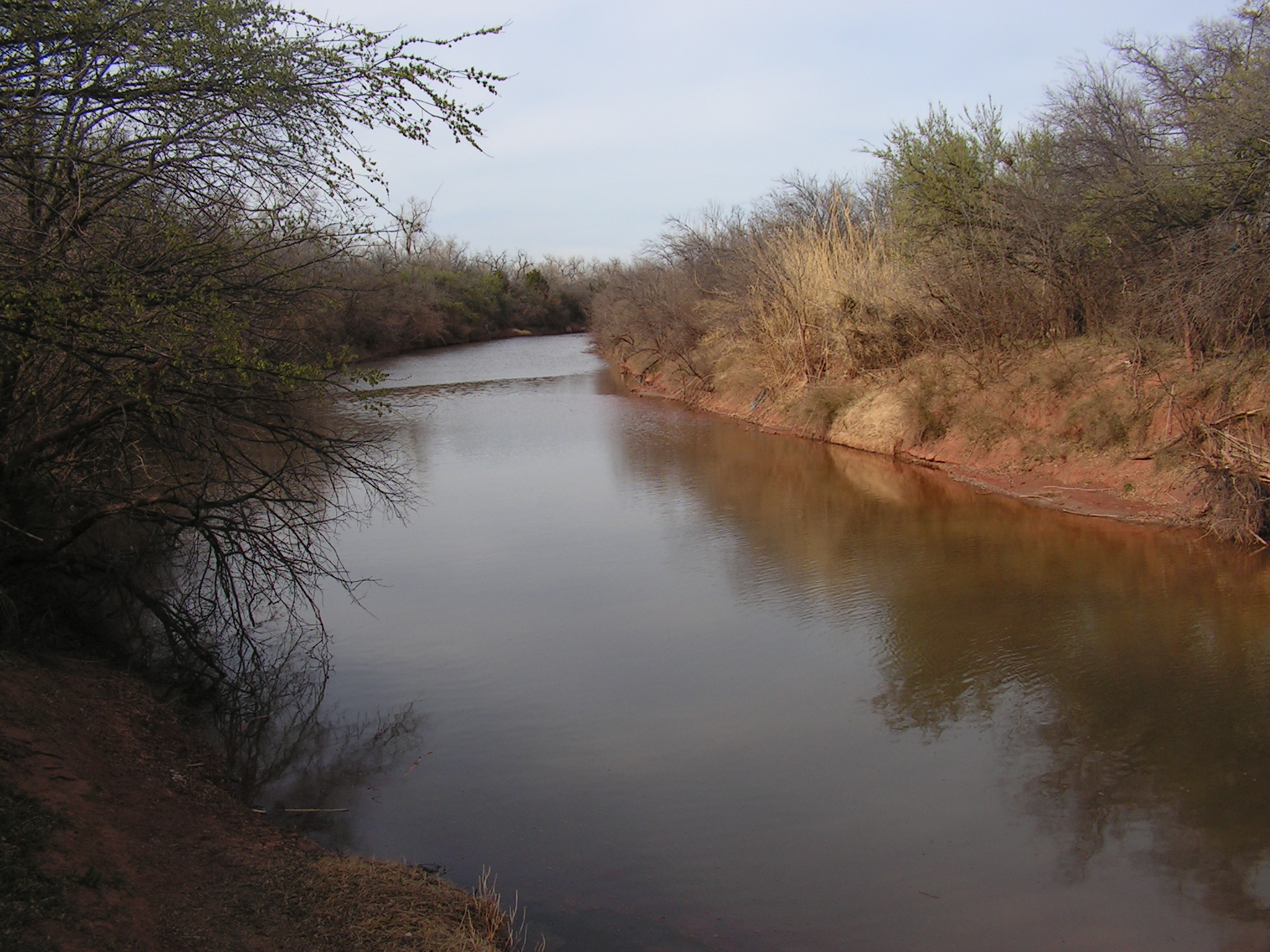
- The Wichita River, as seen from Lucy Park in Wichita Falls, Texas
- Map

Location
- Country: United States

The Wichita River (/ˈwɪtʃɪtɔː/ WITCH-i-taw) is a river of Northwest Texas that is part of the Red River watershed. Rising in northeastern Knox County at the confluence of its North and South Forks, the river flows 90 miles (140 km) northeast across Baylor, Archer, Wichita, and Clay counties before joining the Red River just west of Byers Bend in northern Clay County.

The Texan Santa Fe Expedition crossed the river at the site of present-day Wichita Falls in 1841 and found a large Wichita Indian village at the site; the river was later named after the tribe. The largest human settlement on the river is the city of Wichita Falls, which was named after a five-foot waterfall on the river that later washed away in a flood in 1886. The city after nearly 100 years of visitors wanting to visit the non-existent falls built an artificial waterfall beside the river in Lucy Park. The recreated falls are 54 feet (16 m) high and recirculate at 3,500 gallons per minute. They are visible to south-bound traffic on Interstate 44.

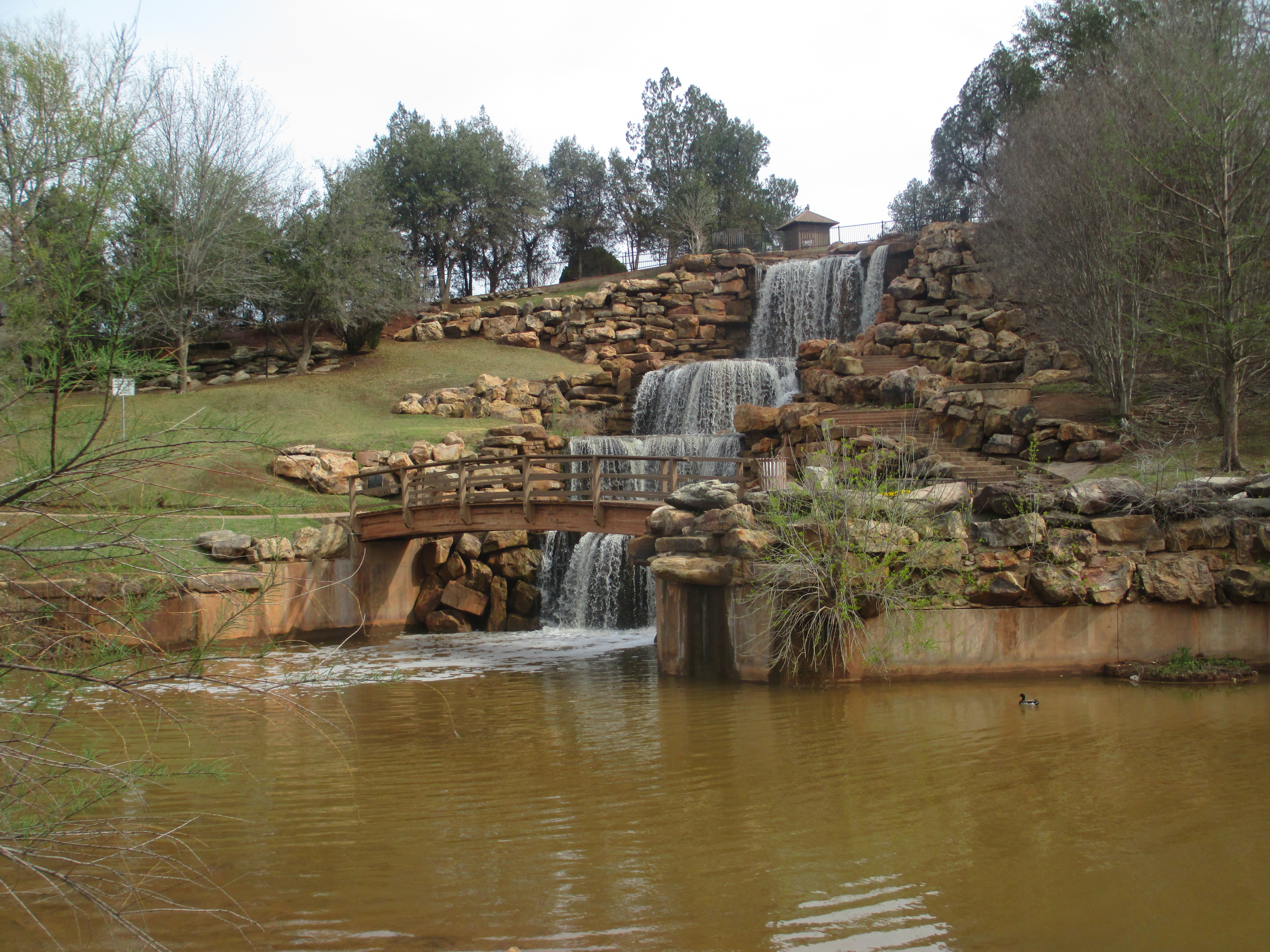
The restored "Falls" of the Wichita River in Lucy Park, Wichita Falls, Texas, off Interstate 44.

The river is dammed in Archer County, forming Lake Diversion, and in Baylor County, forming Lake Kemp; there are also two small reservoirs on the river in Wichita County, one furnishing water for the town of Iowa Park and the other providing water for local irrigation.

The Wichita River has three tributaries; the Wichita proper, as stated above, is formed by the confluence of its North and South Forks. The North Fork runs for 100 miles (160 km) from northeastern Dickens County through King, Cottle, and Foard counties before joining the South Fork. The Middle Fork flows 35 miles (56 km) from north-central King County to its meeting with the North Fork in southwestern Foard County. The South Fork rises in eastern Dickens County and runs for 100 miles (160 km) through King and Knox Counties before joining the North Fork; the King County seat of Guthrie lies on the South Fork.

== See also ==
- Geology of Wichita Falls, Texas
- List of rivers of Texas
