= Archer City Independent School District =

School district in Texas, United States

Location
- 600 S Ash; Archer City, Texas ESC Region 9 USA
- Coordinates: 33°35′21″N 98°37′51″W

District information
- Type: Public Independent school district
- Grades: EE through 12
- Superintendent: C.D. Knobloch
- Schools: 2 (2011-12)
- NCES District ID: 4808610

Students and staff
- Students: 488 (2012-13)
- Teachers: 51.12 (2011-12) (on full-time equivalent (FTE) basis)
- Student–teacher ratio: 9.76 (2011-12)
- Athletic conference: UIL Class 1A Football Division I
- District mascot: Wildcats
- Colors: Vegas Gold, Black, White

Other information
- TEA District Accountability Rating for 2011-12: Recognized
- Website: Archer City ISD

Archer City Independent School District is a public school district based in Archer City, Texas, United States. Archer City ISD serves much of Archer County, including Archer City and most of the city of Scotland.

== Finances ==
As of the 2010–2011 school year, the appraised valuation of property in the district was $174,509,000. The maintenance tax rate was $0.102 and the bond tax rate was $0.008 per $100 of appraised valuation.

== Academic achievement ==
In 2011, the school district was rated "recognized" by the Texas Education Agency.

Historical district TEA accountability ratings

- 2011: Recognized
- 2010: Recognized
- 2009: Recognized
- 2008: Recognized
- 2007: Recognized
- 2006: Recognized
- 2005: Recognized
- 2004: Recognized

== Schools ==
In the 2012–2013 school year, the district had students in two schools.

- Archer City High School (grades 7-12)
- Archer City Elementary School (early childhood education-grade 6)

== Special programs ==
=== Athletics ===
Archer City High School participates in the boys' sports of baseball, basketball, and football,and the girls' sports of basketball, softball, and volleyball. For the 2012 through 2014 school years, Archer City High School played football in UIL Class 2A Division II.

== See also ==
- List of school districts in Texas
- List of high schools in Texas
