= Maurice Benton Ball =

American politician (1924–1994)

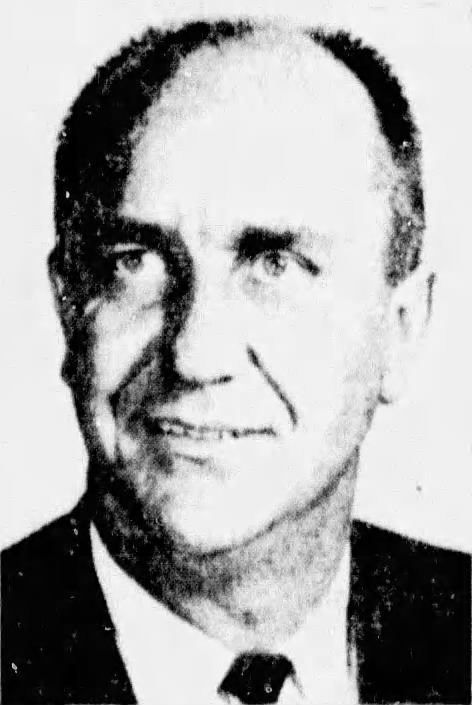

Member of the Texas House of Representatives from the 51-4 district
- In office January 8, 1963 – January 12, 1965
- Preceded by: District established
- Succeeded by: John Field

Personal details
- Born: November 10, 1924 Wichita Falls, Texas, U.S.
- Died: April 7, 1994 (aged 69) Dallas, Texas, U.S.
- Party: Republican
- Spouse: Audrey Dorine Nelson
- Children: 4
- Education: Southern Methodist University

Military service
- Branch/service: United States Navy
- Battles/wars: World War II; Pacific Theater

Maurice Benton Ball (November 10, 1924 – April 7, 1994) was an American politician who served in the Texas House of Representatives from 1963 to 1965.

Ball was born on November 10, 1924, in Wichita Falls, Texas. He was raised in Archer City, Texas. He attended Burkburnett High School and graduated in 1942. That same year, he enlisted in the United States Navy and served in the Pacific Theater. After the war, he attended Southern Methodist University and graduated in 1948 with a degree in business administration. He later joined the real estate and construction industries. In 1962, he was elected as a Republican representing Dallas County.

He died on April 7, 1994, aged 69, at his home in Dallas. He was survived by his wife, Audrey Dorine Nelson, and four children.
