= Lake Wichita =

Reservoir in Texas, United States

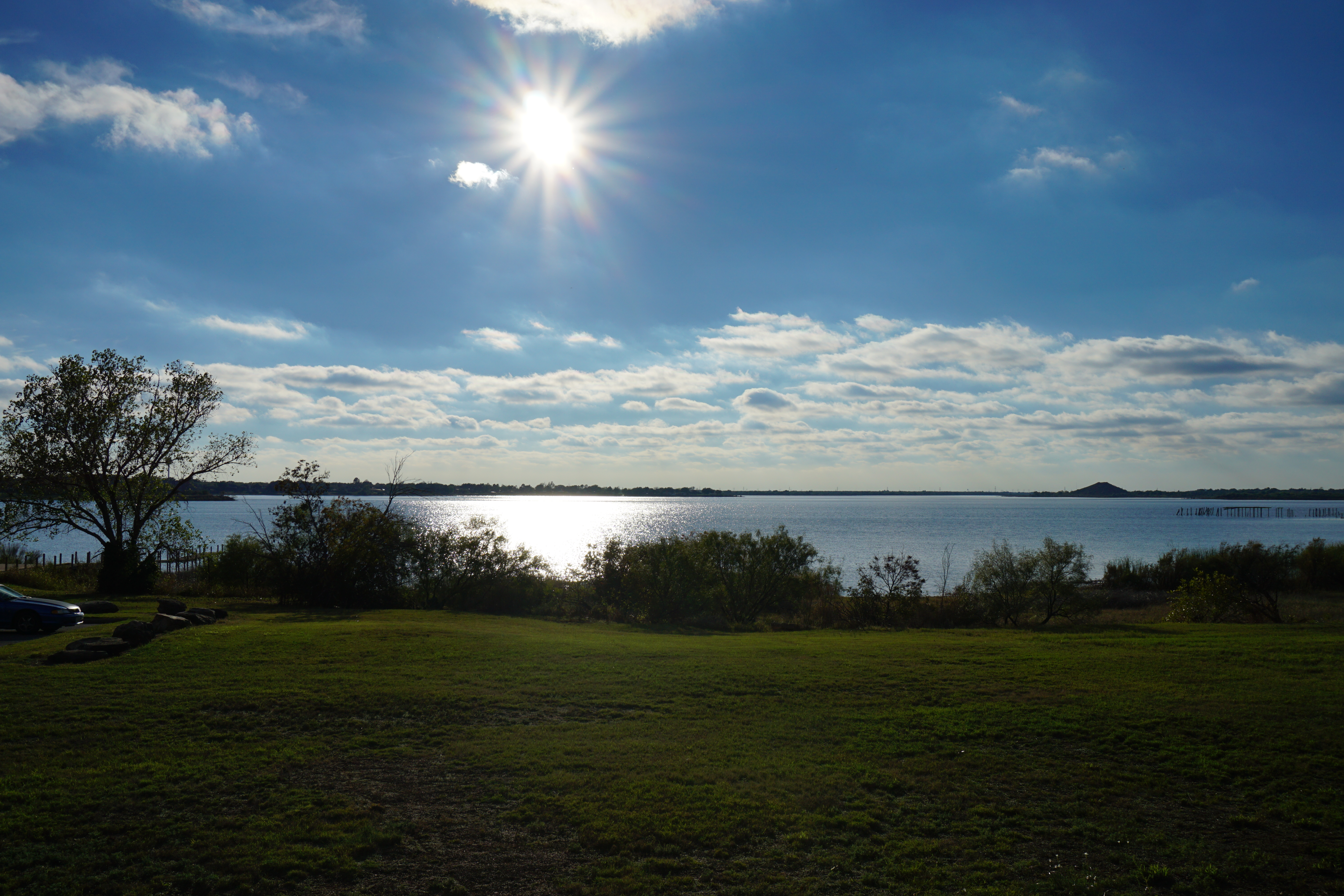
- Lake Wichita

- Location within Texas
- Interactive map of Lake Wichita
- Location: Wichita Falls, Texas
- Coordinates: 33°50′06.09″N 98°33′20.8″W
- Type: Artificial lake
- Part of: Lake Wichita Park
- River sources: Holliday Creek
- Basin countries: United States
- First flooded: 1901
- Surface area: 2,200 acres (8.9 km^{2})
- Max. depth: 9.5 feet (2.9 m)
- Water volume: 14,000 acre-feet (17,000,000 m^{3})
- Surface elevation: 3,186 ft (971 m)
- References: GNIS

Lake Wichita is a lake located south of Wichita Falls, Texas. The town of Lakeside City is situated on the southern shore.

== Lake Wichita Park ==
Lake Wichita Park, a 234 acres (95 ha) park is situated on the northern shores.
