= Windthorst Independent School District =

School district in Texas

Coordinates: 33°34′24″N 98°26′22″W

Location
- Windthorst, TX ESC Region 9 USA

District information
- Type: Public Independent school district
- Motto: Home of Champions
- Grades: EE through 12
- Superintendent: Lonny Hise
- Schools: 3 (2011-12)
- NCES District ID: 4846080

Students and staff
- Students: 476 (2012-13)
- Teachers: 37.44 (2011-12) (on full-time equivalent (FTE) basis)
- Student–teacher ratio: 12.58 (2011-12)
- Athletic conference: UIL Class A
- District mascot: Trojan
- Colors: Blue and White

Other information
- Website: Windthorst ISD

Windthorst Independent School District is a public school district based in Windthorst, Texas, USA. Located in Archer County, the district extends into a portion of Clay County. In 2009, the school district was rated "recognized" by the Texas Education Agency.

== Schools ==
In the 2012–2013 school year, the district had students in three schools.

- Windthorst High School (Grades 9-12)
- Windthorst Junior High (Grades 6-8)
- Windthorst Elementary (Grades EE-5)

== Athletics ==
Windthorst High School is among the state's most dominant programs in volleyball. The Trojanettes participated in the UIL state final for every year since 1991 (until 2009 when the streak finally ended) and were in the Class A championship game in all but two of those years, including a 12-year stretch from 1997–2008. The school has 13 state titles in volleyball (1992, 1993, 1994, 1997, 1998, 1999, 2000, 2001, 2002, 2004, 2005, 2007, 2008, and 2022), the most of any Class A program and tied with East Barnard for the most in any classification. They dominate the contest in any sport and have many great athletes to come. The Trojans made state appearances in 2006 and 2010 but fell short both years.

In addition, Windthorst also won the 1996, 2003, and 2020 Class AA state football championships.
