= Holliday, Texas =

- City
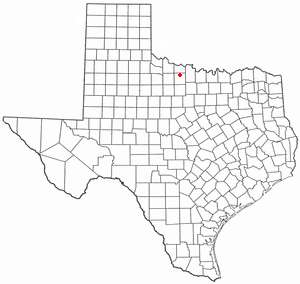
- Location of Holliday, Texas

- Coordinates: 33°48′52″N 98°41′23″W
- Country: United States
- State: Texas
- County: Archer

Area
  - Total: 2.44 sq mi (6.33 km^{2})
  - Land: 2.44 sq mi (6.33 km^{2})
  - Water: 0 sq mi (0.00 km^{2})
- Elevation: 1,053 ft (321 m)

Population (2020)
  - Total: 1,524
  - Density: 624/sq mi (241/km^{2})
- Time zone: UTC-6 (Central (CST))
  - Summer (DST): UTC-5 (CDT)
- ZIP code: 76366
- Area code: 940
- FIPS code: 48-34532
- GNIS feature ID: 2410776
- Website: hollidaytx.gov

Holliday is a city in Archer County, Texas, United States. It is part of the Wichita Falls, Texas Metropolitan Statistical Area. The population was 1,524 at the 2020 census, down from 1,758 at the 2010 census. The town is named for nearby Holliday Creek, named in turn for John Holliday, a member of a Republic of Texas military expedition.

== Geography ==
Holliday is located in northern Archer County 14 miles (23 km) southwest of downtown Wichita Falls in northern Texas. U.S. Routes 82 and 277 bypass the city on the northwest, leading northeast to Wichita Falls and southwest to Seymour.

According to the United States Census Bureau, the city has a total area of 2.4 square miles (6.2 km^{2}), all land.

== Demographics ==
Historical population
Census	Pop.	Note	%±
1930	786		—
1940	798		1.5%
1950	1,007		26.2%
1960	1,139		13.1%
1970	1,048		−8.0%
1980	1,349		28.7%
1990	1,475		9.3%
2000	1,632		10.6%
2010	1,758		7.7%
2020	1,524		−13.3%
U.S. Decennial Census

=== 2020 census ===
As of the 2020 census, Holliday had a population of 1,524, 605 households, and 465 families residing in the city. The median age was 40.9 years, 24.4% of residents were under the age of 18, and 17.0% of residents were 65 years of age or older; for every 100 females there were 92.2 males, and for every 100 females age 18 and over there were 92.0 males age 18 and over.

As of the 2020 census, 0.0% of residents lived in urban areas, while 100.0% lived in rural areas.

As of the 2020 census, there were 605 households in Holliday, of which 34.4% had children under the age of 18 living in them. Of all households, 51.4% were married-couple households, 17.4% were households with a male householder and no spouse or partner present, and 26.6% were households with a female householder and no spouse or partner present. About 25.7% of all households were made up of individuals and 13.4% had someone living alone who was 65 years of age or older.

As of the 2020 census, there were 677 housing units, of which 10.6% were vacant. The homeowner vacancy rate was 0.9% and the rental vacancy rate was 6.6%.

Racial composition as of the 2020 census
Race	Number	Percent
White	1,395	91.5%
Black or African American	1	0.1%
American Indian and Alaska Native	17	1.1%
Asian	3	0.2%
Native Hawaiian and Other Pacific Islander	0	0.0%
Some other race	16	1.0%
Two or more races	92	6.0%
Hispanic or Latino (of any race)	79	5.2%

== Education ==
Holliday is served by the Holliday Independent School District.

== Climate ==
The climate in this area is characterized by hot, humid summers and generally mild to cool winters. According to the Köppen climate classification system, Holliday has a humid subtropical climate, Cfa on climate maps.
