= Holliday Independent School District =

School district in Texas

Address
- 751 College Ave Holliday, Texas ESC Region 9 76366; United States
- Coordinates: 33.8084°N 98.6897°W

District information
- Type: Public Independent school district
- Grades: PK–12
- Superintendent: Cody Carroll
- Schools: 3
- NCES District ID: 4823400

Students and staff
- Students: 1,132 (2023–24)
- Teachers: 90.0 ((on an FTE basis))
- Staff: 153.53 (on an FTE basis)
- Student–teacher ratio: 12.58

Other information
- Website: hollidayisd.net

Holliday Independent School District is a public school district based in Holliday, Texas, United States.

Located in Archer County, a small portion of the district extends into Wichita County. Besides Holliday, the only other sizeable town in the district is Lakeside City.

In 2009, the school district was rated "recognized" by the Texas Education Agency.

In 2023, the school ranked fourth in a state contest for the marching band with the theme, "Out with a Bang". In the 2023–2024, year Holliday won the Lone Star Cup.

== Schools ==
In the 2023–2024 school year, the district had students in three schools:

- Holliday High School (grades 9–12)
- Holliday Middle School (grades 6–8)
- Holliday Elementary School (prekindergarten-grade 5)
