= Archer City, Texas =

- City
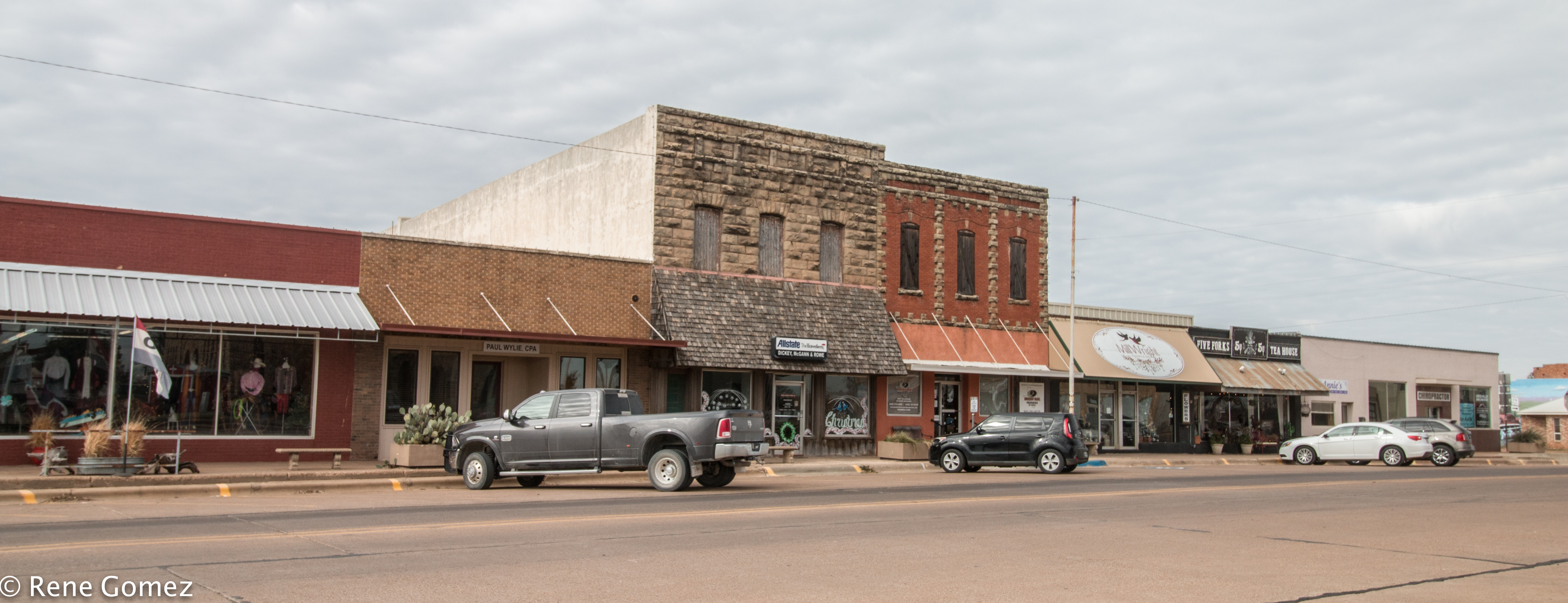
- Downtown Archer City, Texas
- Interactive map of Archer City, Texas
- Location in Texas Location in the United States
- Coordinates: 33°35′35″N 98°37′25″W
- Country: United States
- State: Texas
- County: Archer

Area
  - Total: 2.22 sq mi (5.76 km^{2})
  - Land: 2.19 sq mi (5.68 km^{2})
  - Water: 0.031 sq mi (0.08 km^{2})
- Elevation: 1,070 ft (330 m)

Population (2020)
  - Total: 1,601
  - Density: 730/sq mi (282/km^{2})
- Time zone: UTC-6 (Central (CST))
  - Summer (DST): UTC-5 (CDT)
- ZIP code: 76351
- Area code: 940
- FIPS code: 48-03696
- GNIS feature ID: 2409724
- Website: www.archercity.org

Archer City is a city in and the county seat of Archer County, Texas, United States. The city lies at the junction of State Highway 79 and State Highway 25. It is located 25 miles (40 km) south of Wichita Falls, and is part of the Wichita Falls metropolitan statistical area. Its population was 1,601 at the 2020 census. Archer City is notable as a filming location for the motion picture The Last Picture Show (1971) and its sequel Texasville (1990), both based upon novels written by Archer City native Larry McMurtry.

The city is named for Branch Tanner Archer, a commissioner for the Republic of Texas.

== Geography ==
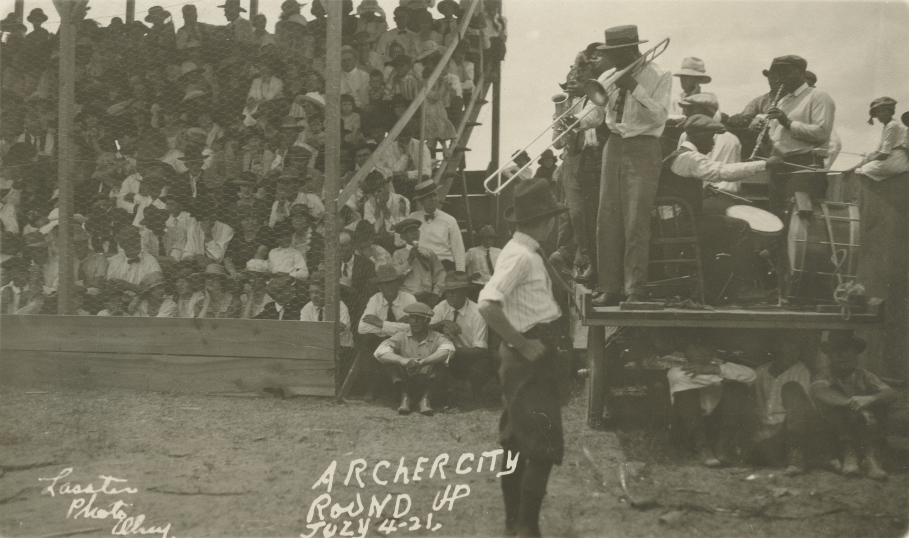
Archer City Round Up, July 4, 1921

According to the United States Census Bureau, the city has a total area of 2.2 sq mi (5.7 km^{2}), of which 0.04 sq mi (0.10 km^{2}) is covered by water.

=== Climate ===
The climate in this area is characterized as very hot, with humid summers and generally mild to cool winters. According to the Köppen climate classification, Archer City has a humid subtropical climate, Cfa on climate maps.

== Demographics ==
Historical population
Census	Pop.	Note	%±
1910	825		—
1920	689		−16.5%
1930	1,512		119.4%
1940	1,675		10.8%
1950	1,901		13.5%
1960	1,974		3.8%
1970	1,722		−12.8%
1980	1,862		8.1%
1990	1,748		−6.1%
2000	1,848		5.7%
2010	1,834		−0.8%
2020	1,601		−12.7%
U.S. Decennial Census

=== 2020 census ===
As of the 2020 census, Archer City had 1,601 people, 679 households, and 340 families residing in the city. The median age was 42.5 years, 23.4% of residents were under the age of 18, and 20.8% of residents were 65 years of age or older. For every 100 females there were 91.5 males, and for every 100 females age 18 and over there were 87.7 males age 18 and over.

0% of residents lived in urban areas, while 100.0% lived in rural areas.

There were 679 households in Archer City, of which 30.2% had children under the age of 18 living in them. Of all households, 46.4% were married-couple households, 17.2% were households with a male householder and no spouse or partner present, and 31.5% were households with a female householder and no spouse or partner present. About 34.9% of all households were made up of individuals and 18.1% had someone living alone who was 65 years of age or older.

There were 795 housing units, of which 14.6% were vacant. Among occupied housing units, 75.0% were owner-occupied and 25.0% were renter-occupied. The homeowner vacancy rate was 1.5% and the rental vacancy rate was 19.4%.

Racial composition as of the 2020 census
Race	Percent
White	89.0%
Black or African American	0.9%
American Indian and Alaska Native	1.2%
Asian	0.1%
Native Hawaiian and Other Pacific Islander	0%
Some other race	1.7%
Two or more races	7.1%
Hispanic or Latino (of any race)	7.3%

== Government and infrastructure ==
Kelvin Green was elected mayor of Archer City in 2014 at the age of 18. He ran unopposed and was in high school. He was re-elected in 2017.

Eight miles (12.8 km) west-southwest of the city lies a 2-mile (3.2 km) antenna, the Lake Kickapoo Field Station, operated by the 20th Space Control Squadron, and part of the Air Force Space Surveillance System, used for observing objects passing over the United States. It is the primary anchor transmitter for the Space Command southern "fence" (or "Space Fence") network for monitoring the space defense system. It extends east-to-west across America at about 33°N. The antenna has no public access and restricted entry.

== Education ==
Archer City is served by the Archer City Independent School District, with one campus consisting of Archer City High School (grades 7–12) and Archer City Elementary School (grades K–6).

== Notable people ==
- Maurice Benton Ball, served in the Texas House of Representatives 1963–1965.
- Angela Kinsey, actress, in The Office, lived in Archer City as a teenager
- Larry McMurtry, novelist and screenwriter
- Graham B. Purcell, Jr., U.S. representative from Texas's 13th congressional district

== Gallery ==
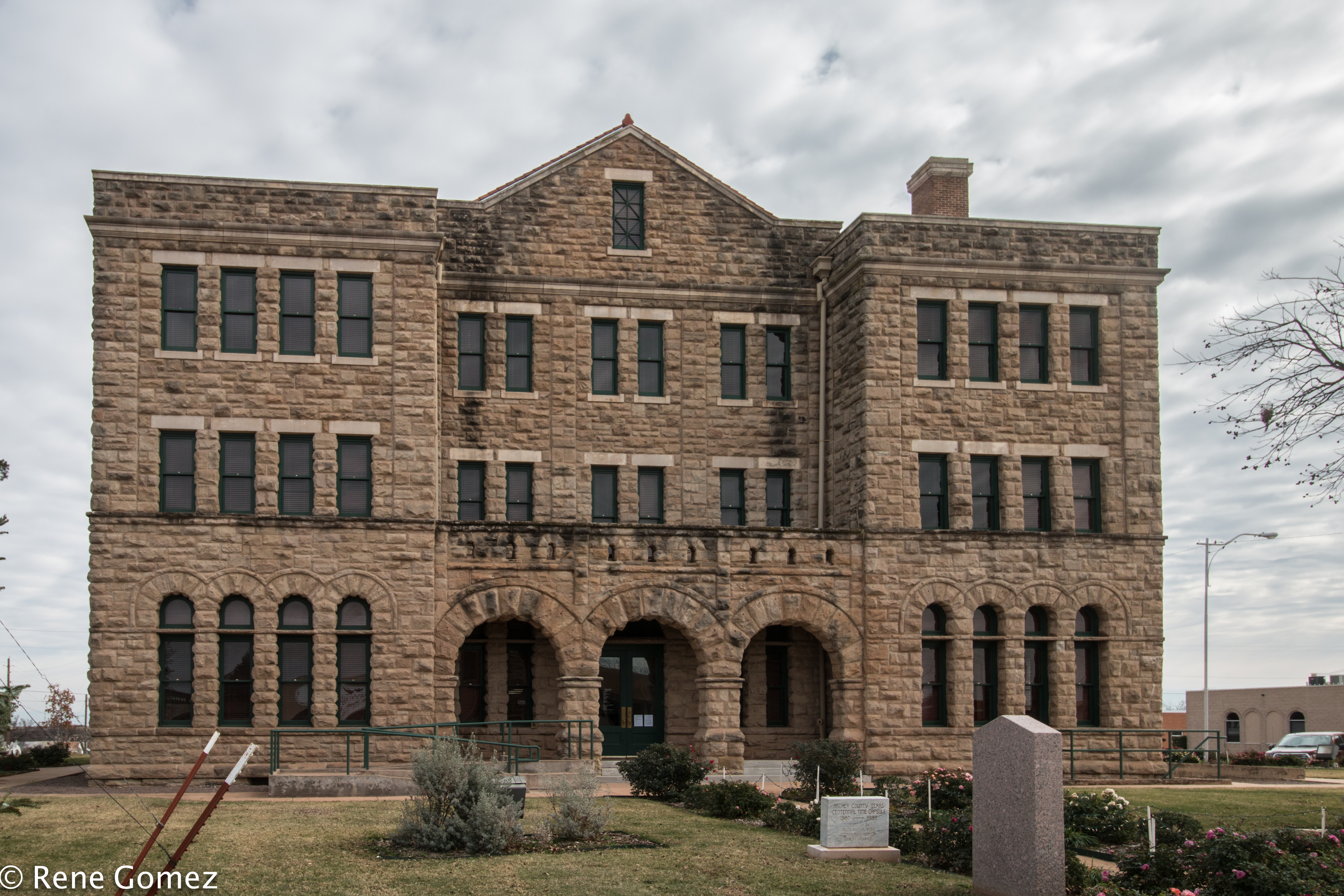
Archer County Courthouse

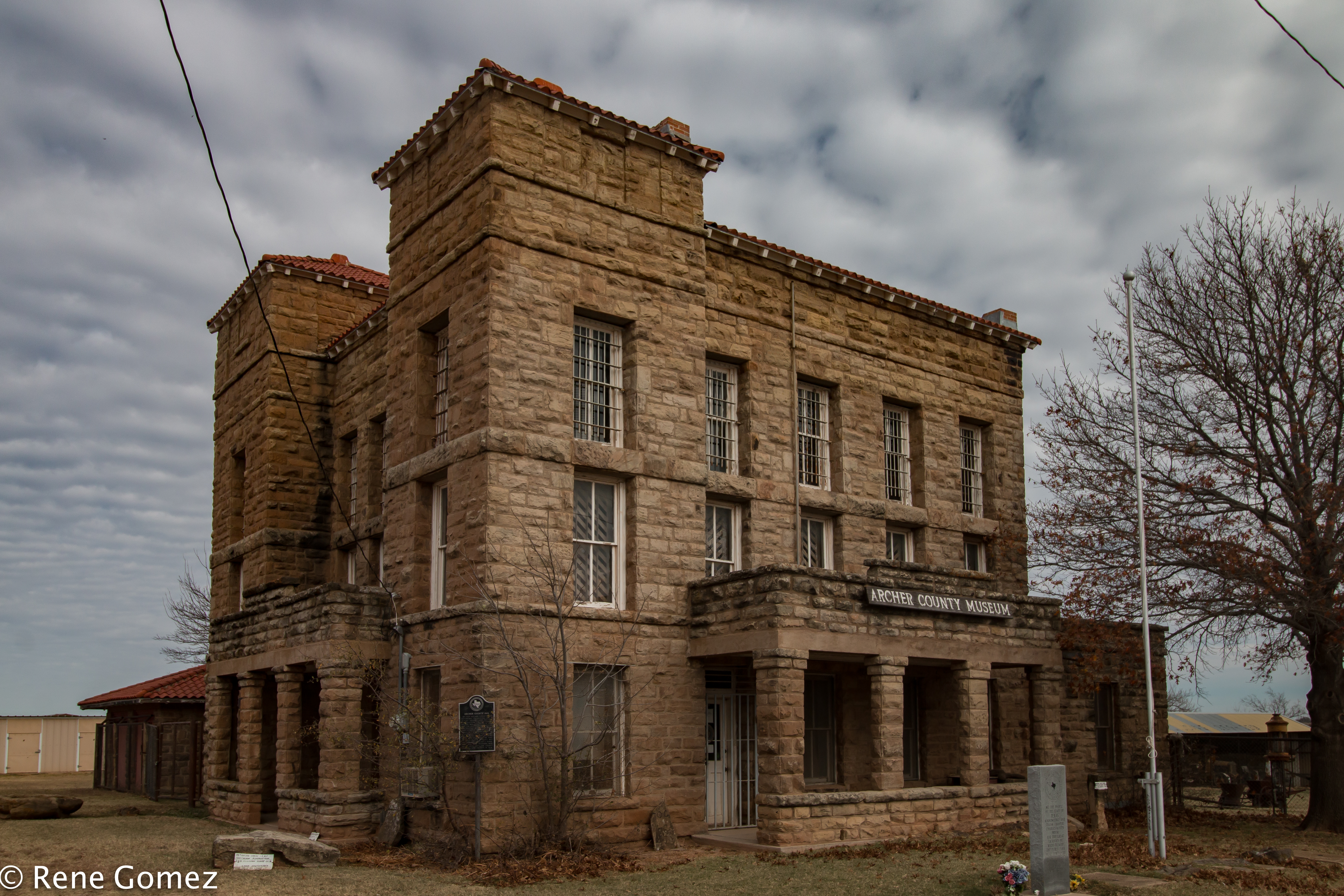
County Courthouse Jail

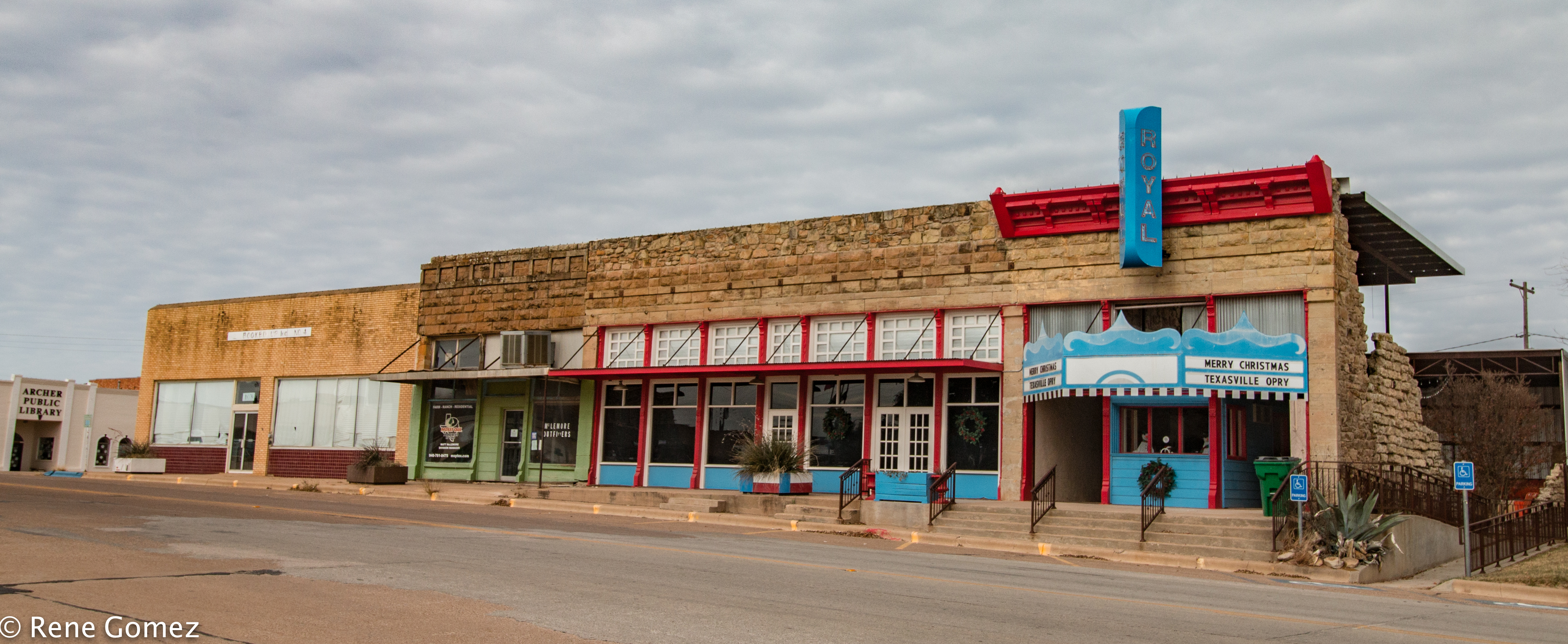
Downtown Archer City

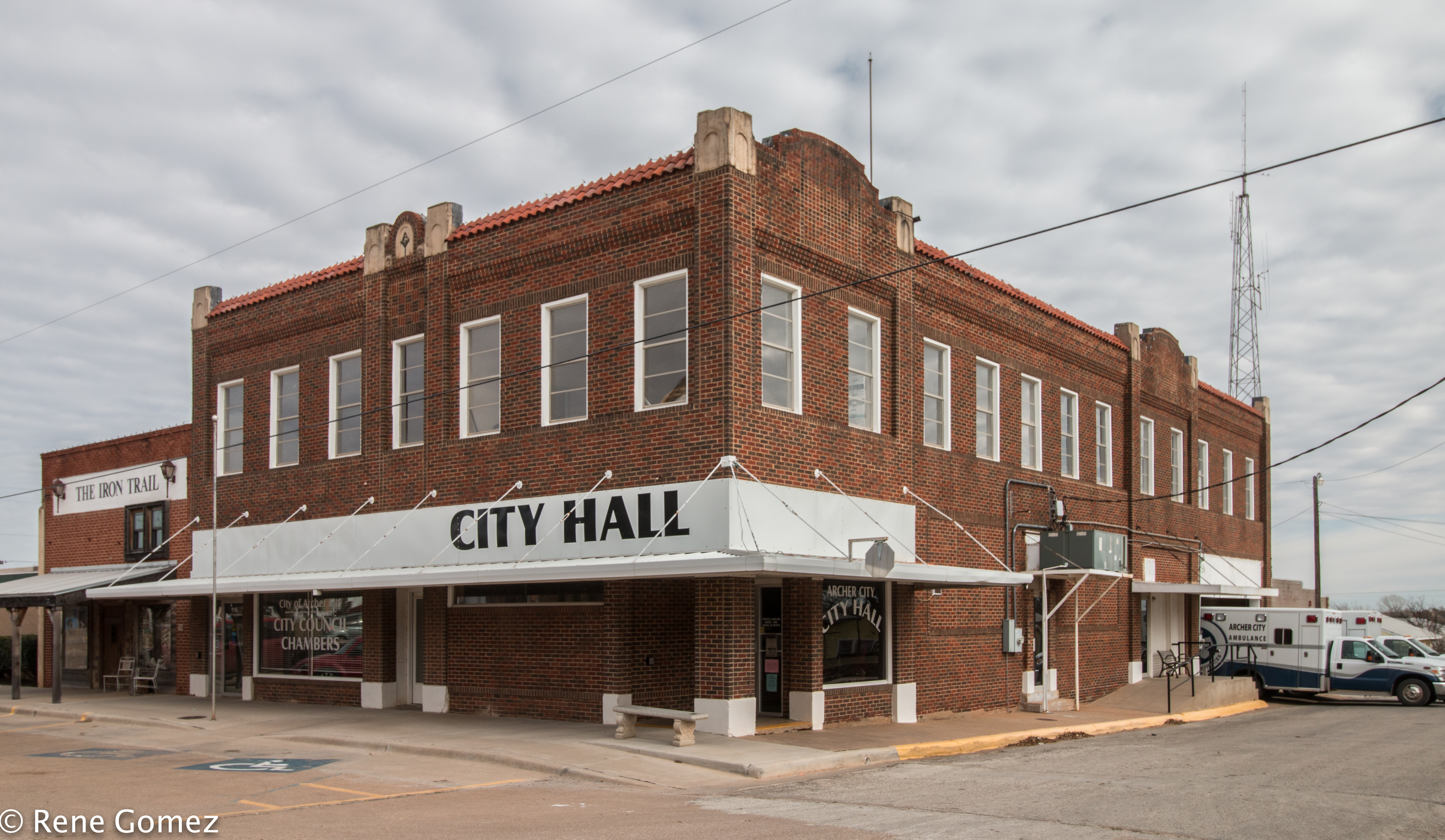
City Hall in Archer City

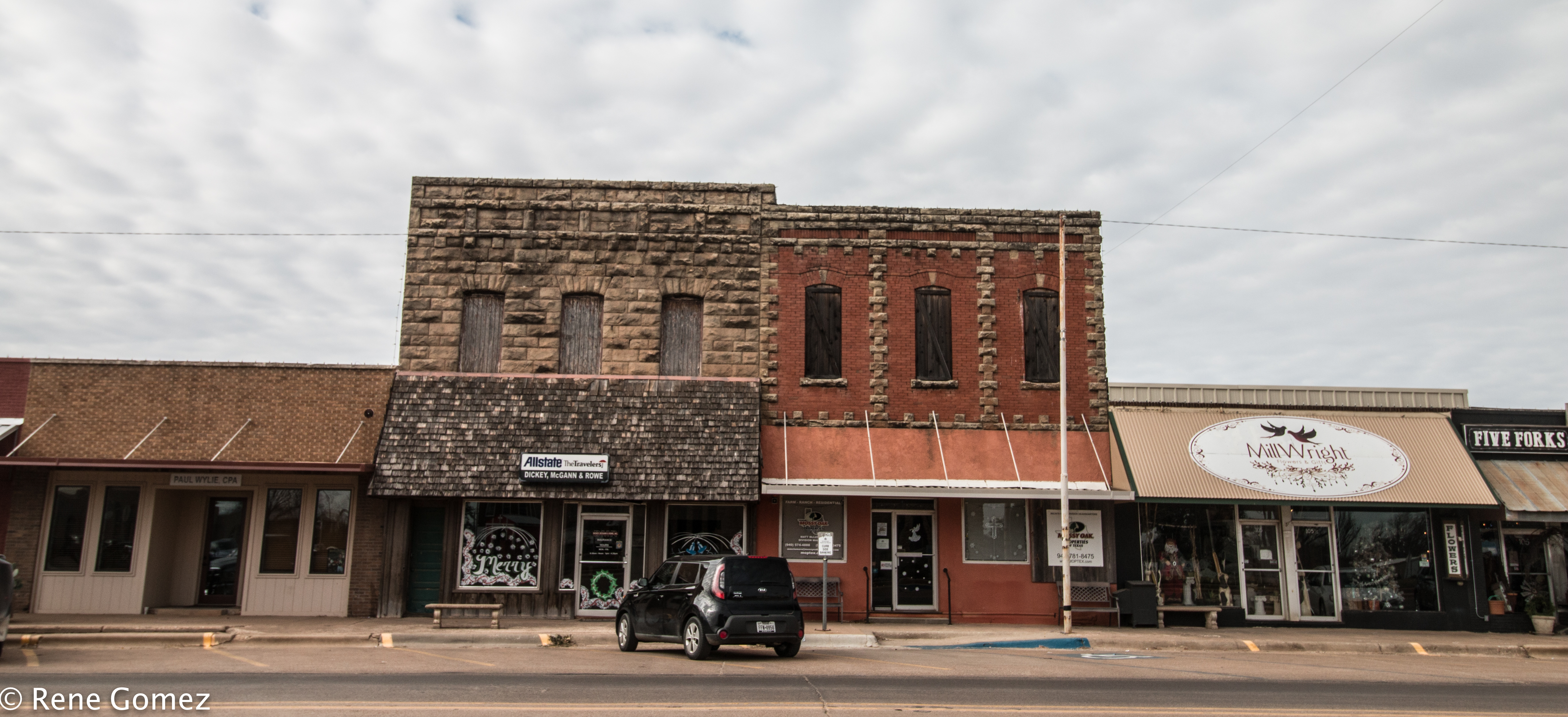
Historic buildings in Archer City
