= Archer County, Texas =

County in Texas, United States

- County
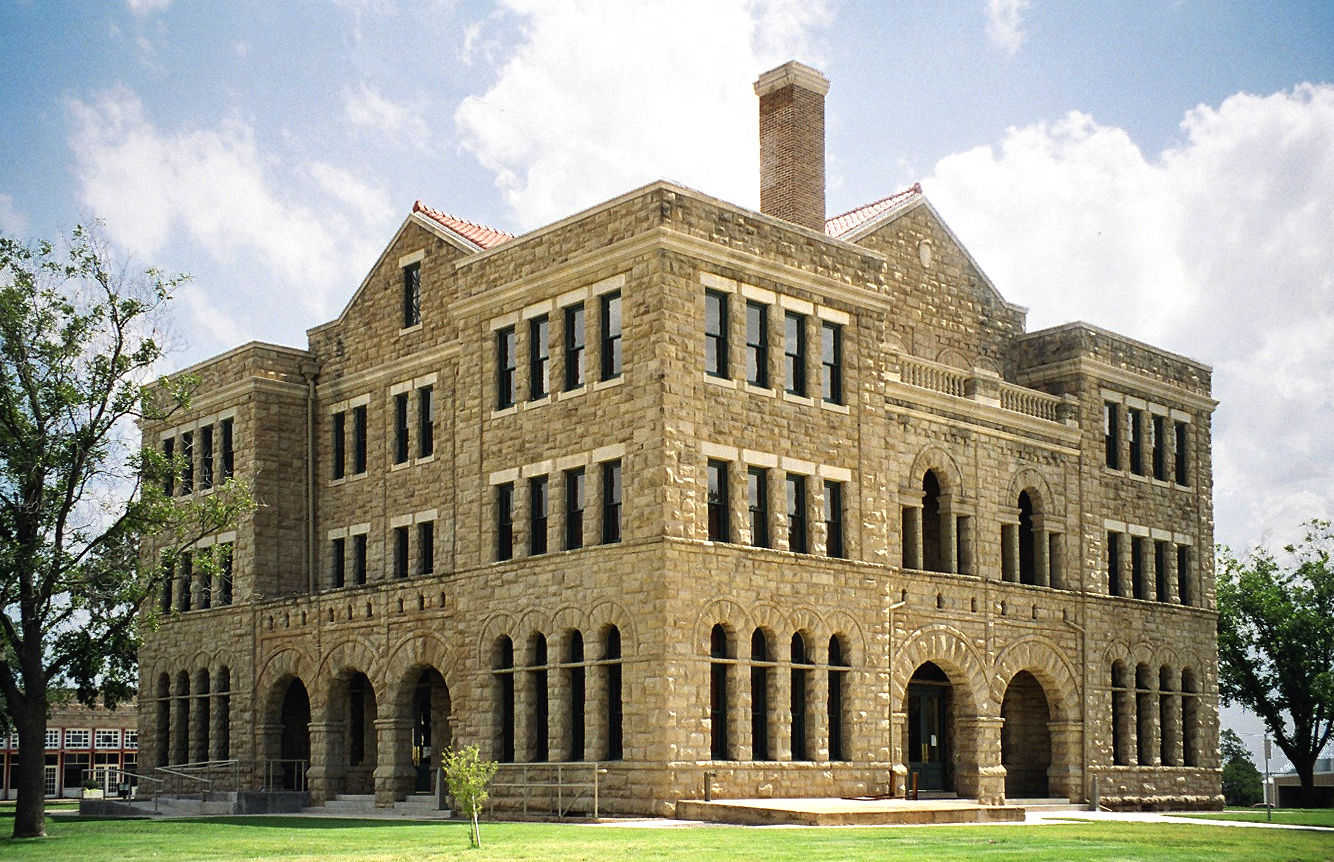
- The Archer County Courthouse in Archer City: The Romanesque style structure was added to the National Register of Historic Places in 1977.

- Location within the U.S. state of Texas
- Coordinates: 33°37′N 98°41′W
- Country: United States
- State: Texas
- Founded: 1880
- Named for: Branch Tanner Archer
- Seat: Archer City
- Largest city: Archer City

Area
  - Total: 925 sq mi (2,400 km^{2})
  - Land: 903 sq mi (2,340 km^{2})
  - Water: 22 sq mi (57 km^{2}) 2.4%

Population (2020)
  - Total: 8,560
  - Estimate (2025): 9,129 ▲
  - Density: 9.48/sq mi (3.66/km^{2})
- Time zone: UTC−6 (Central)
  - Summer (DST): UTC−5 (CDT)
- Congressional district: 13th
- Website: www.co.archer.tx.us

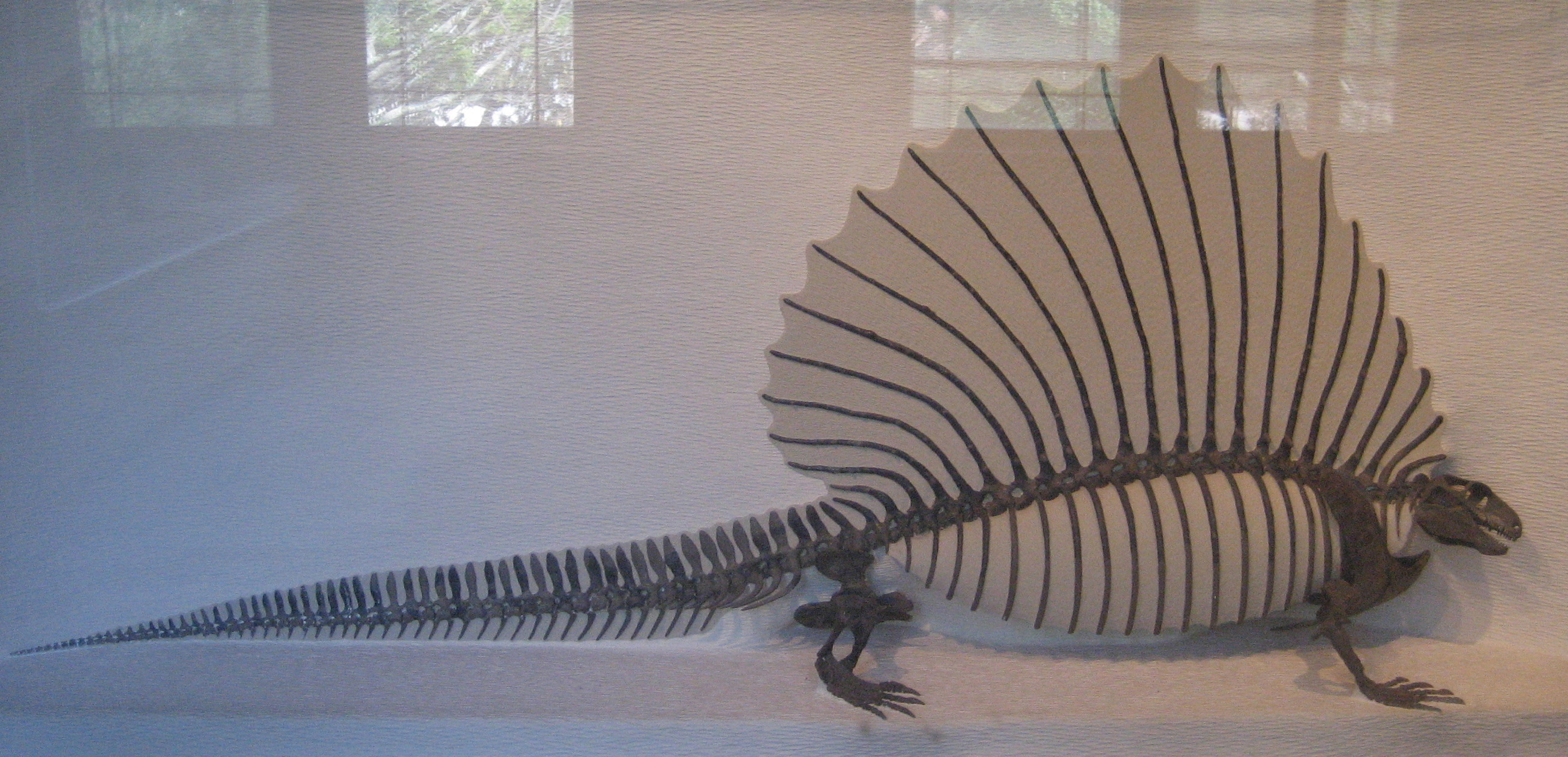
This Edaphosaurus boanerges fossil skeleton from Archer County is on display in Harvard Museum of Natural History.

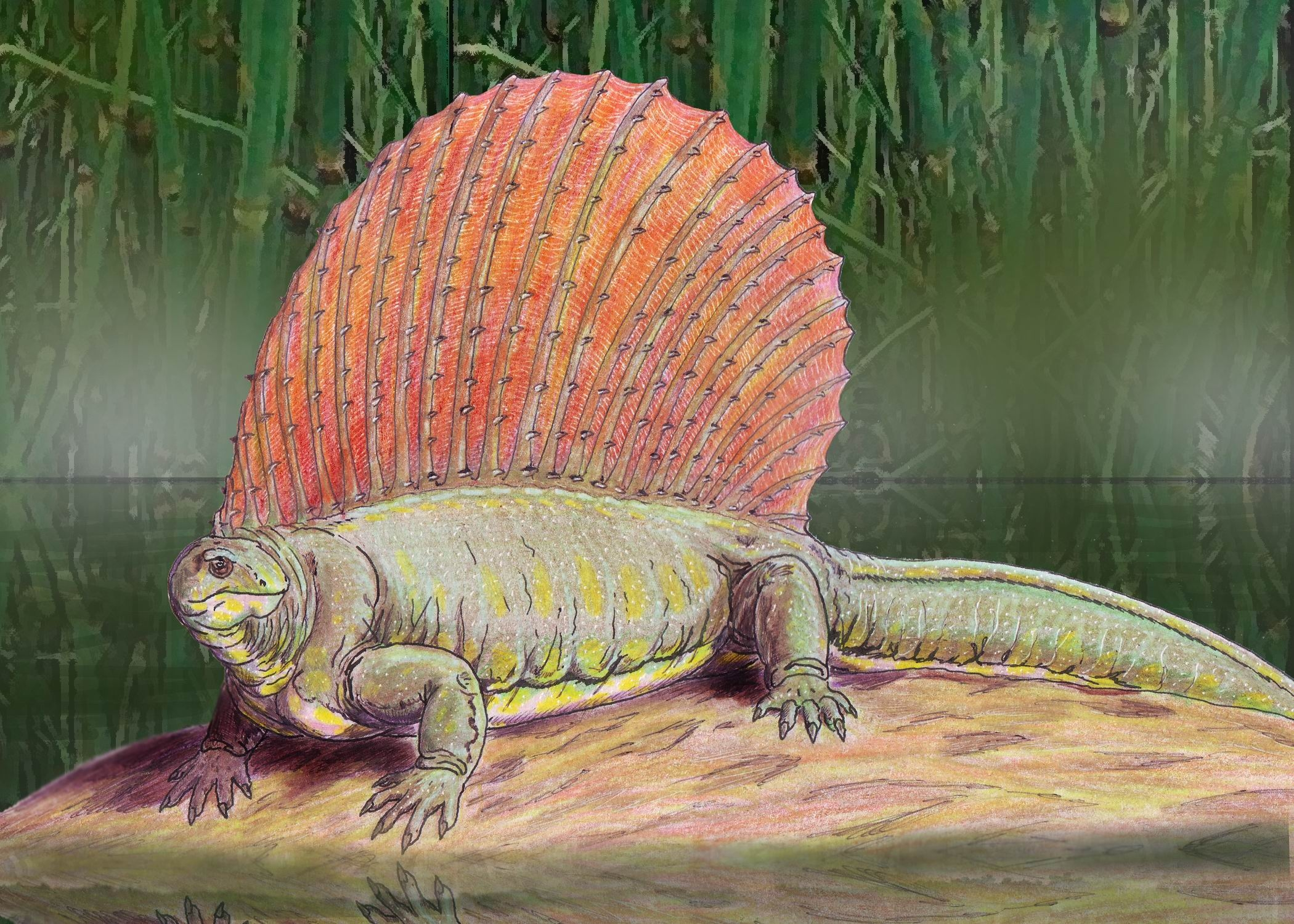
Edaphosaurus boanerges life restoration

Archer County is a county located in the U.S. state of Texas. As of the 2020 census, its population was 8,560. Its county seat is Archer City. It is part of the Wichita Falls metropolitan area.

== History ==
In 1858, the Texas Legislature established Archer County from portions of Fannin County, and it organized in 1880. It is named for Branch Tanner Archer, a commissioner for the Republic of Texas.

== Geography ==
According to the U.S. Census Bureau, the county has a total area of 925 sq mi (2,400 km^{2}), of which 903 sq mi (2,340 km^{2}) are land and 22 sq mi (57 km^{2}) (2.4%) are covered by water.

=== Major highways ===
- U.S. Highway 82
- U.S. Highway 277
- U.S. Highway 281
- State Highway 16
- State Highway 25
- State Highway 79
- State Highway 114

=== Adjacent counties ===
- Wichita County (north)
- Clay County (east)
- Jack County (southeast)
- Young County (south)
- Baylor County (west)
- Wilbarger County (northwest)

== Geology ==
Archer County is part of the Texas Red Beds, which are strata of red-colored sedimentary rock from the Early Permian. One of the most prominent red-bed fossil sites in the county is the Geraldine Bonebed. The fossils of Permian-period vertebrates in the Texas Red Beds were first discovered by Edward Drinker Cope in 1877. Subsequent research has revealed rare fossils of Permian period amphibians such as Trimerorhachis, and rich deposits of other Permian tetrapods such as Dimetrodon and Diadectes.

== Demographics ==
Historical population
Census	Pop.	Note	%±
1880	596		—
1890	2,101		252.5%
1900	2,508		19.4%
1910	6,525		160.2%
1920	5,254		−19.5%
1930	9,684		84.3%
1940	7,599		−21.5%
1950	6,816		−10.3%
1960	6,110		−10.4%
1970	5,759		−5.7%
1980	7,266		26.2%
1990	7,973		9.7%
2000	8,854		11.0%
2010	9,054		2.3%
2020	8,560		−5.5%
2025 (est.)	9,129	▲	6.6%
U.S. Decennial Census; 1850–1900 1910; 1920 1930 1940; 1950 1960 1970; 1980 1990 2000; 2010 2020\n

=== Racial and ethnic composition ===
Archer County, Texas – Racial and ethnic composition Note: the US Census treats Hispanic/Latino as an ethnic category. This table excludes Latinos from the racial categories and assigns them to a separate category. Hispanics/Latinos may be of any race.
Race / Ethnicity (NH = Non-Hispanic)	Pop 1980	Pop 1990	Pop 2000	Pop 2010	Pop 2020	% 1980	% 1990	% 2000	% 2010	% 2020
White alone (NH)	7,067	7,733	8,263	8,182	7,356	97.26%	96.99%	93.33%	90.37%	85.93%
Black or African American alone (NH)	17	11	7	34	30	0.23%	0.14%	0.08%	0.38%	0.35%
Native American or Alaska Native alone (NH)	38	36	47	47	71	0.52%	0.45%	0.53%	0.52%	0.83%
Asian alone (NH)	6	4	11	18	18	0.08%	0.05%	0.12%	0.20%	0.21%
Native Hawaiian or Pacific Islander alone (NH)	x	x	3	3	0	x	x	0.03%	0.03%	0.00%
Other race alone (NH)	0	0	3	4	21	0.00%	0.00%	0.03%	0.04%	0.25%
Mixed race or Multiracial (NH)	x	x	89	91	322	x	x	1.01%	1.01%	3.76%
Hispanic or Latino (any race)	138	189	431	675	742	1.90%	2.37%	4.87%	7.46%	8.67%
Total	7,266	7,973	8,854	9,054	8,560	100.00%	100.00%	100.00%	100.00%	100.00%

=== 2020 census ===
As of the 2020 census, the county had a population of 8,560. The median age was 44.2 years; 22.8% of the residents were under 18 and 19.7% were 65 or older. The female/male ratio was 1:0.991 overall and 1:0.970 for those 18 and over.

The racial makeup of the county was 88.2% White, 0.4% Black or African American, 1.3% American Indian and Alaska Native, 0.2% Asian, <0.1% Native Hawaiian and Pacific Islander, 3.5% from some other race, and 6.4% from two or more races. Hispanic or Latino residents of any race comprised 8.7% of the population.

About 12.6% of residents lived in urban areas, while 87.4% lived in rural areas.

Of thee 3,396 households in the county, 32.2% had children under 18 living in them, 59.5% were married-couple households, 16.1% were households with a male householder and no spouse or partner present, and 20.8% were households with a female householder and no spouse or partner present. About 24.2% of all households were made up of individuals, and 12.6% had someone living alone who was 65 or older.

The county had 3,865 housing units, of which 12.1% were vacant. Among occupied housing units, 84.3% were owner-occupied and 15.7% were renter-occupied. The homeowner vacancy rate was 1.5% and the rental vacancy rate was 11.9%.

=== 2000 census ===
As of the census of 2000, 8,854 people, 3,345 households, and 2,515 families resided in the county. The population density was 10 people/mi^{2} (3.9 people/km^{2}). The 3,871 housing units averaged 4 per square mile (1.5/km^{2}). The racial makeup of the county was 95.54% White, 0.08% African American, 0.62% Native American, 0.12% Asian, 0.03% Pacific Islander, 2.28% from other races, and 1.32% from two or more races. About 4.87% of the population was Hispanic or Latino of any race.

Of the 3,345 households, 37.2% had children under 18 living with them, 65.0% were married couples living together, 7.2% had a female householder with no husband present, and 24.8% were not families. Of all unmarried partner households, 89.8% were heterosexual, 1.9% were same-sex male, and 8.3% were same-sex female. About 21.9% of all households were made up of individuals, and 10.2% had someone who was 65 or older living alone. The average household size was 2.63, and the average family size was 3.08.

In the county, the age distribution was 28.2% under 18, 7.0% from 18 to 24, 27.4% from 25 to 44, 23.5% from 45 to 64, and 13.9% who were 65 or older. The median age was 38 years. For every 100 females, there were 100.2 males. For every 100 females 18 and over, there were 96.2 males.

The median income in the county for a household was $38,514 and for a family was $45,984. Males had a median income of $31,386 versus $22,119 for females. The per capita income for the county was $19,300. About 6.8% of families and 9.0% of the population were below the poverty line, including 9.9% of those under 18 and 10.8% of those 65 or over.

== Education ==
These school districts serve Archer County:

- Archer City Independent School District
- Holliday Independent School District
- Iowa Park Consolidated Independent School District (partial)
- Jacksboro Independent School District (partial)
- Olney Independent School District (partial)
- Windthorst Independent School District

Megargel Independent School District once served portions of Archer County, but it closed in 2006.

The county is in the service area of Vernon College.

== Ranching industry ==
The Seymour Division of the sprawling 320,000-deeded-acre (1400 km^{2}) La Escalera Ranch is located north of Seymour, Texas in Baylor County with portions in Archer County. The Seymour Division consists of 34,000 acres (14,000 hectares), which formerly was known as the Cross Bar Ranch when it was owned by the Claude Cowan Sr. Trust. The ranch was purchased in January 2005 by the Gerald Lyda family and La Escalera Limited Partnership, and is managed by partner Jo Lyda Granberg and her husband K. G. Granberg of Seymour. La Escalera Ranch also extends over much of Pecos County and portions of Reeves and Brewster Counties. It is known for its herd of Black Angus cattle and its abundant wildlife.

Joseph Sterling Bridwell, a Wichita Falls philanthropist and oilman, also owned a ranch in Archer County.

== Dairy industry ==
Archer County is one of the more prominent areas of dairy product production in Texas. The two southeastern Archer County cities of Scotland and Windthorst have 37 functioning dairy farms nearby as of 2019. The dairy industry moved to the area in the early 1900s and has persisted through the years. Though this area has many operating dairies, the number of dairy cattle makes up a fractions of the numbers that are raised in the other dairy pockets of Texas such as Dalhart/Dumas and the Stephenville area. Every dairy farm in the Scotland/Windthorst area is family owned, and this is from where most of the economy of the two cities derives.

== Politics ==
Archer County is represented in the Texas House of Representatives by Republican James Frank, a businessman from Wichita Falls. Archer County is heavily Republican, and has voted for the presidential candidate of that party in every election since 1980.

Archer County is located within District 69 of the Texas House of Representatives. Archer County is located within District 30 of the Texas Senate.

United States presidential election results for Archer County, Texas
Year	Republican		Democratic		Third party(ies)	
Year	No.	%	No.	%	No.	%
1912	25	4.73%	457	86.39%	47	8.88%
1916	104	15.50%	527	78.54%	40	5.96%
1920	169	26.20%	449	69.61%	27	4.19%
1924	146	13.07%	883	79.05%	88	7.88%
1928	799	48.02%	865	51.98%	0	0.00%
1932	97	5.86%	1,555	94.01%	2	0.12%
1936	146	8.01%	1,672	91.77%	4	0.22%
1940	276	12.65%	1,904	87.30%	1	0.05%
1944	194	9.25%	1,674	79.83%	229	10.92%
1948	191	10.30%	1,599	86.20%	65	3.50%
1952	937	42.36%	1,272	57.50%	3	0.14%
1956	825	43.44%	1,067	56.19%	7	0.37%
1960	680	33.61%	1,341	66.29%	2	0.10%
1964	441	19.98%	1,766	80.02%	0	0.00%
1968	636	26.98%	1,308	55.49%	413	17.52%
1972	1,494	69.42%	632	29.37%	26	1.21%
1976	966	37.72%	1,577	61.58%	18	0.70%
1980	1,804	54.85%	1,444	43.90%	41	1.25%
1984	2,487	69.33%	1,089	30.36%	11	0.31%
1988	2,010	55.13%	1,627	44.62%	9	0.25%
1992	1,560	39.32%	1,284	32.37%	1,123	28.31%
1996	1,974	54.01%	1,235	33.79%	446	12.20%
2000	2,951	73.83%	993	24.84%	53	1.33%
2004	3,556	79.89%	878	19.73%	17	0.38%
2008	3,595	82.36%	740	16.95%	30	0.69%
2012	3,600	86.46%	525	12.61%	39	0.94%
2016	3,786	88.40%	394	9.20%	103	2.40%
2020	4,300	89.66%	446	9.30%	50	1.04%
2024	4,592	89.48%	520	10.13%	20	0.39%

United States Senate election results for Archer County, Texas1
Year	Republican		Democratic		Third party(ies)	
Year	No.	%	No.	%	No.	%
2024	4,483	87.75%	562	11.00%	64	1.25%

United States Senate election results for Archer County, Texas2
Year	Republican		Democratic		Third party(ies)	
Year	No.	%	No.	%	No.	%
2020	4,178	88.44%	467	9.89%	79	1.67%

Texas Gubernatorial election results for Archer County
Year	Republican		Democratic		Third party(ies)	
Year	No.	%	No.	%	No.	%
2022	3,498	90.90%	315	8.19%	35	0.91%

== Communities ==
=== Cities ===
- Archer City (county seat)
- Holliday
- Scotland

=== Towns ===
- Lakeside City
- Megargel
- Windthorst (partly in Clay County)

=== Unincorporated communities ===
- Dads Corner
- Dundee
- Mankins

=== Ghost towns ===
- Anarene
- Huff

== See also ==
- List of museums in North Texas
- National Register of Historic Places listings in Archer County, Texas
- Recorded Texas Historic Landmarks in Archer County
