= Renick =

Renick is both a given name and a surname.

Notable people with the given name include:

- Renick Bell, American musician, programmer, and teacher
- Renick William Dunlap (1872–1945), American politician
- Renick James (born 1987), Belizean judoka

Notable people with the surname include:

- Bill Renick (born 1953), American politician
- Dick Renick (1930–2022), American politician
- Frank Renick (1864–1921), American politician
- James C. Renick (1948–2021), American academic leader
- Jesse Renick (1917–1999), American basketball player
- Ralph Renick (1928–1991), American television journalist
- Rick Renick (1944–2026), American baseball player, manager and coach
- Ruth Renick (1893–1984), American actress
- Sam Renick (1910–1999), American jockey

== See also ==
- Renick Farm (disambiguation)
- Renick House
- Renicks, another surname
- Rennicke, another surname
