= Valley View, Wichita County, Texas =

Valley View
- Unincorporated community
- Location within the state of Texas Valley View (the United States)
- Coordinates: 33°52′22″N 98°45′47″W
- Country: United States
- State: Texas
- County: Wichita
- Elevation: 1,007 ft (307 m)
- Time zone: UTC-6 (Central (CST))
  - Summer (DST): UTC-5 (CDT)

Valley View is an unincorporated community in Wichita County, Texas, United States. It has an estimated population of 200.

Valley View is part of the Wichita Falls, Texas Metropolitan Statistical Area.

== Geography ==
Valley View is located on Farm to Market Road 2226, eight miles southwest of Wichita Falls in southwestern Wichita County. Its elevation is 1,007 feet above sea level.

== History ==
Valley View was established in 1889 and soon became a community center for area farmers. An elementary school was constructed in 1927 to serve 300 students. An Independent School District was established the following year. By 1931, the district had a total of 555 students and 13 teachers, at the time making it the largest such educational unit in a Texas community without a post office. In the following years, the population declined and in 1970, the Valley View school district had consolidated with that of Iowa Park, keeping only grades one through six in operation locally. At the completion of the 1980 school year, the Valley View School closed permanently.

The community had a population of approximately 200 in 1990, a figure that remains the same today.

== Education ==
Valley View is part of the Iowa Park Consolidated Independent School District.
