= Chase Wright (baseball) =

American baseball player (born 1983)

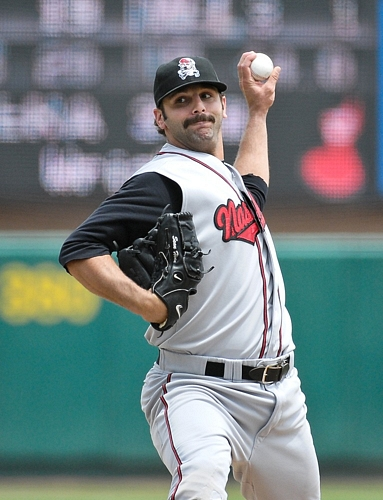
- Pitcher
- Born: February 8, 1983 (age 43); Wichita Falls, Texas, U.S.
- Batted: Left Threw: Left

MLB debut
- April 17, 2007, for the New York Yankees

Last MLB appearance
- September 30, 2007, for the New York Yankees

MLB statistics
- Win–loss record: 2–0
- Earned run average: 7.20
- Strikeouts: 8
- Stats at Baseball Reference

Teams
- New York Yankees (2007)

Sebern Chase Wright (born February 8, 1983) is an American former professional baseball pitcher. He batted and threw left-handed. Wright threw a low 90s four-seam fastball, a slider, a curveball, and a changeup.

== Baseball career ==
Wright was drafted in the third round of the 2001 Major League draft by the New York Yankees out of Iowa Park High School. After spending five seasons in the minors, he was placed on the Yankees' 40-man roster, to protect him from the Rule 5 draft. He started the 2007 season with the Double-A Trenton Thunder, where he performed well. In two starts, Wright pitched 14 innings, striking out 19, without allowing an earned run.

He was called up by the Yankees from Trenton in April 2007, when Mike Mussina and Carl Pavano were placed on the disabled list. Wright made his major league debut on April 17, against the Cleveland Indians. He pitched five innings for his first major league win. In his second start, on April 22, Wright faced the Boston Red Sox at Fenway Park, during which he became the second pitcher in major league history to give up four consecutive home runs; he surrendered home runs during the third inning to Red Sox players Manny Ramírez, J. D. Drew, Mike Lowell, and Jason Varitek. The Red Sox went on to win the game 7–6. He was then sent back to the minors, though he was recalled in September to pitch in one game.

Wright spent the 2008 season pitching for Double-A Trenton and the Triple-A Scranton/Wilkes-Barre Yankees. He was designated for assignment that offseason to make room on the 40-man roster for the re-signed Andy Pettitte.

On February 4, 2009, Wright was traded to the Milwaukee Brewers for outfielder/catcher Eric Fryer. He played the entire season with the Triple-A Nashville Sounds. Wright became a minor league free agent after the season but re-signed a minor league contract with the Brewers on February 9, 2010. He pitched for Nashville for the entire 2010 season.

Wright was released on July 18, 2011, but was re-signed to a minor league contract with the Brewers just days later.

On April 13, 2012 Wright was signed by the Somerset Patriots of the independent Atlantic League of Professional Baseball. He was not on the Patriots roster in 2013.
