= Lake Iowa Park =

Lake in Texas, United States

- Location within Texas Location within the United States
- Interactive map of Lake Iowa Park
- Location: Iowa Park, Texas
- Coordinates: 33°58′38.7″N 98°42′35.5″W
- Type: Lake
- Basin countries: United States
- Managing agency: City of Iowa Park
- Surface area: 656 acres (265 ha)
- Average depth: 48 feet (15 m)
- Surface elevation: 1,033 feet (315 m)
- References: U.S. Geological Survey Geographic Names Information System: Lake Iowa Park

Lake Iowa Park is a lake located in Iowa Park, Texas. The lake is located north of U.S. Route 287, and north-west of Wichita Falls. The larger North Fork Buffalo Creek Reservoir stands directly to the west.
