= KXXN =

Coordinates: 33.901°N 98.540°W

- Iowa Park, Texas; United States
- Broadcast area: Wichita Falls metropolitan area
- Frequency: 97.5 MHz
- Branding: Big Country 97.5

Programming
- Format: Classic Country

Ownership
- Owner: Falls Media, LLC
- Sister stations: KWFB

History
- First air date: 2009 (at 96 .3)
- Former frequencies: 96.3 MHz (2009–2018)

Technical information
- Licensing authority: FCC
- Facility ID: 165970
- Class: C2
- ERP: 37,500 watts
- HAAT: 111.3 meters

Links
- Public license information: Public file; LMS
- Website: bigcountry975.com

KXXN (branded as "Big Country 97.5") is a radio station serving Wichita Falls, Texas and Vicinity with a Classic Country format. The station previously operated on 96.3 FM and aired a Regional Mexican music format as "La Ley 96.3." Prior to that, the station was urban adult contemporary "K 96.3 Jamz", and top 40 "Hot 96.3" after being sold to its current owners. Before Falls Media owned it, the station broadcast a new country format as "Cat Country" until early-to-mid 2012, after trying out several formats including hip-hop and Christian AC.

KXXN upgraded its signal and moved to 97.5 FM on February 1, 2018. The station is owned by Falls Media, LLC, which also owns 100.9 KWFB in the Wichita Falls area.
