= Iowa Park High School =

Public school in Texas, United States

Location
- 1 Bob Dawson Drive; Iowa Park, Texas 76367-1199; United States; 33.964775°N 98.693058°W

Information
- Type: Co-Educational, Public, Secondary
- School district: Iowa Park Consolidated Independent School District
- Principal: Clifton McFadden
- Teaching staff: 50.70 (FTE)
- Grades: 9-12
- Enrollment: 541 (2023–2024)
- Student to teacher ratio: 10.67
- Colors: Green & White
- Athletics conference: UIL Class AAA
- Mascot: Hawk
- Yearbook: The Hawk
- Website: www.ipcisd.net/o/iphs

Iowa Park High School is a public school in Iowa Park, Texas. It is part of the Iowa Park Consolidated Independent School District and serves students in and around the Iowa Park area. In 2011, the school was rated "academically acceptable" by the Texas Education Agency.

The district, which has Iowa Park High as its sole comprehensive high school, includes Iowa Park, most of Pleasant Valley, and a small portion of Wichita Falls.

== Student demographics ==
As of the 2005–2006 school year, Iowa Park High had a total of 611 students (90.5% White, 6.2% Hispanic, 1.00% African American, 0.1% Asian/Pacific Islander, and 2.8% Native American). Economic disadvantage afflicted 22.3% of the student.

== Athletics ==
The Iowa Park Hawks compete in cross-country running, volleyball, football, basketball, powerlifting, golf, tennis, track and field, softball, and baseball.

=== State titles ===
- Football - 1969 (2A), 1970 (2A)
- Boys' track - 1960 (1A), co-champion with Refugio High School

== Notable alumni ==
- Chase Wright, former MLB pitcher
