= Renicks =

Renicks is a surname. Notable people with the surname include:

- Kimberley Renicks (born 1988), Scottish judoka
- Louise Renicks (born 1982), Scottish judoka
- Steve Renicks (born 1975), Scottish footballer

== See also ==
- Renick, another surname, given name, place name
- Rennicke, another surname
