= KWFB =

KWFB may refer to:

- KWFB (TV), the fictional call sign for television channel KGET-TV-DT2 in Bakersfield, California, United States
- KWFB (FM), a radio station (100.9 FM) licensed to Holliday, Texas, United States
