= Texas State Highway 258 =

State highway in Texas

State Highway 258
- SH 258, highlighted in red

Route information
- Maintained by TxDOT
- Length: 11.165 mi (17.968 km)
- Existed: 1937–present

Major junctions
- West end: SH 25 at Kadane Corner
- East end: US 82 / US 277 northeast of Holliday

Location
- Country: United States
- State: Texas
- Counties: Wichita

Highway system
- Highways in Texas; Interstate; US; State; Former; Toll; Loops; Spurs; FM/RM; Park; Rec
← SH 257	→ US 259

State Highway 258 (SH 258) is a short state highway in northern Texas.

== Route description ==
SH 258 begins at SH 25 in the rural community of Kadane Corner. The highway runs eastward, just north of the Archer County line. The route ends at a junction with US 82 / US 277 southwest of Wichita Falls.

== History ==
SH 258 route was designated on December 2, 1937 along its current route.

== Major intersections ==
The entire route is in Wichita County.

Location	mi	km	Destinations	Notes
Kadane Corner	0.0	0.0	SH 25	Western terminus
Kamay	1.7	2.7	FM 1206	
	4.4	7.1	FM 2226	
	7.7	12.4	FM 368 – Holliday	
	11.2	18.0	US 82 / US 277 – Seymour, Wichita Falls	Eastern terminus
1.000 mi = 1.609 km; 1.000 km = 0.621 mi
