= Kamay, Texas =

Kamay
- Unincorporated community
- Nickname: kayema
- Location within the state of Texas Kamay (the United States)
- Coordinates: 33°51′28″N 98°48′29″W
- Country: United States
- State: Texas
- County: Wichita
- Elevation: 1,033 ft (315 m)

Population (2000)
  - Total: 640
- Time zone: UTC-6 (Central (CST))
  - Summer (DST): UTC-5 (CDT)
- ZIP code: 76369

Kamay (/ˈkeɪmeɪ/ KAY-may) is an unincorporated community in Wichita County, Texas, United States. It had an estimated population of 640 in 2000.

Kamay is part of the Wichita Falls, Texas Metropolitan Statistical Area.

== Geography ==
Kamay is located on State Highway 258, twelve miles (19 km) southwest of Wichita Falls in southwestern Wichita County. Its elevation is 1,033 feet (315 m) above sea level.

== History ==
Development in the area began in 1912 when Joseph A. Kemp, W. Munger, and Reese S. Allen formed a land company that purchased 1,000 acres (4.0 km^{2}) of Wichita River valley land for resale. By the 1920s, investors had turned their attention to oil exploration and the K-M-A Oil Company was established. The name was formed from each of the three principals' last names.

The community that developed around the oil fields became known as Kemp City by 1928. Within ten years, more than 100 wells were operating in and around Kemp City. The community's name again changed in the 1930s. Texas already had a post office operating under the name Kemp (in Kaufman County), while using the initials K-M-A was deemed unacceptable. The name Kamay was chosen to solve the problem. Despite Kamay being the official name, Kemp City remained in use as well.

At its peak in the 1940s, Kamay had a population of around 700 and twenty-one businesses. There were twenty-seven businesses in Kamay by the mid-1950s. In 2000, the population had declined to approximately 640 with seven businesses operating in the community.

== Education ==
The community of Kamay is part of the Iowa Park Consolidated Independent School District.
