= City View Junior/Senior High School =

Location
- 1600 City View Drive; Wichita Falls, Wichita, Texas 76306; United States; 33.94275°N 98.553381°W

Information
- School type: Public high school
- School district: City View Independent School District
- Principal: Jesse Thomas
- Assistant Principals: Carl Pennington/Jennifer Sidlauskas
- Teaching staff: 57.84 (FTE)
- Grades: 6–12
- Enrollment: 638 (2023–2024)
- Student to teacher ratio: 11.03
- Colors: Blue and White
- Athletics conference: UIL Class 3A
- Mascot: Mustang
- Website: cvjshs.cityview-isd.net

City View Junior/Senior High School is a 3A public secondary school in Wichita Falls, Texas, United States. It is part of the City View Independent School District located on the western edge of Wichita Falls and serves grades six through 12. In 2022, the school was given a ""B" rating" by the Texas Education Agency.

In addition to sections of Wichita Falls, the school includes a portion of Pleasant Valley.

== Athletics ==
The City View Mustangs compete in cross-country running, volleyball, football, basketball, power lifting, track and field, softball, and baseball.
