= City View Independent School District =

School district in Texas, United States

City View Independent School District is a public school district based in Wichita Falls, Texas, United States.

Northwestern portions of Wichita Falls are served by the district, as well as a small section of Pleasant Valley.

In 2009, the school district was rated "recognized" by the Texas Education Agency.

== Schools ==
- City View Junior/Senior High School (grades 6-12)
- City View Elementary School (prekindergarten-grade 5)
