= World's littlest skyscraper =

Building in Wichita Falls, Texas, US

Newby–McMahon Building
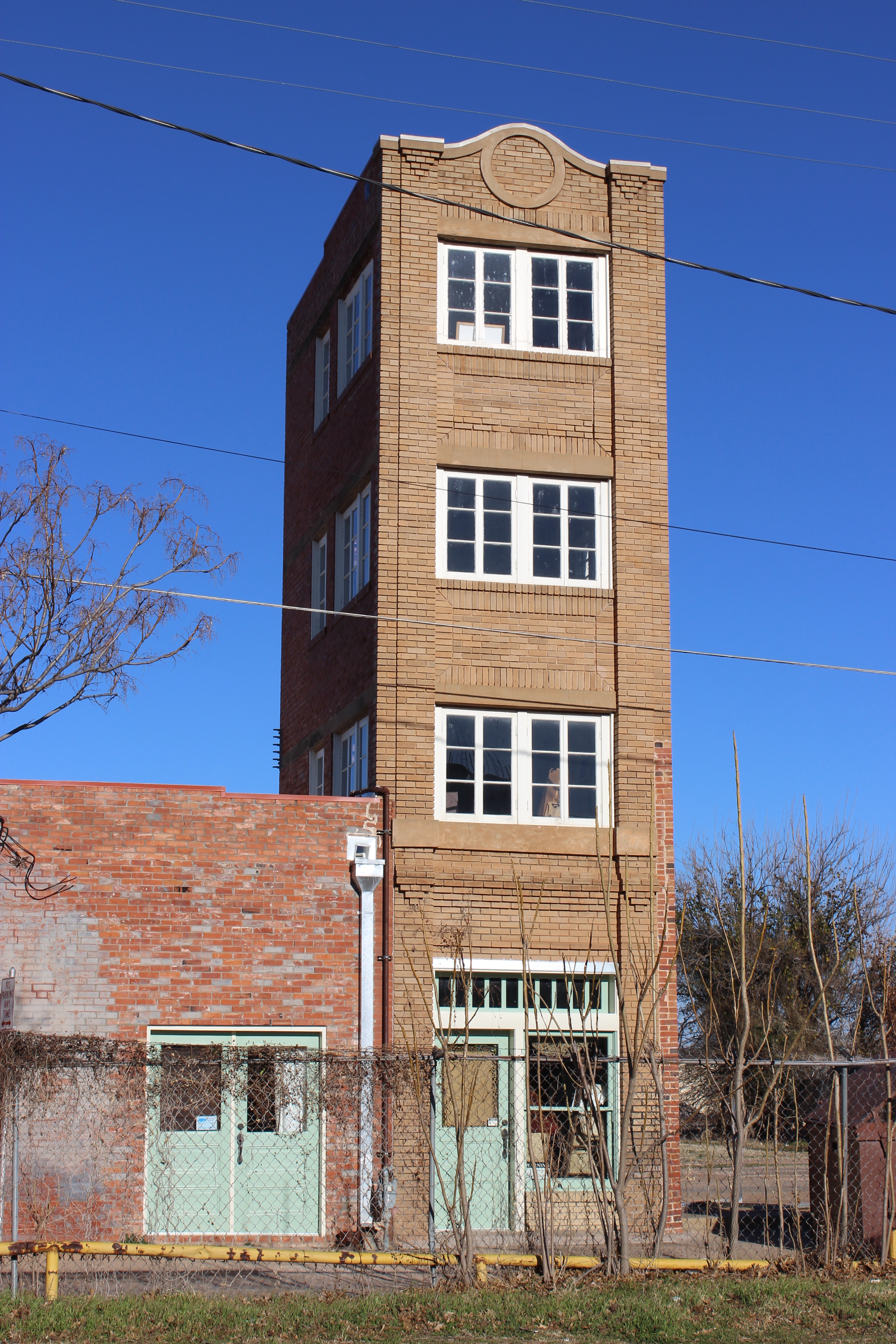
- Photographed in January 2016

General information
- Type: Mixed-use
- Location: Wichita Falls, Texas, United States
- Coordinates: 33.9144°N 98.4897°W
- Construction started: 1919
- Completed: 1919
- Opening: 1919
- Cost: US$200,000 (equivalent to $3.7 million in 2025)

Height
- Roof: 12.2 m (40.0 ft)

Technical details
- Floor count: 4 habitable floors
- Floor area: 40 m^{2} (430 sq ft)

Design and construction
- Architect: Michael Beards
- Structural engineer: J.D. McMahon
- Main contractor: J.D. McMahon
- Newby–McMahon Building
- U.S. Historic district – Contributing property
- Part of: Depot Square Historic District (ID03001552)
- Designated CP: February 4, 2004

The Newby–McMahon Building, commonly referred to as the World's littlest skyscraper, is located at 701 La Salle (on the corner of Seventh and La Salle streets) in downtown Wichita Falls, Texas. It is a late Neoclassical style red brick and cast stone structure. It stands 40 ft (12 m; 480 in) tall, and its exterior dimensions are 18 ft (5.5 m) deep and 10 ft (3.0 m) wide.

The building's interior dimensions are approximately 12 ft (3.7 m) by 9 ft (2.7 m), or approximately 108 sq ft (10.0 m^{2}). Steep, narrow, internal stairways leading to the upper floors occupy roughly 25 percent of the interior area.

Reportedly the result of a fraudulent investment scheme by a confidence man, the Newby–McMahon Building was a source of great embarrassment to the city and its residents after its completion in 1919. During the 1920s, the Newby–McMahon Building was featured in Robert Ripley's Ripley's Believe It or Not! syndicated column as "the world's littlest skyscraper", a nickname that has stuck with it ever since.

The Newby–McMahon Building is now part of the Depot Square Historic District of Wichita Falls, a Texas Historic Landmark.

== Background ==
In 1912, a large petroleum reservoir was discovered just west of the city of Burkburnett, a small town in Wichita County, Texas. Burkburnett and its surrounding communities became boomtowns, experiencing explosive growth of their populations and economies.

By 1918, an estimated 20,000 new settlers had taken up residence around the lucrative oil field, and many Wichita County residents became wealthy extremely quickly. As people streamed into the local communities in search of high-paying jobs, the nearby city of Wichita Falls began to grow in importance.

Although it initially lacked the necessary infrastructure for this sudden increase in economic and industrial activity, Wichita Falls was a natural choice to serve as the local logistical hub, being the seat of Wichita County. Because office space was lacking, major stock transactions and mineral rights deals were conducted on street corners and in tents that served as makeshift headquarters for the new oil companies.

== Proposal and blueprints ==
The Newby–McMahon Building is a four-story brick building located near the railroad depot in downtown Wichita Falls, built in 1906 by Augustus Newby (1855–1909), a director of the Wichita Falls and Oklahoma City Railway Company. The oil-rig construction firm of J.D. McMahon, a petroleum landman and structural engineer from Philadelphia, was one of seven tenants whose offices were based in the original Newby Building.

According to local legend, when McMahon announced in 1919 that he would build a high-rise annex to the Newby Building as a solution to the newly wealthy city's urgent need for office space, investors were eager to invest in the project. McMahon collected US$200,000 (equivalent to $3.7 million in 2025) of investment capital from this group of naïve investors, promising to construct a high-rise office building across the street from the St. James Hotel.

Supposedly, the key to McMahon's swindle, and his successful defense in the ensuing lawsuit, was that legal documents listed the height as 480" (inches) as opposed to 480' (feet). Investors did not seem to notice, and McMahon never verbally stated that the actual height of the building would be 480 feet (150 m).

== Construction and ensuing legal battle ==
McMahon used his own construction crews to build the McMahon Building on the small, unused piece of property next to the Newby Building, without obtaining prior consent from the owner of the property, who lived in Oklahoma.

According to legend, investors brought a lawsuit against McMahon over the size of the building, but to their dismay, the real estate and construction deal was declared legally binding by a local judge. They did recover a small portion of their investment from the elevator company, which refused to honor the contract after learning how small the building was. No stairway was installed in the building upon its initial completion, as none was included in the original blueprints. Rather, a ladder was employed to gain access to the upper three floors.

By the time construction was complete, McMahon had left Wichita Falls and perhaps even Texas, taking with him the balance of the investors' money.

== Early occupancy and subsequent abandonment ==
In 1919, upon its completion and opening, the Newby–McMahon Building was an immediate source of great embarrassment to the city and its residents. The ground floor had six desks representing the six different companies that occupied the building as its original tenants.

Throughout most of the 1920s, the building housed only two firms. During the 1920s, the Newby–McMahon Building was featured in Robert Ripley's Ripley's Believe It or Not! syndicated column as "the world's littlest skyscraper", which is a name that has stuck with it ever since.

The oil industry would ultimately prove to be a resource curse to Wichita Falls, and the Texas oil boom ended only a few years later. The building was vacated, boarded up, and virtually forgotten in 1929 as the Great Depression struck North Texas and office space became relatively inexpensive to lease or purchase.

In 1931, a fire gutted the building, rendering it unusable for a number of years.

After the Great Depression, the building housed a succession of tenants, including barber shops and cafés. The building changed hands many times and was scheduled for demolition on several occasions, but escaped this fate apparently because a sufficient number of local residents came to its defense.

The building was eventually deeded to the city of Wichita Falls. As the building continued to deteriorate, in 1986 the city gave the building to the Wichita County Heritage Society (WCHS), with the hope that it would eventually be restored, making it a viable part of the Depot Square Historic District.

== Purchase and renovation ==
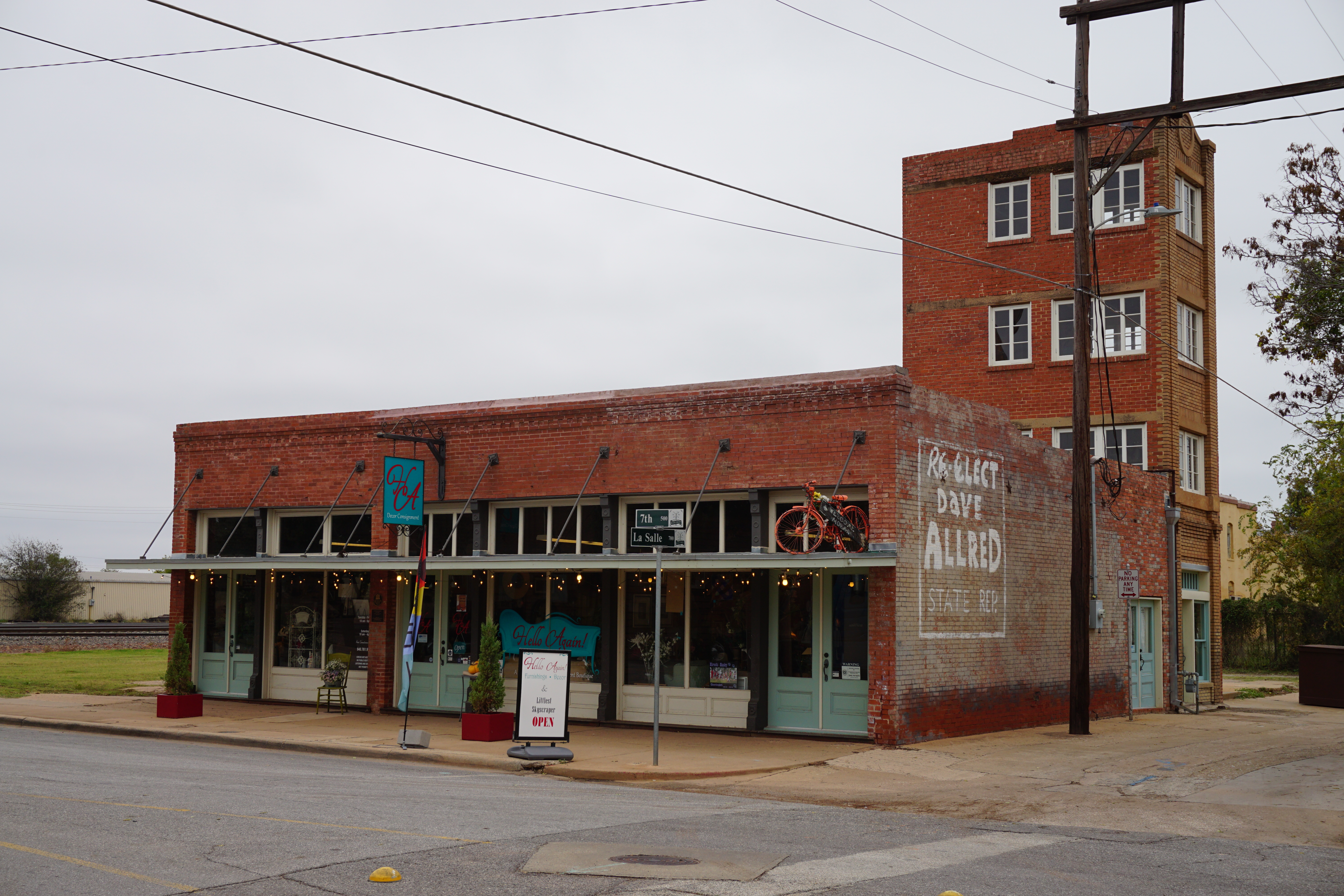
The Newby–McMahon Building and the Hello Again! storefront (October 2015)

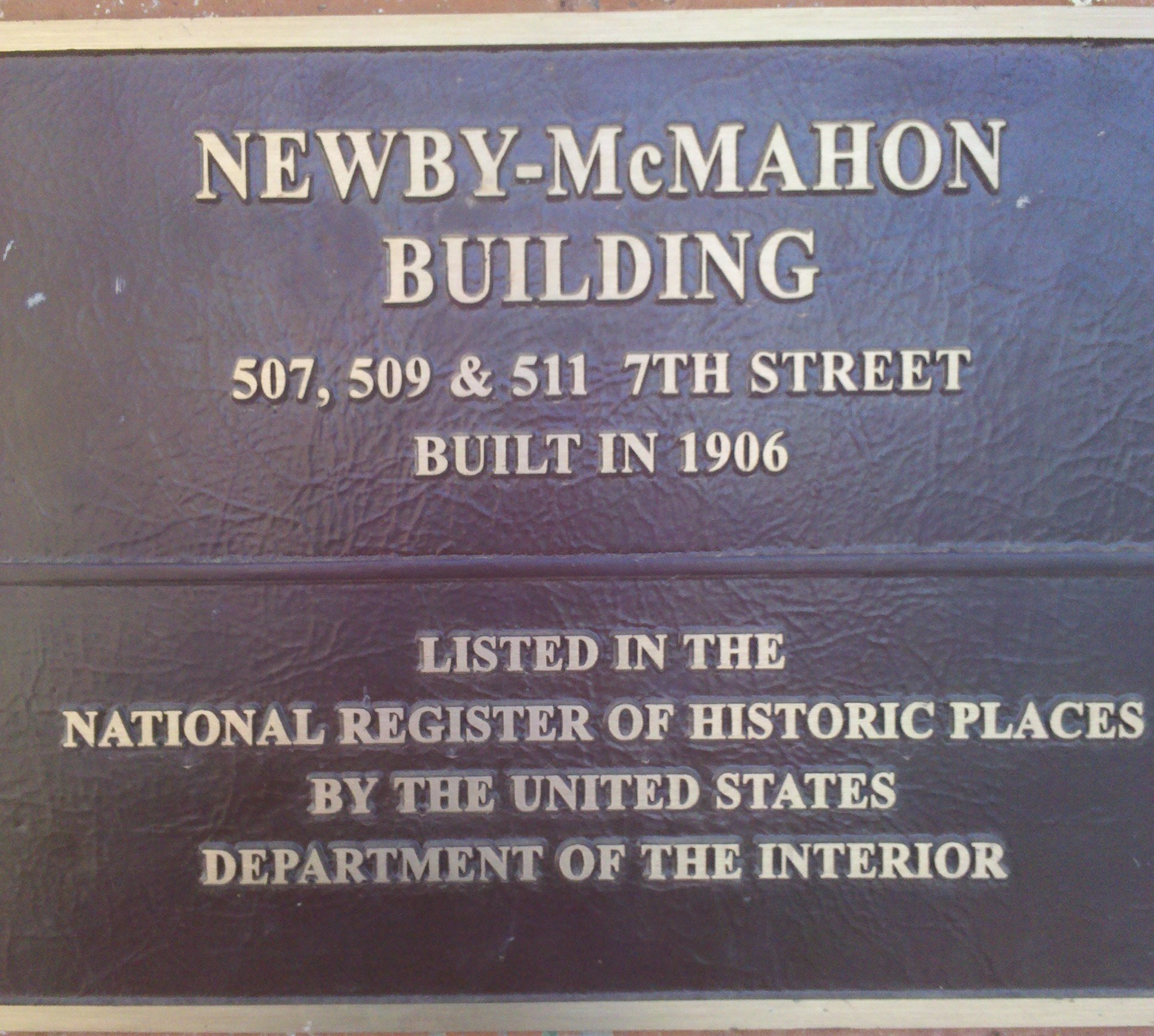
Plaque attached to the Newby–McMahon Building, also known as the "world's littlest skyscraper". This plaque refers to the building adjacent to the "skyscraper" which was completed in 1906; the "skyscraper" was completed in 1919.

By 1999, the Newby–McMahon Building had proven to be an excessive burden on the limited capital reserves of the WCHS. The following year, the city council hired the local architectural firm of Bundy, Young, Sims & Potter to stabilize the crumbling structure, amid steadily growing talk of demolishing the building. Dick Bundy and his partners became fascinated with the history and legacy of the building; they arranged a partnership with Marvin Groves Electric, another local business, to purchase the building.

In December 2000, the city council voted to allow the WCHS to sell the building to Marvin Groves for $3,748 (equivalent to $7,007 in 2025).

On June 11, 2003, a storm swept through Wichita Falls, bringing gusts of wind as strong as 97 miles per hour (156 km/h). A 15-foot (4.6 m) section of brick wall from the McMahon Building complex was knocked down. The damage from this storm was repaired, but full restoration of the building and the adjacent Newby Building was delayed until late 2005. In June of that year, the City Council granted $25,000 (equivalent to $41,212 in 2025) in funds from the city's tax increment financing fund, to be invested in the restoration of the McMahon Building. Restoration of the building is estimated to have cost more than $254,000 (equivalent to $418,717 in 2025), the remainder of which was paid by the owners (Bundy, Young, Sims & Potter, Inc., and Marvin Groves Electric).

== Current status ==
The Newby–McMahon Building has survived tornadoes, a fire, and decades of neglect. The building is currently part of the Depot Square Historic District of Wichita Falls, which has been declared a Texas Historic Landmark and listed on the National Register of Historic Places. The building has never met the criteria for the definition of a skyscraper, nor even that of a high-rise building.

After its renovation, the building was home to an antiques dealership, the Antique Wood, which opened in 2006 on the ground floor.

Since 2013, besides being a local tourist attraction, Hello Again, a furniture and home décor consignment boutique, has occupied the entire building. At times, floors of the building have been sublet to various local artisans.

The Newby–McMahon Building is among several historic buildings featured in the documentary film Wichita Falls: The Future of Our Past, a retrospective analysis of the city's architectural past produced in 2006 by Barry Levy, a public information officer with the city of Wichita Falls.

== See also ==
- History of the tallest buildings in the world
- Skyscraper Index
