= Rennicks =

Rennicks is a surname. Notable people with the surname include:

- Justin Rennicks (born 1999), American soccer player
- Ken Rennicks (born 1950), Irish Gaelic football player and coach
- Stephen Rennicks, Irish musician

== See also ==
- Rennick, another surname, given name, place name
- Rennicke, another surname
