= Iowa Park Consolidated Independent School District =

School district in Texas

Coordinates: 33.977°N 98.700°W

Iowa Park Consolidated Independent School District is a public school district based in Iowa Park, Texas, United States.

Located in central Wichita County, the district extends into a small portion of northwestern Archer County. In Wichita County the district includes Iowa Park, most of Pleasant Valley, and a small portion of Wichita Falls. In addition, the district also serves the communities of Kamay and Valley View.

In 2009, the school district was rated "recognized" by the Texas Education Agency.

== Schools ==
- Iowa Park High School (grades 9-12)
- W.F. George Middle School (grades 6-8)
- Bradford Elementary School (grades 3-5)
- Kidwell Elementary School prekindergarten-grade 2)
