= Edward Opp =

American photographer

Edward Oppenheimer
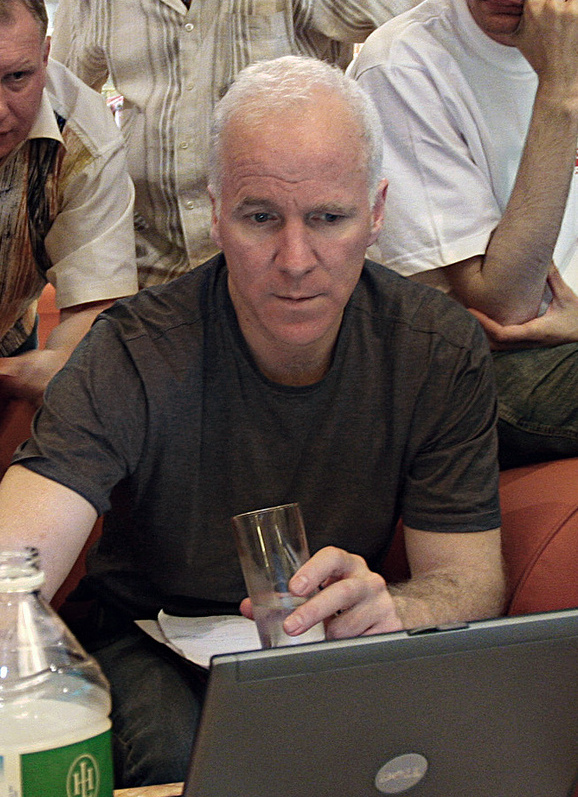
- Oppenheimer during a photo seminar in Dubai
- Born: June 4, 1957; Wichita Falls, Texas, U.S.
- Occupation: Photojournalism
- Title: Director of Photography, Kommersant Publishing House
- Awards: World Press Photo, Russian Golden Eye award

Edward Oppenheimer (born June 4, 1957) is an American photojournalist based in Moscow, Russia. He currently works as Director of Photography for the Russian media group Kommersant in Moscow.

== Biography ==
Edward Oppenheimer grew up in Klamath Falls, a small town in southern Oregon. At age 13 he lived a year with his Uncle and family in Yokohama, Japan. There he was given his first camera and became a member of the school's photography club. His last two years in high school he worked as a photographer/laboratory assistant at the local newspaper, The Herald and News. After that time Edward Oppenheimer would return to photography only after his move to Moscow, Russia in 1992.

In 1980 he graduated from Lewis and Clark College with honors in Economics and a second degree in French. The last few years in college he began studying classical guitar and after graduation went to Paris to study with Michel Sadanowski at «L'Universite Musicale Internationale de Paris». In 1983 a hand injury forced him to abandon musical studies. He moved to New York City and began working as a marketing analyst at Nabisco, during that time he took acting lessons at HB Studio in Greenwich Village. In 1985 he began studying programming and in 1987, following a visit to a friend in Sweden, took a job in Stockholm with a small startup company, Dynasoft, developing security software.

After a short tour of the Soviet Union in 1989 Oppenheimer soon returned to Leningrad to study Russian for a year at the University of Leningrad. Impressed by the events unfolding in the Soviet Union in 1991, he moved to Moscow in 1992 and found work as a photographer for Kommersant, one of the new generation of newspapers to appear on the wave of Perestroika. In Moscow he studied photography with Alexander Lapin. During the 1990s he also worked freelance for several leading western publications and photo agencies, such as Time magazine, The New York Times, The Washington Post, Fortune, Stern, Sunday Times, The Independent, Black Star, and Sipa Press.

Oppenheimer (Opp) photographed a wide variety of social themes in Russia –village life, orphans, medical institutions, prostitution. Oppenheimer made several trips to the North Caucasus region during the First Chechen War and covered the Budyonnovsk hospital hostage crisis in 1995 and Pervomayskoye crisis in 1996 for Time magazine. He was an accredited photographer at the Russian State Duma and the Kremlin during the presidency of Boris Yeltsin.

Edward Opp's photographic style has been described by some as documentary and "impassive…, frightful…, cold…, hypersensitive to the moment". He is currently Director of photography at the Kommersant Publishing House in Moscow which publishes a national daily newspaper, several news weekly and monthly periodicals, and is well known for its distinctive photographic approach. Oppenheimer (Opp) is a frequent guest of Russian cultural and political television discussion programs.

== Awards ==
- 1993, World Press Photo. Second Place, Spot News Stories – "Yeltsin storms the White House"
- 1996, All Russian Photo Contest Intеrfoto
  - Grand Prize Stories – "Hostages to Chechens in Buddonovsk"
  - First Place, People in the News – Boris Yeltsin and body guard Alexander Korzhakov
- 2003, Golden Eye of Russia, Russian Guild of Journalists

== Photo exhibitions and projects ==
- 2002 – Front Page Photos, Kommersant Photo exhibition, Moscow, Russia
- 2004 – Front Page Photos, Kommersant Photo exhibition, The Pushkin State Museum of Fine Arts, Moscow, Russia
- 2007 – Front Page Photos, Kommersant Photo exhibition, Moscow International Film Festival, Moscow, Russia
- 2008 – Edward Oppenheimer (Edward Opp) – View from Afar, personal photo exhibition, Moscow House of Photography, Moscow, Russia
- 2010 – Front Page Photos, Kommersant Newspaper Photo exhibition, Mikhaylovsky Theatre, Saint Petersburg
- 2012 – Liberty Camera, Kommersant Photo exhibition, Moscow House of Photography, Moscow, Russia
- Flash-Photo, Multimedia project, www.kommersant.ru
