= Renick Farm =

Renick Farm may refer to:

- Renick Farm (South Bloomfield, Ohio), listed on the National Register of Historic Places in Pickaway County, Ohio
- Renick Farm (Renick, West Virginia), listed on the National Register of Historic Places in Greenbrier County, West Virginia
