= Frank Renick =

American politician

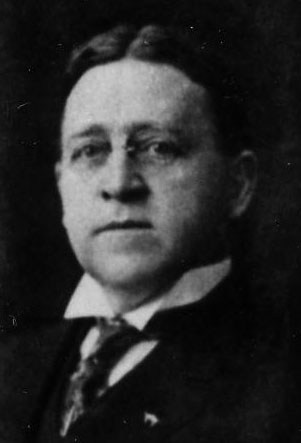
- Renick in 1917

Member of the Washington State Senate for the 35th district
- In office 1919–1923

Member of the Washington House of Representatives from the 45th district
- In office 1905–1911; 1915–1919

Personal details
- Born: August 4, 1864 Hartford, Connecticut, United States
- Died: May 6, 1921 (aged 56) Seattle, Washington, United States
- Party: Republican

Frank H. Renick (August 4, 1864 – May 6, 1921) was an American politician in the state of Washington. He served in the Washington State Senate and Washington House of Representatives.
