= Rennick =

Rennick is a surname. Notable people with the surname include:

- Dave Rennick (born 1983), Australian musician
- Elizabeth Rennick (1833–1923), British born Australian suffragist
- Gerard Rennick (born 1970), Australian politician

== See also ==
- Diana Rennik (born 1985), Estonian figure skater
- Rennicks, surname
