= Rennicke =

Rennicke is a surname. Notable people with the surname include:

- Frank Rennicke (born 1964), German songwriter and ballad singer
- John Rennicke (1929–2007), American basketball player

== See also ==
- Rennicks, another surname
- Rennick, another surname, given name, and place name
