= KWFB (FM) =

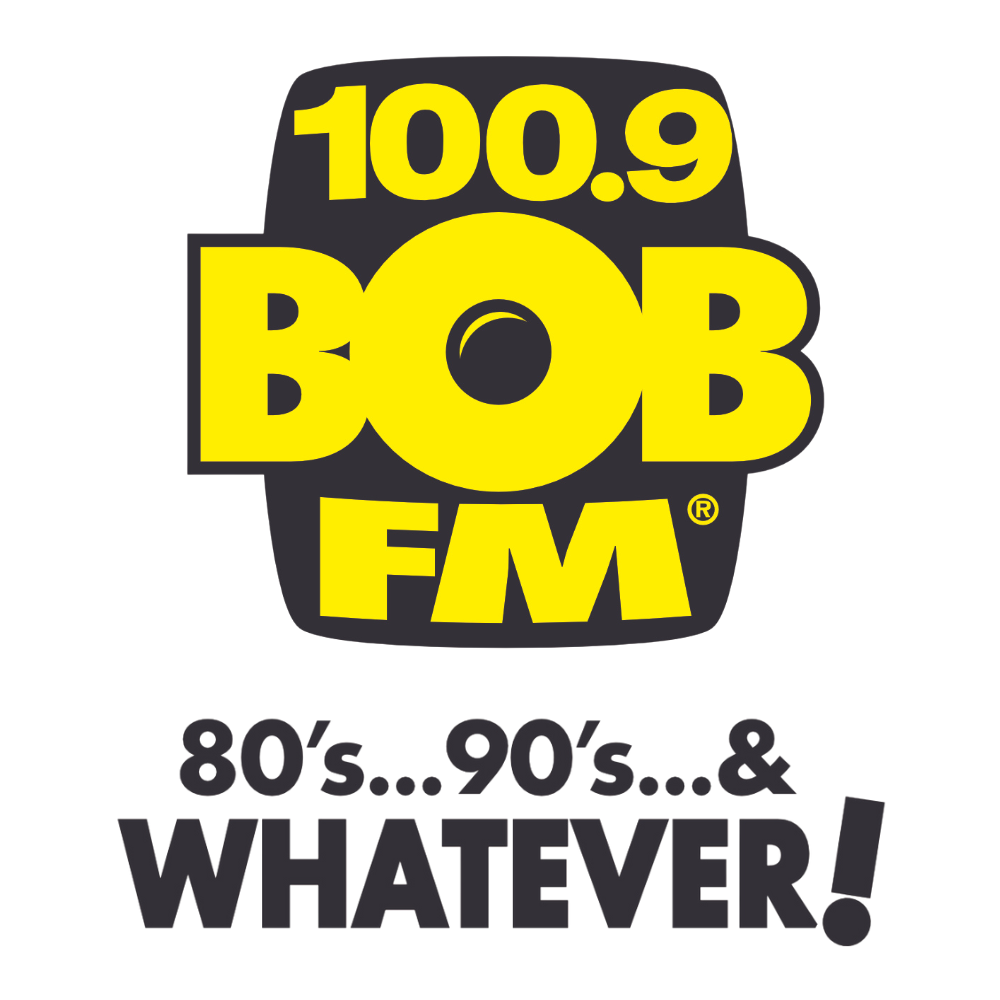
- Holliday, Texas; United States
- Broadcast area: Wichita Falls, Texas
- Frequency: 100.9 MHz
- Branding: 100.9 KWFB

Programming
- Format: Adult hits

Ownership
- Owner: Falls Radio, LLC (Balla & Stewart) and Mortons; (Kixc-FM L.L.C.)
- Sister stations: KXXN

History
- First air date: August 29, 1981; 44 years ago
- Former call signs: KIXC-FM (1981–1984); KQTX (1984–1986); KIXC-FM (1986–2007)
- Call sign meaning: Wichita Falls Bob

Technical information
- Licensing authority: FCC
- Facility ID: 24249
- Class: C3
- ERP: 19500
- HAAT: 117.5 meters (385 ft)
- Transmitter coordinates: 33°49′42.00″N 98°40′13.00″W

Links
- Public license information: Public file; LMS
- Website: 1009kwfb.com

KWFB (100.9 MHz) is an FM radio station licensed to Holliday, Texas, United States, the station serves the Wichita Falls area. The station is currently owned by Falls Media, LLC. Studios are located along Kemp Boulevard, south of downtown Wichita Falls and just west of Midwestern State University, and the transmitter is located south of Iowa Park.

== History ==
The station began as KIXC-FM in Quanah, Texas in the Fall of 1981. The station operated in Quanah as a class A station (3,000 watts max, later 6,000 watts). On 1984-07-02, the station changed its call sign to KQTX and on 1986-07-18 to KIXC-FM. In 2000 the station was sold to KIXC-FM LLC, a limited liability company owned by the Johnson family of Houston, Texas and the Mortons of Missouri City, Texas. The station changed formats to Oldies and changed classes to C2 (50,000 watts at 500 feet) from a new site between Quanah and Vernon, Texas.

In 2008 the station changed to class C3 at a new site near the Wichita Falls city limits. Also in 2008, the Johnson family sold the station to Falls Radio LLC, owned by Dan Balla and David Stewart. In 2012, the company changed its name to Falls Media, LLC.

KWFB (FM) studios are co-located with sister station KXXN (FM) "Big Country 97.5".

The station was temporarily rebranded as "100.9 FM" on February 8, 2022, continuing with the adult hits format, but using cryptic liners between songs claiming "Bob" went missing and asking if anyone knew where he went.

On March 6, 2022, KWFB rebranded as "100.9 Jack FM".

On December 6, 2023, KWFB dropped the "Jack FM" format and began playing Christmas music, branded as "Santa 100.9". On December 27, KWFB posted to their social media platforms to "Bring Back BOB", asking listeners to "sign" said petition online at bringbackbobnow.com and listen in Monday morning to see if it was successful. Prior to the switch, the station continued stunting, playing songs by artists named Bob. On January 1, 2024, KWFB relaunched as Bob FM.
