= Renick Bell =

- Born: Wichita Falls, Texas, U.S.
- Genres: Electronic; experimental; post-industrial; chopped and screwed; grime
- Instrument(s): live coding, computer, synthesizer, drums
- Years active: 1996–present
- Labels: UIQ; Halcyon Veil; Seagrave; Quantum Natives; NX Records; Haunter Records

Renick Bell is an American musician, programmer, and teacher based in Saigon,Vietnam, notable as a pioneer of live coded music performance including at algoraves, and for his algorithmic music releases. Bell creates his music using his self-built live coding system Conductive.

== Career ==
=== Premier of Algorave in Asia ===
The very first algoraves in Asia, organized by Renick Bell, were held in Tokyo and Hong Kong

- January 5, 2014 in Tokyo
- May 20, 2016 in Hong Kong

== Releases (Algorave) ==
Renick Bell's releases include an

- EP for Lee Gamble's UIQ label in 2016;
- LPs for Rabit's Halcyon Veil;
- Seagrave Records in 2018.

== Live coding performances ==
Some notable performances include a duo with Fis at the Berlin Atonal festival in Berlin in August 2017 and a solo performance at the Unsound Festival in Krakow in 2018.
