= Iowa Park, Texas =

- City
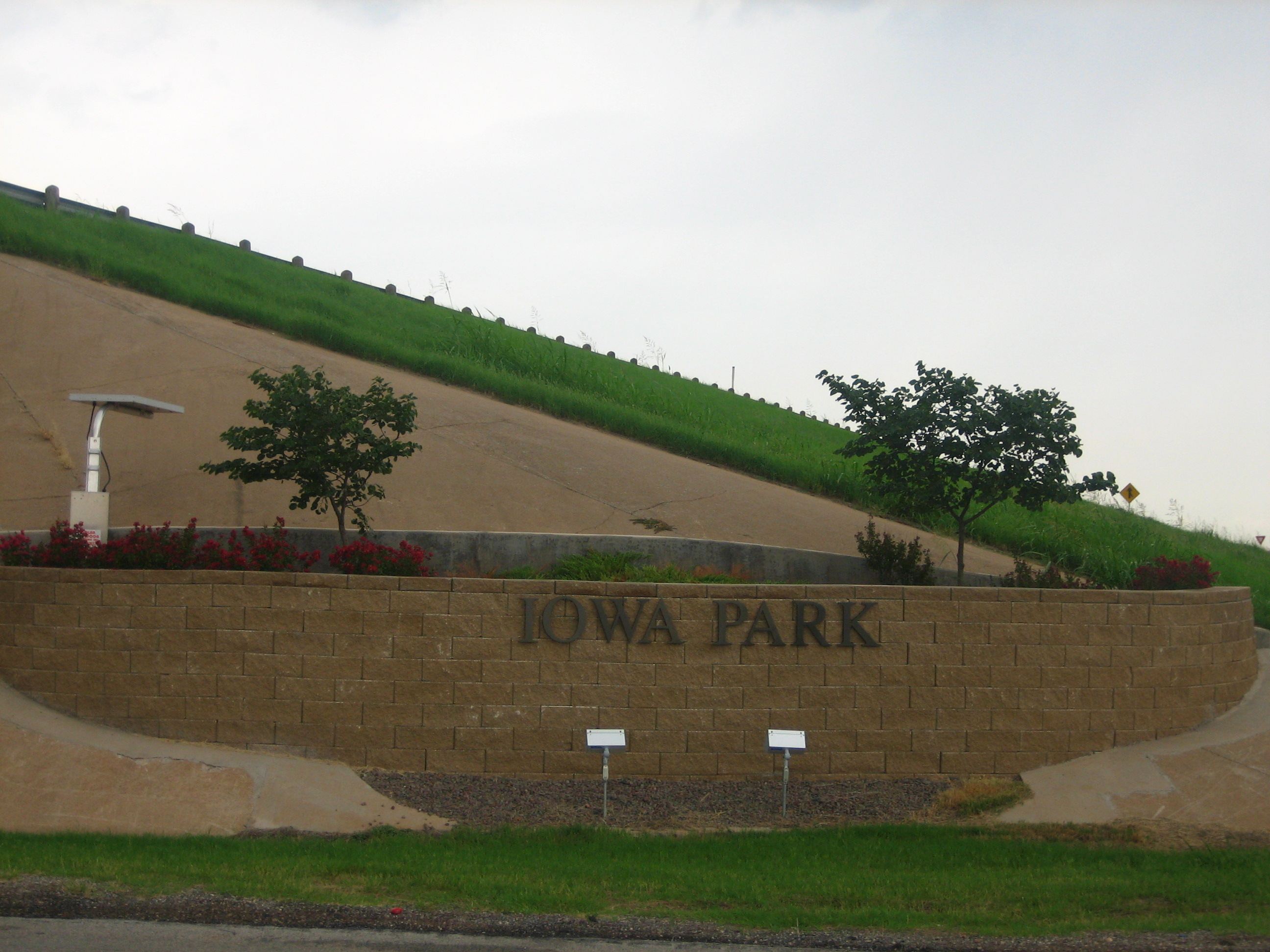
- Entrance to Iowa Park

- Location of Iowa Park, Texas
- Coordinates: 33°57′42″N 98°40′52″W
- Country: United States
- State: Texas
- County: Wichita

Area
  - Total: 4.44 sq mi (11.51 km^{2})
  - Land: 4.06 sq mi (10.51 km^{2})
  - Water: 0.39 sq mi (1.01 km^{2})
- Elevation: 1,053 ft (321 m)

Population (2020)
  - Total: 6,535
  - Density: 1,611.2/sq mi (622.09/km^{2})
- Time zone: UTC-6 (Central (CST))
  - Summer (DST): UTC-5 (CDT)
- ZIP code: 76367
- Area code: 940
- FIPS code: 48-36104
- GNIS feature ID: 2410112
- Website: iowapark.com

Iowa Park is a city in Wichita County, Texas, United States. It is part of the Wichita Falls, Texas metropolitan statistical area. The population was 6,535 at the 2020 census.

== History ==
Iowa Park was founded in 1888 alongside the tracks of the Fort Worth and Denver City Railway by D. C. and A. J. Kolp. Originally called Daggett Switch, it soon became a shipping point for cotton and wheat. Hard times came in the early 1890s when a drought hit, but by 1900, the town had a significant population.

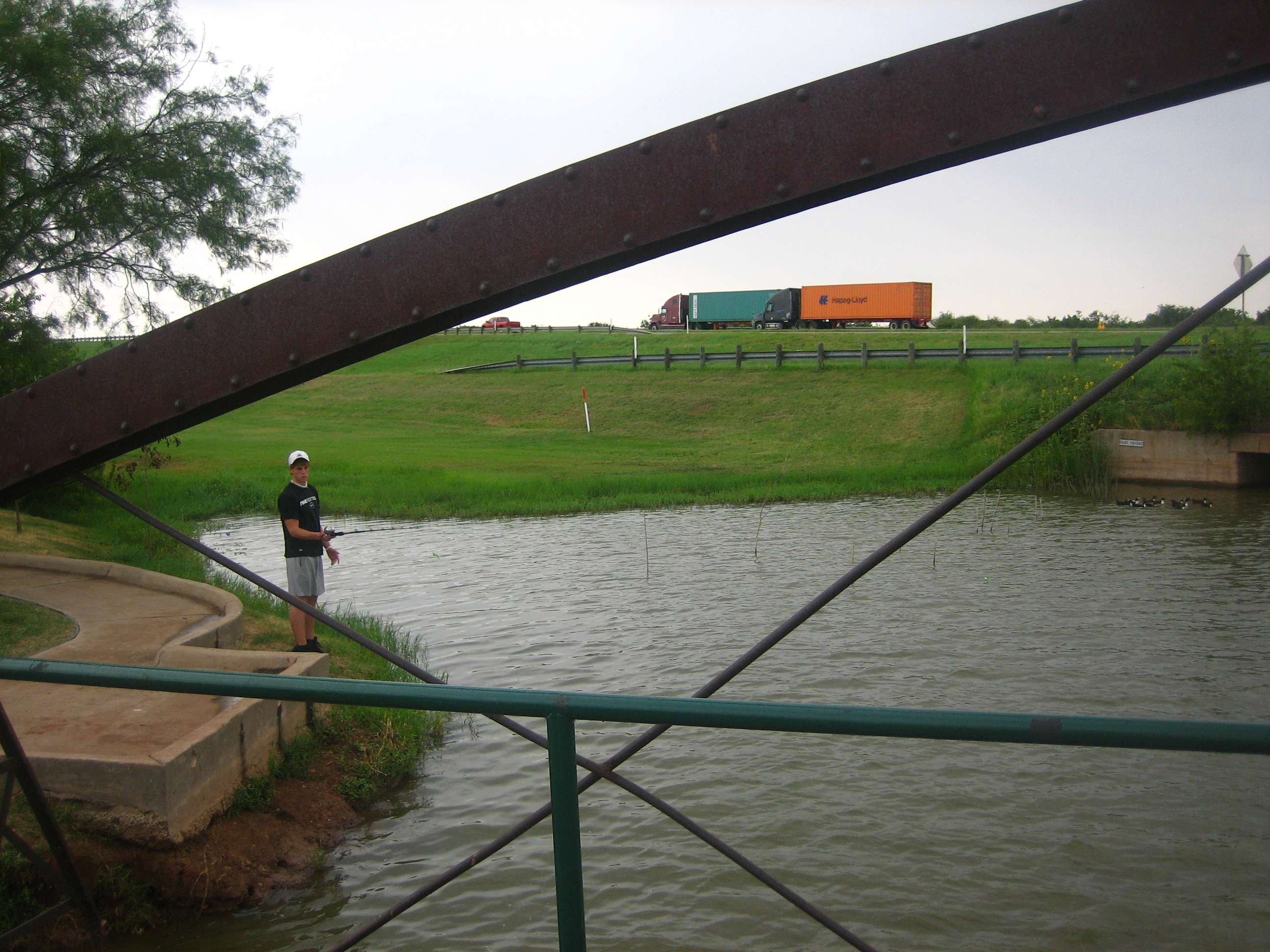
A young fisherman at Gordon Lake in Oscar Park (summer 2008)

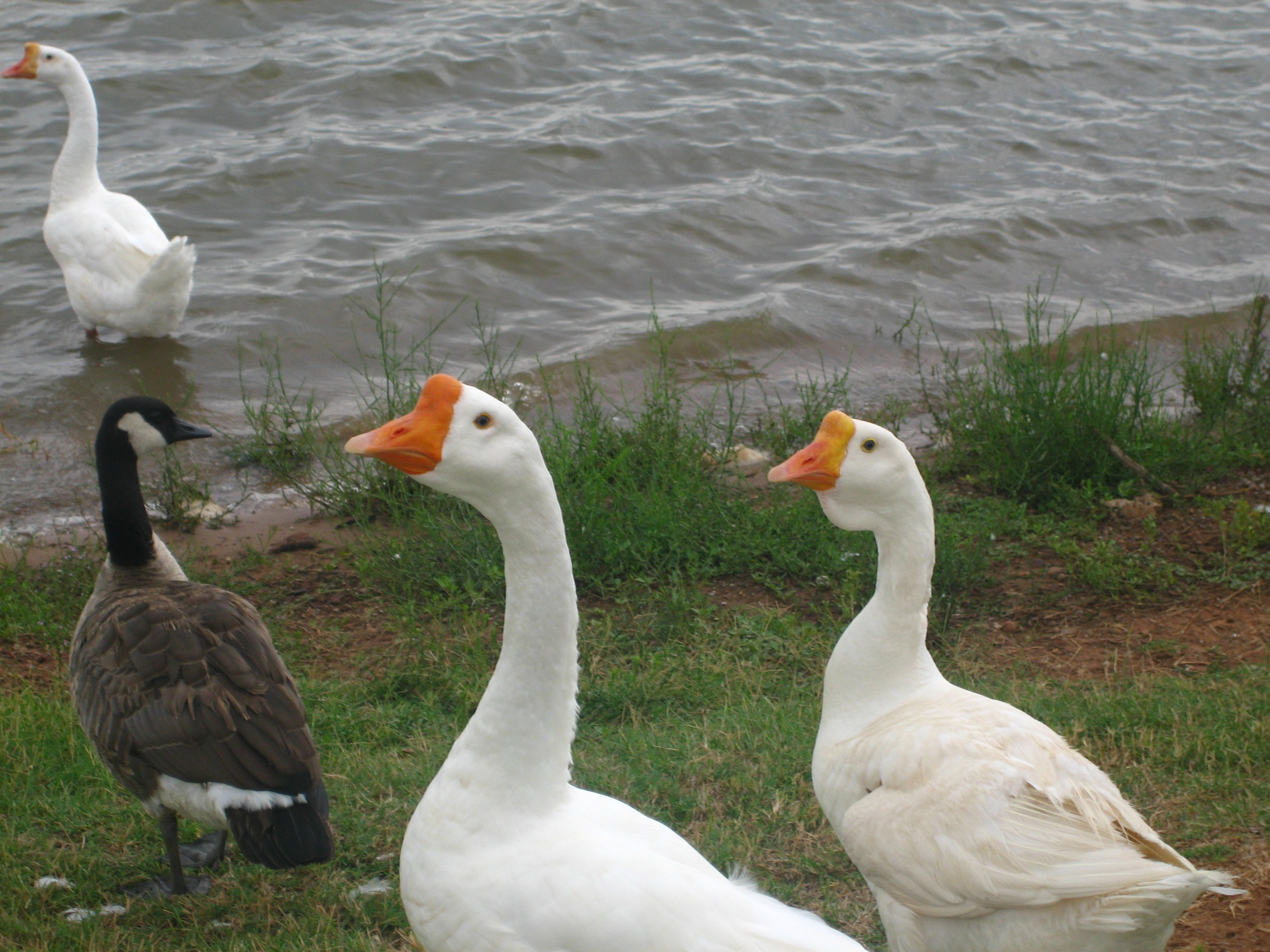
Geese approach parkgoers at Gordon Lake.

The population fell during the early part of the century, but an oil discovery in 1918 reversed the dip. By 1926, the population was staying higher. A concrete highway connecting Iowa Park with Wichita Falls was built in 1927. In the mid-1930s, Iowa Park maintained its population, while most other towns declined.

Sheppard Air Force Base provided a minor drawback in the 1950s, but by the end of the decade, the population was still holding up. The late 1960s brought two state football championships and a 20% growth in population which continued into the '70s.

== Geography ==
According to the United States Census Bureau, the city has a total area of 4.0 square miles (10.4 km^{2}), of which 3.6 square miles (9.4 km^{2}) are land and 0.4 square mile (1.0 km^{2}) of which (9.68%) is covered by water.

== Demographics ==
Historical population
Census	Pop.	Note	%±
1890	424		—
1910	603		—
1920	2,041		238.5%
1930	2,009		−1.6%
1940	1,980		−1.4%
1950	2,110		6.6%
1960	3,295		56.2%
1970	5,796		75.9%
1980	6,184		6.7%
1990	6,069		−1.9%
2000	6,432		6.0%
2010	6,355		−1.2%
2020	6,535		2.8%
U.S. Decennial Census

=== 2020 census ===
As of the 2020 census, Iowa Park had a population of 6,535, 2,606 households, and 1,605 families residing in the city. The median age was 38.6 years; 25.9% of residents were under the age of 18 and 17.3% of residents were 65 years of age or older. For every 100 females there were 97.5 males, and for every 100 females age 18 and over there were 93.6 males age 18 and over.

98.3% of residents lived in urban areas, while 1.7% lived in rural areas.

There were 2,606 households in Iowa Park, of which 34.3% had children under the age of 18 living in them. Of all households, 50.7% were married-couple households, 17.6% were households with a male householder and no spouse or partner present, and 26.2% were households with a female householder and no spouse or partner present. About 27.1% of all households were made up of individuals and 12.6% had someone living alone who was 65 years of age or older.

There were 2,813 housing units, of which 7.4% were vacant. The homeowner vacancy rate was 1.0% and the rental vacancy rate was 8.3%.

Racial composition as of the 2020 census
Race	Number	Percent
White	5,728	87.7%
Black or African American	51	0.8%
American Indian and Alaska Native	84	1.3%
Asian	45	0.7%
Native Hawaiian and Other Pacific Islander	2	0.0%
Some other race	105	1.6%
Two or more races	520	8.0%
Hispanic or Latino (of any race)	467	7.1%

== Education ==
The City of Iowa Park is served by the Iowa Park Consolidated Independent School District. The schools within this district include Kidwell Elementary, Bradford Elementary, W.F. George Middle School, and Iowa Park High School.

== Government and infrastructure ==
The United States Postal Service operates the Iowa Park Post Office.

The Texas Department of Criminal Justice operates the James V. Allred Unit in Wichita Falls, in proximity to Iowa Park.

== Climate ==
The climate in this area is characterized by hot, humid summers and generally mild to cool winters. According to the Köppen climate classification system, Iowa Park has a humid subtropical climate, Cfa on climate maps.

== See also ==
- Lake Iowa Park
