= Wichita Falls, Texas =

- City
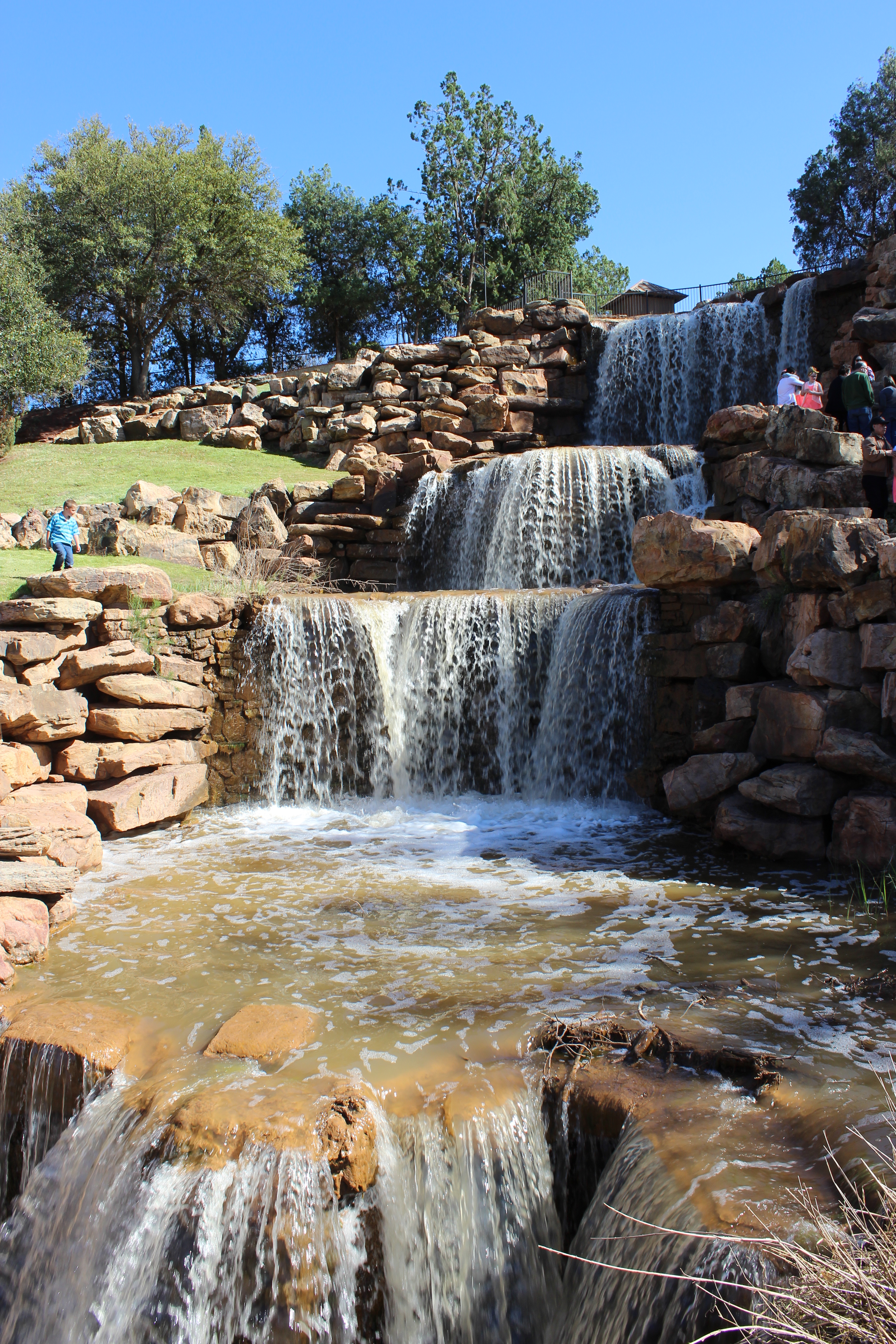
- Man-made replacement of the original waterfall in Lucy Park

- Flag

- Location of Wichita Falls within Wichita County, Texas

- Location within Texas Location within the United States
- Coordinates: 33°54′43.8″N 98°29′41.1″W
- Country: United States
- State: Texas
- County: Wichita

Government
  - Type: Council–manager
  - Mayor: Tim Short (R)

Area
  - City: 72.04 sq mi (186.57 km^{2})
  - Land: 72.01 sq mi (186.51 km^{2})
  - Water: 0.023 sq mi (0.06 km^{2})
- Elevation: 951 ft (290 m)

Population (2020)
  - City: 102,316
  - Rank: US: 315th
  - Density: 1,420.8/sq mi (548.58/km^{2})
  - Urban: 99,437 (US: 319th)
  - Metro: 151,306 (US: 286th)
- Time zone: UTC−6 (CST)
  - Summer (DST): UTC−5 (CDT)
- ZIP Codes: 76301–76311
- Area code: 940
- FIPS code: 48-79000
- GNIS feature ID: 2412261
- Website: wichitafallstx.gov

Wichita Falls (/ˈwɪtʃɪtɑː/ WITCH-ih-tah) is a city in and the county seat of Wichita County, Texas, United States. It is the principal city of the Wichita Falls metropolitan statistical area, which encompasses all of Archer, Clay, and Wichita Counties. According to the 2020 census, it had a population of 102,316, making it the 43rd-most populous city in Texas. Wichita Falls is home to Midwestern State University, enrolling more than 5,500 students.

== History ==
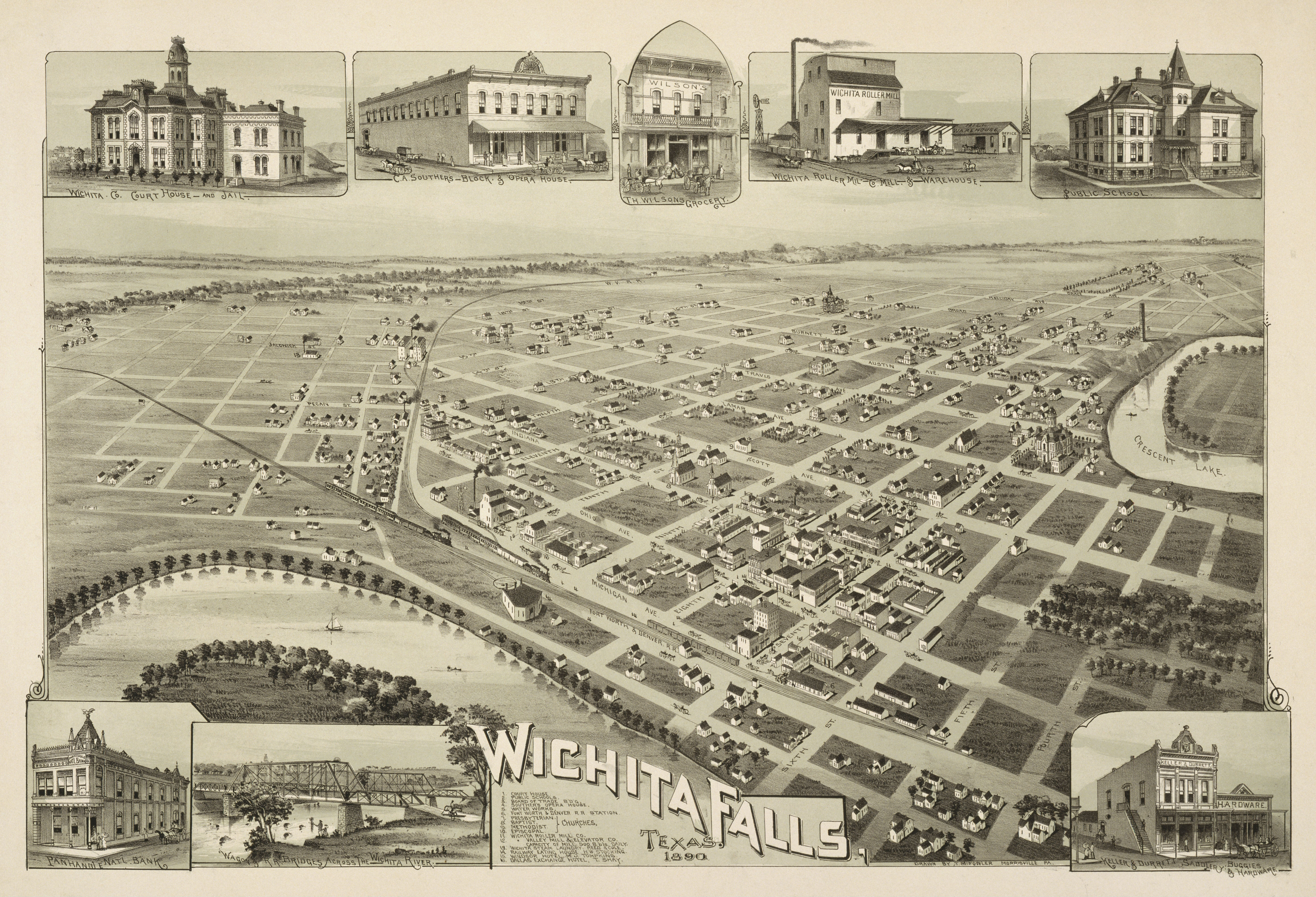
Map of Wichita Falls in 1890

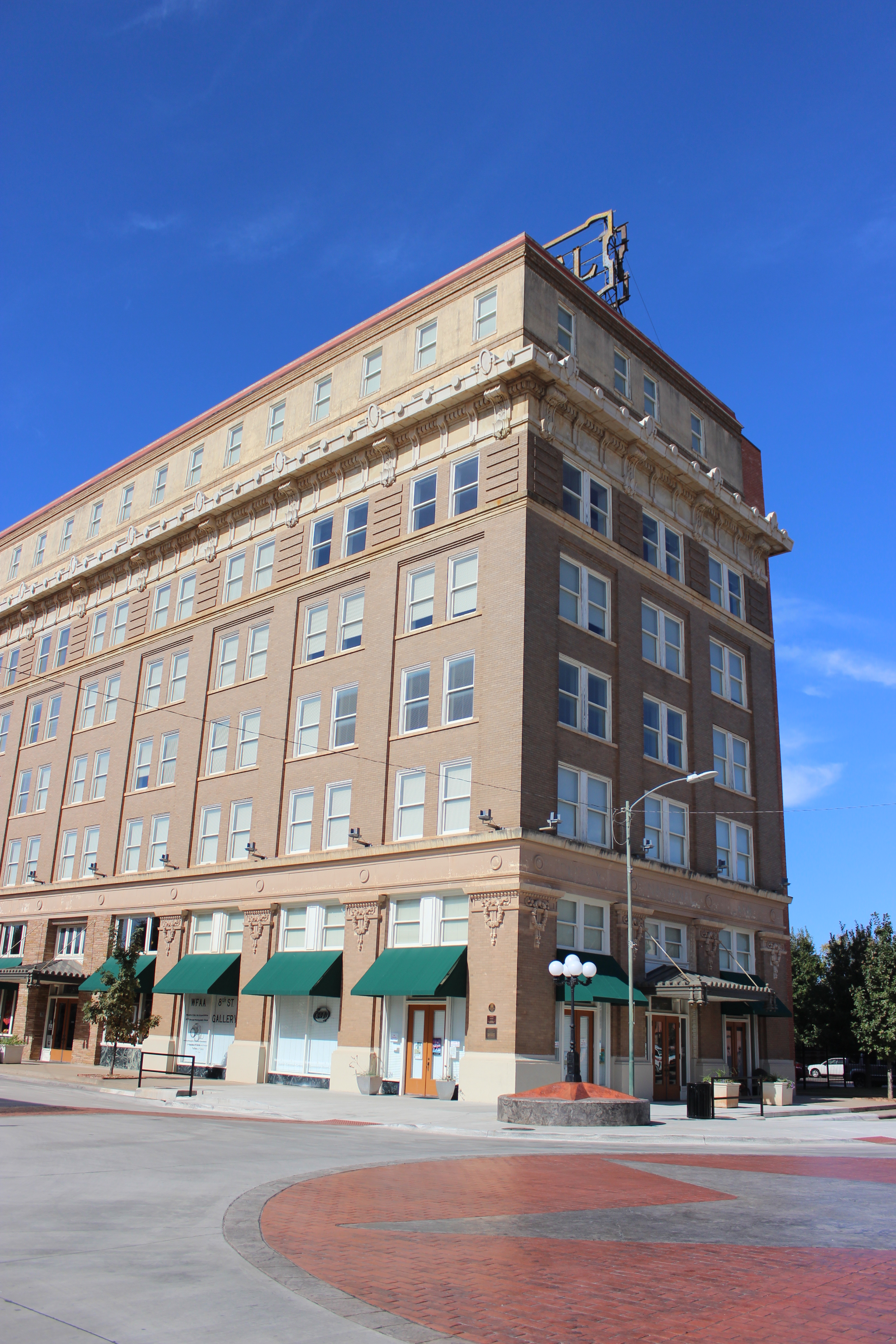
Kemp-Kell Building, circa 1910, now known as the Holt Hotel, was one of the first five-story office buildings in the city.

From the early 18th century to the mid 19th century, the Wichita Falls area was inhabited by the Wichita and the Comanche people. The Spanish called the lands controlled by the Comanche as Comancheria. The Wichita were forced onto a reservation in Oklahoma after 1859. The last battle with the Comanche in this area occurred in 1872 and the Comanche were finally defeated in 1874.

Anglo American presence in the area began in the 1860s. The future city was platted and named Wichita Falls on September 27, 1876, as the Wichita River runs through the area and a waterfall was in the river's course in 1876. The first permanent resident arrived in 1879. In 1886, a flood destroyed the original waterfall. The city built a 54 ft (16 m) high artificial waterfall in 1987 beside the river in Lucy Park.

On the day the city was named in 1876, a sale of town lots was held at what is now the corner of Seventh and Ohio Streets – the birthplace of the city. The Fort Worth & Denver City Railway arrived in September 1882, the same year the city became the county seat of Wichita County. The city grew westwards from the original FW&DC train depot which was located at the northwest corner of Seventh Street and the FW&DC. This area is now referred to as the Depot Square Historic District, which has been declared a Texas Historic Landmark.

The early history of Wichita Falls well into the 20th century also rests on the work of two entrepreneurs, Joseph A. Kemp and his brother-in-law, Frank Kell. Kemp and Kell were pioneers in food processing and retailing, flour milling, railroads, cattle, banking, and oil.

The city is home to the Newby-McMahon Building (otherwise known as the "world's littlest skyscraper"), constructed downtown in 1919 and featured in Robert Ripley's Ripley's Believe It or Not!.

Downtown Wichita Falls was the city's main shopping area for many years. Those shops lost ground to the creation of new shopping centers throughout the city beginning with Parker Square in 1953 and other similar developments during the 1960s and 1970s, culminating with the opening of Sikes Senter Mall in 1974. The city has been seeking funding to rebuild and restore the downtown area since 2010.

Wichita Falls was once home to offices of several oil companies and related industries, along with oil refineries operated by the Continental Oil Company (now ConocoPhillips) until 1952 and Panhandle Oil Company (founded in Wichita Falls, sold to American Petrofina in 1965). Both firms continued to use a portion of their former refineries as gasoline/oil terminal facilities for many years.

=== 1964 tornado ===
A powerful F5-rated tornado hit the northern and northwestern portions of Wichita Falls, along with Sheppard Air Force Base during the afternoon of April 3, 1964 (later referred to as "Black Friday"). As the first violent tornado on record to hit the Wichita Falls area, it left seven dead and more than 100 injured. Additionally, the tornado caused roughly $15 million ($153.2M in 2025 dollars) in property damage with about 225 homes destroyed and another 250 damaged. It was rated F5, the highest rating on the Fujita scale, but it is overshadowed by the 1979 tornado.

=== 1979 tornado ===
An F4 tornado struck the heavily populated southern sections of Wichita Falls in the late afternoon on Tuesday, April 10, 1979 (known as "Terrible Tuesday"). It was part of an outbreak that produced 30 tornadoes around the region. Despite having nearly an hour's advance warning that severe weather was imminent, 42 people were killed (including 25 in vehicles) and 1,800 were injured because it arrived just as many people were driving home from work. It left 20,000 people homeless and caused $400 million in damage, a U.S. record not topped by an individual tornado until the F5 Moore–Oklahoma City tornado of May 3, 1999.

== Geography and climate ==
Wichita Falls is about 15 miles (24 km) south of the border with Oklahoma, 115 mi (185 km) northwest of Fort Worth, and 140 mi (230 km) southwest of Oklahoma City. According to the United States Census Bureau, the city has a total area of 70.71 square miles (183.1 km^{2}), of which 0.02 sq mi (0.052 km^{2}) (0.03%) is covered by water.

Wichita Falls experiences a humid subtropical climate (Köppen climate classification Cfa), featuring long, very hot and humid summers, and cool winters. The city has some of the highest summer daily maximum temperatures in the entire U.S. outside of the Desert Southwest. Temperatures have hit 100 °F (38 °C) as early as March 27 and as late as October 17, but more typically reach that level on 28 days annually, with 102 days of 90 °F (32 °C) or higher annually; the average window for the latter mark is April 9–October 10. However, 59 to 60 nights of freezing lows occur, and an average of 4.8 days where the high does not rise above freezing. The monthly daily average temperature ranges from 42.0 °F (5.6 °C) in January to 84.4 °F (29.1 °C) in July. The record low temperature is −12 °F (−24 °C) on January 4, 1947. The highest recorded temperature is 117 °F (47 °C) on June 28, 1980. Snowfall is sporadic and averages 4.1 in (10 cm) per season, while rainfall is typically greatest in early summer.

From 2010 through 2013, Wichita Falls, along with a large portion of the south-central U.S., experienced a persistent drought. In September 2011, Wichita Falls became the first Texas city to have 100 days of 100 °F (38 °C) or higher within one year. (Note: The previous record was 79 in 1980.) On every day from June 22 to August 12, the temperature reached 100 °F or higher, and from May 27 to September 3, the temperature reached 90 °F or higher. In addition, the all-time warm daily minimum of 88 °F (31 °C) was set on July 26, and June, July, and August of that year were all the hottest on record.

During the 2015 Texas–Oklahoma floods, Wichita Falls broke its all-time record for the wettest month, with 17.00 inches of rain recorded in May 2015.

Climate data for Wichita Falls, Texas (Wichita Falls Regional Airport), 1991–2020 normals, extremes 1923–present
Month	Jan	Feb	Mar	Apr	May	Jun	Jul	Aug	Sep	Oct	Nov	Dec	Year
Record high °F (°C)	87 (31)	94 (34)	100 (38)	103 (39)	110 (43)	117 (47)	115 (46)	113 (45)	112 (44)	102 (39)	92 (33)	91 (33)	117 (47)
Mean maximum °F (°C)	76.9 (24.9)	81.9 (27.7)	88.2 (31.2)	91.9 (33.3)	97.4 (36.3)	101.1 (38.4)	105.5 (40.8)	105.2 (40.7)	100.4 (38.0)	93.4 (34.1)	82.8 (28.2)	77.2 (25.1)	107.3 (41.8)
Mean daily maximum °F (°C)	54.7 (12.6)	59.0 (15.0)	67.9 (19.9)	76.0 (24.4)	83.9 (28.8)	92.0 (33.3)	97.2 (36.2)	96.6 (35.9)	88.3 (31.3)	77.3 (25.2)	65.2 (18.4)	55.7 (13.2)	76.2 (24.5)
Daily mean °F (°C)	42.4 (5.8)	46.3 (7.9)	54.7 (12.6)	62.8 (17.1)	71.8 (22.1)	80.1 (26.7)	84.7 (29.3)	84.1 (28.9)	76.0 (24.4)	64.6 (18.1)	52.7 (11.5)	43.7 (6.5)	63.7 (17.6)
Mean daily minimum °F (°C)	30.0 (−1.1)	33.6 (0.9)	41.6 (5.3)	49.6 (9.8)	59.7 (15.4)	68.3 (20.2)	72.2 (22.3)	71.5 (21.9)	63.8 (17.7)	51.9 (11.1)	40.2 (4.6)	31.8 (−0.1)	51.2 (10.7)
Mean minimum °F (°C)	15.7 (−9.1)	19.0 (−7.2)	24.3 (−4.3)	34.4 (1.3)	44.9 (7.2)	59.9 (15.5)	65.3 (18.5)	63.5 (17.5)	50.7 (10.4)	35.9 (2.2)	24.8 (−4.0)	17.3 (−8.2)	11.8 (−11.2)
Record low °F (°C)	−12 (−24)	−8 (−22)	6 (−14)	24 (−4)	35 (2)	50 (10)	54 (12)	53 (12)	38 (3)	21 (−6)	14 (−10)	−7 (−22)	−12 (−24)
Average precipitation inches (mm)	1.20 (30)	1.40 (36)	2.02 (51)	2.50 (64)	3.81 (97)	3.35 (85)	2.02 (51)	2.53 (64)	2.99 (76)	2.88 (73)	1.63 (41)	1.56 (40)	27.89 (708)
Average snowfall inches (cm)	0.7 (1.8)	1.1 (2.8)	0.2 (0.51)	0.0 (0.0)	0.0 (0.0)	0.0 (0.0)	0.0 (0.0)	0.0 (0.0)	0.0 (0.0)	0.0 (0.0)	0.3 (0.76)	0.8 (2.0)	3.1 (7.87)
Average precipitation days (≥ 0.01 in)	4.6	4.9	6.5	6.6	9.1	7.3	5.2	6.0	6.3	6.9	5.2	4.5	73.1
Average snowy days (≥ 0.1 in)	0.3	0.5	0.1	0.0	0.0	0.0	0.0	0.0	0.0	0.0	0.2	0.5	1.6
Source 1: NOAA
Source 2: National Weather Service

== Demographics ==
Historical population
Census	Pop.	Note	%±
1890	1,978		—
1900	2,480		25.4%
1910	8,200		230.6%
1920	40,079		388.8%
1930	43,690		9.0%
1940	45,112		3.3%
1950	68,042		50.8%
1960	101,724		49.5%
1970	96,265		−5.4%
1980	94,201		−2.1%
1990	96,259		2.2%
2000	104,197		8.2%
2010	104,553		0.3%
2020	102,316		−2.1%
U.S. Decennial Census; Texas Almanac: 1850–2000

=== Racial and ethnic composition ===
Wichita Falls city, Texas – Racial and ethnic composition Note: the US Census treats Hispanic/Latino as an ethnic category. This table excludes Latinos from the racial categories and assigns them to a separate category. Hispanics/Latinos may be of any race.
Race / Ethnicity (NH = Non-Hispanic)	Pop 2000	Pop 2010	Pop 2020	% 2000	% 2010	% 2020
White alone (NH)	71,782	66,509	57,750	68.89%	63.61%	56.44%
Black or African American alone (NH)	12,705	12,812	12,838	12.19%	12.25%	12.55%
Native American or Alaska Native alone (NH)	696	790	737	0.67%	0.76%	0.72%
Asian alone (NH)	2,256	2,396	2,464	2.17%	2.29%	2.41%
Pacific Islander alone (NH)	90	82	124	0.09%	0.08%	0.12%
Some Other Race alone (NH)	128	98	409	0.12%	0.09%	0.40%
Mixed race or Multiracial (NH)	1,970	2,095	4,813	1.89%	2.00%	4.70%
Hispanic or Latino (any race)	14,570	19,771	23,181	13.98%	18.91%	22.66%
Total	104,197	104,553	102,316	100.00%	100.00%	100.00%

=== 2020 census ===
As of the 2020 census, Wichita Falls had a population of 102,316 and a median age of 35.0 years; 21.7% of the residents were under 18 and 15.3% were 65 or older. The female/male ratio was 1:1.068 overall and 1:1.076 for those 18 and over.

About 93.7% of residents lived in urban areas, while 6.3% lived in rural areas.

Of the 38,266 households in Wichita Falls, 29.8% had children under living in them, 41.1% were married-couple households, 20.5% were households with a male householder and no spouse or partner present, and 31.4% were households with a female householder and no spouse or partner present. About 32.4% of all households were made up of individuals, and 12.3% had someone living alone who was 65 years of age or older.

The city had 43,625 housing units, of which 12.3% were vacant; the homeowner vacancy rate was 2.4% and the rental vacancy rate was 13.1%.

Racial composition as of the 2020 census
Race	Number	Percentage
White	63,852	62.4%
Black or African American	13,315	13.0%
American Indian and Alaska Native	1,142	1.1%
Asian	2,547	2.5%
Native Hawaiian and other Pacific Islander	154	0.2%
Some other race	9,667	9.4%
Two or more races	11,639	11.4%
Hispanic or Latino (of any race)	23,181	22.7%

=== 2022 American Community Survey ===
As of the 2022 American Community Survey estimates, 102,659 people and 38,057 households were in the city. The population density was 1,421.2 inhabitants per square mile (548.7/km^{2}). The 42,641 housing units had an average density of 590.3 per square mile (227.9/km^{2}).

The racial makeup of the city was 52.1% White, 30.8% Black or African American, 3.6% some other race, 2.8% Asian, 1.0% Native Hawaiian or Other Pacific Islander, and 0.6% Native American or Alaskan Native, with 9.1% from two or more races. Hispanics or Latinos of any race were 22.4% of the population.

Of the 38,057 households, 30.5% had children under 18 living with them, 27.4% had seniors 65 years or older living with them, 40.1% were married couples living together, 6.9% were couples cohabitating, 24.0% had a male householder with no partner present, and 29.0% had a female householder with no partner present. The median household size was 2.39 and the median family size was 2.98.

The age distribution was 22.9% under 18, 13.9% from 18 to 24, 27.0% from 25 to 44, 21.3% from 45 to 64, and 14.9% who were 65 or older. The median age was 34.4 years. For every 100 females, there were 114.6 males.

The median income for a household was $56,091, with family households having a median income of $71,975 and non-family households $35,403. The per capita income was $31,730. Out of the 90,842 people with a determined poverty status, 15.2% were below the poverty line. Further, 21.4% of minors and 16.3% of seniors were below the poverty line.

In the survey, residents self-identified with various ethnic ancestries. People of German descent made up 9.6% of the population of the town, followed by Irish at 6.5%, English at 6.3%, American at 5.1%, Italian at 2.7%, Swedish at 1.9%, Scotch-Irish at 1.1%, Dutch at 1.1%, Sub-Saharan African at 1.0%, Scottish at 0.9%, French at 0.9%, and Norwegian at 0.8%.

== Economy ==
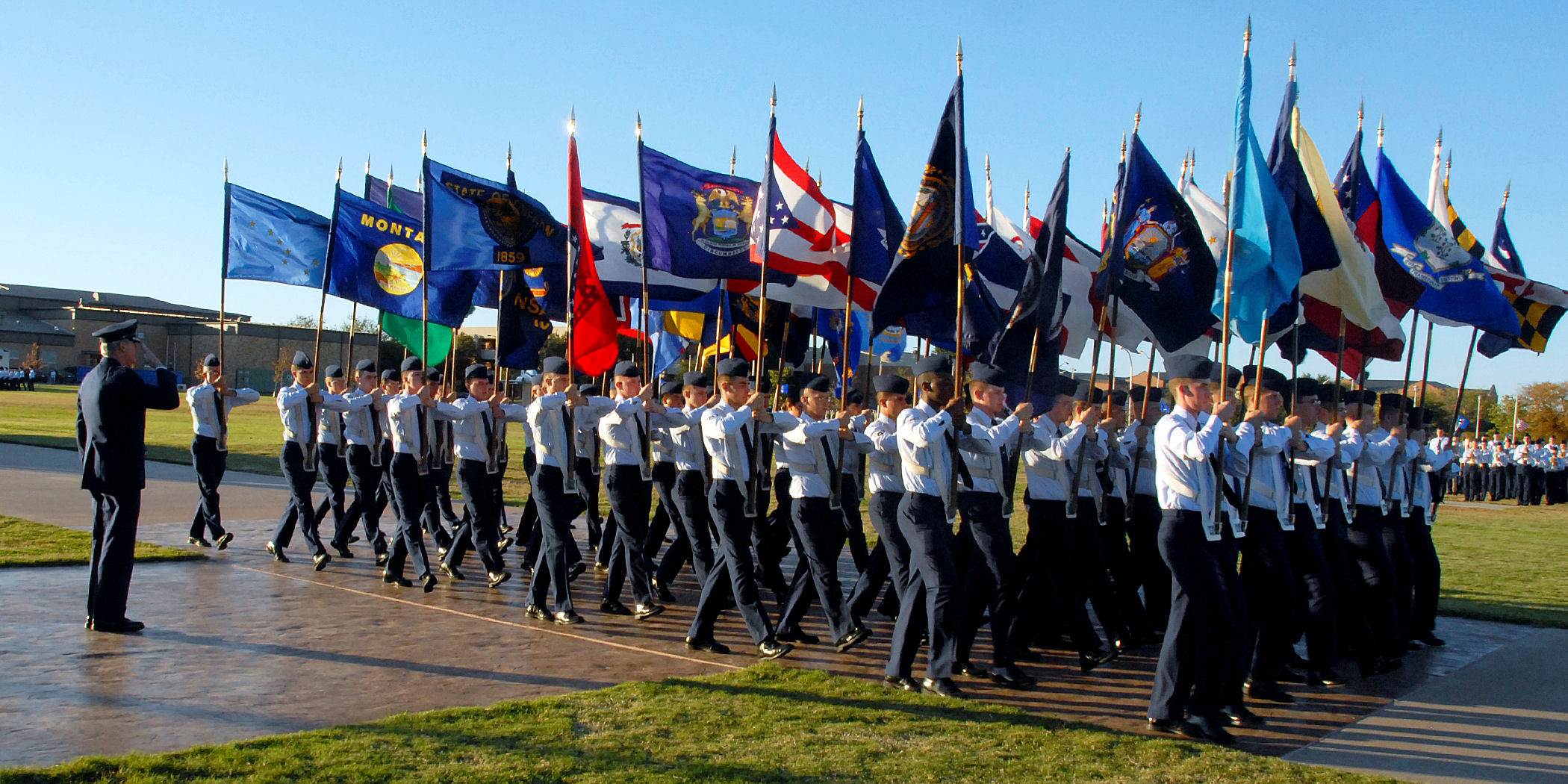
Memorial Day parade at Sheppard Air Force Base

=== Top employers ===
According to Wichita Falls Chamber of Commerce, the top employers in the city are:

#	Employer	# of Employees
1	Sheppard Air Force Base	7,222
2	Wichita Falls Independent School District	2,378
3	United Regional Health Care System	2,100
4	Midwestern State University	1,276
5	City of Wichita Falls	1,217
6	Arconic	1,072
7	Walmart (three locations)	1,009
8	North Texas State Hospital -Wichita Falls campus	1,000
9	Vitro	934
10	Texas Department of Criminal Justice James V. Allred Unit	921

== Media ==
Wichita Falls' media market also includes the nearby, smaller city of Lawton, Oklahoma. According to Nielsen Media Research estimates for the 2016–17 season, the market – which encompasses 10 counties in western North Texas and six counties in southwestern Oklahoma, has 152,950 households with at least one television set, making it the 148th-largest television market in the United States; the market also has an average of 120,200 radio listeners ages 12 and over, making it the 250th-largest radio market in the nation.

=== Newspapers ===
- Times Record News (daily)
- Falls News Journal (daily)

=== Television stations ===
- KFDX-TV (channel 3; NBC, and digital subchannel 3.3; The CW)
- KAUZ-TV (channel 6; CBS)
- KSWO-TV (channel 7; ABC, and digital subchannel 7.2; Telemundo)
- KJTL (channel 18; Fox)
- KJBO-LD (channel 35; MyNetworkTV)

KERA-TV out of Dallas–Fort Worth serves as the default PBS member station for Wichita Falls via a translator station on UHF channel 44.

=== Radio stations ===
- KWFS (1290 AM; news/talk radio)
- KMCU (88.7 FM; National Public Radio)
- KMOC (89.5 FM; Contemporary Christian)
- KZKL (90.5 FM; Contemporary Christian)
- KNIN (92.9 FM; CHR)
- KOLI (94.9 FM; Modern Country)
- KTWF (95.5 FM; Classic hits)
- KXXN (97.5 FM; Classic Country)
- KLUR (99.9 FM; Country)
- KWFB (100.9 FM; Adult hits)
- KWFS-FM (102.3 FM; Modern Country)
- KQXC (103.9 FM; Rhythmic CHR)
- KYYI (104.7 FM; Classic rock)
- KBZS (106.3 FM; Active rock)

== Sports and recreation ==
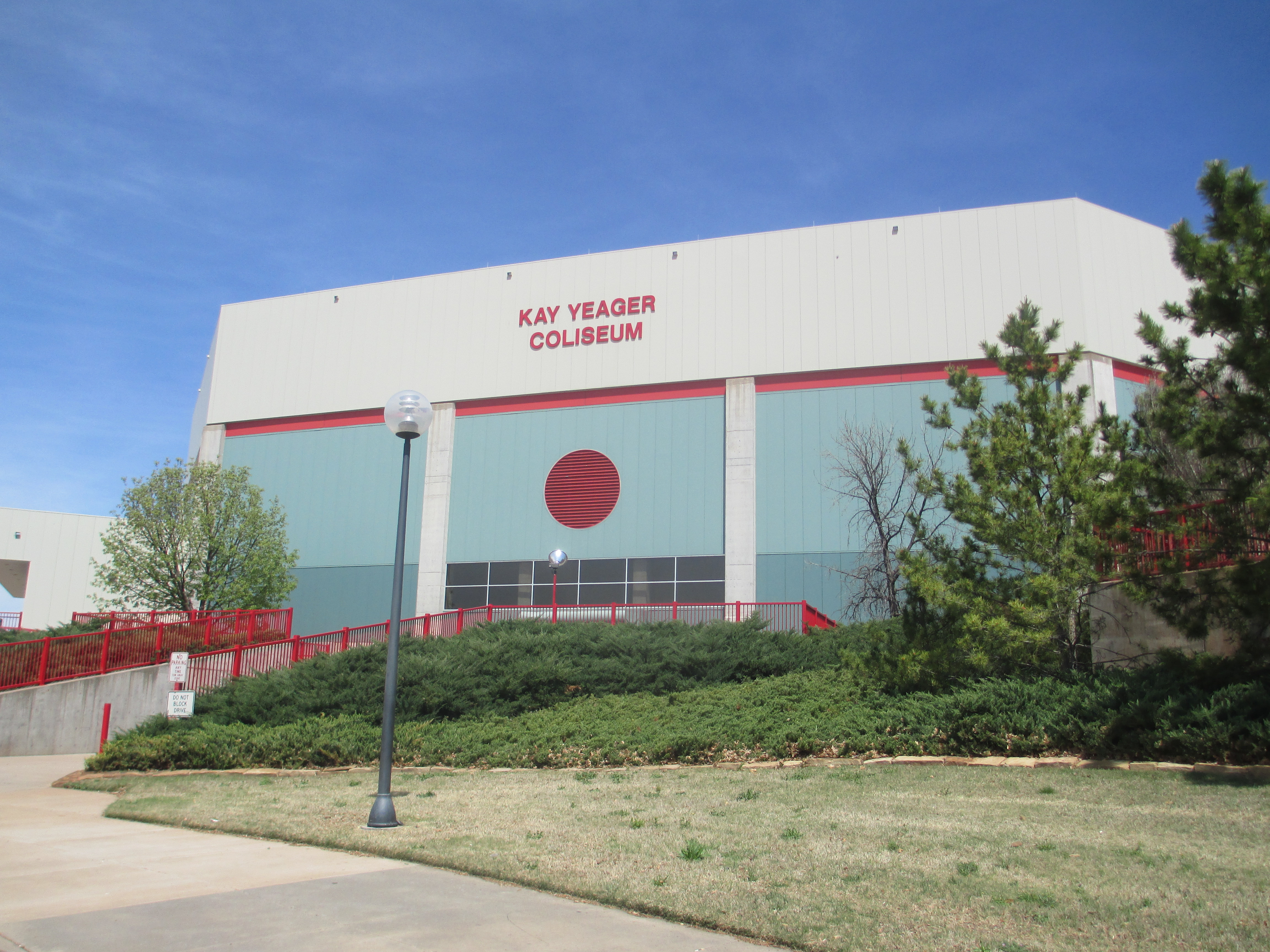
Kay Yeager Coliseum

=== Recreation ===
==== Lucy Park ====
Lucy Park is a 170-acre (69 ha) park with a log cabin, duck pond, swimming pool, playground, frisbee golf course, and picnic areas. It has multiple paved walkways suitable for walking, running, biking, or rollerskating, including a river walk that goes to a man-made waterfall feature in lieu of the original falls for which the city was named (the original falls, located in the river, were destroyed in a 19th-century flood; the new waterfall attraction, located in the park and discharging into the river, were built in response to numerous tourist requests to visit the "Wichita Falls"). It is one of 37 parks throughout the city. The parks range in size from small neighborhood facilities to the 258 acres of Weeks Park featuring the Champions Course at Weeks Park, an 18-hole golf course. In addition, an off-leash dog park is within Lake Wichita Park and a skatepark adjacent to the city's softball complex. Also, unpaved trails for off-road biking and hiking are available.

==== Circle Trail ====
The Wichita Falls Circle Trail system consists of over 24 miles of concrete trail that goes around the city. Almost all of the trails are 10-foot wide reinforced concrete. They can be used for walking, jogging, bicycling, and rollerblading. Started in 1987 and completed in 2025, the trail takes riders through several of the city parks and across a wide range of environments. It includes an off-shoot, the Wee-Chi-Tah Off Road Trail. This 13-mile loop has been voted the best in Texas.

==== Hotter'N Hell Hundred ====
Wichita Falls is the home of the annual Hotter'N Hell Hundred, the largest single-day century bicycle ride in the United States and one of the largest races in the world. The race started as a way for the city to celebrate its centennial in 1982. The race takes place over a weekend in August, and multiple events are hosted for people to participate.

=== Sports ===
The Wichita Falls Texans were a minor league basketball team in the Continental Basketball Association from 1988 to 1994. The team played its games at D.L. Ligon Coliseum, located on the campus of Midwestern State University. The Texans won the CBA championship in 1991.

In 2014, the Wichita Falls Nighthawks, an indoor football team, joined the Indoor Football League but suspended operations after the 2017 season.

The Professional Wrestling Hall of Fame relocated to Wichita Falls from Amsterdam, New York, in November 2015 and closed in 2022.

== Government ==
=== Local government ===
The mayor of Wichita Falls is Tim Short, who was elected on November 7, 2023. Mayors are elected on a nonpartisan ballot.

The Wichita Falls City Council has six members:

- District 1: Whitney Flack
- District 2: Robert Brooks
- District 3: Jeff Browning
- District 4: Mike Battaglino
- District 5: Tom Taylor
- At-large: Austin Cobb

The city manager is Jeff Jenkins.

List of mayors of Wichita Falls
Name	Term start	Term end
Otis T. Bacon	1889	1892
J.Q. Morrison	1892	1894
Charles O. Joline	1894	1898
Charles W. Bean	1900	1904
T.B. Noble	1904	1912
Jonathan M. Bell	1912	1914
J.W. Bradley	1914	1914
A.H. Britain	1914	1918
J.B. Marlow	1918	1920
Walter D. Cline	1920	1922
Frank Collier	1922	1925
R.E. Shepherd	1925	1928
Joseph William Akin	1928	1930
Walter Nelson, Jr.	1930	1934
John Thomas Young	1934	1936
William Edward Fitzgerald	1936	1942
W.P. (Bill) Hood	1942	1944
W.B. Hamilton	1944	1948
Harold Jones	1948	1952
Kindall Paulk	1952	1954
Lloyd Thomas	1954	1956
K.C. Spell	1956	1960
Kenneth Johnson	1960	1962
John Gavin	1962	1964
Winston Wallander	1964	1966
R.C. "Dick" Rancier	1966	1970
R. Kenneth Hill	1970	1974
Max Kruger	1974	1978
Kenneth Hill	1978	1984
Gary Cook	1982	1986
Charles Harper	1986	1988
Perry Goolsby	1988	1990
Michael Lam	1990	1996
Kay Yeager	1996	2000
Jerry Lueck	2000	2002
William Altman	2002	2005
Arthur B. Williams	2005	2005
Lanham Lyne	2005	2010
Glenn Barham	2010	2016
Stephen Santellana	2016	2023
Tim Short	2023	present

=== State and federal politics ===
Wichita Falls is located in the 69th district of the Texas House of Representatives. Lanham Lyne, a Republican, represented the district from 2011 to 2013; he was the mayor of Wichita Falls from 2005 to 2010. When Lyne declined to seek a second term in 2012, voters chose another Republican, James Frank. Wichita Falls is located in the 30th district of the Texas Senate. Craig Estes, a Republican, had held the senate seat since 2001, until Pat Fallon won election in 2018. Wichita Falls is part of Texas's 13th congressional district for the U.S. House of Representatives. Ronny Jackson, a Republican, has held this seat since 2021.

The Texas Department of Criminal Justice James V. Allred Unit is located in Wichita Falls, 4 mi (6.4 km) northwest of downtown. The prison is named for former Governor James V. Allred, a Democrat and a native of Bowie, Texas, who lived early in his career in Wichita Falls. The United States Postal Service operates the Wichita Falls Post Office, the Morningside Post Office, the Bridge Creek Post Office, and the Sheppard Air Force Base Post Office.

== Education ==
=== Primary and secondary schools ===
Public primary and secondary education is covered by the following school districts: Wichita Falls Independent School District, City View Independent School District, Burkburnett Independent School District, and Iowa Park Consolidated Independent School District. Several private and parochial schools operate in the city, as does an active home-school community. Many of the local elementary schools participate in the Head Start program for preschool-aged children.

Two schools in the Wichita Falls ISD participated in the International Baccalaureate programs. Hirschi High School offers the IB Diploma Programme, and G.H. Kirby Junior High School for the Middle Years Programme. Other public high schools were Wichita Falls High School and S. H. Rider High School (Wichita Falls ISD). All the high schools closed in 2024. The city opened 2 new high schools that year, Memorial High School and Legacy High School (both WFISD). The city also has City View High School (City View ISD).

By 1879, the first school was established. The first public school was a log structure established in the 1880s; in 1885, it was replaced with a former courthouse. Wichita Falls High School opened in 1890. That year, a school district was created, but problems with the law allowing its establishment meant it was dissolved in 1894 and the city provided schooling until the second establishment of a school district in 1900. In 1908, the Texas Legislature issued a charter for WFISD.

The city has a school for German children, Deutsche Schule Sheppard (DSS).

=== Higher education ===
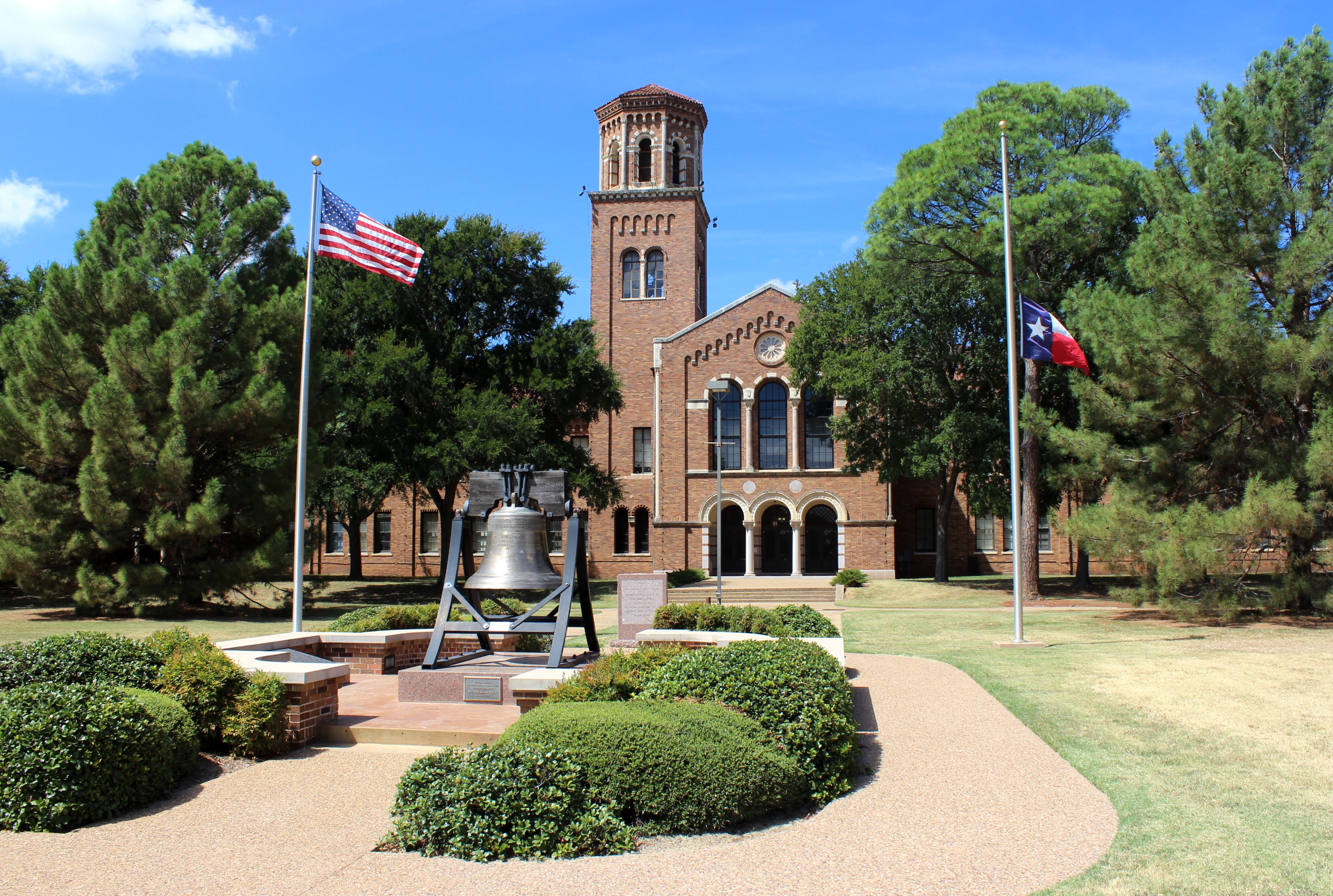
Hardin Administration Building at Midwestern State University

Wichita Falls is home to Midwestern State University, an accredited four-year college in the Texas Tech University System and the only independent liberal arts college in Texas offering both bachelor's and master's degrees.

Vernon College is the designated community college for all of Wichita County. A local branch nearby offers two-year degrees, certificate programs, and workforce development programs.

Wayland Baptist University, offering both bachelor's and master's degrees, has its main branch located in Plainview, Texas.

== Transportation ==
=== Highways ===
Wichita Falls is the western terminus for Interstate 44. U.S. Highways leading to or through Wichita Falls include 287, 277, 281, and 82. State Highway 240 ends at Wichita Falls and State Highway 79 runs through it. Wichita Falls has one of the largest freeway mileages for a city of its size as a result of a 1954 bond issue approved by city and county voters to purchase rights-of-way for several expressway routes through the city and county, the first of which was opened in the year 1958 as an alignment of U.S. 287 from Eighth Street at Broad and Holliday Streets northwestward across the Wichita River and bisecting Lucy and Scotland Parks to the Old Iowa Park Road, the original U.S. 287 alignment. That was followed by other expressway links including U.S. 82–287 east to Henrietta (completed in the year 1968), U.S. 281 south toward Jacksboro (completed 1969), U.S. 287 northwest to Iowa Park and Electra (opened 1962), Interstate 44 north to Burkburnett and the Red River (opened 1964), and Interstate 44 from Old Iowa Park Road to U.S. 287/Spur 325 interchange on the city's north side along with Spur 325 from I-44/U.S. 287 to the main gate of Sheppard Air Force Base (both completed as a single project in 1960). However, cross-country traffic for many years had to contend with several ground-level intersections and traffic lights over Holliday and Broad Streets near the downtown area for about 13 blocks between connecting expressway links until a new elevated freeway running overhead was completed in 2001.

Efforts to create an additional freeway along the path of Kell Boulevard for U.S. 82–277 began in 1967 with the acquisition of right-of-way that included a former railroad right-of-way and the first project including construction of the present frontage roads completed in 1977, followed by freeway lanes, overpasses, and on/off ramps in 1989 from just east of Brook Avenue west to Kemp Boulevard; similar projects west from Kemp to Barnett Road in 2001 followed by Barnett Road west past FM 369 in 2010 to tie in which a project now underway to transform U.S. 277 into a continuous four-lane expressway between Wichita Falls and Abilene.

=== Public transportation ===
The city operates a bus system, Falls Ride, which runs on an hourly schedule with seven routes (except on Sundays, when only one route is in operation).

Greyhound Lines provides intercity bus service to other locations served by Greyhound via its new terminal at the Wichita Falls Travel Center located at Fourth and Scott in downtown. Skylark Van Service shuttles passengers to and from Dallas-Fort Worth International Airport on several runs during the day all week long.

The Wichita Falls Municipal Airport is served by American Eagle, with two flights daily to the Dallas/Fort Worth International Airport. The Kickapoo Downtown Airport and the Wichita Valley Airport serve smaller, private planes.

Although still in the planning phase, local officials are currently working to potentially bring an Amtrak stop to the city. Wichita Falls last had passenger rail service in 1967.

== Landmarks ==
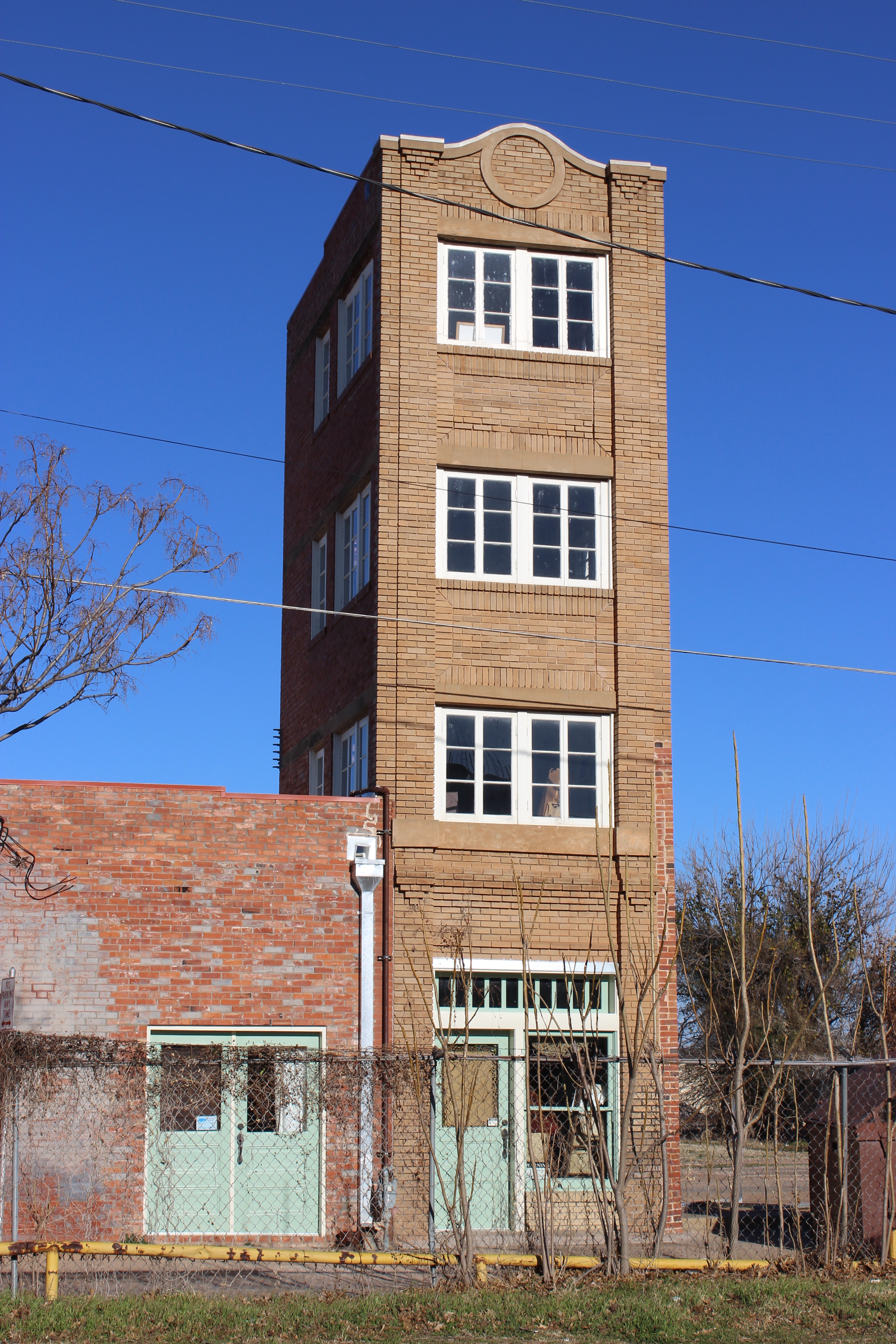
Newby-McMahon Building, completed in 1919, also known as the "Worlds Littlest Skyscraper"

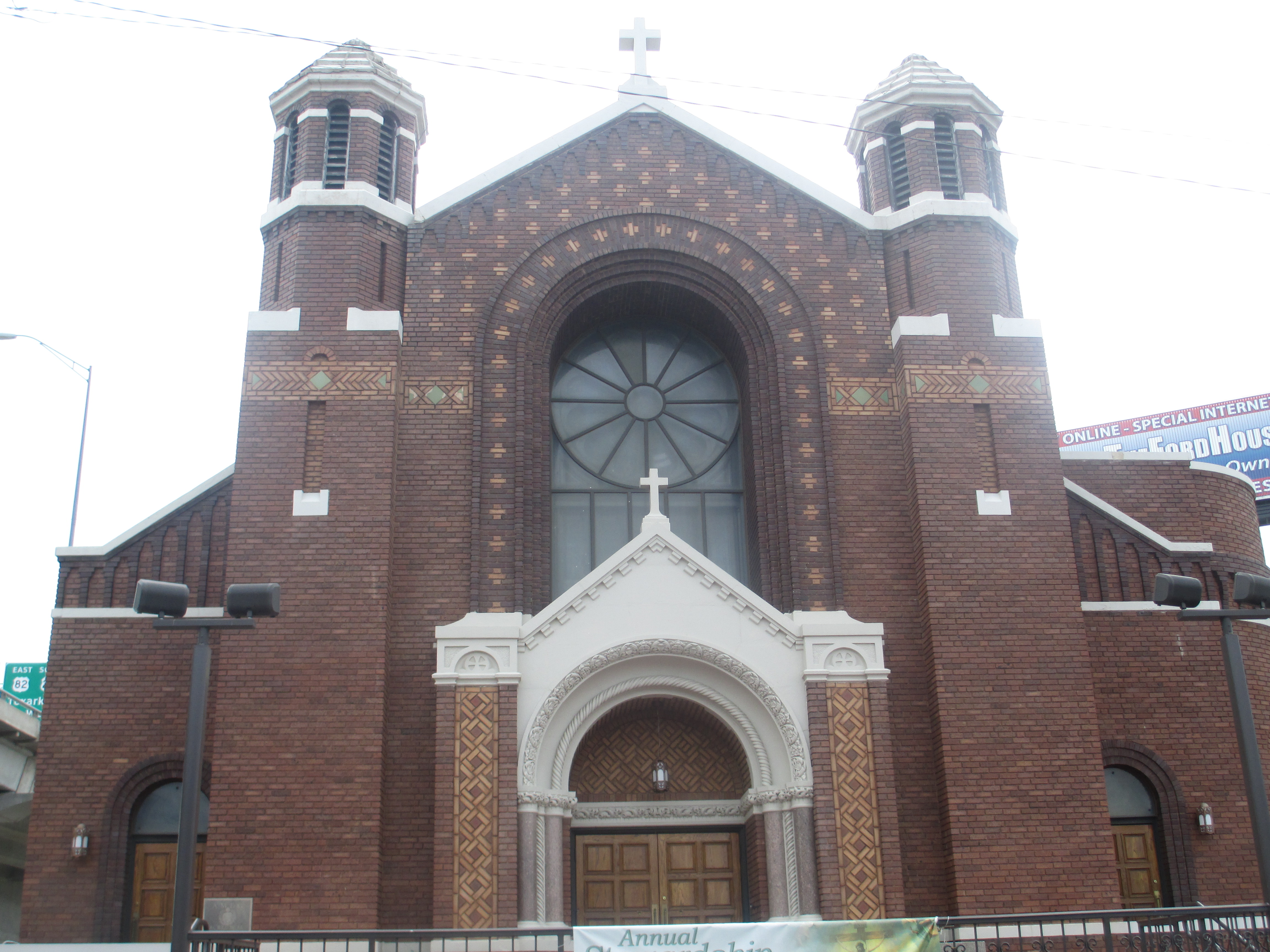
Sacred Heart Catholic Church

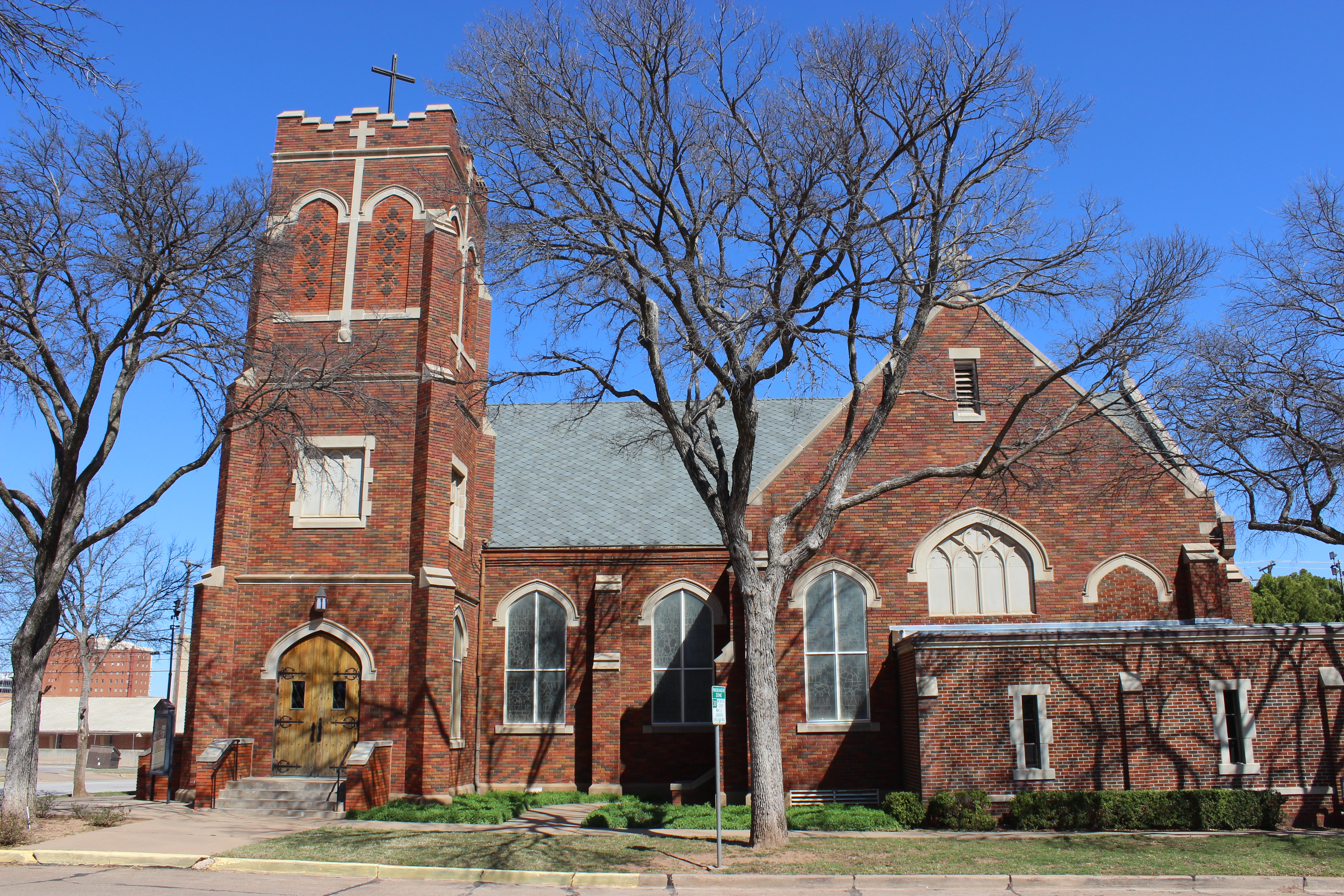
Episcopal Church of the Good Shepherd, 1915

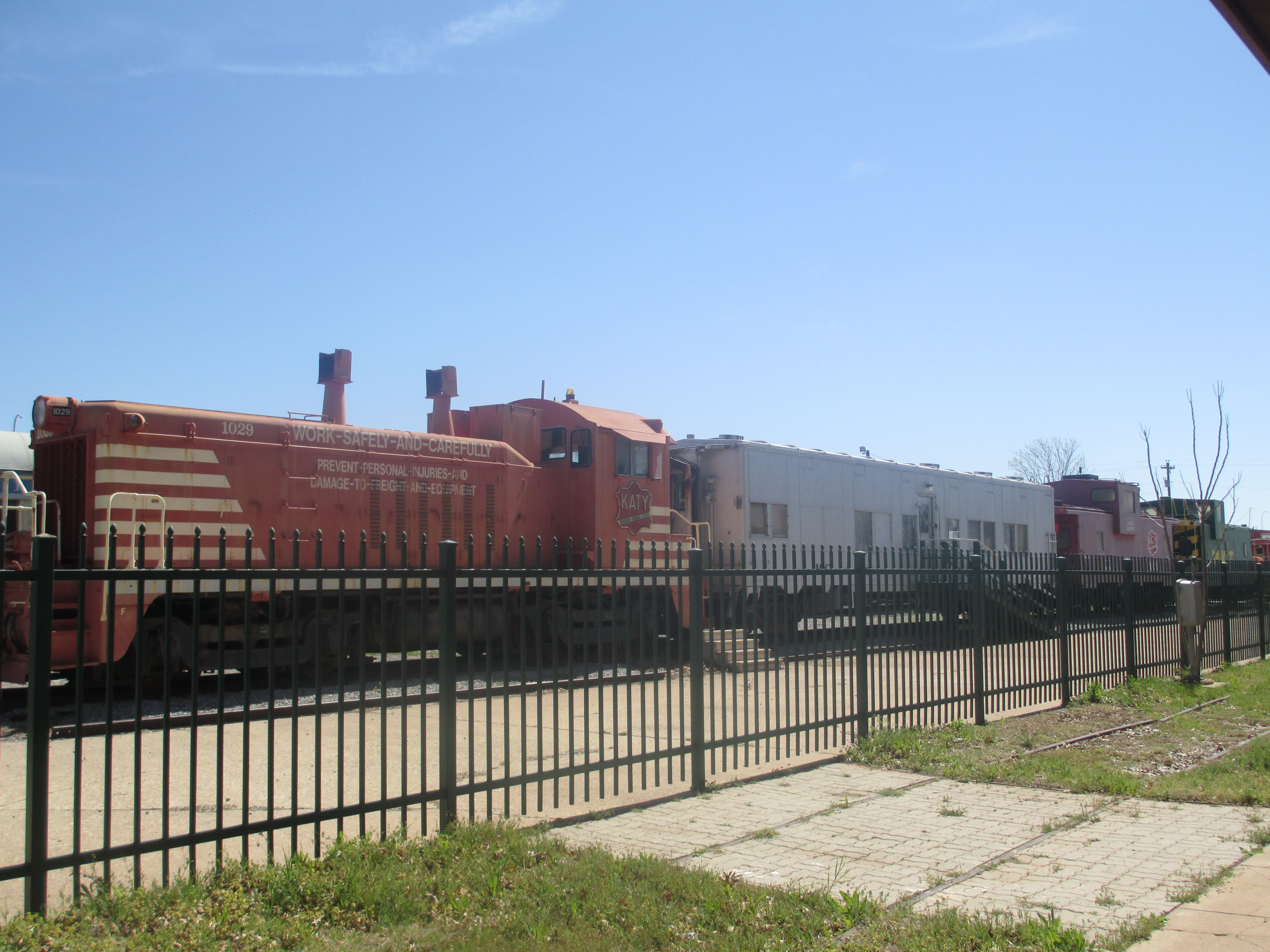
Railroad exhibit at Depot Square

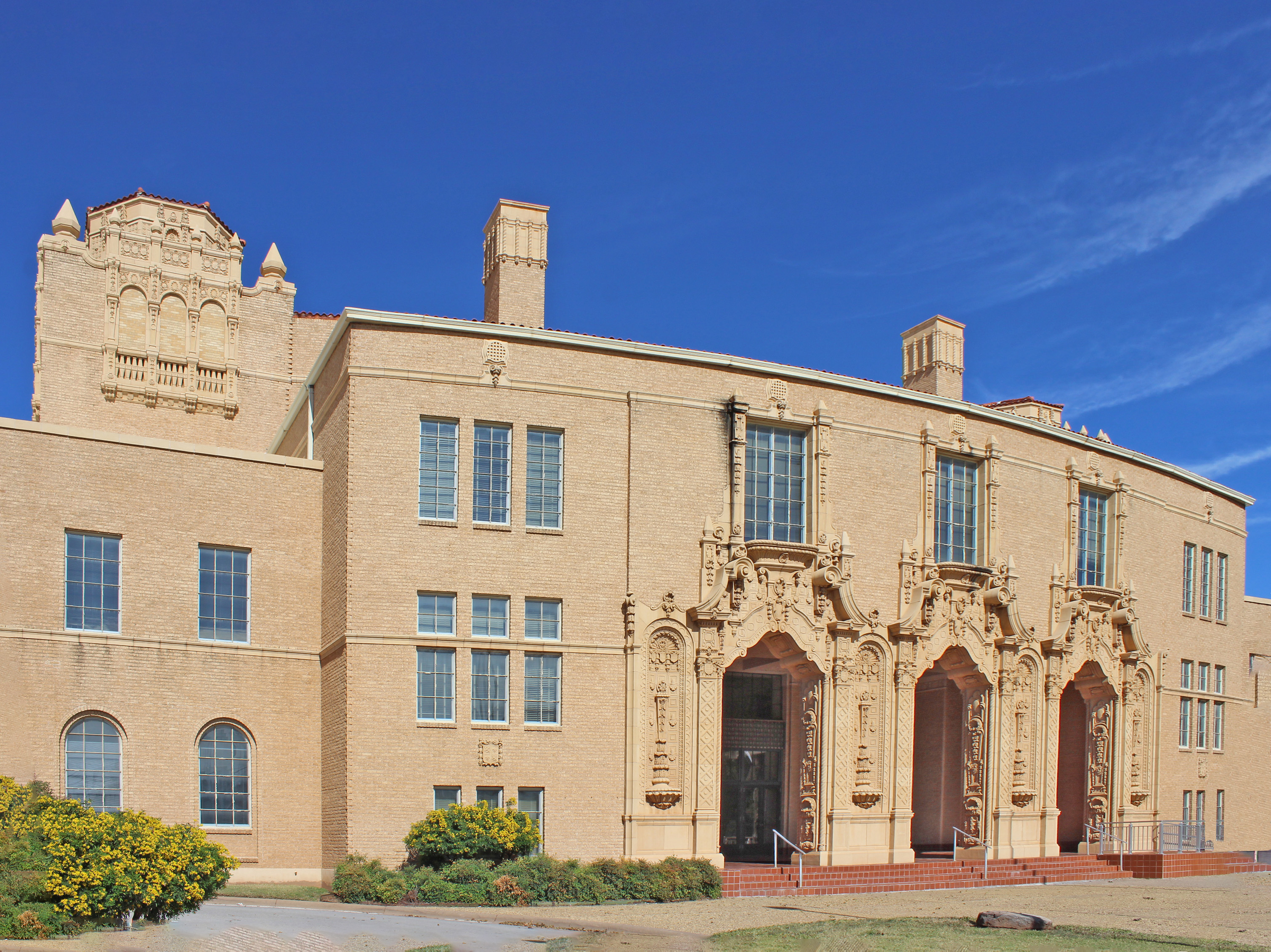
The Wichita Falls City Hall occupies the bottom floor of the Memorial Auditorium, 1927

== Notable people ==
- Greg Abbott, 48th Governor of Texas (born in Wichita Falls)
- Chase Anderson, professional baseball player (born in Wichita Falls)
- JT Barrett, quarterback for Ohio State University
- Renick Bell, musician, notable live coding pioneer
- Lindy Berry, MVP quarterback with the Edmonton Eskimos
- Leon Blue, pianist (born in Wichita Falls)
- Bowling For Soup, rock band
- Ryan Brasier, baseball player (born in Wichita Falls)
- John Bundy, magician
- Frank Kell Cahoon, Midland oilman and member of Texas House of Representatives
- Raymond Carroll, statistician now at Texas A&M University
- Greyson Chance, singer-songwriter and pianist born in Wichita Falls
- Don Cherry, pop singer and leading amateur golfer (born in Wichita Falls).
- Bert Clark, football coach, former head coach at Washington State University
- Phyllis Coates, film and television actress (born in Wichita Falls).
- William C. Conner (1920–2009), federal judge for United States District Court for the Southern District of New York.
- Hunter Dozier professional baseball player for the Kansas City Royals
- Nic Endo, singer for digital-hardcore band Atari Teenage Riot
- "Cowboy" Morgan Evans, rodeo champion
- Marcus Foster (born 1995), basketball player for PAOK Thessaloniki
- Thomas W. Fowler, World War II US Army officer and recipient of Medal of Honor
- Sally Gary, speaker and author
- Roberta Haynes, actress
- Eddie Hill, drag racer
- Frank N. Ikard, U.S. representative from Texas's 13th congressional district oil industry lobbyist
- Robert Jeffress, Baptist clergyman
- Matt and Bubba Kadane, members of the slowcore band Bedhead (band)
- Neel Kearby, World War II US Army Air Forces flying ace and Medal of Honor recipient
- Christian Leave, American singer-songwriter
- Keith Lee, professional Wrestler
- Khari Long, professional football player
- Rosie Manning, professional football player
- Markelle Martin, professional football player
- Phil McGraw, advice television show host
- Larry McMurtry, author who immortalized his home town by fictionalizing it
- Richard M. Mullane, astronaut and author
- Ed Neal, professional football player
- David Nelson, professional football player
- Shaunie O'Neal, American television personality
- Edward Opp, photojournalist
- Graham B. Purcell, Jr., Democrat, U.S. representative 1962–1973
- Jaret Reddick, songwriter and lead vocalist for Bowling for Soup
- Frances Reid, soap opera actress
- Mark Rippetoe, physical trainer and author, competitive powerlifter, gym owner
- Rosendo Rodriguez, Convicted double murderer and budding serial killer executed in 2018
- Herbert Rogers, classical pianist
- Lloyd Ruby, race car driver
- Bernard Scott, professional football player
- Frank Lee Sprague, composer and musician
- Keith Stegall, country music artist and record producer
- David Swinford, Texas state legislator
- Rex Tillerson, 69th United States Secretary of State, former ExxonMobil CEO
- John Tower, U.S. Senator from 1961 to 1984
- Tommy Tune, actor, dancer, choreographer and producer, 10-time Tony Award winner
- Nathan Vasher, professional football player
- Julian Elvis Ward Jr.
- John Edward Williams, author of the novel Stoner.
- Ronnie Williams, professional football player
- Dave Willis, voice actor, screenwriter, television producer

== See also ==
- List of museums in Wichita Falls, Texas
- Geology of Wichita Falls, Texas
