= Florence American Cemetery and Memorial =

War cemetery in Italy

Coordinates: 43°41′30″N 11°12′30″E

- American Battle Monuments Commission
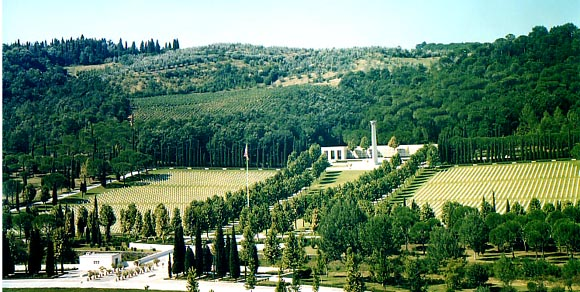
- Florence American Cemetery and Memorial, Tuscany, Italy
- For American fallen – liberation of Italy (1944)
- Established: 1944
- Location: near Florence, Italy
- Designed by: McKim, Mead & White, New York (MONUMENT); Gilmore David Clarke and Michael Rapuano, New York (LANDSCAPERS)
- Total burials: 4402
- Commemorated: 1409

Burials by nation
- United States of America

Burials by war
- World War II

The Florence American Cemetery and Memorial is about 7.5 miles (12 kilometers) south of Florence, Italy, about two miles (3 km) south of the Florence-Impruneta exit of the Rome-Milan autoroute. It covers about 70 acres (28 ha), chiefly on the west side of the Greve river, framed by wooded hills.

Most of those buried here are from the Fifth Army who died in the fighting that followed the capture of Rome in June 1944; others fell in the heavy fighting in the Apennines between then and 2 May 1945. It is run by the American Battle Monuments Commission.

== Notable burials and memorials ==
- Medal of Honor recipients
  - Addison Baker (1907–1943 †), United States Army Air Corps, for actions in World War II (cenotaph)
  - Roy W. Harmon (1915–1944 †), United States Army, for actions against German forces in Italy
  - George D. Keathley (1917–1944 †), United States Army, for actions against enemy forces in Italy
- War Correspondent
  - Ralph Barnes

== See also ==
- Florence War Cemetery – a Commonwealth War Graves Commission cemetery near Florence
- Jewish monumental cemetery, Florence
- Sant'Andrea in Percussina - nearby historic village
