= Megargel Independent School District =

Defunct school district in Texas, United States

Coordinates: 33.4519°N 98.9232°W

Megargel Independent School District was a school district located in Megargel, Texas (USA) from 1910 until 2006. The district had one school called the Megargel School. The district served portions of Archer County, including the town of Megargel. The district also served portions of Baylor County, Throckmorton County, and Young County.

== History ==
What became Megargel ISD was established in the spring and summer of 1910. The first school received an addition of two rooms circa 1914. In 1924 the school district acquired three school buses and an additional four rooms were added to the school in the wake of an oil boom in the area.

The school district had at its peak two schools: Megargel School, which served Pre-School through 6th Grade; and Megargel High School, which served 7th Grade to 12th Grade, and occupied a two-story structure. The high school building first opened in 1927. The high school had the first-ever school band established in the state.

The last Megargel school building opened in 1927. The campus, compared to other schools, was outdated by 2006. The gymnasium did not have air conditioning. The classrooms were heated with propane space heaters. The building contained coal chutes. The wood floors in the building were creaky.

In the 2000s, when the school was still open, it attracted troubled teenagers from nearby school districts because of its small class sizes.

== Closure ==
The April 11, 2006 issue of the Dallas Morning News featured the Megargel School in a front-page article. The school (along with the town) had declined for years, and was running out of funds.

After looking at what consolidation options were available with neighboring districts, the school board voted to consolidate with Olney Independent School District in Olney, Texas (about 12 miles (19 km) southeast), subject to voter approval on May 13, 2006. Proponents argued that the school (which had 63 students, including only one in the seventh grade) simply could not continue to function, and consolidation with the neighboring district (which has nearly 800 students) will provide more opportunities for educational achievement. Opponents feared that closure of the school would cause the town to disappear.

The vote (which required approval of the voters in both districts) was 89% in favor of consolidation. The school and district closed after the school year ended. Olney ISD announced plans to hire former Megargel ISD employees.

In 2009 Debbie Wells, a resident of Megargel and a former resident of Grapevine, Texas, bought the Megargel High school property. In 2014 she put it on sale for $289,000.
