= Megargel, Texas =

- Town
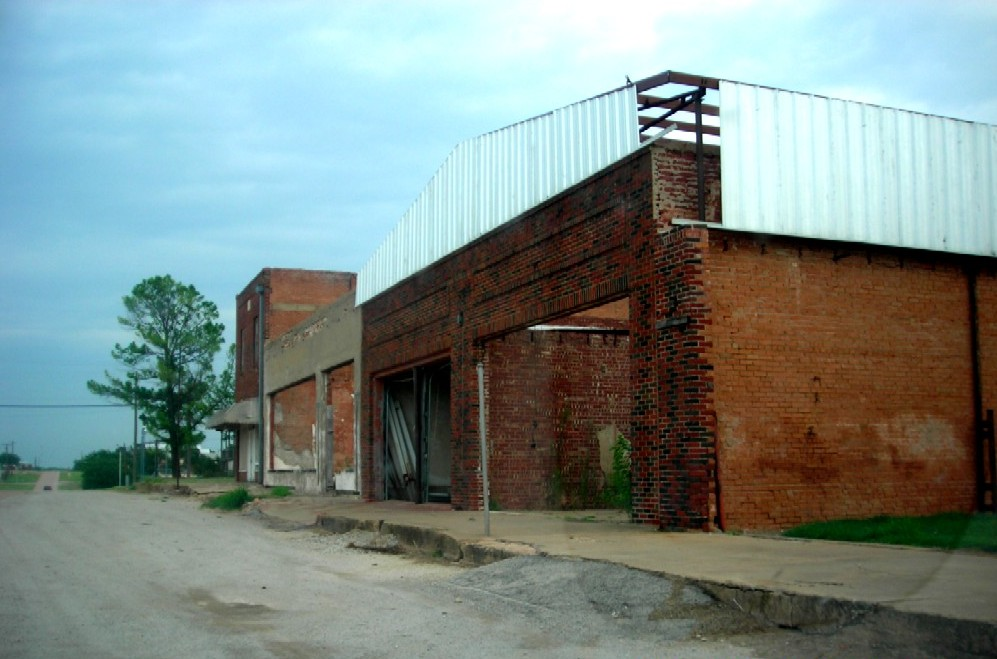
- A row of abandoned shops in Megargel, July 2009

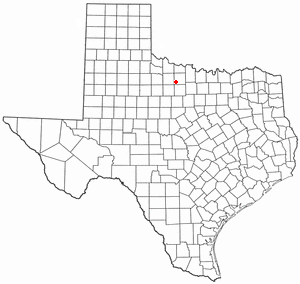
- Location of Megargel, Texas

- Coordinates: 33°27′13″N 98°55′47″W
- Country: United States
- State: Texas
- County: Archer

Area
  - Total: 0.62 sq mi (1.60 km^{2})
  - Land: 0.61 sq mi (1.58 km^{2})
  - Water: 0.0077 sq mi (0.02 km^{2})
- Elevation: 1,270 ft (390 m)

Population (2020)
  - Total: 174
  - Density: 285/sq mi (110/km^{2})
- Time zone: UTC-6 (Central (CST))
  - Summer (DST): UTC-5 (CDT)
- ZIP code: 76370
- Area code: 940
- FIPS code: 48-47460
- GNIS feature ID: 2412980

Megargel (/ˈmiːɡɑːrɡəl/ MEE-gar-gəl) is a town in Archer County, Texas, United States. It is part of the Wichita Falls, Texas metropolitan statistical area. Its population was 174 at the 2020 census. The town is named for Roy C. Megargel, the president of the railroad that developed the town.

== History ==
Megargel was established as a result of the Gulf, Texas and Western Railroad extending services to Jacksboro and Seymour. The town was established in 1910. The community developed multiple businesses within three months because the purchasers of land who established businesses 60 days after acquiring their lots received discounts as an incentive to do so.

The town had 350 residents in 1914. By 1923, the population had increased to 475. Around that time, H. Sheets drilled a new oil well in the Swastika oilfield, causing a population increase. Oil was discovered 4 miles (6.4 km) east of Megargel in 1925, and the town expanded even more. One year later, the town had 1,000 residents, and in 1927, it increased by 200 more people. About 1,200 people lived in Megargel in 1927, but the population began a decline after that point. The railroad stopped operations in 1943. The number of residents was 347 by 1950, 244 in 1990, 248 in 2000, and 203 in 2010.

In 2014, 130 water meters out of the 200 in Megargel were active, and many houses were unoccupied. That year, Bill Hanna of the Fort Worth Star-Telegram stated that downtown Megargel was "virtually empty, littered with crumbling and abandoned buildings and outdated gas stations." Hanna stated that some Megargel residents believed that the demise of the Megargel Independent School District was a factor in recent population declines.

== Geography ==
According to the United States Census Bureau, the town has a total area around 400 acres (160 ha), all land.

The town is 110 mi (180 km) northwest of Fort Worth.

== Demographics ==
Historical population
Census	Pop.	Note	%±
1930	813		—
1940	531		−34.7%
1950	347		−34.7%
1960	417		20.2%
1970	373		−10.6%
1980	381		2.1%
1990	244		−36.0%
2000	248		1.6%
2010	203		−18.1%
2020	174		−14.3%
U.S. Decennial Census; 2020 Census

As of the census of 2000, 248 people, 104 households, and 66 families were residing in the town. The population density was 404.4 people/sq mi (157.0/km^{2}). The 132 housing units averaged 215.3/sq mi (83.6/km^{2}). The racial makeup of the town was 93.55% White, 0.81% African American, 0.40% Native American, 1.21% Asian, and 4.03% from two or more races. Hispanics or Latinos of any race were 6.05% of the population.

Of the 104 households, 29.8% had children under the age of 18 living with them, 51.0% were married couples living together, 7.7% had a female householder with no husband present, and 35.6% were not families. About 31.7% of all households were made up of individuals, and 8.7% had someone living alone who was 65 or older. The average household size was 2.38, and the average family size was 2.97.

In the town, the age distribution was 24.2% under 18, 5.6% from 18 to 24, 29.0% from 25 to 44, 26.6% from 45 to 64, and 14.5% who were 65 or older. The median age was 41 years. For every 100 females, there were 100.0 males. For every 100 females age 18 and over, there were 116.1 males.

The median income for a household in the town was $30,000, and for a family was $36,250. Males had a median income of $26,429 versus $23,750 for females. The per capita income for the town was $14,783. About 4.2% of families and 4.3% of the population were below the poverty line, including 1.8% of those under 18 and none of those 65 or over.

== Education ==
Megargel is served by the Olney Independent School District.

Megargel was once served by the Megargel Independent School District. By 2006, the school (along with the town) had been declining for years, and was running out of funds. The school board has voted to consolidate with Olney ISD, the neighboring school district in Olney, Texas (about 12 miles southeast), subject to voter approval on May 13, 2006. Proponents argued that the school (which had only 63 students, including only one in seventh grade) simply cannot continue to function, and consolidation with the neighboring district (which had nearly 800 students) would provide more opportunities for educational achievement. Opponents feared that closure of the school would cause the town to disappear. The vote was in favor of consolidation. The school and district closed after the school year ended.

The designated community college for Archer County is Vernon Regional Junior College.

== Government and infrastructure ==
The community post office had opened within three months of Megargel's establishment. The United States Postal Service continues to operate the Megargel Post Office.

== Economy ==
Megargel had a hotel, a bank, and 23 stores within three months of its founding. By 1986, Megargel had nine businesses.

== Media ==
The community previously had a newspaper, Megargel Times, established by 1914.

== See also ==
- List of municipalities in Texas
