= Florence War Cemetery =

British cemetery in Tuscany, Italy

- Commonwealth War Graves Commission
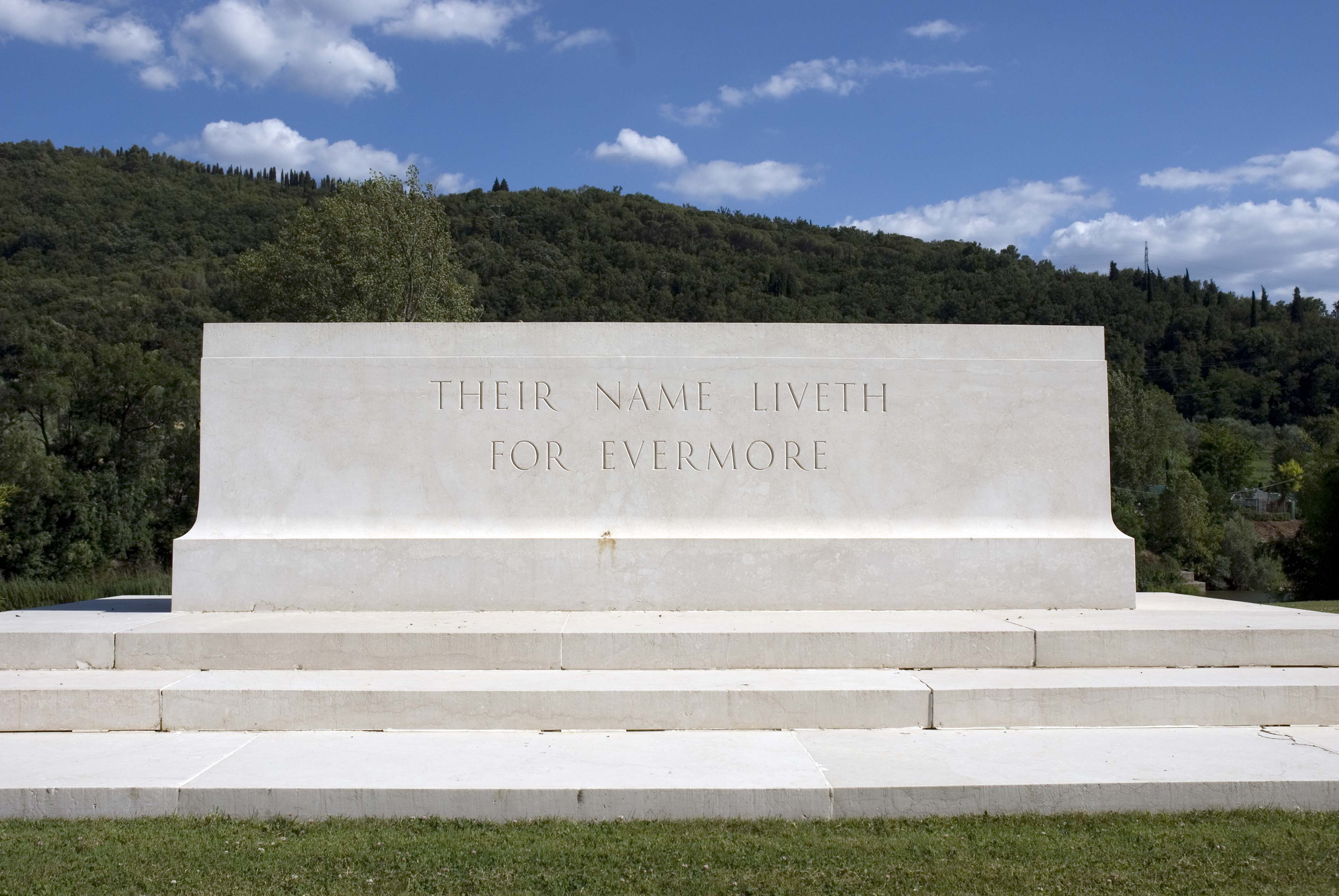
- Used for those deceased 1944
- Established: 1944
- Location: 43°46′10″N 11°20′36″E near Fiesole, Tuscany, Italy
- Designed by: Louis de Soissons
- Total burials: 1,632
- Unknowns: 120

Burials by nation
- Allied Powers

Burials by war
- World War II: 1,632

Florence War Cemetery is a Commonwealth War Graves Commission burial ground for the dead of World War II located in Italy near Florence in the locality Girone-Compiobbi (municipality of Fiesole), close to the Arno river.

== History ==
In November 1944, the site was selected and was originally intended for the soldiers who had died in the hospitals in and around Florence. The majority of the graves are occupied by soldiers who lost their lives fighting in the Florence area, after it was captured by allied forces in August 1944. The town was in the middle of the Arno Line, defensive positions formed by the retreating German forces, and the bodies of the soldiers killed during fighting from July to September 1944 are buried here. 83 graves from the nearby Arrow Route Cemetery were moved here after the war.

== See also ==
- Florence American Cemetery and Memorial
- Jewish monumental cemetery, Florence
