= Ralph Barnes (journalist) =

American journalist (1899–1940)

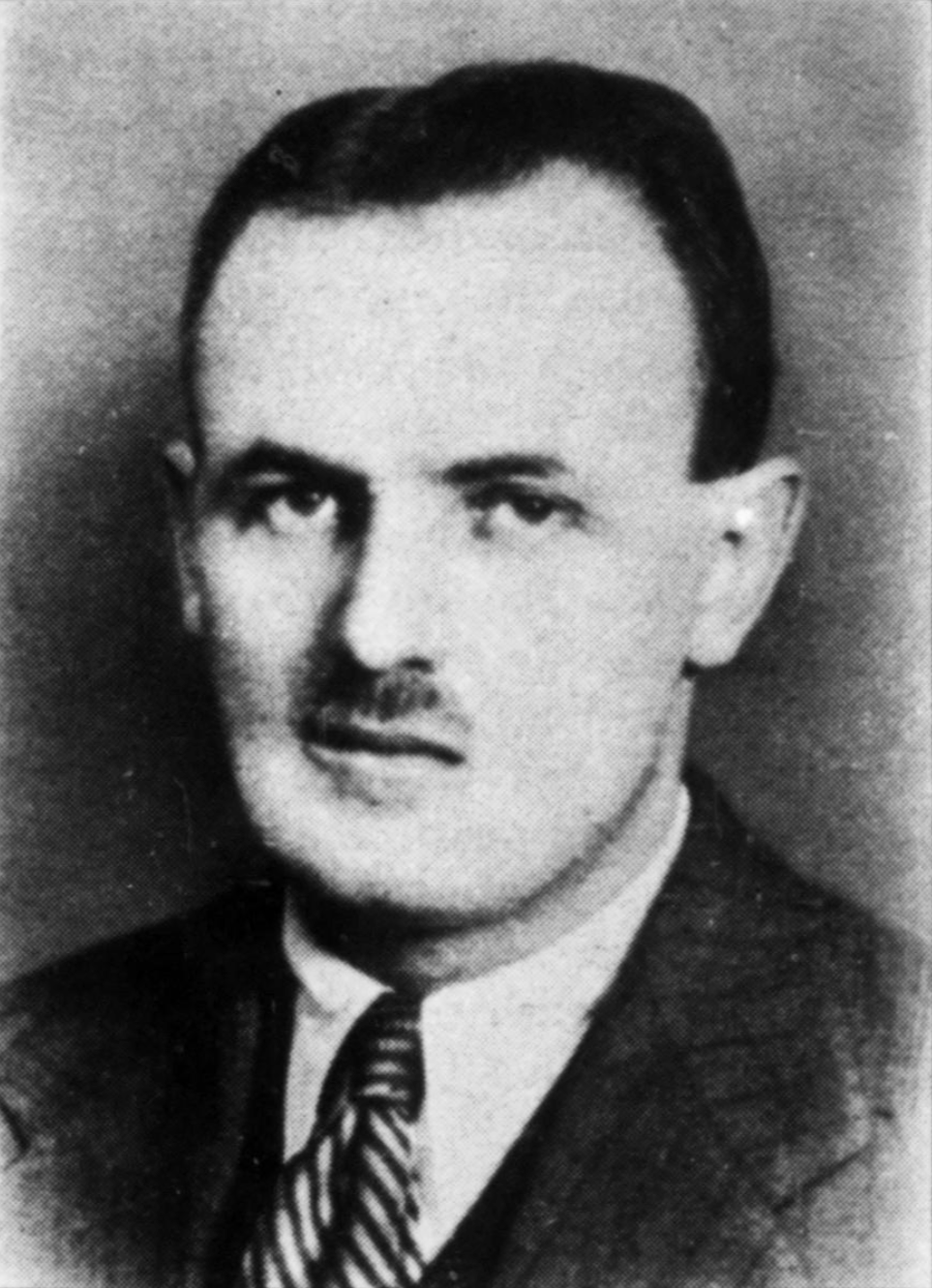
- Born: Ralph Waldo Barnes; June 14, 1899; Salem, Oregon, U.S.
- Died: November 17, 1940 (aged 41); Danilovgrad, Montenegro
- Burial place: Florence American Cemetery
- Education: Salem High School
- Alma mater: Willamette University; Harvard University
- Occupations: Journalist, foreign correspondent
- Employer: New York Herald Tribune
- Spouse: Esther Barton Parounagian (m. 1924)

Ralph Waldo Barnes (June 14, 1899 – November 17, 1940) was an American journalist from Oregon, best known as a foreign correspondent in Europe during the 1930s.

== Early life and education ==
Barnes was born in Salem, Oregon, on June 14, 1899 to Edward Talbot Barnes and Mabel Nancy Baker Barnes. He graduated from Salem High School in 1917, and that summer he began attending St. John's Military Academy in Delafield, Wisconsin. In the fall of 1918 he enrolled at Willamette University in Salem, but he had to interrupt his studies when his military reserve unit was called to Camp MacArthur in Waco, Texas for training. Barnes returned to Salem and received his bachelor's degree in history from Willamette in 1922. After earning his master's degree in economics from Harvard University, he returned to Salem and married his longtime sweetheart, Esther Barton Parounagian. Esther was born in Pittsfield, Vermont on December 12, 1901, and married Mr. Barnes on October 11, 1924. She too was a Willamette graduate, though of 1923.

== Career ==
In 1924, Barnes was hired by the New York Herald Tribune. His first foreign correspondent assignment was in Paris. While assigned to Paris, in 1926, he interviewed Gertrude Ederle upon the completion of her historic swim across the English Channel, and in 1927, he interviewed Charles Lindbergh after he completed the first solo transatlantic flight. In 1930, the Herald sent Barnes to Rome, where he reported on the fascist regime of Benito Mussolini. In 1931, he became the paper's Moscow correspondent. He became known for reporting stories the Soviet regime did not want publicized, unlike Walter Duranty of The New York Times, who was sympathetic to the Soviet government. In 1935, Barnes transferred to Berlin, where he reported on the Nazi regime despite its censorship. After the German invasion of Poland, and the German invasion of France and the Low Countries, Barnes concluded that Germany would next attack the Soviet Union, despite the 1939 Molotov–Ribbentrop Pact. The Nazi government expelled Barnes from Germany after the Tribune published the story.

== Death and legacy ==
On November 17, 1940, on his way to cover Mussolini's invasion of Greece, Barnes was killed along with five Royal Air Force crew members when his plane crashed in Yugoslavia. Upon his death, reporters Leland Stowe of the Herald Tribune, William L. Shirer of Columbia Broadcasting, and William H. Stoneman of the Chicago Daily News saluted Barnes and his achievements. Barnes was the first war correspondent killed during World War II. In 1943, a Liberty ship was christened the SS Ralph Barnes in his honor. Barnes was buried in the Florence American Cemetery in Italy.
