= Tom Vaughn (American football) =

American football player (1943–2020)

Tommy Vaughn
No. 48
- Position: Safety

Personal information
- Born: February 28, 1943; Troy, Ohio, U.S.
- Died: July 5, 2020 (aged 77)
- Listed height: 5 ft 11 in (1.80 m)
- Listed weight: 190 lb (86 kg)

Career information
- High school: Troy (OH)
- College: Iowa State
- NFL draft: 1965: 5th round, 57th overall pick
- AFL draft: 1965: 11th round, 81st overall pick

Career history
- Detroit Lions (1965–1971)

Awards and highlights
- First-team All-American (1963); 2× First-team All-Big Eight (1963, 1964); Second-team All-Big Eight (1962)

Career NFL statistics
- Interceptions: 9
- Fumble recoveries: 9
- Stats at Pro Football Reference

Thomas Robert Vaughn (February 28, 1943 – July 5, 2020) was an American professional football player and coach. He played college football at Iowa State and as a safety in the National Football League (NFL) for the Detroit Lions from 1965 to 1971.

Vaughn was born in 1943 at Troy, Ohio. He attended Troy High School where he was a high school All-American.

At Iowa State, he played as a fullback on offense and as a safety on defense. He tallied 1,889 rushing yards for Iowa State between 1962 and 1964. He also led the Big Eight Conference in punt returns in 1963 and 1964. As a senior, he was selected by both the Associated Press and UPI as a first-team defensive back on the 1964 All-Big Eight Conference football team.

He was drafted by the Detroit Lions in the fifth round of the 1965 NFL draft. Between 1965 and 1971, he appeared in 88 games with the Lions, 61 as a starter, tallying nine interceptions and nine fumble recoveries. He also returned 62 kickoffs for 1,595 yards (25.7-yard average) and 33 punts for 298 yards (9.0-yard average).

After missing much of the 1971 season due to a head injury, Vaughn announced his retirement in June 1972. He said at the time that he had been knocked out 20 times and was tired of it.

After retiring as a player, he held assistant coaching positions with the Detroit Wheels (1974), Iowa State (1975), Missouri, Wyoming, and Arizona State.

Vaughn died in 2020, at age 77. He is one of at least 345 NFL players to be diagnosed after death with chronic traumatic encephalopathy (CTE), which is caused by repeated hits to the head.
