= Olney High School (Texas) =

Location
- 704 West Grove Street; Olney, Texas 76374-1362; United States; 33.366192°N 98.761501°W

Information
- School type: Public high school
- School district: Olney Independent School District
- Principal: Matt Caffey
- Staff: 25.38 (FTE)
- Grades: 9-12
- Enrollment: 215 (2023-2024)
- Student to teacher ratio: 8.47
- Colors: Red, White & Black
- Athletics conference: UIL Class AA
- Mascot: Cub
- Rivals: Hawley Bearcats; Abilene TLCA Eagles; Anson Tigers; Stamford Bulldogs; Cisco Loboes
- Newspaper: Cub Hub
- Yearbook: The Cub
- Website: Olney High School

Olney High School is a public high school located in Olney, Texas (USA) and classified as a 2A school by the UIL. It is part of the Olney Independent School District located in northwest Young County. In 2015, the school was rated "Met Standard" by the Texas Education Agency.

== Athletics ==
The Olney Cubs compete in these sports -

- Baseball
- Basketball
- Cross Country
- Football
- Golf
- Powerlifting
- Softball
- Track and Field

=== State Titles ===
- Boys Golf
  - 1992(2A), 2000(2A), 2001(2A)
- Girls Golf
  - 1973(B)

== Band ==
- Marching Band State Champions
  - 1988(2A)

== Theater ==
- One Act Play
  - 1969(2A)

== Alumni ==
- Whitaker, Scott, Marquis Publications Who's Who in America
- Riley Greer, J.P. Morgan Executive
- James Vick, professional Mixed Martial Artist, current UFC Lightweight Contender
