= Jim Grisham =

American football player (1942–2012)

No. 45
- Position: Fullback

Personal information
- Born: December 4, 1942; Houston, Texas, U.S.
- Died: July 30, 2012 (aged 69)
- Listed height: 6 ft 2 in (1.88 m)
- Listed weight: 210 lb (95 kg)

Career information
- High school: Olney (TX)
- College: Oklahoma
- NFL draft: 1965: 6th round, 79th overall pick
- AFL draft: 1965: 17th round, 130th overall pick

Career history
- Minnesota Vikings (1965)*
- * Offseason or practice squad member only

Awards and highlights
- Consensus All-American (1963); All-American (1964); 3× First-team All-Big Eight (1962, 1963, 1964)

Jim Grisham (December 4, 1942 – July 30, 2012) was an American football fullback and linebacker, who played at the University of Oklahoma from 1961 to 1964.

== Early life ==
Grisham attended Olney High School, where he played quarterback, End, halfback and fullback. As a junior in 1959, he played halfback, helping the team reach the Texas Class 2A semifinal.

As a senior in 1960, he was named the starter at fullback after Harold Phillip graduated. He led his team to a second straight semifinal appearance, while scoring 21 touchdowns and earning All-state honors.

== College career ==
Grisham accepted a football scholarship from the University of Oklahoma, to play under head coach Bud Wilkinson. As a sophomore, he posted 147 carries for 711 yards (4.8-yard average) and 8 touchdowns.

As a junior in 1963, he was named a consensus All-American, playing both offense (fullback) and defense (linebacker). He tallied 153 carries for 861 yards (5.6-yard average) and 8 touchdowns. He rushed for 218 yards and scored 4 touchdowns against Oklahoma State University in the Bedlam Series. He finished second in the Big Eight Conference in rushing behind Gale Sayers.

As a senior, Gomer Jones became the new football head coach of the Sooners. Grisham registered 146 carries for 725 yards (5.0-yard average) and 3 touchdowns, finishing second in the Big Eight Conference in rushing behind Walt Garrison. He was one of four Sooners stars who missed the 1965 Gator Bowl game against Florida State University. Grisham, offensive lineman Ralph Neely, halfback Lance Rentzel and end Wes Skidgel signed with professional teams before the game, and were ruled ineligible for the contest, which Florida State University won 36–19 on the strength of four touchdown catches by Fred Biletnikoff.

Grisham rushed for a school record 2,297 career yards, including a 5.2 yards per carry average and 19 touchdowns in his college career.

== Professional career ==
Grisham was selected by the Minnesota Vikings during the sixth round in 1965 NFL draft. He was also selected by the Houston Oilers in the 17th round of the 1965 AFL draft. He opted to sign with the Vikings and was waived on August 2.
