= Butch Allison =

American football player (1944–2010)

Profile
- Position: Guard

Personal information
- Born: October 29, 1944; Fort Worth, Texas, U.S.
- Died: April 2, 2010 (aged 65); St. Louis, Missouri, U.S.
- Listed height: 6 ft 3 in (1.91 m)
- Listed weight: 245 lb (111 kg)

Career information
- High school: Parkview HS
- College: Missouri
- NFL draft: 1966: 2nd round, 31st overall pick
- AFL draft: 1966: 7th round, 57th overall pick

Career history
- 1966: Baltimore Colts
- 1967: New Orleans Saints
- 1967: Edmonton Eskimos

Awards and highlights
- Second-team All-American (1964); First-team All-Big Eight (1964); Second-team All-Big Eight (1965)

Buford Needham "Butch" Allison (October 29, 1944 – April 2, 2010) was an American professional football player who was an offensive lineman for the Baltimore Colts and New Orleans Saints of the National Football League (NFL) and the Edmonton Eskimos of the Canadian Football League (CFL). He played college football for the Missouri Tigers. Allison was selected in both the seventh round of the 1966 AFL draft by the Oakland Raiders and the second round of the 1966 NFL draft by the Baltimore Colts, who he played the 1966 NFL season with. He played for both the New Orleans Saints and Edmonton Eskimos in 1967.

== Early career ==
Allison played high school football at Parkview High School as a right tackle. As a senior in 1961, he was selected to the All-Ozark county team and designated as an All-American.

Allison signed to play for the Missouri Tigers in college, and he went on to be named on the All-Big Eight conference team three years in a row. In his junior year, Allison was also named a second-team All-American. He received an honorable mention for the All-America team in 1965. The Tigers won the 1966 Sugar Bowl against the Florida Gators during Allison's senior year.

== Professional career ==
Allison was drafted in both the National Football League and the American Football League in 1966. The Baltimore Colts of the National Football League selected Allison in the second round of the 1966 NFL draft with the 31st overall pick. The Oakland Raiders of the American Football League also selected Allison in the seventh round of the 1966 AFL draft with the 57th overall pick. Allison signed with the Colts and played for the team through the preseason. He was released by the Colts in September 1966, remaining with the team as a practice squad player.

Before the 1967 season, the Colts traded Allison to the New Orleans Saints as part of a deal that also sent quarterback Gary Cuozzo to the Saints in exchange for a 1967 first round pick (#1-Bubba Smith), a 1967 third round pick (#54-Norman Davis), a 1969 seventh round pick (#163-Gary Fleming) and center Bill Curry.

He played one regular season game for the Edmonton Eskimos of the Canadian Football League in 1967.

== Personal life ==
Allison was the brother of Wilson Allison, another former professional football player. Wilson Allison played college football at Baylor University and was drafted by the Baltimore Colts in the 1961 NFL draft. He later signed with the San Diego Chargers of the American Football League.

Later in life, Butch Allison made a career in sports printing. Along with his second wife, Mary Ann (née Azar), he also managed the West End Galleries and the Clarksville Antique Mall.

== Death ==
Allison died on April 2, 2010, in St. Louis, Missouri.
