= 1964 All-Big Eight Conference football team =

American football team

The 1964 All-Big Eight Conference football team consists of American football players chosen by various organizations for All-Big Eight Conference teams for the 1964 NCAA University Division football season. The selectors for the 1964 season included the Associated Press (AP) and the United Press International (UPI). Players selected as first-team players by both the AP and UPI are designated in bold.

== Offensive selections ==
=== Backs ===
- **Gary Lane**, Missouri (AP-1, UPI-1)
- **Gale Sayers**, Kansas (AP-1, UPI-1) (College and Pro Football Halls of Fame)
- **Kent McCloughan**, Nebraska (AP-1, UPI-1)
- **Jim Grisham**, Oklahoma (AP-1, UPI-1)
- Bob Churchich, Nebraska (AP-2)
- Bob Hohn, Nebraska (AP-2)
- Lance Rentzel, Oklahoma (AP-2)
- Walt Garrison, Oklahoma State (AP-2)

=== Ends ===
- **Tony Jeter**, Nebraska (AP-1, UPI-1)
- **Freeman White**, Nebraska (AP-1, UPI-1)
- Sam Harris, Colorado (AP-2)
- Jim Waller, Missouri (AP-2)

=== Tackles ===
- **Larry Kramer**, Nebraska (AP-1, UPI-1)
- **Ralph Neely**, Oklahoma (AP-1, UPI-1)
- Stan Irvine, Colorado (AP-2)
- Butch Metcalf, Oklahoma (AP-2)

=== Guards ===
- **Newt Burton**, Oklahoma (AP-1, UPI-1)
- Tom Wyrostek, Missouri (AP-1)
- Bob Brown, Missouri (UPI-1)
- Carl Schreiner, Oklahoma (AP-2)
- Rod Cutsinger, Oklahoma State (AP-2)

=== Centers ===
- **Larry Sittler**, Nebraska (AP-1, UPI-1)
- John Garrett, Oklahoma (AP-2)

== Defensive selections ==
=== Defensive ends ===
- **Jack Jacobson**, Oklahoma State (AP-1, UPI-1)
- **Bill Matan**, Kansas State (AP-1, UPI-1)
- Rick McCurdy, Oklahoma (AP-2)
- Langston Coleman, Nebraska (AP-2)

=== Defensive tackles ===
- **John Van Sicklen**, Iowa State (AP-1, UPI-1)
- Butch Allison, Missouri (AP-2, UPI-1)
- Brian Schweda, Kansas (AP-1)
- John Strohmyer, Nebraska (AP-2)

=== Middle guards ===
- **Carl McAdams**, Oklahoma (AP-1, UPI-1)
- Bob Mitts, Kansas State (AP-2, UPI-1)
- Walt Barnes, Nebraska (AP-1)

=== Linebackers ===
- **Mike Cox**, Iowa State (AP-1, UPI-1)
- Steve Sidwell, Colorado (AP-2)
- Mike Kennedy, Nebraska (AP-2)

=== Defensive backs ===
- **Gus Otto**, Missouri (AP-1, UPI-1)
- **Tom Vaughn**, Iowa State (AP-1, UPI-1)
- Gary Duff, Kansas (AP-1)
- Ken Boston, Missouri (AP-1)
- Johnny Roland, Missouri (AP-2)
- Ted Vactor, Nebraska (AP-2)
- Larry Shields, Oklahoma (AP-2)
- Ted Somerville, Colorado (AP-2)

== Key ==
AP = Associated Press

UPI = United Press International

== See also ==
- 1964 College Football All-America Team
