= 1962 All-Big Eight Conference football team =

American all-star college football team

The 1962 All-Big Eight Conference football team consists of American football players chosen by various organizations for All-Big Eight Conference teams for the 1962 NCAA University Division football season. The selectors for the 1962 season included the Associated Press (AP) and the United Press International (UPI). Players selected as first-team players by both the AP and UPI are designated in bold.

== All-Big Eight selections ==
=== Backs ===
- **Dave Hoppmann**, Iowa State (AP-1; UPI-1)
- **Gale Sayers**, Kansas (AP-1; UPI-1)
- Johnny Roland, Missouri (AP-1; UPI-2)
- Jim Grisham, Oklahoma (AP-1; UPI-2)
- Joe Don Looney, Oklahoma (AP-2; UPI-1)
- Dennis Claridge, Nebraska (AP-2; UPI-1)
- Willie Ross, Nebraska (AP-2; UPI-2)
- Tom Vaughn, Iowa St. (AP-2)
- Bill Thornton, Nebraska (UPI-2)

=== Ends ===
- **Conrad Hitchler**, Missouri (AP-1; UPI-1)
- **Ken Blair**, Colorado (AP-1; UPI-1)
- John Flynn, Oklahoma (AP-2; UPI-2)
- Jim Huge, Nebraska (AP-2; UPI-2)

=== Tackles ===
- **Dennis Ward**, Oklahoma (AP-1; UPI-1)
- Tyrone Robertson, Nebraska (AP-1; UPI-2)
- Jerry Wallach, Missouri (AP-2; UPI-1)
- Marvin Clothier, Kansas (AP-2)
- Ralph Neely, Oklahoma (UPI-2)

=== Guards ===
- **Leon Cross**, Oklahoma (AP-1; UPI-1)
- **Tom Hertz**, Missouri (AP-1; UPI-1)
- Dwain Carlson, Nebraska (AP-2; UPI-2)
- Mike Upton, Oklahoma St. (AP-2)
- Robert Brown, Missouri (UPI-2)

=== Centers ===
- **Wayne Lee**, Oklahoma (AP-1; UPI-1)
- Jim Vermillion, Missouri (AP-2; UPI-2)

== Key ==
AP = Associated Press

UPI = United Press International

== See also ==
- 1962 College Football All-America Team
