= Olney Independent School District =

School district in Texas, United States

Olney Independent School District is a school district headquartered in Olney, Texas (USA).

The district serves portions of Young County (including the city of Olney), Archer County (including the town of Megargel), Baylor County, and Throckmorton County.

In 2009, the school district was rated "recognized" by the Texas Education Agency.

== Schools ==
- Olney High School
- Olney Junior High School
- Olney Elementary School

== History ==
Prior to fall 2006, Megargel ISD served the town of Megargel and portions of Archer, Baylor, Throckmorton, and Young Counties, while Olney ISD served Olney and portions of Archer and Young counties.

Megargel School (along with the town of Megargel) had declined for years, and was running out of funds. The school board voted to consolidate with Olney ISD, subject to voter approval on May 13, 2006. The vote was in favor of consolidation with 79% of voters in favor. The school and district closed after the school year ended. Olney ISD announced plans to hire former Megargel ISD employees.
