= Addison Baker =

United States Air Force Medal of Honor recipient

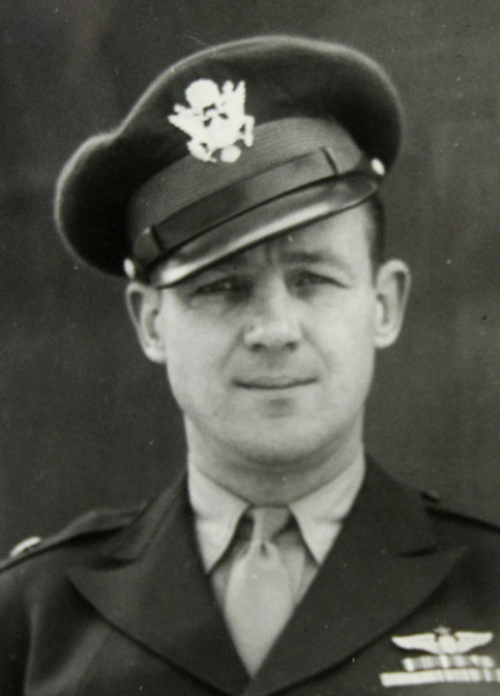
- Addison Baker
- Born: January 1, 1907; Chicago, Illinois, U.S.
- Died: August 1, 1943 (aged 36); Ploiești, Romania
- Burial place: Arlington National Cemetery
- Military career
- Allegiance: United States of America
- Branch: United States Army Air Corps; United States Army Air Forces
- Service years: 1929–1943
- Rank: Lieutenant Colonel
- Commands: 93rd Bombardment Group (Heavy)
- Conflicts: World War II: European air campaign; Oil campaign; Operation Tidal Wave †
- Awards: Medal of Honor; Silver Star; Distinguished Flying Cross; Purple Heart; Air Medal (3)

Lieutenant Colonel Addison Earl Baker (January 1, 1907 – August 1, 1943) was commander of the 93rd Bombardment Group (Heavy) in the U.S. Army Air Forces who led the group on the low-altitude Allied bombing mission of oil refineries at Ploieşti, Romania, Operation Tidal Wave. For his actions during World War II he received the United States of America's highest military decoration, the Medal of Honor (posthumously).

Baker joined the Army Air Corps from Akron, Ohio in 1929, and earned his wings and a commission in 1931.

== Early military service ==
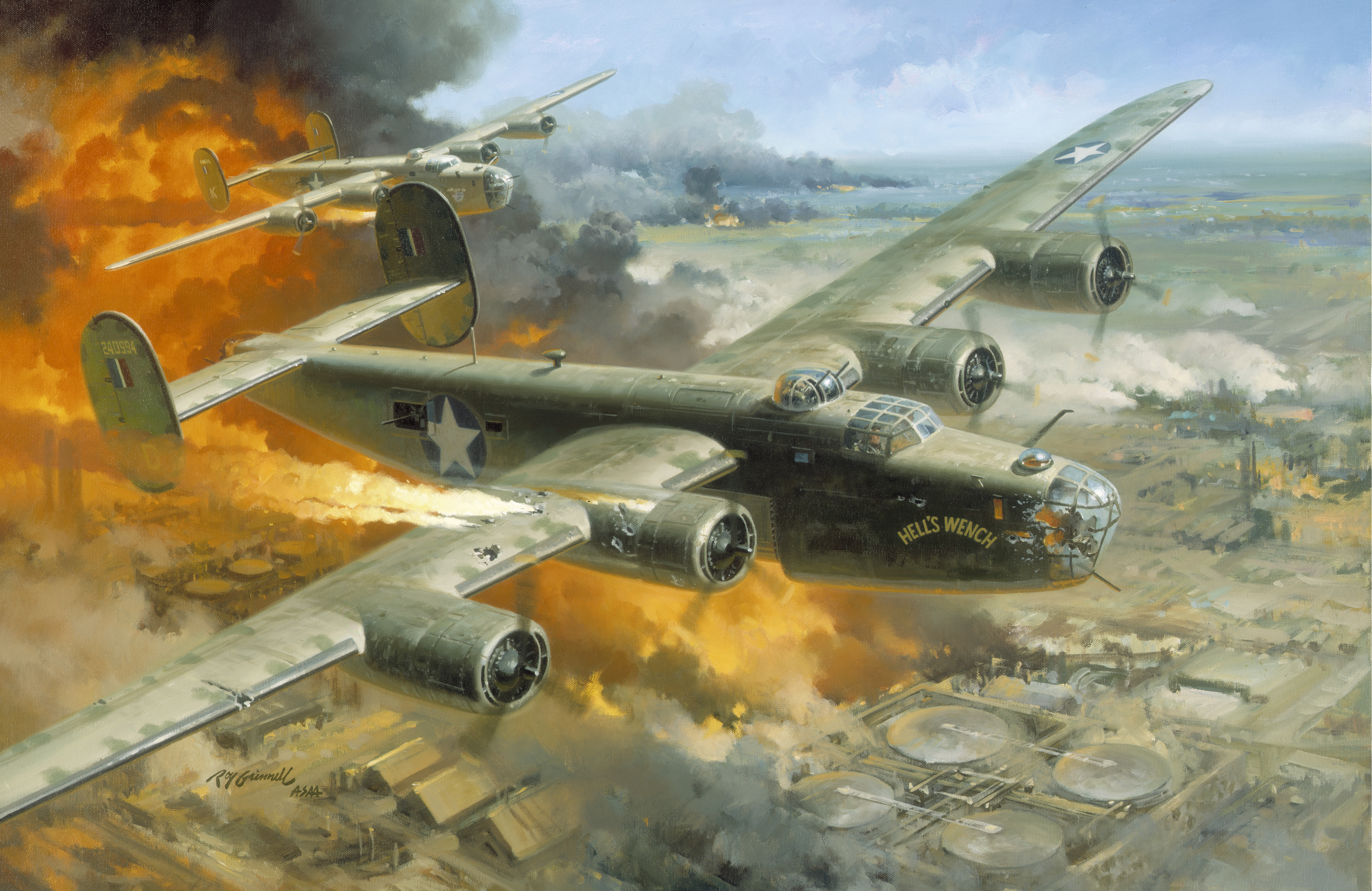
Hell's Wench over Ploesti, by Roy Grinnell

Baker enlisted in the Army Air Corps on January 17, 1929, and graduated from the Air Corps Training Center on February 28, 1931. He was commissioned a second lieutenant in the Officers' Reserve Corps on February 27, 1931. On July 6, 1934, he was commissioned in the Michigan National Guard, serving until October 5, 1935. He later transferred to the Ohio National Guard, and was commissioned in the 112th Observation Squadron on April 15, 1936. He was inducted into federal service on 25 November 1940. In early 1942, he was reassigned to the newly-activated 93rd Bombardment Group.

== Final mission ==
On August 1, 1943, the 93rd Bombardment Group, one of three group from the Eighth Air Force sent to the Ninth Air Force especially for this mission, took to the air at Benghazi, Libya. Piloting Hell's Wench, a B-24 Liberator (Serial 42-40994), Baker led the 93rd as the second formation in the five-group mission of 177 aircraft. Co-piloting the aircraft was a volunteer and former member of the 93d, Major John L. Jerstad.

When the force reached the target area, the lead group turned at the wrong point and flew towards Bucharest. Baker attempted to warn the mission commander of this error, but when that failed, led the remainder of the force to the correct turning point.

Although Hell's Wench had been seriously damaged by German anti-aircraft guns and was on fire, Baker maintained formation and bombed his target. Subsequently, Baker broke formation to avoid a mid-air collision with bombers from the lead group, now arriving in the target area from the opposite direction. He attempted to gain altitude so that his crew could escape from the doomed aircraft by parachute, but despite his efforts, Hell's Wench crashed and exploded, killing Baker and the other nine airmen aboard.

His body was initially not identified after being recovered by the Romanians, and he was buried as an unknown American in the Hero Section of the Civilian and Military Cemetery at Ploieşti. After the war, the American Graves Registration Committee attempted to identify as many of the unknowns from the Ploieşti mission as possible, but Baker's remains were among those that were still unidentifiable with the forensics technology of the 1940s. He was memorialized on the Tablets of the Missing at the Florence American Cemetery and Memorial, in Florence, Italy. On April 13, 2022, the U.S. government's Defense POW/MIA Accounting Agency announced that Baker's remains had been identified on April 8, 2022 using modern forensics techniques. A rosette will be placed next to his name on the Tablets of the Missing to denote that he has been accounted for. Baker was laid to rest at Arlington National Cemetery on September 14, 2022.

== Honors ==
On March 11, 1944, Baker was posthumously awarded the Medal of Honor. Major Jerstad also received the Medal of Honor, on October 28, 1943, for his role on the mission.

Army Air Forces Pilot Badge
Medal of Honor	Silver Star	Distinguished Flying Cross
Purple Heart	Air Medal with two bronze oak leaf clusters	American Defense Service Medal
American Campaign Medal	European–African–Middle Eastern Campaign Medal with silver campaign star	World War II Victory Medal

Army Presidential Unit Citation
with bronze oak leaf cluster

=== Medal of Honor citation ===
Rank and organization: Lieutenant Colonel, U.S. Army Air Corps, 93d Heavy Bombardment Group. Place and date: Ploesti Raid, Rumania, August 1, 1943. Entered service at: Akron, Ohio. Born: January 1, 1907, Chicago, Ill. G.O. No.: 20, March 11, 1944.

For conspicuous gallantry and intrepidity above and beyond the call of duty in action with the enemy on August 1, 1943. On this date he led his command, the 93d Heavy Bombardment Group, on a daring low-level attack against enemy oil refineries and installations at Ploesti, Rumania. Approaching the target, his aircraft was hit by a large caliber antiaircraft shell, seriously damaged and set on fire. Ignoring the fact he was flying over terrain suitable for safe landing, he refused to jeopardize the mission by breaking up the lead formation and continued unswervingly to lead his group to the target upon which he dropped his bombs with devastating effect. Only then did he leave formation, but his valiant attempts to gain sufficient altitude for the crew to escape by parachute were unavailing and his aircraft crashed in flames after his successful efforts to avoid other planes in formation. By extraordinary flying skill, gallant leadership and intrepidity, Lt. Col. Baker rendered outstanding, distinguished, and valorous service to our Nation.

== See also ==
- List of Medal of Honor recipients for World War II
