= Roy W. Harmon =

United States Army soldier

Roy Woodroe Harmon
- Born: May 3, 1916; Talala, Oklahoma, U.S.
- Died: July 12, 1944 (aged 28) near Casaglia, Italy
- Burial place: Florence American Cemetery, Florence, Italy
- Military career
- Allegiance: United States
- Branch: United States Army
- Rank: Sergeant
- Units: 362nd Infantry Regiment, 91st Infantry Division
- Conflicts: World War II
- Awards: Medal of Honor; Purple Heart

Roy Woodroe Harmon (May 3, 1916 – July 12, 1944) was a United States Army soldier and a recipient of the United States military's highest decoration—the Medal of Honor—for his actions in World War II.

== Biography ==
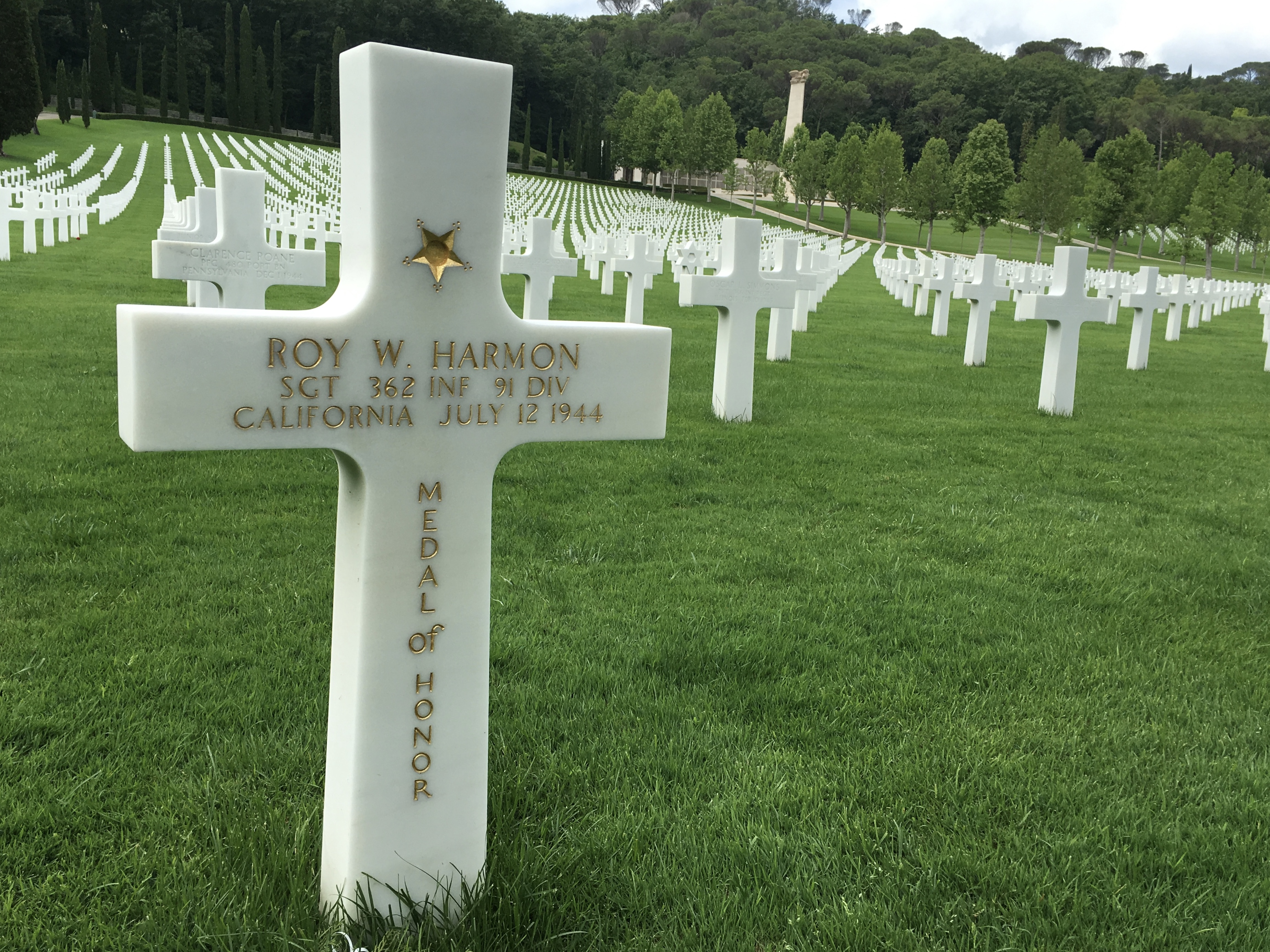
Grave marker of Roy Harmon, American Military Cemetery, Florence, Italy

Harmon joined the Army from Pixley, California, and by July 12, 1944, was serving as a Sergeant in Company C, 362nd Infantry Regiment, 91st Infantry Division. On that day, near Casaglia, Italy, he single-handedly attacked three German positions which were firing on a friendly platoon. He destroyed one position and, despite being wounded on his approach, continued to silence another. He was killed while attacking the third position. For these actions, he was posthumously awarded the Medal of Honor a year later, on October 2, 1945. Harmon was buried at the Florence American Cemetery in Florence, Italy.

== Medal of Honor citation ==
Sergeant Harmon's official Medal of Honor citation reads:

He was an acting squad leader when heavy machinegun fire from enemy positions, well dug in on commanding ground and camouflaged by haystacks, stopped his company's advance and pinned down 1 platoon where it was exposed to almost certain annihilation. Ordered to rescue the beleaguered platoon by neutralizing the German automatic fire, he led his squad forward along a draw to the right of the trapped unit against 3 key positions which poured murderous fire into his helpless comrades. When within range, his squad fired tracer bullets in an attempt to set fire to the 3 haystacks which were strung out in a loose line directly to the front, 75, 150, and 250 yards away. Realizing that this attack was ineffective, Sgt. Harmon ordered his squad to hold their position and voluntarily began a 1-man assault. Carrying white phosphorus grenades and a submachine gun, he skillfully took advantage of what little cover the terrain afforded and crept to within 25 yards of the first position. He set the haystack afire with a grenade, and when 2 of the enemy attempted to flee from the inferno, he killed them with his submachine gun. Crawling toward the second machinegun emplacement, he attracted fire and was wounded; but he continued to advance and destroyed the position with hand grenades, killing the occupants. He then attacked the third machinegun, running to a small knoll, then crawling over ground which offered no concealment or cover. About halfway to his objective, he was again wounded. But he struggled ahead until within 20 yards of the machinegun nest, where he raised himself to his knees to throw a grenade. He was knocked down by direct enemy fire. With a final, magnificent effort, he again arose, hurled the grenade and fell dead, riddled by bullets. His missile fired the third position, destroying it. Sgt. Harmon's extraordinary heroism, gallantry, and self-sacrifice saved a platoon from being wiped out, and made it possible for his company to advance against powerful enemy resistance.

== See also ==
- List of Medal of Honor recipients for World War II
