= George D. Keathley =

US Army staff sergeant

George Dennis Keathley
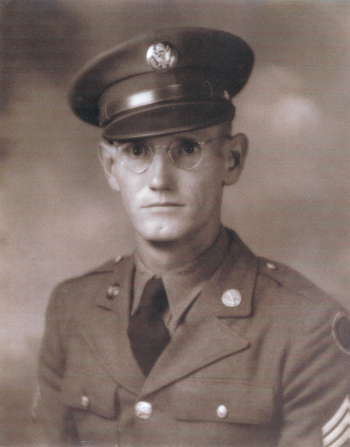
- Born: November 10, 1907; Olney, Texas, US
- Died: September 14, 1944 (aged 36); Mount Altuzzo, Italy
- Burial place: Florence American Cemetery and Memorial, Florence, Italy
- Military career
- Allegiance: United States
- Branch: United States Army
- Service years: 1942–1944
- Rank: Staff Sergeant
- Units: Company B, 338th Infantry Regiment, 85th Infantry Division
- Conflicts: World War II
- Awards: Medal of Honor; Bronze Star Medal; Purple Heart

George Dennis Keathley (November 10, 1907 – September 14, 1944) was a staff sergeant in the United States Army who received the Medal of Honor for his actions during World War II.

== Biography ==
Born in Olney, Texas in 1907, Keathley attended Olney High School and Cameron Junior College, now Cameron University, in Lawton, OK. He attended the Agricultural & Mechanical College of Texas, today known as Texas A&M University, in 1937. He never graduated due to financial reasons.

He joined the Army from Lamesa, Texas, and by September 14, 1944, was serving as a staff sergeant in Company B, 338th Infantry Regiment, 85th Infantry Division. During an enemy counterattack on that day, at Mount Altuzzo, Italy, Keathley took command of three platoons which had been left leaderless due to heavy casualties. He organized the platoons' defense, gathered ammunition, and encouraged his men even after being severely wounded. He died of his injuries shortly after the attack was repulsed. For these actions, Keathley was posthumously awarded the Medal of Honor six months later, on March 29, 1945.

Keathley, aged 36 at his death, was buried at the Florence American Cemetery in Florence, Italy.

Keathley's Medal of Honor is on permanent display at Texas A&M University's Sanders Corps of Cadets Center. The medal was donated to the museum by his family on July 17, 2009. Also at Texas A&M is the Keathley Hall dormitory, named in his honor.

== Medal of Honor citation ==
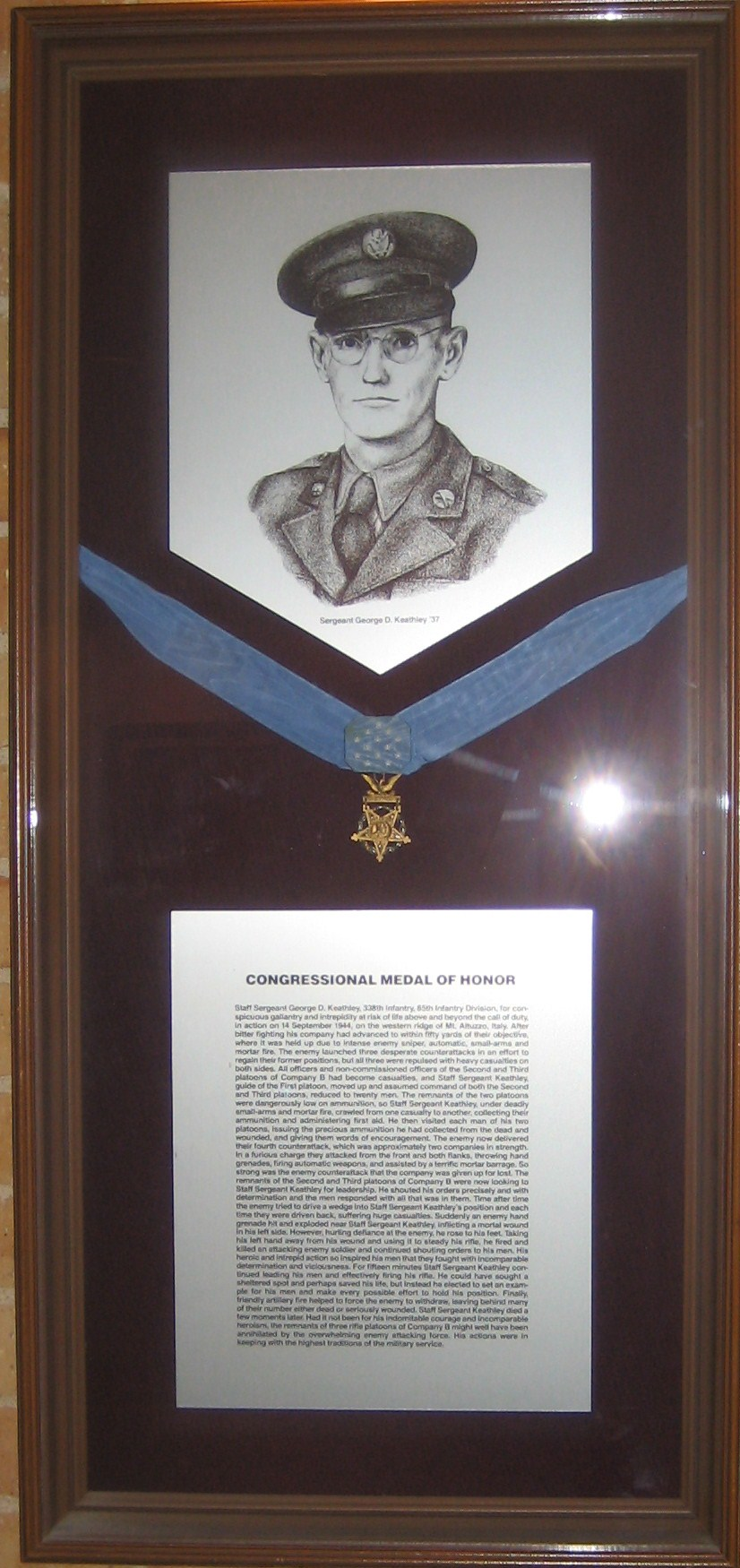
George D. Keathley and a specimen Medal of Honor on display at Texas A&M University

For conspicuous gallantry and intrepidity at risk of life above and beyond the call of duty, in action on the western ridge of Mount Altuzzo, Italy. After bitter fighting his company had advanced to within 50 yards of the objective, where it was held up due to intense enemy sniper, automatic, small arms, and mortar fire. The enemy launched 3 desperate counterattacks in an effort to regain their former positions, but all 3 were repulsed with heavy casualties on both sides. All officers and noncommissioned officers of the 2d and 3d platoons of Company B had become casualties, and S/Sgt. Keathley, guide of the 1st platoon, moved up and assumed command of both the 2d and 3d platoons, reduced to 20 men. The remnants of the 2 platoons were dangerously low on ammunition, so S/Sgt. Keathley, under deadly small arms and mortar fire, crawled from 1 casualty to another, collecting their ammunition and administering first aid. He then visited each man of his 2 platoons, issuing the precious ammunition he had collected from the dead and wounded, and giving them words of encouragement. The enemy now delivered their fourth counterattack, which was approximately 2 companies in strength. In a furious charge they attacked from the front and both flanks, throwing hand grenades, firing automatic weapons, and assisted by a terrific mortar barrage. So strong was the enemy counterattack that the company was given up for lost. The remnants of the 2d and 3d platoons of Company B were now looking to S/Sgt. Keathley for leadership. He shouted his orders precisely and with determination and the men responded with all that was in them. Time after time the enemy tried to drive a wedge into S/Sgt. Keathley's position and each time they were driven back, suffering huge casualties. Suddenly an enemy hand grenade hit and exploded near S/Sgt. Keathley, inflicting a mortal wound in his left side. However, hurling defiance at the enemy, he rose to his feet. Taking his left hand away from his wound and using it to steady his rifle, he fired and killed an attacking enemy soldier, and continued shouting orders to his men. His heroic and intrepid action so inspired his men that they fought with incomparable determination and viciousness. For 15 minutes S/Sgt. Keathley continued leading his men and effectively firing his rifle. He could have sought a sheltered spot and perhaps saved his life, but instead he elected to set an example for his men and make every possible effort to hold his position. Finally, friendly artillery fire helped to force the enemy to withdraw, leaving behind many of their number either dead or seriously wounded. S/Sgt. Keathley died a few moments later. Had it not been for his indomitable courage and incomparable heroism, the remnants of 3 rifle platoons of Company B might well have been annihilated by the overwhelming enemy attacking force. His actions were in keeping with the highest traditions of the military service.

== Awards and decorations ==

Badge	Combat Infantryman Badge		
1st row	Medal of Honor		
2nd row	Bronze Star Medal	Purple Heart	Army Good Conduct Medal
3rd row	American Campaign Medal	European–African–Middle Eastern Campaign Medal with 1 campaign star	World War II Victory Medal

== Namesakes ==
USNS Sgt. George D. Keathley (T-APC-117), was a World War II United States cargo vessel that was used for troop transport and later converted to a survey vessel. It was named after George D. Keathley

== See also ==
- List of Medal of Honor recipients for World War II
