= Jewish monumental cemetery, Florence =

Memorial cemetery

Coordinates: 43°46′10″N 11°14′19″E

The Jewish monumental cemetery in Florence (Cimitero monumentale ebraico) is a monumental cemetery on the current Ariosto avenue, just outside the ancient Renaissance walls, as it was not allowed to bury Jews in the city. It is open once a month, only on last Sundays, with two guided tours in the morning.

== History ==
The graveyard was built in 1777 outside the San Frediano gate and remained in operation until 1870, when a new one was opened in Caciolle, in the Rifredi area.

The site is of historical and artistic interest for the tombs (the oldest date back to the 18th century), surrounded by multi-storey houses, which somewhat depict the decadent and romantic charm. The part on the left of the entrance was expropriated by the Commune to erect a dispensary, today asylum: there were tombs of the 18th century, which on that occasion were dismantled and recompiled to the best and best in the area near the entrance, with some inscriptions mounted. No grave has the image of the deceased, according to Jewish custom.

== Monumental tombs ==
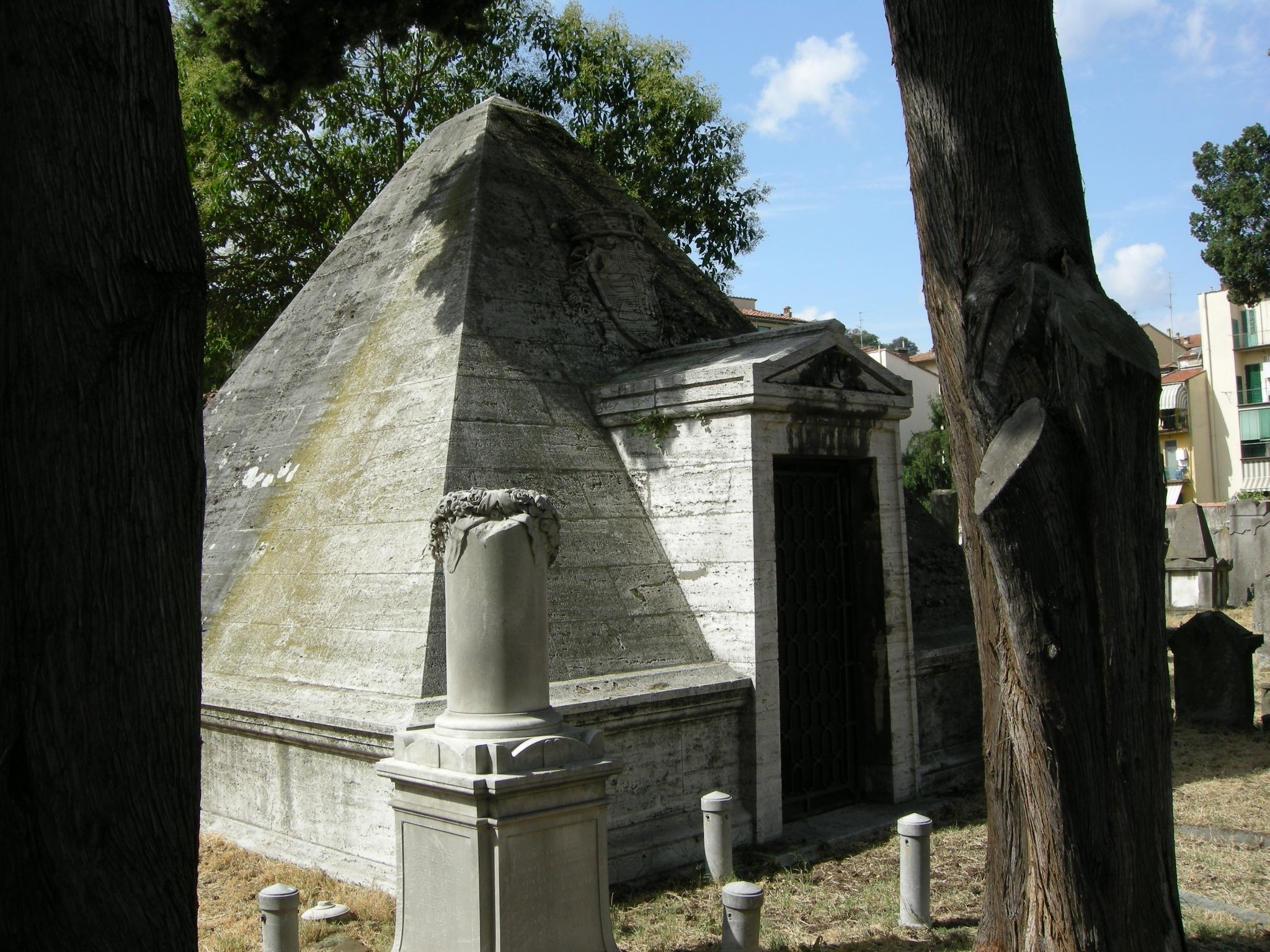
The Pyramid

Jewish culture, in accordance with rigid biblical teaching, does not appreciate the idea of glamor and wealth, so monumental tombs are usually very rare. There are only three in this cemetery, lined up along the central avenue with cypresses and dating back to the period after the unification of Italy, when the Kingdom was excommunicated by Pope Pius IX and religious minorities were able to enjoy a tolerant climate.

The first of the Levi family has a pyramidal shape that recalls the Egyptian tombs with references to the symbolic tradition of French Enlightenment: the triangle seen as a perfect figure that pervades perfection. The pyramid is placed on a tall base, made of squared blocks of stone and illuminated inside by a small eye on the south side, as well as from the entrance door. The latter is crowned by a triangular pediment and the family coat of arms. In the cell are still visible twisted crowns of flowers and leaves, probably left there by the original funeral ritual.

The second chapel, next to the pyramid, is smaller and even inspired by the neo-gestic style. It belonged to the Servadio family and was executed around 1875. It has beam columns and inside the sculpted symbol of winged sun; on the underlying sarcophagus a crown is carved. The coat of arms is on the stand. Today the exterior of the chapel is largely hidden by vegetation.

The third chapel of the Franchetti family was probably designed by architect Marco Treves also author of the synagogue in Florence and the resettlement of the small building at the entrance. It is a kiosk covered with a barrel vault. The walls are open and marked by pillars, with a cornice running outside and an arched pediment, all finely decorated.

== Other tombs ==
There are many types and sizes of the tombs, from those to sarcophagus to those of cippo, from simple tombstones to broken columns. The most elaborate sarcophagi are raised by leopard paws and supported by other structures, with carved scarves, crowns of garland, etc.

There are two burial tombs with columns, recalling some of the 19th-century rhetorical works, such as theatrical scenery. It dates back to 1846 and was carved by Aronne Sanguinetti for Chiara Rafael: it has Doric columns, fronts and acrobats.

Epitaphs are generally written in Hebrew and in Italian.

== Notes ==
- G. Trotta-M. Bencivieni, The secret city.
