= Olney, Texas =

- City
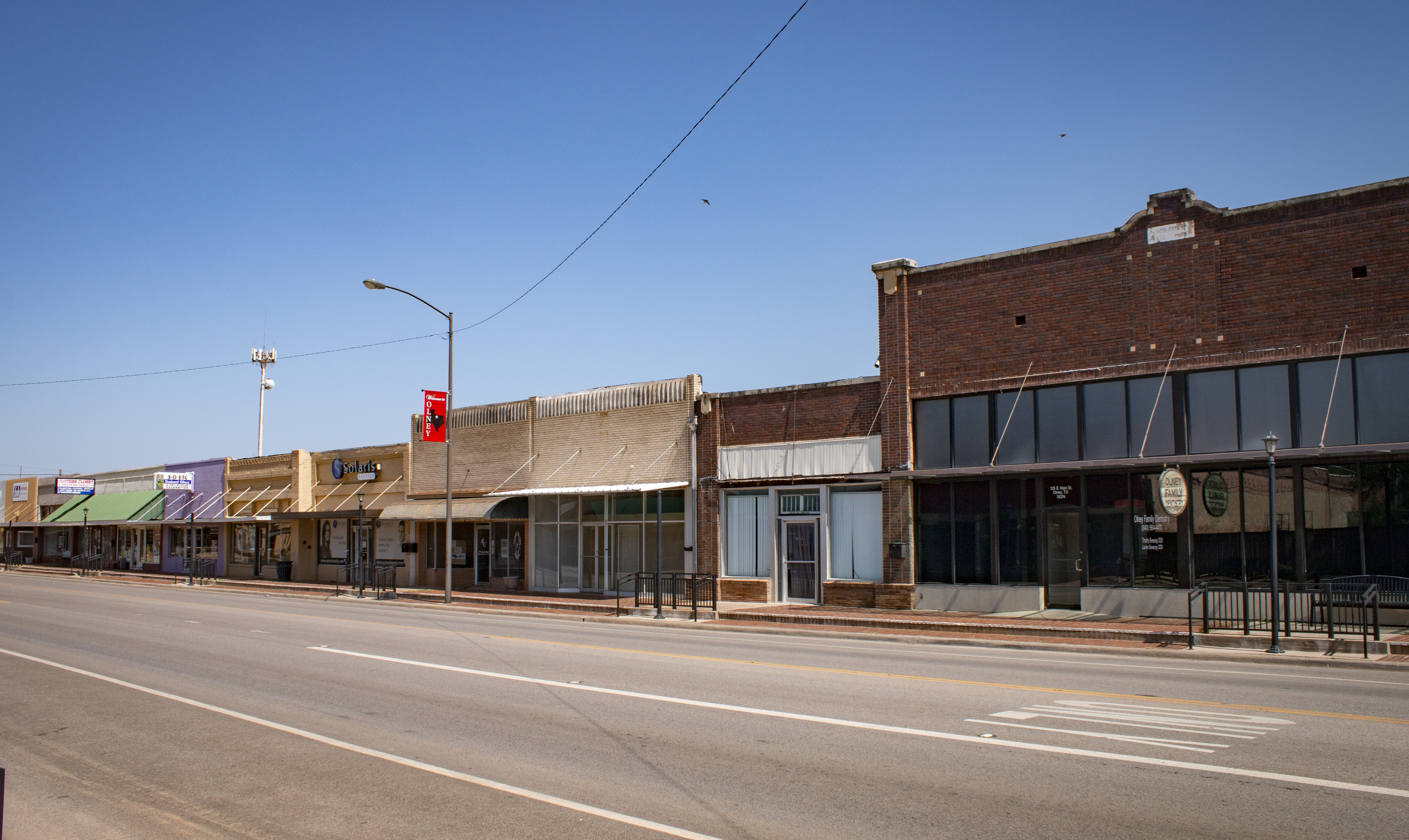
- Downtown Olney (2016)

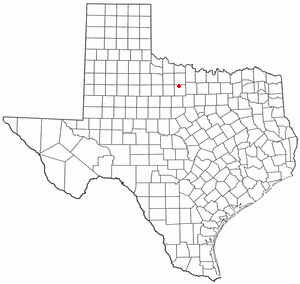
- Location of Olney, Texas

- Coordinates: 33°22′5″N 98°45′29″W
- Country: United States
- State: Texas
- County: Young
- Incorporated (city): 1909

Government
  - Type: Mayor-Council
  - Mayor: Robert "Rue" Rogers
  - Mayor Pro-Tem: Tom Parker
  - Councilmembers: Tommy Kimbro, Chuck Stennett, Phil Jeske II, Terri Wipperman

Area
  - Total: 2.03 sq mi (5.25 km^{2})
  - Land: 2.02 sq mi (5.24 km^{2})
  - Water: 0.0039 sq mi (0.01 km^{2})
- Elevation: 1,184 ft (361 m)

Population (2020)
  - Total: 3,007
  - Density: 1,490/sq mi (574/km^{2})
- Demonym: Olneyan
- Time zone: UTC-6 (Central (CST))
  - Summer (DST): UTC-5 (CDT)
- ZIP code: 76374
- Area code: 940
- FIPS code: 48-54000
- GNIS feature ID: 1364537
- Website: www.cityofolneytx.com

Olney is a city in Young County, Texas, United States. Its population was 3,007 as of the 2020 census.

== History ==
On May 18, 1951, the city was devastated by a violent F4 tornado. Thomas P. Grazulis noted this tornado was a possible F5 on the Fujita scale.

== Geography ==
Olney is located at 33°22′5″N 98°45′29″W (33.368181, –98.758012).

According to the United States Census Bureau, the city has a total area of 2.0 sq mi (5.2 km^{2}), all land. The town is 45 miles south of Wichita Falls.

=== Climate ===
The climate in this area is characterized by hot, humid summers and generally mild to cool winters. According to the Köppen climate classification, Olney has a humid subtropical climate, Cfa on maps.

== Demographics ==
Historical population
Census	Pop.	Note	%±
1910	1,095		—
1920	1,164		6.3%
1930	4,138		255.5%
1940	3,497		−15.5%
1950	3,765		7.7%
1960	3,872		2.8%
1970	3,624		−6.4%
1980	4,060		12.0%
1990	3,519		−13.3%
2000	3,396		−3.5%
2010	3,285		−3.3%
2020	3,007		−8.5%
U.S. Decennial Census

=== 2020 census ===
As of the 2020 census, Olney had a population of 3,007, 1,269 households, and 821 families. The median age was 40.0 years, with 24.7% of residents under the age of 18 and 18.5% of residents 65 years of age or older. For every 100 females there were 98.0 males, and for every 100 females age 18 and over there were 92.5 males age 18 and over.

0.0% of residents lived in urban areas, while 100.0% lived in rural areas.

There were 1,269 households in Olney, of which 29.9% had children under the age of 18 living in them. Of all households, 40.0% were married-couple households, 22.7% were households with a male householder and no spouse or partner present, and 31.0% were households with a female householder and no spouse or partner present. About 34.9% of all households were made up of individuals and 15.9% had someone living alone who was 65 years of age or older.

There were 1,495 housing units, of which 15.1% were vacant. The homeowner vacancy rate was 3.0% and the rental vacancy rate was 12.3%.

Racial composition as of the 2020 census
Race	Number	Percent
White	2,273	75.6%
Black or African American	90	3.0%
American Indian and Alaska Native	27	0.9%
Asian	23	0.8%
Native Hawaiian and Other Pacific Islander	0	0.0%
Some other race	256	8.5%
Two or more races	338	11.2%
Hispanic or Latino (of any race)	743	24.7%

=== 2000 census ===
As of the census of 2000, 3,396 people, 1,405 households, and 896 families were residing in the city. The population density was 1,654.8 people/s mi (639.6/km^{2}). The 1,668 housing units averaged 812.8/sq mi (314.2/km^{2}). The racial makeup of the city was 89.78% White, 2.47% African American, 0.80% Native American, 0.12% Asian, 4.62% from other races, and 2.21% from two or more races. Hispanics or Latinos of any race were 14.43% of the population.

Out of the 1,405 households, 31.0% had children under 18 living with them, 47.3% were married couples living together, 12.9% had a female householder with no husband present, and 36.2% were not families. About 33.0% of all households were made up of individuals, and 18.0% had someone living alone who was 65 or older. The average household size was 2.34, and the average family size was 2.97.

In the city, the age distribution was 25.9% under 18, 7.9% from 18 to 24, 24.0% from 25 to 44, 20.3% from 45 to 64, and 22.0% who were 65 or older. The median age was 40 years. For every 100 females, there were 81.9 males. For every 100 females age 18 and over, there were 76.3 males.

The median income for a household in the city was $21,991, and for a family was $29,274. Males had a median income of $27,500 versus $16,466 for females. The per capita income for the city was $13,723. About 18.3% of families and 21.4% of the population were below the poverty line, including 24.8% of those under age 18 and 20.3% of those age 65 or over.

== Economy ==
Olney Municipal Airport is three miles southwest of the city, and includes the Air Tractor company with 450 employees, manufacturing agricultural aircraft (some of which has been modified for military and first responder use). The airport is the flight test site for the Carter PAV, as well as training for the 2014 Red Bull Air Race World Championship.

== Education ==
Olney is served by the Olney Independent School District.

The designated community college for most of Young County (including Olney ISD) is Ranger Junior College.

=== Olney Community Library and Arts Center ===
The Olney Community Library and Arts Center is located on the Olney school campus at 807 W. Hamilton.

== Notable people ==
- Kyle Clifton, former National Football League (NFL) player
- Jim Grisham, former NFL player
- George D. Keathley, Medal of Honor recipient
- Bob Lilly, Dallas Cowboy defensive tackle and member of the Pro Football Hall of Fame
- Bob Oliver, American football player
- Johnny Vaught, Ole Miss head coach, member of the College Football Hall of Fame
- James Vick, UFC lightweight fighter

== Gallery ==
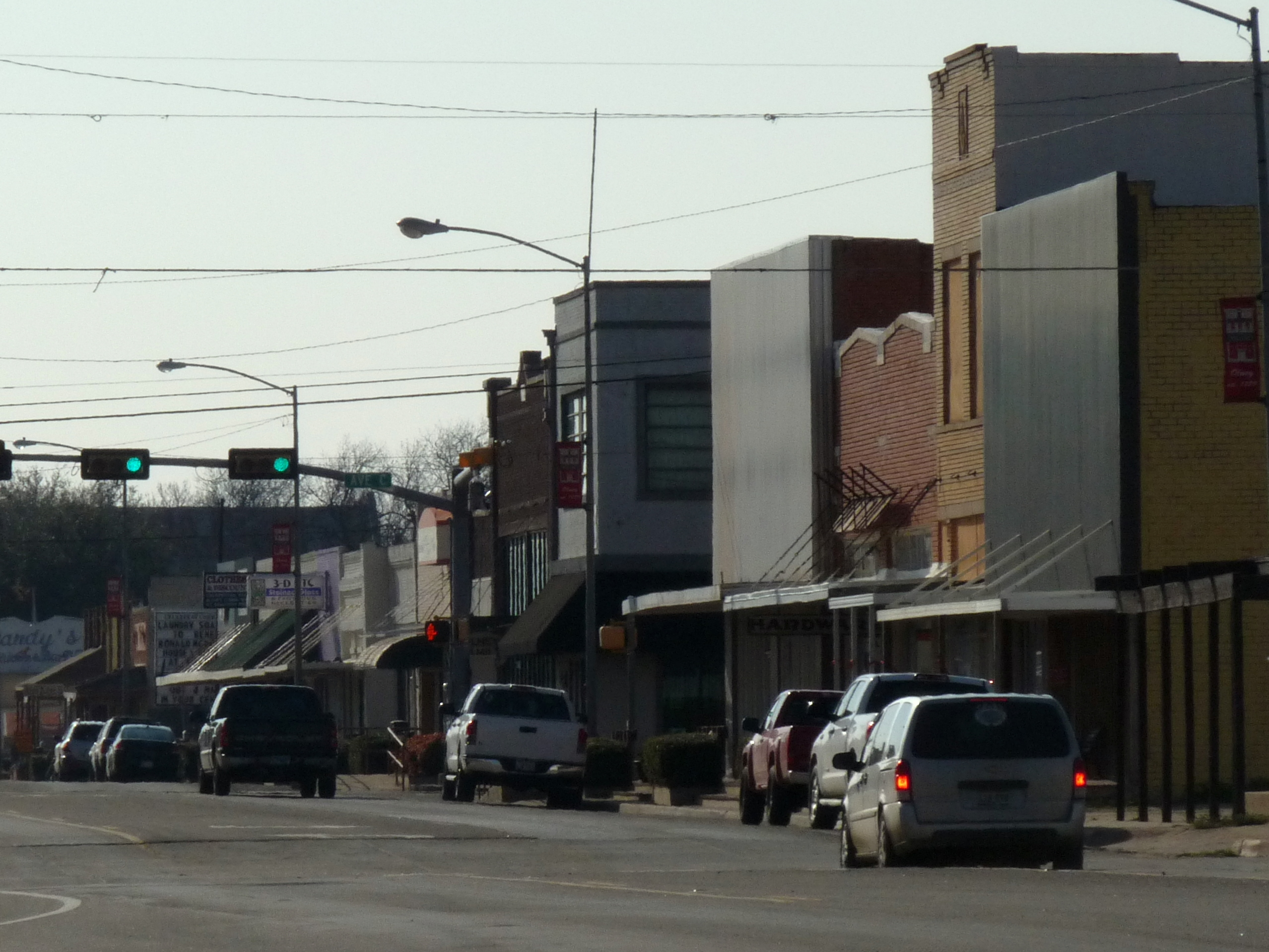
South side of Olney's Main Street, Texas State Highway 114.

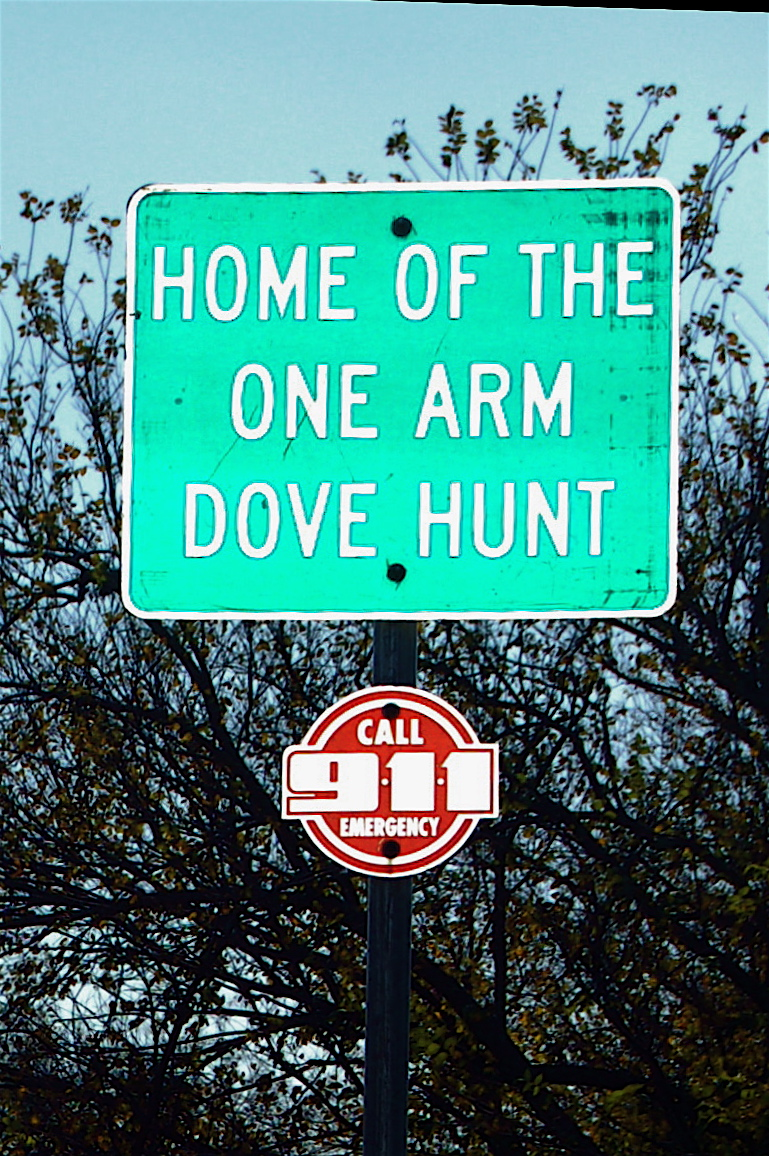
Sign promoting the One-Arm Dove Hunt.

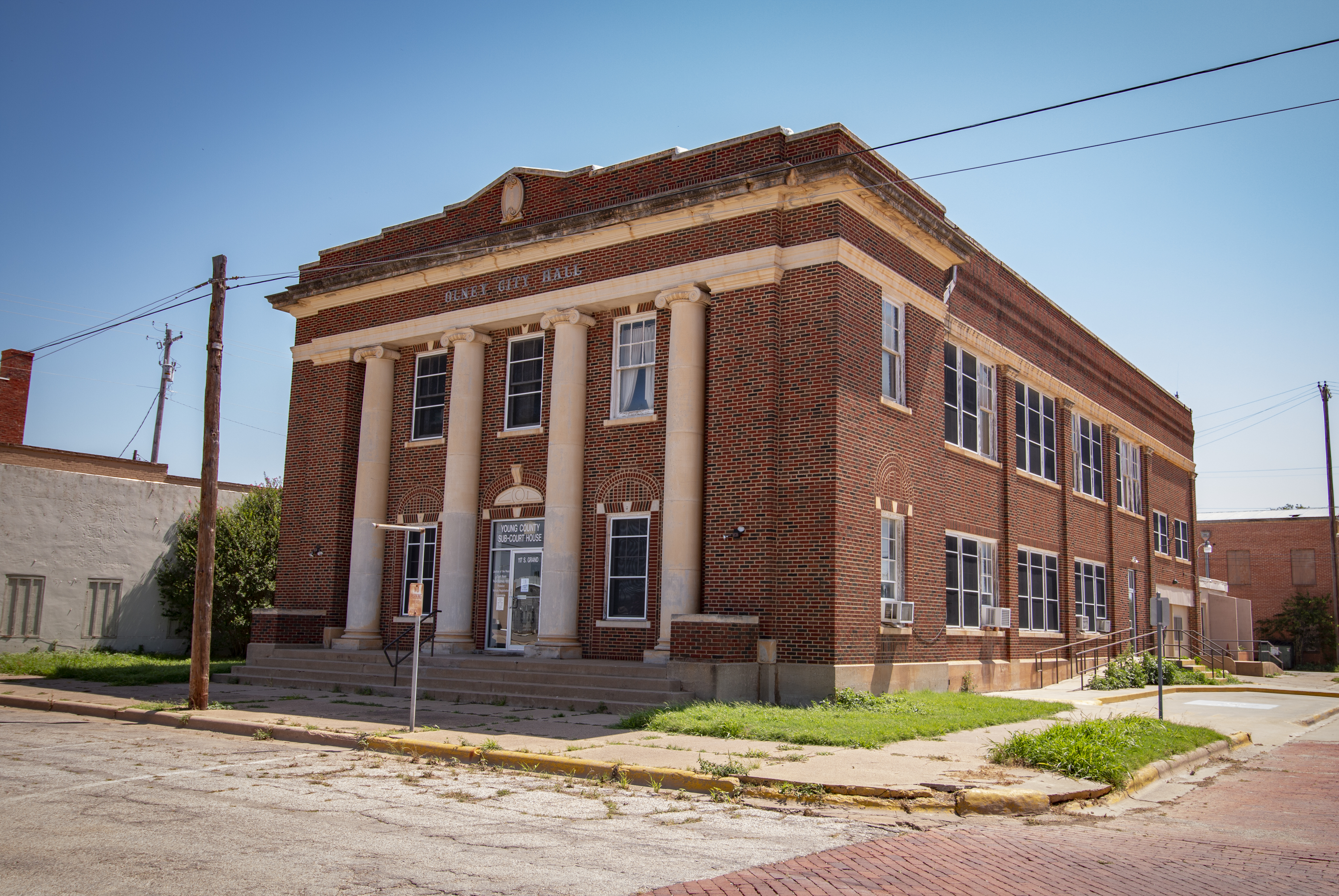
City Hall.

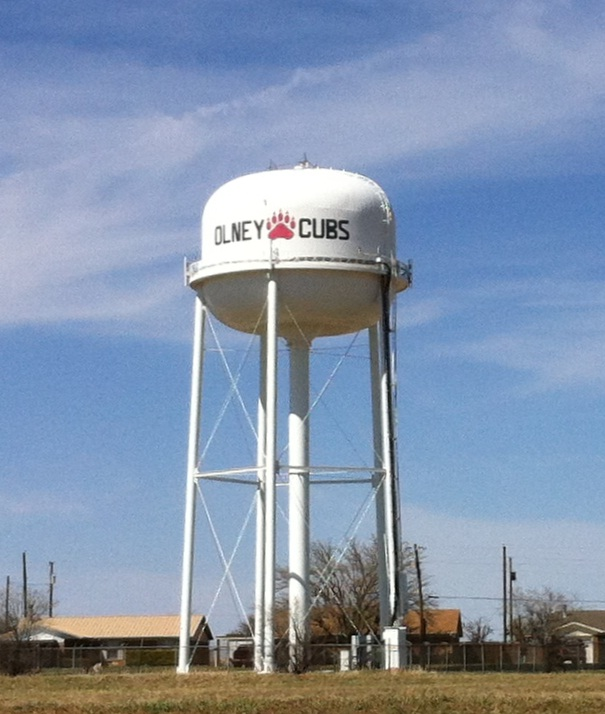
Olney water tower.
