= Memorial Stadium (Wichita Falls) =

Stadium in Wichita Falls, Texas

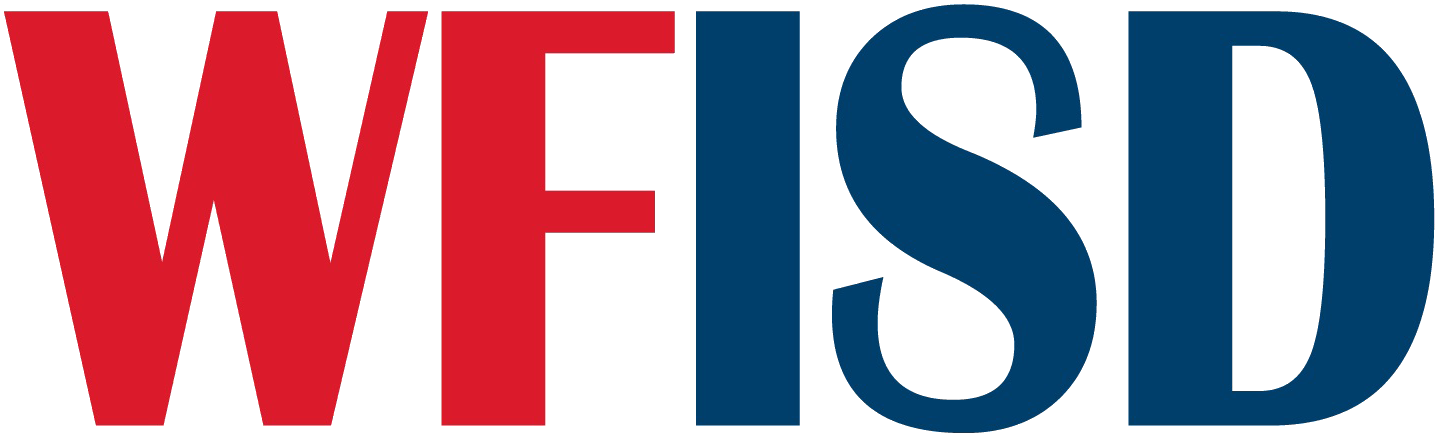

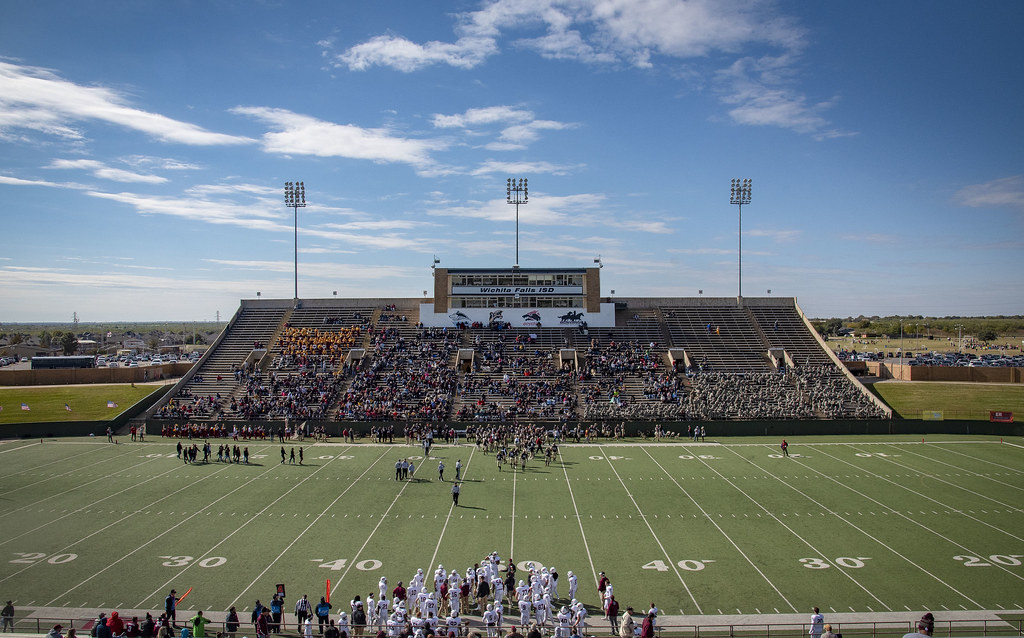
- Interior of the stadium in 2018
- Interactive map of Memorial Stadium
- Address: Southwest Parkway at Barnett Road; Wichita Falls, Texas; United States
- Coordinates: 33°51′15″N 98°34′57″W
- Owner: Wichita Falls ISD
- Operator: WFISD Athletics
- Capacity: 14,500
- Type: Stadium
- Current use: Football; Soccer

Construction
- Opened: 1970; 56 years ago

Tenant
- List: NCAA: Midwestern State Mustangs (NCAA) (1988–present); Pioneer Bowl (1971–1978, 1981–1982); UIL: Hirschi High School Huskies (1971–2024); Rider High School Raiders (1971–2024); Wichita Falls High School Coyotes (1971–2024); Legacy Leopards; Memorial Mavericks; Other tenants/events: Wichita Falls Nighthawks (PAFL/GDFL) (2013–2014); Oil Bowl

Website
- wfisd.net/memorial-stadium

Memorial Stadium is an American football and soccer stadium in Wichita Falls, Texas located on Southwest Parkway at Barnett Road. It is owned and operated by the Wichita Falls Independent School District.

Memorial Stadium was home to the Hirschi High School, S. H. Rider High School, and Wichita Falls High School athletics teams until those schools were closed in May 2024, and now hosts their successors, Wichita Falls Legacy High School and Wichita Falls Memorial High School. It has also served as the home of the Midwestern State University football program since 1988.

From 1971 through 1978, and also in 1981 and 1982, the stadium hosted various NCAA playoff games, at the Division II and Division I-A levels, known as the Pioneer Bowl.

== History ==
Built in 1970, the stadium can seat 14,500 fans with room for 2,500 more and is one of the largest high school football stadiums in the state of Texas. Some of the stadium's attractions include parking for up to 3,600 cars, a two-story press box for visiting coaches, dignitaries, and the media, as well as an artificial turf playing surface and a state of the art scoreboard, most of which were added several years after the stadium's initial opening. Every summer, Memorial Stadium is host to the Oil Bowl Classic, an annual high school all-star football game that pits the best football players from Texas against those from Oklahoma.

On April 10, 1979, Memorial Stadium was severely damaged when an F4 tornado tore through the southwest portion of Wichita Falls, the winds only measuring up to an F3 on the Fujita scale while the tornado was directly on top of the stadium, however. The tornado in question also brought upon extremely severe damage to the town of Wichita Falls, causing major safety reforms to buildings and a massive rebuild of the town and the infrastructure within it. That Tuesday in April 1979 hosted the creation of several smaller but equally devastating tornados around the Red River Valley area in what is known as the 1979 Red River Valley tornado outbreak, often casually referred to as "Terrible Tuesday."

During a discussion of the proposal for a new MSU stadium on the site of Sikes Senter Mall, MSU President Stacy Haynie suggested that WFISD schools could also use the new stadium in the future and that Memorial Stadium's days may be numbered. "We would love to have local high schools playing at the MSU stadium in the future. I think Memorial (Stadium) has served its useful purpose, and to renovate that stadium would be a very expensive venture."

Preceded by none Hughes Stadium	Host of the NCAA Div. I football championship 1978; 1981–1982	Succeeded by Orlando Stadium; Johnson Hagood Stadium
