= Joe Cutbirth =

American journalist and academic

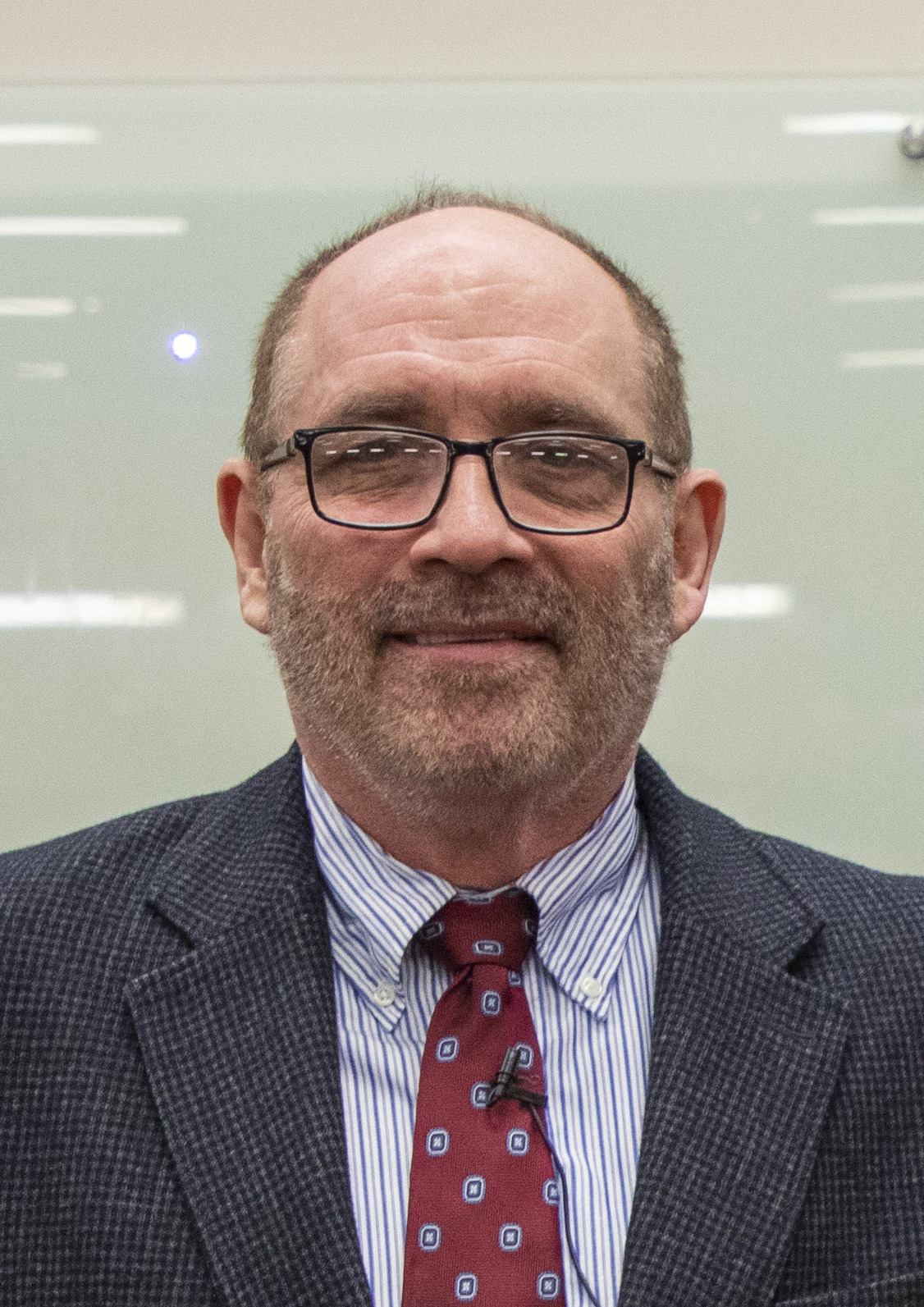
Joe Cutbirth (2019)

Joe Cutbirth (born 1956) is an American scholar, journalist, and media critic, who currently teaches in the communication and journalism programs at The University of Texas at Austin. He is a former editor-in-chief of the Texas Observer, political blogger for The Huffington Post, and was a recurring analyst for ABC News Now during the 2008 presidential primaries and general election. He has taught at the Columbia University Graduate School of Journalism, New York University, the University of British Columbia Graduate School of Journalism, The University of Virginia, and The New School. He was a statehouse reporter and political writer for the Fort Worth Star-Telegram and served as the communications director for the Texas Democratic Party coordinated campaign during the Clinton-Gore 1996 and Ann Richards 1994 reelection efforts.

== Scholarship ==
Cutbirth's research examines the relationship between satire and journalism in American politics. He is working on his first book, Fake News, Real Politics: Jon Stewart and the New Political Press, an extension of the doctoral work he did at Columbia University under Todd Gitlin, James W. Carey and Herbert J. Gans.

He has lectured on the topic and offered a course, Fake News, Politics and Popular Culture, (2004–07) at the New School and NYU. He expanded the course in 2010 to include the Anglo-Irish tradition of satire and the reciprocal comedic tradition between Canada and the United States. He renamed it Satire as News, and offered it as a graduate seminar at UBC.

In explaining the course to Fox News in 2007 he said, "We examine what's gone wrong in the country, not in the relationship we have with politics, but in the relationship we have with mass media." When Radar Online in 2006 skewered Fake News as one of the top 10 "flimsiest classes" offered at an American university, Cutbirth told a reporter from the NYU student paper: "That's great news. It's not every day a slow white guy gets on a list with Tupac," referring to another course on Radar's list, The Textual Appeal of Tupac Shakur.

The New York Times, The Globe and Mail, Canadian Broadcasting Corporation, CTV, and Postmedia News all have cited him as an expert on fake news.

Cutbirth has presented his work at meetings of the National Communication Association, the American Political Science Association, the Midwest Association of Public Opinion Research, the Association for Education in Journalism and Mass Communication and at conferences at Georgetown University and the Massachusetts Institute of Technology.

Cutbirth paid homage to Carey in James Carey and the Columbia School, an essay he wrote and delivered as a representative of Carey’s Columbia students at Conversations & Communications: A Conference in Memory of James W. Carey.

== Politics and media criticism ==
As a blogger for The Huffington Post, Cutbirth has supported and criticized President Barack Obama, for whom Cutbirth voted in both the 2008 New York primary and general election.

In 2009 he chastised reporters traveling with Pope Benedict XVI for not pressing evidence when the Pope claimed condoms actually spread AIDS.

Cutbirth called on John McCain to apologize to Obama for racist overtones in the 2008 campaign, and he criticized Texas Governor Rick Perry for "secessionist demagoguery" at the Texas Capitol. He also questioned the veracity of reporters who allow Perry to call health care reform "socialized medicine", and he argued that ESPN ethics in the case of Craig James and former Texas Tech football coach Mike Leach "stink".

Other columns have offered commentary on media coverage of Sarah Palin, Harvey Milk, Caroline Kennedy and Pat Tillman.

He made the switch from journalism to political operative and pundit in 1994, when Governor Ann Richards hired him to be spokesman for the Texas Democratic Party and effectively "go one-on-one with" Bush Spokeswoman Karen Hughes.

== Journalism ==
Cutbirth spent more than a decade as a daily newspaper and wire service reporter, largely covering government and Texas politics.

He began his career at The Wichita Falls Times. In his first year there he won the International Reading Association Print Media Award for Why Can’t Johnnie Read?, an investigative series on illiteracy in America. He also received the Texas Women’s Political Caucus Chrysalis Award for exposing the city’s long-term disregard of a federal court order to counter decades of discrimination in the hiring of women police officers.

He worked briefly at the Morris News Service state capital bureau, where he covered Lloyd Bentsen’s 1988 vice presidential campaign until he was hired to cover state government and politics for the Fort Worth Star-Telegram. There he covered the Branch Davidian siege at Waco, Ann Richards’ successful 1990 gubernatorial bid, and the grand jury indictments on ethics charges of both Texas House Speaker Gib Lewis and U.S. Sen. Kay Bailey Hutchison. His story on Hutchison's acquittal received top statewide honor for deadline reporting from the Dallas Press Club, and his work on Lewis and the ethics climate in the Texas Legislature received a statewide citation from the Associated Press.

In 1992 he represented journalists from 10 Texas newspapers at the founding board meeting of the National Lesbian and Gay Journalists Association and served as the first chair of the Texas NLGJA chapter. He later was appointed to the board of NLGJA's Roy Aarons Education in Journalism Program.

His work has also appeared in the San Francisco Chronicle, Northwestern Magazine, Education Daily, the Texas Observer, the Texas Triangle, Wichita Falls City Magazine and on DogCanyon.org.

== Personal ==
Cutbirth was born in Wichita Falls, Texas, and graduated from S.H. Rider High School. He was an Eagle Scout and was state-ranked four times (in 14-and-under singles and doubles, and 16-and-under singles and doubles) by the Texas Tennis Association.

As an undergraduate at the University of Texas, he was a member of Kappa Alpha Order, served on the student government, was on the editorial board of The Daily Texan and worked on the Cactus (yearbook) staff. In 2018, Cutbirth formally severed his affiliation with his college fraternity, citing its historic association with Robert E. Lee as incompatible with his values and beliefs.

Cutbirth holds a Ph.D. in communications from Columbia University, an M.A. in communication, culture and technology from Georgetown University, and a bachelor's degree in journalism from the University of Texas at Austin.

He lists Richards, Milk and Bobby Kennedy as his heroes, and he describes himself as "a staunch disciple of the European Enlightenment; an unabashed fan of the University of Texas Longhorns football team; and an enthusiastic gourmand of Tex-Mex".
