= Black Rock Coalition =

U.S.-based organization promoting black musicians

The Black Rock Coalition is a New York-based artists' collective and nonprofit organization dedicated to promoting the creative freedom and works of black musicians.

== Founding and purpose ==
The BRC was founded in 1985 in New York City by Vernon Reid (guitarist for the rock band Living Colour), Greg Tate (journalist for the Village Voice), Dk Dyson (lead singer of Eye & I), and Konda Mason (producer), but today has members from around the world. Members that helped propel BRC at that time include but are not limited to; Chuck Mosely (lead singer, Faith no More,1983-1988), Angelo Moore (lead singer, Fishbone), Corey Glover (lead singer, Living Colour), Bevis M. Griffin (frontman, Banzai Kik). Many of these members were key players in the formation centered on the band Living Colour to start with. The Black Rock Coalition was created to band black rockers together in the music world because of racial discrimination in the music industry. At the time of formation of the BRC, society was racially stratified in that structural differences remained even though musical aesthetics spread beyond original borders. There existed racialized associations that defined and categorized mankind. In other words, stereotypes depicted which music was coded as black or white, making claims of who had the right to produce a certain genre. African American musicians were experiencing a categorical struggle, as stereotypes were pervasive in the music industry. Behind the stereotypes, there was a notion produced by culture and mass media that “it was just easier to market conventional R&B to black kids, and conventional rock and roll to white kids.” Consumers were ignorant to the fact that black musicians were capable of producing certain genres of music, such as rock ‘n’ roll, due to lack of exposure provided by mass media. Further, the idea that black people even wanted to play rock 'n' roll was implausible to many record executives and music consumers who held opinions as to what constituted authentic black music. With black musicians wanting their sound to be heard and recognized, they began fighting racial stereotypes. One way these artists began pushing past the barriers was through marketing their albums by strategically designing album covers. In the 1980s and 1990s, some Black rock bands such as Living Colour and Fishbone had illustrations rather than photos as their album covers. LaRonda Davis, the executive of the Black Rock Coalition, explained this was a marketing tactic used to avoid any confusion that the consumer may have off their judgment of the album cover. "If you saw a Black person on the cover, the assumption was that the music was R&B or hip-hop. It was about the look of the person on the cover as opposed to the sound inside, which created more work for the marketers."

The BRC began to combat racial stereotypes through accepting the “total spectrum” of black music. During this time, society essentially assigned certain genres of music to white people, and other genres black people. Furthermore, society decided "what constitutes 'real' rock ‘n’ roll music, including who is authorized to play that music and who is authorized to listen to and talk about it." Because of this discrimination, along with the lasting effects of the Jim Crow laws, black musicians were limited in all aspects of their industry - the types of music they could play, where they could record, and where they could perform their music. Therefore, the Black Rock Coalition came together to band against racism in the music business. In order to do this, the group followed through on their manifesto - to find recording and performance spaces for black musicians to give them equal opportunities for success.

== BRC's stance on origins of rock music ==
The Black Rock Coalition was formed in order to reaffirm that white rock had evolved from black origins, to combat racial stereotyping in music, and also to work to re-establish rock forms as functionally black music and as further proof of black music's power to make innovative leaps. By the 1960s, popular culture dictated that soul music was “black” and rock was “white,” despite the fact that black artists had created the rock genre. In order to fight against these stereotypes and promote racial equality, the BRC supports and advocates performances by black musicians of musical styles publicly associated with whiteness – hard rock, heavy metal and thrash.

Another one of the BRC's main goals was to re-establish Rock forms as black music. Because rock was commonly considered white music as many of the musical forms and styles associated with rock are considered white music. However, this is not the case in fact most of the musical elements associated with rock were invented by black musicians. Because rock has origins in blues, R&B, and gospel and in the 60's many rock artists were highly influenced by blues artists, rock music has many of the same elements as blues and gospel. For example, the 12-bar blues structure is prominent in rock songs. Also the use of bending guitar strings and bottleneck slides became a staple of rock music, although these styles were created by blues artist years earlier. Furthermore, other rock music forms not necessarily based in blues were also created by black rock artists. Other elements of rock such as many rock guitar sounds were developed by black rock artists such as Chuck Berry, Jimi Hendrix, and others. The rock guitar sounds and rhythms that define rock music were developed by artists like Chuck Berry, Muddy Waters, and Sister Rosetta Tharpe. For example, Muddy Waters was one of the first musicians to amplify a guitar, which is one of the defining features of rock music: “Muddy Waters caused a storm by playing through an amplifier, the sort of thing associated with rock n’ roll.” The BRC seeks to reclaim these innovations that have come to be considered as white music.

One of the first rock ‘n’ roll songs to ever be recorded was titled "Sh-boom" by the Chords, an all black male R&B group in 1954. The increase in popularity struck influence of covers by both black and white musicians, and unfortunately the new cover made by the Canadian group greatly surpassed the popularity of the original recording. Although there was an increased interest that brought in white audiences to the musical genre due to its new exotic sound, the white audience revealed that they felt more comfortable with the Canadian made cover during the beginning of the racial integration stages in music.

As a part of their mission, the Black Rock Coalition strives to embrace every aspect of black music, regardless of the genre being performed. The coalition itself works to document the culture and history of black music so it will be appreciated for what it is and the origins of a genre will not be lost. From the time of its creation, the Black Rock Coalition has been famous for hosting historical parties and exhibits, many of which follow along the guidelines that “Rock is black music. Rock is everyone's music, but the origins of rock are Black... And there's no way you can get around that”.

== Support for black artists ==
Among other activities, the BRC actively seeks performance venues, recording opportunities, and equitable distribution opportunities for black artists. They work to archive performance footage of cultural events related to their oeuvre, and to provide or publicize various educational opportunities (e.g. lectures, workshops, seminars, research, library and audio-visual resources, public forums/discussions, etc.). BRC also solicits funding for projects and provides networking opportunities. BRC and their volunteer base is a resource to their community of members and other organizations such as the Willie Mae Rock Camp for Girls. In 2015 the BRC celebrated their 30th anniversary throughout the month of September with "30 Years in 30 Days" that encompassed events to showcase their support. Events in Brooklyn, New York and neighboring locations ranged from a fund raiser for BRC's Original Rocker Scholarships, a vocal clinic at the Metrosonic Showroom, rehearsal space at the Funkadelic Studios for members and friends, performances by BRC's Orchestra playing tribute to Jimi Hendrix's live album Band of Gypsys at the BAMCafé, and various social events. They also hosted "Million Man Mosh 3" at The Wind Up Space featuring artists such as Tamar-kali, Thaylo Bleu, and Throwdown Syndicate. Some of the live recordings taken at the events will be included onto BRC's 8th Rock’n’Roll Reparations compilation album that highlights "songs that bring to light some of the issues that affect people and musicians of color" says BRC's executive LaRonda Davis. Additionally, the BRC documents events and concerts performed by black rock groups, and puts on educational "workshops, seminars, research, library resources, audio-visual resources and public forums/discussions" to expose the public to black rock music and the true origins of rock music. Without this contribution, it is likely that many black artists would have received a lack of publicity and opportunity in the music industry because of persisting racial stereotypes. The goal of the BRC was to "push for an end to 'musical apartheid,'.

== Trans-racial audiences ==
BRC addresses a phenomenon about the crossover of black musicians to white audiences. Two different positions were expressed on the crossover of black musicians to white audiences. Steve Perry (musician) saw the phenomenon of black artists topping the “Hot 100” as positive for its integration and implications for cross-racial harmony. Nelson George (music critic) saw this as a dilution of black social and cultural power, arguing that black artist who aimed at the mainstream were forsaking the black musical tradition. Living Color was one of the bands that were closely connected to the BRC and it played a significant role in the impact of the crossover of black music to white audiences. In the band's song “Which Way to America”, the effects of the crossover are reflected through the lyrics even though the two different lives depicted were not racially defined explicitly. The song also includes notions of problems within politics and economics that were derived from the crossover: “don't want to crossover / but how do I keep from going under?” The lyrics signify the desire to live a traditional American life that is portrayed in the media, but their realistic America is far from that.

== Structure ==
The BRC is governed by an executive board and an advisory board; board members have included Me'shell Ndegeocello, Bernie Worrell, 24-7 Spyz, the members of Living Colour, Bill Stephney, Craig Street, Sekou Sundiata, Chocolate Genius, Don Byron and Nona Hendryx. Artists who have participated in BRC activities include Doug Pinnick (frontman and bassist for the progressive metal band King's X), Spacey T, Keziah Jones, Tamar-kali, Suffrajett, Graph Nobel, Imani Coppola, David Ryan Harris, Jeffrey Gaines, Sophia Ramos, FunkFace, Pillow Theory, Apollo Heights, Avery Brooks, The Family Stand, Carl Hancock Rux, Caron Wheeler, and DJ Reborn.

BRC had an active radio show in the 1980s. As of 2020 it maintains a website as well as an email list and a regular mailing list, an Internet radio station (BRC Radio @ Soul-Patrol.Net), and a Twitter page.

== See also ==
- Mahon, Maureen. Right to Rock: The Black Rock Coalition and the Cultural Politics of Race. Durham, NC: Duke University Press, 2004. Review
- NAACP
- Afro-punk
- Black rock music
- Progressive soul
