= Jim Turner (center) =

American football player (1912–1995)

No. 26, 23, 13, 87
- Position: Center

Personal information
- Born: January 14, 1910; Roff, Oklahoma, U.S.
- Died: June 22, 1995 (aged 85); Louisville, Kentucky, U.S.
- Listed height: 6 ft 2 in (1.88 m)
- Listed weight: 210 lb (95 kg)

Career information
- High school: Wichita Falls (Wichita Falls, Texas)
- College: Oklahoma A&M (1929–1932)

Career history
- Tulsa Oilers (1934); Pittsburgh Americans (1936); Cleveland Rams (1937); Philadelphia Eagles (1938)*; Louisville Tanks (1938–1939)
- * Offseason or practice squad member only
- Stats at Pro Football Reference

James Kay Turner (January 14, 1910 – June 22, 1995) was an American professional football center who played one season with the Cleveland Rams of the National Football League (NFL). He played college football at Oklahoma Agricultural and Mechanical College.

== Early life and college ==
James Kay Turner was born on January 14, 1910, in Roff, Oklahoma. He attended Wichita Falls High School in Wichita Falls, Texas.

Turner was a member of the Oklahoma A&M Cowboys of the Oklahoma Agricultural and Mechanical College from 1929 to 1932 and a three-year letterman from 1930 to 1932.

== Professional career ==
Turner played in seven games, all starts, for the Tulsa Oilers of the American Football League in 1934.

He appeared in six games, all starts, for the Pittsburgh Americans of the American Football League in 1936.

Turner signed with the Cleveland Rams of the National Football League in 1937. He played in seven games, starting two, for the Rams during the team's inaugural 1937 season.

He was signed by the Philadelphia Eagles in 1938 but was later released.

Turner played in six games, starting four, for the Louisville Tanks of the American Professional Football League in 1938. He appeared in four games for the Tanks during the 1939 season.

== Personal life ==
Turner died on June 22, 1995, in Louisville, Kentucky.
