= Khari Long =

American gridiron football player (born 1982)

No. 98, 95
- Position: Defensive end

Personal information
- Born: May 23, 1982 (age 44); Wichita Falls, Texas, U.S.
- Listed height: 6 ft 4 in (1.93 m)
- Listed weight: 257 lb (117 kg)

Career information
- High school: S. H. Rider (Wichita Falls)
- College: Baylor
- NFL draft: 2005: 6th round, 199th overall pick

Career history
- Kansas City Chiefs (2005); Chicago Bears (2005–2006); Dallas Cowboys (2007)*; Buffalo Bills (2007)*; Dallas Cowboys (2008)*; Hamilton Tiger-Cats (2009–2010); Calgary Stampeders (2010); Omaha Nighthawks (2011)
- * Offseason or practice squad member only
- Stats at Pro Football Reference
- Stats at CFL.ca (archive)

Khari Ahmad Long (born May 23, 1982) is an American former professional football defensive end. He was selected by the Kansas City Chiefs in the sixth round of the 2005 NFL draft. Long was also a member of the Chicago Bears, Dallas Cowboys, Buffalo Bills, Hamilton Tiger-Cats, Calgary Stampeders, and Omaha Nighthawks. He played college football at Baylor.

== Early life ==
Long attended Rider High School in Wichita Falls, Texas, lettering in football and basketball. As a junior, he registered 122 tackles and 7 sacks. He was limited in his senior season with a sprained ankle.

== College career ==
Long accepted a football scholarship from Baylor University. As a junior, he appeared in 11 games (4 starts) at defensive end and defensive tackle, registering 41 tackles, 4.5 sacks, 3 quarterback pressures and one pass defensed. As a senior, he appeared in 10 games (8 starts) at left defensive end, posting 31 tackles, 1.5 sacks, 3 quarterback pressures and one pass defensed.

He played in 39 college games (22 starts), finishing with 145 tackles, 19.5 tackles for loss, 9 sacks, two forced fumbles, four passes defensed and 14 quarterback pressures.

== Professional career ==
Long was selected by the Kansas City Chiefs in the sixth round (199th overall) of the 2005 NFL draft. He was limited with a back injury but still made the team. On November 24, he was released and signed to the practice squad.

On January 10, 2006, he was signed by the Chicago Bears to the practice squad. On August 21, he was placed on the injured reserve list with an injured shoulder. He was released on April 19, 2007.

On August 3, 2007, he was signed as a free agent by the Dallas Cowboys. On September 1, he was released and signed to the practice squad 2 days later. He was released on December 18.

On December 20, 2007, he was signed by the Buffalo Bills to their practice squad.

On January 16, 2008, he was re-signed by the Cowboys. He was released on July 28.

Long signed with the Omaha Nighthawks on August 25, 2011.
