= Wichita Falls High School =

Location
- 2149 Avenue H and Coyote Blvd. Wichita Falls, Wichita, Texas 76309; United States; 33°53′38″N 98°31′01″W

Information
- School type: Public, Secondary
- Motto: Pride, Tradition, Honor, Excellence
- Established: 1891
- Closed: May 24, 2024; 2 years ago
- School district: Wichita Falls Independent School District
- Staff: 74.15 (FTE)
- Grades: 9–12
- Enrollment: 1,309 (2022–2023)
- Student to teacher ratio: 17.65
- Colors: Red and Black
- Athletics: Football, Basketball, Volleyball, Powerlifting, Track, Cross Country, Soccer, Tennis, Swimming, Baseball, Softball, and Golf
- Mascot: Coyote
- Rivals: S. H. Rider High School
- Newspaper: The Coyote News

Wichita Falls High School (WFHS) was a public school in Wichita Falls, Texas, United States. It is part of the Wichita Falls Independent School District (WFISD) and was one of the district's three high schools up until 2024. Located at 2149 Avenue H and Coyote Blvd., the school served students in grades nine through twelve.

== History ==
As the first high school in the city, Wichita Falls High School was locally known as "Old High." The school was founded in 1891, with a new building built on Broad Street in 1909. In 1924 the school moved to new building on Avenue H, and the old building became Reagan Junior High. The 1909 building now serves as the WFISD Administration Building, and is a state historic landmark.

WFISD completed construction of two new high schools – Legacy and Memorial – which opened for classes in August 2024. Wichita Falls High shut its doors permanently at the end of the 2023-2024 school year, with students moving to one of the two new high schools. The campus will sit vacant until a potential school bond election in 2027 is proposed to convert it into a middle school.

== Student demographics ==
As of the 2013–2014 school year, Wichita Falls High School had a total of 1,473 students (47.41% White, 35.2% Hispanic, 15.6% African American, 1.8% Asian, and 0.3% Native American).

== 2011–2012 accountability rating ==
Based on the accountability ratings released by the Texas Education Agency on August 1, 2012, Wichita Falls High School is currently rated "Academically Acceptable".

The WFISD also awarded Wichita Falls High School with an award for the district's highest GPA, every year from 1991 to 2002. The award was discontinued in 2002.

== Athletics ==
Whether at home or away, during the glory years the Wichita Falls team was always a handful for its opponents.

— Ty Cashion

Wichita Falls had one of the most predominant football programs for more than 30 years, from the late 1930s to the early 1970s. Under the guidance of head coaches Ted Jeffries (1931–43), Thurman Jones (1944–46), Joe Golding (1947–61), and Donnell Crosslin (1965–79), the Wichita Falls Coyotes made the state finals ten times between 1937 and 1971, winning six times.

- Football State Champions
  - 1941 (2A), 1949 (2A), 1950 (2A), 1958 (4A), 1961 (4A), 1969 (4A)
- Football State Runner Up
  - 1937 (1A), 1959 (4A), 1960 (4A), 1971 (4A)

At the time of its closure, Wichita Falls High School had made playoffs 46 times, winning eight Quarterfinal Championships, seventeen Regional Championships, twenty-one Area Championships, twenty-three Bi-District Championships, and thirty-six District Championships since 1923.

In September 2007, Texas Monthly Magazine named Wichita Falls High School as the top high school football program in state history.

== Student journalism ==
Wichita Falls High School's journalism program publishes the school's newspaper and yearbook.

Mrs. Annetta Reusch managed the award-winning program for numerous years until her retirement in 2013. Mr. Jason Byas has since taken the reins of the organization as the faculty adviser.

In 2013, the organization was reevaluated and the two publications were restructured to publish under the entity WFHS Publishing. The move was meant to save cost for the newspaper and yearbook and improve communication throughout the program and the publications it publishes.

Since the restructuring, the newspaper, The Coyote News, for the first time in over five years, made a profit and the yearbook increased yearly sales.

The newspaper runs an online edition of the paper. WFHS Publishing has also published a history guide to Wichita Falls High School that is available on their website.

== Junior Reserve Officer Training Corps ==
The Wichita Falls High School Junior Reserve Officer Training Corps Army program was established in 1951. The battalion was officially recognized as the Coyote Battalion. While being established the Junior Reserve Officer Training Corp program competed statewide and nationally as well as hosting the annual "The Wichita" JROTC Drill meet during November every year. They had an average participation body of 130 cadets per year. The Battalion received the gold level presidential service award in 2019, and at the time of closing in 2024, were considered an honor unit with distinction (Yellow Star) by the U.S. Army JROTC.

== Rivalry ==
Wichita Falls High School participated in the rivalry against Rider High School (The Showdown in Falls Town) since the completion of Rider in 1961. Beginning the week of the infamous game, known as "War Week", the Wichita Falls Police Department reported an increase in vandalism, theft, and attacks from both sides.

In 2014, the rivalry was recognized by the Army Great American Rivalry Series as one of the greatest rivalries in the nation. The winner was presented with the Great American Rivalry Trophy at the conclusion of the game that year. The trophy went to the Wichita Falls Coyotes, as they defeated the Rider Raiders 50-36 in front of a packed Memorial Stadium, adding even more fuel to the rivalry. The final game between these 2 schools, in 2024, received a flyover from Sheppard Air Force Base, a fitting end to a historic Rivalry.

== Notable alumni ==
- Frank Kell Cahoon, Class of 1952, former member of the Texas House of Representatives from Midland
- Gabriel P. Disosway, Class of 1927, United States Air Force four-star general
- Johnny Genung, Class of 1959, former Texas Longhorns football player, and orthopedic surgeon
- Joe Golding, Class of 1998, college basketball coach at Abilene Christian University and University of Texas at El Paso
- Bevis M. Griffin, American drummer, businessman, and educator
- David Farabee, Class of 1982, member of the Texas House from Wichita Falls since 1999
- Ed Neal, former NFL player
- Bernard Scott, Class of 2003, former NFL player
- Jim Turner, former NFL player
- Ken Whitlow, former NFL player
- Thomas W. Fowler, Class of 1939, Medal of Honor Recipient for his actions in World War II

== See also ==
- Hirschi High School
- S. H. Rider High School
