= Marcus Foster (basketball) =

American basketball player (born 1995)

- Foster with PAOK Thessaloniki in 2026

No. 17 – PAOK Thessaloniki
- Position: Shooting guard
- League: Greek Basketball League; EuroCup

Personal information
- Born: June 3, 1995 (age 31) Wichita Falls, Texas, U.S.
- Listed height: 6 ft 3 in (1.91 m)
- Listed weight: 205 lb (93 kg)

Career information
- High school: Hirschi (Wichita Falls, Texas)
- College: Kansas State (2013–2015); Creighton (2016–2018)
- NBA draft: 2018: undrafted
- Playing career: 2018–present

Career history
- 2018–2019: Wonju DB Promy
- 2019: Champville SC
- 2019–2020: Hapoel Holon
- 2020–2021: Panathinaikos
- 2021: Türk Telekom
- 2021–2022: Rio Grande Valley Vipers
- 2022: Promitheas Patras
- 2022–2023: Rytas Vilnius
- 2023: Shandong Hi-Speed Kirin
- 2023–2024: Rytas Vilnius
- 2024–2025: Hapoel Tel Aviv
- 2025–2026: Alvark Tokyo
- 2026–present: PAOK Thessaloniki

Career highlights
- EuroCup champion (2025); FIBA Champions League Top Scorer (2023); All-FIBA Champions League Second Team (2023); Lithuanian League champion (2024); Lithuanian League Finals MVP (2024); All-Lithuanian League Team (2023); Israeli League Top Scorer (2020); NBA G League champion (2022); 2× First-team All-Big East (2017, 2018); Second-team All-Big 12 (2014); First-team Parade All-American (2013)
- Stats at NBA.com
- Stats at Basketball Reference

Marcus Franklee Foster (born June 3, 1995) is an American professional basketball player for PAOK Thessaloniki of the Greek Basketball League (GBL) and the EuroCup. He played college basketball for Kansas State University and Creighton University before playing professionally in South Korea, Lebanon, Israel, Turkey, Greece, and Lithuania.

== Early life and high school career ==
Foster is the son of Melvin and Alvita Foster. Foster has two older sisters. Growing up in Wichita Falls, Texas, Marcus Foster began playing basketball at a young age and developed a reputation as a gymrat. He competed for Hirschi High School and was a well-regarded recruit for Kansas State.

== College career ==
=== Kansas State ===
Foster was a surprise star at Kansas State, scoring 25 points in his second game in uniform. In a game against Texas in February, he contributed 34 points. Foster had 29 in a matchup versus Baylor in March. He was named Second Team All-Big 12 and led Kansas State to a nine seed in the NCAA Tournament. On the season, Foster averaged 15.5 points, 3.2 rebounds and 2.5 assists per game, and he shot 40 percent from behind the 3-point arc. He went to the LeBron James Skill Academy in the summer.

In his sophomore year, Foster was named to the Preseason First Team All-Big 12. However, Foster had a very disappointing season, which he blamed on focusing too much on the NBA. He gained weight and was suspended three games into the conference season. Foster's per game averages dropped to 12.5 points, 2.3 rebounds and 1.9 assists per game. Kansas State limped to a 15–17 record, and at the end of the season coach Bruce Weber dismissed him. Foster transferred to Creighton since he had developed a relationship with coach Greg McDermott.

=== Creighton ===
Per NCAA policy, Foster was forced to sit out a season. Coming into his redshirt junior season, Foster was named Preseason Big East Honorable Mention. He was the first player in 30 years to score 15 or more points in the first eight games of Creighton's season. On February 19, 2017, Foster scored a career-high 35 points in an 87–70 win against Georgetown. At the conclusion of the season, he garnered First Team All-Big East honors. He was named one of five finalists for the Jerry West Award. Foster scored 638 points as a junior, the highest for a Creighton newcomer, for an 18.2 points per game average, third highest in the Big East. After deliberating for a few days, he opted to return for his senior year.

On September 29, 2017, Foster's girlfriend Chelsea Ghasemi gave birth to their first child. Foster was named to the Preseason First Team All-Big East as a senior. He had a season-high 32 points in a 90–81 win versus UT Arlington on December 19. On February 7, 2018, Foster scored his 2,000th career point on a game-winning shot to defeat DePaul. In his final college game, a loss to Kansas State in the first round of the NCAA Tournament, he scored just five points but embraced Bruce Weber after the game. Foster averaged 19.8 points, 3.9 rebounds and 2.7 assists per game as a senior. Foster was named to the First Team All-Big East. After the season he was invited to the 2018 Portsmouth Invitational Tournament.

== Professional career ==
=== Wonju DB Promy (2018–2019) ===
After going undrafted in the 2018 NBA draft, he joined the Sacramento Kings for the 2018 NBA Summer League.

On August 2, 2018, Foster signed his professional contract with Wonju DB Promy of the Korean Basketball League (KBL). On October 17, 2018, Foster recorded a career-high 47 points, shooting 16-of-27 from the field, along with nine rebounds, six assists and three steals in a 117–116 win over the Changwon LG Sakers. In 51 games played for Wonju, he finished the season as the league fourth-leading scorer with 25.2 points, along with 5.2 rebounds and 3.7 assists per game.

=== Champville SC (2019) ===
On March 28, 2019, Foster signed with Champville SC of the Lebanese Basketball League for the rest of the season.

=== Hapoel Holon (2019–2020) ===
In June 2019, Foster joined the Orlando Magic for the 2019 NBA Summer League.

On July 31, 2019, Foster signed with Hapoel Holon of the Israeli Premier League and the Basketball Champions League (BCL) for the 2019–20 season. On October 11, 2019, Foster recorded 20 points in his debut, while shooting 7-of-12 from the field, along with six rebounds and four assists in a 103–86 win over Maccabi Ashdod. On November 9, 2019, Foster recorded a season-high 29 points, while shooting 6-of-9 from three-point range, leading Holon to a 92–73 win over Hapoel Be'er Sheva. In 34 games played for Hapoel (both in the Israeli League and the BCL), Foster averaged 19.2 points, 3.2 rebounds and 3.6 assists per game.

=== Panathinaikos (2020–2021) ===
On July 14, 2020, Foster signed a one-year deal with Panathinaikos of the Greek Basket League and the EuroLeague, with the option for an additional season. On February 18, 2021, he was released from the Greek club.

=== Türk Telekom (2021) ===
On February 18, 2021, Foster signed with Türk Telekom of the Turkish Basketball Super League.

=== Rio Grande Valley Vipers (2021–2022) ===
In October 2021, Foster signed with the Houston Rockets of the National Basketball Association (NBA) for training camp. He subsequently joined the Rio Grande Valley Vipers as an affiliate player.

=== Promitheas Patras (2022) ===
On May 19, 2022, Foster returned to Greece, signing with Promitheas Patras before the start of the Greek Basket League playoffs. In 10 games played, he averaged 12.5 points, 2.7 rebounds and 2 assists, playing around 24 minutes per contest.

=== Rytas Vilnius (2022–2023) ===
On August 2, 2022, Foster signed with Rytas Vilnius of the Lithuanian Basketball League (LKL) and the Basketball Champions League.

=== Shandong Hi-Speed Kirin (2023) ===
After season in Rytas Vilnius, Marcus signed for Shandong Hi-Speed Kirin competing in CBA. However, with mutual agreement Foster terminated his contract.

=== Return to Rytas Vilnius (2023–2024) ===
On December 27, 2023, Foster re-joined Rytas Vilnius.

=== Hapoel Tel Aviv (2024–2025) ===
On July 1, 2024, he signed with Hapoel Tel Aviv of the Israeli Basketball Premier League.

=== Alvark Tokyo (2025–2026) ===
On July 11, 2025, Foster signed with Alvark Tokyo of the B.League. During the 2025–26 season, he averaged 15.8 points, 3.0 rebounds and 3.2 assists in 59 games.

=== PAOK Thessaloniki (2026–present) ===
On June 4, 2026, Foster signed a two-year contract with PAOK Thessaloniki, joining the club ahead of the 2026–27 season under head coach Andrea Trinchieri. The move marked his third stint in Greece, following previous spells with Panathinaikos and Promitheas Patras.

Foster was already familiar to PAOK supporters from the club's 2022–23 Basketball Champions League Play-In series against Rytas Vilnius. In the game at the PAOK Sports Arena on January 11, 2023, he scored 31 points, while he again led Rytas in scoring in the deciding third game as the Lithuanian club advanced to the next round.

At the time of his signing, Foster was coming off a season in Japan and had won the 2024–25 EuroCup with Hapoel Tel Aviv the previous year. Earlier in his career, he had also been the Basketball Champions League's leading scorer in 2022–23 and the Lithuanian League Finals MVP in 2024. In his first interview following the move, Foster stated that the opportunity to work with Trinchieri and become part of PAOK's new project was an important factor in his decision to join the club.
