= S. H. Rider High School =

Location
- 4611 Cypress Avenue; Wichita Falls, Wichita, Texas 76310; United States; 33°51′44″N 98°34′10″W

Information
- School type: Public secondary
- Motto: One Family, One Team
- Established: 1961
- Closed: May 24, 2024; 2 years ago
- School district: Wichita Falls Independent School District
- Staff: 102.79 (FTE)
- Grades: 9–12
- Enrollment: 1,520 (2018–19)
- Student to teacher ratio: 14.79
- Colors: Black and gold
- Nickname: Raiders
- Rivals: Wichita Falls High School

S.H. Rider High School was a public school in Wichita Falls, Texas, United States. It was part of the Wichita Falls Independent School District. The school opened in 1961 and served students in grades nine through twelve, until its closure in May 2024.

== History ==
The school opened for classes in the fall of 1961. It was named for Stephen H. Rider, a long-time educator in the Wichita Falls Independent School District. He was principal of Wichita Falls High School from 1919 to 1949.

Although Rider did not open until seven years after the U.S. Supreme Court's Brown v. Board of Education decision, none of Wichita Falls's high schools integrated their classes until the late 1960s.

Rider shut its doors permanently at the end of the 2023–2024 school year, with two new high schools, Legacy High and Memorial High, near completion. Students were transferred to one of the new high schools depending on which zone they lived in. The campus will sit vacant until a potential school bond election in 2027 is proposed to convert it into a middle school.

== Demographics ==
In the 2016–2017 academic year, 59.3% of Rider's graduates were white, 22.3% were Hispanic, 9.8% were African American, 4.3% were Asian, 1.6% were American Indian, 0.3% were Pacific Islander, and 2.4% were multiracial.

== Academics ==
During the 2016–2017 school year, 8.2% of Rider students were in the school's gifted and talented education program. Another 10.4% of Rider students were in the school's special education program.

In 2016, the Texas Education Agency (TEA) gave Rider an academic accountability rating of "Met standard". In 2018, the TEA began grading schools in five key areas of performance. In 2017, four "preliminary" grades were given to Rider: a B, two Cs, and a D.

== Sports ==
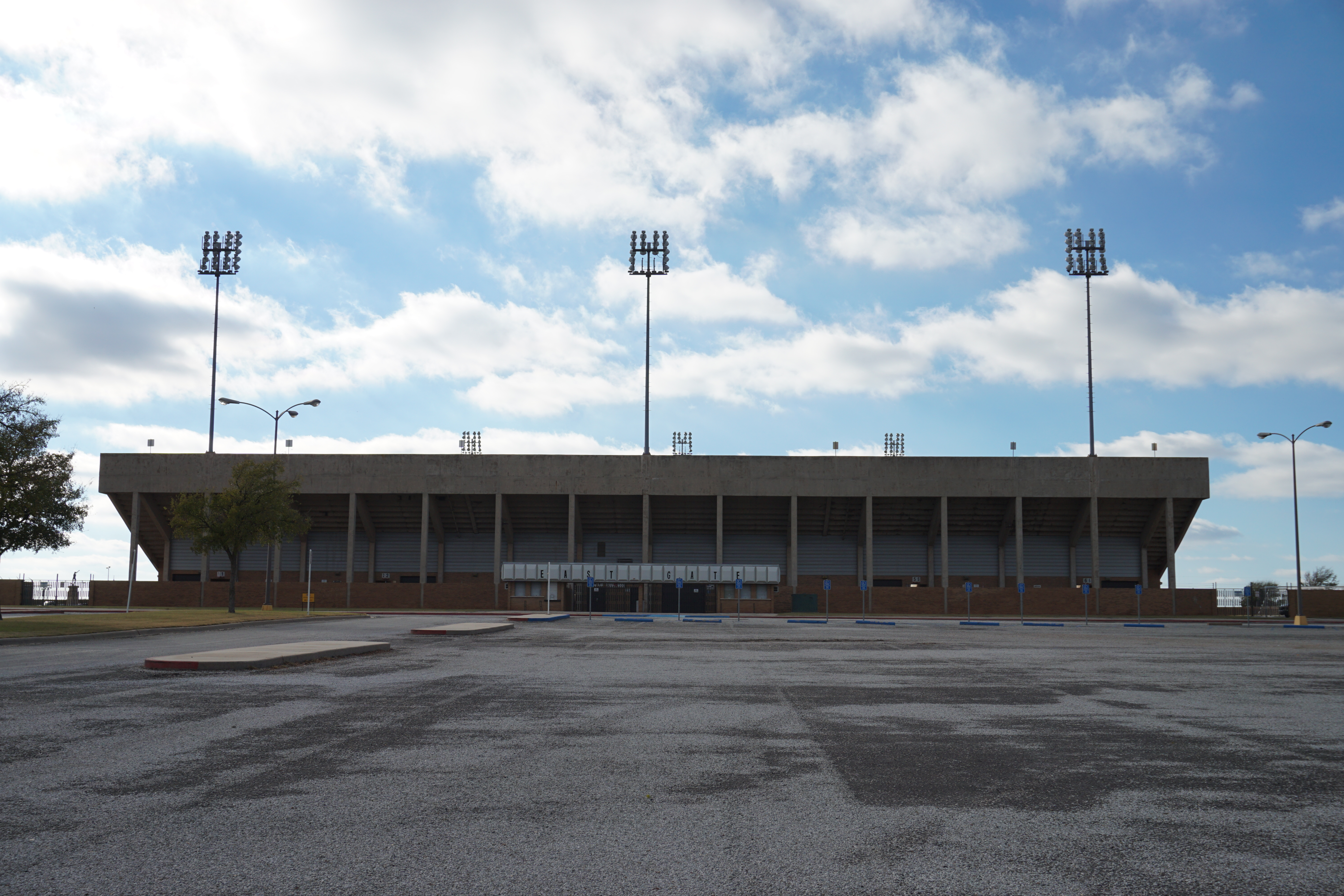
Memorial Stadium is home to the Rider Raiders and other district high school teams.

In 1970, Wichita Falls Independent School District built Memorial Stadium, the first high school stadium in Texas with AstroTurf. Seating capacity is over 14,500.

== Notable alumni ==
- Chase Anderson, MLB pitcher
- J. T. Barrett, NFL coach and former NFL player
- Ryan Brasier, MLB pitcher
- Taliyah Brooks, professional track & field athlete
- Joe Cutbirth, journalist and educator
- James Frank, member of the Texas House of Representatives from District 69 in Wichita Falls
- Ty Harrelson, NBA guard and college coach
- Khari Long, former professional football player (NFL, CLF, UFL)
- Markelle Martin, former NFL football player
- David Nelson, former NFL football player
- Dean Prater, former NFL football player
- Steve Railsback, actor
- Jaret Reddick, lead singer, guitarist for Bowling For Soup
- Jacob Rodriguez, professional football linebacker for the Miami Dolphins
- Mark Satin, anti-Vietnam War activist, political theorist, and author
- Aaron Taylor, former NFL player
- Eric Ward, former NFL player
- Ronnie Williams, former NFL player
