= Bevis M. Griffin =

American drummer

Bevis Griffin
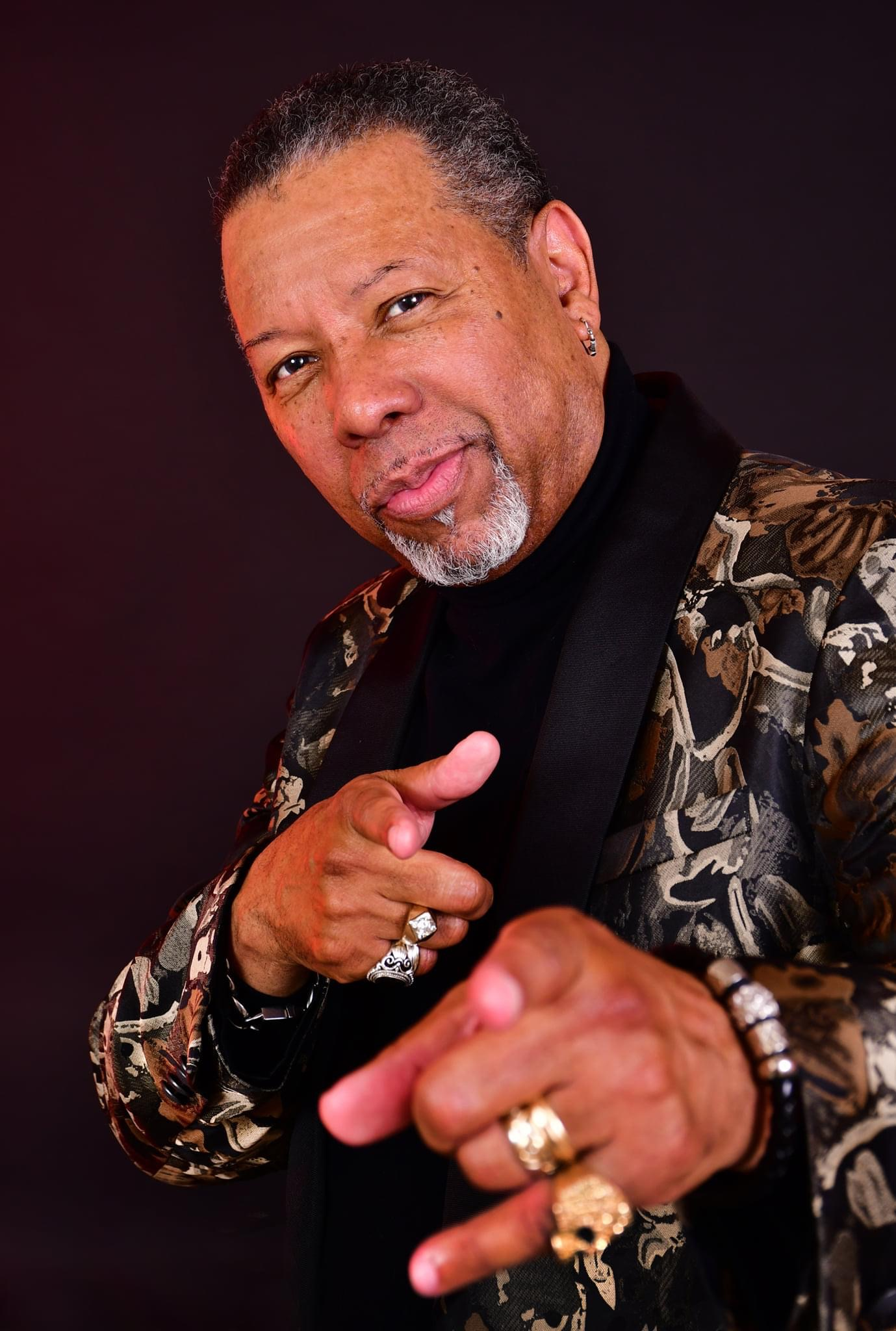
- Bevis Melvin Griffin

Background information
- Born: Bevis Melvin Griffin; April 26, 1953 (age 73); Los Angeles, California
- Genres: Glam rock; punk rock; hard rock; funk rock; blues
- Occupations: Musician; songwriter; producer; drummer; CEO; creative consultant; artist manager
- Instruments: Drums; vocals
- Years active: 1971–present
- Website: www.bevismgriffin.com

Bevis Melvin Griffin (born April 26, 1953) is an American musician, businessman, and educator. In 1998, Griffin was honored by the City of Austin as a musician of cultural significance and awarded a mayoral proclamation by Mayor Kirk Watson for 25 years of musical contributions as one of the earliest pioneers of Texas glam rock, punk rock, and hard rock.

Griffin made his public music performance debut in 1971 and has since been recognized by many as an influential genre-defining artist. Living Colour guitarist Vernon Reid described Griffin as "a veritable missing link in a transitional period in American popular music." Music critic Greg Tate wrote that "in retrospect, [Griffin's style] may have been the most provocative challenge to the hierarchy and status quo of rock imaging at the time."

He is the founder and executive director of Deux Voix Ltd., LLC, an Austin-based artist development enterprise, working with afro-centric bands and artists such as Death, Francis M’Bappe, Living Colour, and Andre Cymone.

Over the course of 40 years, Griffin was a part of many prominent Texas bands: Franklin's Mast, Fools, the Skyscrapers, the Shades, the Bats, Banzai Kik, Chill Factor, Rawhead TechX, Spy vs. Spy, Solid Senders, the Cosmopolitans, Dino Lee's Luv Johnson, One Fell Swoop, Papa Mali & the Instagators, R.C. Banks, the Paradigm, and Bevis & the Painkillers.

== Early life ==
Griffin was born in Los Angeles, California, in 1953. His father, Melvin Griffin, owned a barbershop that was frequented by famous musicians such as Bobby Bland, Ike Turner, and Johnny Otis, who performed at the nearby Five-Four Ballroom.

He spent his adolescent years in Wichita Falls, Texas, where he practiced the drums every night throughout high school. During his time there, Wichita Falls High School was a newly integrated establishment.

== Career ==
Griffin is recognized as one of the earliest prominent Black contributors to the Austin music scene.

In high school, Griffin met his first major collaborator, musician Jimmy Lee Saurage. In 1971, they formed the hard-rock trio Franklin's Mast with bassist Barry Minnick in Austin, Texas. During their tenure, the band played opening shows for notable Texas groups including ZZ Top and Trapeze.

While Franklin's Mast toured Texas, Oklahoma, Arkansas, and Kansas, Griffin was one of the few prominent Black Austin-based musicians. According to Living Colour guitarist Vernon Reid, Griffin was "integral to the dawn of Austin's modern ascendency into the ranks of the world's great music cities, back when the Armadillo World Headquarters had barely opened its doors, and the Vaughan Brothers were being whispered about."

In 1978, Griffin joined Saurage, songwriter Christopher K. Bailey, and bassist Byron Davies to form the Skyscrapers. They frequently performed at Austin nightclubs such as the Continental Club on Congress Avenue. These performances upped their profile, leading them to open for the Ramones in a sold-out show at the Armadillo World Headquarters in 1979.

After the success of the Skyscrapers, Griffin emerged as a frontman for the Bats (later renamed Banzai Kik), a band he formed with Bailey, bassist Courtney Audain, and drummer Billy Blackmon in 1980. In 1981, they recorded a 10-song demo with British producer John Rollo at Indian Creek Studios in Uvalde, Texas. After a few more years headlining local clubs with Banzai Kik, Griffin moved to New York City to pursue recording opportunities in 1983.

In the late 1980s, Griffin became a founding member of the Black Rock Coalition, a New York-based artists collective and nonprofit organization dedicated to promoting the creative freedom and works of Black musicians. Griffin was a member of the Black Rock Coalition Orchestra, a 28-piece ensemble that received national coverage in publications including Rolling Stone.

In 1986, Griffin performed in the debut show of the Black Rock Coalition Orchestra in Brooklyn's Prospect Park. Griffin later performed with the Black Rock Coalition Orchestra and Banzai Kik at the Stalking Heads of ’87, a two-day rock festival held at the CBGB music club.

In 1987, Griffin signed a two-year management agreement with Bad Brains manager Anthony Countey and production company Shake the Earth. In 1987, producer Jack Douglas offered to record and sign Griffin and Banzai Kik to a new record label called Supertrack in partnership with EMI Records. Douglas, who had previously worked with John Lennon and Aerosmith, was said to have been impressed with Griffin's songwriting and vocal talent. Banzai Kik played a preliminary session at Chung-King House of Metal and was set to continue recording at other notable New York studios. Banzai Kik recorded the first six songs of the deal at the Record Plant. Griffin temporarily left New York after his father died from gun violence. When he returned, he learned that there was a protracted legal dispute between his management and Douglas’ production company. The deal eventually collapsed.

Griffin continued to perform for many years after the Douglas deal. He left New York for Los Angeles before returning to Austin and forming the Chill Factor with guitarist Denny Freeman in 1988. Griffin continued to perform with various other bands until 2010.

== Cultural impact and later career ==
=== Impact and style ===
Griffin is considered by many as an often overlooked pioneer of Black rock music. He has been regarded as both "the Black Rock Maverick of Texas" and a "champion of alternative Black culture."

As a performer, Griffin was known for his androgynous and theatrical style. He took major inspiration from performers such as Jimi Hendrix, David Bowie, Sly Stone, and the New York Dolls. Music critic Tim Stegall writes that Griffin would reportedly carry nunchuks while touring as a means of self-defense against those who took issue with his flamboyant manner of dress. With the Bats, Griffin's performances have been noted for their commentary on racial anxieties and sexual ambiguities in Texas.

In the late 1980s, Griffin became a founding member of the Black Rock Coalition, a New York-based artists collective and nonprofit organization dedicated to promoting the creative freedom and works of Black musicians.

In 1998, Griffin was honored by the City of Austin as a musician of cultural significance and awarded a mayoral proclamation by Mayor Kirk Watson for 25 years of musical contributions as one of the earliest pioneers of Texas hard rock, punk rock, and glam rock.

In the early 2020s, Griffin was the featured artist on 40th Anniversary Edition of the magazine for the Texas Music Museum, an organization that collects and preserves artifacts, documents and reference material surrounding the diverse traditions of Texas music. He was also the cover and feature story of Volume 23 of Journal of Texas Music History.

=== Executive and educator ===
After playing his last live performance in 2010, Griffin pivoted to the administrative side of the industry.

As of 2021, Griffin oversees three development entities: Deux Voix Ltd., LLC, an artist development and management consultant firm; Deux Voix Apex Solutions LLC, a Black music history education firm; and Deux Voix Apex Creative LLC, which focuses on film and TV production. The education initiatives of Deux Voix Apex Solutions LLC have been well regarded by Black American musician community members. As of 2023, the musical curriculum created by Griffin is utilized in School of Rock franchises. It focuses on providing students with a firm grasp of popular music history to expand their personal palette and understanding.

Griffin has managed and/or consulted notable bands and artists such as Death, Living Colour, Prince alumnus Andre Cymone, Norwood Fisher of Fishbone, Francis M’Bappe, Freekbass, and Kelvyn Bell.

=== Personal life ===
In 2024, Griffin became a Recovery Support Peer Specialist through the Texas Certification Board, granting certification to assist those with "chemical dependency, mental health, and/or co-occurring disorders."

== Selected discography ==
With The Shades (4 Song Vinyl EP)

- Laurie Two-Tone (Nuhuevo Records, 1979)

With Diamond Joe Siddons

- Little Red Riding Hood (Rude Records, 1980)

With Dino Lee & The Love Johnson

- To Serve Man (Technophilia, 1993)

With Bevis Griffin's One Fell Swoop

- Words (Just Get in My Way) (Zahmbee-Karlt, 1995)
- Cloudland (Zahmbee-Karlt, 1995)

With Bevis Griffin's Rawhead TechX

- Thunderdome (Zahmbee-Karlt, 1996)

With Papa Mali & The Instagators

- Thunder Chicken (Fog City Records, 2000)

With RC Banks

- Conway's Corner (Loudhouse Records 2001)
