= Wichita Falls Independent School District =

School district in Texas, United States

Address
- 1104 Broad Street Wichita Falls, TX, USA ESC Region 9
- Coordinates: 33°54′15″N 98°29′58″W

District information
- Type: Independent School District
- Motto: Equipped Learners. Endless Possibilities.
- Grades: PK–12
- Established: 1908; 118 years ago
- Superintendent: Dr. Donny Lee
- Governing agency: Texas Education Agency
- Schools: 24
- NCES District ID: 4845780

Students and staff
- Students: 12,452 (2025–2026)

Other information
- Website: www.wfisd.net

Wichita Falls Independent School District (Wichita Falls ISD or WFISD) is a public school district based in Wichita Falls, Texas, United States. Covering 82 square miles in Wichita County, the district serves most of Wichita Falls (including portions of Sheppard Air Force Base).

As of 2026, Wichita Falls ISD operates 24 campuses, including two high schools, three middle schools, 16 elementary schools, and three alternative schools. The district most recently received a "C" rating from the Texas Education Agency (TEA).

== History ==
The first high school in Wichita Falls was built in 1890, and the first graduating class was 1892. In 1908 the Texas Legislature issued a special charter for the Wichita Falls Independent School District. A new high school opened in 1910, and the original 1890 high school was converted into an elementary school.

The A.E. Holland school, constructed in 1921, wasn't originally known as Holland. It was named Barwise in honor of Wichita Falls pioneer J.H. Barwise. Because of segregation, white students attended Barwise, while black students went to school at Booker T. Washington. The Brown v. Board of Education Supreme Court decision in 1954 ruled against school segregation, but like a lot of districts in the south, it took Wichita Falls many years to catch up to that decision.

Rider High opened in 1961, followed the next year by Hirschi High.

The construction of two new high schools - Legacy and Memorial - were both on schedule and on budget as of January 2023, and are scheduled to open for classes in Fall 2024. The opening of these two new schools means the three existing high schools – Wichita Falls, Rider, and Hirschi – closed at the end of the 2023-2024 school year. Hirschi reopened as a middle school, replacing Kirby, in 2024. Rider reopened as a middle school, replacing McNiel, in 2025. McNiel will reopen in 2026 as an elementary school.

The Wichita Falls ISD was one of the few Texas school districts to offer a choice program that gives parents the choice of what secondary school they would like their child to attend. Wichita Falls ISD ended the choice program for all schools beginning with the 2015-2016 year.

Secondary schools in the WFISD offer Advanced Placement and International Baccalaureate courses to students wishing to pursue a more challenging academic curriculum. The WFISD currently operates two schools with the International Baccalaureate program, covering two segments of the program:

- G.H. Kirby Math/ Science Junior High and Hirschi High School partner in offering the Middle Years Programme
- Hirschi High School, an IB World School, offers the IB Diploma Programme to juniors and seniors

The school district has continuously been recognized for its overall academic success from the Texas Education Agency and the Magnet Schools of America Association. In 1999 and 2001 respectively, Washington/ Jackson Math/Science Center and G.H. Kirby Junior High were awarded the Ronald P. Simpson award, giving them the title of "Best Magnet School in America" for a year. The district also boasts that many of its schools have received the Texas Blue Ribbon award or have attained "Exemplary" status from the TEA.

In 2005, Hirschi High School IB World Topics teacher Sherry Lindemann was named Texas Secondary Teacher of the Year, and selected as a nominee for National Teacher of the Year. Ms. Lindemann represented the WFISD and thousands of Texas teachers at a formal ceremony held by President George W. Bush and First Lady Laura Bush in the White House Rose Garden.

== General information ==
=== School board ===
The Wichita Falls ISD is overseen by a Superintendent (Dr. Donny Lee), an Assistant Superintendent (Scot Hafley), and a seven-member Board of Trustees who are elected either as at-large or district members. President of the Board of Trustees is currently Mark Lukert.

=== Enrollment ===
There are approximately 13,309 students in grades K-12 as of October 2022.

=== WFISD staff ===
1,925 total staff members
1,019 teachers
667 auxiliary/paraprofessional staff members.
(Wichita Falls ISD is the second largest industry in Wichita Falls behind Sheppard Air Force Base)

=== Teacher experience ===
Average Years Experience - 12.9 years
Average Years Experience with WFISD - 10.8 years
31.9% of WFISD Teachers Have 11-20 Years Experience

=== Budget ===
2005-2006 $-88,026,794 (includes debt service, maintenance & operations, campus activity funds, special revenue funds)
Tax rate per $100 valuation: $1.142399

=== Facilities ===
20 Elementary Schools
1 Early Childhood Center
3 Junior High Schools grades 7-8
3 High Schools grades 9-12
1 Career & Applied Technology Center
1 Accelerated Learning Center
1 Student Adjustment Center
1 Sports Complex - Memorial Stadium (Wichita Falls)
1 Administration Center
1 Support Center

== Schools ==
=== Secondary schools ===
Secondary schools
Name	Grades	Established	Mascot	Colors	Additional information
Wichita Falls Legacy High School	9-12	2024	Leopards	Blue & Gold	
Wichita Falls Memorial High School	9-12	2024	Mavericks	Blue & Red	
Barwise Middle School	6-8	1921	Eagles	Green & Gold	
Hirschi Middle School	6-8	1962	Huskies	Columbia Blue & Red	Currently a charter school operated by Third Future Schools
Rider Middle School	6-8	1961	Raiders	Black & Vegas Gold	

=== Primary Schools ===
Primary Schools
Name	Grades	Established	Mascot	Colors	Additional information
Kate Burgess Elementary School	PK-5		Beagles	Red & Gray	
Crockett Elementary School	K-5	1925	Coyotes	Red & Yellow	
Cunningham Elementary School	PK-5		Cougars	Maroon & Gray	
Fain Elementary School	PK-5		Rockets	Green & Gray	
Fowler Elementary School	PK-5		Mustangs	Blue & Yellow	
Franklin Elementary School	K-5		Lions	Blue & Gray	
McNeil Elementary School	PK-5		The Colts	Blue & White	
Benjamin Milam Elementary School	PK-5		Bengals	Orange & Black	
Scotland Park Elementary School	PK-5		Scholars	Blue & Gray	
Sheppard Elementary School	PK-5		Jets	Red, White, & Blue	
Southern Hills Elementary School	PK-5		Panthers	Purple & Gray	Currently a charter school operated by Third Future Schools
Booker T. Washington Elementary School	PK-5		Leopards	Purple & White	Currently a charter school operated by Third Future Schools
West Foundation Elementary School	K-5	1996	Wolves	Blue & Yellow	
Zundy Elementary School	K-5	1925	Eagles	Purple & Gold	
Brook Village Early Childhood Center	PK	Unknown	Teddy Bears	Blue & White	
Haynes Head Start	PK	1964	Heroes	Blue & Yellow	

=== Alternative Schools ===
Alternative Schools
Name	Additional information
Career Education Center	
Denver Alternative Center	
Wichita County JJAEP	

=== Defunct schools ===
Reagan Junior High School – became Wichita Falls ISD Administration Building
Booker T. Washington High School (closed 1969, became Washington/Jackson Math/Science Center, name change back to Booker T. Washington in 2016)
Booker T. Washington Middle School (closed 1970)
Travis Elementary School
Austin Elementary (closed 2008)
Bonham Elementary (closed 2008)
Fannin Elementary (closed 2008)
McGaha Elementary (closed 2008)
Alamo Elementary - The Times Record News has a photograph of a class for Alamo elementary held in 1909. 1910 was officially the year it opened, the cornerstone stated 1910, and most sources stated that it opened in 1910; the structure at the time had 19,299 square feet (1,792.9 m^{2}) of space. Official documents had 1919 as an opening date. It received additions in 1919, 1926, 1930, 1985, 1989, and 2009. The school received a gymnasium on the last date. Alamo closed in 2014; at the time it was the oldest school in the city. In 2016 WFISD considered demolishing the school. In 2017 the district announced that the school would not be torn down after all. R.C. Graham purchased Alamo for $101,000. Graham wanted the gymnasium as well, but the district did not sell the gymnasium to him and instead wished to retain it so it could hold district events there. Graham would have paid $106,000 for the gymnasium.
Sam Houston School - Closed in 2014. The district considered storing items there.
Barwise/A. E. Holland School/Holland Alternative School - Opened in 1921, and was originally a grade 1-8 neighborhood school named Barwise School. It was reserved for white/non-black students only until it was converted into a school for black children in 1956. It was renamed A.E. Holland while the district established another school with the name Barwise. The neighborhood school closed in 1969 and was replaced with the alternative school, which closed in 2002 for financial reasons. In 2016 WFISD considered demolishing the school. In 2017 the district announced that the school would not be torn down after all. Gold Nugget Properties purchased the property for $101,000.
Barwise Junior High
Zundelowitz Junior High
- Barwise and Zundy were combined in 2014 and renamed "Barwise Leadership Academy".
Hirschi High School (closed 2024)
Rider High School (closed 2024)
Wichita Falls High School (closed 2024)
Lamar Elementary School (closed 2023)
Farris Early Childhood Center

2025: McNiel Middle School
