= Hirschi High School =

Public high school in Wichita Falls, Texas, U.S.

Coordinates: 33.934551°N 98.528847°W

John Hirschi IB Magnet High School
- 3106 Borton Lane; Wichita Falls, Texas 76306; United States

Information
- Type: Magnet school - Public Secondary
- Established: 1962
- Closed: May 24, 2024; 2 years ago
- School district: Wichita Falls Independent School District
- Staff: 54.97 (FTE)
- Grades: 9-12
- Student to teacher ratio: 14.01
- Colors: Columbia blue and scarlet
- Athletics: Football, Basketball, Volleyball, Track, Cross Country, Soccer, Tennis, Swimming, Baseball, Softball, and Golf
- Athletics conference: UIL District 6-AAAA
- Mascot: King the Husky; Team Competition - Huskies and Lady Huskies
- Rival: Burkburnett High School
- Newspaper: The Husky Howl
- Oversight: Texas Education Agency; International Baccalaureate

John R. Hirschi Math/Science International Baccalaureate Magnet High School, commonly known as Hirschi High School or HHS, was a four-year public high school in Wichita Falls, Texas, located at 3106 Borton Lane. It was an accredited International Baccalaureate (IB) World School offering the Diploma (IBDP) and Middle Years Program (MYP) to students wishing to pursue advanced academic study in mathematics, science, English, Spanish, French, history, and the arts. Hirschi, an award-winning member of the Magnet Schools of America Association, also offered its students hands-on instruction in aviation, studio/visual art, and nursing. Hirschi was one of three high schools prior to 2024 that were overseen by the Wichita Falls Independent School District (WFISD) and the Texas Education Agency.

== History ==
Recognizing the urgent need for a junior and senior high school in northern Wichita Falls, benefactor and businessman John R. Hirschi turned over the ownership of property to the WFISD; and, in September 1962, John Hirschi Junior-Senior High School opened under the leadership of Principal A. D. Neal. During its inaugural year, students chose Columbia Blue and Scarlet Red as the official school colors, and the Husky as the school's mascot. Hirschi was the third oldest public high school in Wichita Falls at the time of its closure.

Even though Hirschi never saw the school completed, his daughter, Mrytle Hirschi Ledford, remained committed to the education of Hirschi students until her death in 1994, often awarding scholarships and financial assistance to students.

During the early 1970s, the school enrollment exceeded capacity, forcing the construction of a new building for a separate junior high school. The new Hirschi Junior High School was, for a brief time, called Northwest Junior High, and was later renamed Kirby Junior High in honor of former WFISD Superintendent G.H. Kirby.

The Husky Field House, which also housed the band hall, was constructed for the basketball and volleyball teams during the early 1980s and was unique to the area because of its tartan playing surfaces.

In 1992, Hirschi High School became an official magnet school by adding a strong math/science based curriculum as well as a multimillion-dollar technology lab on the second floor. In 1998, Hirschi became an IB World School and graduated its first diploma and certificate recipients in 2002. Authorized to offer the IB Middle Years Program since February 2002, Hirschi operates the program in conjunction with Kirby Junior High.

In conjunction with Midwestern State University (MSU), Hirschi introduced dual-credit courses, in January 2009, to be taught on campus by an MSU professor.

With strong ties to the military because of the school's proximity to Sheppard Air Force Base, many Hirschi students had parents who are active duty or retired military.

In 2024 WFISD opened two new high schools – Legacy and Memorial – which opened for classes in the Fall of 2024. This meant Hirschi High shut its doors permanently at the end of the 2023-2024 school year, with students moving to one of the two new high schools. The campus was turned into a middle school following the 2023-2024 school year, replacing Kirby Junior High.

== Magnet programs ==
=== International Baccalaureate Program ===
Hirschi High School offered its students an internationally standardized program of study. In March 2007, Hirschi was authorized as an IB World School, offering the IB Diploma Program (IBDP) to its juniors and seniors and the IB Middle Years Program (MYP) to its underclassmen. Kirby Junior High School, which offered the MYP to 7th and 8th grade students, partnered with Hirschi to facilitate the transition from 8th grade to 9th grade. Students who received the IB Diploma with all passing test scores were guaranteed a minimum 24 college credit hours at any Texas public university. However, students who did not wish to take all of the courses required for the diploma program could work to obtain IB Certificates in individual subjects. Hirschi students were the only high school students in the Wichita Falls area able to take both International Baccalaureate and Advanced Placement exams at the end of the year. During graduation exercises in May, Hirschi diploma candidates are hooded by the IB Coordinator.

=== Aviation ===
Hirschi offered a magnet program in Aviation (the school being located near Sheppard Air Force Base), designed to give students the opportunity to learn principles of aviation and aerospace.

=== Medical ===
Sheppard is also a major Air Force medical training facility; thus, Hirschi also offered a magnet program in medicine, which allowed interested students to take specified courses that would immediately prepare them for college nursing programs and a successful career in the health care profession. Medical students not only had the opportunity to obtain their Certified Nursing Assistant (CNA) license on campus but also were provided with the opportunity to train and work at local medical facilities such as United Regional Health Care System, the primary hospital in the Wichita Falls metropolitan area. Also, Hirschi students who successfully obtained their CNA license were awarded pins during graduation exercises in May.

=== Multimedia ===
Hirschi was home to a multimillion-dollar technology and computer lab located on the second floor of the school's campus. Students in the multimedia program at Hirschi were given the opportunity to produce work in digital graphics, animation, video production, web design, newspaper, yearbook, and professional software. Hirschi IB diploma candidates had the opportunity to choose visual arts as their additional IB course of study. As a testament to the work produced by students in Hirschi’s multimedia program, ten Telly Awards, an award honoring creativity in business commercials and visual productions, had been presented to the school.

== Student life ==
Many Hirschi students balanced an academic life with the extracurricular activities the school had to offer. Along with traditional student government organizations, students could participate in clubs that were dedicated to academics, community service, technology, music, JROTC, and theater arts. Many students were also able to compete in varsity-level sports such as football, basketball, volleyball, track, soccer, tennis, softball, baseball, and golf.

In the fall, students, teachers, alumni, and fans would come together during the Hirschi football season, celebrating decades of tradition by showcasing "Husky pride". The Hirschi Huskies, who shared Memorial Stadium with the other two high schools in the district at the time, were usually supported by performances from the Big Blue Band from Huskyland, the Hirschi HiLites dance team, the Hirschi Cheerleaders, and the Hirschi Yell Squad.

In the spring, junior and senior students who demonstrated leadership, a commitment to service, and who maintain a high GPA were inducted in the Myrtle Hirschi Ledford Chapter of the National Honor Society. Also, among other student awards, four students from each class were chosen in the spring to receive the "Pride of Hirschi" award, which was the highest student award that could be bestowed upon a student by his or her peers.

The primary student newspaper for Hirschi was The Husky Howl which was a monthly publication. The annual yearbook was named The Husky.

Hirschi High School was classified as a Class 4A school by the University Interscholastic League and competed with other class 4A schools, in both academic and sporting events.

== School awards ==
- Magnet Schools of America Merit Award of Excellence: 2001, 2002, 2003, 2005, 2006
- Magnet Schools of America School of Distinction: 2004, 2007
- Magnet Schools of Texas Merit Award: 1999, 2001, 2002, 2003, 2004, 2005
- Telly Video Production Awards: 2002, 2003, 2004, 2005, 2007, 2008, 2010
- Videographer Award: 2003, 2004, 2007
- Aegis Award: 2003
- NASA Aerospace Scholars (3): 2000, 2004

=== Teachers awards ===
- Texas State Teacher of the Year 2005: Sherry Lindemann (History)
- West Foundation Teaching Excellence Award Winner 2006: Carrie Baker (English)
- West Foundation Teaching Excellence Award Winner 2005: Elizabeth McBroom (English)
- West Foundation Teaching Excellence Award Winner 2002 & 2004: Trevor Wildman (Chemistry)
- West Foundation Teaching Excellence Award Winner 2001 & 2004: Sherry Lindemann (History)
- Optimist Club Educator of the Year 2005: Christina Hoffmaster (Mathematics)
- ACS Outstanding Chemistry Teacher Award 2003 & 2005: Trevor Wildman
- Texoma's Best Teacher 2003: Henri Naylor (History)
- Lamar Teacher of Excellence 2003: Wayne Calhoon (Spanish)
- State Texas Classroom Teachers Association President 2004–2005: Shelby Patrick (Chemistry)

=== Music awards ===
- "Big Blue Band from Huskyland" - Sweepstakes Award (Superior Rating (1) in both Marching and Concert Seasons): 1973-1974, 1978-1979, 1999-2000, 2000–2001, 2003–2004, 2004–2005, 2005–2006, 2006–2007, and 2007–2008
- Hirschi Choir received 1st place at the Music in the Parks Festival in Illinois: Spring of 2007

=== Athletic awards ===
- Boys' Texas State Track and Field (3A) Long Jump Champion 1974, Stanley Wallace, Hirschi High School
- Boys' Basketball District Champs 1963, 1970, 1971, 1972, 1982, 1983, 1984, 1985, 1986, 1987, 1988, 1991, 1992, 1999, 2000, 2006, 2009, 2010
- Boys' Basketball Bi-District Champs 1983, 1984, 1987, 1988, 2000
- Girls' Basketball Regional Playoffs: 2004, 2005, 2006
- Boys' Swimming District Champs: 2003, 2004, 2005, 2006
- Girls' Swimming District Champs: 2003, 2004
- All-State Swimmer 2004, 2005: Jessica Wellington
- Softball Borger Tournament Champs and Optimist Tournament Champs: 2005
- Girls' Track State Qualifiers: 2007, 2010
- Boys' Soccer District, Bi-District, Area Champs: 2015

== Number Sense Team ==
In 2009 and 2010, the Hirschi Number Sense/Calculator team won the University Interscholastic League Class 3A Texas state number sense championship, giving the school both back-to-back team championships and an individual champion (Nathan Shih) in as many years.

== 2009-2010 accountability rating ==
Based on the accountability ratings released by the Texas Education Agency in November 2010, Hirschi High School is currently rated "Academically Acceptable."

== Notable alumni ==
- Marcus Foster (born 1995), basketball player for Hapoel Tel Aviv of the Israeli Basketball Premier League
