= Texas State Highway 79 =

State highway in Texas

State Highway 79
- SH 79 highlighted in red

Route information
- Maintained by TxDOT
- Length: 96.203 mi (154.824 km)
- Existed: 1923–present

Major junctions
- South end: US 183 / US 283 in Throckmorton
- US 281 in Wichita Falls; US 82 / US 287 in Wichita Falls
- North end: SH-79 at the Oklahoma state line near Byers

Location
- Country: United States
- State: Texas

Highway system
- Highways in Texas; Interstate; US; State; Former; Toll; Loops; Spurs; FM/RM; Park; Rec
← US 79	→ US 80

State Highway 79 (SH 79) is a state highway in the U.S. state of Texas that runs 96.203 miles (154.824 km) from Throckmorton to the Oklahoma state line near Byers.

== Route description ==
SH 79 begins at an intersection with US 183/US 283 in Throckmorton. The highway runs in an east–west direction until FM 926, east of Elbert. The highway turns northeast, running to Olney and Archer City. The highway enters Wichita Falls and almost immediately begins an overlap with US 281 on the Henry S. Grace Freeway. At the interchange with US 82/US 287, US 281 travels north to downtown while SH 79 travels to the east. Shortly after joining US 82/287, SH 79 leaves the highways and runs on the eastern edge of the city as the Waurika Freeway. SH 79 runs through Dean, Petrolia and Byers before entering Oklahoma as OK-79.

Beginning in 1939, a multiple-span pony truss bridge carried the highway across the Red River into Oklahoma. This bridge was replaced by a new bridge in 2018.

== History ==
It was originally designated on August 21, 1923, from Wichita Falls to Olney, replacing a portion of SH 22. On October 11, 1927, it was extended southwest to Throckmorton. On April 24, 1928, it was extended northeast to the Oklahoma state line. On April 24, 1933, the section from Olney to Elbert was cancelled, but restored on December 18, 1933. This section was completed by 1938. The section north of Wichita Falls was cancelled on July 15, 1935, but restored on February 11, 1937. The route was previously proposed as the northern sections of SH 22 and SH 23. The intersection of SH 79 and SH 25, in Archer City, was the location for the filming of movie The Last Picture Show in 1971.

== Junction list ==
County	Location	mi	km	Destinations	Notes
Throckmorton	Throckmorton			US 183 / US 283 – Seymour, Breckenridge, Albany	
Throckmorton				FM 2356 north	
Throckmorton				FM 2459 north	
Throckmorton	Elbert			FM 1711 south	South end of FM 1711 overlap
Throckmorton	Elbert			FM 1711 north	North end of FM 1711 overlap
Young				FM 578 south	
Young				FM 926 east – Newcastle	
Young				FM 2898 north – Megargel	
Young				FM 3366 north – Olney Municipal Airport	
Young				Loop 132 north	
Young	Olney			SH 251 south – Newcastle	
Young	Olney			FM 210 west – Megargel	
Young	Olney			SH 114 – Megargel, Loving	
Young				FM 1768 east – Markley	
Archer	Archer City			SH 25 – Mankins, Windthorst	
Archer				FM 2224 north	
Archer				FM 1954 – Holliday	
Archer	Lakeside City			FM 2380 north (Kemp Boulevard)	
Wichita	Wichita Falls			FM 369 west (Southwest Parkway) / Loop 473 (Old Jacksboro Highway)	Interchange
Wichita	Wichita Falls			US 281 south (Henry S. Grace Freeway) – Jacksboro	South end of US 281 overlap/freeway
Wichita	Wichita Falls			Hatton Road – Kickapoo Downtown Airport	
Wichita	Wichita Falls			Midwestern Parkway	
Wichita	Wichita Falls			US 82 west / US 281 north / US 287 north to I-44 – Seymour, Amarillo, Lawton	North end of US 281 overlap; south end of US 82/287 overlap
Wichita	Wichita Falls			Old Windthorst Road	
Wichita	Wichita Falls			US 82 east / US 287 south – Henrietta, Fort Worth	North end of US 82/287 overlap
Wichita	Wichita Falls			Hammon Road	Southbound exit and northbound entrance
Wichita	Wichita Falls			Bus. US 287 (Old Henrietta Highway)	Southbound exit via the Petrolia Road exit
Wichita	Wichita Falls			Petrolia Road	Southbound exit and northbound entrance; north end of freeway
Clay				FM 3393 west (Old Petrolia Road)	South end of FM 3393 overlap
Clay	Dean			FM 3393 east (Tammen Road)	North end of FM 3393 overlap
Clay	Dean			FM 2393 – Thornberry, Jolly	
Clay	Petrolia			SH 148 south / FM 810 north – Henrietta, Charlie	
Clay	Byers			FM 171 east	South end of FM 171 overlap
Clay	Byers			FM 171 west – Charlie	North end of FM 171 overlap
Clay				SH-79 north – Waurika	Continuation into Oklahoma
1.000 mi = 1.609 km; 1.000 km = 0.621 mi: Concurrency terminus; Incomplete access
