= List of Farm to Market Roads in Texas (1700–1799) =

- Texas Farm to Market Road and Ranch to Market Road markers

Highway names
- Interstates: Interstate Highway X (IH-X, I-X)
- US Highways: U.S. Highway X (US X)
- State: State Highway X (SH X)
- Loops: Loop X
- Spurs: Spur X
- Recreational: Recreational Road X (RE X)
- Farm or Ranch to Market Roads: Farm to Market Road X (FM X); Ranch to Market Road X (RM X)
- Park Roads: Park Road X (PR X)

System links
- Highways in Texas; Interstate; US; State; Former; Toll; Loops; Spurs; FM/RM; Park; Rec

Farm to Market Roads in Texas are owned and maintained by the Texas Department of Transportation (TxDOT).

== FM 1700 ==
Farm to Market Road 1700
- Location: Red River County
- Length: 3.387 mi (5.451 km)
- Existed: May 23, 1951–present

Farm to Market Road 1700 (FM 1700) is located in Red River County. It runs from FM 1159 northeast of Clarksville eastward approximately 3.4 miles (5.5 km) toward the community of Madras before state maintenance ends. The roadway continues as CR 3275.

FM 1700 was established on May 23, 1951, along the current route.

== FM 1701 ==
Farm to Market Road 1701
- Location: Red River and Bowie counties
- Length: 15.569 mi (25.056 km)
- Existed: May 23, 1951–present

Farm to Market Road 1701 is a 15.569-mile (25.056 km) state road in Red River that connects FM 44 (south of Annona) with US 259 (west of De Kalb).

== FM 1702 ==
Farm to Market Road 1702
- Location: Erath, Comanche, and Hamilton counties
- Length: 30.868 mi (49.677 km)
- Existed: 1951–present

== FM 1703 ==
Farm to Market Road 1703
- Location: Brewster County
- Length: 3.933 mi (6.330 km)
- Existed: September 27, 1960–present

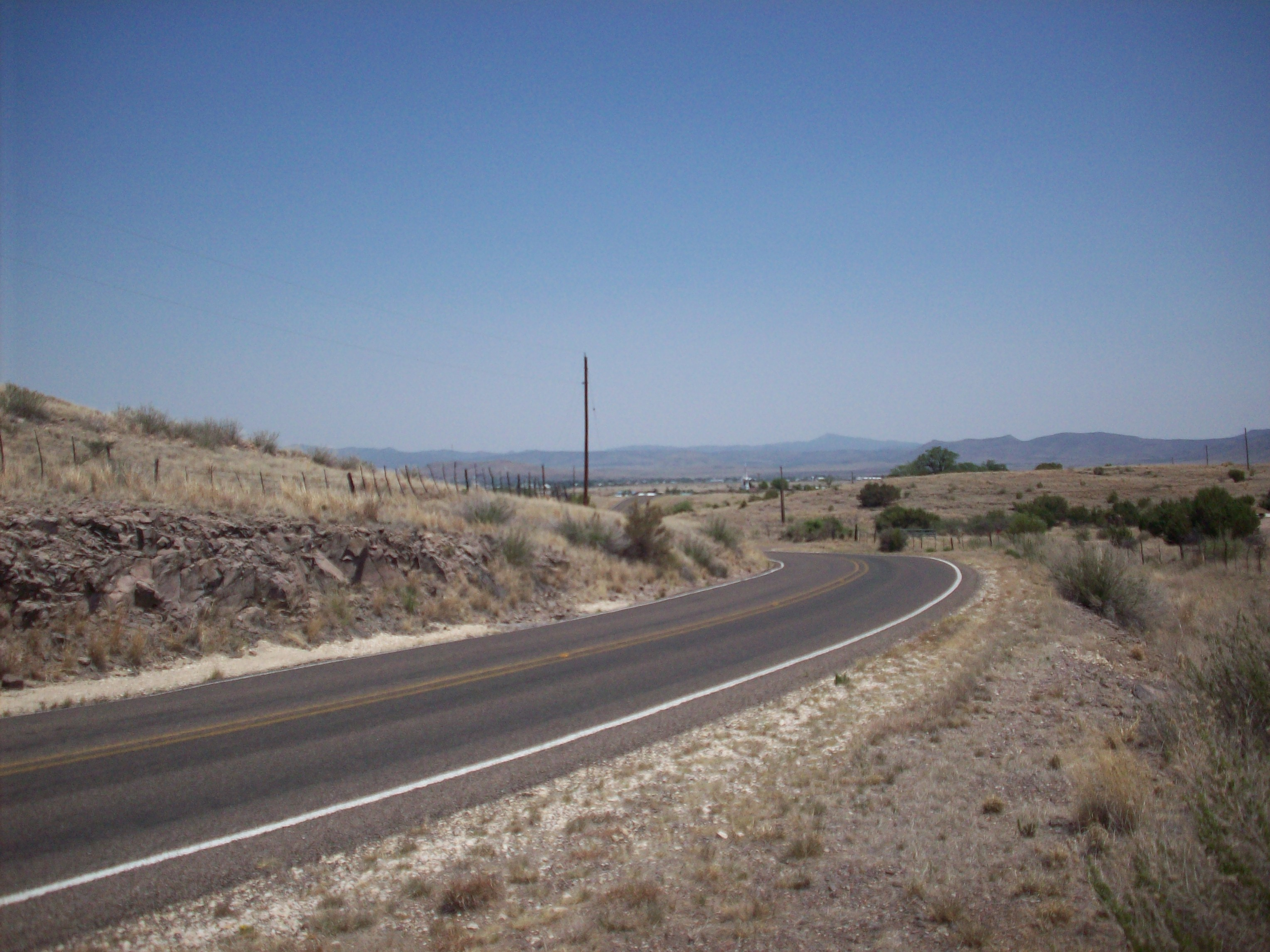
FM 1703 northwest of Alpine

Farm to Market Road 1703 (FM 1703) is located in Brewster County. Its southern terminus is at US 67/US 90 in Alpine. FM 1703 runs 3.9 miles (6.3 km) west and then north before state maintenance ends.

FM 1703 was designated on September 27, 1960 as Ranch to Market Road 1703 (RM 1703), along the current route. The designation was changed to FM 1703 on May 5, 1992.

=== FM 1703 (mid-1951) ===
Farm to Market Road 1703
- Location: Erath and Hood Counties
- Existed: May 23, 1951–July 5, 1951

A previous route numbered FM 1703, was designated on May 23, 1951, from FM 4 at Lipan southwestward, a distance of approximately 3.9 miles. This was cancelled by July 5, 1951, and became a portion of FM 1189.

=== FM 1703 (1951) ===
Farm to Market Road 1703
- Location: Lynn County
- Existed: July 25, 1951–February 3, 1960

Another previous route numbered FM 1703 was designated in Lynn County on July 25, 1951, from US 84 near the Lubbock County line southward 6.2 miles (10.0 km) to FM 211. FM 1703 was cancelled on February 3, 1960, and its mileage was transferred to FM 212.

== FM 1704 ==
Farm to Market Road 1704
- Location: Bastrop County
- Length: 10.158 mi (16.348 km)
- Existed: 1951–present

FM 1704 is located in Bastrop County. It runs from Loop 109 in Elgin southward across US 290 to FM 969.

FM 1704 was designated on May 23, 1951, from Loop 109 southward 9.5 miles (15.3 km). The extension to FM 969 was approved on December 17, 1952.

== FM 1705 ==
Farm to Market Road 1705
- Location: Randall County
- Length: 19.212 mi (30.919 km)
- Existed: December 17, 1952–present

=== FM 1705 (1951) ===
Farm to Market Road 1705
- Location: Johnson County
- Existed: May 23, 1951–February 6, 1953

FM 1705 was first designated on May 23, 1951, as a route in Johnson County, running from SH 353 (now SH 174) at Rio Vista to SH 171 at a distance of 6.2 miles (10.0 km). On October 16, 1951, the highway was rerouted, decreasing its length by 0.5 miles (0.8 km). FM 1705 was cancelled on February 6, 1953, with its mileage transferred to an extension of FM 916.

== FM 1706 ==
Farm to Market Road 1706
- Location: Johnson County
- Length: 0.806 mi (1,297 m)
- Existed: 1951–present

Farm to Market Road 1706 (FM 1706) is located entirely in the town of Alvarado in Johnson County. The highway is known locally as South Sparks Street.

Junction list

The entire route is in Alvarado, Johnson County.

mi	km	Destinations	Notes
0.0	0.0	I-35 BL	
0.6	0.97	FM 1807 east (East Davis Avenue)	
0.8	1.3	Bus. US 67 (East College Street)	
1.000 mi = 1.609 km; 1.000 km = 0.621 mi

== FM 1707 ==
Farm to Market Road 1707
- Location: Callahan County
- Length: 0.582 mi (937 m)
- Existed: July 29, 1993–present

=== FM 1707 (1951) ===
Farm to Market Road 1707
- Location: Parker County
- Existed: May 23, 1951–December 20, 1984

A previous route numbered FM 1707 was designated in Parker County on May 23, 1951, running from US 80 (now US 180) east of Weatherford to Dicey at a distance of 5.2 miles (8.4 km). The route was extended 6.0 miles (9.7 km) to Silver Creek on December 17, 1952. FM 1707 was extended 3.5 miles (5.6 km) to a road intersection on October 29, 1953. The road was extended to SH 199 in Azle on June 28, 1955. This route was cancelled on December 20, 1984, with the mileage being transferred to FM 730.

== FM 1708 ==
Farm to Market Road 1708
- Location: Parker County
- Length: 1.588 mi (2.556 km)
- Existed: 1951–present

== FM 1709 ==
Farm to Market Road 1709
- Location: Tarrant County
- Length: 9.128 mi (14.690 km)
- Existed: 1951–present

== FM 1710 ==
Farm to Market Road 1710
- Location: Throckmorton County
- Length: 6.186 mi (9.955 km)
- Existed: 1951–present

== FM 1711 ==
Farm to Market Road 1711
- Location: Throckmorton County
- Length: 11.07 mi (Note: The certified length given is shorter than the actual mileage, as the TxDOT description of FM 1711 considers it to be discontinuous at rather than concurrent with SH 79.) (17.82 km)
- Existed: 1951–present

Farm to Market Road 1711 (FM 1711) is located in Throckmorton County. The road begins east of Throckmorton at an intersection with US 380, and continues north intersecting with SH 79 until it ends at a county road north of Elbert.

FM 1711 was designated on May 23, 1951, running from SH 79 in Elbert north 3.7 miles (6.0 km) to a road intersection. On August 24, 1955, FM 1711 was extended south 3.0 miles (4.8 km). On November 21, 1956, FM 1711 was extended south to SH 24 (now US 380).

Junction list

The entire route is in Throckmorton County.

Location	mi	km	Destinations	Notes
	0.0	0.0	US 380 – Throckmorton, Graham	
Elbert	7.5	12.1	SH 79 south – Throckmorton	South end of SH 79 overlap
Elbert	7.6	12.2	SH 79 north – Olney	North end of SH 79 overlap
	11.2	18.0	County Road 440 / County Road 442	
1.000 mi = 1.609 km; 1.000 km = 0.621 mi: Concurrency terminus

== FM 1712 ==
Farm to Market Road 1712
- Location: Milam County
- Length: 5.063 mi (8.148 km)
- Existed: June 1, 1960–present

=== FM 1712 (1951) ===
Farm to Market Road 1712
- Location: Hartley County
- Existed: May 23, 1951–December 18, 1959

A previous route numbered FM 1712 was designated in Hartley County on May 23, 1951, running from US 87 southeast of Dalhart to US 87 at Hartley at a distance of 17.4 miles (28.0 km). Part of FM 1712 was transferred to FM 281 on December 7, 1953. The route was cancelled on December 18, 1959, with the mileage being transferred to FM 807.

== FM 1713 ==
Farm to Market Road 1713
- Location: Hill and Bosque counties
- Length: 9.902 mi (15.936 km)
- Existed: October 31, 1958–present

=== FM 1713 (1951) ===
Farm to Market Road 1713
- Location: Lipscomb County
- Existed: May 23, 1951–November 29, 1957

FM 1713 was originally designated on May 23, 1951, running from SH 117 at Follett southward at a distance of 4.5 miles (7.2 km). This highway was cancelled on November 29, 1957, with the mileage being transferred to FM 1454.

== FM 1714 ==
Farm to Market Road 1714
- Location: Randall County
- Length: 10.503 mi (16.903 km)
- Existed: 1951–present

== FM 1715 ==
Farm to Market Road 1715
- Location: Lampasas County
- Length: 6.351 mi (10.221 km)
- Existed: July 29, 1993–present

Farm to Market Road 1715 (FM 1715) is located in Lampasas County. The road begins at FM 580 outside of Lampasas and continues east until ending at US 190 east of Lampasas.

The current FM 1715 was designated on July 29, 1993, from US 190 northward 2.2 miles (3.5 km). On June 27, 1995, FM 1715 was extended west to FM 580.

=== FM 1715 (1951) ===
Farm to Market Road 1715
- Location: Rusk County
- Existed: May 23, 1951–January 27, 1953

The first route numbered FM 1715 was designated in Rusk County on May 23, 1951, running from FM 348 at Pine Hill to US 79 at a distance of 3.6 miles (5.8 km). The route was cancelled on January 27, 1953, with the mileage being transferred to FM 348. The old route of FM 348 became part of FM 1798.

=== FM 1715 (1952) ===
Farm to Market Road 1715
- Location: Erath County
- Existed: December 17, 1952–December 20, 1984

The second route numbered FM 1715 was designated in Erath County on December 17, 1952 (numbered January 27, 1953 or later), running from US 281 at Morgan Mill northwestward to Sapoak at a distance of 6.2 miles (10.0 km). On September 20, 1961, he highway was extended 5.2 miles (8.4 km) westward to the end of FM 2463. On October 3, 1961, the road was extended to SH 108, absorbing FM 2463 in the process. FM 1715 was cancelled on December 20, 1984, with the mileage being transferred to FM 1188.

== FM 1716 ==
Farm to Market Road 1716
- Location: Rusk County
- Length: 18.908 mi (30.429 km)
- Existed: June 30, 1955–present

=== FM 1716 (May 1951) ===
Farm to Market Road 1716
- Location: Rusk County
- Existed: May 23, 1951–December 10, 1951

The first use of FM 1716 was in Rusk County, from FM 225 at Laneville northwest to FM 839. Six months later FM 1716 was cancelled and became a portion of FM 95.

=== FM 1716 (December 1951) ===
Farm to Market Road 1716
- Location: Hopkins County
- Existed: December 18, 1951–January 16, 1953

The second use of FM 1716 was in Hopkins County, from SH 154 east to Reilly Springs. FM 1716 was cancelled on January 16, 1953, and transferred to FM 1567.

=== FM 1716 (1952) ===
Farm to Market Road 1716
- Location: Erath County
- Existed: December 17, 1952–October 25, 1954

The third use of FM 1716 was in Erath County, from SH 108 at Huckabay southwest 7.0 miles (11.3 km) to a road intersection. It was numbered on January 27, 1953 or later. FM 1716 was cancelled on October 25, 1954, and became a portion of FM 219.

== FM 1717 ==
Farm to Market Road 1717
- Location: Kleberg County
- Length: 5.209 mi (8.383 km)
- Existed: August 20, 1952–present

Farm to Market Road 1717 (FM 1717) is located in Kleberg County. Its southern terminus is at CR 1070 south of Naval Air Station Kingsville. FM 1717 runs to the northwest, intersecting FM 2619 and FM 3320, before crossing into Kingsville. It intersects US 77 and then turns north toward downtown Kingsville along Brahma Boulevard. FM 1717 crosses FM 1356 (General Cavazos Boulevard) before reaching its northern terminus at Bus. US 77.

The current FM 1717 was designated on August 20, 1952, along the current route. As of 2022, the intersection with US 77 is being upgraded to an interchange in anticipation of that route's conversion to a freeway and subsequent designation as I-69E.

=== FM 1717 (1951) ===
Farm to Market Road 1717
- Location: Rusk County
- Existed: May 23, 1951–July 9, 1952

A previous route numbered FM 1717 was designated in Rusk County on May 23, 1951, from FM 782 near Oak Hill northeast to SH 149. The FM 1717 designation was cancelled on July 9, 1952, and its mileage was transferred to FM 782.

== FM 1718 ==
Farm to Market Road 1718
- Location: Johnson County
- Length: 3.46 mi (5.57 km)
- Existed: July 30, 1964–present

Farm to Market Road 1718 (FM 1718) is located in Johnson County. It runs from SH 171 at Cleburne southwest to Harvest Hill Road.

FM 1718 was designated on July 30, 1964, from SH 171 at Cleburne southwest to Cleburne Reservoir as a replacement of a section of FM 1434. On December 15, 2005, a 0.2-mile (0.32 km) section from Harvest Hill Road to Cleburne Reservoir was removed from the highway system and turned over to the city of Cleburne.

=== FM 1718 (1951) ===
Farm to Market Road 1718
- Location: Dawson and Martin counties
- Existed: May 23, 1951–October 10, 1961

A previous route numbered FM 1718 was designated on May 23, 1951, from RM 87 (now SH 176), 4 miles (6.4 km) east of SH 137, north 10.0 miles (16.1 km) to a road intersection. On September 29, 1954, the road was extended northwest 5.8 miles (9.3 km) to the Dawson County line. On October 26, 1954, a 3.7-mile (6.0 km) section from the Dawson County line to SH 349 was added. On September 2, 1960, the road was extended to US 180, replacing a section of FM 1064. FM 1718 was cancelled on October 10, 1961, and transferred to FM 829.

== FM 1719 ==
Farm to Market Road 1719
- Location: Potter County
- Length: 10.094 mi (16.245 km)
- Existed: May 23, 1951–present

=== FM 1719 (May 1951) ===
Farm to Market Road 1719
- Location: Kendall County
- Existed: May 23, 1951–July 18, 1951

A previous route numbered FM 1719 was designated on May 23, 1951, from US 87 in Boerne southwest to the Bandera County line. Two months later FM 1719 was cancelled and became a part of FM 475.

== FM 1720 ==
Farm to Market Road 1720
- Location: Haskell County
- Length: 8.756 mi (14.091 km)
- Existed: December 17, 1952–present

Farm to Market Road 1720 (FM 1720) is located in Haskell County. It runs from SH 24 to SH 222.

FM 1720 was designated on December 17, 1952 (numbered January 16, 1953 or later), from SH 24 9 miles (14 km) west of Throckmorton, northwest 6 miles (9.7 km). On October 28, 1953, FM 1720 was extended northwest 6.5 miles (10.5 km) to a road intersection. On September 29, 1954, FM 1720 was extended west to US 277 at Weinert. On September 5, 1973, the section from FM 266 to US 380 was signed (but not designated) as part of SH 222. On August 29, 1990, this section was officially redesignated as part of SH 222.

=== FM 1720 (May 1951) ===
Farm to Market Road 1720
- Location: Tom Green County
- Existed: May 23, 1951–November 28, 1951

The first route numbered FM 1720 was designated on May 23, 1951, from US 87 (now FM 1223) 1 mile (1.6 km) east of US 277 east 6.6 miles (10.6 km). FM 1720 was cancelled on November 28, 1951, and transferred to FM 765.

=== FM 1720 (December 1951) ===
Farm to Market Road 1720
- Location: Hopkins County
- Existed: December 18, 1951–January 16, 1953

The second route numbered FM 1720 was designated on January 16, 1953, from SH 154 west to Arbala and north to a road intersection 5.6 miles (9.0 km) from SH 154. FM 1720 was cancelled on January 16, 1953, and transferred to FM 1567.

== FM 1721 ==
Farm to Market Road 1721
- Location: Randall County
- Length: 2.565 mi (4.128 km)
- Existed: October 31, 1958–present

=== FM 1721 (1951) ===
Farm to Market Road 1721
- Location: DeWitt County
- Existed: May 23, 1951–November 20, 1951

A previous route numbered FM 1721 was designated on May 23, 1951, from SH 29, 5 miles (8.0 km) south of Cuero, to Arneckeville. On November 20, 1951, FM 1721 was eliminated; FM 236 was extended instead.

== FM 1722 ==
Farm to Market Road 1722
- Location: Ellis County
- Length: 5.773 mi (9.291 km)
- Existed: January 18, 1952–present

=== FM 1722 (1951) ===
Farm to Market Road 1722
- Location: DeWitt County
- Existed: May 23, 1951–January 17, 1952

A previous route numbered FM 1722 was designated on May 23, 1951, from FM 682, 1 mile (1.6 km) west of Terryville, southwest to Stratton. FM 1722 was cancelled on January 17, 1952, and transferred to FM 1447.

== RM 1723 ==
Ranch to Market Road 1723
- Location: Mason County
- Length: 3.985 mi (6.413 km)
- Existed: May 23, 1951 (Note: RM 1723 was previously designated as FM 1723 from 1951 to 1956.)–present

It was originally FM 1723 from 1951 to 1956.

== FM 1724 ==
Farm to Market Road 1724
- Location: Chambers County
- Length: 4.911 mi (7.903 km)
- Existed: 1951–present

== FM 1725 ==
Farm to Market Road 1725
- Location: Liberty and San Jacinto counties
- Length: 20.442 mi (32.898 km)
- Existed: 1951–present

== FM 1726 ==
Farm to Market Road 1726
- Location: Goliad County
- Length: 12.332 mi (19.846 km)
- Existed: 1951–present

== FM 1727 ==
Farm to Market Road 1727
- Location: Dallam County
- Length: 18.678 mi (30.059 km)
- Existed: February 18, 1955 (FM 1727 was moved north one mile on September 21, 1955)–present

=== FM 1727 (1951) ===
Farm to Market Road 1727
- Location: Matagorda County
- Existed: May 23, 1951–November 12, 1954

A previous route numbered FM 1727 was designated on May 23, 1951, from SH 35 west via Blessing to the Jackson County line. FM 1727 was cancelled on November 12, 1954, and became a portion of FM 616.

== FM 1728 ==
Farm to Market Road 1728
- Location: Matagorda County
- Length: 9.559 mi (15.384 km)
- Existed: 1951–present

== FM 1729 ==
Farm to Market Road 1729
- Location: Lubbock County
- Length: 30.656 mi (49.336 km)
- Existed: 1951–present

== FM 1730 ==
Farm to Market Road 1730
- Location: Lubbock and Lynn counties
- Length: 18.444 mi (29.683 km)
- Existed: 1951–present

== FM 1731 ==
Farm to Market Road 1731
- Location: Parmer and Bailey counties
- Length: 52.064 mi (83.789 km)
- Existed: 1951–present

== FM 1732 ==
Farm to Market Road 1732
- Location: Cameron County
- Length: 5.092 mi (8.195 km)
- Existed: January 29, 1957–present

=== FM 1732 (1951) ===
Farm to Market Road 1732
- Location: Houston County
- Existed: May 23, 1951–December 17, 1956

A previous route numbered FM 1732 was designated on May 23, 1951, from SH 21 at Austonio west to Ash. FM 1732 was cancelled on December 17, 1956, and became a portion of FM 1280.

== FM 1733 ==
Farm to Market Road 1733
- Location: Houston County
- Length: 10.336 mi (16.634 km)
- Existed: 1951–present

== FM 1734 ==
Farm to Market Road 1734
- Location: Titus County
- Length: 8.871 mi (14.276 km)
- Existed: 1951–present

== FM 1735 ==
Farm to Market Road 1735
- Location: Titus County
- Length: 8.199 mi (13.195 km)
- Existed: 1951–present

== FM 1736 ==
Farm to Market Road 1736
- Location: Waller County
- Length: 17.139 mi (27.583 km)
- Existed: May 23, 1951–present

Farm to Market Road 1736 (FM 1736) is located in Waller County. It runs from US 290 to FM 1488.

FM 1736 was designated on May 23, 1951, from US 290 northwest of Hempstead north and east to SH 6 north of Hempstead. On September 20, 1961, the road was extended east 7.7 miles (12.4 km) to FM 1488. On May 2, 1962, the eastern terminus was relocated south, lengthening the route by 1.8 miles.

== FM 1737 ==
Farm to Market Road 1737
- Location: Hunt County
- Length: 2.778 mi (4.471 km)
- Existed: 1951–present

== FM 1738 ==
Farm to Market Road 1738
- Location: Jasper County
- Length: 4.279 mi (6.886 km)
- Existed: December 17, 1952–present

=== FM 1738 (1951) ===
Farm to Market Road 1738
- Location: Hunt County
- Existed: May 23, 1951–January 16, 1953

A previous route numbered FM 1738 was designated on May 23, 1951, from FM 118 at Jacobia north and east 3.0 miles (4.8 km) to a county road. FM 1738 was cancelled on January 16, 1953, and transferred to FM 118.

== FM 1739 ==
Farm to Market Road 1739
- Location: Wichita County
- Length: 10.644 mi (17.130 km)
- Existed: 1951–present

== FM 1740 ==
Farm to Market Road 1740
- Location: Wichita and Clay counties
- Length: 14.199 mi (22.851 km)
- Existed: 1951–present

Farm to Market Road 1740 (FM 1740) is located in Wichita and Clay counties. It begins at FM 171 just outside of Wichita Falls and runs northeastward along Lower Charlie Road to an intersection with FM 810.

FM 1740 was designated on May 23, 1951, running from FM 171 5.4 miles (8.7 km) to the Clay County line. The highway was extended 1.6 miles (2.6 km) to a road intersection on December 17, 1952. FM 1740 was extended to its current eastern terminus at FM 810 on August 24, 1955.

Junction list

The entire route is in Wichita County.

Location	mi	km	Destinations	Notes
	0.0	0.0	FM 171 – Wichita Falls, Charlie	
	8.9	14.3	FM 2393 – Thornberry, Dean	
	14.2	22.9	FM 810 – Charlie, Petrolia	
1.000 mi = 1.609 km; 1.000 km = 0.621 mi

== FM 1741 ==
Farm to Market Road 1741
- Location: Bell County
- Length: 5.428 mi (8.736 km)
- Existed: December 18, 1951–present

Farm to Market Road 1741 (FM 1741) is located in Temple, where it is known locally as 31st Street.

FM 1741 begins at an intersection with FM 93 near the southern edge of the city. The highway travels in a slight northeast direction and travels through suburban areas of the city before passing through a major retail center near US 190/SH 36/Loop 363. FM 1741 passes by a major medical center and travels just east of I-35 before ending at an intersection with SH 53 about a mile west of downtown Temple.

The current FM 1741 was designated on December 18, 1951, running from US 81 in Belton to the southern Temple city limit at a distance of approximately 8.0 miles (12.9 km). The highway was extended 0.5 miles (0.80 km) to Avenue H in Temple on May 2, 1962. The section of FM 1741 between US 81 and FM 2618 was realigned and transferred to FM 93 on January 31, 1974, along with FM 2618 itself. The northern terminus of the highway was extended to SH 53 on November 29, 1990. On June 27, 1995, the entire route was redesignated Urban Road 1741 (UR 1741). The designation reverted to FM 1741 with the elimination of the Urban Road system on November 15, 2018.

Junction list

The entire route is in Temple, Bell County.

mi	km	Destinations	Notes
0.0	0.0	FM 93 to I-35 / SH 95	
3.2	5.1	US 190 / SH 36 / Loop 363 (H.K. Dodgen Loop)	Future I-14
5.3	8.5	SH 53 east (Central Avenue)	
5.4	8.7	SH 53 west (Adams Avenue) to I-35 – Airport	
1.000 mi = 1.609 km; 1.000 km = 0.621 mi

=== FM 1741 (1951) ===
Farm to Market Road 1741
- Location: Kent County
- Existed: May 23, 1951–May 20, 1952

FM 1741 was first designated on May 23, 1951, running from US 380 west of Clairemont southward to the Double Mountain Fork Brazos River at a distance of 4.6 miles (7.4 km). The highway was extended 1.5 miles (2.4 km) southward on November 11, 1951. FM 1741 was cancelled on May 20, 1952, with the mileage being transferred to FM 1231 (now SH 208).

== FM 1742 ==
Farm to Market Road 1742
- Location: Delta County
- Length: 2.48 mi (3.99 km)
- Existed: April 24, 1953–present

=== FM 1742 (1951) ===
Farm to Market Road 1742
- Location: Coryell and McLennan Counties
- Existed: May 23, 1951–February 20, 1952

The first use of FM 1742 was designated on May 23, 1951, in Coryell County, from Spur 18 at Oglesby to SH 236 north of Mother Neff State Park. On July 6, 1951, the road was extended 1.3 miles (2.1 km) north to US 84, replacing Spur 18. On November 20, 1951, the road was extended to SH 317, replacing part of SH 236. FM 1742 was cancelled on February 20, 1952, and transferred to FM 107.

=== FM 1742 (1952) ===
Farm to Market Road 1742
- Location: Martin County
- Existed: February 21, 1952–April 9, 1953

The second use of FM 1742 was designated on February 21, 1952, in Martin County, from SH 137 at Flower Grove east and south to FM 846. On January 29, 1953, a 5.2-mile (8.4 km) section from SH 137 to FM 2002 was transferred to FM 2002. FM 1742 was cancelled on April 9, 1953, and transferred to FM 26.

== FM 1743 ==
Farm to Market Road 1743
- Location: Fannin County
- Length: 12.225 mi (19.674 km)
- Existed: December 18, 1951–present

=== FM 1743 (1951) ===
Farm to Market Road 1743
- Location: Hamilton County
- Existed: May 23, 1951–January 15, 1952

A previous route numbered FM 1743 was designated on May 23, 1951, from FM 218 at Pottsville to a road intersection 2.9 miles (4.7 km) northwest of Shive. On January 15, 1952, FM 1743 was cancelled and transferred to FM 221.

== FM 1744 ==
Farm to Market Road 1744
- Location: Hamilton County
- Length: 11.728 mi (18.874 km)
- Existed: 1951–present

== FM 1745 ==
Farm to Market Road 1745
- Location: Polk and Tyler counties
- Length: 20.66 mi (33.25 km)
- Existed: 1951–present

== FM 1746 ==
Farm to Market Road 1746
- Location: Tyler County
- Length: 13.684 mi (22.022 km)
- Existed: 1951–present

== FM 1747 ==
Farm to Market Road 1747
- Location: Jasper County
- Length: 6.93 mi (11.15 km)
- Existed: 1951–present

== FM 1748 ==
Farm to Market Road 1748
- Location: Grimes County
- Length: 1.562 mi (2.514 km)
- Existed: February 19, 1952–present

Farm to Market Road 1748 (FM 1748) is a two-lane highway connecting the community of Yarboro to State Highway 105.

The route, in conjunction with Grimes County Road 306, also serves as a way for northbound traffic on State Highway 249 to get to State Highway 105 eastbound, and for westbound traffic on State Highway 105 to get to State Highway 249 southbound as the intersection of the two highways is an incomplete interchange, serving only two of the four possible directions.

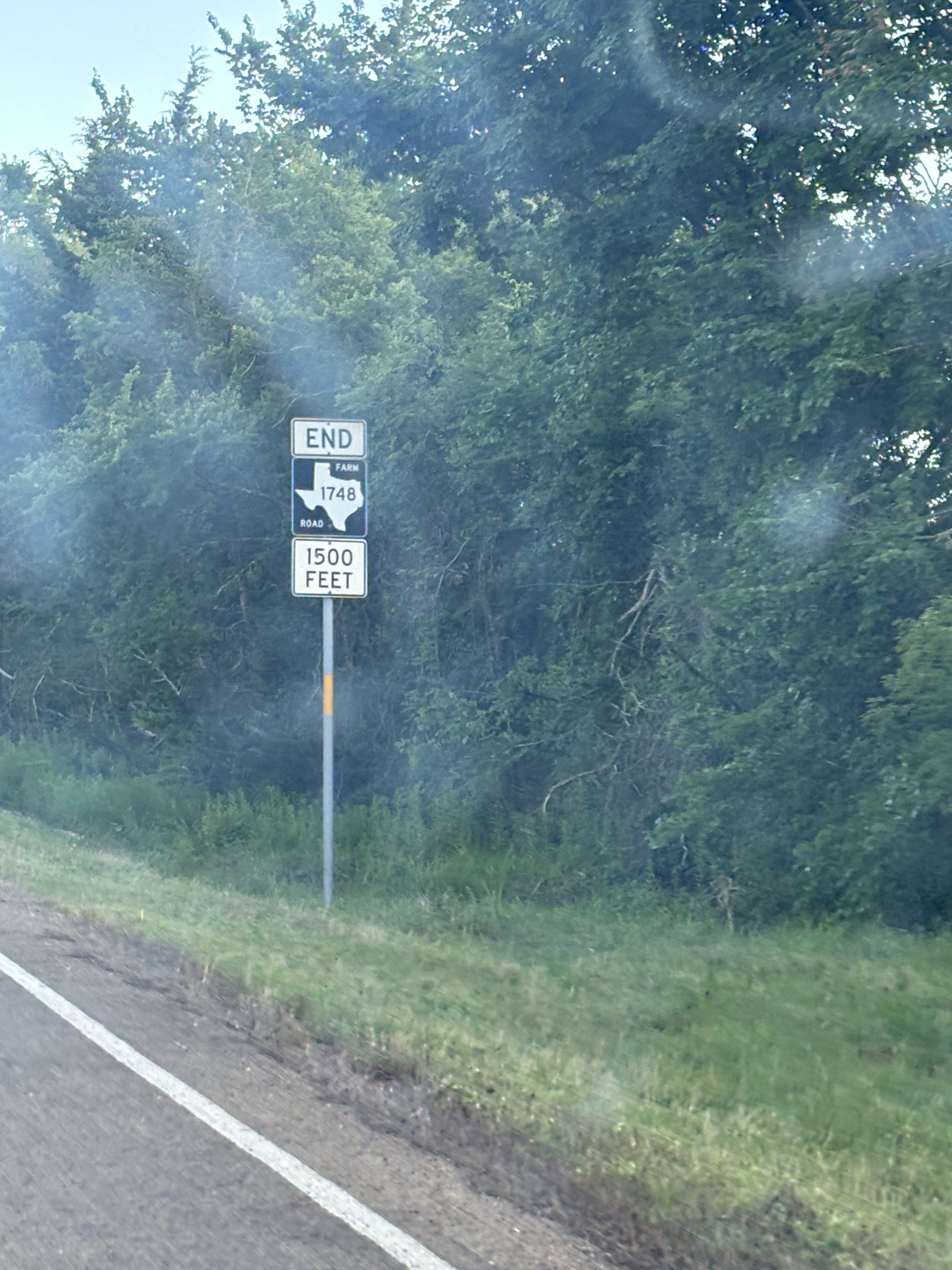
FM 1748 Shield (End 1500 ft) near Yarboro, Texas

=== FM 1748 (1951) ===
Farm to Market Road 1748
- Location: Taylor County
- Existed: May 23, 1951–February 20, 1952

A previous route numbered FM 1748 was designated on May 23, 1951, from US 83 at Guion to FM 688, 1 mile (1.6 km) west of Lawn. FM 1748 was cancelled on February 20, 1952, and transferred to FM 604.

== FM 1749 ==
Farm to Market Road 1749
- Location: Montague County
- Length: 12.191 mi (19.620 km)
- Existed: September 29, 1954–present

Farm to Market Road 1749 (FM 1749) is a two-lane highway that connects the farming areas near Forestburg with SH 101 at Sunset in far south central Montague County.

FM 1749 runs from SH 101 in Sunset to FM 455 near Forestburg.

The current FM 1749 was designated on September 29, 1954 (numbered October 15 or later), running from US 81 (now SH 101) to a road intersection at a distance of 7.1 miles (11.4 km). The highway was extended 5.9 miles (9.5 km) to FM 455 on May 6, 1964.

=== FM 1749 (May 1951) ===
Farm to Market Road 1749
- Location: Taylor County
- Existed: May 23, 1951–October 9, 1951

The first route numbered FM 1749 was designated on May 23, 1951, running from US 83 at Tuscola eastward to US 84 at a distance of 2.8 miles (4.5 km). The route was cancelled on October 9, 1951, with the mileage being transferred to FM 613.

=== FM 1749 (October 1951) ===
Farm to Market Road 1749
- Location: Atascosa and Bexar counties
- Existed: October 16, 1951–May 25, 1953

The second route numbered FM 1749 was designated on October 16, 1951, running from US 81 (now SH 132) in Lytle to the community of Bexar. On April 21, 1953, the route was extended east to Somerset. The route was cancelled on May 25, 1953, with the mileage being transferred to FM 1518.

=== FM 1749 (1953) ===
Farm to Market Road 1749
- Location: Pecos and Terrell counties
- Existed: June 25, 1953–October 15, 1954

The third route numbered FM 1749 was designated on June 25, 1953, running from US 290 (now SH 290) at Sheffield 6.3 miles (10.1 km) to the Terrell County line. The highway was extended 12.0 miles (19.3 km) on October 29, 1953. FM 1749 was cancelled on October 15, 1954, with the mileage being transferred to FM 1217 (now SH 349).

== FM 1750 ==
Farm to Market Road 1750
- Location: Callahan and Taylor counties
- Length: 12.019 mi (19.343 km)
- Existed: 1951–present

== FM 1751 ==
Farm to Market Road 1751
- Location: San Augustine County
- Length: 18.733 mi (30.148 km)
- Existed: April 24, 1953–present

=== FM 1751 (1951) ===
Farm to Market Road 1751
- Location: Fannin County
- Existed: July 25, 1951–April 7, 1953

A previous route numbered FM 1751 was designated on July 25, 1951, from SH 78, 2.5 miles (4.0 km) west of Leonard, south to the Collin County line. FM 1751 was cancelled on April 7, 1953, and transferred to FM 981.

== FM 1752 ==
Farm to Market Road 1752
- Location: Fannin County
- Length: 12.122 mi (19.508 km)
- Existed: 1951–present

== FM 1753 ==
Farm to Market Road 1753
- Location: Grayson and Fannin counties
- Length: 21.923 mi (35.282 km)
- Existed: 1951–present

== FM 1754 ==
Farm to Market Road 1754
- Location: Donley County
- Length: 2.64 mi (4.25 km)
- Existed: July 25, 1951–present

Farm to Market Road 1754 is located in Donley County. It runs from US 287 at Lelia Lake south to an intersection with County Road W.

On December 3, 1954, FM 1754 was extended south and west 9.2 miles to SH 70. This extension was cancelled on March 26, 1956 in exchange for extending FM 1260 south and east from US 287; much of this extension is now part of County Road W.

== FM 1755 ==
Farm to Market Road 1755
- Location: Donley County
- Length: 2.142 mi (3.447 km)
- Existed: 1951–present

== FM 1756 ==
Farm to Market Road 1756
- Location: Knox County
- Length: 12.314 mi (19.817 km)
- Existed: 1951–present

== FM 1757 ==
Farm to Market Road 1757
- Location: Gaines County
- Length: 24.63 mi (39.64 km)
- Existed: February 19, 1952–present

=== FM 1757 (1951) ===
Farm to Market Road 1757
- Location: Knox County
- Existed: May 23, 1951–February 19, 1952

A previous route numbered FM 1757 was designated on May 23, 1951, from FM 1756, 1.5 miles (2.4 km) west of Truscott, south to a county road. On February 19, 1952, FM 1757 was cancelled in exchange for extending FM 1756 west 1.3 miles (2.1 km) from its previous terminus.

== FM 1758 ==
Farm to Market Road 1758
- Location: Montague County
- Length: 7.6 mi (12.2 km)
- Existed: 1951–present

Farm to Market Road 1758 (FM 1758) is located in Montague County.

FM 1758 begins at an intersection with SH 59 between Bowie and Montague. It travels in a southwesterly direction for 7.6 miles (12.2 km) before state maintenance ends near Salona in unincorporated Montague County.

FM 1758 was designated on May 23, 1951, connecting SH 59 to the community of Salona 5.2 miles (8.4 km) southeast of SH 59. It was extended to its current length on May 7, 1970.

== FM 1759 ==
Farm to Market Road 1759
- Location: Montague County
- Length: 5.516 mi (8.877 km)
- Existed: 1951–present

Farm to Market Road 1759 (FM 1759) is located in Montague County.

FM 1759 begins at an intersection with FM 103 in Nocona, heading west-southwest on two-lane undivided West Pine Street. The road heads through residential areas, curving west and heading between American Legion Park to the north and Nocona Cemetery to the south. The highway turns north and leaves Nocona, then curves to the west and intersects FM 3394. The road turns to the north again before reaching its northern terminus at an intersection with White and Briddy Road, where the road continues north as Gray Road.

FM 1759 was first designated on May 23, 1951, running from FM 103 to an intersection 2.3 miles (3.7 km) to the northwest. The highway was extended 1.6 miles (2.6 km) on November 24, 1959. On May 2, 1967, FM 1759 was extended to its current terminus.

== FM 1760 ==
Farm to Market Road 1760
- Location: Bailey County
- Length: 16.291 mi (26.218 km)
- Existed: 1951–present

== FM 1761 ==
Farm to Market Road 1761
- Location: Willacy County
- Length: 6.901 mi (11.106 km)
- Existed: 1951–present

== FM 1762 ==
Farm to Market Road 1762
- Location: Willacy County
- Length: 6.729 mi (10.829 km)
- Existed: 1951–present

== FM 1763 ==
Farm to Market Road 1763
- Location: Wilbarger County
- Length: 31.867 mi (51.285 km)
- Existed: 1951–present

== FM 1764 ==
Farm to Market Road 1764
- Location: Galveston County
- Length: 13.265 mi (21.348 km)
- Existed: May 23, 1951–present

Farm to Market Road 1764 (FM 1764) is located in Galveston County. It runs from SH 6 in Santa Fe to 14th Street in Texas City. There are brief concurrencies with FM 2004 and I-45.

FM 1764 was designated on May 23, 1951, from the then-new route of US 75 (now I-45) and Camp Wallace Road east to SH 146. On December 17, 1952, the road was extended west 5.3 miles (8.5 km) to SH 6. On November 21, 1956, the road was extended 2.3 miles (3.7 km) east to 14th Street in Texas City. On October 16, 1989, a gap in the route was added at the I-45/FM 2004 intersection. On June 27, 1995, the entire route was redesignated Urban Road 1764 (UR 1764). The designation reverted to FM 1764 with the elimination of the Urban Road system on November 15, 2018.

== FM 1765 ==
Farm to Market Road 1765
- Location: Galveston County
- Length: 7.696 mi (12.386 km)
- Existed: May 23, 1951–present

Farm to Market Road 1765 (FM 1765) is located in Galveston County. It runs from FM 2004 in La Marque to Loop 197 in Texas City. The road is known locally as Texas Avenue.

FM 1765 was designated on May 23, 1951, from SH 6 west of Hitchcock north and east to the then-old route of US 75 (now SH 3). On December 17, 1952, a 1.7-mile (2.7 km) section from SH 6 to FM 2004 was transferred to FM 2004. On November 29, 1990, the road was extended to Loop 197 (now Spur 197), replacing SH 348. On June 27, 1995, the entire route was redesignated Urban Road 1765 (UR 1765). The designation reverted to FM 1765 with the elimination of the Urban Road system on November 15, 2018.

== FM 1766 ==
Farm to Market Road 1766
- Location: Cass County
- Length: 6.639 mi (10.684 km)
- Existed: January 23, 1953–present

=== FM 1766 (1951) ===
Farm to Market Road 1766
- Location: Schleicher County
- Existed: May 23, 1951–January 23, 1953

A previous route numbered FM 1766 was designated on May 23, 1951, from US 277 in Eldorado northwest 8.0 miles (12.9 km) to a road intersection. On November 20, 1951, the road was extended northwest another 6.0 miles (9.7 km). On December 17, 1952, the road was extended northwest 6.2 miles (10.0 km) to the Irion County line. FM 1766 was cancelled on January 23, 1953, and transferred to FM 915.

== FM 1767 ==
Farm to Market Road 1767
- Location: Hale County
- Length: 2.008 mi (3.232 km)
- Existed: September 27, 1960–present

=== FM 1767 (May 1951) ===
Farm to Market Road 1767
- Location: Comanche County
- Existed: August 22, 1951–December 12, 1951

The first use of FM 1767 was in Comanche County, from SH 36, 4 miles (6.4 km) east of Gustine north and west 7.8 miles (12.6 km) via Hazeldell to a road intersection. FM 1767 was cancelled on December 12, 1951, and became a portion of FM 591.

=== FM 1767 (December 1951) ===
Farm to Market Road 1767
- Location: Rains and Wood counties
- Existed: December 18, 1951–December 21, 1959

The second use of FM 1767 was in Rains and Wood counties, from SH 19, 6 miles (9.7 km) north of Emory, east 5.0 miles (8.0 km) to a road intersection. On October 27, 1953, the road was extended east 3.2 miles (5.1 km) to FM 17, replacing FM 2089. FM 1767 was cancelled on December 21, 1959, and transferred to FM 514.

== FM 1768 ==
Farm to Market Road 1768
- Location: Young County
- Length: 11.55 mi (18.59 km)
- Existed: 1951–present

== FM 1769 ==
Farm to Market Road 1769
- Location: Young County
- Length: 22.37 mi (36.00 km)
- Existed: 1951–present

== FM 1770 ==
Farm to Market Road 1770
- Location: Runnels and Coleman counties
- Length: 20.824 mi (33.513 km)
- Existed: 1951–present

== FM 1771 ==
Farm to Market Road 1771
- Location: Falls and Limestone counties
- Length: 12.103 mi (19.478 km)
- Existed: 1951–present

== FM 1772 ==
Farm to Market Road 1772
- Location: Falls County
- Length: 3.7 mi (6.0 km)
- Existed: 1951–present

== RM 1773 ==
Ranch to Market Road 1773
- Location: Menard County
- Length: 12.833 mi (20.653 km)
- Existed: July 25, 1951 (Note: RM 1773 was previously designated as FM 1773 from 1951 to 1959.)–present

It was originally FM 1773 from 1951 to 1959.

=== FM 1773 (1951) ===
Farm to Market Road 1773
- Location: Montgomery County
- Existed: August 22, 1951–September 27, 1951

A previous route numbered FM 1773 was designated on August 22, 1951, from US 59 (now Loop 494) at New Caney east to the Harris County line. This designation was short-lived as FM 1773 became a portion of FM 1485 on September 27, 1951.

== FM 1774 ==
Farm to Market Road 1774
- Location: Grimes, Waller, and Montgomery counties
- Length: 33.308 mi (53.604 km)
- Existed: August 22, 1951–present

Farm to Market Road 1774 (FM 1774) is located in Grimes, Waller, and Montgomery counties. It runs from SH 90 at Anderson to FM 149 at Pinehurst.

FM 1774 was designated on August 22, 1951, from FM 149 at Pinehurst northwest via Magnolia to the Grimes County line. On December 17, 1952, the road was extended northwest 7.7 miles (12.4 km) to SH 105 at Plantersville. On October 27, 1954, the road was extended northwest to SH 90 at Anderson, replacing FM 1369. On May 1, 1963, the route was modified to show a gap at FM 1488. In December 2019 the road was extended south to Woodtrace Boulevard and SH 249, replacing a section of SH 249, but this was modified on June 25, 2020, so that FM 1774 was extended only over the frontage roads from new SH 249 to Woodtrace Boulevard (FM 1774 still replaced the entire section from FM 149 to SH 249) while the main lanes retain the SH 249 designation.

== FM 1775 ==
Farm to Market Road 1775
- Location: Hansford County
- Length: 1.019 mi (1.640 km)
- Existed: 1951–present

== FM 1776 ==
Farm to Market Road 1776
- Location: Ward and Pecos counties
- Length: 43.906 mi (70.660 km)
- Existed: October 25, 1955–present

This route was numbered after November 1.

=== FM 1776 (1951) ===
Farm to Market Road 1776
- Location: San Augustine and Sabine counties
- Existed: September 19, 1951–October 14, 1954

The first use of FM 1776 was in San Augustine and Sabine counties, from SH 21 at Ford's Corner south to SH 184 at Bronson. This was formerly a section of US 96. On October 14, 1954, FM 1776 was cancelled and became a portion of FM 1.

=== FM 1776 (1955) ===
Farm to Market Road 1776
- Location: Grimes County
- Existed: February 17, 1955–November 2, 1955

The next use of FM 1776 was in Grimes County, from FM 149 at Richards southeast 6.2 miles towards Dacus to the Montgomery County line. FM 1776 was cancelled on November 2, 1955 and transferred to FM 1486.

== FM 1777 ==
Farm to Market Road 1777
- Location: Collin County
- Length: 6.025 mi (9.696 km)
- Existed: September 19, 1951–present

Farm to Market Road 1777 (FM 1777) connects the towns of Royse City and Josephine in southeastern Collin County.

FM 1777 begins at an intersection with SH 66 in Royse City and runs through mostly rural farm land before ending at an intersection with FM 6 in Josephine.

FM 1777 was designated on September 19, 1951, running from US 67 (now SH 66) near Royse City northward at a distance of 3.1 miles (5.0 km). The highway was extended 3.3 miles (5.3 km) to FM 6 on April 29, 1952.

== FM 1778 ==
Farm to Market Road 1778
- Location: Collin County
- Length: 4.676 mi (7.525 km)
- Existed: 1951–present

Farm to Market Road 1778 (FM 1778) is located in Collin County.

FM 1778 begins at an intersection with Bus. SH 78 in Copeville near Lavon Lake. The highway runs in an eastern direction and runs along the northern boundary of Nevada where it intersects FM 1138. FM 1778 continues to run east before ending at an intersection with FM 547 near Josephine.

FM 1778 was designated on September 19, 1951, running from SH 78 (now Bus. SH 78) in Copeville to a road intersection at a distance of 3.3 miles (5.3 km). The highway was extended 1.6 miles (2.6 km) to FM 547 on October 31, 1957.

== FM 1779 ==
Farm to Market Road 1779
- Location: Cochran County
- Length: 4.178 mi (6.724 km)
- Existed: 1951–present

== FM 1780 ==
Farm to Market Road 1780
- Location: Gaines, Yoakum, and Cochran counties
- Length: 62.203 mi (Note: The certified length given is shorter than the actual mileage, as the TxDOT description of FM 1780 considers it to be discontinuous at rather than concurrent with SH 114.) (100.106 km)
- Existed: 1951–present

Farm to Market Road 1780 (FM 1780) is located in the South Plains region of West Texas. The highway begins at an intersection with SH 83 just west of Seagraves and runs in a generally north direction, ending at SH 214 in Morton. The highway runs parallel to SH 214, acting as an alternate route to that highway between Denver City and Morton.

The route of FM 1780 is mostly rural, with Whiteface and Morton as the only towns along the highway's route.

FM 1780 begins at an intersection with SH 83 approximately five miles (8.0 km) west of Seagraves. The highway enters Yoakum County just north of here and has intersections with FM 1939 and FM 213. FM 1780 meets U.S. Highway 82/U.S. Route 380 (US 82/US 380) at a stop sign approximately 12 miles (19 km) east of Plains. The highway's next intersection is with FM 2196, entering Cochran County north of here. FM 1780 intersects FM 301 west of Sundown before sharing a brief overlap with FM 1585. The highway meets FM 300 before entering the town of Whiteface. In Morton, FM 1780 serves as the eastern terminus for SH 125 and has a brief overlap with SH 114 along the town's northern boundary. The highway continues to run north before turning west at County Road 245. FM 1780 continues to run in a generally west direction before reaching its northern terminus at SH 214 in Morton.

FM 1780 was first designated on July 25, 1951, running from SH 290 (current SH 114) in Morton to SH 290 (current SH 114) in Whiteface. On October 16, 1951, the west end was changed to SH 214 in Morton. The highway was extended further south along the old route of FM 769 from SH 116 (current SH 114) to FM 301, and on a new route south to FM 2196 on September 21, 1955. On September 27, 1960, FM 1780 was extended south to US 380. On September 15, 1976, FM 1780 was extended further south to its current southern terminus at SH 83, absorbing FM 1544 and parts of FM 1939.

Junction list

County	Location	mi	km	Destinations	Notes
Gaines		0.0	0.0	SH 83 – Seagraves, Denver City	
Yoakum		3.5	5.6	FM 1933 west – Denver City	
Yoakum		5.5	8.9	FM 330 west	
Yoakum		7.5	12.1	FM 213 – Wellman	
Yoakum		16.6	26.7	US 82 / US 380 – Plains, Brownfield	
Yoakum		22.6	36.4	FM 2196	
Cochran		35.7	57.5	FM 301 – Sundown	
Cochran		37.9	61.0	FM 1585 west	South end of FM 1585 overlap
Cochran		38.6	62.1	FM 1585 east	North end of FM 1585 overlap
Cochran		43.3	69.7	FM 300 east – Levelland	
Cochran	Whiteface	45.5	73.2	SH 125 west – Bledsoe	
Cochran	Whiteface	45.8	73.7	SH 114 east – Levelland	South end of SH 114 overlap
Cochran	Whiteface	46.1	74.2	SH 114 west – Morton	North end of SH 114 overlap
Cochran	Morton	62.6	100.7	SH 214 – Plains, Muleshoe	
1.000 mi = 1.609 km; 1.000 km = 0.621 mi: Concurrency terminus

== FM 1781 ==
Farm to Market Road 1781
- Location: Rockport
- Length: 3.3 mi (5.3 km)
- Existed: 1951–present

== FM 1782 ==
Farm to Market Road 1782
- Location: Floyd County
- Length: 2.004 mi (3.225 km)
- Existed: September 27, 1960–present

=== FM 1782 (1951) ===
Farm to Market Road 1782
- Location: Navarro County
- Existed: July 25, 1951–November 28, 1958

A previous route numbered FM 1782 was designated in Navarro County on July 25, 1951, from SH 22 in Blooming Grove northwest 3.4 miles (5.5 km) to a road intersection. FM 1782 was cancelled on November 28, 1958, and transferred to FM 55.

== FM 1783 ==
Farm to Market Road 1783
- Location: Coryell County
- Length: 12.019 mi (19.343 km)
- Existed: November 20, 1951–present

=== FM 1783 (May 1951) ===
Farm to Market Road 1783
- Location: Archer County
- Existed: May 23, 1951–November 20, 1951

A previous route numbered FM 1783 was designated on May 23, 1951, from US 281 at Scotland east 2.9 miles (4.7 km) to the Clay County line. FM 1783 was cancelled on November 20, 1951, and transferred to FM 172.

== FM 1784 ==
Farm to Market Road 1784
- Location: Atascosa County
- Length: 7.359 mi (11.843 km)
- Existed: 1951–present

== FM 1785 ==
Farm to Market Road 1785
- Location: Howard and Borden counties
- Length: 23.353 mi (37.583 km)
- Existed: October 30, 1953–present

=== FM 1785 (1951) ===
Farm to Market Road 1785
- Location: Atascosa County
- Existed: September 19, 1951–November 27, 1953

A previous route numbered FM 1785 was designated on September 19, 1951, from US 281 at Campbellton northeast 5.8 miles (9.3 km) to a road intersection. FM 1785 was cancelled on November 27, 1953, and transferred to FM 791.

== FM 1786 ==
Farm to Market Road 1786
- Location: Milam County
- Length: 1.758 mi (2.829 km)
- Existed: January 18, 1952–present

=== FM 1786 (1951) ===
Farm to Market Road 1786
- Location: Atascosa County
- Existed: September 19, 1951–January 31, 1952

A previous route numbered FM 1786 was designated on September 19, 1951, from FM 140 in Charlotte north to SH 173. FM 1786 was cancelled on January 31, 1952, and transferred to FM 1333.

== FM 1787 ==
Farm to Market Road 1787
- Location: Ector and Midland counties
- Length: 22.033 mi (35.459 km)
- Existed: 1951–present

Farm to Market Road 1787 (FM 1787) is located in rural parts of southern Ector and Midland counties.

FM 1787 begins at an intersection with US 385 near the Pleasant Farms and Nolan Acres subdivisions. The highway travels in a predominately northeast direction and ends at an intersection with SH 349.

FM 1787 was designated on July 25, 1951, running from SH 51 (now US 385) eastward to SH 349 at a distance of 22.0 miles (35.4 km).

Junction list

County	Location	mi	km	Destinations	Notes
Ector		0.0	0.0	US 385 – Odessa, Crane	
Midland		9.9	15.9	RM 1492 south	
Midland		14.0	22.5	FM 1788	
Midland		22.1	35.6	SH 349 – Midland, Rankin	
1.000 mi = 1.609 km; 1.000 km = 0.621 mi

== FM 1788 ==
Farm to Market Road 1788
- Location: Gaines, Andrews, Midland, Ector, and Upton counties
- Length: 74.528 mi (Note: The certified length given is shorter than the actual mileage as the TxDOT description of FM 1788 considers to be discontinuous at rather than concurrent with SH 349.) (119.941 km)
- Existed: 1951–present

Farm to Market Road 1788 (FM 1788) is located in West Texas. It runs from 81.8 miles (131.6 km) south of FM 1787 in Upton County between Midland and Odessa near the Midland International Airport, to US Highway 385 (US 385). FM 1788 carries the La Entrada al Pacifico Corridor from its intersection with Interstate 20 (I-20) to SH 349. FM 1788 is locally known as Telephone Road in Andrews and Gaines counties.

FM 1788 was designated on July 25, 1951, from FM 1787 southward 4.2 miles (6.8 km). On February 24, 1953, FM 1788 was extended north 17.1 miles (27.5 km) to US 80 (now supplanted by I-20). On September 20, 1961, FM 1788 was extended north to SH 158. On May 2, 1962, FM 1788 was extended north to FM 87 (now SH 176). On June 2, 1967, FM 1788 was extended north 13.0 miles (20.9 km) to a road intersection. On January 31, 2008, FM 1788 was extended north along Telephone Road to the Andrews-Gaines county line. On March 25, 2010, FM 1788 was extended north along Telephone Road and west along CR 402 to US 385.

Junction list

County	Location	mi	km	Destinations	Notes
Upton		0.0	0.0	County Road 308	
Midland		4.1	6.6	FM 1787	
Midland		12.2	19.6	FM 3503 west	
Midland		20.3	32.7	I-20 / SH 349 south – Odessa, Midland	I-20 exit 126; south end of SH 349 overlap
Midland		21.4	34.4	I-20 BL – Odessa, Midland	Interchange
Midland		21.9	35.2	Loop 40 north – Midland International Air and Space Port	
Midland		22.2	35.7	Loop 40 south – Midland International Air and Space Port	
Midland		25.2	40.6	SH 191 – Odessa, Midland	
Midland		27.5	44.3	SH 349 north – Lamesa	North end of SH 349 overlap
Midland		30.8	49.6	SH 158 – Kermit, Midland	
Ector	No major junctions				
Andrews		51.4	82.7	SH 176 – Andrews, Big Spring	
Andrews		55.7	89.6	SH 115 – Andrews, Patricia	Interchange
Gaines		81.8	131.6	US 385 – Andrews, Seminole	
1.000 mi = 1.609 km; 1.000 km = 0.621 mi: Concurrency terminus

== FM 1789 ==
Farm to Market Road 1789
- Location: Baylor County
- Length: 3.043 mi (4.897 km)
- Existed: 1951–present

== FM 1790 ==
Farm to Market Road 1790
- Location: Baylor County
- Length: 10.76 mi (17.32 km)
- Existed: September 18, 1951–present

Farm to Market Road 1790 (FM 1790) is located in Baylor County. Its southern terminus is at SH 114 southeast of Seymour. It runs to the north, meeting FM 2180 at that route's eastern terminus, before intersecting with FM 422. The two routes briefly run concurrently to the west before FM 1790 resumes its northward routing, reaching its northern terminus at US 82/US 183/US 277/US 283.

FM 1790 was designated on September 18, 1951, from Mabelle to FM 422. It was extended to SH 114 (then SH 199) on October 18, 1954, replacing FM 1874.

== FM 1791 ==
Farm to Market Road 1791
- Location: Walker and Montgomery counties
- Length: 18.142 mi (29.197 km)
- Existed: 1951–present

== FM 1792 ==
Farm to Market Road 1792
- Location: Cameron County
- Existed: May 22, 1951–August 29, 1990

Farm to Market Road 1792 (FM 1792) was located in Cameron County. No highway currently uses the FM 1792 designation.

FM 1792 was designated on May 22, 1951, running from SH 48 northeast of Brownsville to a road intersection at a distance of 1.92 miles (3.09 km). The highway was extended 13.9 miles (22.4 km) to SH 100 at Port Isabel on November 20, 1951. On February 28, 1973, FM 1792 was signed (but not designated) as SH 48. FM 1792 was cancelled on August 29, 1990, as the SH 48 designation became official.

== FM 1793 ==
Farm to Market Road 1793
- Location: Harrison County
- Length: 10.126 mi (16.296 km)
- Existed: 1951–present

== FM 1794 ==
Farm to Market Road 1794
- Location: Panola County
- Length: 18.806 mi (30.265 km)
- Existed: November 20, 1951–present

Farm to Market Road 1794 (FM 1794) is located in Panola County. It runs from FM 959 east of Tatum to FM 31 in DeBerry.

FM 1794 was designated on November 20, 1951, from FM 959 east to US 59, 8.1 miles (13.0 km) north of Carthage. On June 1, 1965, it was extended west 4.8 miles (7.7 km) to SH 43 in Tatum. On November 24, 1970, FM 1794 was extended east along a portion of old US 59 to FM 1186 and onward to FM 31 in DeBerry, replacing FM 2792. FM 1794 was truncated to FM 959 on April 30, 2015; the 4.3-mile (6.9 km) section from FM 959 to SH 43 was removed from the highway system and transferred to private ownership.

== FM 1795 ==
Farm to Market Road 1795
- Location: Wood and Upshur counties
- Length: 15.068 mi (24.250 km)
- Existed: 1951–present

== FM 1796 ==
Farm to Market Road 1796
- Location: Uvalde and Medina counties
- Length: 21.521 mi (34.635 km)
- Existed: December 18, 1951–present

=== FM 1796 (November 1951) ===
Farm to Market Road 1796
- Location: Parmer County
- Existed: November 20, 1951–January 14, 1952

A previous route numbered FM 1796 was designated on November 20, 1951, from US 60 at Bovina north 9.0 miles (14.5 km) to a road intersection. FM 1796 was cancelled on January 14, 1952, and transferred to FM 1731.

== FM 1797 ==
Farm to Market Road 1797
- Location: Rusk County
- Length: 6.656 mi (10.712 km)
- Existed: 1951–present

== FM 1798 ==
Farm to Market Road 1798
- Location: Rusk County
- Length: 31.331 mi (50.422 km)
- Existed: November 20, 1951–present

Farm to Market Road 1798 (FM 1798) is a 31.3-mile (50.4 km) route in Rusk County that connects US 79 and SH 42 south of Price with US 79 east of Henderson, forming a large southern loop off of US 79 that bypasses Henderson.

== FM 1799 ==
Farm to Market Road 1799
- Location: Wood County
- Length: 4.464 mi (7.184 km)
- Existed: 1951–present
