= List of Farm to Market Roads in Texas (2300–2399) =

- Texas Farm to Market Road and Ranch to Market Road markers

Highway names
- Interstates: Interstate Highway X (IH-X, I-X)
- US Highways: U.S. Highway X (US X)
- State: State Highway X (SH X)
- Loops: Loop X
- Spurs: Spur X
- Recreational: Recreational Road X (RE X)
- Farm or Ranch to Market Roads: Farm to Market Road X (FM X); Ranch to Market Road X (RM X)
- Park Roads: Park Road X (PR X)

System links
- Highways in Texas; Interstate; US; State; Former; Toll; Loops; Spurs; FM/RM; Park; Rec

Farm to Market Roads in Texas are owned and maintained by the Texas Department of Transportation (TxDOT).

== FM 2300 ==
Farm to Market Road 2300
- Location: Carson and Gray counties
- Length: 23.395 mi (37.651 km)
- Existed: 1954–present

Farm to Market Road 2300 (FM 2300) is located in Carson and Gray counties.

The southern terminus of FM 2300 is at Business I-40 in Groom in Carson County. The highway travels north along Eastern Avenue and has a junction with I-40 before leaving the town. FM 2300 continues north before turning east at County Road 168. It enters Gray County and turns back north at Ollinger Road. FM 2300 crosses FM 293 before reaching its northern terminus at US 60 southeast of Pampa.

FM 2300 was designated on October 26, 1954, from US 60 southward to FM 292 (current FM 293) at a distance of 11.4 miles (18.3 km). The designation was extended to US 66 (now Business I-40) on June 28, 1963.

Junction list

County	Location	mi	km	Destinations	Notes
Carson	Groom	0.0	0.0	I-40 BL (Front Street)	Former US 66
Carson	Groom	0.7	1.1	I-40 – Amarillo, Shamrock	I-40 exit 113
Gray		11.8	19.0	FM 293 – Panhandle	
Gray		23.4	37.7	US 60 – Panhandle, Pampa	
1.000 mi = 1.609 km; 1.000 km = 0.621 mi

== FM 2301 ==
Farm to Market Road 2301
- Location: Floyd, Swisher, and Armstrong counties
- Length: 47.816 mi (76.952 km)
- Existed: 1954–present

Farm to Market Road 2301 (FM 2301) is located in Floyd, Swisher, and Armstrong counties.

FM 2301 begins at an intersection with US 70 near Aiken. The highway travels in a northern direction through rural areas of Floyd County, intersecting FM 2286 and FM 788. FM 2301 enters Swisher County and turns west at County Road 27 and turns back north at an intersection with FM 1612. The highway ends at an intersection with FM 285 south of Wayside. FM 2301 travels through entirely rural areas of the South Plains and Panhandle regions and does not travel through any towns, except for the unincorporated community of Claytonville.

FM 2301 was designated on October 26, 1954, running from FM 788 southward to US 70 in Aiken at a distance of 8.1 miles (13.0 km) over an old routing of FM 788. The highway was extended 7.5 miles (12.1 km) northward and westward to FM 1612 on October 31, 1957. FM 2301 was extended northward to FM 285 on June 2, 1967; this last extension replaced parts of FM 1612 and FM 1318 and all of FM 2398.

Junction list

County	Location	mi	km	Destinations	Notes
Floyd		0.0	0.0	US 70 – Plainview, Floydada	
Floyd		3.1	5.0	FM 1782 west – Plainview	
Floyd		4.1	6.6	FM 2286 – Plainview	
Floyd		8.1	13.0	FM 788	
Swisher		15.0	24.1	FM 1612 south	
Swisher	Claytonville	19.1	30.7	FM 145	
Swisher		26.2	42.2	SH 86 – Tulia, Silverton	
Swisher		30.5	49.1	FM 1318 west – Tulia	
Swisher		36.0	57.9	FM 3300 east	
Swisher		39.9	64.2	FM 146 – Tulia, Vigo Park	
Armstrong		46.9	75.5	FM 1075 west – Happy	
Armstrong		47.8	76.9	FM 285 – Wayside	
1.000 mi = 1.609 km; 1.000 km = 0.621 mi

== FM 2302 ==
Farm to Market Road 2302
- Location: Coleman County
- Length: 2.035 mi (3.275 km)
- Existed: 1954–present

Farm to Market Road 2302 (FM 2302) is located in Coleman County.

FM 2302 begins at an intersection with SH 206 northeast of Coleman. The highway travels in an eastern direction before ending at an intersection with FM 1176.

FM 2302 was designated on December 17. 1954, running from SH 206 northeast of Coleman, eastward to Cross Roads and northward to SH 206 at a distance of 4.0 miles (6.4 km). The section of highway from Cross Roads northward to SH 206 was transferred to FM 1176 on June 26, 1967.

== FM 2303 ==
Farm to Market Road 2303
- Location: Erath County
- Length: 7.594 mi (12.221 km)
- Existed: October 31, 1958–present

Farm to Market Road 2303 (FM 2303) is located in Erath County.

FM 2303 begins at an intersection with SH 108 just outside of the Stephenville city limits. The highway travels in a northwest direction and intersects FM 3025 before ending at an intersection with FM 219.

FM 2303 was designated on October 31, 1958, running from SH 108 northwestward at a distance of 4.2 miles (6.8 km). The highway was extended 3.5 miles (5.6 km) to FM 219 on June 28, 1963.

=== FM 2303 (1955) ===
Farm to Market Road 2303
- Location: Grayson and Fannin counties
- Existed: 1955–1955

A previous route numbered FM 2303 was designated on January 26, 1955, from Whitewright east to Randolph. This became part of FM 1281 shortly after designation.

== FM 2304 ==
Farm to Market Road 2304
- Location: Travis County
- Length: 4.537 mi (7.302 km)
- Existed: September 27, 1960–present

Farm to Market Road 2304 (FM 2304) is located in Travis County.

FM 2304 begins at an intersection with FM 1626 in Manchaca. The highway travels along Manchaca Road and passes near several subdivisions in southern Austin before state maintenance ends at an intersection with Matthews Lane just south of William Cannon Drive.

The current FM 2304 was designated on September 27, 1960, running from FM 1626 in Manchaca northeastward to 0.8 miles (1.3 km) south of Loop 293 (now US 290) at a distance of 6.2 miles (10.0 km). The northern terminus was relocated to Matthews Lane on June 25, 1962, decreasing the highway's length by 1.5 miles (2.4 km). The route was redesignated Urban Road 2304 (UR 2304) on June 27, 1995. The designation reverted to FM 2304 with the elimination of the Urban Road system on November 15, 2018.

=== FM 2304 (planned 1955) ===
Farm to Market Road 2304
- Location: Bell County
- Existed: July 28, 1955–1955

The first route numbered FM 2304 was planned in Bell County on July 28, 1955, from SH 36 at Temple, westward to SH 317 north of Belton. This FM 2304 may not have been designated, as it was shown in the logs as part of an extended FM 2305.

=== FM 2304 (1956) ===
Farm to Market Road 2304
- Location: Jasper and Tyler counties
- Existed: August 17, 1956–December 1, 1958

The second route numbered FM 2304 was designated on August 17, 1956, running from FM 1005 near Mount Union westward toward Sheffield's Ferry at a distance of 2.2 miles (3.5 km). The highway was extended 2.2 miles (3.5 km) to the Neches River later that year on November 21. FM 2304 was extended 0.1 miles (0.16 km) across the river On October 31, 1957. The road was extended west of FM 92 at Spurger on October 31, 1958. The highway was cancelled on December 1, 1958, with the mileage being transferred to FM 1013.

== FM 2305 ==
Farm to Market Road 2305
- Location: Bell County
- Length: 8.392 mi (13.506 km)
- Existed: 1955–present

Farm to Market Road 2305 (FM 2305) is located in Bell County in the Killeen–Temple–Fort Hood metropolitan area.

FM 2305 begins at Belton Lake in the Woodland area. The highway enters the Temple city limits near an intersection with FM 2271 / Morgan's Point Road. FM 2305 travels through Temple along Adams Avenue and has interchanges with SH 317 and SH 36 / Loop 363 before ending at SH 53 just west of I-35.

FM 2305 was designated on July 28, 1955, along the current route; the portion east of SH 217 was originally planned as FM 2304. The section of highway between SH 317 and SH 53 was redesignated Urban Road 2305 (UR 2305) on June 27, 1995. The designation of that section reverted to FM 2305 with the elimination of the Urban Road system on November 15, 2018.

Junction list

The entire route is in Bell County.

Location	mi	km	Destinations	Notes
	0.0	0.0	Belton Lake	
Temple	1.8	2.9	FM 2271 south / Morgan's Point Road – Belton Lake	
Temple	3.2	5.1	SH 317 – Belton, McGregor	Interchange
Temple	6.5– 6.9	10.5– 11.1	SH 36 / Loop 363 (H.K. Dodgen Loop)	Interchange
Temple	8.3	13.4	SH 53 (Airport Road) to I-35	
1.000 mi = 1.609 km; 1.000 km = 0.621 mi

== FM 2306 ==
Farm to Market Road 2306
- Location: Hockley County
- Length: 5.505 mi (8.859 km)
- Existed: October 31, 1957–present

Farm to Market Road 2306 (FM 2306) is located in Hockley County.

FM 2306 begins at an intersection with Hartford Road northwest of Levelland. The highway travels in an eastern direction and intersects FM 1490 before ending at US 385.

The current FM 2306 was designated on October 31, 1957, along the current route.

=== FM 2306 (1955) ===
Farm to Market Road 2306
- Location: Coryell County
- Existed: July 28, 1955–December 13, 1956

A previous route numbered FM 2306 was designated on July 28, 1955, running from US 84 east of Evant, southward at a distance of 3.0 miles (4.8 km). The highway was cancelled on December 21, 1956, with the mileage being transferred to FM 183.

== FM 2307 ==
Farm to Market Road 2307
- Location: Falls County
- Length: 4.834 mi (7.780 km)
- Existed: 1955–present

Farm to Market Road 2307 (FM 2307) is located in Falls County.

FM 2307 begins at an intersection with SH 6 about 5.0 miles (8.0 km) north of Marlin. The highway travels in a northeast direction through rural farmland and intersects FM 3375. State maintenance ends at an intersection with County Road 153, with the road continuing as County Road 152.

FM 2307 was designated on July 28, 1955, along the current route.

== FM 2308 ==
Farm to Market Road 2308
- Location: Falls County
- Length: 0.381 mi (613 m)
- Existed: 1955–present

Farm to Market Road 2308 (FM 2308) is located in Falls County in the city of Marlin. Running at a length of just under 0.4 miles (0.64 km), FM 2308 is one of the shortest highways in Texas.

FM 2308 begins at an intersection with Bus. SH 6. The highway travels in a southeastern direction, running between two small lakes, before ending at an intersection with FM 147.

FM 2308 was designated on July 28, 1955, along the current route.

== FM 2309 ==
Farm to Market Road 2309
- Location: McCulloch County
- Length: 4.247 mi (6.835 km)
- Existed: April 30, 1959–present

Farm to Market Road 2309 (FM 2309) is located in McCulloch County.

FM 2309 begins at an intersection with SH 71 southeast of Brady. The highway travels in a northwestern direction through rural areas and passes many farms before entering Brady. FM 2309 turns north onto A.L. Reed Street near Willie Washington Park then turns west onto 11th Street. The highway continues to travel along 11th Street and ends at an intersection with US 87/US 190/US 377.

The current FM 2309 was designated on April 30, 1959, along an old routing of FM 734.

=== FM 2309 (1955) ===
Farm to Market Road 2309
- Location: Hamilton County
- Existed: July 28, 1955–November 26, 1958

FM 2309 was originally designated on July 28, 1955, in Hamilton County from FM 218 at Indian Gap to the Comanche county line at a distance of 4.2 miles (6.8 km). The highway was cancelled on November 26, 1958, with the mileage being transferred to FM 591. This portion of FM 591 was later transferred to FM 1702.

== FM 2310 ==
Farm to Market Road 2310
- Location: Limestone County
- Length: 5.792 mi (9.321 km)
- Existed: 1955–present

Farm to Market Road 2310 (FM 2310) is located in Limestone County.

FM 2310 begins at an intersection with US 84 near Lake Mexia. The highway travels in a northwestern direction through rural farm lands passes by or near the towns of Echols and Sandy. FM 2310 ends at an intersection with FM 73 near Coolidge.

FM 2310 was designated on July 28, 1955, along the current route.

== FM 2311 ==
Farm to Market Road 2311
- Location: McLennan County
- Length: 12.158 mi (19.566 km)
- Existed: 1955–present

Farm to Market Road 2311 (FM 2311) is located in McLennan County.

FM 2311 begins at an intersection with SH 31 near Axtell. The highway travels in a northwestern direction through rural farm areas near several wetlands and travels through Leroy, where it intersects FM 308. The highway turns southwest at Tours before turning northwest at an intersection with FM 3149. FM 2311 next then enters West, where it briefly travels along Oak Street before ending at an intersection with FM 2114.

FM 2311 was designated on July 28, 1955, traveling from FM 2114 at West to FM 308 at Leroy at a distance of 7.0 miles (11.3 km). The highway was extended southeastward 5.1 miles (8.2 km) to its current southern terminus at SH 31 on June 28, 1963.

Junction list

The entire route is in McLennan County.

Location	mi	km	Destinations	Notes
	0.0	0.0	SH 31 – Waco, Hubbard	
Leroy	5.1	8.2	FM 308 – Elm Mott, Birome	
	8.2	13.2	FM 3149 west to I-35 – Ross	
West	12.2	19.6	FM 2114 (Oak Street) – Cottonwood, Penelope, Hubbard	
1.000 mi = 1.609 km; 1.000 km = 0.621 mi

== FM 2312 ==
Farm to Market Road 2312
- Location: Shackelford County
- Length: 5.055 mi (8.135 km)
- Existed: July 28, 1955–present

Farm to Market Road 2312 (FM 2312) is located in Shackelford County.

FM 2312 begins at intersection with FM 576 west of Moran. The highway travels in a northern direction through rural areas before ending at an intersection with SH 6.

FM 2312 was designated on July 28, 1955, along the current route.

== FM 2313 ==
Farm to Market Road 2313
- Location: Lampasas County
- Length: 6.003 mi (9.661 km)
- Existed: 1955–present

Farm to Market Road 2313 (FM 2313) is located in Lampasas County.

FM 2313 begins at an intersection with US 190 in Kempner. The highway travels out in a northeast direction and turns northwest at County Road 3300. FM 2313 turns west at County Road 3220 and crosses the Lampasas River before ending at an intersection with FM 580.

FM 2313 was designated on July 28, 1955, running from US 190 northwestward to a road intersection at a distance of 4.0 miles (6.4 km). The highway was extended 2.3 miles (3.7 km) northwestward and westward to FM 580 on June 27, 1960.

== FM 2314 ==
Farm to Market Road 2314
- Location: Lavaca County
- Length: 6.127 mi (9.860 km)
- Existed: 1955–present

Farm to Market Road 2314 (FM 2314) is located in Lavaca County.

FM 2314 begins at an intersection with US 90 Alt. on the eastern edge of Hallettsville. The highway begins traveling in a generally northern direction before turning northeast and running through rural farm areas. State maintenance ends at County Road 138 near Vsetin.

FM 2314 was designated on July 28, 1955, along the current route.

== FM 2315 ==
Farm to Market Road 2315
- Location: McCulloch County
- Length: 5.98 mi (9.62 km)
- Existed: 1955–present

== FM 2316 ==
Farm to Market Road 2316
- Location: El Paso County
- Length: 2.515 mi (4.048 km)
- Existed: 1955–present

Farm to Market Road 2316 (FM 2316) is located in El Paso County in the city of El Paso.

FM 2316 begins at I-10 near a retail center, with the road continuing past I-10 as Giles Road. The highway travels along McRae Boulevard in a suburban area of the city. FM 2316 ends at an intersection with US 62/US 180 near El Paso International Airport.

FM 2316 was designated on July 28, 1955, along the current route. The route was redesignated Urban Road 2316 (UR 2316) on June 27, 1995. The designation reverted to FM 2316 with the elimination of the Urban Road system on November 15, 2018.

== RM 2317 ==
Ranch to Market Road 2317
- Location: Hudspeth County
- Length: 12.303 mi (19.800 km)
- Existed: October 27, 1959–present

Ranch to Market Road 2317 (RM 2317) is located in Hudspeth County.

RM 2317 runs from US 62/US 180 near Cornudas southward and then eastward before ending at RM 1111.

RM 2317 was originally designated as Farm to Market Road 2317 (FM 2317) on July 28, 1955, from US 62 southward to Hueco Gas Pump Station. The route was redesignated RM 2317 on October 27, 1959. It was extended to the west to RM 1111 on May 2, 1962.

== FM 2318 ==
Farm to Market Road 2318
- Location: Comanche County
- Length: 14.372 mi (23.129 km)
- Existed: October 28, 1960–present

=== FM 2318 (Bosque County) ===
Farm to Market Road 2318
- Location: Bosque County
- Existed: July 28, 1955–November 26, 1958

=== FM 2318 (Hudspeth County) ===
Farm to Market Road 2318
- Location: Hudspeth County
- Existed: July 28, 1955–September 18, 1957

== FM 2319 ==
Farm to Market Road 2319
- Location: Mitchell and Nolan counties
- Length: 18.075 mi (29.089 km)
- Existed: October 31, 1958–present

=== FM 2319 (1955) ===
Farm to Market Road 2319
- Location: Collin County
- Existed: September 1, 1955–September 27, 1957

A previous route numbered FM 2319 was designated on September 1, 1955, from SH 121 southwest of McKinney, south and east 2.3 miles (3.7 km) to new US 75, 1 mile (1.6 km) west of Wetsel. This was formerly a portion of FM 2170 before it was rerouted to run east of US 75 (the remaining 2 miles of this section were removed altogether). FM 2319 was cancelled on September 27, 1957, in exchange for extending FM 2448 (later FM 2478).

== FM 2320 ==
Farm to Market Road 2320
- Location: Kent County
- Length: 14.783 mi (23.791 km)
- Existed: September 20, 1961–present

=== FM 2320 (1955) ===
Farm to Market Road 2320
- Location: Fannin and Hunt counties
- Existed: August 24, 1955–December 5, 1958

A previous route numbered FM 2320 was designated on August 24, 1955, from Commerce, northwest 14.0 miles (22.5 km) to the Fannin County line at Wolfe City. On November 21, 1956, the road was extended northwest 6.1 miles (9.8 km) to Bailey. FM 2320 was cancelled (along with FM 2321) on December 5, 1958, and transferred to FM 1281 (now SH 11).

== FM 2321 ==
Farm to Market Road 2321
- Location: Clay County
- Length: 3.998 mi (6.434 km)
- Existed: September 20, 1961–present

Farm to Market Road 2321 (FM 2321) is located in Clay County.

FM 2321 begins at the intersection of Friendship Road and Spikes Road. The highway travels in an eastern direction through rural farming and ranching areas before ending at an intersection with FM 1288 south of Bellevue.

The current FM 2321 was designated on September 20, 1961, running from FM 1288 westward to a road intersection.

=== FM 2321 (1955) ===
Farm to Market Road 2321
- Location: Grayson County
- Existed: August 24, 1955–December 5, 1958

A previous route numbered FM 2321 was designated on August 24, 1955, from US 75 near Sherman southeast 10.3 miles (16.6 km) to Tom Bean. On July 15, 1957, the northern terminus was relocated to FM 697, shortening the route by 0.5 miles (0.80 km). FM 2321 was cancelled (along with FM 2320) on December 5, 1958, and transferred to FM 1281 (now SH 11).

== RM 2322 ==
Ranch to Market Road 2322
- Location: Travis County
- Length: 4.588 mi (7.384 km)
- Existed: 1955–present

Ranch to Market Road 2322 (RM 2322) is a 4.6-mile (7.4 km) route located in Travis County.

RM 2322 was designated on August 24, 1955, but it terminated at Lake Travis within the current boundary of Pace Bend Park; the terminus was moved to the park boundary on April 28, 1983.

RM 2322 begins at an intersection with SH 71 in west Travis County, between Bee Cave and Spicewood. It proceeds northwest along Pace Bend Road for 4.6 miles (7.4 km), following the shoreline of several branches of Lake Travis. RM 2322 passes through the village of Briarcliff before terminating at the entrance to Pace Bend Park, an LCRA-maintained park.

== RM 2323 ==
Ranch to Market Road 2323
- Location: Llano and Gillespie counties
- Length: 33.268 mi (53.540 km)
- Existed: October 31, 1957–present

Ranch to Market Road 2323 (RM 2323) is located in Llano and Gillespie counties in the Texas Hill Country.

RM 2323 begins at an intersection with US 87 northwest of Fredericksburg. The highway travels through rural, hilly terrain for most of its length before entering Llano, where RM 2323 ends at an intersection with SH 16.

RM 2323 was designated in October 31, 1957, running from SH 16 at Llano to a county road at a distance of 7.9 miles (12.7 km). The highway was extended 11.3 miles (18.2 km) southwestward to Prairie Mountain on October 31, 1958. RM 2323 was extended 9.1 miles (14.6 km) to US 87 on June 28, 1963, with 6.5 miles (10.5 km) of the extension coming from RM 2767.

=== FM 2323 (1955) ===
Farm to Market Road 2323
- Location: Palo Pinto County
- Existed: August 24, 1955–December 19, 1955

FM 2323 was originally designated on August 24, 1955, from US 281 north of Mineral Wells east and south to US 180 in Mineral Wells. This route was cancelled on December 19, 1955 in exchange for extending FM 1194 (now FM 4) to FM 4. The route was restored as FM 2456 in 1956.

== FM 2324 ==
Farm to Market Road 2324
- Location: Rains County
- Length: 5.769 mi (9.284 km)
- Existed: 1955–present

== RM 2325 ==
Ranch to Market Road 2325
- Location: Hays and Blanco counties
- Length: 15.692 mi (25.254 km)
- Existed: August 24, 1955–present

This was erroneously shown in the designation file as FM 2325 for 1956-1960.

== FM 2326 ==
Farm to Market Road 2326
- Location: Wilbarger and Wichita counties
- Length: 11.063 mi (17.804 km)
- Existed: 1955–present

== FM 2327 ==
Farm to Market Road 2327
- Location: Cass County
- Length: 6.071 mi (9.770 km)
- Existed: 1955–present

== FM 2328 ==
Farm to Market Road 2328
- Location: Cass County
- Length: 5.825 mi (9.374 km)
- Existed: 1955–present

== RM 2329 ==
Ranch to Market Road 2329
- Location: Henderson County
- Length: 7.124 mi (11.465 km)
- Existed: August 24, 1955 (Note: RM 2329 was originally designated as FM 2329 from 1955 to 1959.)–present

Ranch to Market Road 2329 (RM 2329) is located in Henderson County.

RM 2329 begins at an intersection with FM 316 south of Eustace. The highway travels south before turning east near Cedar Creek Reservoir and an intersection with RM 3054. RM 2329 continues east before ending at US 175 in Pickens.

RM 2329 was designated on August 24, 1955, as Farm to Market Road 2329 (FM 2329), along the current route. The designation was changed to RM 2329 on October 29, 1959.

== FM 2330 ==
Farm to Market Road 2330
- Location: Anderson County
- Length: 7.195 mi (11.579 km)
- Existed: 1955–present

== FM 2331 ==
Farm to Market Road 2331
- Location: Johnson County
- Length: 18.336 mi (Note: The certified length given is shorter than the actual mileage, as the Texas Department of Transportation description of FM 2331 considers it to be discontinuous at rather than concurrent with FM 4 and SH 171.) (29.509 km)
- Existed: 1955–present

Farm to Market Road 2331 (FM 2331) is located in Johnson County.

FM 2331 begins at an intersection with US 67 southwest of Cleburne. The highway starts out traveling in a northwest direction, running through the town of Bono and turns north before beginning an overlap with FM 4. After leaving the overlap with FM 4, FM 2331 continues to run in a northern direction and starts to turn to the east at County Road 1231 before running in a more northern direction at County Road 1229. After the intersection with County Road 1229, the highway enters Godley and has an overlap with SH 171 through the town. FM 2331 leaves Godley and runs in a mostly northern direction and ends at the Tarrant county line; the road continues as Winscott Plover Road to FM 1187.

FM 2331 was designated on June 26, 1955, running from FM 1192 southeastward to US 67 at a distance of 6.5 miles (10.5 km). The highway was extended 4.9 miles (7.9 km) to SH 171 on July 11, 1968, creating an overlap with FM 1192. FM 2331 was extended 8.7 miles (14.0 km) to the Tarrant County line on December 20, 1984, replacing FM 2435; at the same time, FM 1192 became part of FM 208, which became part of FM 4 two months later.

Junction list

The entire route is in Johnson County.

Location	mi	km	Destinations	Notes
	0.0	0.0	US 67 – Glen Rose, Cleburne	
	5.8	9.3	FM 4 south – Cleburne	South end of FM 4 overlap
	6.6	10.6	FM 4 north – Granbury	North end of FM 4 overlap
Godley	10.9	17.5	SH 171 south – Cleburne	South end of SH 171 overlap
Godley	11.2	18.0	FM 917 east – Joshua	
Godley	11.5	18.5	SH 171 north – Cresson, Weatherford	North end of SH 171 overlap
	19.8	31.9	Winscott Plover Road	
1.000 mi = 1.609 km; 1.000 km = 0.621 mi: Concurrency terminus

== FM 2332 ==
Farm to Market Road 2332
- Location: Clay County
- Length: 26.207 mi (42.176 km)
- Existed: October 31, 1958–present

Farm to Market Road 2332 (FM 2332) is located in Clay County.

FM 2332 begins at an intersection with SH 148 south of Petrolia. A two-lane roadway for its entire length, it travels eastward before curving to the south to intersect FM 1197 northeast of Hurnville. Resuming an eastward direction, FM 2332 then intersects FM 171. Near the Red River and the Oklahoma state line, the highway turns to the south; near where it crosses the Little Wichita River, the roadway is within 0.2 miles (0.3 km) of Jefferson County, Oklahoma. The route parallels the Montague County line before reaching its eastern terminus at US 82 west of Ringgold.

The current FM 2332 was designated on October 31, 1958, from its current western terminus at SH 148 near Petrolia to FM 1197. The route was extended to its current length on September 27, 1960, when the eastern extension of FM 1197 and the mileage of the original FM 2535 became part of this route.

Junction list

The entire route is in Clay County.

Location	mi	km	Destinations	Notes
	0.0	0.0	SH 148 – Petrolia	Western terminus
	5.6	9.0	FM 1197 – Henrietta	
	7.4	11.9	FM 171 – Byers	
	26.2	42.2	US 82 – Henrietta, Ringgold	Eastern terminus
1.000 mi = 1.609 km; 1.000 km = 0.621 mi

=== FM 2332 (1955) ===
Farm to Market Road 2332
- Location: Travis County
- Existed: August 24, 1955–May 23, 1956

A previous route numbered FM 2332 was designated on August 24, 1955, from Loop 212 in Manor south 7 miles (11 km) to FM 969. FM 2332 was cancelled on May 23, 1956, and removed from the state highway system; the funds originally set aside for FM 2332 were instead used to construct RM 2244. The route became part of FM 973 on October 31, 1957.

== FM 2333 ==
Farm to Market Road 2333
- Location: Runnels and Coke counties
- Length: 14.26 mi (22.95 km)
- Existed: 1955–present

== FM 2334 ==
Farm to Market Road 2334
- Location: Tom Green County
- Length: 7.096 mi (11.420 km)
- Existed: 1955–present

== FM 2335 ==
Farm to Market Road 2335
- Location: Tom Green County
- Length: 16.256 mi (26.161 km)
- Existed: 1955–present

== FM 2336 ==
Farm to Market Road 2336
- Location: Bastrop County
- Length: 6.799 mi (10.942 km)
- Existed: 1955–present

Farm to Market Road 2336 (FM 2336) is a 6.799-mile (10.942 km) state road in Bastrop County, that connects Texas State Highway 95 on the northeast corner of Camp Swift with U.S. Route 290 and Texas State Highway Loop 223 in McDade.

== FM 2337 ==
Farm to Market Road 2337
- Location: Hale County
- Length: 3.853 mi (6.201 km)
- Existed: February 27, 1958–present

=== RM 2337 ===
Ranch to Market Road 2337
- Location: Llano County
- Existed: August 24, 1955–August 30, 1957

RM 2337 was designated on August 24, 1955 from RM 2241 at New Bluffton north 6 miles to Tow. RM 2337 was cancelled on August 30, 1957 and transferred to RM 2241, so that there was one continuous RM road, rather than two, from Llano to Tow.

== RM 2338 ==
Ranch to Market Road 2338
- Location: Williamson County
- Length: 8.753 mi (14.087 km)
- Existed: August 24, 1955 (Note: RM 2338 was originally designated as FM 2338 from 1955 to 1956.)–present

Ranch to Market Road 2338 (RM 2338) is located in Williamson County. The western terminus of RM 2338 is at FM 970 in Andice. It runs along Andice Road, and in Sun City, the road name changes to Williams Drive. The eastern end of RM 2338 is at FM 3405. Past this point, the roadway continues under county maintenance.

RM 2338 was designated on August 24, 1955, as Farm to Market Road 2338 (FM 2338), running from FM 970 in Andice to US 81 in Georgetown. The designation was changed to RM 2338 on October 1, 1956. On September 25, 2008, the section of highway within the city of Georgetown was removed from the state highway system.

== FM 2339 ==
Farm to Market Road 2339
- Location: Van Zandt County
- Length: 11.266 mi (18.131 km)
- Existed: 1955–present

Farm to Market Road 2339 (FM 2339) is located in Van Zandt County.

FM 2339 begins at an intersection with FM 1861 south of Martin's Mill. Just east of FM 773, the highway passes near Callender Lake and a rural subdivision. FM 2339 enters Edom and ends at an intersection with FM 279.

FM 2339 was designated on October 25, 1955, running from FM 279 at Edom westward to FM 773 at a distance of 7.2 miles (11.6 km). The highway was extended 4.4 miles (7.1 km) to FM 1861 on October 31, 1957.

=== RM 2339 (planned 1955) ===
Farm to Market Road 2339
- Location: Burnet County
- Existed: August 24, 1955–August 24, 1955

This RM 2339 was planned to run from US 281 in Round Mountain northwest to SH 71. This became part of RM 962 instead in the final numbering plans.

== RM 2340 ==
Ranch to Market Road 2340
- Location: Burnet County
- Length: 7.565 mi (12.175 km)
- Existed: August 24, 1955–present

Ranch to Market Road 2340 (RM 2340) is located in Burnet County.

RM 2340 begins at an intersection with RM 963 northeast of Burnet. The highway travels in a generally northern direction and turns to the west in Lake Victor. RM 2340 travels in a southwestern direction from Lake Victor and ends at an intersection with US 281 roughly halfway between Burnet and Lampasas.

RM 2340 was designated on August 24, 1955, along the current route.

== RM 2341 ==
Ranch to Market Road 2341
- Location: Burnet County
- Length: 15.025 mi (24.180 km)
- Existed: August 24, 1955–present

Ranch to Market Road 2341 (RM 2341) is located in Burnet County.

RM 2341 begins at an intersection with SH 29 west of Burnet. The highway travels in a generally northern direction and turns west near South Fork Morgan Creek near the northeastern point of Lake Buchanan. RM 2341 runs parallel to the lake's northern shore before ending at the main entrance to Canyon of the Eagles Nature Park.

RM 2341 was designated on August 24, 1955, running from SH 29 northwestward at a distance of 3.6 miles (5.8 km). The highway was extended 8.0 miles (12.9 km) northwestward to a point 0.9 miles (1.4 km) northwest of White Bluff on November 24, 1959. RM 2341 was extended 5.0 miles (8.0 km) northwestward on June 1, 1965.

== RM 2342 ==
Ranch to Market Road 2342
- Location: Burnet County
- Length: 4.368 mi (7.030 km)
- Existed: 1955–present

Ranch to Market Road 2342 (RM 2342) is located in Burnet County.

RM 2342 begins at an intersection with RM 1431 just east of Kingsland near where the Colorado and Llano Rivers meet. The highway travels in a northeastern direction and passes by a golf course before turning in a more northern direction near Boil Spring. RM 2342 continues to run in a generally northern direction before ending at an intersection with Park Road 4 just west of Longhorn Cavern State Park.

RM 2342 was designated on August 24, 1955, along the current route.

== FM 2343 ==
Farm to Market Road 2343
- Location: Sabine County
- Length: 6.344 mi (10.210 km)
- Existed: August 24, 1955–present

Farm to Market Road 2343 (FM 2343) is located in Sabine County, mainly within the Sabine National Forest. It runs from SH 87 in the community of Yellowpine to FM 201. The roadway continues past this intersection as Scrappin Valley Drive.

FM 2343 was designated on August 24, 1955, from SH 87 at Yellowpine southwest 2.8 miles (4.5 km) to a road intersection. On September 28, 1995, by district request, the road was extended southwest to what was then Forest Highway 87.

== FM 2344 ==
Farm to Market Road 2344
- Location: Collingsworth County
- Length: 4.153 mi (6.684 km)
- Existed: 1955–present

== FM 2345 ==
Farm to Market Road 2345
- Location: Wichita County
- Length: 7.057 mi (11.357 km)
- Existed: October 31, 1957–present

=== FM 2345 (1955) ===
Farm to Market Road 2345
- Location: Bowie County
- Existed: August 24, 1955–October 25, 1955

The original FM 2345 was designated on August 24, 1955, from SH 8 4.0 mi north of Corley east and south 8.9 miles (14.3 km) to US 67. This was cancelled on October 25, 1955, in exchange for extending FM 2149 to that point on US 67.

== FM 2346 ==
Farm to Market Road 2346
- Location: Madison County
- Length: 6.529 mi (10.507 km)
- Existed: August 24, 1955–present

== FM 2347 ==
Farm to Market Road 2347
- Location: Brazos County
- Length: 2.87 mi (4.62 km)
- Existed: January 31, 1967–present

Farm to Market Road 2347 (FM 2347), known as George Bush Drive (formerly Jersey Street), is in Brazos County, running from Easterwood Airport northeastward to Bus. SH 6 in College Station. This route runs along the southern border of the Texas A&M University main campus and is the location for the George Bush Presidential Library.

FM 2347 begins at the Easterwood Airport on the campus of Texas A&M University in College Station, Brazos County, heading east on two-lane undivided George Bush Drive West. The road curves northeast and intersects FM 2818, at which point it becomes a four-lane divided highway. The highway heads through areas of fields and trees, passing to the southeast of the George Bush Presidential Library. FM 2347 continues through more of the campus, running to the southeast of the university's sports fields. After passing near Olsen Field, the road crosses a Union Pacific railroad line and crosses FM 2154. The highway becomes George Bush Drive and runs between Texas A&M University to the northwest and residential neighborhoods to the southeast. FM 2347 passes southeast of the University Golf Course and comes to its terminus at Bus. SH 6.

The current FM 2347 was designated onto its current alignment on January 31, 1967. This was the former SH 307. The route was redesignated Urban Road 2347 (UR 2347) on June 27, 1995. The designation reverted to FM 2347 with the elimination of the Urban Road system on November 15, 2018.

Junction list

The entire route is in College Station, Brazos County.

mi	km	Destinations	Notes
0.0	0.0	Easterwood Airport	
0.3	0.48	FM 2818 (Harvey Mitchell Parkway)	
1.5	2.4	FM 2154 (Wellborn Road) – Northgate	
2.9	4.7	Bus. SH 6 (Texas Avenue)	
1.000 mi = 1.609 km; 1.000 km = 0.621 mi

=== FM 2347 (1955) ===
Farm to Market Road 2347
- Location: Milam County
- Existed: August 24, 1955–August 16, 1966

A previous route numbered FM 2347 was designated on August 24, 1955, from US 190 (now FM 485) at Maysfield north 3.5 miles (5.6 km) to a road intersection. On September 27, 1960, the road was extended northeast 3.0 miles (4.8 km) to a county road near Jones Prairie and extended again on October 20, 1961, to FM 2027 at Cross Roads. FM 2347 was cancelled on August 16, 1966, and became a portion of FM 979.

== FM 2348 ==
Farm to Market Road 2348
- Location: Titus County
- Length: 8.462 mi (13.618 km)
- Existed: 1955–present

Farm to Market Road 2348 (FM 2348) is located in Titus County.

FM 2348 begins at an intersection with SH 11 southwest of the Welsh Reservoir. The highway travels in a generally northwestern direction before turning in a more northern direction near FM 4000. FM 2348 runs just east of Mount Pleasant and intersects SH 49 before ending at an intersection with US 67 / FM 1001.

FM 2348 was designated on August 24, 1955, running from SH 49 southward to a road intersection at a distance of 4.1 miles (6.6 km). The highway was extended 5.8 miles (9.3 km) southward to SH 11 on October 31, 1957. FM 2348 was extended 3.16 miles (5.09 km) northward to US 67 on September 27, 2001.

Junction list

The entire route is in Titus County.

Location	mi	km	Destinations	Notes
	0.0	0.0	SH 11 – Pittsburg, Daingerfield	
	7.5	12.1	FM 4000 – Mount Pleasant	
	8.5	13.7	SH 49 – Mount Pleasant, Daingerfield	
	11.6	18.7	US 67 / FM 1001 north – Mount Pleasant, Omaha	
1.000 mi = 1.609 km; 1.000 km = 0.621 mi

== FM 2349 ==
Farm to Market Road 2349
- Location: Sherman and Hansford counties
- Length: 15.975 mi (25.709 km)
- Existed: October 31, 1957–present

=== FM 2349 (1955) ===
Farm to Market Road 2349
- Location: Gillespie County
- Existed: August 24, 1955–January 19, 1956

The original FM 2349 was designated on August 24, 1955 from US 290 near Fredericksburg southeast 5 miles to Cain City. FM 2349 was cancelled on January 19, 1956 by request of county officials.

== FM 2350 ==
Farm to Market Road 2350
- Location: Borden County
- Length: 7.546 mi (12.144 km)
- Existed: May 2, 1962–present

=== FM 2350 (1955) ===
Farm to Market Road 2350
- Location: Jack County
- Existed: August 24, 1955–October 3, 1961

A previous route numbered FM 2350 was designated on August 24, 1955, from US 281 in Perrin, west and north 5.8 miles (9.3 km) to a road intersection. On November 24, 1959, the road was extended east 4.6 miles (7.4 km) toward Gibtown. FM 2350 was cancelled on October 3, 1961, and became a portion of FM 2210.

== FM 2351 ==
Farm to Market Road 2351
- Location: Harris and Galveston counties
- Length: 5.882 mi (9.466 km)
- Existed: January 24, 1959–present

Farm to Market Road 2351 (FM 2351) is located in Harris and Galveston counties in the southeastern Greater Houston area.

FM 2351 begins at the Brazoria–Galveston county line in Friendswood; the road continues into Brazoria County through Pearland as Brazoria County Road 129. The highway travels through Friendswood as Edgewood Avenue and intersects FM 518 near the center of town. FM 2351 crosses Clear Creek and crosses into Harris County before entering Houston at an intersection with Beamer Road. In Houston, the highway travels along Clear Lake City Boulevard and intersects I-45 before ending at an intersection with SH 3.

The current FM 2351 was designated on January 24, 1959, running from FM 518 at Friendswood southwestward to the Brazoria County line at a distance of 1.7 miles (2.7 km). The highway was extended 1.5 miles (2.4 km) northeast of FM 518 to a point 0.5 miles (0.80 km) north of Clear Creek on May 6, 1964. FM 2351 was extended 3.0 miles (4.8 km) northeastward to SH 3 on June 1, 1965. An extension to SH 146 at Shoreacres was proposed on December 21, 1987, but was never built. The route was redesignated Urban Road 2351 (UR 2351) on June 27, 1995. The designation reverted to FM 2351 with the elimination of the Urban Road system on November 15, 2018.

Junction list

County	Location	mi	km	Destinations	Notes
Galveston	Friendswood	0.0	0.0	Brazoria County Road 129	Western terminus; continuation into Brazoria County
Galveston	Friendswood	1.6	2.6	FM 518 (Friendswood Drive) – Pearland, League City	
Harris	Houston	4.9	7.9	I-45 (Gulf Freeway) – Houston, Galveston	I-45 exit 23
Harris	Houston	5.9	9.5	SH 3 (Galveston Road) – Ellington Airport	Eastern terminus
1.000 mi = 1.609 km; 1.000 km = 0.621 mi

=== FM 2351 (1955) ===
Farm to Market Road 2351
- Location: Kimble County
- Existed: August 24, 1955–December 13, 1956

The first route numbered FM 2351 was designated on August 24, 1955, running from FM 385 (now RM 385) eastward to the Mason county line at a distance of 6.6 miles (10.6 km). The highway was redesignated as Ranch to Market Road 2351 (RM 2351) at the same time FM 385 became an RM (by September 19, 1956). The highway was cancelled and combined with RM 1871 on December 13, 1956.

=== FM 2351 (1957) ===
Farm to Market Road 2351
- Location: Deaf Smith County
- Existed: October 31, 1957–November 26, 1958

The second route numbered FM 2351 was designated on October 31, 1957, running from SH 51 (now US 385) north of Hereford eastward at a distance of 5.0 miles (8.0 km). The highway was cancelled and combined with FM 1062 on November 26, 1958.

== FM 2352 ==
Farm to Market Road 2352
- Location: Lamar County
- Length: 7.797 mi (12.548 km)
- Existed: 1955–present

== FM 2353 ==
Farm to Market Road 2353
- Location: Palo Pinto County
- Length: 5.893 mi (9.484 km)
- Existed: November 21, 1956–present

Farm to Market Road 2353 (FM 2353) is located in Palo Pinto County.

FM 2353 begins at an intersection with SH 16 near the Possum Kingdom Lake dam. The highway starts out running in a western direction then turns in a slight northwest direction near the Brazos River Authority's lake office. FM 2353 travels through more scenic areas near the eastern shore of Possum Kingdom Lake, intersecting Park Road 36 about a mile south of the Possum Kingdom Airport. North of Park Road 36, the highway's route becomes less rural as it runs in close proximity to the eastern shore of the lake and runs in a slight northeast direction. FM 2353 continues to run in a northeast direction through more suburban areas of Possum Kingdom, ending at an intersection with SH 16 near Tranquility Cove.

The current FM 2353 was designated on November 21, 1956, running from SH 254 (now SH 16) southwestward along the eastern shore of Possum Kingdom Lake to Park Road 36 at a distance of 4.0 miles (6.4 km). The highway was extended 2.4 miles (3.9 km) south of Park Road 36 to SH 16 on May 6, 1964.

=== FM 2353 (1955) ===
Farm to Market Road 2353
- Location: Liberty County
- Existed: August 24, 1955–September 20, 1956

A previous route numbered FM 2353 was designated on August 24, 1955, beginning at SH 146 near Moss Hill, then running westward at a distance of 2.2 miles (3.5 km). The highway was cancelled and removed from the state highway system on September 20, 1956.

== FM 2354 ==
Farm to Market Road 2354
- Location: Chambers County
- Length: 11.306 mi (18.195 km)
- Existed: August 24, 1955–present

Farm to Market Road 2354 is located in Chambers County. It runs from FM 565 west and south to FM 1405.

FM 2354 was designated on August 24, 1955 from FM 565 to a point 8 miles south. On August 27, 1962 the road was extended west 4.3 miles to FM 1405 (this extension was in exchange for cancelling an extension of FM 562 and all of FM 2795).

== RM 2355 ==
Ranch to Market Road 2355
- Location: Ward County
- Length: 21.484 mi (34.575 km)
- Existed: May 2, 1962–present

=== FM 2355 ===
Farm to Market Road 2355
- Location: Swisher and Hale counties
- Existed: September 21, 1955–October 10, 1961

== FM 2356 ==
Farm to Market Road 2356
- Location: Throckmorton County
- Length: 5.116 mi (8.233 km)
- Existed: September 20, 1961–present

=== FM 2356 (1955) ===
Farm to Market Road 2356
- Location: Deaf Smith County
- Existed: September 21, 1955–October 6, 1960

A previous route numbered FM 2356 was designated on September 21, 1955, from FM 1058, 6 miles (9.7 km) west of Hereford, north 7.0 miles (11.3 km) to a county road. FM 2356 was cancelled on October 6, 1960, and transferred to FM 1057.

== FM 2357 ==
Farm to Market Road 2357
- Location: Hartley County
- Length: 10.986 mi (17.680 km)
- Existed: 1955–present

== FM 2358 ==
Farm to Market Road 2358
- Location: Hunt County
- Length: 1.191 mi (1.917 km)
- Existed: January 31, 1969–present

=== FM 2358 (1955) ===
Farm to Market Road 2358
- Location: Cameron County
- Existed: September 21, 1955–November 10, 1967

== FM 2359 ==
Farm to Market Road 2359
- Location: Duval County
- Length: 7.514 mi (12.093 km)
- Existed: 1955–present

== FM 2360 ==
Farm to Market Road 2360
- Location: Starr County
- Length: 8.998 mi (14.481 km)
- Existed: 1955–present

== FM 2361 ==
Farm to Market Road 2361
- Location: Hall County
- Length: 7.09 mi (11.41 km)
- Existed: 1955–present

== FM 2362 ==
Farm to Market Road 2362
- Location: Donley County
- Length: 12.104 mi (19.479 km)
- Existed: 1955–present

== FM 2363 ==
Farm to Market Road 2363
- Location: Hardeman County
- Length: 4.957 mi (7.978 km)
- Existed: 1955–present

== FM 2364 ==
Farm to Market Road 2364
- Location: Hardeman County
- Length: 3.098 mi (4.986 km)
- Existed: 1955–present

== FM 2365 ==
Farm to Market Road 2365
- Location: Knox County
- Length: 6.394 mi (10.290 km)
- Existed: 1955–present

== FM 2366 ==
Farm to Market Road 2366
- Location: Maverick County
- Length: 7.654 mi (12.318 km)
- Existed: 1955–2006

Farm to Market Road 2366 (FM 2366) was located in Maverick County.

FM 2366 was designated on September 21, 1955, from FM 1021 southeast of Eagle Pass south and east to FM 1021 1.0 mile (1.6 km) north of El Indio. FM 2366 was cancelled on December 14, 2006, and the road was sold to Cinco 1994 Family Limited Partnership, who owns the land adjacent to FM 2366.

== FM 2367 ==
Farm to Market Road 2367
- Location: Dimmit County
- Length: 1.985 mi (3.195 km)
- Existed: 1955–present

Farm to Market Road 2367 (FM 2367) is located in Dimmit County. From an intersection with FM 186 west of Carrizo Springs, it runs northwest and then southwest for approximately 2 miles (3.2 km) before state maintenance ends.

FM 2367 was designated on September 21, 1955, along the current route.

== FM 2368 ==
Farm to Market Road 2368
- Location: Dimmit County
- Length: 1.559 mi (2.509 km)
- Existed: 1955–present

== FM 2369 ==
Farm to Market Road 2369
- Location: Uvalde County
- Length: 10.886 mi (17.519 km)
- Existed: 1955–present

Farm to Market Road 2369 (FM 2369) is located in Uvalde County.

FM 2369 begins at an intersection with US 90 west of Uvalde. The highway travels in a northwestern direction and turns east at a county road. FM 2369 intersects FM 1403 and enters Uvalde near an intersection with FM 1435. The highway travels through the northern part of the town along Front Street and crosses under US 83 before leaving the town near Camp Street. After leaving Uvalde, FM 2369 travels in a northeastern direction and intersects FM 1023 and FM 3447 before ending at US 90 northeast of Uvalde.

FM 2369 was designated on September 21, 1955, traveling from US 90 west of Uvalde northward and eastward to US 83 at a distance of 7.0 miles (11.3 km). The highway was extended 4.5 miles (7.2 km) to US 90 northeast of Uvalde on January 22, 1958, and a spur route traveling along Getty Street in Uvalde was created. This extension was formerly proposed as FM 1906. The spur route was cancelled and redesignated as Spur 144 on July 14, 1961.

Junction list

The entire route is in Uvalde County.

Location	mi	km	Destinations	Notes
	0.0	0.0	US 90	
	4.1	6.6	FM 1403 north	
Uvalde	6.2	10.0	FM 1435 south (N. Front Street)	
Uvalde	6.5	10.5	Spur 144 south (N. Getty Street)	
Uvalde	6.7	10.8	US 83 (N. Milam Street)	Interchange
	7.5	12.1	FM 1023 south	
	8.6	13.8	FM 3447 south	
	10.9	17.5	US 90	
1.000 mi = 1.609 km; 1.000 km = 0.621 mi

== FM 2370 ==
Farm to Market Road 2370
- Location: Dawson County
- Length: 5.035 mi (8.103 km)
- Existed: 1955–present

== FM 2371 ==
Farm to Market Road 2371
- Location: Andrews County
- Length: 11.188 mi (18.005 km)
- Existed: 1955–present

== FM 2372 ==
Farm to Market Road 2372
- Location: Palo Pinto County
- Length: 4.216 mi (6.785 km)
- Existed: 1956–present

=== FM 2372 (1955) ===
Farm to Market Road 2372
- Location: Bailey County
- Existed: September 21, 1955–by 1956

A previous route numbered FM 2372 was designated on September 21, 1955, from US 84 northwest of Progress east to FM 299 (now SH 214). This was cancelled by 1956.

== FM 2373 ==
Farm to Market Road 2373
- Location: Carson and Armstrong counties
- Length: 12.827 mi (20.643 km)
- Existed: 1955–present

== FM 2374 ==
Farm to Market Road 2374
- Location: Baylor County
- Length: 2.986 mi (4.806 km)
- Existed: October 31, 1958–present

=== FM 2374 (1955) ===
Farm to Market Road 2374
- Location: Willacy County
- Existed: September 21, 1955–September 12, 1958

A previous route numbered FM 2374 was designated on September 21, 1955, from FM 498, 7.3 miles (11.7 km) east of US 77, south 3.0 miles (4.8 km) to FM 1018. FM 2374 was cancelled on September 12, 1958, and transferred to FM 507.

== RM 2375 ==
Ranch to Market Road 2375
- Location: Gray County
- Length: 6.854 mi (11.030 km)
- Existed: 1955–present

== FM 2376 ==
Farm to Market Road 2376
- Location: Brown County
- Length: 2.248 mi (3.618 km)
- Existed: March 30, 2006–present

Farm to Market Road 2376 (FM 2376) is located in Brown County in Brownwood.

FM 2376 begins at an intersection with FM 45 in southern Brownwood. The highway travels near Gordon Hayward Stadium and travels through rural parts of the city before running through an industrial area north of the FM 3064 intersection. FM 2376 travels through a residential area with state maintenance ending at an intersection with Asbury Street.

The current FM 2376 was designated on October 27, 2005, as FM 823, which also replaced the part of FM 3064 north of the east end of FM 3064. It was determined shortly before March 30, 2006, that FM 823 still existed, so the number was changed to FM 2376 on March 30, 2006.

=== FM 2376 (1955) ===
Farm to Market Road 2376
- Location: Rockwall County
- Existed: September 21, 1955–November 4, 1955

The first route numbered FM 2376 was designated on September 21, 1955, running from FM 548 eastward to the Hunt County line. FM 2376 was cancelled on November 4, 1955, with the mileage being transferred to FM 1143 (now SH 276).

=== FM 2376 (1956) ===
Farm to Market Road 2376
- Location: Tarrant and Parker counties
- Existed: November 21, 1956–December 20, 1984

The second route numbered FM 2376 was designated on November 21, 1956, traveling from US 377 near Wheatland to a county road in Parker County at a distance of 5.3 miles (8.5 km). The highway was extended 2.5 miles (4.0 km) to FM 5 near Aledo on June 1, 1965. FM 2376 was cancelled on December 20, 1984, with the mileage being transferred to FM 1187.

== FM 2377 ==
Farm to Market Road 2377
- Location: Ellis County
- Length: 4.207 mi (6.771 km)
- Existed: 1955–present

Farm to Market Road 2377 (FM 2377) is located in Ellis County.

FM 2377 begins at an intersection with SH 342 in Red Oak. The highway travels in a southern direction along Louise Ritter Drive and turns east near Red Oak High School before running along the northern edge of Pecan Hill. FM 2377 turns southeast at Pratt Road and ends at an intersection with FM 983 near Rockett.

FM 2377 was designated on October 25, 1955, along the current route.

== FM 2378 ==
Farm to Market Road 2378
- Location: Lubbock County
- Length: 18.044 mi (29.039 km)
- Existed: May 6, 1964–present

Farm to Market Road 2378 (FM 2378) is located in Lubbock County.

FM 2378 begins at an intersection with FM 1585 near Wolfforth. The highway travels in a northern direction in close proximity to the Hockley county line for its entire length. FM 2378 has major intersections with SH 114 near Reese Center, FM 2641 northwest of Lubbock and FM 1294 west of Shallowater before ending at an intersection with US 84 southeast of Roundup.

The current FM 2378 was designated on May 6, 1964, running from SH 116 (now SH 114) southward to FM 1585 at a distance of 6.4 miles (10.3 km). The highway was extended 4.7 miles (7.6 km) northward to FM 2641 on May 7, 1970. FM 2378 was extended 7.2 miles (11.6 km) northward to US 84 on September 29, 1977.

Junction list

The entire route is in Lubbock County.

Location	mi	km	Destinations	Notes
	0.0	0.0	FM 1585	
	6.4	10.3	SH 114 – Levelland, Lubbock	
	11.0	17.7	FM 2641	
	13.9	22.4	FM 1294 – Shallowater	
	18.1	29.1	US 84 – Littlefield, Lubbock	
1.000 mi = 1.609 km; 1.000 km = 0.621 mi

=== FM 2378 (1956) ===
Farm to Market Road 2378
- Location: Wise County
- Existed: November 21, 1956–July 26, 1963

FM 2378 was designated on November 21, 1956, running from FM 51 westward to Cottondale at a distance of 4.0 miles (6.4 km). The highway was cancelled on July 26, 1963, with the mileage being transferred to FM 2123.

=== RM 2378 (1955) ===
Ranch to Market Road 2378
- Location: Edwards County
- Existed: October 25, 1955–April 19, 1956

RM 2378 was designated on October 25, 1955, running from SH 41 southward to Hackberry at a distance of 12.0 miles (19.3 km). On February 23, 1956, the highway was extended south 10.0 miles (16.1 km) to Vance. The highway was cancelled on April 19, 1956, with the mileage being transferred to FM 335 (which was later changed to an RM).

== FM 2379 ==
Farm to Market Road 2379
- Location: Wilbarger County
- Length: 4.873 mi (7.842 km)
- Existed: May 20, 1961–present

=== FM 2379 (1956) ===
Farm to Market Road 2379
- Location: Archer County
- Existed: November 21, 1956–February 2, 1959

The first use of the FM 2379 designation was in Archer County, from FM 210, 2.5 miles (4.0 km) west of SH 25, southwest 8.2 miles (13.2 km) to a road intersection. FM 2379 was cancelled on February 2, 1959, and transferred to FM 2178.

=== FM 2379 (1960) ===
Farm to Market Road 2379
- Location: San Augustine County
- Existed: February 5, 1960–May 3, 1961

The next use of the FM 2379 designation was in San Augustine County, from SH 147 near Broaddus, east 8.2 miles (13.2 km) to the then proposed location of FM 705. FM 2379 was cancelled on May 3, 1961, and transferred to FM 83.

== FM 2380 ==
Farm to Market Road 2380
- Location: Archer and Wichita counties
- Length: 2.026 mi (3.261 km)
- Existed: 1956–present

Farm to Market Road 2380 (FM 2380) is located in Archer and Wichita counties entirely in Wichita Falls.

FM 2380 begins at an intersection with SH 79 just south of the Archer–Wichita county line near Lakeside City. The highway travels along Kemp Boulevard near the western shore of Lake Wichita; north of the lake, FM 2380 travels near a subdivision before ending at an intersection with FM 369.

FM 2380 was designated on November 21, 1956, along the current route. The route was redesignated Urban Road 2380 (UR 2380) on June 27, 1995. The designation reverted to FM 2380 with the elimination of the Urban Road system on November 15, 2018.

== RM 2381 ==
Ranch to Market Road 2381
- Location: Potter County
- Length: 6.34 mi (10.20 km)
- Existed: October 31, 1958–present

Ranch to Market Road 2381 (RM 2381) is located in Potter County.

RM 2381 begins at I-40 in Bushland. The highway passes near a few subdivisions before having a more rural route. RM 2381 continues to run through rural areas before ending at an intersection with RM 1061.

RM 2381 was designated on October 31, 1958, along the current route.

=== FM 2381 (1956) ===
Farm to Market Road 2381
- Location: Baylor County
- Existed: November 21, 1956–October 30, 1957

FM 2381 was designated on November 21, 1956, from FM 1919 3.8 miles (6.1 km) north of Seymour northward 4.0 miles (6.4 km). This route was cancelled on October 30, 1957, in exchange for extending FM 2069 eastward from 3 miles (4.8 km) north of US 82 to FM 1789.

== FM 2382 ==
Farm to Market Road 2382
- Location: Montague and Cooke counties
- Length: 9.476 mi (15.250 km)
- Existed: 1956–present

Farm to Market Road 2382 (FM 2382) is located in Montague and Cooke counties.

The southern terminus of FM 2382 is in Montague County, at US 82 in St. Jo. The route travels to the northeast along Evans Street before leaving the city limits. FM 2382 crosses into Cooke County and reaches its northern terminus at FM 373 in Bulcher, approximately 1.5 miles (2.4 km) south of the Red River.

FM 2382 was designated on November 21, 1956, along the current route. The western terminus of FM 373 was at FM 2382 from February 15, 1959, to December 20, 1988, when FM 373 was extended to FM 677.

== FM 2383 ==
Farm to Market Road 2383
- Location: Cooke County
- Length: 5.306 mi (8.539 km)
- Existed: 1956–present

== FM 2384 ==
Farm to Market Road 2384
- Location: Wichita County
- Length: 10.519 mi (16.929 km)
- Existed: 1956–present

== FM 2385 ==
Farm to Market Road 2385
- Location: Carson County
- Length: 14.874 mi (23.937 km)
- Existed: 1956–present

== FM 2386 ==
Farm to Market Road 2386
- Location: Carson County
- Length: 5.822 mi (9.370 km)
- Existed: September 20, 1961–present

=== FM 2386 (1956) ===
Farm to Market Road 2386
- Location: Deaf Smith County
- Existed: November 21, 1956–November 26, 1958

A previous route numbered FM 2386 was designated on November 21, 1956, from SH 51 (now US 385) 2 miles (3.2 km) south of Hereford, south 2.5 miles (4.0 km) to the Castro County line. FM 2386 was cancelled on November 26, 1958, and transferred to FM 1305 (now FM 1055).

== FM 2387 ==
Farm to Market Road 2387
- Location: Hansford County
- Length: 9.593 mi (15.438 km)
- Existed: 1956–present

== FM 2388 ==
Farm to Market Road 2388
- Location: Hemphill County
- Length: 5.448 mi (8.768 km)
- Existed: 1956–present

== RM 2389 ==
Ranch to Market Road 2389
- Location: Mason County
- Length: 4.721 mi (7.598 km)
- Existed: September 27, 1961–present

=== FM 2389 (1956) ===
Farm to Market Road 2389
- Location: Ochiltree County
- Existed: November 21, 1956–February 16, 1960

FM 2389 was designated on November 21, 1956, from SH 70, 21 miles (34 km) south of Perryton, to a point 8.0 miles (12.9 km) east. On October 31, 1957, the road was extended 6.4 miles (10.3 km) east to US 83. A year later the road was extended west 5.0 miles (8.0 km) from SH 70, and another 4.5 miles (7.2 km) on November 24, 1959. FM 2389 was cancelled on February 16, 1960, and transferred to FM 281.

== FM 2390 ==
Farm to Market Road 2390
- Location: San Augustine County
- Length: 5.642 mi (9.080 km)
- Existed: September 30, 1964–present

=== FM 2390 (1956) ===
Farm to Market Road 2390
- Location: Randall County
- Existed: November 21, 1956–November 29, 1957

The first use of the FM 2390 designation was in Randall County, from FM 285, 1.7 miles (2.7 km) east of US 87, north 5.0 miles (8.0 km) to a road intersection. On October 31, 1957, the road was extended north to SH 217, but FM 2390 was cancelled on November 29, 1957, and transferred to FM 1541.

=== FM 2390 (1958) ===
Farm to Market Road 2390
- Location: Cooke County
- Existed: October 31, 1958–May 11, 1964

The next use of the FM 2390 designation was in Cooke County, from FM 372, 3 miles (4.8 km) southeast of Gainesville, southeast 5.5 miles (8.9 km) to a road intersection near Dye. On November 24, 1959, the road was extended southeast 5.2 miles (8.4 km) to a county road. On September 27, 1960, the road was extended east 1.0 mile (1.6 km) to the Grayson County line. FM 2390 was cancelled om May 11, 1964, and transferred to FM 902.

== FM 2391 ==
Farm to Market Road 2391
- Location: Roberts and Gray counties
- Length: 7.782 mi (12.524 km)
- Existed: 1956–present

== FM 2392 ==
Farm to Market Road 2392
- Location: Castro County
- Length: 5.948 mi (9.572 km)
- Existed: 1956–present

== FM 2393 ==
Farm to Market Road 2393
- Location: Clay County
- Length: 22.473 mi (36.167 km)
- Existed: 1957–present

Farm to Market Road 2393 (FM 2393) is located in western Clay County.

FM 2393 is a two-lane road for its entire length. The route begins to the north of Lake Arrowhead and Lake Arrowhead State Park at an intersection with FM 1954. Traveling to the east, it meets FM 1954 for the second time, as that route forms a loop to the park. Past this intersection, FM 2393 turns more to the north. It crosses US 82/US 287 in Jolly followed by SH 79 in Dean. The route then travels in a northwesterly direction before terminating at FM 171 in the unincorporated community of Thornberry.

The current route was designated on October 31, 1957, connecting Dean to Jolly. The northern extension from Dean to Thornberry was designated on June 21, 1967, replacing FM 2715. The southern section from Jolly to FM 1954 was added to the state highway system on November 3, 1971.

Junction list

The entire route is in Clay County.

Location	mi	km	Destinations	Notes
	0.0	0.0	FM 1954 – Holliday	Southern terminus
	1.4	2.3	FM 1954 (Nitana Lane) – Lake Arrowhead State Park	
Jolly	8.0	12.9	Loop 47	
Jolly	8.1	13.0	US 82 / US 287 – Wichita Falls, Henrietta	
Jolly	11.6	18.7	FM 3393 (Tammen Road)	
Dean	13.8	22.2	SH 79 – Wichita Falls, Petrolia	
	20.2	32.5	FM 1740	
Thornberry	22.5	36.2	FM 171	Northern terminus
1.000 mi = 1.609 km; 1.000 km = 0.621 mi

=== FM 2393 (1956) ===
Farm to Market Road 2393
- Location: Dawson County
- Existed: November 21, 1956–February 1957

FM 2393 was originally designated on November 21, 1956, from FM 178 in Midway eastward 3.0 miles (4.8 km) to a road intersection. This was cancelled 90 days later.

== FM 2394 ==
Farm to Market Road 2394
- Location: Anderson County
- Length: 1.748 mi (2.813 km)
- Existed: June 2, 1967–present

=== FM 2394 (1956) ===
Farm to Market Road 2394
- Location: Hale County
- Existed: November 26, 1956–November 21, 1957

The first use of the FM 2394 designation was in Hale County, from FM 788 east of Finney north 4.0 miles (6.4 km) to the Swisher County line. FM 2394 was cancelled on November 21, 1957, and transferred to FM 1612.

=== FM 2394 (1958) ===
Farm to Market Road 2394
- Location: Potter and Randall counties
- Existed: October 31, 1958–May 12, 1966

The next use of the FM 2394 designation was in Potter and Randall counties, from FM 1151, 4.5 miles (7.2 km) west of the Armstrong County line, north 5.5 miles (8.9 km) to the Potter County line. On September 20, 1961, the road was extended southeast 5.0 miles (8.0 km) from FM 1151. On June 1, 1965, the road was extended north 0.7 miles (1.1 km) to I-40. FM 2394 was cancelled on May 12, 1966, and became a portion of FM 1258.

== FM 2395 ==
Farm to Market Road 2395
- Location: Baylor County
- Length: 6.413 mi (10.321 km)
- Existed: January 31, 1961–present

=== FM 2395 (1956) ===
Farm to Market Road 2395
- Location: Hockley County
- Existed: November 21, 1956–January 13, 1960

A previous route numbered FM 2395 was designated on November 21, 1956, from FM 597 at Anton, south and west 14.2 miles (22.9 km) to Hodge School. On November 26, 1958, a 4.8-mile (7.7 km) section from 9.3 miles (15.0 km) south of FM 597 westward was transferred to FM 1294. The remainder of FM 2395 was cancelled on January 13, 1960, and transferred to FM 168.

== FM 2396 ==
Farm to Market Road 2396
- Location: Parmer County
- Length: 6.783 mi (10.916 km)
- Existed: 1956–present

== FM 2397 ==
Farm to Market Road 2397
- Location: Parmer and Castro counties
- Length: 27.105 mi (43.621 km)
- Existed: November 21, 1956–present

Farm to Market Road 2397 (FM 2397) is located in Parmer and Castro counties. It runs from SH 214 south of Friona to CR 608 with a spur connection to Friona. There is a brief concurrency with FM 1057.

FM 2397 was designated on November 21, 1956, from FM 299 (now SH 214) near Friona east, south and east 7.6 miles (12.2 km) to a road intersection (now FM 1172). On September 27, 1960, the road was extended east 4.7 miles (7.6 km) to the Castro County line. On November 26, 1969, the road was extended 14.7 miles (23.7 km) to a road intersection (now CR 608), creating a concurrency with FM 1057 as well as replacing a portion of it. On January 30, 1976, the road was extended west 0.5 miles (0.80 km) to new SH 214 and a 0.6 miles (0.97 km) spur connection to Spur 270 (now Bus. SH 214) in Friona along old SH 214 was added.

== RM 2398 ==
Ranch to Market Road 2398
- Location: Crockett County
- Length: 15.032 mi (24.192 km)
- Existed: June 12, 1968–present

Ranch to Market Road 2398 (RM 2398) is located in Crockett County.

RM 2398 begins at I-10 exit 350 and runs in a generally east-southeast direction before ending at I-10 exit 363 near Ozona.

RM 2398 was designated on June 12, 1968, along its current route. The highway generally follows the former route of US 290.

Junction list

The entire route is in Crockett County.

Location	mi	km	Destinations	Notes
	0.0	0.0	I-10	I-10 exit 350
	12.1	19.5	RM 2083 south to I-10	
	14.8	23.8	Loop 466 east – Ozona	
	15.0	24.1	I-10 – Fort Stockton	I-10 exit 363
1.000 mi = 1.609 km; 1.000 km = 0.621 mi

=== FM 2398 (1956) ===
Farm to Market Road 2398
- Location: Swisher and Armstrong counties
- Existed: November 21, 1956–June 2, 1967

FM 2398 was designated on November 21, 1956, running from FM 146 northward to the Armstrong County line at a distance of 7.1 miles (11.4 km). The highway was extended 1.0 mile (1.6 km) northward to FM 285 on October 31, 1957. The highway was cancelled and combined with FM 2301 on June 2, 1967.

== FM 2399 ==
Farm to Market Road 2399
- Location: Galveston County
- Length: 3.8 mi (6.1 km)
- Existed: November 19, 1970–present

Farm to Market Road 2399 (FM 2399) is located in Galveston County.

FM 2399 begins at an intersection with SH 6 in Hitchcock, traveling in a northern direction along Delany Road. The highway enters Texas City at a junction with I-45, with Delany Road becoming Century Boulevard. FM 2399 travels through a rural/undeveloped area of the city before ending at a junction with FM 1764.

The current FM 2399 was designated on November 19, 1970, running from FM 1764 in Texas City southward to SH 6 in Hitchcock. The route was redesignated Urban Road 2399 (UR 2399) on June 27, 1995. The designation reverted to FM 2399 with the elimination of the Urban Road system on November 15, 2018.

Junction list

The entire route is in Galveston County.

Location	mi	km	Destinations	Notes
Hitchcock	0.0	0.0	SH 6	
Hitchcock–Texas City line	2.6– 3.0	4.2– 4.8	I-45 (Gulf Freeway) / Monticello Road	I-45 exit 13
Texas City	3.8	6.1	FM 1764 (Emmett F. Lowry Expressway)	Interchange
1.000 mi = 1.609 km; 1.000 km = 0.621 mi

=== FM 2399 (1956) ===
Farm to Market Road 2399
- Location: Ector County
- Existed: November 21, 1956–June 4, 1970

A previous route numbered FM 2399 was designated on November 21, 1956, running from FM 1357 (now Loop 338) at Country Club Estates westward 2.1 miles (3.4 km) to the intersection of 42nd Street and Grandview Avenue near Odessa. On March 29, 1962, a section from 42nd Street and Grandview Avenue east 0.219 miles (0.352 km) was returned to the city of Odessa. On May 24, 1963, a second section from the western terminus east 0.25 miles (0.40 km) was also turned over to the city. The remainder of FM 2399 was cancelled on June 4, 1970, and redesignated as Spur 492 (now SH 191).
