= Farm to Market Road 171 =

Highway in Texas, United States

Farm to Market Road 171

Route information
- Maintained by TxDOT
- Length: 37.212 mi (Note: The certified length given is shorter than the actual mileage, as the TxDOT description of FM 171 considers it to be discontinuous at SH 240 and SH 79.) (59.887 km)
- Existed: 1945–present

Major junctions
- West end: Bus. US 287 in Wichita Falls
- SH 240 in Wichita Falls; SH 79 in Byers
- East end: FM 2332

Location
- Country: United States
- State: Texas
- Counties: Wichita, Clay

Highway system
- Highways in Texas; Interstate; US; State; Former; Toll; Loops; Spurs; FM/RM; Park; Rec
← FM 170	→ FM 172

Farm to Market Road 171 (FM 171) is a farm to market road in Wichita and Clay counties, Texas.

== Route description ==
FM 171 begins in Wichita Falls at an intersection with Bus. US 287 north of the Wichita River. The route travels east on Lincoln Street to SH 240. These two routes are concurrent northbound along King Boulevard before FM 171 turns back to the northeast along Jefferson Street. In the outskirts of Wichita Falls, FM 171 intersects FM 1740 and then FM 890, which provides access to Sheppard AFB. From here, the roadway is known as the Upper Charlie Road (as opposed to FM 1740, referred to as Lower Charlie Road or simply Charlie Road). The route crosses the Wichita–Clay county line and meanders through the farming areas of Clay County. It intersects FM 1177 and then FM 2393 near Thornberry. The highway turns to the east, crossing FM 810 south of the community of Charlie. FM 171 then enters Byers, where it has a brief concurrency with SH 79 through downtown, before it resumes its journey eastward. The roadway then turns southward, roughly paralleling the Red River and the Oklahoma state line, before FM 171 reaches its eastern terminus at FM 2332.

FM 171's roadway is generally two-lane and shoulderless, except for the section in the Wichita Falls metropolitan area (from its western terminus to its junction with FM 890) and during its concurrency with SH 79 in Byers.

== History ==
FM 171 was first commissioned in Clay County on June 11, 1945. Its original designation was from Byers across SH 148 south of Charlie to Wichita Falls. (SH 148 north of Petrolia would become FM 810 in 1948.)The designation was extended eastward to 2.0 miles (3.2 km) east of Byers on October 31, 1957. On November 7, 1958, US 287 was rerouted in downtown Wichita Falls, and the FM 171 designation was extended along Lincoln Street to its current western terminus. The eastern terminus was extended to the south, first 2.5 miles (4.0 km) to a county road on May 2, 1962, and then 4.6 miles (7.4 km) to its current location at FM 2332 on June 1, 1965.

On June 27, 1995, the section from the eastern terminus at US 287 Bus. to the intersection with FM 890 was transferred to Urban Road 171 (UR 171). The designation of the section reverted to FM 171 with the elimination of the Urban Road system on November 15, 2018.

== Major intersections ==
County	Location	mi	km	Destinations	Notes
Wichita	Wichita Falls	0.0	0.0	Bus. US 287 (Scott St.)	Western terminus
Wichita	Wichita Falls	0.3	0.48	SH 240 east (King Blvd.)	West end of SH 240 concurrency
Wichita	Wichita Falls	0.5	0.80	SH 240 west (King Blvd.)	East end of SH 240 concurrency
Wichita		1.9	3.1	FM 1740	
Wichita		2.9	4.7	FM 890 (E. McKinley St.)	
Clay		11.9	19.2	FM 1177 – Cashion	
Clay		12.9	20.8	FM 2393 – Dean, Jolly	
Clay		19.1	30.7	FM 810 – Petrolia, Charlie	
Clay	Byers	27.3	43.9	SH 79 north (Main St.) – Waurika, Oklahoma	West end of SH 79 concurrency
Clay	Byers	27.5	44.3	SH 79 south (Main St.) – Petrolia	East end of SH 79 concurrency
Clay		37.6	60.5	FM 2332 – Stanfield	Eastern terminus
1.000 mi = 1.609 km; 1.000 km = 0.621 mi: Concurrency terminus
