= Charlie, Texas =

- Unincorporated community
- Location within Texas Location within the United States
- Coordinates: 34°5′46″N 98°18′56″W
- Country: United States
- State: Texas
- County: Clay
- Elevation: 945 ft (288 m)

Population (2000)
  - Total: 65
- Time zone: Central (CST)
- ZIP: 76305
- Area code: 940
- GNIS feature ID: 1379535

Charlie is an unincorporated community in northern Clay County, Texas, United States. According to the Handbook of Texas, the community had a population of 65 in 2000. It is located within the Wichita Falls metropolitan area.

== History ==
In 1878, the name Big Wichita Valley was given to the community when Henry T. Dunn constructed a store situated south of the Red River. Charlie Taylor bought the store from Dunn later, and the location became known as Charlie almost instantly. The store served as a well-liked commercial hub for county ranchers, farmers, and some Indians from the neighboring Indian Territory (later Oklahoma) for many years. A post office was established in the village in 1882. Charlie had more than 200 residents by the middle of the 1920s. However, the community's population fell after World War II and the Great Depression. After 1930, the Charlie post office closed. A population estimate of 65 people lived in the town in 2000, based on data from the early 1970s. The population went up to 90 in 2010.

On April 30, 2019, an EF1 tornado struck the town of Dean going north toward Charlie. Trees, two outbuildings, and a house were damaged. A mobile home was also unroofed. A year later, on May 22, 2020, another tornado hit. Multiple storm chasers observed this tornado. Utility poles were damaged on FM 1740.

== Geography ==
Charlie is located at the intersection of Farm to Market Roads 810 and 171, 21 mi (34 km) northwest of Henrietta, 9 mi (14 km) northwest of Petrolia, and 18 mi (29 km) northeast of Wichita Falls in northwestern Clay County.

=== Climate ===
The climate in this area is characterized by hot, humid summers and generally mild to cool winters. According to the Köppen Climate Classification system, Charlie has a humid subtropical climate, abbreviated "Cfa" on climate maps.

== Education ==
Charlie is served by the Petrolia Independent School District.

== Notable person ==
- Skipper Voss, professional bullfighter.
