= Lakeside City, Texas =

- Town
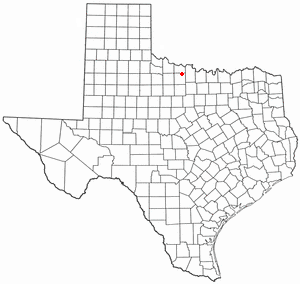
- Location of Lakeside City, Texas

- Coordinates: 33°49′42″N 98°32′29″W
- Country: United States
- State: Texas
- County: Archer

Area
  - Total: 0.63 sq mi (1.64 km^{2})
  - Land: 0.63 sq mi (1.64 km^{2})
  - Water: 0 sq mi (0.00 km^{2})
- Elevation: 978 ft (298 m)

Population (2020)
  - Total: 1,082
  - Density: 1,710/sq mi (660/km^{2})
- Time zone: UTC-6 (Central (CST))
  - Summer (DST): UTC-5 (CDT)
- Zip Code: 76308
- FIPS code: 48-40756
- GNIS feature ID: 2412868
- Website: www.lakesidecitytx.org

Lakeside City is a town in Archer County, Texas, United States. It is part of the Wichita Falls, Texas Metropolitan Statistical Area. The population was 1,082 at the 2020 census.

== Geography ==
Lakeside City is located in northeastern Archer County along the south shore of Lake Wichita. The Archer County/Wichita County border runs through Lake Wichita, with the city of Wichita Falls on the north side of the border. Downtown Wichita Falls is 8 miles (13 km) to the northeast. Texas State Highway 79 touches the southeastern border of the town, leading northeast to Wichita Falls and southwest 17 miles (27 km) to Archer City, the county seat.

According to the United States Census Bureau, the town has a total area of 0.62 square miles (1.6 km^{2}), all land.

== Demographics ==
Historical population
Census	Pop.	Note	%±
1970	187		—
1980	515		175.4%
1990	865		68.0%
2000	984		13.8%
2010	997		1.3%
2020	1,082		8.5%
U.S. Decennial Census

=== 2020 census ===
Lakeside City racial composition (NH = Non-Hispanic) (Note: Note: the US Census treats Hispanic/Latino as an ethnic category. This table excludes Latinos from the racial categories and assigns them to a separate category. Hispanics/Latinos can be of any race.)
Race	Number	Percentage
White (NH)	960	88.72%
Black or African American (NH)	5	0.46%
Native American or Alaska Native (NH)	6	0.55%
Asian (NH)	1	0.09%
Some Other Race (NH)	1	0.09%
Mixed/Multi-Racial (NH)	35	3.23%
Hispanic or Latino	74	6.84%
Total	1,082	

As of the 2020 United States census, there were 1,082 people, 384 households, and 289 families residing in the town.

=== 2008 ===
As of the census of 2008, there were 1,048 people, 353 households, and 301 families residing in the town. The population density was 1,572.7 inhabitants per square mile (607.2/km^{2}). There were 366 housing units at an average density of 585.0 units per square mile (225.9 units/km^{2}). The racial makeup of the town was 97.2% White, 0.30% African American, 0.30% Native American, 0.10% Asian, 0.41% from other races, and 0.61% from two or more races. Hispanic or Latino of any race were 1.63% of the population.

There were 353 households, out of which 36.8% had children under the age of 18 living with them, 75.6% were married couples living together, 7.1% had a female householder with no husband present, and 14.7% were non-families. 10.5% of all households were made up of individuals, and 4.8% had someone living alone who was 65 years of age or older. The average household size was 2.79 and the average family size was 3.02.

In the town, the population was spread out, with 26.1% under the age of 18, 6.4% from 18 to 24, 24.6% from 25 to 44, 30.5% from 45 to 64, and 12.4% who were 65 years of age or older. The median age was 41 years. For every 100 females, there were 100.8 males. For every 100 females age 18 and over, there were 97.6 males.

The 2007 census median income for a household in the town was $67,162, and the 2000 census says the median income for a family was $61,875. Males had a median income of $36,422 versus $31,146 for females. The 2007 per capita income for the town was $28,561. About 1.3% of families and 2.0% of the population were below the poverty line, including 1.7% of those under age 18 and 1.7% of those age 65 or over.

== Education ==
Lakeside City is served by the Holliday Independent School District.

== Cost of living ==
Compared to the rest of the country, Lakeside City's cost of living is 11.60% lower than the U.S. average.
