= Elbert, Texas =

- CDP
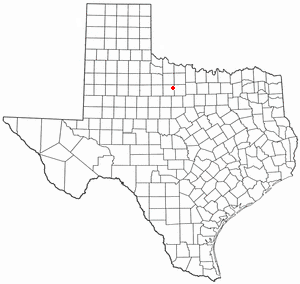
- Location of Elbert, Texas

- Coordinates: 33°16′30″N 98°59′50″W
- Country: United States
- State: Texas
- County: Throckmorton

Area
  - Total: 6.0 sq mi (15.5 km^{2})
  - Land: 6.0 sq mi (15.5 km^{2})
  - Water: 0 sq mi (0.0 km^{2})
- Elevation: 1,171 ft (357 m)

Population (2020)
  - Total: 29
  - Density: 4.8/sq mi (1.9/km^{2})
- Time zone: UTC-6 (Central (CST))
  - Summer (DST): UTC-5 (CDT)
- Zip Code: 76372
- FIPS code: 48-22840
- GNIS feature ID: 2408066

Elbert is a census-designated place (CDP) in Throckmorton County, Texas, United States. On State Highway 79 and Farm Road 1711 in eastern Throckmorton County, Elbert was established in the late 19th century as a ranching supply community to meet the needs of ranchers based to the north along the Brazos River. By 1904, Elbert had a post office, and by 1915, it had 30 residents and a gin operated by W. F. Parsley. From 1940 until 1990, Elbert reported a population of 150. Without a railroad, the town never experienced significant growth. In 2000, the population was 56, and in the 2020 census the population was 29.

== Geography ==
According to the United States Census Bureau in 2000, the CDP has a total area of 11.7 square miles (30.4 km^{2}), all land. Prior to the 2010 census, the CDP lost area, reducing it to a total area of 6.0 square miles (16 km^{2}), all land.

== Demographics ==
Historical population
Census	Pop.	Note	%±
2000	56		—
2010	30		−46.4%
2020	29		−3.3%
U.S. Decennial Census; 1850–1900 1910; 1920 1930 1940; 1950 1960 1970; 1980 1990 2000; 2010

Elbert first appeared as a census designated place in the 2000 U.S. census.

=== 2020 census ===
Elbert CDP, Texas – Racial and ethnic composition Note: the US Census treats Hispanic/Latino as an ethnic category. This table excludes Latinos from the racial categories and assigns them to a separate category. Hispanics/Latinos may be of any race.
Race / Ethnicity (NH = Non-Hispanic)	Pop 2000	Pop 2010	Pop 2020	% 2000	% 2010	% 2020
White alone (NH)	52	29	24	92.86%	96.67%	82.76%
Black or African American alone (NH)	0	0	0	0.00%	0.00%	0.00%
Native American or Alaska Native alone (NH)	3	1	0	5.36%	3.33%	0.00%
Asian alone (NH)	0	0	1	0.00%	0.00%	3.45%
Native Hawaiian or Pacific Islander alone (NH)	0	0	0	0.00%	0.00%	0.00%
Other race alone (NH)	0	0	0	0.00%	0.00%	0.00%
Mixed race or Multiracial (NH)	1	0	1	1.79%	0.00%	3.45%
Hispanic or Latino (any race)	0	0	3	0.00%	0.00%	10.34%
Total	56	30	29	100.00%	100.00%	100.00%

=== 2010 census ===
As of the census of 2010, there were 30 people, a decrease of 46.43% since 2000 (26 people). The racial makeup of the CDP was 96.67% White (29 people) and 3.33% Native American (1 person). The CDP did not have any people from Hispanic or Latino of any race.

=== 2000 census ===
As of the census of 2000, there were 56 people, 24 households, and 16 families residing in the CDP. The population density was 4.8 people per square mile (1.8/km^{2}). There were 32 housing units at an average density of 2.7/sq mi (1.1/km^{2}). The racial makeup of the CDP was 92.86% White, 5.36% Native American, and 1.79% from two or more races.

There were 24 households, out of which 29.2% had children under the age of 18 living with them, 62.5% were married couples living together, 4.2% had a female householder with no husband present, and 33.3% were non-families. 33.3% of all households were made up of individuals, and 16.7% had someone living alone who was 65 years of age or older. The average household size was 2.33 and the average family size was 3.00.

In the CDP, the population was spread out, with 26.8% under the age of 18, 1.8% from 18 to 24, 30.4% from 25 to 44, 12.5% from 45 to 64, and 28.6% who were 65 years of age or older. The median age was 38 years. For every 100 females, there were 93.1 males. For every 100 females age 18 and over, there were 105.0 males.

The median income for a household in the CDP was $27,188, and the median income for a family was $33,125. Males had a median income of $21,250 versus $33,750 for females. The per capita income for the CDP was $23,670. There were no families and 2.9% of the population living below the poverty line, including no under eighteens and none of those over 64.

== Climate ==
The climate in this area is characterized by hot, humid summers and generally mild to cool winters. According to the Köppen Climate Classification system, Elbert has a humid subtropical climate, abbreviated "Cfa" on climate maps.
