= Thornberry, Texas =

- Unincorporated community
- Location within Texas Location within the United States
- Coordinates: 34°03′29″N 98°23′21″W
- Country: United States
- State: Texas
- County: Clay
- Elevation: 1,001 ft (305 m)
- Time zone: UTC-6 (Central (CST))
  - Summer (DST): UTC-5 (CDT)
- Area code: 940
- GNIS feature ID: 1380658

Thornberry is an unincorporated community in Clay County, Texas, United States. According to the Handbook of Texas, the community had a population of 60 in 2000. It is located within the Wichita Falls metropolitan area.

== History ==
The community was first known as Illinois Colony when it was founded in 1890 by people who moved to the area from Illinois. However, it was renamed Thornberry within a few years of its inception, in honor of Amos Thornberry, a prominent settler and devoted orchardist who brought large-scale orchard-based agriculture to the county. The village had a post office by 1891, but it closed in 1908. A planned train line that would have connected Wichita Falls to Thornberry was never built. The 1930s and 1940s population list showed 20 people living there. Locally, there were two rated enterprises in the late 1940s and four in the mid-1930s. Thornberry recorded 60 residents between the late 1950s when the village had three businesses, and 2000 when it had none. The population in the community is expected to break 100 by 2057.

On August 18, 2007, an F1 tornado struck Thornberry.

== Geography ==
Thornberry is located at the intersection of Farm to Market Roads 2393 and 171, 12 mi (19 km) northeast of Wichita Falls in northwestern Clay County.

== Education ==
Thornberry is served by the Burkburnett Independent School District. It is zoned for I.C. Evans Elementary School.
