= Pancake, Texas =

- Unincorporated community
- Location within Texas Location within the United States
- Coordinates: 31°37′04″N 97°47′59″W
- Country: United States
- State: Texas
- County: Coryell
- Elevation: 1,148 ft (350 m)
- Time zone: UTC-6 (Central (CST))
  - Summer (DST): UTC-5 (CDT)
- Area code: 254
- GNIS feature ID: 1380322

Pancake is an unincorporated community in Coryell County, in the U.S. state of Texas. According to the Handbook of Texas, the community had a population of 11 in 2000. It is located within the Killeen-Temple-Fort Hood metropolitan area.

== History ==
Pancake contained a post office from 1884 until 1908, with a brief interruption. The first postmaster, John R. Pancake, gave the community its name. It was originally named Bush. Its mail delivery is now sent from Jonesboro. In 1896, the community had 200 residents, a general store, a flour mill, and a gin. Its population plunged to 25 from the 1930s to the 1960s, then to 11 in 2000.

== Geography ==
Pancake is located at the intersection of Farm to Market Roads 217 and 2955, 13 mi (21 km) northwest of Gatesville in northern Coryell County.

== Education ==
Pancake is served by the Jonesboro Independent School District.
