= Texas State Highway 236 =

State highway in Texas

State Highway 236
- SH 236, highlighted in red

Route information
- Maintained by TxDOT
- Length: 6.855 mi (11.032 km)
- Existed: 1936–present

Major junctions
- South end: SH 36 at The Grove
- North end: FM 107 at Whitson

Location
- Country: United States
- State: Texas
- Counties: Coryell

Highway system
- Highways in Texas; Interstate; US; State; Former; Toll; Loops; Spurs; FM/RM; Park; Rec
← SH 235	→ SH 237

State Highway 236 (SH 236) is a state highway in Coryell County, Texas.

== Route description ==
The southern terminus of SH 236 is at SH 36 and FM 1114 at The Grove, near the Bell County line. The highway travels to the north and briefly turns to the east before resuming a more northward trajectory as it crosses the Leon River. The route passes to the east of Mother Neff State Park, and access to the park is provided via PR 14. The SH 236 designation ends at FM 107 near the McLennan County line; the roadway continues to the north as FM 2671.

== History ==
SH 236 was originally designated on September 21, 1936, from The Grove to Moody. The segment between its current northern terminus and Moody was transferred to FM 1742 on November 21, 1951, and then to FM 107 on February 20, 1952.

== Major intersections ==
The entire route is in Coryell County.

Location	mi	km	Destinations	Notes
The Grove	0.0	0.0	SH 36 – Gatesville, Temple	Southern terminus; roadway continues as FM 1114
	5.1	8.2	PR 14 – Mother Neff State Park	
	6.9	11.1	FM 107 – Moody	Northern terminus; roadway continues as FM 2671
1.000 mi = 1.609 km; 1.000 km = 0.621 mi
