= Oglesby High School =

Location
- 125 College Avenue; Oglesby, Texas 76561-2007; United States; 31.419685°N 97.508626°W

Information
- School type: Public high school
- School district: Oglesby Independent School District
- Principal: David Maass
- Teaching staff: 21.24 (FTE)
- Grades: PK-12
- Enrollment: 204 (2023-2024)
- Student to teacher ratio: 9.60
- Colors: Red and white
- Athletics conference: UIL Class A
- Mascot: Tiger
- Website: Oglesby School website

Oglesby High School or Oglesby School is a 1A public high school located in Oglesby, Texas (USA). It is part of the Oglesby Independent School District located in far eastern Coryell County. In 2015, the school was rated "Improvement Required" by the Texas Education Agency.

== Athletics ==
The Oglesby Tigers compete in the following sports:

- Basketball
- Cross Country
- 6-Man Football
- Golf
- Tennis
- Track and Field
- Volleyball

== See also ==
- List of high schools in Texas
