= Arnett, Coryell County, Texas =

- Unincorporated community
- Location within Texas Location within the United States
- Coordinates: 31°26′43″N 97°53′29″W
- Country: United States
- State: Texas
- County: Coryell
- Elevation: 1,024 ft (312 m)
- Time zone: UTC-6 (Central (CST))
  - Summer (DST): UTC-5 (CDT)
- Area code: 254
- GNIS feature ID: 1351262

Arnett is an unincorporated community in Coryell County, in the U.S. state of Texas. According to the Handbook of Texas, the community had a population of 20 in 2000. It is located within the Killeen-Temple-Fort Hood metropolitan area.

== History ==
The Arnett area was first settled in the 1880s and may have been named for the friend of an early settler surnamed Johnson. A post office was established at Arnett in 1903 and remained in operation until 1906.

== Geography ==
Arnett is located on U.S. Highway 84, 9 mi (14 km) west of Gatesville in west-central Coryell County.

== Education ==
Arnett has been a part of the Gatesville Independent School District since the mid-1950s.
