= Coryell City, Texas =

- Unincorporated community
- Location within Texas Location within the United States
- Coordinates: 31°32′47″N 97°37′6″W
- Country: United States
- State: Texas
- County: Coryell
- Elevation: 988 ft (301 m)
- Time zone: UTC-6 (Central (CST))
  - Summer (DST): UTC-5 (CDT)
- Area code: 254
- GNIS feature ID: 1355034

Coryell City is an unincorporated community in Coryell County, in the U.S. state of Texas. According to the Handbook of Texas, the community had a population of 125 in 2000. It is located within the Killeen-Temple-Fort Hood metropolitan area.

== History ==
The population was 70 in 2010.

== Geography ==
Coryell City is located on Farm to Market Road 929, 10 mi (16 km) northeast of Gatesville, 30 mi (48 km) west of Waco, and 14 mi (23 km) west of Crawford in northeastern Coryell County.

== Education ==
Coryell City had its own school in the 1880s. Today, the community is served by the Gatesville Independent School District.
