= Ater, Texas =

- Unincorporated community
- Location within Texas Location within the United States
- Coordinates: 31°31′24″N 97°51′40″W
- Country: United States
- State: Texas
- County: Coryell
- Elevation: 843 ft (257 m)
- Time zone: UTC-6 (Central (CST))
  - Summer (DST): UTC-5 (CDT)
- Area code: 254
- GNIS feature ID: 1379371

Ater is an unincorporated community in Coryell County, in the U.S. state of Texas. According to the Handbook of Texas, the community had a population of 25 in 2000. It is located within the Killeen-Temple-Fort Hood metropolitan area.

== Geography ==
Ater is located a mile north of Farm to Market Road 2412 on the Leon River's south bank, 9 mi (14 km) northwest of Gatesville in northwestern Coryell County.

== Education ==
Ater has been a part of the Jonesboro Independent School District since 1939.
