= King, Texas =

- Unincorporated community
- Location within Texas Location within the United States
- Coordinates: 31°22′47″N 97°54′53″W
- Country: United States
- State: Texas
- County: Coryell
- Elevation: 846 ft (258 m)
- Time zone: UTC-6 (Central (CST))
  - Summer (DST): UTC-5 (CDT)
- Area code: 254
- GNIS feature ID: 1380030

King is an unincorporated community in Coryell County, in the U.S. state of Texas. According to the Handbook of Texas, the community had a population of 25 in 2000. It is located within the Killeen-Temple-Fort Hood metropolitan area.

== History ==
Established as Stringtown, the town was granted a postoffice in 1882 under their new name of King. It closed in 1953.

The population was 100 in the 1890s, and twenty-five in the 1940s. It was again reported as 25 in the year 2000.

== Geography ==
King is located on Farm to Market Road 1783 on Cowhouse Creek, 12 mi (19 km) southwest of Gatesville in west-central Coryell County.

== Education ==
King had its own school in the mid-1880s. Today, the community is served by the Gatesville Independent School District.
