= Hurst Springs, Texas =

- Unincorporated community
- Location within Texas Location within the United States
- Coordinates: 31°39′57″N 97°41′39″W
- Country: United States
- State: Texas
- County: Coryell
- Elevation: 997 ft (304 m)
- Time zone: UTC-6 (Central (CST))
  - Summer (DST): UTC-5 (CDT)
- Area code: 254
- GNIS feature ID: 2034584

Hurst Springs is an unincorporated community in Coryell County, in the U.S. state of Texas. According to the Handbook of Texas, the community had a population of 8 in 2000. It is located within the Killeen-Temple-Fort Hood metropolitan area.

== Geography ==
Hurst Springs is located on Farm to Market Road 182, 5 mi (8.0 km) northeast of Turnersville in northern Coryell County.

=== Climate ===
The climate in this area is characterized by hot, humid summers and generally mild to cool winters. According to the Köppen Climate Classification system, Hurst Springs has a humid subtropical climate, abbreviated "Cfa" on climate maps.

== Education ==
Hurst Springs had its own school in the early 1890s. Today, the community is served by the Clifton Independent School District.
