= South Purmela, Texas =

- Unincorporated community
- Location within Texas Location within the United States
- Coordinates: 31°28′12″N 97°58′20″W
- Country: United States
- State: Texas
- County: Coryell
- Elevation: 1,076 ft (328 m)
- Time zone: UTC-6 (Central (CST))
  - Summer (DST): UTC-5 (CDT)
- Area code: 254
- GNIS feature ID: 1368751

South Purmela is an unincorporated community in Coryell County, in the U.S. state of Texas. According to the Handbook of Texas, only three people lived there in 2000. It is located within the Killeen-Temple-Fort Hood metropolitan area.

== History ==
A Methodist church, several businesses, and several scattered houses were extant in the 1980s. Three people lived there in 2000.

== Geography ==
South Purmela is located at the intersection of U.S. Route 84 and Farm to Market Roads 183 and 932, 13 mi (21 km) northwest of Gatesville and 2 mi (3.2 km) south of Purmela in northwestern Coryell County.

== Education ==
Today, the community is served by the Evant Independent School District.
