= Osage, Coryell County, Texas =

- Unincorporated community
- Location within Texas Location within the United States
- Coordinates: 31°31′29″N 97°33′53″W
- Country: United States
- State: Texas
- County: Coryell
- Elevation: 856 ft (261 m)
- Time zone: UTC-6 (Central (CST))
  - Summer (DST): UTC-5 (CDT)
- Area code: 254
- GNIS feature ID: 1380313

Osage is an unincorporated community in Coryell County, in the U.S. state of Texas. According to the Handbook of Texas, the community had a population of 30 in 2000. It is located within the Killeen-Temple-Fort Hood metropolitan area.

== History ==
Osage may have been named either for the Osage Nation or the Osage Orange trees in the area. The area in what is known as Osage today was first settled in 1860. A post office was established at Osage in 1878 and remained in operation until 1965. Several general stores, a gin, and a smithy were destroyed by fire in 1936. For over a century, a Baptist church was used as the main place for worship in the community. The population was 30 from 1980 through 2000.

== Geography ==
Osage is located on Bluff Creek near the McLennan County line, 10 mi (16 km) northeast of Gatesville in eastern Coryell County.

== Education ==
Osage had its own school until it joined the Crawford Independent School District in 1947.

== See also ==
- Farm to Market Road 185
- Farm to Market Road 938
