= Ames, Coryell County, Texas =

- Unincorporated community
- Location within Texas Location within the United States
- Coordinates: 31°31′16″N 97°46′46″W
- Country: United States
- State: Texas
- County: Coryell
- Elevation: 922 ft (281 m)
- Time zone: UTC-6 (Central (CST))
  - Summer (DST): UTC-5 (CDT)
- Area code: 254
- GNIS feature ID: 1379340

Ames is an unincorporated community in Coryell County, in the U.S. state of Texas. According to the Handbook of Texas, the community had a population of 10 in 2000. It is located within the Killeen-Temple-Fort Hood metropolitan area.

== Education ==
Today, the community is served by the Gatesville Independent School District.
