= Jonesboro School =

Location
- 14909 TX-36; Jonesboro, Texas 76538; United States
- Coordinates: 31.616867°N 97.885234°W

Information
- Superintendent: Matt Dossey
- Principal: Kendra Gustin
- Teaching staff: 27.01 (FTE)
- Grades: PreK-12
- Enrollment: 319 (2023-2024)
- Student to teacher ratio: 11.81
- Colors: Black and gold
- Team name: Eagles
- Website: Official Website

Jonesboro School is a public primary, intermediate and highschool located in Jonesboro, Texas (USA) and classified as a 1A school by the UIL. It is part of the Jonesboro Independent School District located in Coryell County. In 2015, the school was rated "Improvement Required" by the Texas Education Agency.

== Athletics ==
The Jonesboro Eagles compete in the following sports:

- Basketball
- Cross Country
- Six Man Football
- Golf
- Softball
- Tennis
- Track & Field
- Volleyball

=== State Titles ===
- Softball
  - 2024 (1A), 2025 (1A), 2026 (1A)
