= Mother Neff State Park =

State park in Texas, United States

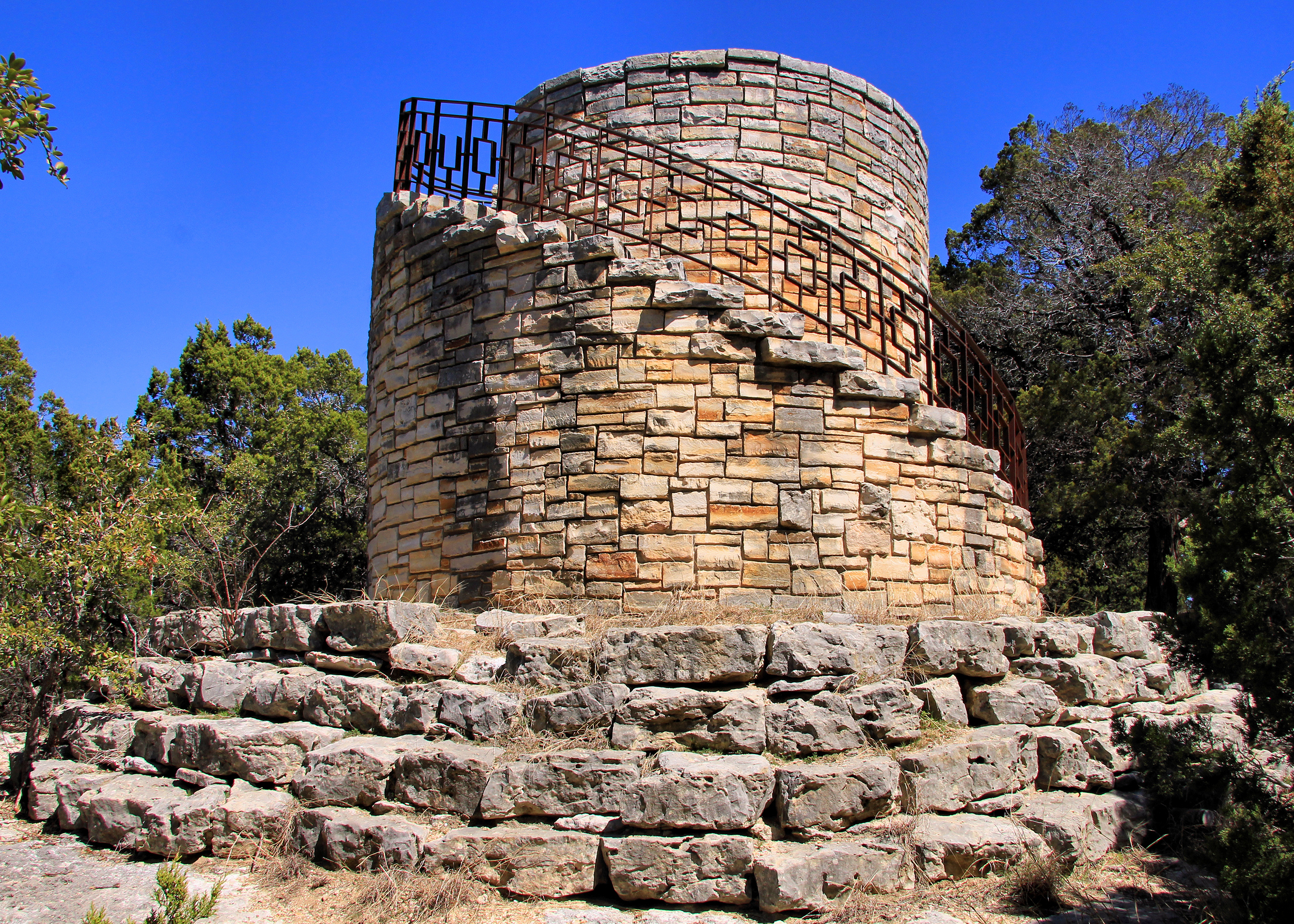
- A combination water storage tank and lookout tower at Mother Neff State Park. The tower was designed by Herman F. Cason and constructed by Civilian Conservation Corps Company 817 circa 1935.

- Location within Texas Location within the United States
- Location: Coryell County, Texas
- Nearest city: Moody
- Coordinates: 31°19′18″N 97°28′9″W
- Area: 259 acres (105 ha)
- Established: 1937
- Named for: Isabella Eleanor Neff
- Visitors: 35,825 (in 2025)
- Governing body: Texas Parks and Wildlife Department
- Website: Official site
- Mother Neff State Park and F. A. S. 21-B(1) Historic District
- U.S. National Register of Historic Places
- U.S. Historic district
- Area: 330 acres (130 ha)
- Built: 1934
- Architectural style: National Park Service Rustic
- NRHP reference No.: 92001303
- Added to NRHP: October 2, 1992

Mother Neff State Park is a 259-acre (105 ha) state park located on the Leon River west of Moody, Texas in Coryell County, Texas, United States. The park was opened to the public in 1937 and is managed by the Texas Parks and Wildlife Department.

== History ==
The park's initial 6 acres (2.4 ha) were donated by Mrs. Isabella Eleanor Neff, mother of Governor Pat Morris Neff in 1916. Upon her death in 1921, Governor Neff created the Mother Neff Memorial Park, making it the first state park in Texas. The additional land was deeded to the state in 1934 by private owners; Governor Neff deeded 250 acres (100 ha) and Mr Frank Smith deeded 3 acres (1.2 ha). The park charges a nominal entry fee for ages 13 and older.

Company 817 of the Civilian Conservation Corps built the park from 1934 to 1938. The company used local materials such as limestone and local hardwoods (oak, elm, juniper, and cottonwood) to build the entrance portals, concession club house, caretaker’s building, pump and drainage systems, fences, and picnic areas. They also built roads, trails and terraced the flood plain.

Texas F.A.S. [federally assisted secondary road] 21-B(1) (County Road 314 locally known as Old River Road or Oglesby Neff Park Road) is a 6-mile (9.7 km) length of road built in 1939. The Texas State Highway Department constructed the road using allocated federal funds. The road follows the Leon River for much of its length from the west entrance of the park to Farm to Market Road 107. The park and the road are contributing resources to Mother Neff State Park and F.A.S. 21-B(1) Historic District, which was added to the National Register of Historic Places on October 2, 1992.

Most of Mother Neff Park sits in the flood plain of the Leon River and flooding shut the park down in 1992 and 2007. Flooding in 2015 closed the lower half of the park, and the section did not reopen until September 2026. The park built a new camping loop and visitor center above the floodplain that opened in 2015.

== Geography ==
The park lies within the Lampasas Cut Plain (or Limestone Cut Plain) level IV ecoregion. Characteristics of the Washita Prairie (a subregion of the Grand Prairie level IV ecoregion) and the Northern Blackland Prairie level IV ecoregion can also be found in the park. This creates four habitats: Leon River bottomlands; lower ravines; higher ravines; and upper prairie, each with differing plant life.

== Facilities ==
For overnight stays, there are twenty camping sites useable for tents or recreational vehicles that have connections to electricity, water and sewage. There are about three miles of hiking trails with a bird blind along one trail. Other activities available are picnicking, birding and geocaching.

== Nature ==
=== Animals ===
Mammals found in the park include white-tailed deer, eastern fox squirrel, eastern cottontail and racoon. Common birds in the park include northern cardinal, painted bunting, house sparrow, Carolina chickadee, canyon wren, black vulture and turkey vulture.

=== Flora ===
Common trees documented are Ashe juniper, honey mesquite, bastard oak, Texas live oak, Texas red oak and Mexican plum. Plants in the understory include prairie flameleaf sumac, frostweed, prickly pear cactus and poison ivy

== See also ==
- List of Texas state parks
- National Register of Historic Places listings in Coryell County, Texas
