= Crawford High School (Crawford, Texas) =

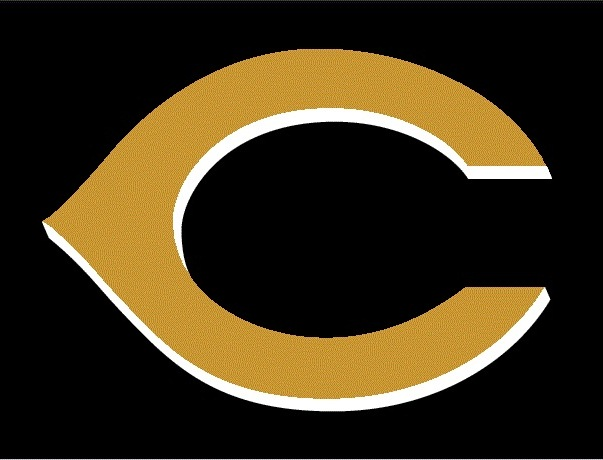
- Crawford (Texas) High School logo C

Location
- 200 Pirate Drive; Crawford, Texas 76638-0120; United States; 31.5312°N 97.4516°W

Information
- School type: Public high school
- School district: Crawford Independent School District
- Superintendent: Kenneth Hall
- Principal: Eli Klanika
- Staff: 31.50 (on an FTE basis)
- Grades: 6–12
- Enrollment: 326 (2023–24)
- Student to teacher ratio: 10.35
- Colors: Black & Gold
- Athletics conference: UIL Class AA
- Mascot: Pirate/Lady Pirate
- Yearbook: The Pirate
- Website: Crawford High School

Crawford High School is a 2A high school located in Crawford, Texas (USA). It is part of the Crawford Independent School District located in northwestern McLennan County. In 2011, the school was rated "Recognized" by the Texas Education Agency. U.S. president George W. Bush and Russian president Vladimir Putin visited the school in November 2001, shortly before visiting nearby Prairie Chapel Ranch.

== Athletics ==
The Crawford Pirates compete in the following sports -

Cross Country, Football, Volleyball, Basketball, Powerlifting, Golf, Track, Tennis, Softball, and Baseball

=== Team State Titles ===
- Football -
  - 2004 (2A/D2)
- Girls Basketball -
  - 1975 (B)
- Girls Cross Country -
  - 1998 (2A), 1999 (2A)
- Softball -
  - 2012 (2A), 2014 (2A), 2019 (2A), 2022 (2A)
- Volleyball -
  - 2017 (2A), 2019 (2A), 2024 (2A/D2)

=== Individual State Champions ===
- Seth Kolscheen, 2019 Boys Class 2A Powerlifting Heavyweight Division
- Seth Kolscheen, 2018 Boys Class 2A Powerlifting Heavyweight Division
- Ann-Marie Dunlap, 2014 Girls Class 2A 3200 Meter Run
- Ann-Marie Dunlap, 2014 Girls Class 2A 1600 Meter Run
- Ann-Marie Dunlap, 2013 Girls Class 2A Cross Country
  - Set State Record
- Ann-Marie Dunlap, 2012 Girls Class 2A Cross Country
- Jake Blenden, 2012 Boys Class 2A Golf
