= Topsey, Texas =

- Unincorporated community
- Location within Texas Location within the United States
- Coordinates: 31°13′9″N 97°59′6″W
- Country: United States
- State: Texas
- County: Coryell
- Elevation: 1,043 ft (318 m)
- Time zone: UTC-6 (Central (CST))
  - Summer (DST): UTC-5 (CDT)
- Area code: 254
- GNIS feature ID: 1370019

Topsey is an unincorporated community in Coryell County, in the U.S. state of Texas. According to the Handbook of Texas, the community had a population of 20 in 2000. It is located within the Killeen-Temple-Fort Hood metropolitan area.

== Geography ==
Topsey is located on Farm to Market Roads 580 and 1113, 22 mi (35 km) southwest of Gatesville, 8 mi (13 km) northwest of Copperas Cove, and 20 mi (32 km) northeast of Lampasas in southwestern Coryell County.

== Education ==
Today, the community is served by the Copperas Cove Independent School District. It is zoned for House Creek Elementary School, S C Lee J Junior High School, and Copperas Cove High School.
