= South Mountain, Texas =

- Town
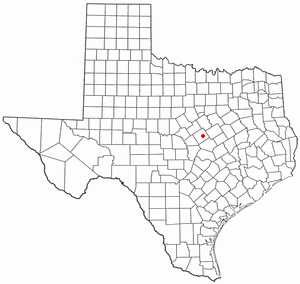
- Location of South Mountain, Texas

- Coordinates: 31°26′23″N 97°40′45″W
- Country: United States
- State: Texas
- County: Coryell

Area
  - Total: 1.61 sq mi (4.18 km^{2})
  - Land: 1.61 sq mi (4.18 km^{2})
  - Water: 0 sq mi (0.00 km^{2})
- Elevation: 1,037 ft (316 m)

Population (2020)
  - Total: 411
  - Estimate (2022): 417
  - Density: 226.2/sq mi (87.35/km^{2})
- Time zone: UTC-6 (Central (CST))
  - Summer (DST): UTC-5 (CDT)
- FIPS code: 48-69120
- GNIS feature ID: 2413308

South Mountain is a town in Coryell County, Texas, United States. As of the 2020 census, South Mountain had a population of 411. It is part of the Killeen–Temple–Fort Hood Metropolitan Statistical Area.

== Geography ==
South Mountain is located along U.S. Route 84. It is 4 miles (6 km) east of the center of Gatesville and 16 miles (26 km) west of McGregor.

According to the United States Census Bureau, the town of South Mountain has a total area of 1.6 square miles (4.2 km^{2}), all land.

== Demographics ==
Historical population
Census	Pop.	Note	%±
1990	301		—
2000	412		36.9%
2010	384		−6.8%
2020	411		7.0%
2022 (est.)	417	▲	1.5%
U.S. Decennial Census

As of the census of 2000, there were 412 people, 146 households, and 121 families residing in the town. The population density was 252.9 inhabitants per square mile (97.6/km^{2}). There were 161 housing units at an average density of 98.8 per square mile (38.1/km^{2}). The racial makeup of the town was 86.89% White, 1.94% African American, 3.40% Asian, 7.04% from other races, and 0.73% from two or more races. Hispanic or Latino of any race were 9.47% of the population.

There were 146 households, out of which 41.1% had children under the age of 18 living with them, 71.2% were married couples living together, 7.5% had a female householder with no husband present, and 17.1% were non-families. 13.0% of all households were made up of individuals, and 2.7% had someone living alone who was 65 years of age or older. The average household size was 2.82 and the average family size was 3.08.

In the town, the population was spread out, with 28.9% under the age of 18, 7.5% from 18 to 24, 24.8% from 25 to 44, 26.5% from 45 to 64, and 12.4% who were 65 years of age or older. The median age was 37 years. For every 100 females, there were 93.4 males. For every 100 females age 18 and over, there were 94.0 males.

The median income for a household in the town was $31,250, and the median income for a family was $34,688. Males had a median income of $24,625 versus $18,333 for females. The per capita income for the town was $14,863. About 10.3% of families and 6.7% of the population were below the poverty line, including 2.4% of those under age 18 and 7.7% of those age 65 or over.

== Education ==
The Gatesville Independent School District is the area school district.

All of the county is in the service area of Central Texas College.
