= Purmela, Texas =

- Unincorporated community
- Location within the state of Texas Purmela (the United States)
- Coordinates: 31°29′02″N 97°57′44″W
- Country: United States
- State: Texas
- County: Coryell
- Time zone: UTC-6 (Central (CST))
  - Summer (DST): UTC-5 (CDT)
- ZIP codes: 76566
- GNIS feature ID: 1365866

Purmela is an unincorporated community in Coryell County, Texas, United States. The community is part of the Killeen–Temple–Fort Hood Metropolitan Statistical Area.

== History ==
Martin Dremien, a business owner who later served as the postmaster after the post office was authorized in 1879, founded it. The postal service made a mistake when Dremien attempted to have the town named after his sweetheart, Furmela, a local source claims; as a result, Dremien was claimed to have sold his business and gone to another state. In the 1950s and for the majority of the 1960s, the village had 125 residents, but by 1968 and 1970, that number had dropped to 65 and 40, respectively. In the 1980s, Purmela had a chapel and a post office; in 1990, 61 people were living there. The population remained the same in 2000.

Although it is unincorporated, Purmela has a post office with the ZIP code 76566.

== Geography ==
Purmela is located near the intersection of Farm to Market Roads 932 and 1241, 13 mi (21 km) northwest of Gatesville in northwestern Coryell County. South Purmela is two miles south.

=== Climate ===
The climate in this area is characterized by hot, humid summers and generally mild to cool winters. According to the Köppen climate classification system, Purmela has a humid subtropical climate, Cfa on climate maps.

On May 21, 2011, an EF0 tornado briefly hit Purmela and downed a few trees.

== Education ==
The Basham, Sycamore, and Evergreen schools were combined to become the Purmela school district in 1901. Sometime after 1950, Purmela School joined the Gatesville Independent School District. Today, the community is served by the Evant Independent School District.
