= Flat, Texas =

- Unincorporated community
- Location in Texas Flat (the United States)
- Coordinates: 31°18′32″N 97°37′48″W
- Country: United States
- State: Texas
- County: Coryell
- Established: 1897

Area
  - Total: 0.98 sq mi (2.54 km^{2})
- Elevation: 833 ft (254 m)

Population (2020)
  - Total: 157
- Time zone: UTC-6 (CST)
  - Summer (DST): UTC-5 (CDT)
- ZIP Code: 76526
- Area code: 254
- GNIS feature ID: 1357417

Flat is a small unincorporated community in Coryell County, Texas, United States. As of the 2020 census, Flat had a population of 157. It is part of the Killeen–Temple–Fort Hood metropolitan statistical area.

== History ==
The area was originally titled "Mesquite Flat" when the town applied for its own post office. The application was rejected, and resubmitted as "Flat". The post office was successfully opened in 1897; its ZIP code is 76526.

In 1914, Flat had a thriving population of 100, with three general stores and a cotton gin. By the mid-1920s, population estimates fell to 25. In the late 1930s, the population had rebounded to 125. With the establishment of Fort Hood in 1942, much of the town's cropland was converted into a military base. In 1960, the population was 200. The Flat school merged with Gatesville ISD in 1963. In 1970, the population was 210. As of 2000, the population was 861. From 2000-2020, the population decreased, to a total of 157.

== Climate ==
The climate in this area is characterized by hot, humid summers and generally mild to cool winters. According to the Köppen climate classification, Flat has a humid subtropical climate, Cfa on climate maps.

== Demographics ==
Historical population
| Census | Pop. | Note | %± |
|---|---|---|---|
| 2020 | 157 | | — |
U.S. Decennial Census; 1850–1900 1910; 1920 1930 1940; 1950 1960 1970; 1980 1990 2000; 2010 2020

Flat first appeared as a census designated place in the 2020 U.S. census.

=== 2020 Census ===
Flat CDP, Texas – Racial and ethnic composition Note: the US Census treats Hispanic/Latino as an ethnic category. This table excludes Latinos from the racial categories and assigns them to a separate category. Hispanics/Latinos may be of any race.
| Race / Ethnicity (NH = Non-Hispanic) | Pop 2020 | % 2020 |
|---|---|---|
| White alone (NH) | 138 | 87.90% |
| Black or African American alone (NH) | 3 | 1.91% |
| Native American or Alaska Native alone (NH) | 1 | 0.64% |
| Asian alone (NH) | 0 | 0.00% |
| Native Hawaiian or Pacific Islander alone (NH) | 0 | 0.00% |
| Other race alone (NH) | 0 | 0.00% |
| Mixed race or Multiracial (NH) | 4 | 2.55% |
| Hispanic or Latino (any race) | 11 | 7.01% |
| Total | 157 | 100.00% |

== Education ==
The Gatesville Independent School District is the area school district.

All of the county is in the service area of Central Texas College.
