= Oglesby Independent School District =

School district in Texas

Coordinates: 31.4207°N 97.5121°W

Oglesby Independent School District is a public school district based in Oglesby, Texas (USA).

Located in Coryell County, a small portion of the district extends into McLennan County.

The district operates one school Oglesby School serving grades K-12.

== Academic achievement ==
In 2009, the school district was rated "academically acceptable" by the Texas Education Agency.

== Special programs ==
=== Athletics ===
Oglesby High School plays six-man football.

== See also ==
- List of school districts in Texas
- List of high schools in Texas
