= Mound, Texas =

- Unincorporated community Census designated place
- Location within the state of Texas Mound (the United States)
- Coordinates: 31°21′02″N 97°38′35″W
- Country: United States
- State: Texas
- County: Coryell

Area
  - Total: 0.71 sq mi (1.85 km^{2})
- Elevation: 686 ft (209 m)
- Time zone: UTC-6 (Central (CST))
  - Summer (DST): UTC-5 (CDT)
- ZIP codes: 76558
- GNIS feature ID: 2805769

Mound is an unincorporated community and census designated place (CDP) in Coryell County, Texas, United States. Its elevation is 692 feet (211 m). Although Mound is unincorporated, it has a post office, with the ZIP code of 76558.

Mound was settled early in the 1850s, before most other communities in Coryell County; despite this, it did not receive a railroad line until 1882 or a post office until 1884. Although Mound was long a center of education (it was named for the local White Mound School), in 1971 its schools were merged into the Gatesville Independent School District. Today, FM 1829 passes through Mound.

As of 2020, the population of Mound was 174.

== Demographics ==
Historical population
Census	Pop.	Note	%±
2020	174		—
U.S. Decennial Census; 1850–1900 1910; 1920 1930 1940; 1950 1960 1970; 1980 1990 2000; 2010 2020

Mound first appeared as a census designated place in the 2020 U.S. census.

=== 2020 Census ===
Mound CDP, Texas – Racial and ethnic composition Note: the US Census treats Hispanic/Latino as an ethnic category. This table excludes Latinos from the racial categories and assigns them to a separate category. Hispanics/Latinos may be of any race.
Race / Ethnicity (NH = Non-Hispanic)	Pop 2020	% 2020
White alone (NH)	147	84.48%
Black or African American alone (NH)	1	0.57%
Native American or Alaska Native alone (NH)	1	0.57%
Asian alone (NH)	0	0.00%
Native Hawaiian or Pacific Islander alone (NH)	0	0.00%
Other race alone (NH)	0	0.00%
Mixed race or Multiracial (NH)	13	7.47%
Hispanic or Latino (any race)	12	6.90%
Total	174	100.00%

== Education ==
The Gatesville Independent School District is the area school district.

All of the county is in the service area of Central Texas College.
