= Bee House, Texas =

- Unincorporated community
- Location within Texas Location within the United States
- Coordinates: 31°24′10″N 98°04′52″W
- Country: United States
- State: Texas
- County: Coryell
- Elevation: 1,178 ft (359 m)
- Time zone: UTC-6 (Central (CST))
  - Summer (DST): UTC-5 (CDT)
- ZIP codes: 76512
- Area code: 254
- GNIS feature ID: 1351771

Bee House is an unincorporated community in Coryell County, Texas, United States. According to the Handbook of Texas, the community had a population of 40 in 2000. It is located within the Killeen-Temple-Fort Hood metropolitan area.

== History ==
Founded in the 1850s, the community was originally named Boyd's Cove for James Boyd. The community's post office opened in 1884; residents wanted the post office to be named Bee Hive for the bees found in nearby caves and cliffs, but the U.S. Postal Service named it Bee House instead. In the mid-1880s, Bee House had 150 residents served by a general store, a corn mill, and four churches. The community also had a Masonic lodge until 1916. The population went down to 50 in 1940. The community still had a church and post office as of the 1980s. Its population was 40 in 1990 and 2000.

== Geography ==
Bee House is located on Farm to Market Road 183, 11 miles (18 km) west of Gatesville in western Coryell County. It is also located 49 mi (79 km) west of Waco.

== Education ==
In 1904, Bee House had a school with 78 students and two teachers and was two stories tall. Today, the community is served by the Evant Independent School District.
