= Oglesby, Texas =

- City
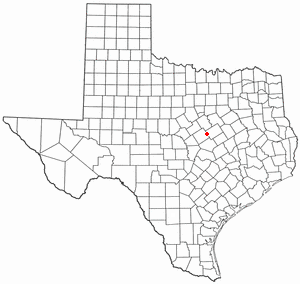
- Location of Oglesby, Texas

- Coordinates: 31°25′07″N 97°30′41″W
- Country: United States
- State: Texas
- County: Coryell

Area
  - Total: 0.51 sq mi (1.32 km^{2})
  - Land: 0.51 sq mi (1.32 km^{2})
  - Water: 0 sq mi (0.00 km^{2})
- Elevation: 853 ft (260 m)

Population (2020)
  - Total: 441
  - Estimate (2022): 433
  - Density: 910.3/sq mi (351.48/km^{2})
- Time zone: UTC-6 (Central (CST))
  - Summer (DST): UTC-5 (CDT)
- ZIP code: 76561
- Area code: 254
- FIPS code: 48-53520
- GNIS feature ID: 2411306

Oglesby is a city in Coryell County, Texas, United States. As of the 2020 census, Oglesby had a population of 441. It is part of the Killeen–Temple–Fort Hood Metropolitan Statistical Area.

== Geography ==
Oglesby is located in eastern Coryell County 7 miles (11 km) west of McGregor and 15 miles (24 km) east of Gatesville.

According to the United States Census Bureau, the city has a total area of 0.50 square miles (1.3 km^{2}), all land.

== Demographics ==
Historical population
Census	Pop.	Note	%±
1960	414		—
1970	440		6.3%
1980	470		6.8%
1990	452		−3.8%
2000	458		1.3%
2010	484		5.7%
2020	441		−8.9%
2022 (est.)	433		−1.8%
U.S. Decennial Census

=== 2020 census ===
As of the 2020 census, Oglesby had a population of 441. The median age was 41.3 years. 22.0% of residents were under the age of 18 and 23.1% of residents were 65 years of age or older. For every 100 females there were 90.9 males, and for every 100 females age 18 and over there were 90.1 males age 18 and over.

There were 175 households in Oglesby, of which 31.4% had children under the age of 18 living in them. Of all households, 44.0% were married-couple households, 20.0% were households with a male householder and no spouse or partner present, and 29.7% were households with a female householder and no spouse or partner present. About 22.3% of all households were made up of individuals and 14.3% had someone living alone who was 65 years of age or older.

There were 203 housing units, of which 13.8% were vacant. The homeowner vacancy rate was 1.5% and the rental vacancy rate was 0.0%.

0.0% of residents lived in urban areas, while 100.0% lived in rural areas.

Racial composition as of the 2020 census
Race	Number	Percent
White	352	79.8%
Black or African American	5	1.1%
American Indian and Alaska Native	2	0.5%
Asian	2	0.5%
Native Hawaiian and Other Pacific Islander	0	0.0%
Some other race	43	9.8%
Two or more races	37	8.4%
Hispanic or Latino (of any race)	105	23.8%

=== 2000 census ===
As of the 2000 census, there were 458 people, 174 households, and 120 families residing in the city. The population density was 930.1 inhabitants per square mile (359.1/km^{2}). There were 194 housing units at an average density of 394.0 per square mile (152.1/km^{2}). The racial makeup of the city was 91.70% White, 1.53% Native American, 6.55% from other races, and 0.22% from two or more races. Hispanic or Latino of any race were 11.35% of the population.

There were 174 households, out of which 36.2% had children under the age of 18 living with them, 51.1% were married couples living together, 11.5% had a female householder with no husband present, and 30.5% were non-families. 28.7% of all households were made up of individuals, and 19.5% had someone living alone who was 65 years of age or older. The average household size was 2.63 and the average family size was 3.24.

In the city, the population was spread out, with 28.4% under the age of 18, 8.1% from 18 to 24, 26.9% from 25 to 44, 23.6% from 45 to 64, and 13.1% who were 65 years of age or older. The median age was 36 years. For every 100 females, there were 90.0 males. For every 100 females age 18 and over, there were 83.2 males.

The median income for a household in the city was $26,429, and the median income for a family was $35,000. Males had a median income of $27,500 versus $18,056 for females. The per capita income for the city was $17,433. About 9.8% of families and 13.1% of the population were below the poverty line, including 15.7% of those under age 18 and 20.3% of those age 65 or over.

== Education ==
The city is served by the Oglesby Independent School District and is home to the Oglesby School Tigers.
