= List of Farm to Market Roads in Texas (100–199) =

- Texas Farm to Market Road and Ranch to Market Road markers

Highway names
- Interstates: Interstate Highway X (IH-X, I-X)
- US Highways: U.S. Highway X (US X)
- State: State Highway X (SH X)
- Loops: Loop X
- Spurs: Spur X
- Recreational: Recreational Road X (RE X)
- Farm or Ranch to Market Roads: Farm to Market Road X (FM X); Ranch to Market Road X (RM X)
- Park Roads: Park Road X (PR X)

System links
- Highways in Texas; Interstate; US; State; Former; Toll; Loops; Spurs; FM/RM; Park; Rec

Farm to Market Roads in Texas are owned and maintained by the Texas Department of Transportation (TxDOT).

== FM 100 ==
Farm to Market Road 100
- Location: Fannin County
- Length: 17.440 mi (Note: The certified length given is shorter than the actual mileage, as the Texas Department of Transportation description of FM 100 considers it to be discontinuous at rather than concurrent with SH 34.) (28.067 km)
- Existed: 1944–present

Farm to Market Road 100 (FM 100) is located in Fannin County.

FM 100 begins at an intersection with SH 56 in Honey Grove. The highway travels in a northern direction through the town along 5th Street, turning west then back north near Oakwood Cemetery, leaving Honey Grove just north of US 82; the section of FM 100 between SH 56 and US 82 is overlapped with SH 34. North of Honey Grove, FM 100 travels near the eastern edge of Caddo National Grassland and Lake Crockett. The highway ends at County Road 2180, where the designation becomes FM 79.

FM 100 was designated on May 18, 1944, from Honey Grove north to Monkstown. On July 25, 1951, it was extended north to its current northern terminus. This was part of SH 34 before 1939.

Junction list

The entire route is in Fannin County.

Location	mi	km	Destinations	Notes
Honey Grove	0.0	0.0	SH 34 south / SH 56 – Ladonia, Bonham, Paris	South end of SH 34 overlap
Honey Grove	1.1	1.8	US 82 / SH 34 – Bonham, Paris	US 82 exit 686; north end of SH 34 overlap
Sash	10.4	16.7	FM 2216 east – Tigertown	
	10.9	17.5	FM 409 west – Lake Crockett, Coffee Mill Lake	
Monkstown	14.9	24.0	FM 273 west – Telephone	
Riverby	18.4	29.6	FM 79 east	
1.000 mi = 1.609 km; 1.000 km = 0.621 mi: Concurrency terminus

== FM 101 ==
Farm to Market Road 101
- Location: Eastland County
- Length: 8.397 mi (13.514 km)
- Existed: 1944–present

Farm to Market Road 101 (FM 101) is located in Eastland County. The road begins at SH 112 in Morton Valley and continues eastward to Loop 254 in Ranger.

FM 101 was designated on May 18, 1944, along the current route.

Junction list

The entire route is in Eastland County.

Location	mi	km	Destinations	Notes
Morton Valley	0.0	0.0	SH 112 – Eastland	
	1.7	2.7	FM 1852 north	
Ranger	8.2	13.2	FM 717 north (Austin Street) – Caddo	
Ranger	8.4	13.5	Loop 254 – Weatherford, Eastland	
1.000 mi = 1.609 km; 1.000 km = 0.621 mi

== FM 102 ==
Farm to Market Road 102
- Location: Wharton and Colorado counties
- Length: 38.845 mi (62.515 km)
- Existed: 1944–present

Farm to Market Road 102 (FM 102) is located in Wharton and Colorado counties. It runs from US 59/future I-69 in Wharton to I-10 near Alleyton. It continued to SH 60 until September 25, 2025, then that section east of US 59/future I-69 was given to the city of Wharton.

== FM 103 ==
Farm to Market Road 103
- Location: Montague County
- Length: 19.975 mi (32.147 km)
- Existed: 1944–present

Farm to Market Road 103 (FM 103) is located in northern Montague County. Beginning at US 82 in Nocona, it runs north, east, and south to FM 2953 northeast of Lake Nocona. A 0.3-mile-long (0.5 km) spur connection is located in the unincorporated community of Spanish Fort.

FM 103 was designated on May 18, 1944, from Nocona northward 9.5 miles (15.3 km). The route was extended to Spanish Fort on November 23, 1948. On December 20, 1988, it was extended to the intersection with FM 2953. On April 25, 1996, the spur connection was added.

== FM 104 ==
Farm to Market Road 104
- Location: Hardeman and Cottle counties
- Length: 39.937 mi (64.272 km)
- Existed: 1944–present

Farm to Market Road 104 (FM 104) is located in Cottle and Hardeman counties. It begins east of Paducah at US 70 and runs north and then east to SH 6 at Quanah.

FM 104 was designated on May 18, 1944, along the current route.

== FM 105 ==
Farm to Market Road 105
- Location: Jasper and Orange counties
- Length: 37.098 mi (59.703 km)
- Existed: May 18, 1944–present

Farm to Market Road 105 (FM 105) is located in Jasper and Orange counties. The road runs from US 96 to FM 1006.

FM 105 was designated on May 18, 1944, from Vidor north to the Jasper County line. On October 25, 1947, it was extended north to Evadale. On December 16, 1948, the designation was extended southeast to FM 408 and FM 409 at Orangefield. On January 29, 1953, FM 105 was extended east to SH 87, replacing FM 409. On December 19, 1962, the road was extended north over a former alignment of US 96 to that route's new location. On August 15, 1965, it was extended east and south to FM 1006.

== FM 106 ==
Farm to Market Road 106
- Location: Cameron County
- Length: 14.829 mi (23.865 km)
- Existed: June 22, 1944–present

Farm to Market Road 106 (FM 106) is located in Cameron County. It runs from Loop 499 to FM 510.

FM 106 was designated on June 22, 1944, from Harlingen to Rio Hondo. On July 3, 1945, the road was extended east and north to the Arroyo Colorado. On December 10, 1946, the eastern terminus was shorted to 1.8 miles (2.9 km) south of Arroyo Colorado. On July 1, 1959, the section from FM 507 south to US 77 was transferred to FM 507, the section from FM 507 east to Harlingen Air Force Base Access Road was cancelled, and the section from Harlingen Air Force Base Access Road east to FM 1595 was transferred to new FM 1595, while FM 106 was routed over old FM 1595. On November 10, 1967, the road was extended to FM 1847, replacing a section of FM 803 and a section of FM 2358 (which was decommissioned as the other section was transferred to FM 1847); a section of FM 106 from FM 803 north 5 miles (8.0 km) was transferred to FM 2925. On August 4, 1988, the section from Loop 448 (now Bus. US 77) to Loop 499 was transferred to Spur 206. On August 29, 1989, the road was extended east and south to FM 510. On June 27, 1995, the section from Loop 499 to FM 509 was transferred to Urban Road 106 (UR 106). The designation reverted to FM 106 with the elimination of the Urban Road system on November 15, 2018.

== FM 107 ==
Farm to Market Road 107
- Location: Coryell, McLennan, and Falls counties
- Length: 30.136 mi (48.499 km)
- Existed: May 18, 1944–present

Farm to Market Road 107 (FM 107) is located in Coryell, McLennan, and Falls counties. The road begins at SH 36 southeast of Gatesville and heads southeastward via Moody to I-35 in Eddy.

FM 107 was designated on May 18, 1944, from SH 7 in Chilton to US 81 in Eddy. On November 23, 1948, FM 107 was extended west to SH 317 in Moody. On February 20, 1952, FM 107 was extended west and north to US 84, replacing FM 1742 (which replaced the section of SH 236 from Moody to Mother Neff State Park on November 20, 1951). On October 14, 1960, the section of FM 107 from US 84 south to what was then FM 1996 was renumbered as FM 1996. Old FM 1996 was cancelled and transferred to FM 107. On July 31, 1975, the section east of I-35 began to be signed (but not designated) as SH 7, and the section east of US 77 was signed as Bus. SH 7. On August 29, 1990, the section from I-35 to US 77 was officially transferred to SH 7. On October 25, 1990, the section from US 77 to SH 7 was officially redesignated as Bus. SH 7.

== FM 108 ==
Farm to Market Road 108
- Location: Gonzales and DeWitt counties
- Length: 35.007 mi (56.338 km)
- Existed: May 18, 1944–present

Farm to Market Road 108 (FM 108) is located in Gonzales and DeWitt counties. It runs from SH 97 to SH 119.

FM 108 was designated on May 18, 1944, from Smiley to Gonzales to connect with SH 200 (now SH 97). On July 14, 1949, the road was extended southwest 1.6 miles (2.6 km) from Smiley. On September 28, 1950, the road was extended southeast to SH 119, replacing FM 1534.

== FM 109 ==
Farm to Market Road 109
- Location: Washington, Austin, and Colorado counties
- Length: 34.245 mi (55.112 km)
- Existed: August 1, 1944–present

Farm to Market Road 109 (FM 109) is located in Washington, Austin, and Colorado counties. It runs from SH 36 near Brenham to SH 71 near Columbus.

== FM 110 ==
Farm to Market Road 110
- Location: Caldwell and Hays counties
- Length: 13.586 mi (21.865 km)
- Existed: April 1, 1986–present

Farm to Market Road 110 (FM 110) is located in Caldwell and Hays counties. The designation begins at I-35 northeast of San Marcos and heads southeastward and southwestward back to I-35 southwest of San Marcos.

The southern segment, from I-35 to SH 80, was completed by 2018. Construction of the northern segment began in March 2022, and the roadway opened to traffic in December 2023.

=== FM 110 (1944) ===
Farm to Market Road 110
- Location: Johnson County
- Existed: August 1, 1944–February 25, 1985

A previous route numbered FM 110 was designated on August 1, 1944, from Cleburne to Grandview. FM 110 was cancelled on February 25, 1985, and transferred to FM 4.

== FM 111 ==
Farm to Market Road 111
- Location: Burleson County
- Length: 8.338 mi (13.419 km)
- Existed: December 19, 1969–present

Farm to Market Road 111 (FM 111) is located in Burleson County. The road was designated on December 19, 1969, from a county road south of Caldwell south across FM 60 at Deanville to a county road. The route was formerly FM 2618, a portion of which had been a spur off the original FM 111.

=== FM 111 (1944) ===
Farm to Market Road 111
- Location: Burleson County
- Existed: August 1, 1944–December 19, 1969

A previous route numbered FM 111 was designated on August 1, 1944, from SH 21 west of Caldwell to Deanville. On November 20, 1951, the road was extended southeast to FM 976. On January 18, 1955, the road was shortened slightly when the section from the eastern terminus (at FM 976) to 0.4 miles (0.64 km) southwest was transferred to FM 976, and a spur connection to Deanville was added. This spur connection was transferred to FM 2618 on November 24, 1959. On May 2, 1962, the section that was lost in 1955 was added back and the road was extended southeast 2.7 miles (4.3 km) through Birch to a road intersection. FM 111 was cancelled on December 19, 1969, and transferred to FM 60.

== FM 112 ==
Farm to Market Road 112
- Location: Williamson, Milam, and Lee counties
- Length: 27.264 mi (43.877 km)
- Existed: October 24, 1944–present

Farm to Market Road 112 (FM 112) is located in Williamson, Milam, and Lee counties. It runs from SH 95 in Taylor to FM 696 west of Lexington.

FM 112 was designated on October 24, 1944, from Lexington to Taylor as a replacement for SH 102. On September 27, 1960, the section from FM 696 to Loop 123 was transferred to FM 696.

== FM 113 ==
Farm to Market Road 113
- Location: Parker County
- Length: 16.907 mi (27.209 km)
- Existed: 1944–present

Farm to Market Road 113 (FM 113) is located in Parker County. It runs from FM 1885 via Garner to US 180, and from another point on US 180 via Millsap to I-20.

FM 113 was designated on October 24, 1944, from US 180 to Millsap. On May 23, 1951, the road was extended south to US 80. On February 6, 1953, the road was extended north to Garner, replacing FM 1544. On May 2, 1962, the road was extended to FM 1885.

== FM 114 ==
Farm to Market Road 114
- Location: Red River and Bowie counties
- Length: 22.207 mi (35.739 km)
- Existed: 1944–present

Farm to Market Road 114 (FM 114) is located in Red River and Bowie counties. It runs from US 82 east of Clarksville to US 259.

FM 114 was designated on December 12, 1944, from US 82 1.5 miles (2.4 km) east of Clarksville east to English and south to US 82 2 miles (3.2 km) south of Avery. On September 20, 1961, the section south of English was transferred to FM 1699; the road was rerouted east to end at FM 1326. On May 1, 1964, the road was extended east to US 259, replacing a section of FM 1326.

== FM 115 ==
Farm to Market Road 115
- Location: Franklin and Wood counties
- Length: 16.746 mi (26.950 km)
- Existed: 1944–present

Farm to Market Road 115 (FM 115) is located in Franklin and Wood counties. It runs from I-30 south of Mount Vernon to SH 11.

FM 115 was designated on December 12, 1944, from FM 21 near Hopewell southward 7.0 miles (11.3 km) to a point opposite the main Tidewater Camp in the Clearwater Oil Field. On June 11, 1948, FM 115 was extended south to SH 11. On June 23, 1967, FM 115 was rerouted from 6.7 miles (10.8 km) miles north of SH 11 to I-30, replacing the old FM 2723. The old route from FM 21 southward 4.6 miles (7.4 km) was renumbered new FM 2723, the section from 6.3 miles (10.1 km) north of SH 11 northeast 1.3 miles (2.1 km) was renumbered FM 3007, and the remainder of the old route was inundated by the reservoir.

== FM 116 ==
Farm to Market Road 116
- Location: Coryell and Bell counties
- Length: 27.852 mi (44.823 km)
- Existed: 1944–present

Farm to Market Road 116 (FM 116) is located in Coryell and Bell counties. It runs from US 84 west of Gatesville to I-14/US 190 in Copperas Cove, and from another point on I-14/US 190 in Copperas Cove to a county road.

FM 116 was designated on August 1, 1944, from US 84 west of Gatesville to US 190 (now Bus. US 190) in Copperas Cove. On May 5, 1966, FM 116 was extended south 3.2 miles (5.1 km) to the Coryell–Bell county line. On June 2, 1967, FM 116 was extended south 0.2 miles (0.32 km) miles into Bell County. On September 26, 1989, FM 116 was realigned to continue from FM 1113 south on North First and east on Avenue F in Copperas Cove to meet its old routing, while the old routing of FM 116 on North Main from FM 1113 to Avenue F was given to the city of Copperas Cove. On June 27, 1995, the section of FM 116 from FM 1113 to the current south end was transferred to Urban Road 116 (UR 116). The designation reverted to FM 116 with the elimination of the Urban Road system on November 15, 2018.

== FM 117 ==
Farm to Market Road 117
- Location: Uvalde, Zavala, and Frio counties
- Length: 59.202 mi (95.276 km)
- Existed: 1945–present

Farm to Market Road 117 (FM 117) is located in Uvalde, Zavala, and Frio counties. It runs from US 83 in Uvalde southeast to Business I-35, then concurrent with Business I-35 to SH 85, and concurrent with SH 85 0.5 miles (0.80 km), and then southeast from SH 85 to the Frio–LaSalle county line.

FM 117 was designated on January 11, 1945, from US 83 in Uvalde southeastward via Batesville to the end of pavement 4.8 miles (7.7 km) miles southeast of Batesville, replacing part of SH 55, which was truncated to end in Uvalde. On August 25, 1949, FM 117 was extended southeast to US 81 (now Business I-35), replacing FM 471. On June 28, 1963, FM 117 was extended southeast 2.8 miles (4.5 km) to the Frio–LaSalle county line, its current terminus.

== FM 118 ==
Farm to Market Road 118
- Location: Hunt County
- Length: 11.363 mi (18.287 km)
- Existed: January 11, 1945–present

Farm to Market Road 118 (FM 118) is located in Hunt County. Its southern terminus is at FM 499 in eastern Greenville. It runs north and intersects FM 1566 before reaching its northern terminus at FM 512 in the community of South Sulphur, west of Commerce.

FM 118 was designated on January 11, 1945, from US 67 east of Greenville at Ardis Heights north 2.5 miles (4.0 km) to SH 24 (now SH 224) northeast of Greenville. On June 25, 1945, the road was extended to Jacobia. On February 21, 1946, the section from SH 24 to US 67 was transferred to SH 355, but this section would again become part of FM 118 on July 1, 1947. On January 16, 1953, FM 118 was extended to FM 512, replacing FM 1738, and a spur connection in Jacobia was added.

== FM 119 ==
Farm to Market Road 119
- Location: Sherman and Moore counties
- Length: 45.937 mi (73.928 km)
- Existed: December 12, 1944–present

Farm to Market Road 119 (FM 119) is located in Sherman and Moore counties. It runs from US 54 southwestward of Texhoma south to US 287 4 miles (6.4 km) north of Dumas.

FM 119 was designated on December 12, 1944, from US 287 4 miles (6.4 km) north of Dumas to Sunray. On July 11, 1945, the road was extended north from Sunray 2.5 miles (4.0 km). On February 11, 1946, it was extended 6.0 miles (9.7 km) north of the Moore–Sherman county line. On September 17, 1952, the road was extended north to Texhoma, replacing FM 845 and FM 1269 and creating concurrencies at FM 289 (now SH 15) and FM 1573. On May 6, 1964, the section of FM 119 from the Oklahoma state line south to FM 289 was transferred to FM 1290; FM 119 was extended north on a new route from FM 289 to US 54; however, signage was not changed until January 1, 1965.

== FM 120 ==
Farm to Market Road 120
- Location: Grayson County
- Length: 20.330 mi (32.718 km)
- Existed: January 11, 1945–present

Farm to Market Road 120 (FM 120) is located in Grayson County. It runs from Cooks Corner Road and Willow Springs Road west of Pottsboro to the Carpenter's Bluff bridge.

FM 120 was designated on January 11, 1945, from Carpenter's Bluff to Denison and then on to Pottsboro. On July 14, 1949, the road was extended north to Fink. On December 17, 1952, the road was extended north to the Government Property Line. On May 10, 1957, the road was extended west from old US 75 to SH 75A (now SH 91), eliminating a concurrency. On July 28, 1959, the road was extended east along old FM 84 to SH 75A. On February 25, 1968, the road was rerouted in Denison. On June 27, 1995, the section from FM 1417 to FM 1753 was transferred to Urban Road 120 (UR 120). On December 17, 2009, the section from Elks Boulevard and Preston Bend junction north of Preston south 6.3 miles (10.1 km) was transferred to SH 289, the section from Worthington Lane in Pottsboro south 0.7 miles (1.1 km) to existing FM 120 was transferred to Spur 316, and FM 120 was extended west 4.5 miles (7.2 km) to Cooks Corner Road/Willow Springs Road, replacing a section of FM 996. The designation of the section previously transferred to UR 120 reverted to FM 120 with the elimination of the Urban Road system on November 15, 2018.

== FM 121 ==
Farm to Market Road 121
- Location: Grayson County
- Length: 33.088 mi (53.250 km)
- Existed: January 11, 1945–present

Farm to Market Road 121 (FM 121) is located in Grayson County. It runs from US 377 in Tioga to SH 160 south of Whitewright. There is a concurrency with SH 5 in Van Alstyne.

Because of possible confusion between FM 121 and SH 121 (the main road to DFW Airport) approximately 15 miles (24 km) to the south, southbound US 75 in Van Alstyne has a sign saying "DFW Traffic Use Exit 38C" at the exit for FM 121.

FM 121 was designated on January 11, 1945, from Van Alstyne to Gunter. On November 23, 1948, the road was extended east to Cannon. On May 23, 1951, the road was extended east to SH 160 south of Whitewright. On January 16, 1953, the road was extended west to SH 10 (now US 377) at Tioga, replacing FM 1284 (connecting section designated December 17, 1952). On December 15, 1977, a break in the route was added at SH 5. On February 27, 2020, FM Spur 121 was designated along a portion of the proposed Dallas North Tollway extension from FM 121 4 miles (6.4 km) west of SH 289 to the tripoint of Grayson, Collin, and Denton counties.

Junction list

The entire route is in Grayson County.

Location	mi	km	Destinations	Notes
Tioga			US 377 – Pilot Point, Whitesboro	
Gunter			SH 289 (Preston Road) – Southmayd, Celina	
			FM 3356 south – Weston	
Van Alstyne			US 75 (Collins Freeway) – Sherman, McKinney	US 75 exit 51
Van Alstyne			SH 5 north – Howe	West end of SH 5 overlap
Van Alstyne			SH 5 south – Anna	East end of SH 5 overlap
			FM 2729 north – Tom Bean	
			SH 160 – Whitewright, Desert	
1.000 mi = 1.609 km; 1.000 km = 0.621 mi

== FM 122 ==
Farm to Market Road 122
- Location: Crosby County
- Length: 0.130 mi (209 m)
- Existed: February 28, 1945–present

Farm to Market Road 122 (FM 122) is located in Crosby County. It runs from SH 207 to Avenue G in Ralls.

FM 122 was designated on February 28, 1945, from US 82 at Ralls south to Caprock as a replacement of a section of SH 207. On June 11, 1945, a section from Post north 8.0 miles (12.9 km) was added, creating a gap. On December 16, 1948, the northern section was extended south to 1.5 miles (2.4 km) north of the end of the southern section. On February 25, 1949, the sections were connected. On July 31, 1956, the road was extended north to the new location of US 62. On October 31, 1958, a spur was added in Ralls. On September 1, 1965, the entirety of mainline FM 122 was transferred back to SH 207, and the FM 122 designation was applied to the remaining spur route.

While TxDOT lists the 0.175-mile-long (0.282 km) FM 742 as the shortest route of the Farm to Market system, FM 122's certified mileage of 0.13 miles (0.21 km) is less.

== FM 123 ==
Farm to Market Road 123
- Location: Panola County
- Length: 10.712 mi (17.239 km)
- Existed: January 11, 1945–present

Farm to Market Road 123 (FM 123) is located in Panola County. It runs from US 79 northeast of Carthage to the Louisiana state line.

FM 123 was designated on January 11, 1945, from US 79 east and southeast 10.2 miles (16.4 km) to Deadwood. On January 30, 1951, the road was extended southeast 10.2 miles (16.4 km) to the Louisiana state line. On January 7, 1952, the section from east of US 70 southeast to Louisiana became part of FM 31, and FM 123 was rerouted directly east to the Louisiana state line, replacing FM 998.

== FM 124 ==
Farm to Market Road 124
- Location: Panola County
- Length: 15.154 mi (24.388 km)
- Existed: January 11, 1945–present

Farm to Market Road 124 (FM 124) is located in Panola County. It runs from US 79 west of Carthage to US 59.

FM 124 was designated on January 11, 1945, from US 79 northeast to SH 149 in Beckville. On October 29, 1953, the road was extended east to FM 959. On September 27, 1960, the road was extended east to US 59, creating a concurrency with FM 959. However, FM 959 was realigned on a new straight route, eliminating the concurrency with FM 959.

== FM 125 ==
Farm to Market Road 125
- Location: Cass County
- Length: 24.667 mi (39.698 km)
- Existed: February 28, 1945–present

Farm to Market 125 (FM 125) is located in Cass County. It runs from SH 8 north of Linden southeast to the Louisiana state line with a spur connection to US 59 and SH 155 in Linden.

FM 125 was designated on February 28, 1945, from Linden to Kildare, then onward to SH 43, 2.0 miles (3.2 km) miles north of the Cass–Marion county line. On April 14, 1947, the road was extended via McLeod to the Louisiana state line. On June 2, 1964, the road was extended north 2.0 miles (3.2 km) miles over old SH 8; the old route became FM Spur 125.

== FM 126 ==
Farm to Market Road 126
- Location: Jones, Taylor, and Nolan counties
- Length: 59.808 mi (96.252 km)
- Existed: January 11, 1945–present

Farm to Market Road 126 (FM 126) is located in Jones, Taylor and Nolan counties. The highway begins at SH 153 near Nolan. It heads northwest towards Merkel in Taylor County and ends at US Highway 83 near Hamlin in Jones County.

FM 126 was designated on January 11, 1945, from US 80 (later Loop 39, now Business I-20-P) northward 10.9 miles (17.5 km) to Noodle. On December 16, 1948, the road was extended southwest 10.4 miles (16.7 km) via Blair to Nubia, replacing FM 615. On November 20, 1951, the road was extended southwest to the Nolan County line. On December 13, 1951, the road was extended southwest to FM 53 (now SH 153), replacing FM 607. On December 17, 1952, the road was extended north to US 180. On October 22, 1954, the road was extended north to US 83, replacing FM 606.

== FM 127 ==
Farm to Market Road 127
- Location: Titus County
- Length: 10.374 mi (16.695 km)
- Existed: February 28, 1945–present

Farm to Market Road 127 (FM 127) is located in Titus County. The highway begins at Farm to Market Road 21 (FM 21) in Blodgett in Titus County. It heads northeast and ends at US 271 in Mt. Pleasant.

FM 127 was designated on February 28, 1945, from Spur 134 (later this section became part of rerouted US 271, now SH 49) in Mount Pleasant southwestward 8.2 miles (13.2 km) to a community. On December 17, 1952, the road was extended southwest 2.2 miles (3.5 km) to FM 21. On March 29, 2018, the section from SH 49 to US 271 was cancelled.

== FM 128 ==
Farm to Market Road 128
- Location: Delta County
- Length: 16.259 mi (26.166 km)
- Existed: February 28, 1945–present

Farm to Market Road 128 (FM 128) is located in Delta County. The highway begins at Farm to Market 64 (FM 64) near Pecan Gap. It heads east through Ben Franklin and ends at State Highway 24 (SH 24) near Cooper.

FM 128 was designated on February 28, 1945, from SH 24 near Cooper northwest via Ben Franklin to FM 64 in Pecan Gap. On November 23, 1948, the road was extended west to Ladonia, but on February 16, 1949, this extension became part of FM 64 instead.

== FM 129 ==
Farm to Market Road 129
- Location: Palo Pinto County
- Length: 10.182 mi (16.386 km)
- Existed: February 28, 1945–present

Farm to Market Road 129 (FM 129) is located in Palo Pinto County. The highway begins at FM 4 near Santo. It heads east through Brazos and ends at US 281.

FM 129 was designated on February 28, 1945, from US 281 north 3.0 miles (4.8 km) to Brazos. On November 24, 1959, the road was extended southwest 3.5 miles (5.6 km) to FM 2265. On December 15, 1959, the road was extended southwest to FM 4, replacing FM 2265.

== FM 130 ==
Farm to Market Road 130
- Location: Morris County, Cass County
- Length: 21.368 mi (34.388 km)
- Existed: May 23, 1951–present

Farm to Market Road 130 (FM 130) is located in Morris and Cass counties. The highway begins at US 259 in Daingerfield. It heads east and ends at SH 11 near Linden.

FM 130 was designated on May 23, 1951, from SH 11 northwest to Carterville. On October 31, 1957, the road was extended west to FM 250. On September 21, 1973, the road was extended west to US 259, replacing FM 2891 and part of FM 1400.

=== FM 130 (1945) ===
Farm to Market Road 130
- Location: Palo Pinto County
- Existed: February 28, 1945–September 26, 1945

A previous route numbered FM 130 was designated on February 28, 1945, from US 180 at Palo Pinto south to Lone Camp. FM 130 was cancelled on September 26, 1945, and became a portion of FM 4.

== FM 131 ==
Farm to Market Road 131
- Location: Grayson County
- Length: 7.333 mi (Note: The certified length given is shorter than the actual mileage, as the Texas Department of Transportation description of FM 131 considers it to be discontinuous at rather than concurrent with FM 691.) (11.801 km)
- Existed: February 28, 1945–present

Farm to Market Road 131 (FM 131) is located in Grayson County.

FM 131 begins at a junction with US 75 in Sherman. The highway travels in a northern direction along Travis Street, crosses US 82, then leaves the city near Knollwood. FM 131 has an overlap with FM 691 in an unincorporated area of the county, then travels through the westernmost part of Denison, ending at an intersection with FM 120.

FM 131 was designated on February 28, 1945, from US 75 at Sherman to Pottsboro. On December 5, 1958, the section from FM 691 to Pottsboro was transferred to FM 1417 and FM 996, although this section remained signed as FM 131 until the 1960 travel map was released. On November 24, 1959, the road was extended north to FM 120. On June 27, 1995, the entire route was transferred to Urban Road 131 (UR 131). The designation reverted to FM 131 with the elimination of the Urban Road system on November 15, 2018.

Junction list

The entire route is in Grayson County.

Location	mi	km	Destinations	Notes
Sherman	0.0	0.0	US 75 (Sam Rayburn Freeway)	US 75 exit 60
Sherman	1.7	2.7	US 82 (Buck Owens Freeway) – Gainesville, Bonham	US 82 exit 641 (east) / exit 642A (west)
	3.9	6.3	FM 691 west – Grayson County College, Airport	South end of FM 691 overlap
	5.1	8.2	FM 691 east	North end of FM 691 overlap; access to Texoma Medical Center
Denison	8.5	13.7	FM 120 – Pottsboro, Denison	
1.000 mi = 1.609 km; 1.000 km = 0.621 mi: Concurrency terminus

== FM 132 ==
Farm to Market Road 132
- Location: Houston County
- Length: 7.180 mi (11.555 km)
- Existed: 1945–present

Farm to Market Road 132 (FM 132) is located in Houston County. It runs from CR 3120 east to SH 7 at Crockett.

FM 132 was designated on February 28, 1945, from SH 7 southwest 2.5 miles (4.0 km) miles to Porter Springs. On October 31, 1957, the road was extended southwest 2.3 miles (3.7 km). On May 2, 1962, the road was extended southwest 2.5 miles (4.0 km) to its current end.

== FM 133 ==
Farm to Market Road 133
- Location: Dimmit and La Salle counties
- Length: 20.632 mi (33.204 km)
- Existed: January 11, 1945–present

Farm to Market Road 133 (FM 133) is located in Dimmit and La Salle counties. It runs from US 83 at Catarina to I-35 at Artesia Wells.

FM 133 was designated on January 11, 1945, from US 83 at or near Catarina to US 81 (present-day I-35) at or near Artesia Wells and then to Freer. This segment was part of SH 189 and SH 55 before 1939. On September 9, 1947, the route was modified to have a concurrency with US 81 from Artesia Wells to a point midway between Artesia Wells and Encinal; this concurrency was extended to Encinal on January 27, 1948. On October 28, 1953, the 46-mile (74 km) section of FM 133 east of US 81 was transferred to FM 863 (now SH 44).

== FM 134 ==
Farm to Market Road 134
- Location: Marion and Harrison counties
- Length: 28.739 mi (46.251 km)
- Existed: January 10, 1945–present

Farm to Market Road 134 (FM 134) is located in Marion and Harrison counties. It runs from I-20 and US 80 near Waskom northwest to SH 49 in Jefferson.

FM 134 was designated on January 10, 1945, from US 59 near Jefferson to SH 43 near Karnack. On June 11, 1945, the road was extended southeast to Leigh, creating a concurrency with SH 43. On July 15, 1949, the road was extended south to US 80, while a short section of the old route in Leigh was redesignated as a spur connection. On August 30, 1950, the concurrency with SH 43 was removed as SH 43's southern section was truncated. On February 19, 1953, the spur connection to Leigh became part of FM 1999. On May 25, 1955, the road was extended northwest along the old route of US 59 to SH 49 in Jefferson. On August 13, 1962, the road was relocated in Karnack, creating a concurrency with FM 1915, which became part of SH 43 on June 1, 1967.

== FM 135 ==
Farm to Market Road 135
- Location: San Jacinto County
- Length: 7.304 mi (11.755 km)
- Existed: May 29, 1985–present

Farm to Market Road 135 (FM 135) is located in San Jacinto County. The road was designated on May 29, 1985, from FM 980 to near the Livingston Reservoir as a replacement for FM Spur 980 to avoid confusion with the other FM Spur 980.

=== FM 135 (1944) ===
Farm to Market Road 135
- Location: Floyd County
- Length: 7.304 mi (11.755 km)
- Existed: May 18, 1944–March 24, 1958

A previous route numbered FM 135 was designated on May 18, 1944, from Lockney east to SH 207. On December 3, 1951, the road was extended to Loop 75, replacing Spur 75. FM 135 was cancelled on March 24, 1958, and transferred to FM 97, but signage was not changed until 1959.

== FM 136 ==
Farm to Market Road 136
- Location: Refugio, Aransas, San Patricio counties
- Length: 29.490 mi (47.460 km)
- Existed: February 28, 1945–present

Farm to Market Road 136 (FM 136) is located in Refugio, Aransas, and San Patricio counties. It runs from US 77 in Woodsboro to SH 35 northeast of Gregory.

FM 136 was designated on February 28, 1945, to go from US 77 in Woodsboro via Bayside to US 181 in Gregory. On September 24, 1952, the road was extended southeast 0.7 miles (1.1 km) along the old route of US 181 to SH 35/US 181. On July 30, 1976, FM 136 was rerouted over old FM 3284 to end at SH 35 northeast of Gregory, while the old route of FM 136 was redesignated as new FM 3284.

== FM 137 ==
Farm to Market Road 137
- Location: Lamar County
- Length: 24.718 mi (39.780 km)
- Existed: February 26, 1945–present

Farm to Market Road 137 (FM 137) is located in Lamar County. It runs from US 82 Business in Paris to FM 38 in Roxton, and from another point on FM 38 to US 82 in Petty.

FM 137 was designated on February 28, 1945, to go from SH 24 8.0 miles (12.9 km) south of Paris to FM 38 in Roxton. On April 30, 1945, the road was extended to Noble, replacing a portion of FM 38. On August 18, 1945, the road was corrected so that it ended at SH 24 5.0 miles (8.0 km) south of Paris. On August 1, 1946, the section from Atlas to SH 24 was cancelled, and the road was rerouted to end at US 82 (now Bus. US 82) in Paris. On August 25, 1949, the road was extended from Noble to US 82 in Petty.

== FM 138 ==
Farm to Market Road 138
- Location: Shelby and Nacogdoches counties
- Length: 21.620 mi (34.794 km)
- Existed: February 28, 1945–present

Farm to Market Road 138 (FM 138) is located in Shelby and Nacogdoches counties. It runs from US 96 in Center to US 59 in Garrison.

FM 138 was designated on February 28, 1945, to go from US 96 westward 5.0 miles (8.0 km) in the direction of Stockman. On November 23, 1948, the road was extended to FM 415 in Stockman. On October 31, 1958, the road was extended west 3.6 miles (5.8 km) to the Attoyac River. On November 28, 1958, the road was extended to US 59, replacing FM 2023.

== FM 139 ==
Farm to Market Road 139
- Location: Shelby County
- Length: 29.971 mi (48.234 km)
- Existed: February 28, 1945–present

Farm to Market Road 139 (FM 139) is located in Shelby County. It runs from SH 7 to SH 87, and from another point on SH 87 to Liberty School.

FM 139 was designated on February 28, 1945, to go from SH 7 southeastward 4.3 miles (6.9 km) to the Sabine National Forest boundary. On May 23, 1951, the road was extended to 3.2 miles (5.1 km) to a road intersection at Ashton School. On December 17, 1952, the road was extended 6.0 miles (9.7 km) to Pauls Store. On November 13, 1953, the road was extended to SH 87, replacing FM 1278 (connecting section designated October 28). On June 28, 1963, the road was extended to Liberty School.

== FM 140 ==
Farm to Market Road 140
- Location: Uvalde, Zavala, Frio, and Atascosa counties
- Length: 97.788 mi (157.375 km)
- Existed: February 28, 1945–present

Farm to Market Road 140 (FM 140) is located in Uvalde, Zavala, Frio, and Atascosa counties. It runs from FM 117 near Uvalde to Business I-35 in Pearsall, and from another point on Business I-35 to US 281 north of Campbellton.

FM 140 was designated on February 28, 1945, to go from US 81 (now Business I-35) in Pearsall eastward 11.0 miles (17.7 km) to the road intersection just eastward of San Miguel Creek. On July 9, 1945, another section from the Zavala–Frio county line to SH 85 at Charlotte was added. On December 16, 1948, the road was extended from the road intersection just eastward of San Miguel Creek to the Zavala–Frio county line, connecting the sections, and the road was extended southeast 3.8 miles (6.1 km) from Charlotte to a road intersection. On October 26, 1949, the road was extended southeast 2.9 miles (4.7 km) to 6.7 miles (10.8 km) southeast of Charlotte. On January 29, 1953, the road was extended southeast to Christine and extended west to Frio Town community, replacing FM 477 and FM 1465 (connecting section from east end to west end of FM 477 designated on December 17, 1952). On July 28, 1953, the road was relocated southeast of Charlotte. On March 24, 1954, the road was extended west 22.6 miles (36.4 km) to the end of FM 188. On May 26, 1954, the road was extended west to FM 117, replacing FM 188. On June 21, 1955, the road was extended east to US 281.

== FM 141 ==
Farm to Market Road 141
- Location: Lee County
- Length: 20.119 mi (32.378 km)
- Existed: January 11, 1945–present

Farm to Market Road 141 (FM 141) is located in Lee County. It runs from SH 21 via Dime Box to US 290 in Giddings.

FM 141 was designated on January 11, 1945, from SH 21 near Old Dime Box to Dime Box and then on to a road intersection 2.1 miles (3.4 km) southeast of Dime Box. On October 28, 1953, the road was extended southwest to US 290 in Giddings, replacing FM 1985.

== FM 142 ==
Farm to Market Road 142
- Location: Jones and Shackelford counties
- Length: 9.2 mi (14.8 km)
- Existed: February 28, 1945–present

Farm to Market Road 142 (FM 142) is located in Jones and Shackelford counties. It runs from SH 6 at Stamford eastward and southward to SH 6 near Lueders.

FM 142 was designated on February 28, 1945, from US 380 (now SH 6) at Stamford eastward and southward 13.0 miles (20.9 km) to Bethel Lutheran Church. On October 31, 1958, the road was extended south and west to US 380 (now SH 6) at Avoca. On December 3, 1962, the section from FM 600 to Avoca became part of rerouted FM 600, and FM 142 was rerouted over the old route of FM 600 to US 380 (now SH 6) near Lueders.

== FM 143 ==
Farm to Market Road 143
- Location: Bexar County
- Length: 0.805 mi (1,296 m)
- Existed: July 28, 1994–present

Farm to Market Road 143 (FM 143) is located in Bexar County. It runs from Cagnon Road near the Texas Department of Criminal Justice's Dominguez Unit southwest of San Antonio to Loop 1604.

The current FM 143 was designated on July 28, 1994. The Dominguez Unit opened in May 1995.

=== FM 143 (1945) ===
Farm to Market Road 143
- Location: King and Knox counties
- Existed: February 28, 1945–August 29, 1990

A previous route numbered FM 143 was designated on February 28, 1945, from SH 283 (now SH 6) at Knox City westward to the eastern side of the Brazos River. On September 9, 1947, the road was shortened 1.5 miles (2.4 km), shortening the length to 4.9 miles (7.9 km). On November 20, 1951, FM 143 was extended west 3.0 miles (4.8 km). It was extended west and northwest to the King County line on October 26, 1954. FM 143 was extended northwest to US 82 later that day. On September 5, 1973, FM 143 was signed (but not designated) as part of SH 222. On July 31, 1975, FM 143 was rerouted in Knox City. FM 143 was cancelled on August 29, 1990, as the SH 222 designation became official.

== FM 144 ==
Farm to Market Road 144
- Location: Morris County
- Length: 24.965 mi (40.177 km)
- Existed: February 28, 1945–present

Farm to Market Road 144 (FM 144) is located in Morris County. It runs from US 259 to US 67 in Omaha, and from another point on US 67 in Omaha to SH 49, and from another point on SH 49 to FM 997 at Jenkins.

FM 144 was designated on February 28, 1945, from SH 11 at or near Cason northward to SH 49 near the Morris–Titus county line. On June 11, 1945, the road was extended north to SH 26 (later US 259; now Spur 284) at Omaha. On December 17, 1952, the road was extended south 4.0 miles (6.4 km) to a road intersection near Boggy Creek. On October 13, 1954, the road was extended east to FM 997 at Jenkins. On May 31, 1965, the road was extended north along the old location of US 259 to US 67. On September 26, 1967, the road was extended further north along the old location of US 259.

== FM 145 ==
Farm to Market Road 145
- Location: Parmer, Castro, Swisher, and Briscoe counties
- Length: 107.108 mi (172.374 km)
- Existed: February 28, 1945–present

Farm to Market Road 145 (FM 145) is located in Parmer, Castro, Swisher, and Briscoe counties. It runs from US 84 southeastward of Farwell east to FM 378, and from another point on FM 378 to SH 86.

FM 145 was designated on February 28, 1945, from US 87 in Kress east 5.0 miles (8.0 km) to a road intersection. On June 11, 1945, the road was extended west 5.0 miles (8.0 km). On December 16, 1948, the road was extended west 4.0 miles (6.4 km) to a county road (now FM 1424) and east 4.0 miles (6.4 km) to another road intersection. On July 14, 1949, the road was extended west 2.0 miles (3.2 km) to a road intersection and east 2.0 miles (3.2 km) to a road intersection. On November 20, 1951, the road was extended east 3.0 miles (4.8 km) to a road intersection. On October 15, 1955, the road was extended west to SH 51 (now US 385), replacing FM 1175, and extended east to FM 598, replacing FM 409. On November 21, 1957, FM 145 was extended west to US 84, replacing FM 690, though the section west of FM 299 (signed as part of SH 214, which the road was officially designated as in 1966) was signed as FM 690 until 1958. On September 27, 1960, the road was extended east to FM 2464 and replaced a section of it to SH 86.

== FM 146 ==
Farm to Market Road 146
- Location: Swisher and Briscoe counties
- Length: 25.957 mi (41.774 km)
- Existed: February 28, 1945–present

Farm to Market Road 146 (FM 146) is located in Swisher and Briscoe counties. It runs from SH 86 in Tulia north and east to SH 207.

FM 146 was designated on February 28, 1945, from Tulia north 5.0 miles (8.0 km) to a road intersection. On November 28, 1945, the road's description was amended so that it went from SH 86 in Tulia north 6.0 miles (9.7 km) to a road intersection. On December 17, 1947, the road was extended north and east 18.0 miles (29.0 km) to the Swisher–Briscoe county line. On September 29, 1948, the road was extended east 2.1 miles (3.4 km) to San Jacinto School. On December 16, 1948, the road was extended south 3.8 miles (6.1 km) to a road intersection. On August 6, 1951, the road was routed on Maxwell Street in Tulia, replacing a section of Loop 77. On November 16, 1953, the road was extended south 10.2 miles (16.4 km), replacing FM 1304 (connecting section designated October 28). On October 16, 1957, the section from then-FM 2272 to SH 86 was transferred to FM 284 (now SH 207), along with FM 2272 itself (FM 2272 was reassigned to the old route of FM 284). On September 24, 1963, the section from SH 86 to Sixth Street (then Loop 77) via Maxwell Avenue was given to the city of Tulia, the section from Maxwell Avenue via Sixth Street to FM 1318 became part of FM 1318 (as well as Loop 77 itself), and FM 146 was rerouted over FM Spur 1318 to SH 86.

== FM 147 ==
Farm to Market Road 147
- Location: Limestone and Falls counties
- Length: 22.853 mi (36.778 km)
- Existed: February 28, 1945–present

Farm to Market Road 147 (FM 147) is located in Limestone and Falls counties. It runs SH 14 approximately 4 miles (6.4 km) south of Groesbeck southwest to SH 7 in Marlin.

FM 147 was designated on February 28, 1945, from Marlin northeast to the community of McClanahan. On June 30, 1945, the road was extended to the Limestone County line. On January 18, 1946, the road was extended to Odds in Limestone County. On December 17, 1947, the road was extended northeast to SH 14, replacing FM 340. On February 27, 1958, the road was extended from another point on SH 7 southwest 4.3 miles (6.9 km) to a road intersection. On December 19, 1959, the section southwest of SH 7 was relocated due to inability to secure right of way, and was renumbered FM 712 as a result.

== FM 148 ==
Farm to Market Road 148
- Location: Kaufman County
- Length: 38.253 mi (61.562 km)
- Existed: February 28, 1945–present

Farm to Market Road 148 (FM 148) is located in Kaufman County. It runs from SH 274 near Kemp to US 80 in Terrell.

== FM 149 ==
Farm to Market Road 149
- Location: Montgomery and Grimes counties
- Length: 48.238 mi (77.632 km)
- Existed: April 20, 1945–present

Farm to Market Road 149 (FM 149) is located in Montgomery and Grimes counties. It runs from FM 3090 near Erwin Community east to SH 90 at Anderson. After a short concurrency with SH 90, FM 149 turns east and southeast through Richards and Montgomery to the intersection of FM 1774 and SH 249.

== RM 150 ==
Ranch to Market Road 150
- Location: Hays County
- Length: 25.792 mi (41.508 km)
- Existed: May 31, 1945 (Note: RM 150 was originally designated as FM 150 from 1945 to 1956.)–present

Ranch to Market Road 150 (RM 150) is located in Hays County. It begins at an intersection with RM 12 in Dripping Springs. The highway runs in a generally north–south direction to RM 3237 before turning to the east. RM 150 serves as the Main Street of Kyle, where it meets I-35. RM 150 ends at an intersection with SH 21 just east of Kyle.

RM 150 was designated as Farm to Market Road 150 (FM 150) on May 31, 1945, from Kyle to SH 21. On October 27, 1952, it was extended west to FM 966 in Hays City, replacing Spur 5 and FM 1078. On May 25, 1955, the FM 150 designation was extended to RM 12, replacing FM 966. The designation was changed to RM 150 on October 1, 1956.

Junction list

The entire route is in Hays County.

Location	mi	km	Destinations	Notes
Wimberley	0.0	0.0	RM 12 – Wimberley, Dripping Springs	
	5.2	8.4	FM 1826 north	
	12.1	19.5	RM 3237 west (Old Kyle Road) – Wimberley	
Kyle	18.6	29.9	FM 2770 north (Jack C. Hays Trail)	
Kyle	20.9	33.6	I-35 – Austin, San Antonio	I-35 exit 213
	25.8	41.5	SH 21 – Bastrop, San Marcos	
1.000 mi = 1.609 km; 1.000 km = 0.621 mi

== FM 151 ==
Farm to Market Road 151
- Location: Grayson and Fannin counties
- Length: 7.758 mi (12.485 km)
- Existed: March 26, 1953–present

Farm to Market Road 151 (FM 151) is located in Grayson and Fannin counties. It runs from US 69 in Whitewright southeast to another point on US 69 in Trenton.

FM 151 was designated on March 26, 1953, along the current route. It is a former alignment of US 69 between Whitewright and Trenton.

=== FM 151 (1945) ===
Farm to Market Road 151
- Location: Floyd County
- Existed: June 4, 1945–February 24, 1953

FM 151 was designated on June 4, 1945, from US 70 five miles east of Floydada south 7.0 miles (11.3 km). On November 20, 1951, the road was extended south to the Crosby County line. FM 151 was canceled on February 24, 1953, and transferred to FM 651.

== RM 152 ==
Ranch to Market Road 152
- Location: Mason and Llano counties
- Length: 27.753 mi (44.664 km)
- Existed: June 4, 1945 (Note: RM 152 was originally designated as FM 152 from 1945 to 1959.)–present

Ranch to Market Road 152 (RM 152) is located in Llano County. It runs from SH 16 in Llano southwest to US 87.

RM 152 was designated on June 4, 1945, as Farm to Market Road 152 (FM 152), running from SH 16 in Llano west to Castell as a replacement for a portion of SH 29, which was rerouted. On September 29, 1954, FM 152 was extended southwest to US 87, a spur connection in Castell was designated along the old route, and FM 152 was changed to RM 152. On May 24, 1962, the spur connection to Castell was transferred to RM 2768.

== FM 153 ==
Farm to Market Road 153
- Location: Bastrop and Fayette counties
- Length: 18.931 mi (30.466 km)
- Existed: June 1, 1945–present

Farm to Market Road 153 (FM 153) is located in Bastrop and Fayette counties. It runs from SH 71 north of Smithville east via Winchester to US 77 north of La Grange.

FM 153 was designated on June 1, 1945, from US 77, 7 miles (11 km) north of La Grange, to Winchester. On November 13, 1953 (connecting section designated October 28), the road was extended west to SH 71, replacing FM 1870.

== FM 154 ==
Farm to Market Road 154
- Location: Fayette County
- Length: 17.013 mi (27.380 km)
- Existed: June 1, 1945–present

Farm to Market Road 154 (FM 154) is located in Fayette County. It runs from Loop 543 in West Point south via Muldoon to SH 95.

FM 154 was designated on June 1, 1945, from SH 95, 3 miles (4.8 km) north of Flatonia, to Muldoon. On November 23, 1948, the road was extended 4.0 miles (6.4 km) northeast from Muldoon. On July 22, 1949, the road was extended northeast to SH 71 (now Loop 543) at West Point.

== FM 155 ==
Farm to Market Road 155
- Location: Fayette, Colorado, and Lavaca counties
- Length: 32.498 mi (52.300 km)
- Existed: June 1, 1945–present

Farm to Market Road 155 (FM 155) is located in Fayette, Colorado, and Lavaca counties. It runs from US 77 near La Grange via Holman to US 90 in Weimar, and from US 90 in Weimar to US 90 Alt.

FM 155 was designated on June 1, 1945, from US 77, 1 mile (1.6 km) south of La Grange, south toward Holman to the Fayette–Colorado county line north of Weimar. Twelve days later, the section from Holman via Weimar to 6.4 miles (10.3 km) south of Weimar was added, creating a gap. On January 27, 1949, the road was extended south a further 3.5 miles (5.6 km) from Weimar to SH 200. On November 20, 1951, the section from the Fayette–Colorado county line north of Weimar to Holman was added, closing the gap. On February 1, 1957, the route description was amended to indicate the break in the route at US 90.

== FM 156 ==
Farm to Market Road 156
- Location: Tarrant and Denton counties
- Length: 38.822 mi (62.478 km)
- Existed: June 4, 1945–present

Farm to Market Road 156 (FM 156) is located in Tarrant and Denton counties. It runs from Bus. US 287 in Fort Worth to I-35 in Sanger.

== FM 157 ==
Farm to Market Road 157
- Location: Tarrant, Johnson, and Ellis counties
- Length: 40.099 mi (64.533 km)
- Existed: June 4, 1945–present

Farm to Market Road 157 (FM 157) is located in Tarrant, Johnson, and Ellis counties. It runs from SH 121 in Euless to FM 66 in Maypearl.

== FM 158 ==
Farm to Market Road 158
- Location: Brazos County
- Length: 7.212 mi (11.607 km)
- Existed: June 5, 1945–present

Farm to Market Road 158 (FM 158) runs from FM 1687 and SH 21 eastward to SH 30 in Bryan. It is also known as William J. Bryan Parkway west of SH 6 and Boonville Road east of SH 6.

FM 158 was designated on June 5, 1945, from SH 6 at Bryan through Harvey to the Navasota River. The next day, another section was added from SH 90 north of Roans Prairie west 10 miles (16 km) to the Keith/Carlos Road, creating a gap. On October 26, 1954, FM 158 was extended from the Grimes–Brazos county line to FM 244 at Carlos, closing the gap. On December 15, 1960, the section of FM 158 from FM 60 at Harvey southeast to SH 90 was transferred to SH 30. On July 15, 1988, the section of FM 158 from Loop 507 (former SH 6; now BS 6) east and south to FM 158 was returned to the city of Bryan, and Loop 158 from SH 21 to FM 158 was transferred to FM 158. On June 27, 1995, the entire route was transferred to Urban Road 158 (UR 158). The designation reverted to FM 158 with the elimination of the Urban Road system on November 15, 2018.

== FM 159 ==
Farm to Market Road 159
- Location: Brazos County
- Length: 16.617 mi (26.742 km)
- Existed: June 5, 1945–present

Farm to Market Road 159 (FM 159) is located in Brazos County. It runs from SH 105 near Navasota north to SH 6 near Millican.

FM 159 was designated on June 5, 1945, from SH 90 (now SH 105) to Allen Farm. On July 14, 1949, the road was extended to SH 6.

== FM 160 ==
Farm to Market Road 160
- Location: Liberty County
- Length: 43.688 mi (70.309 km)
- Existed: June 12, 1945–present

Farm to Market Road 160 (FM 160) is located in Liberty County. It runs from FM 770 southwest to Ames and then southeast.

FM 160 was designated on June 12, 1945, from US 90 at Ames southeast 5.0 miles (8.0 km). On May 23, 1951, the road was extended northeast to FM 770.

== FM 161 ==
Farm to Market Road 161
- Location: Morris and Cass counties
- Length: 25.538 mi (41.099 km)
- Existed: May 23, 1951–present

Farm to Market Road 161 (FM 161) is located in Morris and Cass counties. It runs from US 67 in Naples to SH 155.

FM 161 was designated on May 23, 1951, from SH 338 southeast of Naples southeast 7.0 miles (11.3 km) to a road intersection. On October 13, 1954, the road was extended southeast to SH 11 in Hughes Springs, replacing FM 2150. On September 20, 1961, the road was extended south 4.9 miles (7.9 km) to Harris Chapel. On May 2, 1962, the road was extended south to SH 155, its current southern terminus. On April 2, 1964, the road was extended north along the old route of SH 338 to US 67, its current northern terminus.

=== FM 161 (1945) ===
Farm to Market Road 161
- Location: Liberty County
- Existed: June 12, 1945–May 15, 1946

A previous route numbered FM 161 was designated on June 12, 1945, from US 90 6 miles (9.7 km) west of Dayton north to East Gate Road. FM 161's destination was cancelled on May 15, 1946, when FM 686 was substituted for this road.

== FM 162 ==
Farm to Market Road 162
- Location: Hidalgo County
- Length: 1.387 mi (2.232 km)
- Existed: March 31, 1994–present

Farm to Market Road 162 (FM 162) is located in Hidalgo County. It runs from I-69C/US 281 on El Cibolo Road, northeast of Faysville east to a prison site.

=== FM 162 (1945) ===
Farm to Market Road 162
- Location: Liberty and Hardin counties
- Existed: June 12, 1945–December 21, 1984

A previous route numbered FM 162 was designated on June 12, 1945, from Moss Hill east 3.0 miles (4.8 km). On December 17, 1952, the road was extended east to FM 1935 at the Liberty–Hardin county line. On January 29, 1953, the road was extended east to FM 770 at Batson, replacing FM 1935. On September 27, 1960, FM 162 was extended 3.8 miles (6.1 km) northwest from SH 146. On June 26, 1962, FM 162 was extended west another 3.3 miles (5.3 km). On June 28, 1963, FM 162 was extended west to FM 2518. On June 22, 1964, FM 162 was extended to SH 321. FM 162 was cancelled on December 21, 1984, and transferred to SH 105.

== FM 163 ==
Farm to Market Road 163
- Location: Liberty County
- Length: 4.332 mi (6.972 km)
- Existed: June 12, 1945–present

Farm to Market Road 163 (FM 163) is located in Liberty County. It runs from the Oak Shade Fire Tower on SH 321 east and south 4.3 miles (6.9 km).

FM 163 was designated on June 12, 1945, from the Oak Shade Fire Tower on SH 321 to a point 2.3 miles (3.7 km). On November 30, 1949, the road was extended south 2.0 miles (3.2 km). On May 2, 1962, the road was extended to FM 1008, but on August 31, 1964, this extension was cancelled (the proposed extension is now CR 2285).

== FM 164 ==
Farm to Market Road 164
- Location: Childress County
- Length: 6.781 mi (10.913 km)
- Existed: September 5, 1973–present

Farm to Market Road 164 (FM 164) is a designation that has been used three times. The current use is for a loop route in Childress County. It runs from US 287 3 miles (4.8 km) west of Childress south, east, and north 7 miles (11 km) to US 83 in Childress.

FM 164 was designated on September 5, 1973, from US 287 southeast to Childress Army Air Field. On October 9, 1973, the road was extended east to US 83, replacing Spur 184 and a section of FM 2042.

=== FM 164 (1945–1955) ===
Farm to Market Road 164
- Location: Liberty County
- Existed: June 12, 1945–October 3, 1955

The first use of the FM 164 designation was from SH 321 13 miles (21 km) north of Dayton east 2.2 miles (3.5 km) in Liberty County. FM 164 was cancelled on October 3, 1955, and transferred to FM 1008.

=== FM 164 (1956–1967) ===
Farm to Market Road 164
- Location: Hopkins County
- Existed: September 19, 1956–April 27, 1967

The FM 164 designation was next used on a route from US 67 west of Sulphur Springs northeast to SH 19 and Loop 313 in western Sulphur Springs in Hopkins County along a former routing of US 67. Loop 313 replaced another part of the former route of US 67. FM 164 was cancelled on April 27, 1967, and transferred to Loop 313 (now Bus. US 67).

== RM 165 ==
Ranch to Market Road 165
- Location: Blanco and Hays counties
- Length: 15.722 mi (25.302 km)
- Existed: June 11, 1945–present

Ranch to Market Road 165 (RM 165) is located in Blanco and Hays counties.

RM 165 begins at Loop 163 (the former alignment of US 281) in Blanco. The route generally travels east to an intersection with RM 2325 and then to the northeast before ending at a junction with US 290 near Henly.

RM 165 (in conjunction with Loop 163) provides a bypass of Johnson City and the US 281/290 junction for traffic traveling between Blanco and points east of Henly, such as Dripping Springs and Austin.

RM 165 was designated on June 11, 1945 as Farm to Market Road 165 (FM 165), connecting US 281 (and, after its realignment, Loop 163) to Middle Creek Road, approximately 5.4 miles (8.7 km) to the east. The designation was changed to RM 165 on October 1, 1956. The designation was extended to the current eastern terminus of US 290 on November 21, 1956.

The bridge structure crossing the Blanco River (which had replaced the original low-water crossing) was washed out in a catastrophic flooding event on May 23–24, 2015, with road closure at that location until further notice. The bridge deck and support beams were displaced from the piers and washed downstream; the piers and bents may require some repair after inspection for damage, and completion of a replacement deck structure is not anticipated by the Texas Department of Transportation before October 2015.

== FM 166 ==
Farm to Market Road 166
- Location: Burleson County
- Length: 15.545 mi (25.017 km)
- Existed: June 11, 1945–present

Farm to Market Road 166 (FM 166) is located in Burleson County. It runs from SH 36 in Caldwell to FM 50.

FM 166 was designated on June 11, 1945, from SH 36 in Caldwell east 5.0 miles (8.0 km) toward Tunis. On August 26, 1948, the designation was extended east through Tunis to its current terminus at FM 50.

== FM 167 ==
Farm to Market Road 167
- Location: Hood County
- Length: 16.091 mi (25.896 km)
- Existed: May 23, 1951–present

Farm to Market Road 167 (FM 167) is located in Hood County. It runs from FM 51 near the Parker County line east and south to US 377 in Granbury, and then from another point on US 377 south via Acton and DeCordova.

FM 167 was designated on May 23, 1951, from US 377 to the community of Waples. On September 20, 1961, it was extended north to FM 51. On December 20, 1984, it was extended south over part of FM 208 and all of FM 1190 to its current southern terminus at a county road.

=== FM 167 (1945) ===
Farm to Market Road 167
- Location: Johnson, Hill, and Bosque counties
- Existed: June 11, 1945–September 27, 1946

A previous route numbered FM 167 was designated in Johnson County on June 11, 1945, from Cleburne to the Hill County line, as a replacement for SH 353. The same designation also added a segment in Bosque County, from Morgan to Meridian, creating a gap. This gap was closed on August 23, 1945. FM 167 was cancelled on September 27, 1946, and reassigned back to SH 353 (now SH 174).

== FM 168 ==
Farm to Market Road 168
- Location: Terry, Hockley, Lamb, Castro, and Randall counties West Texas
- Length: 139.238 mi (224.082 km)
- Existed: June 11, 1945–present

Farm to Market Road 168 (FM 168) is located in West Texas. It runs from FM 2219 to FM 1076. At 139 miles (224 km), FM 168 is the longest farm to market road in Texas; however RM 33 was 141 miles (227 km) before its truncations in 1977 and 1984.

FM 168 was designated on June 11, 1945, from Hart south to the Lamb County line. The same day the road was extended to Olton. On July 5, 1951, the road was extended north to a point 5.0 miles (8.0 km) from Nazareth, replacing FM 1056 (connecting section designated May 23). On November 20, 1951, FM 168 was extended north and east 8.3 miles (13.4 km) to a road intersection. On July 11, 1952, 3.0 miles (4.8 km) miles of FM 168 were transferred to FM 1075. On September 21, 1955, the road was extended north 4.2 miles (6.8 km) to the Randall County line. On December 14, 1956, the road was extended north to FM 1062, replacing FM 679. On October 24, 1958, the road was extended south to US 84 near Anton, replacing FM 304 (although it remained signed as FM 304 until 1959) and creating a concurrency at US 70. On January 13, 1960, FM 168 was extended south to FM 41, replacing FM 2395 and FM 1632 and creating a concurrency with SH 116 (now SH 114). On September 27, 1960, the road was extended north to FM 2219. On May 5, 1966, the section from FM 41 to US 380 was added. On May 25, 1976, the section from US 380 to FM 1076 was added.

Junction list

County	Location	mi	km	Destinations	Notes
Terry		0.000	0.000	FM 1076 west / County Road 575	
Terry				US 380 east – Tahoka	South end of US 380 overlap
Terry				US 380 west – Brownfield	North end of US 380 overlap
Terry				FM 1698 west	
Terry				FM 211 – Meadow, New Home	
Hockley	Ropesville			FM 41 east – Slide	South end of FM 41 overlap
Hockley	Ropesville			US 62 / US 82 – Brownfield, Lubbock	
Hockley				FM 41 west – Sundown	
Hockley				FM 1585	
Hockley	Smyer			SH 114 east – Lubbock	South end of SH 114 overlap
Hockley	Smyer			SH 114 west – Levelland	North end of SH 114 overlap
Hockley				FM 1294 – Shallowater	
Hockley				FM 597 west	South end of FM 597 overlap
Hockley	Anton			US 84 – Littlefield, Lubbock	
Hockley	Anton			FM 597 east – Abernathy	North end of FM 597 overlap
Lamb	Spade			FM 54 – Littlefield, Petersburg	
Lamb				FM 37 east – Cotton Center	South end of FM 37 overlap
Lamb				FM 37 west – Amherst	North end of FM 37 overlap
Lamb				FM 1071 east	
Lamb	Olton			US 70 east – Plainview	South end of US 70 overlap
Lamb	Olton			US 70 west – Muleshoe	North end of US 70 overlap
Lamb				FM 1842 south	
Lamb				FM 2881 east	
Castro	Hart			FM 145 – Kress	
Castro	Hart			SH 194 – Dimmitt, Plainview	
Castro				FM 928 east	
Castro	Nazareth			SH 86 – Dimmitt, Tulia	
Castro				FM 1075 – Happy	
Randall				FM 1714 east	
Randall	Umbarger			US 60 west – Hereford	South end of US 60 overlap
Randall				US 60 east – Canyon	
Randall				FM 1062 – Canyon	
Randall		139.238	224.082	FM 2219 east / Sampson Road	
1.000 mi = 1.609 km; 1.000 km = 0.621 mi: Concurrency terminus

== RM 169 ==
Ranch to Market Road 169
- Location: Presidio County
- Length: 25.028 mi (40.279 km)
- Existed: June 11, 1945 (Note: RM 169 was originally designated as FM 169 from 1945 to 1967.)–present

Ranch to Market Road 169 (RM 169) is located in Presidio County.

The southern terminus of RM 169 is at Casa Piedra Road near Plata. The route travels north near Alamito Creek and reaches its northern terminus at US 67 approximately 7 miles (11 km) south of Marfa.

The route was established on June 11, 1945, as Farm to Market Road 169 (FM 169), a 13.0-mile (20.9 km) road from US 67 towards Casa Piedra. FM 169 was extended 13.4 miles (21.6 km) southward on July 15, 1949, and redesignated RM 169 on June 29, 1967.

== FM 170 ==
Farm to Market Road 170
- Location: Brewster and Presidio counties
- Length: 114.580 mi (184.399 km)
- Existed: June 11, 1945 (Note: FM 170 was designated as RM 170 from 1958 to by 1981.)–present

== FM 171 ==
Farm to Market Road 171
- Location: Wichita and Clay counties
- Length: 37.212 mi (59.887 km)
- Existed: June 11, 1945–present

Farm to Market Road 171 (FM 171) is located in Wichita and Clay counties. It runs from Bus. US 287 in Wichita Falls to FM 2332.

== FM 172 ==
Farm to Market Road 172
- Location: Archer and Clay counties
- Length: 23.145 mi (37.248 km)
- Existed: June 11, 1945–present

Farm to Market Road 172 (FM 172) connects the farming areas of eastern Archer County and southern Clay County. It passes just south of and crosses a portion of Lake Arrowhead in Clay County. FM 172 terminates at SH 25 near Windthorst and at SH 148 near Bluegrove, between Henrietta and Jacksboro.

FM 172 was designated on June 11, 1945, from SH 148 west to Bluegrove. On May 23, 1951, it was extended west to Deer Creek. On November 20, 1951, the route from Bluegrove to Deer Creek was renumbered FM 1883. Instead, FM 172 was rerouted west to US 281 at Scotland, replacing FM 1783. On January 23, 1953, it was extended westward and southward 4.6 miles (7.4 km) to a road intersection. On October 28, 1953, it was extended to SH 25.

== FM 173 ==
Farm to Market Road 173
- Location: Clay County
- Length: 0.944 mi (1,519 m)
- Existed: June 11, 1945–present

Farm to Market Road 173 (FM 173) is located in Clay County. Its western terminus is in the unincorporated community of Joy, at an intersection with Old Joy–Shannon Road. It travels approximately 0.9 miles (1.4 km) to the east before ending at SH 148.

FM 173 was designated on June 11, 1945, along the current route.

== FM 174 ==
Farm to Market Road 174
- Location: Archer, Clay, and Montague counties
- Length: 35.492 mi (57.119 km)
- Existed: June 11, 1945–present

Farm to Market Road 174 (FM 174) is located in Archer, Clay, and Montague counties. It runs from US 281 and SH 25 in Windthorst to US 81 in Bowie.

FM 174 was designated on June 11, 1945, from SH 148 east to Buffalo Springs. On May 26, 1949, it was extended east to the end of FM 176 at Vashti and replaced that route from Vashti to Bellevue. On February 6, 1953, the portion from Vashti to Bellevue was transferred to FM 1288, while FM 174 was instead extended east over old FM 1288 from Vashti to US 287 in Bowie. On September 29, 1954, it was extended west from SH 148 to US 281. On April 2, 1980, it was extended east along a former segment of US 287 to its current terminus at US 81 in Bowie.

== FM 175 ==
Farm to Market Road 175
- Location: Jack and Clay counties
- Length: 11.337 mi (18.245 km)
- Existed: June 11, 1945–present

Farm to Market Road 175 (FM 175) is located in Jack and Clay counties. Its western terminus is in northwestern Jack County at Loop 187, the former alignment of US 281 through Antelope. The two-lane road travels to the east, then the north, and again to the east before entering Clay County. It passes through the community of Shannon before reaching its eastern terminus at SH 148.

FM 175 was designated from SH 148 to Shannon on June 11, 1945. The designation was extended to the Clay–Jack county line on October 29, 1954. On November 18, 1954, it was extended to US 281 (now Loop 187) in Antelope, replacing FM 2063.

== FM 176 ==
Farm to Market Road 176
- Location: Concho County
- Length: 5.631 mi (9.062 km)
- Existed: May 23, 1951–present

Farm to Market Road 176 (FM 176) is located in western Concho County, beginning at an intersection with County Road 2332 (CR 2332) and CR 2335. The 5.7-mile (9.2 km) road continues north to terminate at an intersection with US 87 just west of Eden.

The entire highway has a speed limit of 70 miles per hour (110 km/h), which is lowered to 65 miles per hour (105 km/h) at night.

FM 176 was designated on May 23, 1951, along the current route.

=== FM 176 (1945) ===
Farm to Market Road 176
- Location: Clay County
- Existed: June 11, 1945–May 26, 1949

A previous route numbered FM 176 was designated on June 11, 1945, from Bellevue to Vashti. FM 176 was cancelled on May 26, 1949, and became a portion of FM 174.

== FM 177 ==
Farm to Market Road 177
- Location: Cherokee County
- Length: 4.983 mi (8.019 km)
- Existed: May 23, 1951–present

Farm to Market Road 177 (FM 177) is located in Cherokee County.

The western terminus of FM 177 is at US 69. It has intersections with FM 2493 west of Mixon and FM 3052 in Mixon before reaching its eastern terminus at SH 135.

The current FM 177 was designated on May 23, 1951, along the current route.

=== FM 177 (1945) ===
Farm to Market Road 177
- Location: Dawson County
- Existed: June 11, 1945–April 30, 1947

The first FM 177 was designated in Dawson County on June 11, 1945, from SH 137, 3 miles (4.8 km) south of Lamesa, to Patricia. FM 177 was cancelled on April 30, 1947, and became a portion of SH 349.

== FM 178 ==
Farm to Market Road 178
- Location: Dawson County
- Length: 25.004 mi (40.240 km)
- Existed: June 11, 1945–present

Farm to Market Road 178 (FM 178) is located in Dawson County. It runs from US 87 northward through Midway and Key to FM 1210 at US 87.

FM 178 was designated on June 11, 1945, from US 180 in Key southward 3.0 miles (4.8 km) to Midway. On September 29, 1948, the road was extended southward 4.0 miles (6.4 km) to a road intersection. On September 21, 1955, the road was extended south to US 87. On May 5, 1966, the road was extended northward 1.9 miles (3.1 km) to FM 827, replaced a section of FM 827, and extended north from FM 827 to FM 1210 at US 87.

== FM 179 ==
Farm to Market Road 179
- Location: Dawson, Lynn, Lubbock, and Hale counties
- Length: 106.931 mi (172.089 km)
- Existed: June 11, 1945–present

Farm to Market Road 179 (FM 179) is located in Dawson, Lynn, Lubbock, and Hale counties. It runs from US 87 in Lamesa to SH 194 near Edmonson.

== FM 180 ==
Farm to Market Road 180
- Location: Lee County
- Length: 13.131 mi (21.132 km)
- Existed: May 5, 1966–present

Farm to Market Road 180 (FM 180) is located in Lee County. It runs from US 290 to the Nails Creek State Park entrance.

FM 180 was designated on May 5, 1966, from US 290, 1.6 miles (2.6 km) west of the Fayette County line, northeast 5.8 miles (9.3 km). On May 7, 1970, the road was extended to FM 1697. On November 3, 1972, the road was extended to the Nails Creek State Park entrance.

=== FM 180 (1945) ===
Farm to Market Road 180
- Location: Dawson County
- Existed: June 11, 1945–April 8, 1964

A previous route numbered FM 180 was designated on June 11, 1945, from Arvana, north of Lamesa, to 3.0 miles (4.8 km) east. FM 180 was cancelled on April 8, 1964, and renumbered FM 2411 to eliminate confusion with US 180.

== FM 181 ==
Farm to Market Road 181
- Location: Gaines, Andrews, and Ector counties
- Length: 63.301 mi (101.873 km)
- Existed: June 11, 1945 (Note: FM 181 was designated as RM 181 from 1964 to 1992.)–present

Farm to Market Road 181 (FM 181) is located in Gaines, Andrews, and Ector counties.

FM 181 was designated on June 11, 1945, from SH 51 (now US 385) in Seminole southwest to the Gaines–Andrews county line. On July 14, 1949, the road was extended southeast 7.4 miles (11.9 km). On July 25, 1951, the road was extended to FM 87 (now SH 176). On August 16, 1951, the road was extended to FM 703 (now SH 115), replacing FM 1303. On December 17, 1951, the road was extended to the Andrews–Ector county line. On December 17, 1952, the road was extended to SH 302.

In 1964 or later, the designation was changed to Ranch to Market Road 181 (RM 181), but reverted to FM 181 on June 1, 1992.

== FM 182 ==
Farm to Market Road 182
- Location: Bosque and Coryell counties
- Length: 22.660 mi (36.468 km)
- Existed: June 11, 1945–present

Farm to Market Road 182 (FM 182) is located in Bosque and Coryell counties. It begins at SH 36 1.5 miles (2.4 km) southeast of Ames, passes by Turnersville and Norse, and ends 1.5 miles (2.4 km) north of Norse.

FM 182 was designated on June 11, 1945, from SH 36 to Turnersville. On July 14, 1949, it was extended north to its current northern terminus, replacing FM 928.

== FM 183 ==
Farm to Market Road 183
- Location: Coryell County
- Length: 17.502 mi (28.167 km)
- Existed: June 11, 1945–present

Farm to Market Road 183 (FM 183) is located in Coryell County. The road begins at US 84 and continues southwestward and northwestward, passing through Pearl and Bee House before ending at US 84 east of Evant.

FM 183 was designated on June 11, 1945, from Purmela south across US 84 via Pearl to Bee House. On July 14, 1949, FM 183 was extended north 7.6 miles (12.2 km) to the Coryell–Hamilton county line. On January 14, 1952, the section north of US 84 was transferred to FM 932. On November 21, 1956, the road was extended west 5.0 miles (8.0 km) to FM 2306. On January 15, 1957, the road was extended to US 84 near Evant, replacing FM 2306. When the alignment was constructed, FM 183 was rerouted to bypass Bee House, and the old route to Bee House became a spur connection.

== FM 184 ==
Farm to Market Road 184
- Location: Coryell County
- Length: 6.115 mi (9.841 km)
- Existed: June 11, 1945–present

Farm to Market Road 184 (FM 184) is located in Coryell County. The road begins at SH 36 and continues southeast to the Coryell–Bell county line.

FM 184 was designated on June 11, 1945, from SH 36 southward 4.2 miles (6.8 km) to Seattle. On February 20, 1946, the road was extended northeast to the Bell County line. On May 5, 1964, FM 184 was relocated due to the expansion of the Fort Hood Military Reservation; the old route is now Range Road and Cold Springs Road.

== FM 185 ==
Farm to Market Road 185
- Location: Coryell and McLennan counties
- Length: 30.860 mi (49.664 km)
- Existed: June 11, 1945–present

Farm to Market Road 185 (FM 185) is located in Coryell County. It runs from US 84 northward and eastward via Osage and Crawford to FM 1637.

FM 185 was designated on June 11, 1945, from US 84 to Osage. On July 14, 1949, the road was extended east to Crawford. On October 26, 1954, the road was extended east to SH 6. On September 20, 1961, the road was extended northeast to FM 1637. On July 27, 1995, the section from SH 6 to FM 1637 was redesignated Urban Road 185 (UR 185). The designation reverted to FM 185 with the elimination of the Urban Road system on November 15, 2018.

== FM 186 ==
Farm to Market Road 186
- Location: Dimmit County
- Length: 14.220 mi (22.885 km)
- Existed: June 11, 1945 (Note: FM 186 was designated as RM 186 from 1953 to 1956.)–present

Farm to Market Road 186 (FM 186) is located in Dimmit County. It runs from Loop 225 in Carrizo Springs southwest 14.2 miles (22.9 km) to a county road that continues to Dentonio.

FM 186 was designated on June 11, 1945, from US 83 (this section became Loop 225 on November 18, 1947) in Carrizo Springs southwest 11.2 miles (18.0 km) toward Dentonio. The road was redesignated Ranch to Market Road 186 (RM 186) in 1953, but was changed back to FM 186 on June 1, 1956 due to intersecting Farm to Market Roads being created a few months prior. On November 5, 1971, the road was extended southwest 3.0 miles (4.8 km) to its current terminus.

== RM 187 ==
Ranch to Market Road 187
- Location: Zavala, Uvalde, Bandera, and Kerr counties
- Length: 81.930 mi (131.854 km)
- Existed: June 11, 1945 (Note: RM 187 was originally designated as FM 187 from 1945 to 1963.)–present

Ranch to Market Road 187 (RM 187) is located in Zavala, Uvalde, Bandera, and Kerr counties. It runs from US 57 near Batesville to SH 39.

== FM 188 ==
Farm to Market Road 188
- Location: Galveston County
- Length: 0.424 mi (682 m)
- Existed: October 31, 1958–present

Farm to Market Road 188 (FM 188) is located in Galveston. It runs along Teichman Road, from 89th Street and Blume Drive to I-45 at SH 275.

FM 188 was designated on October 31, 1958, from I-45 at Teichman's Point southwest to the Moody State School. On June 27, 1995, the entire route was transferred to Urban Road 188 (UR 188). The designation reverted to FM 188 with the elimination of the Urban Road system on November 15, 2018.

=== FM 188 (1945) ===
Farm to Market Road 188
- Location: Uvalde County
- Existed: June 11, 1945–May 26, 1954

A previous FM 188 was designated on June 11, 1945, from FM 117, 2 miles (3.2 km) south of Uvalde, southeast 8 miles (13 km) by way of Fort Inge. FM 188 was cancelled on May 26, 1954, and transferred to FM 140.

== RM 189 ==
Ranch to Market Road 189
- Location: Val Verde and Sutton counties
- Length: 33.728 mi (54.280 km)
- Existed: June 11, 1945 (Note: RM 189 was designated as FM 189 from 1948 to 1959.)–present

Ranch to Market Road 189 (RM 189) is located in Val Verde and Sutton counties. It runs from SH 163 to US 277.

RM 189 was designated as on July 11, 1945, from SH 163 near Juno to the Val Verde–Sutton county line. On January 1, 1948, the road was redesignated as Farm to Market Road 189 (FM 189). On October 29, 1948, the road was extended to US 277. On October 17, 1959, the road was reverted to RM 189.

== FM 190 ==
Farm to Market Road 190
- Location: Dimmit County
- Length: 13.278 mi (21.369 km)
- Existed: June 11, 1945–present

Farm to Market Road 190 (FM 190) is located in Dimmit County. It runs from US 83 through Asherton to SH 85.

FM 190 was designated on June 11, 1945, from US 83 through Asherton to SH 85. On May 22, 1958, it was extended northwest over the old route of US 83.

== FM 191 ==
Farm to Market Road 191
- Location: Zavala and Dimmit counties
- Length: 6.291 mi (10.124 km)
- Existed: June 11, 1945–present

Farm to Market Road 191 (FM 191) is located in Dimmit and Zavala counties. It runs from US 277 to US 83 north of Carrizo Springs.

FM 191 was designated on June 11, 1945, along the current route.

== FM 192 ==
Farm to Market Road 192
- Location: Hudspeth County
- Length: 25.447 mi (40.953 km)
- Existed: June 11, 1945–present

Farm to Market Road 192 (FM 192) is located in Hudspeth County. It generally parallels the Rio Grande for its entire length.

The southern terminus of FM 192 is along the Rio Grande in unincorporated Hudspeth County. From here, the road proceeds northwestward, paralleling the river and passing Fort Quitman and Esperanza, before ending at SH 20 at McNary.

FM 192 was designated on June 11, 1945, from US 80 (present-day SH 20) at McNary, via Esperanza, to the Arroyo Balluco, at a distance of approximately 12.0 miles (19.3 km). On July 21, 1949, the route was extended 13.8 miles (22.2 km) further down the river to the Cox School, at its present southern terminus.

Junction list

The entire route is in Hudspeth County.

Location	mi	km	Destinations	Notes
	0.0	0.0	Ranch Road – Indian Hot Springs	Southern terminus
			FM 34	
			FM 2217	
McNary			SH 20 – Fort Hancock	Former US 80
1.000 mi = 1.609 km; 1.000 km = 0.621 mi

== FM 193 ==
Farm to Market Road 193
- Location: Crosby, Dickens, and King counties
- Length: 78.753 mi (126.741 km)
- Existed: June 11, 1945–present

Farm to Market Road 193 (FM 193) is located in Crosby, Dickens, and King counties. It runs from FM 378 eastward through Dumont to US 83.

FM 193 was designated on June 11, 1945, from US 83 westward 6.0 miles (9.7 km) toward Dumont. On July 15, 1949, it was extended west 3.0 miles (4.8 km). On May 23, 1951, the designation was extended west and south 3.7 miles (6.0 km) though Dumont to a road intersection. On October 15, 1955, the road was extended west to FM 265. On November 1, 1960, it was extended west to FM 378, replacing part of FM 265 and all of FM 1441 and FM 1063.

== FM 194 ==
Farm to Market Road 194
- Location: Lamar and Red River counties
- Length: 6.716 mi (10.808 km)
- Existed: July 22, 1952–present

Farm to Market Road 194 (FM 194) is located in Lamar and Red River counties. It runs from US 82 in Blossom southeastward to FM 410 south of Detroit.

FM 194 was designated on July 22, 1952, along the current route.

=== FM 194 (1945) ===
Farm to Market Road 194
- Location: Motley County
- Existed: June 11, 1945–November 20, 1951

A previous route numbered FM 194 was designated on June 11, 1945, from Flomot to a point 2.0 miles (3.2 km) miles north. On November 20, 1951, FM 194 was extended north to the Briscoe County line. On January 3, 1952, FM 194 was cancelled and transferred to FM 599.

== FM 195 ==
Farm to Market Road 195
- Location: Lamar and Red River counties
- Length: 36.005 mi (57.944 km)
- Existed: June 11, 1945–present

Farm to Market Road 195 (FM 195) is located in Lamar and Red River counties. It runs from US 82 in Paris northeastward to SH 37 near Albion.

FM 195 was designated on June 11, 1945, from Paris to Novice. On April 30, 1947, the road was extended 4.2 miles (6.8 km) to the Red River County line. On November 23, 1948, the road was extended 2.2 miles (3.5 km) to Woodland. On December 17, 1952, the road was extended 8.2 miles (13.2 km) to Manchester. On October 31, 1958, the road was extended 5.9 miles (9.5 km) to FM 862 (now FM 410). On November 9, 1960, the road was extended east to SH 37 near Albion, replacing a section of FM 862.

== FM 196 ==
Farm to Market Road 196
- Location: Lamar and Red River counties
- Length: 33.038 mi (53.170 km)
- Existed: June 11, 1945–present

Farm to Market Road 196 (FM 196) is located in Lamar and Red River counties. The road begins at FM 195 at Faught, and from FM 194 in Blossom, the road heads southward via Pattonville and eastward via Cunningham to SH 37 near Bogata.

FM 196 was designated on June 11, 1945, from Pattonville to Cunningham. On December 17, 1952, FM 196 was extended north to FM 194 in Blossom. On January 16, 1953, FM 196 was extended north to FM 195, replacing FM 1185. On October 31, 1958, FM 196 was extended east from Cunningham to SH 37.

== FM 197 ==
Farm to Market Road 197
- Location: Lamar County
- Length: 19.920 mi (32.058 km)
- Existed: June 11, 1945–present

Farm to Market Road 197 (FM 197) is located in Lamar County. The road begins at FM 79 near Direct, and heads northward and eastward via Ragtown and Forest Chapel to US 271 in Arthur City.

FM 197 was designated on June 11, 1945, from Arthur City to Forest Chapel. On August 25, 1949, FM 197 was extended 8.8 miles (14.2 km) to Ragtown. On January 8, 1952, FM 197 was extended to FM 79.

== FM 198 ==
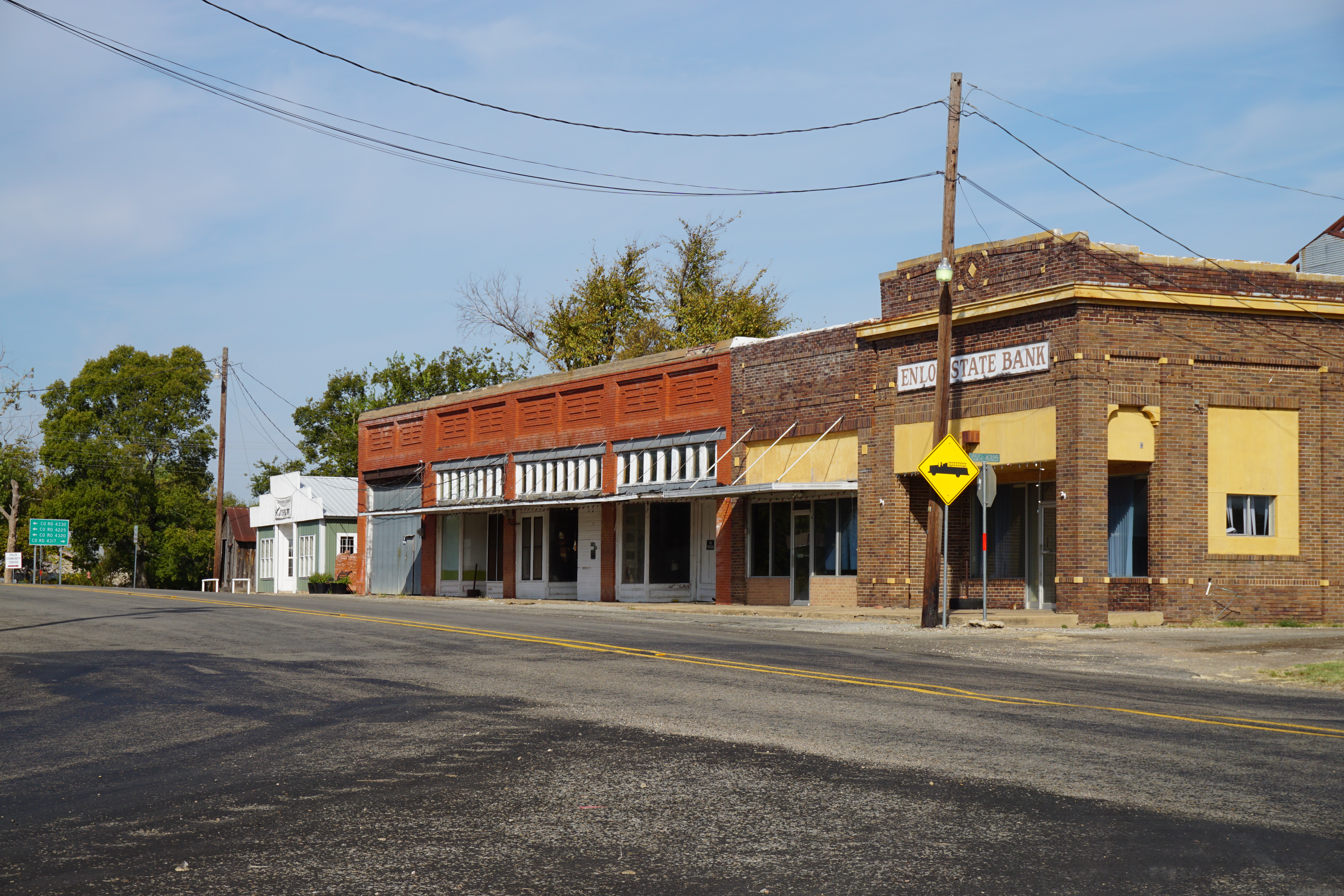
FM 198 in Enloe

Farm to Market Road 198
- Location: Delta County
- Length: 13.348 mi (21.482 km)
- Existed: June 11, 1945–present

Farm to Market Road 198 (FM 198) is located in Delta County.

FM 198 was designated on June 11, 1945, from FM 128 east to Enloe. On November 23, 1948, FM 198 was extended northeast to SH 154 in Lake Creek. On September 28, 1949, FM 198 was extended southeast to its current terminus at FM 895.

== FM 199 ==
Farm to Market Road 199
- Location: Somervell County
- Length: 7.976 mi (12.836 km)
- Existed: June 12, 1945–present

Farm to Market Road 199 (FM 199) is located in Somervell County.

FM 199 was designated on June 12, 1945, from Nemo northward across US 67 to Alta Vista School. On October 23, 1948, FM 199 was extended southwest 2.5 miles (4.0 km) from Nemo. On December 17, 1952, FM 199 was extended west 3.5 miles (5.6 km) from Alta Vista School.

Junction list

The entire route is in Somervell County.

Location	mi	km	Destinations	Notes
	0.0	0.0	County Road 403 / County Road 409	
	0.7	1.1	FM 200 east	South end of FM 200 overlap
Nemo	1.4	2.3	FM 200 west / County Road 407	North end of FM 200 overlap
	2.3	3.7	US 67 south – Glen Rose	South end of US 67 overlap
	2.5	4.0	US 67 north – Cleburne	North end of US 67 overlap
	3.9	6.3	FM 2174 north	
	7.2	11.6	County Road 307 / County Road 319	
1.000 mi = 1.609 km; 1.000 km = 0.621 mi: Concurrency terminus
