= Pearl, Texas =

- Unincorporated community
- Location within Texas Location within the United States
- Coordinates: 31°24′37″N 97°2′6″W
- Country: United States
- State: Texas
- County: Coryell
- Elevation: 1,221 ft (372 m)
- Time zone: UTC-6 (Central (CST))
  - Summer (DST): UTC-5 (CDT)
- Area code: 254
- GNIS feature ID: 1380335

Pearl is an unincorporated community in Coryell County, in the U.S. state of Texas. According to the Handbook of Texas, the community had a population of 125 in 2000. It is located within the Killeen-Temple-Fort Hood metropolitan area.

== History ==
Pearl hosts a Bluegrass festival at its community center the first Saturday of every month except September, in which it is the second Saturday.

== Geography ==
Pearl is located 22 mi (35 km) west of Gatesville, 60 mi (97 km) west of Waco, and 30 mi (48 km) northeast of Lampasas in northwestern Coryell County.

== Education ==
The community had one school, was turned into a community center after its district was absorbed into the Evant Independent School District in 1958.
