= Whitson, Texas =

- Unincorporated community
- Location within Texas Location within the United States
- Coordinates: 31°20′2″N 97°26′26″W
- Country: United States
- State: Texas
- County: Coryell
- Elevation: 722 ft (220 m)
- Time zone: UTC-6 (Central (CST))
  - Summer (DST): UTC-5 (CDT)
- Area code: 254
- GNIS feature ID: 1380776

Whitson is an unincorporated community in Coryell County, in the U.S. state of Texas. According to the Handbook of Texas, the community had a population of 30 in 2000. It is located within the Killeen-Temple-Fort Hood metropolitan area.

== History ==
Whitson was named for a local resident, Numa M. Whitson, who moved to the county in the mid-1870s. A post office was established at Whitson in 1891 and remained in operation until 1901. The community had two cotton gins and a general store at one point. The population was 42 from the 1930s to the 1960s, then went down to 30 from the 1970s through 2000.

== Geography ==
Whitson is located 20 mi (32 km) southeast of Gatesville in the eastern corner of Coryell County.

== Education ==
Today, the community is served by the Moody Independent School District.
