= Crawford Independent School District =

School district in Texas

Crawford Independent School District is a public school district based in Crawford, Texas (USA).

Located in McLennan County, small portions of the district extend into Coryell and Bosque counties.

Crawford ISD has two campuses:

- Crawford High School (Grades 7-12),
- Crawford Elementary School (Grades PK-6) (2004 National Blue Ribbon School).

In 2009, the school district was rated "exemplary" by the Texas Education Agency.

== Controversy ==
In July 2024, the ACLU of Texas sent Crawford Independent School District a letter, alleging that the district's 2023-2024 dress and grooming code appeared to violate the Texas CROWN Act, a state law which prohibits racial discrimination based on hair texture or styles, and asking the district to revise its policies for the 2024-2025 school year.
