= Jonesboro, Texas =

- Unincorporated community
- Location within the state of Texas Jonesboro (the United States)
- Coordinates: 31°36′55″N 97°52′33″W
- Country: United States
- State: Texas
- County: Coryell and Hamilton
- Elevation: 965 ft (294 m)
- Time zone: UTC-6 (Central (CST))
  - Summer (DST): UTC-5 (CDT)
- ZIP code: 76538
- Area code: 254
- GNIS feature ID: 1374322

Jonesboro is an unincorporated community in Coryell and Hamilton counties in Central Texas, United States. The Coryell County portion of the community is part of the Killeen–Temple–Fort Hood Metropolitan Statistical Area.

The United States Postal Service operates the Jonesboro Post Office.

== History ==
William L. and David Jones built a steam-powered sawmill and gristmill on the Leon River in 1866. It was first settled sometime after the Civil War and was named as Jones Mill. The local church and Masonic organization shared a large frame building in this area that was built from 1869 to 1873. Its post office was established in 1871, with Charles Pate as postmaster. The community's name was changed to Jonesboro in 1877 and had 350 residents. It was served by two steam-powered gristmills and cotton gins, a sawmill, and three churches in the mid-1880s. The population boomed to 700 during the next decade, which declined when the Stephenville North and South Texas Railway bypassed the community in 1911, after which it went down to 450 in 1914. Despite the improvement of the economy in 1930s, the community went into another decline when Texas State Highway 36 was built. The population was 378 from the 1930s to the mid-1960s and continued to fall to 200 from the mid-1970s through 2000.

An article reporting the murder of Sandeela Kanwal mistook the place of the murder for Jonesboro.

== Geography ==
Jonesboro is located at the intersection of Texas State Highway 36 and Farm to Market Road 1602, 19 mi (31 km) northwest of Gatesville, 13 mi (21 km) southeast of Hamilton, and 57 mi (92 km) west of Waco on the Hamilton-Coryell County line.

=== Climate ===
The climate is characterized by hot, humid summers and generally mild to cool winters. According to the Köppen Climate Classification system, Jonesboro has a humid subtropical climate, abbreviated "Cfa" on climate maps.

== Education ==
Jonesboro had its own school until in the mid-1880s. The first classes were held in the building where the church and Masonic organization met. The community is served by the Jonesboro Independent School District, which includes Jonesboro School.

== Notable person ==
- Cloyce Box, who played football at Jonesboro School.
