= Jonesboro Independent School District =

School district in Texas

Coordinates: 31.6154°N 97.8851°W

Jonesboro Independent School District is a public school district based in the community of Jonesboro, Texas (USA).

Located in Coryell County, small portions of the district extend into Hamilton and Bosque counties.

In February 2015 the district had 178 students. In February 2015 the Texas Education Agency ordered Jonesboro ISD to close permanently in July. It had received below standard academic ratings for the prior six years. Jonesboro ISD began seeking an informal review in order to prevent its closure. Superintendent Matt Dossey stated that he did not anticipate any permanent closure of the district.

== Academic achievement ==
In 2009, the school district was rated "recognized" by the Texas Education Agency.

== Special programs ==
=== Athletics ===
Jonesboro High School plays six-man football.

== See also ==
- List of school districts in Texas
- List of high schools in Texas

== See also ==
- Jonesboro School
