= Coryell County, Texas =

County in Texas, United States

- County
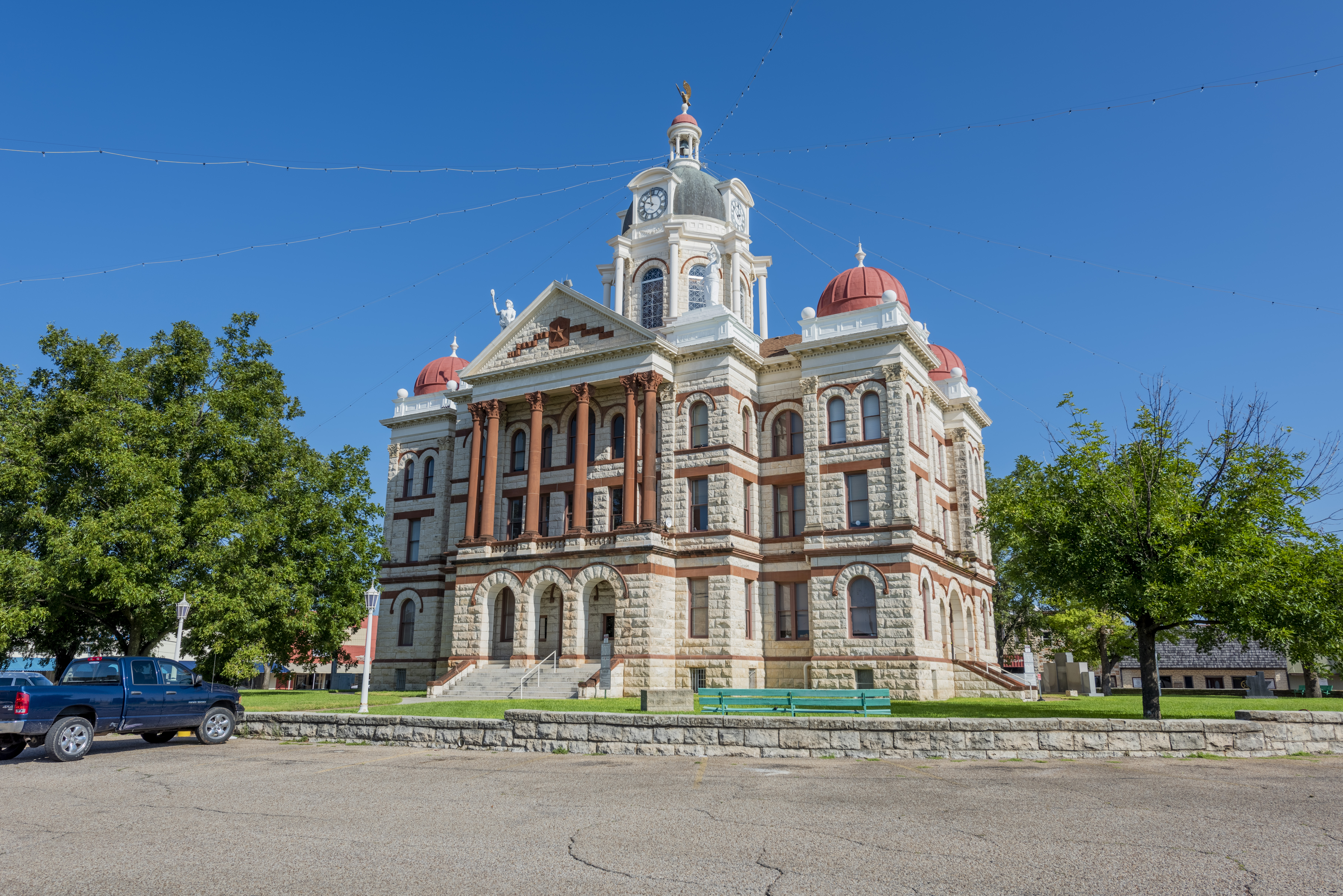
- The Coryell County Courthouse in Gatesville, Texas. The courthouse was added to the National Register of Historic Places on August 18, 1977.

- Location within the U.S. state of Texas
- Coordinates: 31°23′N 97°48′W
- Country: United States
- State: Texas
- Founded: 1854
- Seat: Gatesville
- Largest city: Copperas Cove

Area
  - Total: 1,057 sq mi (2,740 km^{2})
  - Land: 1,052 sq mi (2,720 km^{2})
  - Water: 4.7 sq mi (12 km^{2}) 0.4%

Population (2020)
  - Total: 83,093
  - Estimate (2025): 85,592 ▲
  - Density: 78.99/sq mi (30.50/km^{2})
- Time zone: UTC−6 (Central)
  - Summer (DST): UTC−5 (CDT)
- Congressional district: 31st
- Website: www.coryellcounty.org

Coryell County (/ˈkɔːrjɛl/ KOR-yel) is a county located on the Edwards Plateau in the U.S. state of Texas. As of the 2020 census, its population was 83,093. The county seat is Gatesville. The county is named for James Coryell, a frontiersman and Texas Ranger who was killed by Caddo Indians. Coryell County is part of the Killeen–Temple metropolitan statistical area.

== History ==
Habitation of Coryell County dates as far back as 4500 BC. The Tonkawa, Lipan Apache, Kiowa, and Comanche were among the tribes who migrated through the area at various periods. When the General Colonization Law went into effect in 1824, followed by the 1825 State Colonization Law of Coahuila y Tejas, Robert Leftwich obtained a grant to settle 800 families in Texas. The grant went through several legal challenges, and later became Robertson's Colony, named for Sterling C. Robertson. The grant encompassed all or parts of 30 present-day Texas counties. Settlers began moving into the area after Fort Gates was established at Gatesville. The Texas state legislature created the county in 1854, naming it after Texas Ranger James Coryell. Originally, Coryell was to be named Pierce County, but the name was changed after James Coryell's death at the hands of Caddo Indians.

== Geography ==
According to the U.S. Census Bureau, the county has a total area of 1,057 square miles (2,740 km^{2}), of which 4.7 sq mi (12 km^{2}) (0.4%) are covered by water.

=== Major highways ===
- Interstate 14/U.S. Highway 190
- U.S. Highway 84
- U.S. Highway 281
- State Highway 9
- State Highway 36
- State Highway 236

=== Adjacent counties ===
- Bosque County (north)
- McLennan County (northeast)
- Bell County (southeast)
- Lampasas County (southwest)
- Hamilton County (northwest)

== Demographics ==
Historical population
Census	Pop.	Note	%±
1870	412		—
1880	10,924		2,551.5%
1890	16,873		54.5%
1900	21,308		26.3%
1910	21,703		1.9%
1920	20,601		−5.1%
1930	19,999		−2.9%
1940	20,226		1.1%
1950	16,284		−19.5%
1960	23,961		47.1%
1970	35,311		47.4%
1980	56,767		60.8%
1990	64,213		13.1%
2000	74,978		16.8%
2010	75,388		0.5%
2020	83,093		10.2%
2025 (est.)	85,592	▲	3.0%
U.S. Decennial Census; 1850–2010 2010 2020

=== 2020 census ===
As of the 2020 census, the county had a population of 83,093, and the median age was 31.6 years. 24.7% of residents were under the age of 18 and 10.8% of residents were 65 or older, and for every 100 females there were 99.7 males while there were 98.7 males for every 100 females age 18 and over.

The racial makeup of the county was 60.8% White, 14.9% Black or African American, 0.8% American Indian and Alaska Native, 2.3% Asian, 1.3% Native Hawaiian and Pacific Islander, 7.8% from some other race, and 12.1% from two or more races. Hispanic or Latino residents of any race comprised 19.8% of the population.

80.5% of residents lived in urban areas, while 19.5% lived in rural areas.

There were 25,757 households in the county, of which 39.9% had children under the age of 18 living in them. Of all households, 52.3% were married-couple households, 16.7% were households with a male householder and no spouse or partner present, and 25.6% were households with a female householder and no spouse or partner present. About 23.5% of all households were made up of individuals and 8.1% had someone living alone who was 65 years of age or older.

There were 28,717 housing units, of which 10.3% were vacant. Among occupied housing units, 53.8% were owner-occupied and 46.2% were renter-occupied. The homeowner vacancy rate was 1.9% and the rental vacancy rate was 8.8%.

=== Racial and ethnic composition ===
Coryell County, Texas – Racial and ethnic composition Note: the US Census treats Hispanic/Latino as an ethnic category. This table excludes Latinos from the racial categories and assigns them to a separate category. Hispanics/Latinos may be of any race.
Race / Ethnicity (NH = Non-Hispanic)	Pop 1980	Pop 1990	Pop 2000	Pop 2010	Pop 2020	% 1980	% 1990	% 2000	% 2010	% 2020
White alone (NH)	39,609	42,681	45,381	46,776	46,213	69.77%	66.47%	60.53%	62.05%	55.62%
Black or African American alone (NH)	10,609	13,293	15,976	11,450	11,760	18.69%	20.70%	21.31%	15.19%	14.15%
Native American or Alaska Native alone (NH)	342	397	517	439	414	0.60%	0.62%	0.69%	0.58%	0.50%
Asian alone (NH)	1,261	1,507	1,253	1,332	1,816	2.22%	2.35%	1.67%	1.77%	2.19%
Native Hawaiian or Pacific Islander alone (NH)	x	x	334	632	1,041	x	x	0.45%	0.84%	1.25%
Other race alone (NH)	283	92	170	191	389	0.50%	0.14%	0.23%	0.25%	0.47%
Mixed race or Multiracial (NH)	x	x	1,923	2,595	4,978	x	x	2.56%	3.44%	5.99%
Hispanic or Latino (any race)	4,663	6,243	9,424	11,973	16,482	8.21%	9.72%	12.57%	15.88%	19.84%
Total	56,767	64,213	74,978	75,388	83,093	100.00%	100.00%	100.00%	100.00%	100.00%

=== 2000 census ===
As of the 2000 census, 74,978 people, 19,950 households, and 15,780 families were residing in the county. The population density was 71 people per square mile (27 people/km^{2}). The 21,776 housing units averaged 21 per square mile (8.1/km^{2}). The racial makeup of the county was 65.28% White, 21.80% African American, 0.88% Native American, 1.75% Asian, 0.49% Pacific Islander, 6.26% from other races, and 3.54% from two or more races. About 12.57% of the population were Hispanics or Latinos of any race.

Of the 19,950 households, 47.70% had children under the age of 18 living with them, 64.80% were married couples living together, 11.00% had a female householder with no husband present, and 20.90% were not families. About 16.90% of all households were made up of individuals, and 5.50% had someone living alone who was 65 years of age or older. The average household size was 2.91, and the average family size was 3.27.

In the county, the age distribution was 26.20% under 18, 17.90% from 18 to 24, 36.30% from 25 to 44, 13.80% from 45 to 64, and 5.70% who were 65 or older. The median age was 28 years. For every 100 females, there were 105.30 males. For every 100 females age 18 and over, there were 106.20 males.

The median income for a household in the county was $35,999, and for a family was $38,307. Males had a median income of $24,236 versus $21,186 for females. The per capita income for the county was $14,410. About 7.80% of families and 9.50% of the population were below the poverty line, including 12.30% of those under age 18 and 9.00% of those age 65 or over.

== Government and infrastructure ==
Of the eight Texas Department of Criminal Justice general correctional facilities for women, which include five prisons and three state jails, five of the units, including four prisons and one state jail, are in the City of Gatesville.

The Christina Crain Unit prison (formerly Gatesville Unit), the Hilltop Unit prison, the Dr. Lane Murray Unit prison, and the Linda Woodman Unit state jail are co-located among one another. In addition the Mountain View Unit, a prison with the State of Texas female death row, is in Gatesville. One male prison, the Alfred D. Hughes Unit, is in Gatesville.

Mountain View opened in July 1975, Crain opened in August 1980, Hilltop opened in November 1981, and Hughes opened in January 1990. Murray opened in November 1995, and Woodman opened in June 1997. In 1995, of the counties in Texas, Coryell had the third-highest number of state prisons and jails, after Walker and Brazoria.

=== Politics ===
United States presidential election results for Coryell County, Texas
Year	Republican		Democratic		Third party(ies)	
Year	No.	%	No.	%	No.	%
1912	67	4.73%	1,271	89.76%	78	5.51%
1916	188	9.10%	1,802	87.26%	75	3.63%
1920	444	16.31%	1,542	56.65%	736	27.04%
1924	429	12.66%	2,890	85.28%	70	2.07%
1928	1,123	46.21%	1,306	53.74%	1	0.04%
1932	191	5.39%	3,347	94.52%	3	0.08%
1936	150	6.75%	2,064	92.85%	9	0.40%
1940	549	14.82%	3,155	85.16%	1	0.03%
1944	413	13.07%	2,518	79.71%	228	7.22%
1948	310	11.23%	2,350	85.11%	101	3.66%
1952	1,658	40.52%	2,432	59.43%	2	0.05%
1956	1,509	38.86%	2,372	61.09%	2	0.05%
1960	1,477	35.23%	2,700	64.41%	15	0.36%
1964	877	19.22%	3,679	80.61%	8	0.18%
1968	1,698	28.99%	2,987	51.00%	1,172	20.01%
1972	5,077	79.75%	1,235	19.40%	54	0.85%
1976	4,140	46.37%	4,710	52.75%	79	0.88%
1980	5,494	55.38%	4,097	41.30%	329	3.32%
1984	9,056	74.24%	3,113	25.52%	30	0.25%
1988	7,461	64.17%	4,026	34.63%	140	1.20%
1992	6,144	42.93%	4,157	29.05%	4,011	28.03%
1996	7,143	51.23%	5,300	38.01%	1,501	10.76%
2000	10,321	68.41%	4,493	29.78%	273	1.81%
2004	12,421	70.47%	5,122	29.06%	82	0.47%
2008	11,550	63.00%	6,619	36.11%	163	0.89%
2012	11,220	67.57%	5,158	31.06%	226	1.36%
2016	12,225	66.98%	5,064	27.74%	964	5.28%
2020	15,438	65.60%	7,565	32.14%	532	2.26%
2024	16,688	69.75%	6,959	29.09%	279	1.17%

United States Senate election results for Coryell County, Texas1
Year	Republican		Democratic		Third party(ies)	
Year	No.	%	No.	%	No.	%
2024	15,775	66.35%	7,276	30.60%	726	3.05%

United States Senate election results for Coryell County, Texas2
Year	Republican		Democratic		Third party(ies)	
Year	No.	%	No.	%	No.	%
2020	15,372	66.12%	7,118	30.62%	759	3.26%

Texas Gubernatorial election results for Coryell County
Year	Republican		Democratic		Third party(ies)	
Year	No.	%	No.	%	No.	%
2022	11,652	71.19%	4,450	27.19%	266	1.63%

== Communities ==
=== Cities ===
- Copperas Cove (small parts in Lampasas and Bell Counties)
- Gatesville (county seat)
- McGregor (mostly in McLennan County)
- Oglesby

=== Towns ===
- Evant (partly in Hamilton County)
- South Mountain

=== Census-designated places ===
- Flat
- Fort Hood (partly in Bell County)
- Mound

=== Former census-designated places ===
- Montague Village, annexed to Fort Hood CDP (now Fort Cavazos CDP) prior to the 1990 U.S. census.

=== Unincorporated communities ===
- Ames
- Arnett
- Ater
- Bee House
- Coryell City
- Hurst Springs
- Ireland
- Jonesboro (partly in Hamilton County)
- King
- Leon Junction
- Levita
- Osage
- Pancake
- Pearl
- Pidcoke
- Purmela
- South Purmela
- The Grove
- Topsey
- Turnersville
- Whitson

== Education ==
School districts include:

- Clifton Independent School District
- Copperas Cove Independent School District
- Crawford Independent School District
- Evant Independent School District
- Gatesville Independent School District
- Jonesboro Independent School District
- Killeen Independent School District
- Lampasas Independent School District
- Moody Independent School District
- Oglesby Independent School District
- Valley Mills Independent School District

All of the county is in the service area of Central Texas College.

Gatesville has the Gatesville Public Library.

== See also ==
- List of museums in Central Texas
- National Register of Historic Places listings in Coryell County, Texas
- Recorded Texas Historic Landmarks in Coryell County
