= Gatesville Independent School District =

School district in Texas

Gatesville Independent School District is a public school district based in Gatesville, Texas, United States.

In addition to Gatesville, the district serves the town of South Mountain, the census-designated places of Flat and Mound, as well as rural areas in central Coryell County. A very small portion of Bell County also lies within the district.

In 2009, the school district was rated "academically acceptable" by the Texas Education Agency.

== Schools ==
- Gatesville High (grades 9–12)
- Gatesville Junior High (grades 7–8)
- Gatesville Intermediate (grades 4–6)
- Gatesville Elementary (grades 1–3)
  - 2004 National Blue Ribbon School
- Gatesville Primary (prekindergarten and kindergarten)
