= Midway High School (Clay County, Texas) =

Location
- 12142 State Highway 148 South; Henrietta, Texas 76365; United States
- Coordinates: 33.6285°N 98.2009°W

Information
- School type: Public high school
- Established: 1941
- School district: Midway Independent School District (Clay County, Texas)
- Superintendent: Randall Beaver
- Principal: Daniel Hutchins
- Teaching staff: 16.73 (FTE)
- Grades: K-12
- Enrollment: 131 (2017-18)
- Student to teacher ratio: 7.83
- Colors: Red, white, & royal blue
- Athletics conference: UIL Class A
- Mascot: Falcon
- Website: midwayisd.net

Midway High School or Henrietta Midway is a public high school located on SH 148 south near the community of Joy, Texas, United States and classified as a 1A school by the UIL. It is part of the Midway Independent School District (Clay County, Texas) located in south central Clay County. All grades (K-12) are housed in one building. For the 2021-2022 school year, the school was given a "B" by the Texas Education Agency.

== Athletics ==
The Midway Falcons compete in the following sports

- Basketball
- Cross country
- Golf
- Tennis
- Track and field

=== State titles ===
- Boys Basketball
  - 1959(B)
- Girls Basketball
  - 1961(B)
- Track
  - 2021(1A)

== Academics ==
- UIL Academic Meet Champions
  - 1998(1A)
