= Vashti, Texas =

- Unincorporated community
- Location within Texas Location within the United States
- Coordinates: 33°33′20″N 98°02′27″W
- Country: United States
- State: Texas
- County: Clay
- Elevation: 1,083 ft (330 m)
- Time zone: UTC-6 (Central (CST))
  - Summer (DST): UTC-5 (CDT)
- Area code: 940
- GNIS feature ID: 1370596

Vashti is an unincorporated community in southeastern Clay County in the U.S. state of Texas. According to the Handbook of Texas, the community had a population of 80 in 2000. It is located within the Wichita Falls metropolitan area.

== History ==
Dave Taylor founded Vashti between 1880 and 1891. In 1891, he named a post office after his favorite niece, Vashti Strahan. Vashti had 264 residents in the 1920s, and the town was home to several businesses, including a cotton gin, three general merchandise stores, a pharmacy, and a blacksmith shop. There were also two fraternal orders and six churches in the area. Vashti was generally steady throughout the 1930s and 1940s, but it entered a decline phase in the 1950s as farming became less viable and better roads promoted more movement. After 1930, the post office closed. 140 people were living in Vashti by the middle of the 1950s, a number the town kept track of until the late 1980s. Vashti had five rated companies in 1956–1957, but by the late 1980s, none remained. The main industries in the area included fruit production, dairy farming, pottery manufacturing, and cattle husbandry. The Vashti community center was the core of Vashti's social life in the 1980s. The population dropped to 80 by 2000, and in 2009, local authorities projected that 70 people were living there. The population went up to 100 in 2010, then returned to 70 in 2019.

Vashti Strahan served as postmistress when the post office opened.

== Geography ==
Vashti is located at the intersection of Farm to Market Roads 174 and 1288, 18 mi (29 km) southeast of Henrietta and 4 mi (6.4 km) south of Bellevue in southeastern Clay County.

== Education ==
In 1904, Vashti had a school with 69 students and two teachers. Today, Vashti is served by the Bellevue Independent School District.
