= Joy, Texas =

- Unincorporated community
- Location within the state of Texas Joy (the United States)
- Coordinates: 33°34′34″N 98°12′57″W
- Country: United States
- State: Texas
- County: Clay
- Elevation: 1,066 ft (325 m)
- Time zone: UTC−05:00 (Eastern (EST))
  - Summer (DST): UTC−04:00 (EDT)
- GNIS feature ID: 1360440

Joy is an unincorporated community in southern Clay County, Texas, United States. According to the Handbook of Texas, the community had a population of 100 in 2000. It is located within the Wichita Falls metropolitan area.

== History ==
North of the settlement, Joy Creek flows through the Joy oilfield. When a group of pioneers from Fannin County founded Joy in the early 1880s, it was known as Fanninton, Fannintown, or Fannin Town. A Methodist church was founded in 1881. Gainesville was the supply hub for the early settlers. The Red River Cattle Company fenced a sizable area after becoming interested in the surrounding grasslands. Fence-cutting was first a municipal problem before the state government criminalized it in 1884. Joy was the new name given to the village when a post office opened there in 1895 and remained in operation until the 1930s. In 1914, Joy had 23 residents, a general store, a blacksmith, and telephone lines. Its population increased to 37 in the ensuing decade, and reports of it were available there until the early 1940s, when it was estimated to have reached 150, including seven businesses. In 1942, oil was found in the Joy field. Joy had one business reported by the early 1960s. The village still had three churches and a cemetery in the 1980s, while the neighboring Joy field boasted fourteen wells in 1990, producing a total of 25,000,000 barrels of crude oil. In 1990, Joy's population was still listed at 150. By 2000, the population had fallen to 100. The population went up to 110 in 2019.

On May 19, 2015, a brief EF0 tornado that caused no damage struck Joy. On May 22, 2020, an EFU tornado struck Joy. Multiple storm chasers observed this tornado but no damage was found.

== Geography ==
Joy is located at the intersection of Farm to Market Road 173 and Texas State Highway 148, 16 mi (26 km) south of Henrietta, 30 mi (48 km) southeast of Wichita Falls, 20 mi (32 km) west of Bowie and 20 mi (32 km) north of Jacksboro in southern Clay County.

== Education ==
Joy's first school was taught in an abandoned log house in 1881. Today, Joy is served by the Midway Independent School District.

== Notable people ==
- Irven DeVore, anthropologist and evolutionary biologist.
- Lucian W. Parrish, U.S. Representative who attended school in Joy.
