= Stanfield, Texas =

- Unincorporated community
- Location within Texas Location within the United States
- Coordinates: 33°58′09″N 97°59′59″W
- Country: United States
- State: Texas
- County: Clay
- Elevation: 866 ft (264 m)
- Time zone: UTC-6 (Central (CST))
  - Summer (DST): UTC-5 (CDT)
- Area code: 940
- GNIS feature ID: 1380928

Stanfield is an unincorporated community in Clay County, Texas, United States. According to the Handbook of Texas, the community had a population of 15 in 2000. It is located within the Wichita Falls metropolitan area.

== History ==
Joe Campbell first settled in the area in 1883. The community got its name from the Stanfield Brothers Ranch, which later acquired a 22,000 acres (8,900 ha) tract that included the settlement. Stanfield had a post office from 1903 until 1905. The town had two shops throughout the 1940s and 1950s when the population was recorded as 50. Stanfield had 30 residents by the middle of the 1960s and no enterprises. From then until 1990, it recorded a population of 25. The population was 15 in 2000.

== Geography ==
Stanfield is located on Farm to Market Road 2332, 15 mi (24 km) northeast of Henrietta in northeastern Clay County. It is a mile south of the Oklahoma border.

== Education ==
Today, Stanfield is served by the Henrietta Independent School District.
