= Buffalo Springs, Clay County, Texas =

Unincorporated community in Clay County, Texas, United States

- Unincorporated community
- Location within Texas Location within the United States
- Coordinates: 33°33′23″N 98°08′23″W
- Country: United States
- State: Texas
- County: Clay
- Elevation: 1,066 ft (325 m)
- Time zone: UTC-6 (Central (CST))
  - Summer (DST): UTC-5 (CDT)
- Area code: 940
- GNIS feature ID: 1353209

Buffalo Springs is an unincorporated community in Clay County, Texas, United States. According to the Handbook of Texas, the community had a population of 51 in 2000. It is located within the Wichita Falls metropolitan area.

== History ==
In 1864, 25 people built an outpost and attempted to create a farming community, marking the beginning of settlement in the area. Due to frequent Indian attacks and protracted drought, the settlers left the area, and it remained deserted until 1878 when brothers C. O. and J. Q. Burnett established themselves approximately 0.5 miles from the outpost's remains. In that year, the post office opened in the ensuing settlement, which was named for Buffalo Creek located nearby. Buffalo Springs had 200 residents by the middle of the 1890s, along with a few stores and two cotton gins. The main industries for the locals were farming and stockraising. By the mid-1920s, the recorded population had dropped to 115 from 125 in 1914. Buffalo Springs had many small businesses and two churches in the 1930s. Its population decreased from 100 in the 1950s to 60 by the mid-1960s and 51 in 2000 after the post office was closed in 1954.

== Geography ==
Buffalo Springs is located at the intersection of Farm to Market Roads 3077 and 174, 15 mi (24 km) south of Henrietta and 27 mi (43 km) north of Jacksboro in south-central Clay County. Fort Richardson is also located near Buffalo Springs.

== Education ==
Buffalo Springs had its own school in the 1930s. Today, the Buffalo Springs area is served by the Midway Independent School District.

== See also ==
- List of unincorporated communities in Texas
