= Petrolia High School =

Public school in Texas, United States

Location
- 8307 FM 810; Petrolia, Texas 76377-0176; United States; 34.023181°N 98.239165°W

Information
- School type: Public high school
- School district: Petrolia Consolidated Independent School District
- Principal: Daniele Hensley
- Teaching staff: 21.07 (FTE)
- Grades: 9-12
- Enrollment: 206 (2022-23)
- Student to teacher ratio: 9.78
- Colors: Orange & White
- Athletics conference: UIL Class 2A
- Mascot: Pirates/Lady Pirates
- Website: Petrolia High School

Petrolia High School is a public high school located in the community of Petrolia, Texas (USA) and classified as a 2A school by the UIL. It is part of the Petrolia Independent School District located in west central Clay County. The school serves Petrolia, Dean, and Byers.

== History ==
A consolidation vote with neighboring Byers Independent School District was held in 2012 due to dwindling enrollment at Byers School. Students from Byers began attending Petrolia in the fall of 2012. For the 2021-2022 school year, the school was given a "B" by the Texas Education Agency.

== Athletics ==
The Petrolia Pirates compete in the following sports:

- Baseball
- Basketball
- Cross Country
- Football
- Golf
- Powerlifting
- Softball
- Tennis
- Track and Field
- Volleyball

=== State titles ===
- Football
  - 2002(1A)

== Notable alumni ==
Matt Odom
