= Bluegrove, Texas =

- Unincorporated community
- Location within Texas Location within the United States
- Coordinates: 33°40′26″N 98°13′48″W
- Country: United States
- State: Texas
- County: Clay
- Elevation: 997 ft (304 m)
- Time zone: UTC-6 (Central (CST))
  - Summer (DST): UTC-5 (CDT)
- Area code: 940
- GNIS feature ID: 1352502

Bluegrove is an unincorporated community in Clay County, Texas, United States. According to the Handbook of Texas, the community had a population of 125 in 2000. It is located within the Wichita Falls metropolitan area.

== History ==
Three men named E.A. Copp, L.B. Brown, and E.M. Childs helped to bring settlers to Bluegrove in 1882. It was given this name because it is located near a grove of post oak trees that look blue from a distance. A.W. Flynn opened a general store here that quickly became a shipping point for farmers and ranchers in the area. A post office was established at Bluegrove in 1895. The population grew steadily, reaching its zenith of 240 in the 1920s. It soon declined two decades later. The population went down to 125 from the 1950s through 2000. Bluegrove is the headquarters for the JAC Electric Cooperative, which also serves Jack and Archer counties.

== Geography ==
Bluegrove is located on Farm to Market Road 172, 11 mi (18 km) south of Henrietta in central Clay County.

== Education ==
Today, the community is served by the Midway Independent School District.
