= Dean, Texas =

- City
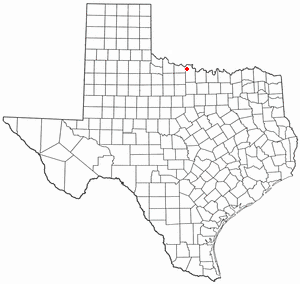
- Location of Dean, Texas

- Coordinates: 33°55′12″N 98°22′18″W
- Country: United States
- State: Texas
- County: Clay

Area
  - Total: 2.14 sq mi (5.55 km^{2})
  - Land: 2.13 sq mi (5.52 km^{2})
  - Water: 0.012 sq mi (0.03 km^{2})
- Elevation: 981 ft (299 m)

Population (2020)
  - Total: 488
  - Density: 229/sq mi (88.4/km^{2})
- Time zone: UTC-6 (Central (CST))
  - Summer (DST): UTC-5 (CDT)
- FIPS code: 48-19456
- GNIS feature ID: 2410305

Dean is a city in Clay County, Texas, United States. It is part of the Wichita Falls, Texas Metropolitan Statistical Area. The population was 488 at the 2020 census.

== Geography ==
Dean is located in northwestern Clay County. Texas State Highway 79 passes through the community, leading southwest 10 miles (16 km) to Wichita Falls and northeast 8 miles (13 km) to Petrolia.

According to the United States Census Bureau, Dean has a total area of 2.1 square miles (5.5 km^{2}), of which 0.01 square miles (0.03 km^{2}), or 0.56%, is water.

== Demographics ==
Historical population
Census	Pop.	Note	%±
1980	212		—
1990	277		30.7%
2000	341		23.1%
2010	493		44.6%
2020	488		−1.0%
U.S. Decennial Census; 2020 Census

=== 2020 census ===
As of the 2020 census, Dean had a population of 488, and the median age was 44.8 years, with 20.1% of residents under the age of 18 and 21.3% aged 65 years or older. For every 100 females there were 104.2 males, and for every 100 females age 18 and over there were 102.1 males age 18 and over.

There were 189 households in Dean, of which 32.8% had children under the age of 18 living in them. Of all households, 67.2% were married-couple households, 13.8% were households with a male householder and no spouse or partner present, and 16.4% were households with a female householder and no spouse or partner present. About 19.1% of all households were made up of individuals and 11.1% had someone living alone who was 65 years of age or older.

There were 211 housing units, of which 10.4% were vacant. The homeowner vacancy rate was 0.0% and the rental vacancy rate was 20.0%.

0.0% of residents lived in urban areas, while 100.0% lived in rural areas.

Racial composition as of the 2020 census
Race	Number	Percent
White	427	87.5%
Black or African American	0	0.0%
American Indian and Alaska Native	7	1.4%
Asian	0	0.0%
Native Hawaiian and Other Pacific Islander	0	0.0%
Some other race	7	1.4%
Two or more races	47	9.6%
Hispanic or Latino (of any race)	58	11.9%

=== 2000 census ===
As of the census of 2000, there were 341 people, 131 households, and 105 families residing in the city. The population density was 159.2 inhabitants per square mile (61.5/km^{2}). There were 136 housing units at an average density of 63.5 per square mile (24.5/km^{2}). The racial makeup of the city was 95.60% White, 0.88% African American, 0.29% Native American, 2.05% from other races, and 1.17% from two or more races. Hispanic or Latino of any race were 5.28% of the population.

There were 131 households, out of which 31.3% had children under the age of 18 living with them, 65.6% were married couples living together, 10.7% had a female householder with no partner present, and 19.8% were non-families. 17.6% of all households were made up of individuals, and 9.2% had someone living alone who was 65 years of age or older. The average household size was 2.60 and the average family size was 2.90.

In the city, the population was spread out, with 25.5% under the age of 18, 5.6% from 18 to 24, 30.2% from 25 to 44, 25.5% from 45 to 64, and 13.2% who were 65 years of age or older. The median age was 39 years. For every 100 females, there were 94.9 males. For every 100 females age 18 and over, there were 91.0 males.

The median income for a household in the city was $45,568, and the median income for a family was $47,813. Males had a median income of $36,875 versus $19,844 for females. The per capita income for the city was $16,521. About 8.2% of families and 7.8% of the population were below the poverty line, including 1.8% of those under age 18 and 9.7% of those age 65 or over.

== Education ==
Dean is served by the Petrolia Independent School District, including Petrolia High School.
