= Hurnville, Texas =

- Unincorporated community
- Location within Texas Location within the United States
- Coordinates: 33°57′31″N 98°10′10″W
- Country: United States
- State: Texas
- County: Clay
- Elevation: 922 ft (281 m)
- Time zone: UTC-6 (Central (CST))
  - Summer (DST): UTC-5 (CDT)
- Area code: 940
- GNIS feature ID: 1379979

Hurnville is an unincorporated community in Clay County, Texas, United States. According to the Handbook of Texas, the community had a population of 15 in 2000. It is located within the Wichita Falls metropolitan area.

== History ==
Hurnville was established in 1890, and within a few years, newly arrived Russians with German ancestry made up the majority of the population. The settlement was served by a post office from 1891 to 1905, and in 1894, the German Baptist church was founded by the immigrant residents. Hurnville had 2 businesses and 20 residents in 1936. The population stayed the same, but by the mid-1960s no businesses operated locally. The population in 1990 was fifteen. That figure remained unchanged in 2000.

== Geography ==
Hurnville is located at the intersection of Farm to Market Roads 1197 and 2332, 8 mi (13 km) north of Henrietta in north-central Clay County.

== Education ==
The Hurnville area is served by the Henrietta Independent School District.
