= Wichita Falls metropolitan area =

- Metropolitan Statistical Area
- Wichita Falls, TX Metropolitan Statistical Area
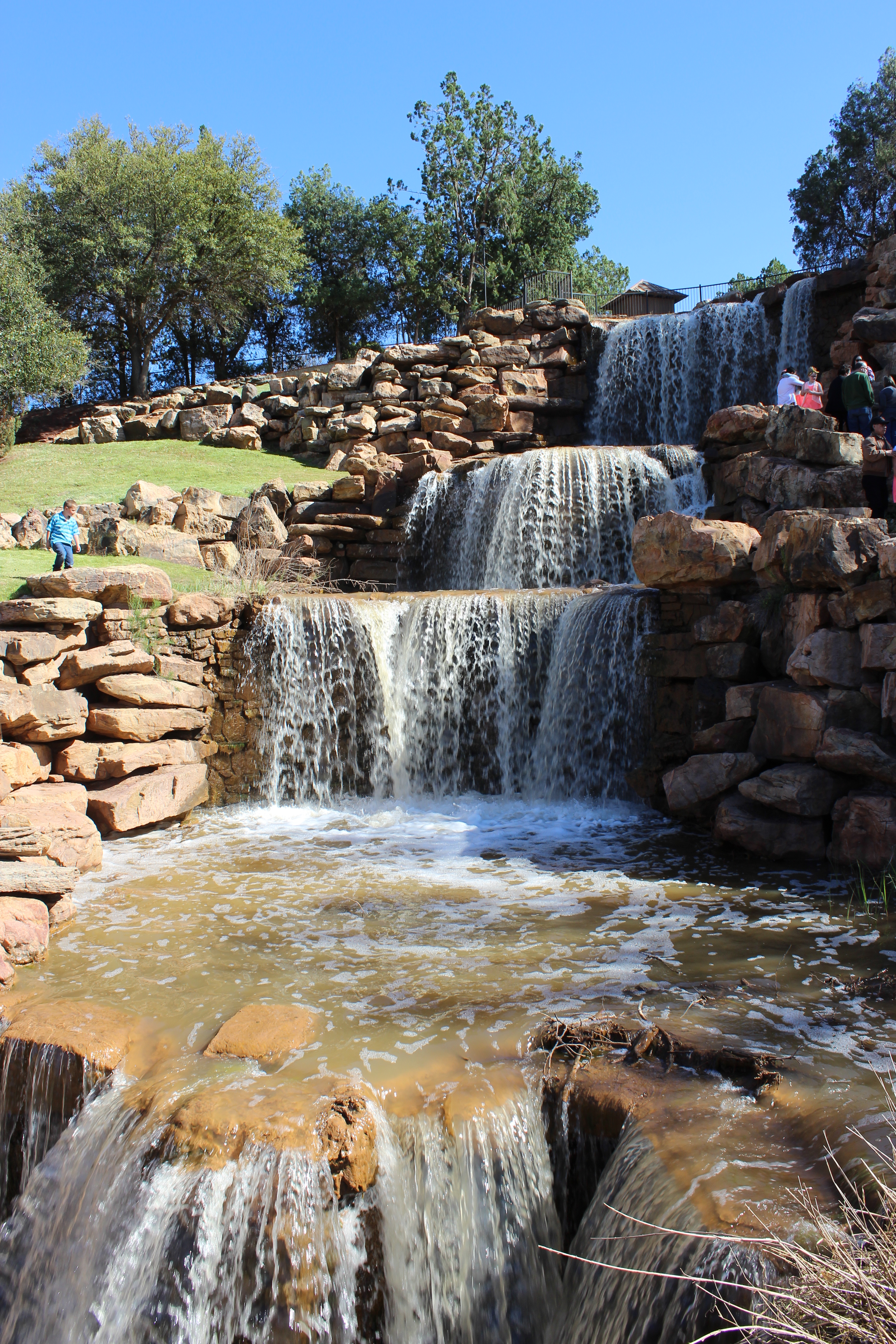
- Man-made waterfall attraction in Lucy Park
Interactive Map of Wichita Falls, TX MSA
City of Wichita Falls
Wichita Falls, TX MSA
- Country: United States
- State: Texas
- Principal city: Wichita Falls
- Time zone: UTC-6 (CST)
  - Summer (DST): UTC-5 (CDT)

The Wichita Falls metropolitan statistical area is a metropolitan area in North Texas that covers three counties – Archer, Clay, and Wichita. As of the 2010 census, the MSA had a population of 151,306 (though a July 1, 2011 estimate placed the population at 150,261).

== Counties ==
- Archer
- Clay
- Wichita

== Communities ==
=== Places with more than 100,000 people ===
- Wichita Falls (Principal City)

=== Places with 1,000 to 15,000 people ===
- Archer City
- Burkburnett
- Electra
- Henrietta
- Holliday
- Iowa Park

=== Places with 500 to 1,000 people ===
- Byers
- Lakeside City
- Petrolia

=== Places with less than 500 people ===
- Bellevue
- Cashion Community
- Dean
- Jolly
- Megargel
- Pleasant Valley
- Scotland
- Windthorst

Harold,texas

=== Unincorporated places ===
- Bluegrove
- Buffalo Springs
- Dundee
- Halsell
- Haynesville
- Huff
- Hurnville
- Joy
- Kamay
- Mankins
- Shannon
- Stanfield
- Thornberry
- Valley View
- Vashti

== Demographics ==
As of the census of 2000, there were 151,524 people, 56,109 households, and 38,587 families residing within the MSA. The racial makeup of the MSA was 80.95% White, 8.92% African American, 0.89% Native American, 1.61% Asian, 0.08% Pacific Islander, 5.05% from other races, and 2.51% from two or more races. Hispanic or Latino of any race were 11.17% of the population.

The median income for a household in the MSA was $36,011 and the median income for a family was $42,812. Males had a median income of $29,662 versus $21,660 for females. The per capita income for the MSA was $17,542.

== See also ==
- List of cities in Texas
- List of museums in North Texas
- Texas census statistical areas
- List of Texas metropolitan areas
