= Lucian W. Parrish =

American politician from Texas (1878–1922)

Lucian Walton Parrish
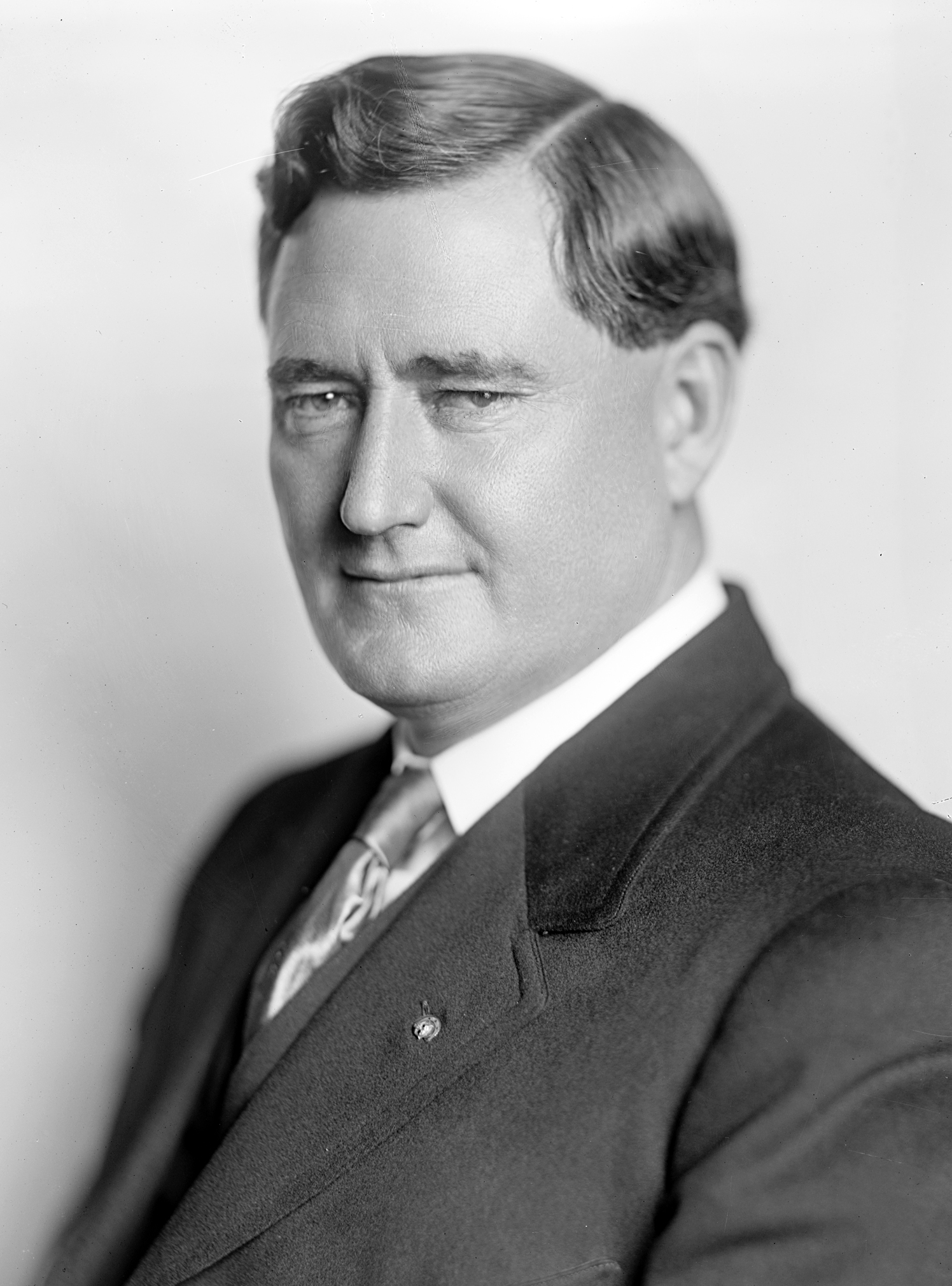
- Harris & Ewing Collection, Library of Congress

Member of the U.S. House of Representatives from Texas's 13th district
- In office March 4, 1919 – March 27, 1922
- Preceded by: John Marvin Jones
- Succeeded by: Guinn Williams

Personal details
- Born: January 10, 1878 Sister Grove, Van Alstyne, Texas, U.S.
- Died: March 27, 1922 (aged 44) Wichita Falls, Texas, U.S.
- Resting place: Hope Cemetery, Henrietta, Texas, U.S.
- Party: Democratic
- Education: University of Texas at Austin

Lucian Walton "Father" Parrish (January 10, 1878 – March 27, 1922) was a U.S. representative from Texas, and a star college athlete and coach.

Born in Sister Grove, near Van Alstyne, Texas, Parrish moved with his parents to Clay County in 1887 and settled near Joy, Texas where they owned a ranch. He attended the public schools of Joy and Bowie, Texas, and the North Texas State Normal College at Denton, Texas (now the University of North Texas).

== College athlete ==
After teaching school for two years, he attended the University of Texas from 1903-1906 where he played football and ran track. Parrish was a guard on the Varsity football team, and captained the team in 1906 helping them to go 9-1 and 4-0 in conference play and made the all-Southern Team every year. He captained the track team in 1904. He also served as president of the Political and Economic Association and of the Student Association.

He stayed at Texas to go to Law School and served as an assistant coach for 2 years under coach W. E. Metzenthin in 1907-08 during which time the team went 11-5-1. He graduated from the law department of the University of Texas at Austin with M.A. and law degrees in 1909.

In 1913 he was He was chosen for an all-time Texas team by R. W. Franklin and in 1970 he was named to the Longhorn Hall of Honor.

== Political career ==
Parrish was admitted to the bar in 1909 and commenced practice in Henrietta, Texas and practiced law with William Wantland. A lifelong Democrat, Parrish was elected as to the Sixty-sixth and Sixty-seventh Congresses and served from March 4, 1919 until his death in 1921

== Death ==
Parrish was campaigning for the nomination for U.S. Senator for Texas when he was seriously injured in an automobile crash on March 15, 1922. Parrish was driving from Anson to Roby when his car plunged off a bridge over the Cottonwood Creek in Fisher County. He injured his skull and broke his jaw. He was taken to a hospital in Stamford. His condition got worse and he was transferred to a hospital in Wichita Falls. Twelve days after he was hurt, he died at the age of 44 of cerebral meningitis, which had developed during his convalescence. He was interred in Hope Cemetery in Henrietta.

== See also ==
- List of members of the United States Congress who died in office (1900–1949)

== Sources ==
- United States Congress. "Lucian W. Parrish (id: P000083)". Biographical Directory of the United States Congress.
- Parrish, Lucius Walton

U.S. House of Representatives
Preceded by John M. Jones	Member of the U.S. House of Representatives from Texas's 13th congressional district March 4, 1919 – March 27, 1922	Succeeded by Guinn Williams
