= Henrietta High School =

Location
- 1700 East Crafton Street; Henrietta, Texas 76365; United States
- Coordinates: 33.819808°N 98.178739°W

Information
- Type: Public high school
- School district: Henrietta Independent School District
- Principal: Dr. Cara Farnsworth
- Teaching staff: 31.17 (FTE)
- Grades: 9-12
- Enrollment: 295 (2023-2024)
- Student to teacher ratio: 9.46
- Colors: Black and gold
- Team name: Bearcats
- Website: Official website

Henrietta High School is a public high school located in Henrietta, Texas, United States. It is the sole high school in the Henrietta Independent School District. For the 2021-2022 school year, the school was given an "A" by the Texas Education Agency.

== Athletics ==
The Henrietta Bearcats compete in the following sports:

- Baseball
- Basketball
- Cross Country
- Football
- Golf
- Powerlifting
- Softball
- Tennis
- Track and Field
- Volleyball
- Wrestling
