= Bellevue High School (Texas) =

Bellevue School

Location
- 500 7th Street; Bellevue, Texas 76228; United States; 33.630823°N 98.015630°W

Information
- Type: Public high school
- School district: Bellevue Independent School District
- Superintendent: Dean Gilstrap
- Principal: Michael Qualls
- Teaching staff: 17.54 (FTE)
- Grades: K-12
- Enrollment: 181 (2023-2024)
- Student to teacher ratio: 10.32
- Color
- Athletics conference: UIL Class 1A
- Team name: Eagles
- Website: Official website

Bellevue High School, also known as Bellevue School, is a public high school located in Bellevue, Texas (USA). It is the sole high school in the Bellevue Independent School District and is classified as a 1A school by the UIL. For the 2021-2022 school year, the school was given a "C" by the Texas Education Agency.

== Athletics ==
The Bellevue Eagles compete in the following sports:

- Basketball
- Cross Country
- Golf
- Tennis
- Track and Field
