= Raymond, Texas =

Ghost town in Texas, US

Raymond
- Ghost town
- Location in Texas
- Coordinates: 33.8781540°N 98.3964396°W
- Country: United States
- State: Texas
- County: Clay
- Elevation: 1,070 ft (326 m)
- USGS Feature ID: 1380417

Raymond is a ghost town in Clay County, Texas, United States.

== History ==
Raymond is situated on U.S. Route 287 and the Fort Worth and Denver Railway. It was established in the late nineteenth century.
