= Huff, Texas =

- Ghost town
- Coordinates: 33°46′07″N 98°32′14″W
- Country: United States
- State: Texas
- County: Archer
- Elevation: 981 ft (299 m)
- Time zone: UTC-6 (Central (CST))
  - Summer (DST): UTC-5 (CDT)
- GNIS feature ID: 1359791

Huff (also known as Hufftown, and later as Huff Community) is a ghost town in northeastern Archer County, Texas, United States. It is part of the Wichita Falls, Texas Metropolitan Statistical Area.

Huff lies adjacent to Lake Creek, 8 mi (13 km) south of Lakeside City, just east of Texas State Highway 79.

== History ==
The town was named for Charles C. Huff, an attorney for the Wichita Falls and Southern Railway. In 1908, the railroad founded the town site as a switching site. Next to the tracks, they built a giant concrete cistern that held a rail tank car-full of water that the railroad hauled in for the community's source of fresh water.

A post office operated at Huff from 1909 to 1913, as did a blacksmith shop, a general store, and a school. By 1936, only a school and some scattered dwellings remained. The town site became a gathering place for area cattle ranchers, using the old school as a community center.

== Geography ==
Lakeside City is located at 33°46′07″N 98°32′14″W (33.830714,-98.538943).
