= Guinn Williams =

American politician

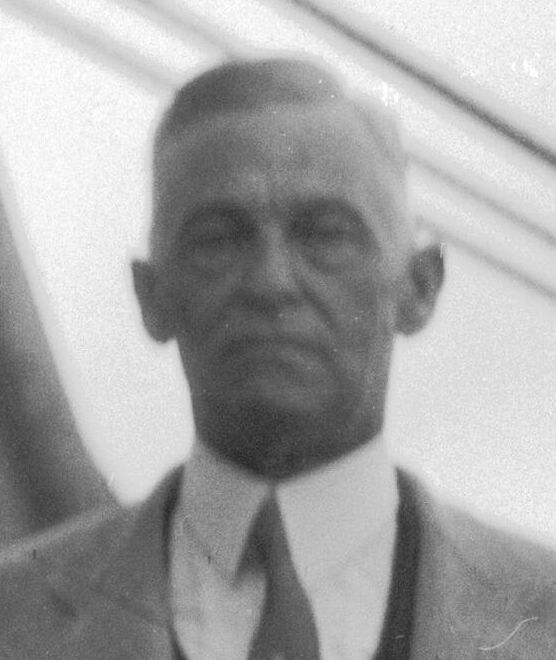
- Williams in 1930

Member of the U.S. House of Representatives from Texas's 13th district
- In office May 22, 1922 – March 3, 1933
- Preceded by: Lucian W. Parrish
- Succeeded by: William D. McFarlane

Chairman of the United States House Committee on Territories
- In office March 4, 1931 – March 3, 1933
- Preceded by: Albert Johnson
- Succeeded by: Robert A. Green

Personal details
- Born: Guinn Terrell Williams; April 22, 1871 Beulah, Mississippi, U.S.
- Died: January 9, 1948 (aged 76) San Angelo, Texas, U.S.
- Resting place: Decatur Cemetery, Decatur, Texas
- Party: Democratic
- Spouse: Minnie Leatherwood (1873-1966) (m. 1893-1948, his death)
- Children: 4 (including Guinn "Big Boy" Williams)
- Education: Transylvania College
- Profession: Rancher; Farmer; Banker

Guinn Terrell Williams (April 22, 1871 – January 9, 1948) was an American banker and politician. A Democrat, he served in the Texas State Senate, and is most notable for his service as a U.S. representative from Texas. His son was the actor Guinn "Big Boy" Williams.

== Early life ==
Born near Beulah, Mississippi, Williams was the son of farmer and Confederate veteran William Washington Williams and Minerva Jane (Thompson) Williams. He moved with his parents to Nocona, Texas in 1876, and they soon relocated to Decatur in Wise County. He attended the public schools of Wise County, and then received his qualification as a school teacher. He taught for several terms, and attended Transylvania College in Lexington, Kentucky.

== Start of career ==
After his 1890 graduation, Williams became active in ranching and farming, and also pursued a career in banking. After gaining his initial experience as cashier of the State National Bank in Fort Worth, he was an incorporator of Decatur's City National Bank, and served as its vice president. His later ventures included establishing and serving as president of banks in cities and towns including Mineral Wells, Perrin, Bridgeport, and Paradise.

A Democrat, Williams served as Wise County Clerk from 1898 to 1902. In 1919, he was elected to the Texas State Senate, and he served from 1920 to 1922.

== U.S. Congressman ==
In 1922, Williams was elected to the 67th Congress, filling the vacancy caused by the death of United States Representative Lucian W. Parrish. He was reelected to the 68th Congress and to the four succeeding Congresses, and served from May 22, 1922 to March 3, 1933. During his U.S. House tenure, Williams served on the Insular Affairs, Expenditures in the Executive Departments, and Territories committees.

Williams was chairman of the Committee on Territories in the 72nd Congress. He was an advocate of independence for the Philippines, and statehood for Hawaii.

== Later career ==
Williams did not run for reelection in 1932. After leaving the House in March 1933, he was appointed to manage the Regional Agricultural Credit Corporation in San Angelo, Texas. In addition, he was active with the Texas Production Credit Corporation, Texas Goat Raisers Association, and Texas Wool and Mohair Company.

== Civic involvement ==
Williams was active in the Methodist churches of Decatur and San Angelo, and was an officer of the Sons of Confederate Veterans of Texas. He was also a 32nd degree Mason, and his Masonic activities included creating an educational fund that enabled six to ten male residents of the Masonic Orphanage in Fort Worth to attend college each year.

== Retirement and death ==
Williams died in San Angelo, Texas on January 9, 1948. He was interred in Decatur Cemetery in Decatur, Texas.

== Legacy ==
A street in Manila, Philippines is named for Williams in recognition of his work on the Committee on Territories.

== Family ==
In 1893, Williams married Minnie Leatherwood (1873-1966). They were the parents of three daughters and one son, actor Guinn "Big Boy" Williams.

== Sources ==
=== Books ===
- Guttery, Ben R. (2008). Representing Texas. Scotts Valley, CA: BookSurge.com. ISBN 978-1-4196-7884-4.

=== Internet ===
- Minor, David (June 15, 2010). "Biography, Guinn Terrell Williams". Handbook of Texas Online. Austin, TX: Texas State Historical Association.

U.S. House of Representatives
| Preceded by Lucian W. Parrish | Member of the U.S. House of Representatives from Texas's 13th congressional district May 22, 1922 – March 3, 1933 | Succeeded by William D. McFarlane |
