= William D. McFarlane =

American politician (1894–1980)

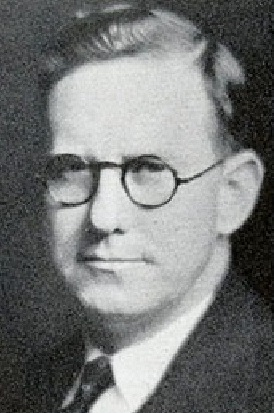
- From 1935's Pictorial Directory of 74th Congress

Member of the U.S. House of Representatives from Texas's 13th district
- In office March 4, 1933 – January 3, 1939
- Preceded by: Guinn Williams
- Succeeded by: Ed Gossett

Personal details
- Born: William Doddridge McFarlane; July 17, 1894 Greenwood, Arkansas, U.S.
- Died: February 18, 1980 (aged 85) Graham, Texas, U.S.
- Resting place: Oak Grove Cemetery
- Party: Democratic
- Education: University of Arkansas

William Doddridge McFarlane (July 17, 1894 – February 18, 1980) was a United States representative from Texas.

Born in Greenwood, Arkansas, McFarlane attended public schools and the University of Arkansas at Fayetteville 1909-1914. He engaged in the mercantile business in Greenwood, Arkansas, from 1914 to 1918. During the First World War, he was commissioned a second lieutenant in August 1918, and served until honorably discharged on December 13, 1918. He returned to the University of Arkansas in 1919 and received his Bachelor of Arts degree that year from Kent Law School, Chicago, Illinois, and his LL.B. in 1921; later, in his 70s, he completed his J.D. there in 1969. He was admitted to the bar in 1921 and commenced practice in Graham, Texas.

He served as member of the Texas House of Representatives from 1923 to 1927, and then in the Texas State Senate from 1927 to 1931.

McFarlane was elected as a Democratic Representative for Texas's 13th congressional district to the Seventy-third and to the two succeeding Congresses (March 4, 1933 – January 3, 1939). He was an unsuccessful candidate for renomination in 1938 to the Seventy-sixth Congress.

He resumed the practice of law, and served as special assistant to the attorney general at Texarkana, Texas, from 1941 to 1944, and then as director of the Surplus Property Smaller War Plants Corporation, Washington, DC, from December 1944 to January 1946. He served as special assistant to the Attorney General in Washington, DC, January 1946 to July 1, 1951.

He was an unsuccessful candidate in 1951 to fill the vacancy in the Eighty-second Congress. He subsequently served in the Lands Division of the Justice Department from December 1, 1951, until his retirement on August 1, 1966, when he again resumed the practice of law.

He was the father of five children: Mary, Betty, Bill, Barbara, and Robert. Son Robert McFarlane was the National Security Advisor to President Ronald Reagan from 1983 until late 1985. William McFarlane and his wife Inez resided in Graham, Texas, where he died February 18, 1980. He was interred in Oak Grove Cemetery.

U.S. House of Representatives
Preceded by Guinn Williams	Member of the U.S. House of Representatives from Texas's 13th congressional district 1933–1939	Succeeded by Ed Gossett
