= Clay County, Texas =

County in Texas, United States

- County
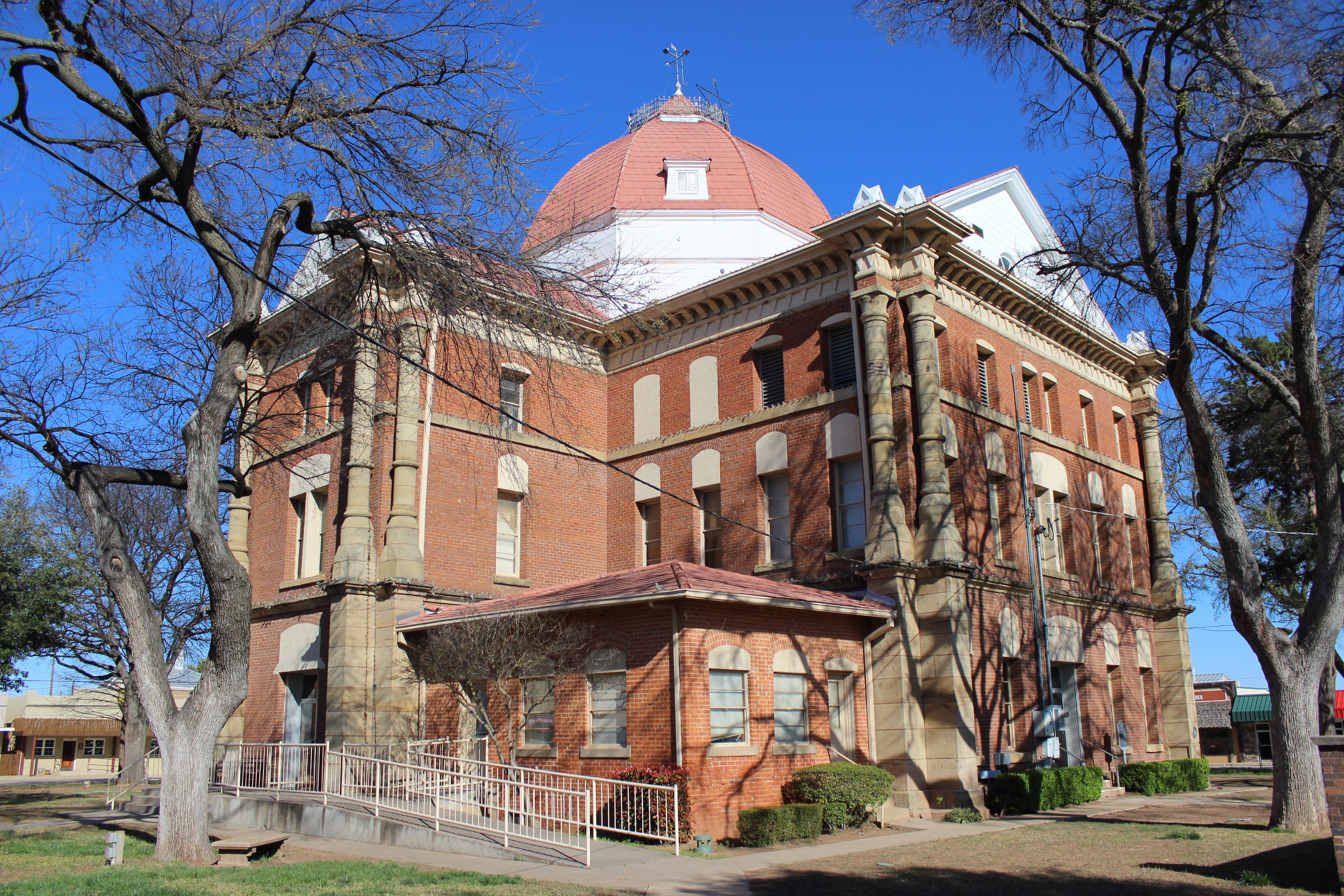
- Clay County Courthouse in Henrietta

- Location within the U.S. state of Texas
- Coordinates: 33°47′N 98°13′W
- Country: United States
- State: Texas
- Founded: 1860
- Named for: Henry Clay
- Seat: Henrietta
- Largest city: Henrietta

Area
  - Total: 1,117 sq mi (2,890 km^{2})
  - Land: 1,089 sq mi (2,820 km^{2})
  - Water: 28 sq mi (73 km^{2}) 2.5%

Population (2020)
  - Total: 10,218
  - Estimate (2025): 10,764 ▲
  - Density: 9/sq mi (3.5/km^{2})
- Time zone: UTC−6 (Central)
  - Summer (DST): UTC−5 (CDT)
- Congressional district: 13th
- Website: www.claycountytx.net

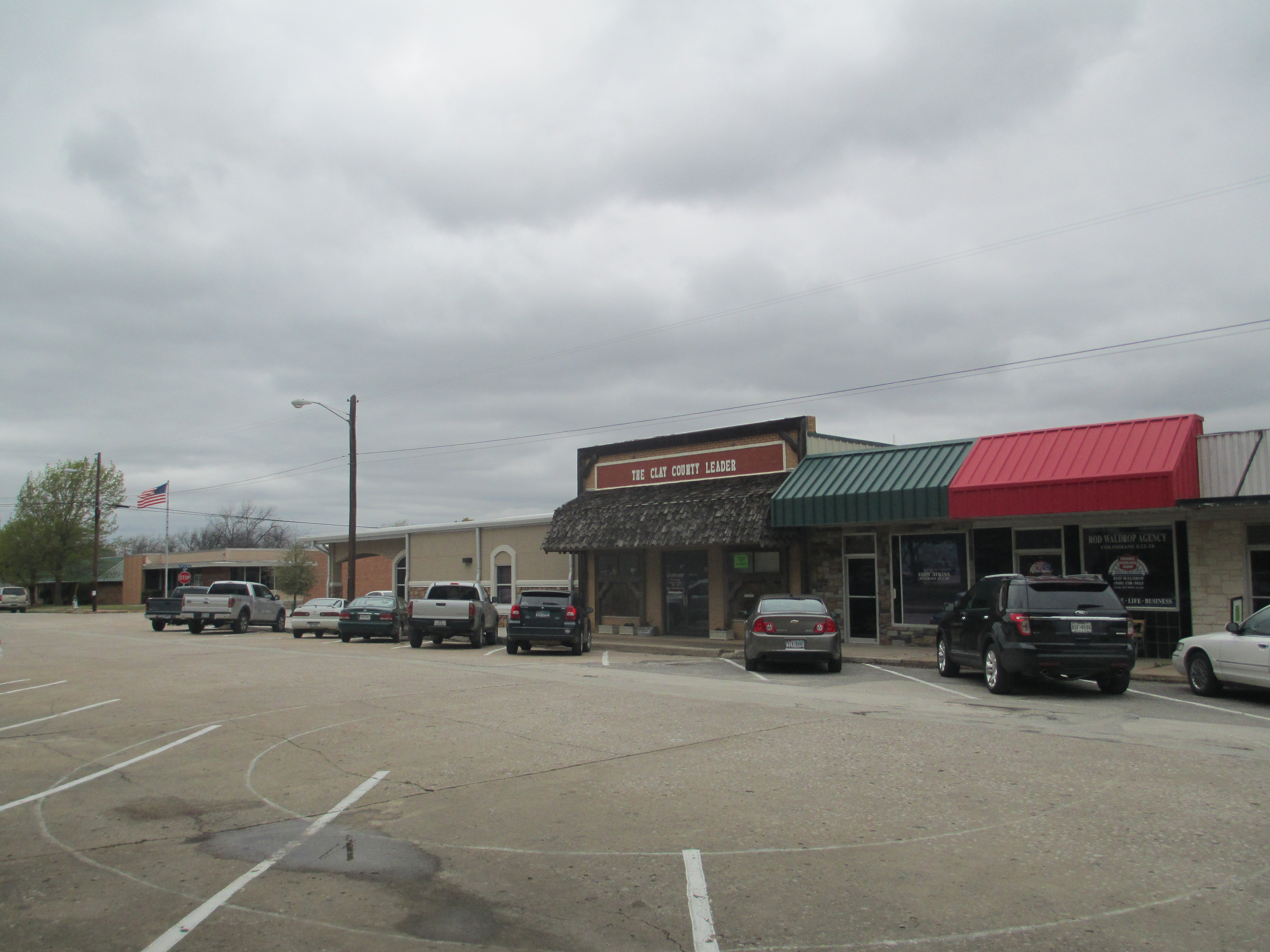
The Clay County Leader newspaper office in Henrietta

Clay County is a county located in the U.S. state of Texas. As of the 2020 census, its population was 10,218. The county seat is Henrietta. The county was founded in 1857 and later organized in 1860. It is named in honor of Henry Clay, famous American statesman, Kentucky Senator and United States Secretary of State. Clay County is part of the Wichita Falls, Metropolitan Statistical Area in North Texas.

The Wichita Falls rancher, oilman, and philanthropist Joseph Sterling Bridwell owned a ranch in Clay County, among his multiple holdings.

== Geography ==
According to the U.S. Census Bureau, the county has a total area of 1,117 square miles (2,890 km^{2}), of which 1,089 square miles (2,820 km^{2}) is land and 28 square miles (73 km^{2}) (2.5%) is water.

Lake Arrowhead State Park, a 524-acre (212 ha) development on Lake Arrowhead in Clay County, encompasses 14,390-acre (5,820 ha) acres. The lakeshore extends 106 miles; the park offers bicycling, birding, boating, camping, canoeing, fishing, hiking, horseback riding, nature study, picnicking, swimming, and wildlife observation.

=== Adjacent counties ===
- Jefferson County, Oklahoma (north)
- Montague County (east)
- Jack County (south)
- Archer County (west)
- Wichita County (northwest)
- Cotton County, Oklahoma (northwest)

== Demographics ==
Historical population
Census	Pop.	Note	%±
1860	109		—
1880	5,045		—
1890	7,503		48.7%
1900	9,231		23.0%
1910	17,043		84.6%
1920	16,864		−1.1%
1930	14,545		−13.8%
1940	12,524		−13.9%
1950	9,896		−21.0%
1960	8,351		−15.6%
1970	8,079		−3.3%
1980	9,582		18.6%
1990	10,024		4.6%
2000	11,006		9.8%
2010	10,752		−2.3%
2020	10,218		−5.0%
2025 (est.)	10,764	▲	5.3%
U.S. Decennial Census; 1850–2010 2010 2020

=== Racial and ethnic composition ===
Clay County, Texas – Racial and ethnic composition Note: the US Census treats Hispanic/Latino as an ethnic category. This table excludes Latinos from the racial categories and assigns them to a separate category. Hispanics/Latinos may be of any race.
Race / Ethnicity (NH = Non-Hispanic)	Pop 1980	Pop 1990	Pop 2000	Pop 2010	Pop 2020	% 1980	% 1990	% 2000	% 2010	% 2020
White alone (NH)	9,392	9,642	10,317	9,941	8,941	98.02%	96.19%	93.74%	92.46%	87.50%
Black or African American alone (NH)	66	33	43	53	35	0.69%	0.33%	0.39%	0.49%	0.34%
Native American or Alaska Native alone (NH)	34	84	102	115	78	0.35%	0.84%	0.93%	1.07%	0.76%
Asian alone (NH)	4	23	11	28	50	0.04%	0.23%	0.10%	0.26%	0.49%
Native Hawaiian or Pacific Islander alone (NH)	x	x	1	1	0	x	x	0.01%	0.01%	0.00%
Other race alone (NH)	3	0	4	5	31	0.03%	0.00%	0.04%	0.05%	0.30%
Mixed race or Multiracial (NH)	x	x	124	142	442	x	x	1.13%	1.32%	4.33%
Hispanic or Latino (any race)	83	242	404	467	641	0.87%	2.41%	3.67%	4.34%	6.27%
Total	9,582	10,024	11,006	10,752	10,218	100.00%	100.00%	100.00%	100.00%	100.00%

=== 2020 census ===
As of the 2020 census, the county had a population of 10,218. The median age was 47.0 years. 20.3% of residents were under the age of 18 and 23.2% of residents were 65 years of age or older. For every 100 females there were 98.7 males, and for every 100 females age 18 and over there were 97.3 males age 18 and over.

The racial makeup of the county was 89.8% White, 0.4% Black or African American, 0.9% American Indian and Alaska Native, 0.5% Asian, <0.1% Native Hawaiian and Pacific Islander, 1.9% from some other race, and 6.5% from two or more races. Hispanic or Latino residents of any race comprised 6.3% of the population.

<0.1% of residents lived in urban areas, while 100.0% lived in rural areas.

There were 4,262 households in the county, of which 27.5% had children under the age of 18 living in them. Of all households, 57.8% were married-couple households, 16.4% were households with a male householder and no spouse or partner present, and 21.2% were households with a female householder and no spouse or partner present. About 25.5% of all households were made up of individuals and 13.7% had someone living alone who was 65 years of age or older.

There were 5,129 housing units, of which 16.9% were vacant. Among occupied housing units, 82.0% were owner-occupied and 18.0% were renter-occupied. The homeowner vacancy rate was 2.1% and the rental vacancy rate was 7.0%.

=== 2000 census ===
As of the 2000 census, there were 11,006 people, 4,323 households, and 3,181 families residing in the county. The population density was 10 people per square mile (3.9 people/km^{2}). There were 4,992 housing units at an average density of 4 per square mile (1.5/km^{2}). The racial makeup of the county was 95.35% White, 0.42% Black or African American, 1.03% Native American, 0.10% Asian, 0.01% Pacific Islander, 1.68% from other races, and 1.42% from two or more races. 3.67% of the population were Hispanic or Latino of any race. At 89.4% of the county's population, Clay County has the highest percentage of Non-Hispanic Whites in the state of Texas.

There were 4,323 households, out of which 30.70% had children under the age of 18 living with them, 63.20% were married couples living together, 7.30% had a female householder with no husband present, and 26.40% were non-families. 23.50% of all households were made up of individuals, and 11.80% had someone living alone who was 65 years of age or older. The average household size was 2.52 and the average family size was 2.98.

In the county, the population was spread out, with 24.90% under the age of 18, 6.80% from 18 to 24, 26.40% from 25 to 44, 25.90% from 45 to 64, and 16.10% who were 65 years of age or older. The median age was 40 years. For every 100 females, there were 94.00 males. For every 100 females age 18 and over, there were 93.10 males.

The median income for a household in the county was $35,738, and the median income for a family was $41,514. Males had a median income of $28,914 versus $20,975 for females. The per capita income for the county was $16,361. About 8.10% of families and 10.30% of the population were below the poverty line, including 11.70% of those under age 18 and 11.00% of those age 65 or over.

== Transportation ==
=== Major highways ===
- U.S. Highway 82
- U.S. Highway 287
- State Highway 59
- State Highway 79
- State Highway 148
- Loop 47
- Spur 510

=== Farm to market roads ===
- FM 171
- FM 172
- FM 173
- FM 174
- FM 175
- FM 1177
- FM 1197
- FM 1288
- FM 1740
- FM 1883
- FM 1954
- FM 2332
- FM 2393
- FM 2606
- FM 2847

== Communities ==
=== Cities ===
- Bellevue
- Byers
- Dean
- Henrietta (county seat)
- Jolly
- Petrolia

=== Town ===
- Windthorst (mostly in Archer County)

=== Unincorporated communities ===
- Bluegrove
- Buffalo Springs
- Charlie
- Hurnville
- Joy
- Newport (also Jack County)
- Shannon
- Stanfield
- Thornberry
- Vashti

=== Ghost towns ===
- Deer Creek
- Halsell
- Prospect
- Raymond

== Politics ==
Clay County is represented in the Texas House of Representatives by Republican James Frank, a businessman from Wichita Falls.

Prior to 1996, Clay County was strongly Democratic in presidential elections. The only Republican Party candidates who managed to win the county from 1912 to 1992 were Herbert Hoover thanks to anti-Catholic sentiment towards Al Smith as well as Richard Nixon and Ronald Reagan in their 49-state landslides of 1972 & 1984, respectively. Since 1996, the county has swung hard to supporting the Republican Party similar to almost all white-majority rural counties in the Solid South.

Clay County is located within District 69 of the Texas House of Representatives. Clay County is located within District 30 of the Texas Senate.

United States presidential election results for Clay County, Texas
Year	Republican		Democratic		Third party(ies)	
Year	No.	%	No.	%	No.	%
1912	34	4.24%	721	89.90%	47	5.86%
1916	177	11.35%	1,324	84.87%	59	3.78%
1920	446	24.49%	1,324	72.71%	51	2.80%
1924	318	17.35%	1,402	76.49%	113	6.16%
1928	1,327	53.36%	1,160	46.64%	0	0.00%
1932	151	5.98%	2,365	93.74%	7	0.28%
1936	196	8.24%	2,168	91.09%	16	0.67%
1940	427	15.30%	2,357	84.48%	6	0.22%
1944	311	10.44%	2,307	77.42%	362	12.15%
1948	332	12.85%	2,131	82.50%	120	4.65%
1952	1,272	38.36%	2,044	61.64%	0	0.00%
1956	990	35.26%	1,813	64.57%	5	0.18%
1960	1,019	37.49%	1,692	62.25%	7	0.26%
1964	659	21.82%	2,357	78.05%	4	0.13%
1968	936	29.49%	1,573	49.56%	665	20.95%
1972	1,893	64.28%	1,023	34.74%	29	0.98%
1976	1,200	31.72%	2,568	67.88%	15	0.40%
1980	1,824	44.39%	2,233	54.34%	52	1.27%
1984	2,569	58.04%	1,844	41.66%	13	0.29%
1988	2,043	47.07%	2,288	52.72%	9	0.21%
1992	1,586	32.30%	1,919	39.08%	1,405	28.62%
1996	1,997	48.00%	1,690	40.63%	473	11.37%
2000	3,112	67.11%	1,460	31.49%	65	1.40%
2004	3,971	75.09%	1,299	24.57%	18	0.34%
2008	4,213	78.91%	1,085	20.32%	41	0.77%
2012	4,266	84.36%	740	14.63%	51	1.01%
2016	4,377	87.23%	536	10.68%	105	2.09%
2020	5,069	88.13%	614	10.67%	69	1.20%
2024	5,288	89.51%	584	9.88%	36	0.61%

United States Senate election results for Clay County, Texas1
Year	Republican		Democratic		Third party(ies)	
Year	No.	%	No.	%	No.	%
2024	5,128	87.23%	663	11.28%	88	1.50%

United States Senate election results for Clay County, Texas2
Year	Republican		Democratic		Third party(ies)	
Year	No.	%	No.	%	No.	%
2020	4,958	87.01%	632	11.09%	108	1.90%

Texas Gubernatorial election results for Clay County
Year	Republican		Democratic		Third party(ies)	
Year	No.	%	No.	%	No.	%
2022	4,052	90.22%	393	8.75%	46	1.02%

== Education ==
School districts serving sections of the county include:

- Bellevue Independent School District
- Bowie Independent School District
- Burkburnett Independent School District
- Gold-Burg Independent School District
- Henrietta Independent School District
- Midway Independent School District
- Petrolia Consolidated Independent School District
- Windthorst Independent School District

The county is in the service area of Vernon College.

== See also ==
- List of museums in North Texas
- National Register of Historic Places listings in Clay County, Texas
- Recorded Texas Historic Landmarks in Clay County
