= Walter Jenkins =

American political figure (1918–1985)

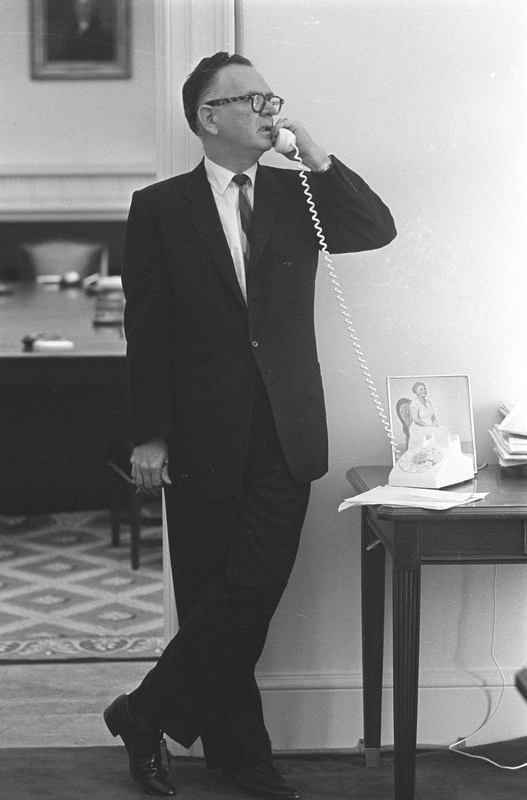
- Jenkins on the phone, 1963

White House Chief of Staff
- De facto
- In office November 22, 1963 – October 14, 1964
- President: Lyndon B. Johnson
- Preceded by: Kenneth O'Donnell
- Succeeded by: Bill Moyers (de facto)

Personal details
- Born: Walter Wilson Jenkins; March 23, 1918 Jolly, Texas, U.S.
- Died: November 23, 1985 (aged 67) Austin, Texas, U.S.
- Party: Democratic
- Spouse: Helen Whitehill (m. 1945, separated)
- Children: 6
- Education: Midwestern State University (attended); University of Texas, Austin (attended)

Military service
- Allegiance: United States
- Branch/service: United States Army
- Years of service: 1941–1945
- Battles/wars: World War II

Walter Wilson Jenkins (March 23, 1918 – November 23, 1985) was an American political figure and longtime top aide to U.S. President Lyndon B. Johnson. Jenkins' career ended after he was arrested and charged with "disorderly conduct" with another man in a public restroom in Washington, D.C. The incident happened weeks before the 1964 presidential election, in an era in which homosexuality was widely condemned.

== Personal life ==
Jenkins was born in Jolly, Texas, and spent his childhood in Wichita Falls, Texas. There he attended Midwestern State University and then spent two years at the University of Texas, though he did not earn a degree. In 1945, following his discharge from the Army, he converted to Roman Catholicism and married Helen Marjorie Whitehill.

Jenkins and his wife had six children, four boys and two girls. They separated in the early 1970s but never divorced.

== Government career ==
Jenkins began working for Lyndon B. Johnson in 1939 when Johnson was serving in the U.S. House of Representatives as the member from Texas's 10th congressional district. For most of the next 25 years, Jenkins served as Johnson's top administrative assistant, following Johnson as he rose to become a Senator, Vice President under John F. Kennedy, and President.

From 1941 until 1945, Jenkins served in the United States Army during World War II. In 1951, he returned to Wichita Falls to run for the House of Representatives. Jenkins lost to Frank N. Ikard in a race marked by attacks on Jenkins because of his Roman Catholic faith.

Johnson's former aides credit Jenkins for his ability and temperament. In 1975, journalist Bill Moyers, a former Johnson aide and press secretary, wrote in Newsweek: "When they come to canonize political aides, [Jenkins] will be the first summoned, for no man ever negotiated the shark-infested waters of the Potomac with more decency or charity or came out on the other side with his integrity less shaken. If Lyndon Johnson owed everything to one human being other than Lady Bird, he owed it to Walter Jenkins." Joseph Califano wrote, "Jenkins was the nicest White House aide I ever met in any administration. He was never overbearing. It was quite remarkable."

By the 1960s, Jenkins was more Johnson's friend than employee, close to Lady Bird Johnson and involved in their family finances as well. The Johnsons celebrated Lady Bird's fifty-first birthday at a party at Jenkins' home in December 1963.

== Scandal and resignation ==
=== Arrest ===
A month before the 1964 presidential election, on October 7, District of Columbia Police arrested Jenkins in a YMCA restroom. He and another man were booked on a disorderly conduct charge, an incident described as "perhaps the most famous tearoom arrest in America." He paid a $50 fine. Rumors of the incident circulated for several days, and Republican Party operatives helped to promote it to the press. Some newspapers, including the Chicago Tribune and the Cincinnati Enquirer, refused to run the story. Journalists quickly learned that Jenkins had been arrested on a similar charge in 1959, which made it much harder to explain away as the result of overwork or, as one journalist wrote, "combat fatigue."

Perhaps the most amazing of all events of the campaign of 1964 is that the nation faced the fact fully—and shrugged its shoulders.

— Theodore H. White in The Making of the President, 1964

Finally, on October 14, a Washington Star editor called the White House for Jenkins' comment on a story it was preparing. Jenkins turned to White House lawyers Abe Fortas, the President's personal lawyer, and Clark Clifford, who unofficially was filling the role of White House Counsel. They immediately lobbied the editors of Washington's three newspapers not to run the story, which only confirmed its significance. Within hours, Clifford detailed the evidence to the President and press secretary George Reedy, who while "openly weeping," confirmed the story to reporters. Probably forewarned, Johnson told Fortas that Jenkins needed to resign.

Anticipating the charge that Jenkins might have been blackmailed, Johnson immediately ordered an FBI investigation. He knew that J. Edgar Hoover would have to clear the administration of any security problem because the FBI itself would otherwise be at fault for failing to investigate Jenkins properly years before. Hoover reported on October 22 that security had not been compromised. Johnson later said: "I couldn't have been more shocked about Walter Jenkins if I'd heard that Lady Bird had tried to kill the Pope." He also fed conspiracy theories that Jenkins had been framed. He claimed that before his arrest Jenkins had attended a cocktail party where the waiters came from the Republican National Committee, though the party was hosted by Newsweek to celebrate the opening of its new offices. The Star printed the story and UPI transmitted its version on October 14. Jenkins resigned the same day. Johnson immediately ordered a poll to determine the public's reaction to the affair and learned the next day that its effect on the voters was negligible.

Johnson announced that only he would contact the press about the incident, but his wife, Lady Bird Johnson, issued her statement of support for Jenkins.

=== Political reactions ===
The incident embarrassed the administration but had little impact on the campaign in which Johnson led his opponent by large margins. One columnist wrote on October 15, "Walter Jenkins has revived and dramatized all the harsh feelings about morals, and political cliques, and the Texas gang in Washington." Yet the incident disappeared so quickly from the political scene that Theodore H. White, surveying the 1964 election campaign, assessed its impact this way: "For twenty-four full hours Republicans and Democrats alike held their breath to see how the nation would react. And perhaps the most amazing of all events of the campaign of 1964 is that the nation faced the fact fully—and shrugged its shoulders." Jenkins' arrest was quickly overshadowed by international affairs: Soviet premier Nikita Khrushchev was deposed on October 14, the British electorate voted Labour into power on October 15, and China successfully tested a nuclear weapon on October 16.

Johnson's Republican opponent in the 1964 presidential election, Barry Goldwater, knew Jenkins from the Senate and from serving as commanding officer of his Air Force Reserve unit, but initially denied knowing him. He did not comment on the incident while campaigning. Although it fit well with the charges he had been making about the lack of morality in Johnson's administration, those referred to Bobby Baker and Billie Sol Estes. Instead, since FBI agents had just questioned him about Jenkins, he publicly asked Hoover to explain why Jenkins had not undergone a rigorous security check before joining the White House staff.

Goldwater's campaign offices distributed bumper stickers and buttons bearing slogans such as, "LBJ – LIGHT BULB JENKINS: NO WONDER HE TURNED THE LIGHTS OUT" and "ALL THE WAY WITH LBJ, BUT DON'T GO NEAR THE YMCA". During the remainder of the campaign Goldwater occasionally alluded to the scandal. In speeches, he referred to Johnson's "curious crew who would run the country" to the knowing amusement of his audience. At the time, observers noted the difference between the way Goldwater alluded to the scandal and the way the Republican National Committee and Goldwater's running mate, William E. Miller, used it to exploit "popular fears." Goldwater later said he chose not to make the incident a campaign issue. "It was a sad time for Jenkins' wife and children, and I was not about to add to their private sorrow," he wrote in his autobiography. "Winning isn't everything. Some things, like loyalty to friends or lasting principle, are more important."

Johnson mentioned the affair in general terms while campaigning. In Pittsburgh, on October 27, he told a crowd that in government "unfortunate things" happen and people "disappoint" you. Some "make mistakes" and need to resign and there need to be impartial investigations.

Members of Congress called for an FBI investigation of the case, citing concerns that the FBI had been unaware of Jenkins' previous offense in the same Washington men's room in January 1959.

=== Supportive reactions ===
On October 15, James Reston gave some support to Johnson by confirming that "President Eisenhower was embarrassed by a comparable morals charge against one of his first appointees of his first Administration." On October 19, Drew Pearson in his "Washington Merry-go-round" column recounted the 1959 events with greater detail and named Arthur H. Vandenberg, Jr. as the Eisenhower appointee who "had homosexuality problems and could not pass a security test." Campaigning in San Diego on October 28, Johnson replied to a reporter's question about "sex deviates" in his administration that every administration had its scandals and mentioned that Eisenhower had faced a similar problem with his appointments secretary, thus confirming Pearson's outing of Vandenberg, whose departure from the Eisenhower administration had been blamed on his health.

On October 29, 1964, leading clergymen, including Francis B. Sayre, Jr. of Washington National Cathedral, United Presbyterian Church Leader Eugene Carson Blake, Methodist Bishop John Wesley Lord, American Hebrew Congregations President Maurice Eisendrauth, and theologians Paul Tillich and Reinhold Niebuhr, issued a letter commenting on the Jenkins affair: "We see the Jenkins episode as a case of human weakness. If there is a security factor involved, let that be dealt with on its own terms and let it not serve chiefly as an excuse for dwelling on this one episode to cater to the prurient curiosity or to the self-righteousness of part of the public."

After the election, the American Mental Health Foundation wrote a letter to Johnson protesting about the "hysteria" surrounding the case:

The private life and inclinations of a citizen, Government employee or not, does not necessarily have any bearing on his capacities, usefulness, and sense of responsibility in his occupation. The fact that an individual is homosexual, as has been strongly implied in the case of Mr. Jenkins, does not per se make him more unstable and more a security risk than any heterosexual person.

On November 17, Lady Bird visited Walter Jenkins and his wife Marjorie, who were preparing to move home to Texas. She reported in her diary that he had received "a barrage of mail" from acquaintances and the public that "seems so understanding." Washington columnist Joseph Alsop, like Jenkins a closeted homosexual, wrote publicly in support of Jenkins and sent him a letter of support as well.

=== Effect on Johnson administration ===
Johnson appointed Bill Moyers to succeed Walter Jenkins.

Johnson's White House Press Secretary George Reedy told an interviewer: "A great deal of the president's difficulties can be traced to the fact that Walter had to leave. ... All of history might have been different if it hadn't been for that episode." Former Attorney General Ramsey Clark said that Jenkins' resignation "deprived the president of the single most effective and trusted aide that he had. The results would be enormous when the president came into his hard times. Walter's counsel on Vietnam might have been extremely helpful."

== Later years and legacy ==
Jenkins resigned from the Air Force Reserve in February 1965.

After leaving Washington, Jenkins returned to Texas and lived the rest of his life in Austin, where he worked as a Certified Public Accountant and management consultant and ran a construction company. He died in 1985, at the age of 67, a few months after suffering a stroke.

A made-for-television film, Vanished, loosely based on the Jenkins resignation, aired in 1971.

The Tony-award winning play, All the Way, and its television film adaptation, about Lyndon Johnson's first year in office from the Kennedy assassination on November 22, 1963 until the 1964 election on November 3, both depict the 1964 scandal involving Jenkins. In the film adaptation, Jenkins is portrayed by Todd Weeks.

Canadian playwright Steven Elliott Jackson wrote a play that stages an imaginary meeting and one-night-stand between Jenkins and civil rights activist Bayard Rustin called The Seat Next to the King. Directed by Tanisha Taitt and starring Conor Ling as Jenkins, along with Kwaku Okyere as Rustin, the play won the award for Best New Play at the 2017 Toronto Fringe Festival.

== See also ==
- Lavender scare

== Works cited ==
- Beschloss, Michael, ed. (2001). Reaching for Glory: Lyndon Johnson's Secret White House Tapes, 1964-1965. Simon & Schuster. ISBN 978-0-684-80408-8.
- Dallek, Robert (1998). Flawed Giant: Lyndon Johnson and His Times, 1961-1973. Oxford University Press. ISBN 978-0-19-505465-1.
- Evans, Rowland; Novak, Robert D. (1966). Lyndon B. Johnson; the exercise of power; a political biography. New American Library. LCCN 66026040.
- Levine, Edward P. (1966). "Studying the American Press: The Walter Jenkins Case". Journalism Quarterly. 43 (3). SAGE Publications: 493–496. doi:10.1177/107769906604300311. ISSN 0022-5533 – via Wikipedia Library.
- Perlstein, Rick (2009). Before the Storm: Barry Goldwater and the Unmaking of the American Consensus. Nation Books. ISBN 978-1-56858-412-6.
- White, Theodore H. (1965). The Making of the President, 1964. Atheneum Publishers. LCCN 65018328.
- Updegrove, Mark K. (2012). Indomitable Will: LBJ in the Presidency. Crown Publishers. ISBN 978-0-307-88771-9.

Political offices
Preceded by Kenneth O'Donnell	White House Chief of Staff; De facto 1963–1964	Succeeded by Bill Moyers; De facto
