= Deer Creek, Texas =

Ghost town in Texas, US

- Ghost town
- Location in Texas
- Coordinates: 33.6365°N 98.2875°W
- Country: United States
- State: Texas
- County: Clay

Population (1940)
  - Total: 25

Deer Creek is a ghost town in Clay County, Texas, United States.

== History ==
Deer Creek is situated on Farm to Market Road 1883, and was named after a nearby creek. It was established shortly after 1900. In 1940, it had a population of 25.
