= Jolly, Texas =

- City
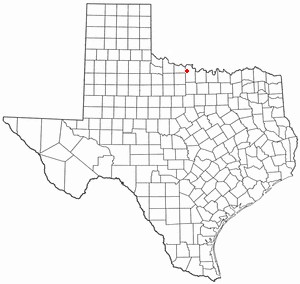
- Location of Jolly, Texas

- Coordinates: 33°52′27″N 98°20′55″W
- Country: United States
- State: Texas
- County: Clay
- Established: 1890

Area
  - Total: 0.98 sq mi (2.55 km^{2})
  - Land: 0.98 sq mi (2.55 km^{2})
  - Water: 0.0039 sq mi (0.01 km^{2})
- Elevation: 994 ft (303 m)

Population (2020)
  - Total: 172
  - Density: 175/sq mi (67.5/km^{2})
- Time zone: UTC-6 (Central (CST))
  - Summer (DST): UTC-5 (CDT)
- Shared Postal Code: 76305
- FIPS code: 48-37924
- GNIS feature ID: 2410147

Jolly is a city in Clay County, Texas, United States. It is part of the Wichita Falls, Texas Metropolitan Statistical Area. The population was 172 at both the 2020 census and 2010 census.

== Geography ==
According to the United States Census Bureau, the city has a total area of 1.0 square mile (2.6 km^{2}), all land.

== Demographics ==
Historical population
Census	Pop.	Note	%±
1980	174		—
1990	201		15.5%
2000	188		−6.5%
2010	172		−8.5%
2020	172		0.0%
U.S. Decennial Census

=== 2020 census ===
As of the 2020 census, Jolly had a population of 172. The median age was 52.6 years. 19.8% of residents were under the age of 18 and 28.5% of residents were 65 years of age or older. For every 100 females there were 107.2 males, and for every 100 females age 18 and over there were 106.0 males age 18 and over.

0.0% of residents lived in urban areas, while 100.0% lived in rural areas.

There were 69 households in Jolly, of which 30.4% had children under the age of 18 living in them. Of all households, 60.9% were married-couple households, 18.8% were households with a male householder and no spouse or partner present, and 14.5% were households with a female householder and no spouse or partner present. About 14.4% of all households were made up of individuals and 8.6% had someone living alone who was 65 years of age or older.

There were 75 housing units, of which 8.0% were vacant. The homeowner vacancy rate was 1.5% and the rental vacancy rate was 0.0%.

Racial composition as of the 2020 census
Race	Number	Percent
White	149	86.6%
Black or African American	1	0.6%
American Indian and Alaska Native	7	4.1%
Asian	0	0.0%
Native Hawaiian and Other Pacific Islander	0	0.0%
Some other race	2	1.2%
Two or more races	13	7.6%
Hispanic or Latino (of any race)	13	7.6%

=== 2000 census ===
As of the census of 2000, there were 188 people, 70 households, and 59 families residing in the city. The population density was 190.7 inhabitants per square mile (73.6/km^{2}). There were 73 housing units at an average density of 74.1 per square mile (28.6/km^{2}). The racial makeup of the city was 99.47% White, and 0.53% from two or more races.

There were 70 households, out of which 28.6% had children under the age of 18 living with them, 75.7% were married couples living together, 8.6% had a female householder with no husband present, and 14.3% were non-families. 12.9% of all households were made up of individuals, and 5.7% had someone living alone who was 65 years of age or older. The average household size was 2.69 and the average family size was 2.90.

In the city, the population was spread out, with 18.1% under the age of 18, 8.5% from 18 to 24, 27.7% from 25 to 44, 34.6% from 45 to 64, and 11.2% who were 65 years of age or older. The median age was 43 years. For every 100 females, there were 100.0 males. For every 100 females age 18 and over, there were 111.0 males.

The median income for a household in the city was $44,375, and the median income for a family was $49,375. Males had a median income of $29,375 versus $16,354 for females. The per capita income for the city was $20,467. None of the families and 1.7% of the population were living below the poverty line.

== Education ==
The City of Jolly is served by the Henrietta Independent School District.

== Notable person ==
- Walter Jenkins, administrative assistant to Lyndon B. Johnson
