= Byers, Texas =

City in Clay County, Texas, United States

- City
- Interactive map of Byers, Texas
- Coordinates: 34°04′11″N 98°11′28″W
- Country: United States
- State: Texas
- County: Clay

Area
  - Total: 1.02 sq mi (2.63 km^{2})
  - Land: 1.00 sq mi (2.58 km^{2})
  - Water: 0.023 sq mi (0.06 km^{2})
- Elevation: 1,011 ft (308 m)

Population (2020)
  - Total: 454
  - Density: 456/sq mi (176/km^{2})
- Time zone: UTC-6 (Central (CST))
  - Summer (DST): UTC-5 (CDT)
- ZIP code: 76357
- Area code: 940
- FIPS code: 48-11644
- GNIS feature ID: 2409951

Byers is a city in Clay County, Texas, United States. It is part of the Wichita Falls, Texas Metropolitan Statistical Area. The population was 454 at the 2020 census.

== Geography ==
Byers is located in northern Clay County along Texas State Highway 79. Wichita Falls is 22 miles (35 km) to the southwest, and Waurika, Oklahoma, is 14 miles (23 km) to the northeast.

According to the United States Census Bureau, Byers has a total area of 1.0 square mile (2.6 km^{2}), of which 0.02 square miles (0.06 km^{2}), or 2.14%, is water.

== Demographics ==
Historical population
Census	Pop.	Note	%±
1940	427		—
1950	542		26.9%
1960	497		−8.3%
1970	553		11.3%
1980	556		0.5%
1990	510		−8.3%
2000	517		1.4%
2010	496		−4.1%
2020	454		−8.5%
U.S. Decennial Census

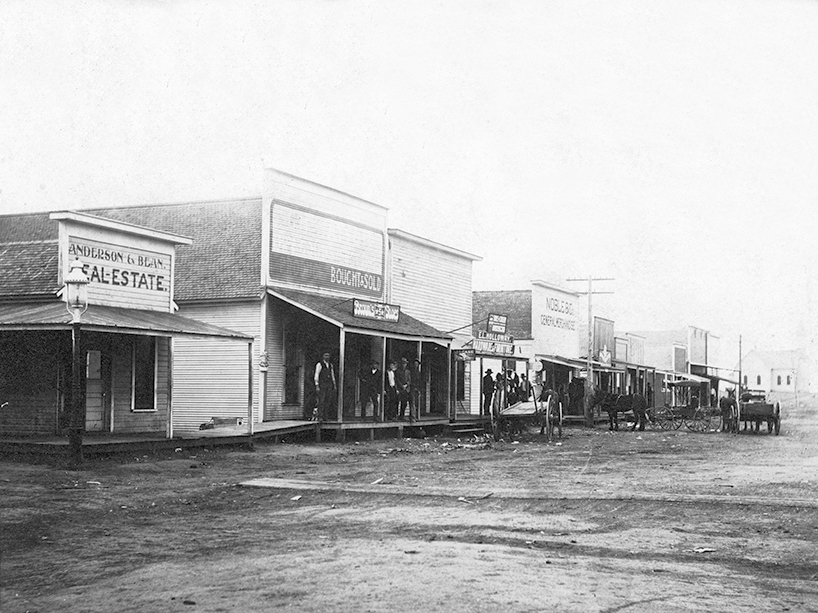
Byers, c. 1910

=== 2020 census ===
As of the 2020 census, Byers had a population of 454. The median age was 43.8 years, 23.3% of residents were under the age of 18, and 23.1% of residents were 65 years of age or older. For every 100 females there were 91.6 males, and for every 100 females age 18 and over there were 93.3 males age 18 and over.

There were 192 households in Byers, of which 32.8% had children under the age of 18 living in them. Of all households, 51.6% were married-couple households, 19.3% were households with a male householder and no spouse or partner present, and 20.8% were households with a female householder and no spouse or partner present. About 28.1% of all households were made up of individuals and 13.5% had someone living alone who was 65 years of age or older.

There were 225 housing units, of which 14.7% were vacant. Among occupied housing units, 81.3% were owner-occupied and 18.8% were renter-occupied. The homeowner vacancy rate was <0.1% and the rental vacancy rate was 10.0%.

0% of residents lived in urban areas, while 100.0% lived in rural areas.

Racial composition as of the 2020 census
Race	Percent
White	83.7%
Black or African American	0.2%
American Indian and Alaska Native	3.7%
Asian	0.7%
Native Hawaiian and Other Pacific Islander	0%
Some other race	1.5%
Two or more races	10.1%
Hispanic or Latino (of any race)	8.6%

=== 2000 census ===
As of the 2000 census, there were 517 people, 213 households, and 148 families residing in the city. The population density was 528.6 inhabitants per square mile (204.1/km^{2}). There were 229 housing units at an average density of 234.2 per square mile (90.4/km^{2}). The racial makeup of the city was 93.81% White, 3.48% Native American, 1.74% from other races, and 0.97% from two or more races. Hispanic or Latino of any race were 2.51% of the population.

There were 213 households, out of which 29.1% had children under the age of 18 living with them, 62.0% were married couples living together, 5.2% had a female householder with no husband present, and 30.5% were non-families. 27.2% of all households were made up of individuals, and 16.0% had someone living alone who was 65 years of age or older. The average household size was 2.43 and the average family size was 2.97.

In the city, the population was spread out, with 21.7% under the age of 18, 8.3% from 18 to 24, 24.6% from 25 to 44, 27.7% from 45 to 64, and 17.8% who were 65 years of age or older. The median age was 42 years. For every 100 females, there were 88.7 males. For every 100 females age 18 and over, there were 92.9 males.

The median income for a household in the city was $39,886, and the median income for a family was $41,563. Males had a median income of $26,161 versus $18,854 for females. The per capita income for the city was $16,323. About 7.5% of families and 9.1% of the population were below the poverty line, including 6.6% of those under age 18 and 13.7% of those age 65 or over.

== Education ==
Byers is served by the Petrolia Independent School District, including Petrolia High School.

The Byers Independent School District previously served students until its merger with Petrolia as approved by the voters in May 2012.

== See also ==
- List of municipalities in Texas
