= Texas State Highway 148 =

State highway in Texas

State Highway 148
- SH 148 highlighted in red

Route information
- Maintained by TxDOT
- Length: 55.15 mi (88.76 km)
- Existed: 1930–present

Major junctions
- South end: US 281 / SH 114 at Jacksboro
- US 287 at Henrietta; US 82 at Henrietta
- North end: SH 79 at Petrolia

Location
- Country: United States
- State: Texas

Highway system
- Highways in Texas; Interstate; US; State; Former; Toll; Loops; Spurs; FM/RM; Park; Rec
← SH 147	→ SH 149

State Highway 148 (SH 148) is a north–south state highway that runs from US 281 in Jacksboro through Henrietta to SH 79 in Petrolia.

== Route description ==
SH 148 is a two-lane improved surface highway that connects the various farming and economic centers of Jack and Clay Counties. Almost all of the route is rural and traffic is rarely a concern anywhere along the route. In Henrietta, the route parallels US 82 approximately 1.4 miles (2.3 km) west and then splits north toward Petrolia.

== History ==
SH 148 was originally designated on March 19, 1930, along a route from the Red River northwest of Petrolia via Henrietta to Antelope as a renumbering of SH 25A. On October 26, 1932, the section south of Henrietta was cancelled. The route was extended to Jacksboro on November 18, 1938. On August 1, 1941, the section of SH 148 north of Charlie was cancelled and obliterated, as the bridge was destroyed due to flooding. The section north of Petrolia was transferred to FM 810 on August 24, 1948. In 1974, Highway 148 became nationally significant due to its appearance in the movie The Texas Chain Saw Massacre.

== Major intersections ==
County	Location	mi	km	Destinations	Notes
Jack	Jacksboro			US 281 / SH 114	Southern terminus
Jack				FM 2190	
Jack				FM 2127	
Clay				FM 175	
Clay				FM 174	
Clay				FM 173	
Clay				FM 1883	
Clay				FM 172	
Clay	Henrietta			FM 2847	
Clay	Henrietta			US 287	
Clay	Henrietta			US 82	
Clay	Petrolia			FM 2332	
Clay	Petrolia			SH 79 / FM 810	Northern terminus
1.000 mi = 1.609 km; 1.000 km = 0.621 mi
