= Petrolia, Texas =

- City
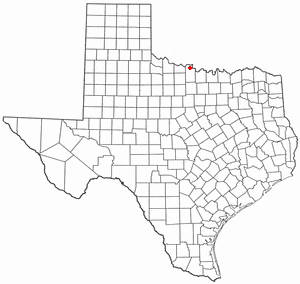
- Location of Petrolia, Texas

- Coordinates: 34°0′47″N 98°13′52″W
- Country: United States
- State: Texas
- County: Clay

Area
  - Total: 0.74 sq mi (1.92 km^{2})
  - Land: 0.74 sq mi (1.91 km^{2})
  - Water: 0.0039 sq mi (0.01 km^{2})
- Elevation: 994 ft (303 m)

Population (2020)
  - Total: 514
  - Density: 697/sq mi (269/km^{2})
- Time zone: UTC-6 (Central (CST))
  - Summer (DST): UTC-5 (CDT)
- ZIP code: 76377
- Area code: 940
- FIPS code: 48-57044
- GNIS feature ID: 2411409

Petrolia is a city in Clay County, Texas, United States. It is part of the Wichita Falls, Texas, metropolitan statistical area. Its population was 514 at the 2020 census, down from 686 at the 2010 census.

== Geography ==
Petrolia is located in northern Clay County. Texas State Highway 79 passes through the center of town, leading southwest 17 miles (27 km) to Wichita Falls and northeast 18 miles (29 km) to Waurika, Oklahoma. Texas State Highway 148 leads south from the center of Petrolia 14 miles (23 km) to Henrietta, the Clay County seat.

According to the United States Census Bureau, Petrolia has a total area of 0.73 square miles (1.9 km^{2}), all land.

== Demographics ==
Historical population
Census	Pop.	Note	%±
1910	517		—
1920	914		76.8%
1930	806		−11.8%
1940	597		−25.9%
1950	606		1.5%
1960	631		4.1%
1970	584		−7.4%
1980	755		29.3%
1990	762		0.9%
2000	782		2.6%
2010	686		−12.3%
2020	514		−25.1%
U.S. Decennial Census; 2020 Census

As of the 2020 census, Petrolia had a population of 514.

=== Racial and ethnic composition ===
Racial composition as of the 2020 census
Race	Number	Percent
White	432	84.0%
Black or African American	3	0.6%
American Indian and Alaska Native	2	0.4%
Asian	1	0.2%
Native Hawaiian and Other Pacific Islander	0	0.0%
Some other race	13	2.5%
Two or more races	63	12.3%
Hispanic or Latino (of any race)	39	7.6%

=== 2020 census ===
The median age was 41.3 years, with 23.2% of residents under 18 and 18.5% 65 or older. For every 100 females there were 83.6 males, and for every 100 females age 18 and over there were 83.7 males age 18 and over.

0.0% of residents lived in urban areas, while 100.0% lived in rural areas.

There were 218 households in Petrolia, of which 27.1% had children under the age of 18 living in them. Of all households, 40.8% were married-couple households, 20.6% were households with a male householder and no spouse or partner present, and 28.4% were households with a female householder and no spouse or partner present. About 27.5% of all households were made up of individuals and 16.9% had someone living alone who was 65 years of age or older.

There were 268 housing units, of which 18.7% were vacant. The homeowner vacancy rate was 5.2% and the rental vacancy rate was 10.0%.

=== 2000 census ===
As of the census of 2000, 782 people, 305 households, and 215 families resided in the city. The population density was 1,051.1 inhabitants per square mile (405.8/km^{2}). The 338 housing units had an average density of 454.3 per square mile (175.4/km^{2}). The racial makeup of the city was 94.88% White, 0.77% African American, 1.41% Native American, 1.15% from other races, and 1.79% from two or more races. Hispanics or Latinos of any race were 3.96% of the population.

Of the 305 households, 32.1% had children under 18 living with them, 53.8% were married couples living together, 13.1% had a female householder with no husband present, and 29.2% were not families. About 26.6% of all households were made up of individuals, and 13.8% had someone living alone who was 65 or older. The average household size was 2.56 and the average family size was 3.07.

In the city, the age distribution was 26.9% under 18, 9.5% from 18 to 24, 26.9% from 25 to 44, 22.1% from 45 to 64, and 14.7% who were or older. The median age was 36 years. For every 100 females, there were 77.7 males. For every 100 females 18 and over, there were 78.2 males.

The median income for a household in the city was $27,386 and for a family was $31,250. Males had a median income of $26,136 versus $16,731 for females. The per capita income for the city was $12,825. About 16.6% of families and 17.6% of the population were below the poverty line, including 20.2% of those under 18 and 20.5% of those 65 or over.

== Notable people ==
- Reed Hadley, actor on Racket Squad and The Public Defender, was born in Petrolia in 1911.
- David Nelson, NFL football player for the New York Jets

== Education ==
The city is served by the Petrolia Independent School District and is home to the Petrolia High School Pirates.
