= Byers Independent School District =

Former school district in Texas

Byers Independent School District was a public school district based in Byers, Texas (USA).

In May 2012, the district's voters and those of the neighboring Petrolia Independent School District voted to consolidate the two districts, with Petrolia remaining the surviving district after the merger. The merger took effect May 25, 2012.
