= Halsell, Texas =

Unincorporated community in Texas, US

Coordinates: 33°43′10″N 98°20′41″W

Halsell was an unincorporated community located 10 miles southwest of Henrietta in west central Clay County, Texas, United States. It was submerged during the creation of Lake Arrowhead.

== History ==
Established in about 1900 and named for local rancher Harry Halsell, the town of Halsell received a post office in 1901. The town remained a small, obscure ranching community until the Southwestern Railway Company established a rail line connecting Henrietta and Archer City in 1910. It became a stop on the line and for almost a decade the small town flourished, reaching a population of 600 by 1920. The rail line, however, was short-lived and the reduction of passenger travel forced the line into bankruptcy by 1921, spelling the end of Halsell's growth. The town's post office closed in 1919. Oil was discovered in the area in the 1930s, which had little to no effect on the small community. When Lake Arrowhead was built in 1965, residents of Halsell were forced to move, as the townsite would be under the new lake. Even the "residents" of the Halsell cemetery were moved to other graves in the county. Today, Halsell is still shown on some maps on the eastern shores of Lake Arrowhead.
