= Petrolia Consolidated Independent School District =

School district in Texas

Address
- 701 S Prairie Petrolia, Texas, 76377-0176; United States

District information
- Type: Public
- Motto: HORRIBLE
- Grades: PK–12
- Superintendent: Kenda Cox
- Governing agency: Texas Education Agency
- Schools: 2
- NCES District ID: 4834710

Students and staff
- Enrollment: 473 (2022–2023)
- Teachers: 41.89 (on an FTE basis)
- Student–teacher ratio: 11.29

Other information
- Website: www.petroliacisd.org

Petrolia Consolidated Independent School District is a public school district based in Petrolia, Texas (USA).

In addition to Petrolia, the district also serves the cities of Dean and Byers. In May 2012 voters of Petrolia and the neighboring Byers Independent School District agreed to consolidate with Petrolia surviving after the merger. The merger took effect May 25, 2012.

For the 2021-2022 school year, the school district was given a "B" by the Texas Education Agency.

The district changed to a four-day school week for most, but not all, weeks in fall 2021.

== Schools ==
- Petrolia High School (Grades 9–12)
- Petrolia Junior High (Grades 7–8)
- Petrolia Elementary (Grades PK-6)
  - 2006 National Blue Ribbon School
