= Bellevue Independent School District =

School district in Texas, United States

Location
- Bellevue, Texas ESC Region 9 USA
- Coordinates: 33°37′51″N 98°0′58″W

District information
- Type: Independent school district
- Grades: K through 12
- Superintendent: Wade Wesley
- Schools: 1 (2022-23)
- NCES District ID: 4809750

Students and staff
- Students: 167 (2022-23)
- Teachers: 16.10 (2022-23) (on full-time equivalent (FTE) basis)
- Student–teacher ratio: 10.37 (2022-23)
- Athletic conference: UIL Class 1A Basketball Division II
- District mascot: Eagles
- Colors: Black, Gold

Other information
- TEA District Accountability Rating for 2011: Academically Acceptable
- Website: Bellevue ISD

Bellevue Independent School District is a public school district based in Bellevue, Texas (USA).

== Finances ==
As of the 2010–2011 school year, the appraised valuation of property in the district was $48,481,000. The maintenance tax rate was $0.117 and the bond tax rate was $0.000 per $100 of appraised valuation.

== Academic achievement ==
In 2011, the school district was rated "academically acceptable" by the Texas Education Agency.

In 2019, the Texas Education Agency gave Bellevue ISD an overall score of 81, giving it a "B". Bellvue ISD was rated in three categories:

- Student Achievement: An average rating of 84 out of 100
- School Progress: An average rating of 84 out of 100
- Closing the Gaps: A rating of 75 out of 100

For the 2021-2022 school year, the Texas Education Agency gave Bellvue ISD an overall score of 75, giving it a "C". Bellevue ISD was rated in three categories:

- Student Achievement: An average rating of 77 out of 100
- School Progress: An average rating of 73 out of 100
- Closing the Gaps: A rating of 71 out of 100

== Schools ==
In the 2022–2023 school year, the district had one open school.

- Bellevue School (Grades K-12) 33°37′51″N 98°0′56″W

== Sports ==
Jacob Eckeberger (All District 1st team) Terrance Perry (Defensive MVP) Tyler Allen (All District 1st team)

== Academic Achievements ==
Jacob Eckeberger (State Number Sense) Tyler Allen (State Number Sense)

== See also ==
- List of school districts in Texas
- 2019 Accountability Rating
