= Henrietta Independent School District =

School district in Texas

Address
- 1801 E Crafton Henrietta, Texas, 76365-2414; United States

District information
- Type: Public
- Grades: PK–12
- Superintendent: Jaime Clark
- Governing agency: Texas Education Agency
- Schools: 3
- NCES District ID: 4822980

Students and staff
- Enrollment: 994 (2022–2023)
- Teachers: 87.34 (on an FTE basis)
- Student–teacher ratio: 11.38

Other information
- Website: www.henrietta-isd.net

Henrietta Independent School District is a public school district based in Henrietta, Texas (USA).

In addition to Henrietta, the district serves the city of Jolly as well as rural areas in central Clay County.

For the 2021-2022 school year, the school was given a "B" by the Texas Education Agency.

== Schools ==
- Henrietta High School (Grades 9-12)
- Henrietta Middle School (Grades 6-8)
- Henrietta Elementary School (Grades PK-5)
