= Bellevue, Texas =

- City
- Interactive map of Bellevue, Texas
- Coordinates: 33°38′01″N 98°00′59″W
- Country: United States
- State: Texas
- County: Clay

Area
  - Total: 0.84 sq mi (2.18 km^{2})
  - Land: 0.84 sq mi (2.18 km^{2})
  - Water: 0 sq mi (0.00 km^{2})
- Elevation: 1,024 ft (312 m)

Population (2020)
  - Total: 289
  - Density: 343/sq mi (133/km^{2})
- Time zone: UTC-6 (Central (CST))
  - Summer (DST): UTC-5 (CDT)
- ZIP code: 76228
- Area code: 940
- FIPS code: 48-07396
- GNIS feature ID: 2409820

Bellevue is a city in Clay County, Texas, United States. It is part of the Wichita Falls metropolitan statistical area. The population was 289 at the 2020 census.

== History ==
The sparsely settled area developed around 1882 by the Ortons, when it was selected as a railroad shipping station. The community has had several declines and resurges. In 1902, the community incorporated, but then it was almost wiped out by a tornado in 1906. Now it is a small growing town.

== Geography ==
Bellevue is located in southeastern Clay County at 33°38′7″N 98°0′56″W (33.635221, –98.015609).

According to the United States Census Bureau, the city has a total area of 0.84 square miles (2.18 km^{2}), all land.

Bellevue is located on U.S. Route 287, 78 miles (126 km) northwest of Fort Worth and 36 miles (58 km) southeast of Wichita Falls.

== Demographics ==
Historical population
Census	Pop.	Note	%±
1910	699		—
1920	782		11.9%
1930	546		−30.2%
1940	503		−7.9%
1950	418		−16.9%
1960	309		−26.1%
1970	323		4.5%
1980	352		9.0%
1990	333		−5.4%
2000	386		15.9%
2010	362		−6.2%
2020	289		−20.2%
U.S. Decennial Census; 2020 Census

=== 2020 census ===
As of the 2020 census, Bellevue had a population of 289. The median age was 41.1 years. 20.8% of residents were under the age of 18, and 19.7% of residents were 65 years of age or older. For every 100 females there were 110.9 males, and for every 100 females age 18 and over there were 100.9 males age 18 and over.

0% of residents lived in urban areas, while 100.0% lived in rural areas.

There were 104 households in Bellevue, of which 40.4% had children under the age of 18 living in them. Of all households, 68.3% were married-couple households, 10.6% were households with a male householder and no spouse or partner present, and 17.3% were households with a female householder and no spouse or partner present. About 21.1% of all households were made up of individuals and 10.5% had someone living alone who was 65 years of age or older.

There were 138 housing units, of which 24.6% were vacant. Among occupied housing units, 81.7% were owner-occupied and 18.3% were renter-occupied. The homeowner vacancy rate was <0.1% and the rental vacancy rate was 5.0%.

Racial composition as of the 2020 census
Race	Percent
White	93.1%
Black or African American	0.7%
American Indian and Alaska Native	1.0%
Asian	0.3%
Native Hawaiian and Other Pacific Islander	0%
Some other race	0.3%
Two or more races	4.5%
Hispanic or Latino (of any race)	1.4%

=== 2010 census ===
As of the 2010 census, there were 362 people, 140 households, and 105 families residing in the city. The population density was 430.1 inhabitants per square mile (166.1/km^{2}). There were 161 housing units at an average density of 191.3 per square mile (73.9/km^{2}). The racial makeup of the city was 97.24% White, 0.55% African American, 0.83% Native American, 0.83% from other races, and 0.55% from two or more races. Hispanic or Latino of any race were 1.93% of the population.

There were 140 households, out of which 35.0% had children under the age of 18 living with them, 57.1% were married couples living together, 11.4% had a female householder with no husband present, 6.4% had a male householder with no wife present, and 25.0% were non-families. 21.4% of all households were made up of individuals, and 12.1% had someone living alone who was 65 years of age or older. The average household size was 2.59 and the average family size was 2.94.

In the city, the population was spread out, with 24.6% under the age of 18, 5.2% from 18 to 24, 24.9% from 25 to 44, 28.5% from 45 to 64, and 16.9% who were 65 years of age or older. The median age was 44.4 years. For every 100 females, there were 102.2 males. For every 100 females age 18 and over, there were 93.6 males.

The median income for a household in the city was $32,813, and the median income for a family was $46,250. Males had a median income of $51,000 versus $50,000 for females. The per capita income for the city was $21,645. About 17.7% of families and 20.7% of the population were below the poverty line, including 28.6% of those under age 18 and 24.5% of those age 65 or over.

== Education ==
Bellevue is served by the Bellevue Independent School District.

== Climate ==
The climate in this area is characterized by hot, humid summers and generally mild to cool winters. According to the Köppen Climate Classification system, Bellevue has a humid subtropical climate, abbreviated "Cfa" on climate maps.
