= Midway Independent School District (Clay County, Texas) =

School district in Texas

Coordinates: 33.6282°N 98.2001°W

Location
- southern Clay County, TX ESC Region 9 USA

District information
- Type: Public
- Grades: Pre-K through 12
- Established: 1941
- Superintendent: Alan Umholtz

Students and staff
- Athletic conference: UIL Class A - Division II (non-football member)
- Colors: red and white

Other information
- Mascot: Falcon
- Website: www.midwayisd.net

Midway Independent School District is a public school district in Texas (USA). The district is located in southern Clay County and extends into a small portion of northern Jack County.

Midway ISD has one school that serves students in grades Pre-K though twelve.

In 2009, the school district was rated "academically acceptable" by the Texas Education Agency.

== History ==
The school was created in 1941 when the surrounding communities consolidated to form the Midway Independent School District. Due to World War II construction of Midway I.S.D. was not completed until 1947, so students were bussed to Bluegrove which served as Midway until the new building opened. School buildings from the other communities were moved to Bluegrove to house the consolidated students. The school is called Midway because it is located "midway" between Bluegrove to the north and Joy to the south. It was originally to be built on land donated by J.T. Lyles on the Old Joy Shannon Road about a mile to the West of the school's current location. Old Joy Shannon Road is a gravel road that runs from Shannon, north to Joy, passing about a mile east of Bluegrove, and then used to connect with the road to Henrietta, but before construction started on the school, the state began building Texas Highway 148 from Henrietta south to Jacksboro. J.T. Lyles instead donated land next to the paved highway, giving Midway its present location, and making travel to and from the school much easier.

== Academic and Athletic Championships ==
NOTE: Class B was renamed Class A in 1976.

- Boys basketball, 1959 Class B
- Girls basketball, 1961 Class B
- Overall academic, 1978 Class A
- Overall academic, 1998 Class A
- Notable Academic Achievement: Sam Keen (1998), Record-holder, Most State Championships (Class A) in University Interscholastic League (UIL) Individual Category [Mathematics, Science, Number Sense, Mathematics] 9 (Source, University Interscholastic League. Austin, TX 2010)
