= Henrietta, Texas =

Henrietta
- City
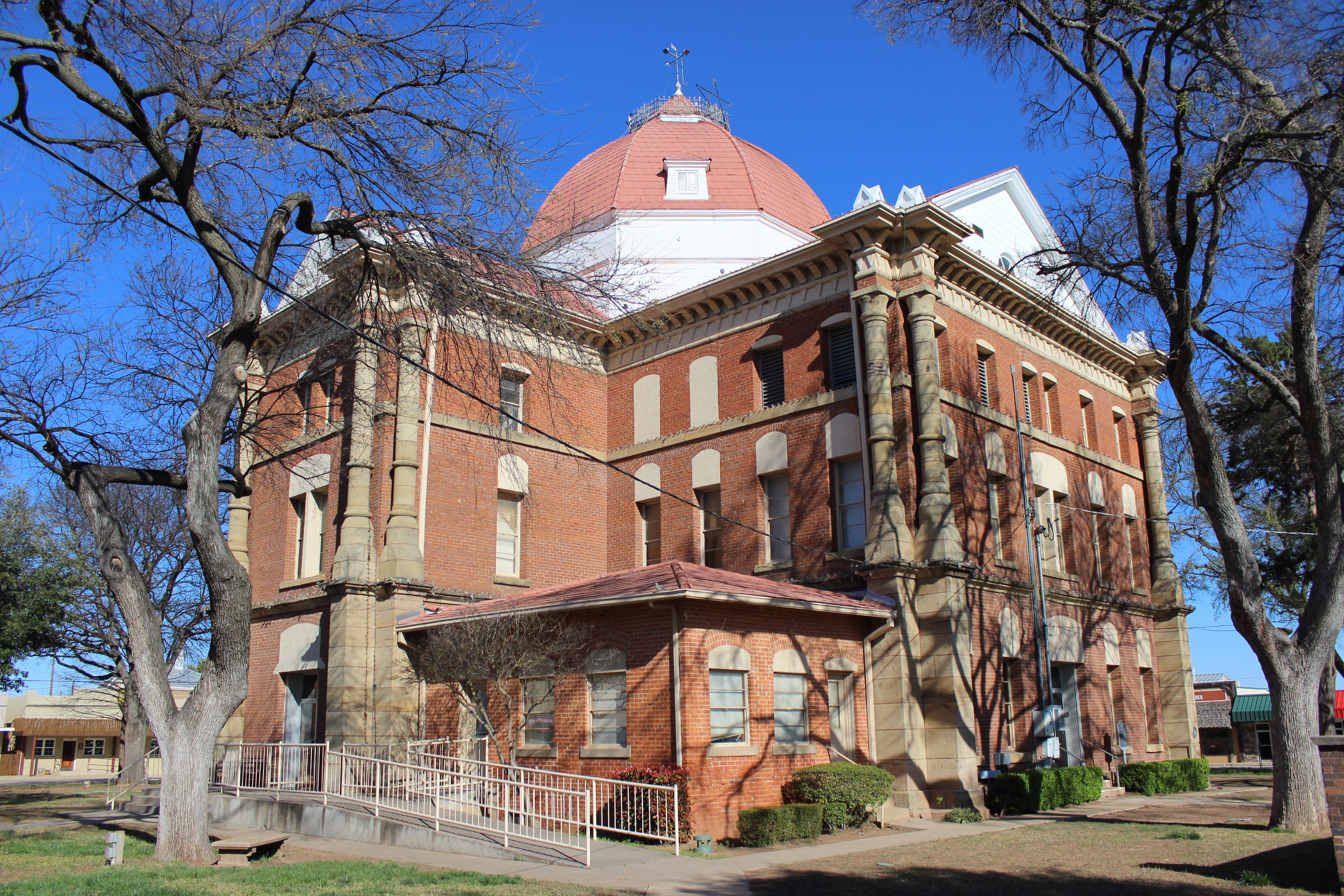
- Clay County Courthouse

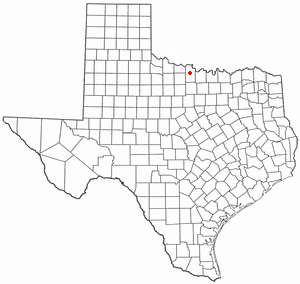
- Location of Henrietta, Texas

- Coordinates: 33°48′53″N 98°11′33″W
- Country: United States
- State: Texas
- County: Clay

Area
  - Total: 5.21 sq mi (13.49 km^{2})
  - Land: 5.10 sq mi (13.22 km^{2})
  - Water: 0.10 sq mi (0.26 km^{2})
- Elevation: 915 ft (279 m)

Population (2020)
  - Total: 3,111
  - Density: 609.4/sq mi (235.29/km^{2})
- Time zone: UTC-6 (Central (CST))
  - Summer (DST): UTC-5 (CDT)
- ZIP code: 76365
- Area code: 940
- FIPS code: 48-33284
- GNIS feature ID: 2410743
- Website: www.cityofhenrietta.com

Henrietta is a city in and the county seat of Clay County, Texas, United States. It is part of the Wichita Falls metropolitan statistical area. The population was 3,111 at the 2020 census, a decline of 30 from the 2010 tabulation of 3,141.

== History ==
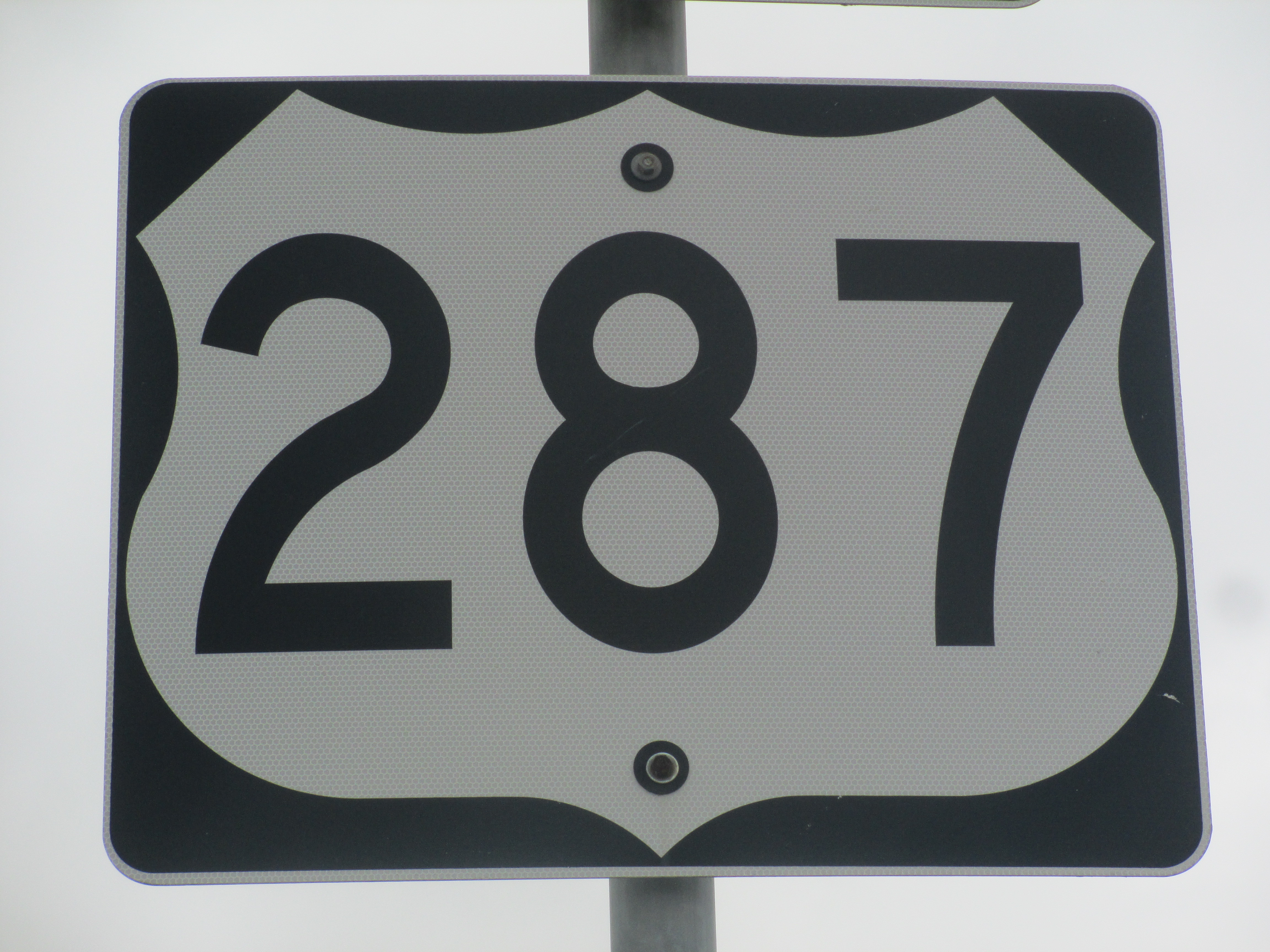
U.S. Route 287 has long been a key traffic artery in Henrietta.

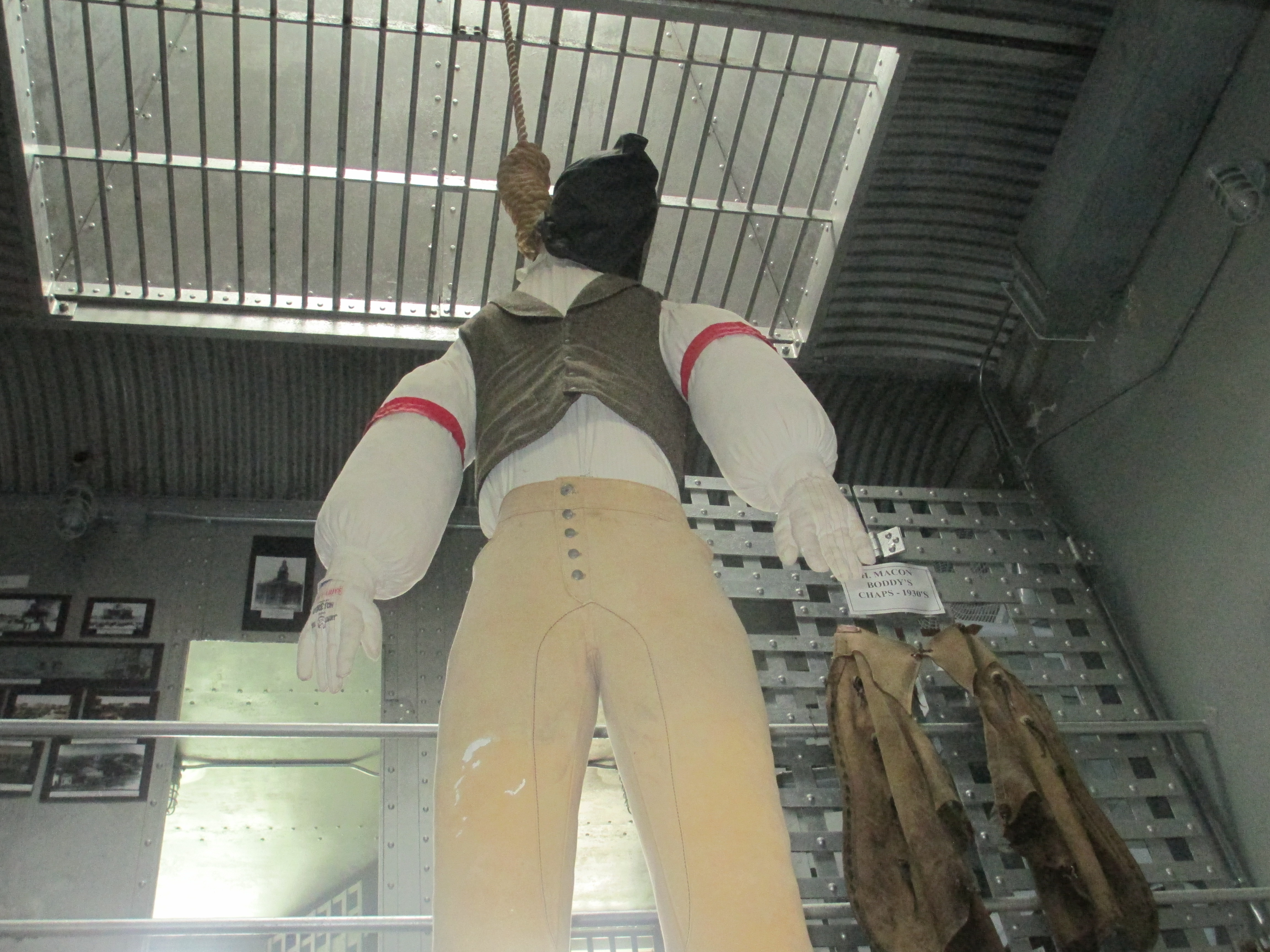
Hanging exhibit at the Clay County 1890 Jail Museum in Henrietta, though no executions were conducted at the old jail.

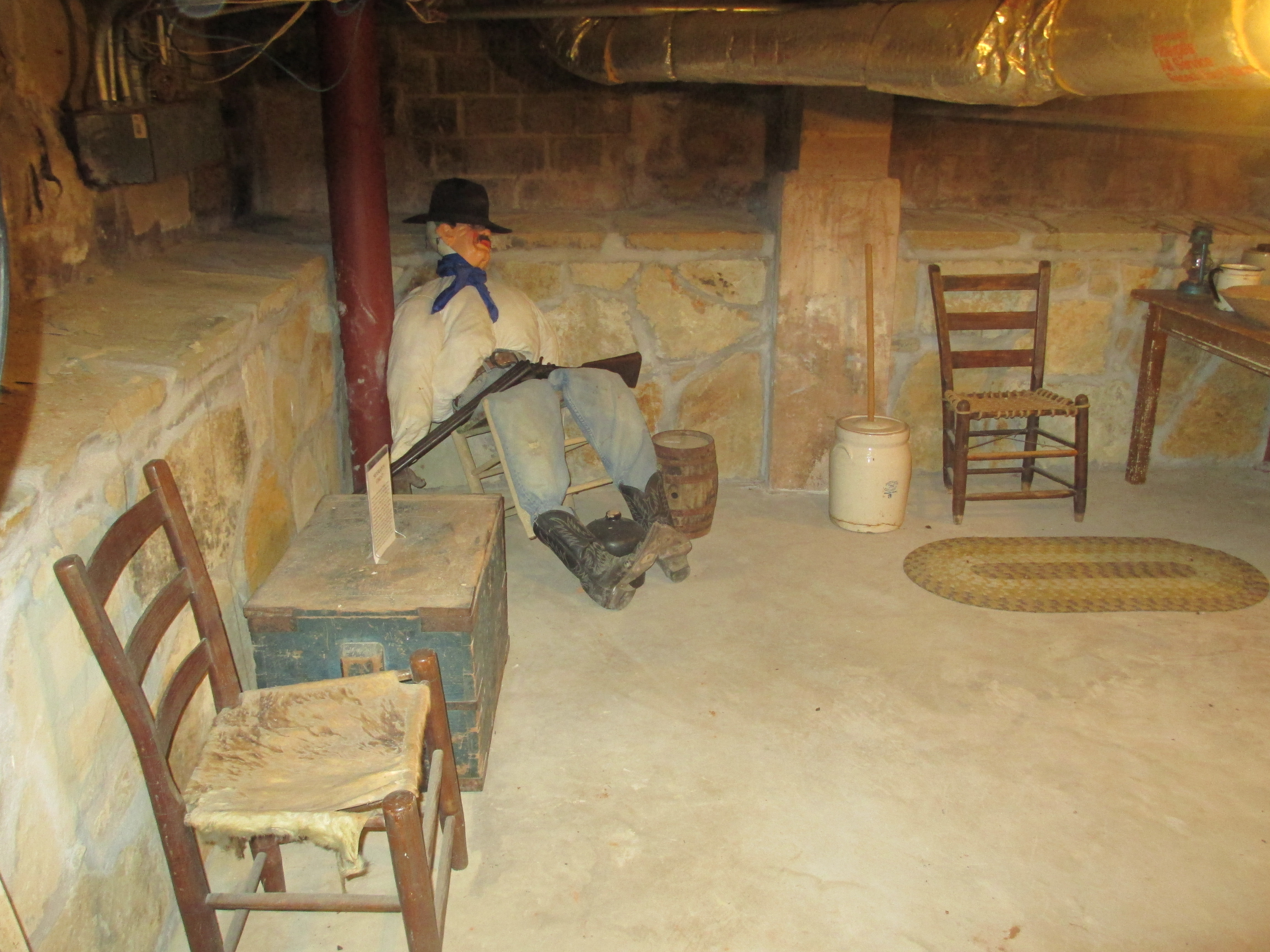
Sleeping guard exhibit at Clay County 1890 Jail Museum

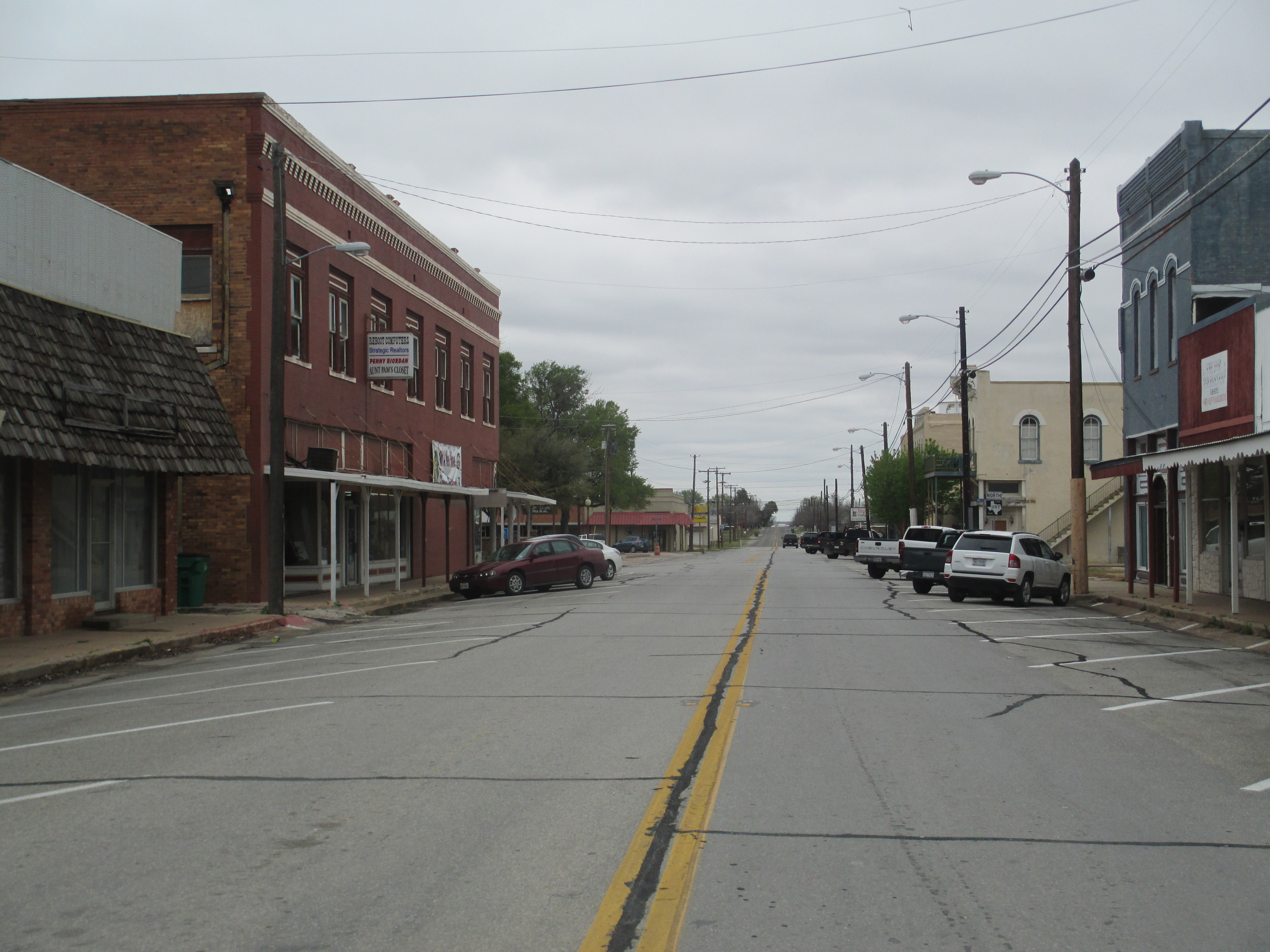
A portion of Henrietta

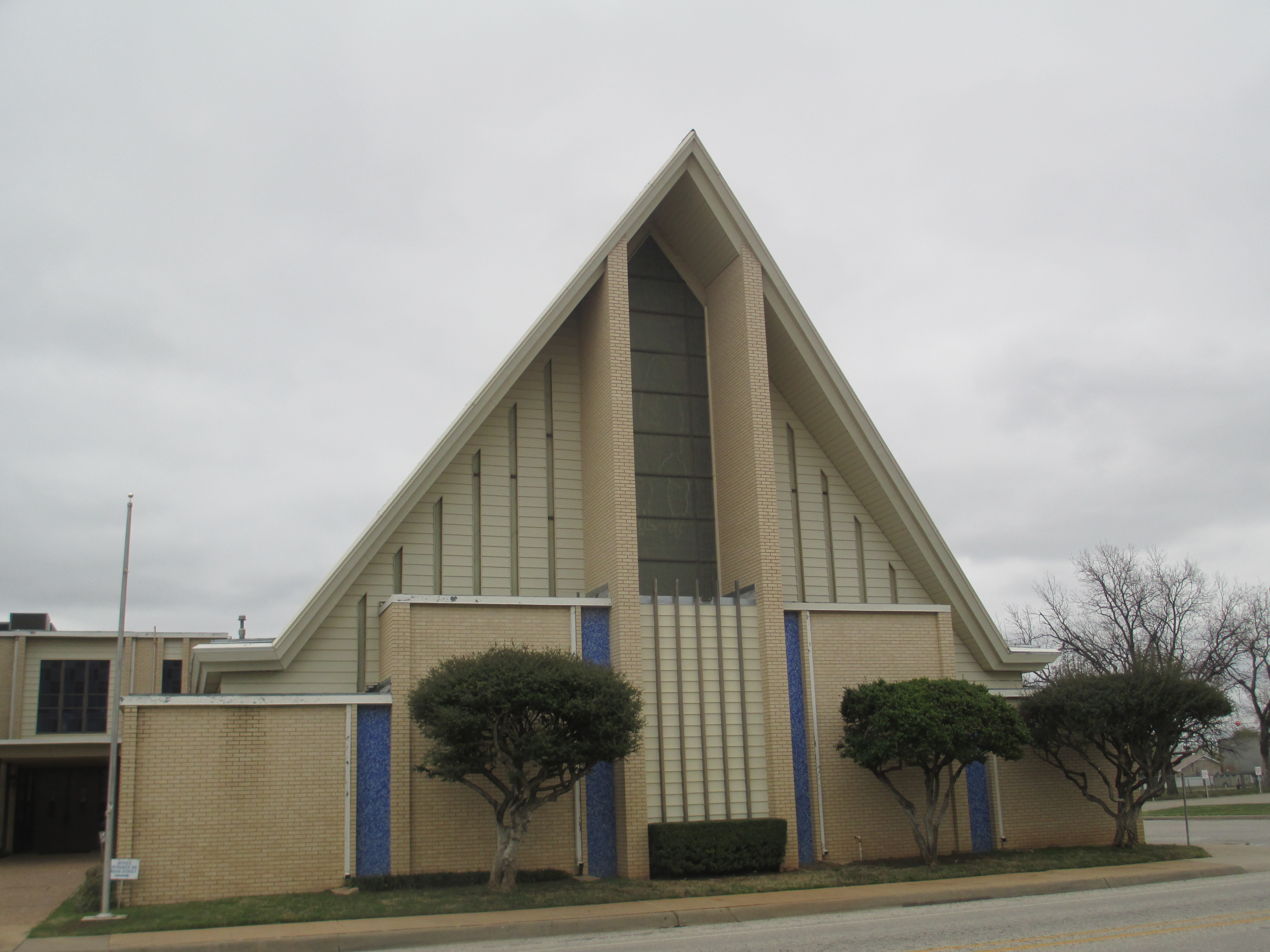
The First Baptist Church at 208 S. Graham Street in Henrietta was originally established in 1876. In 2013, the church had more than 1,300 members.

Henrietta is one of the oldest settled towns in north central Texas. It sits at the crossroads of U.S. Highway 287, U.S. Highway 82, State Highway 148, and Farm to Market Road 1197 in north central Clay County.

Clay and Montague counties were separated in 1857 from Cooke County to the east, and Henrietta was named as the county seat. The etymology of the town remains a mystery, though several explanations have been offered. Regardless of the origin of its name, Henrietta became the center of gravity for the fledgling county. In 1860, as the only town in the county, it had 109 residents, 10 houses, and a general store. It sat at the far western edge of Anglo expansion in north-central Texas, but Native Americans remained a viable threat to current and future settlers. In 1862, Henrietta opened its post office. In the early 1860s, there were continuous attacks from local tribes. By late 1862, Henrietta was abandoned, and white settlers returned east to Cooke and Montague counties. Remaining structures were burned. Anglos continued to attempt resettlement, and in 1865 after the Civil War, a group attempting resettlement was massacred. A number of Quakers attempted to reoccupy the former townsite, but its members were either killed or fled. In 1870, fifty soldiers and Kiowa Indians fought a battle in the ruins of Henrietta.

After the battle, white settlers returned to Henrietta, this time permanently. In 1874, the post office reopened, and Henrietta quickly became the economic hub of north-central Texas. In 1882, the Fort Worth and Denver Railway reached Henrietta on its southern side, and in 1887, Henrietta became the westernmost terminus for the Gainesville, Henrietta, and Western Railway.

In 1895, the Wichita Falls Railway, one of the properties of Joseph A. Kemp and Frank Kell, linked Henrietta with Wichita Falls; sold in 1911, this 18-mile (29 km) segment was operated thereafter by the Missouri-Kansas-Texas Railroad, known as the Katy. This particular track was abandoned in 1970. MK&T then built in Wichita Falls a station, offices, a roundhouse, and three switching tracks.

After heavy lobbying by businessmen, Henrietta became a logistical supply point for various operations in north-central Texas, including mining in Foard and Archer counties. The Southwestern Railway Company in 1910 completed a rail linking Henrietta with Archer City.

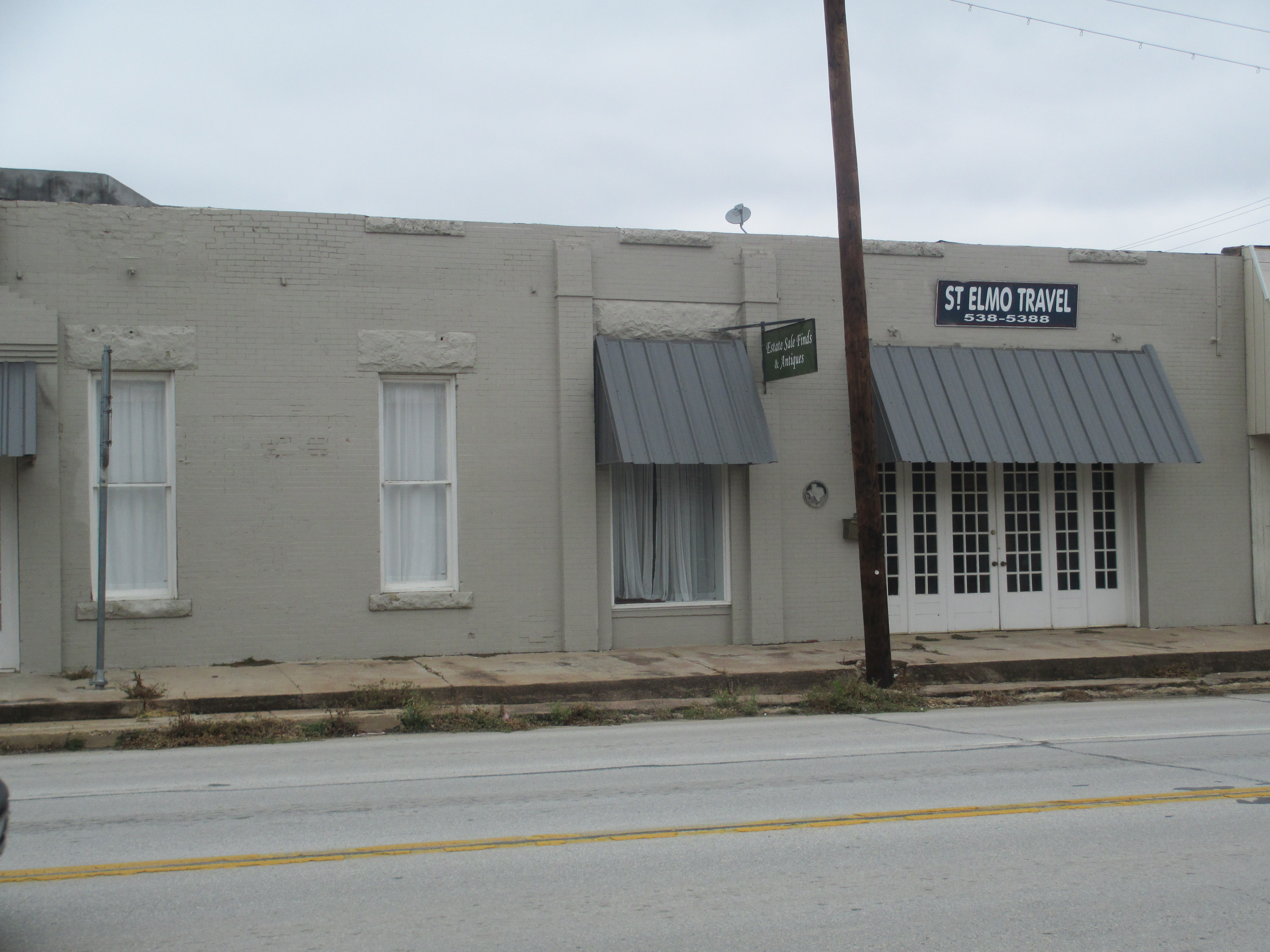
An antiques shop occupies part of the building which once housed the St. Elmo Hotel, long ago destroyed in a fire.

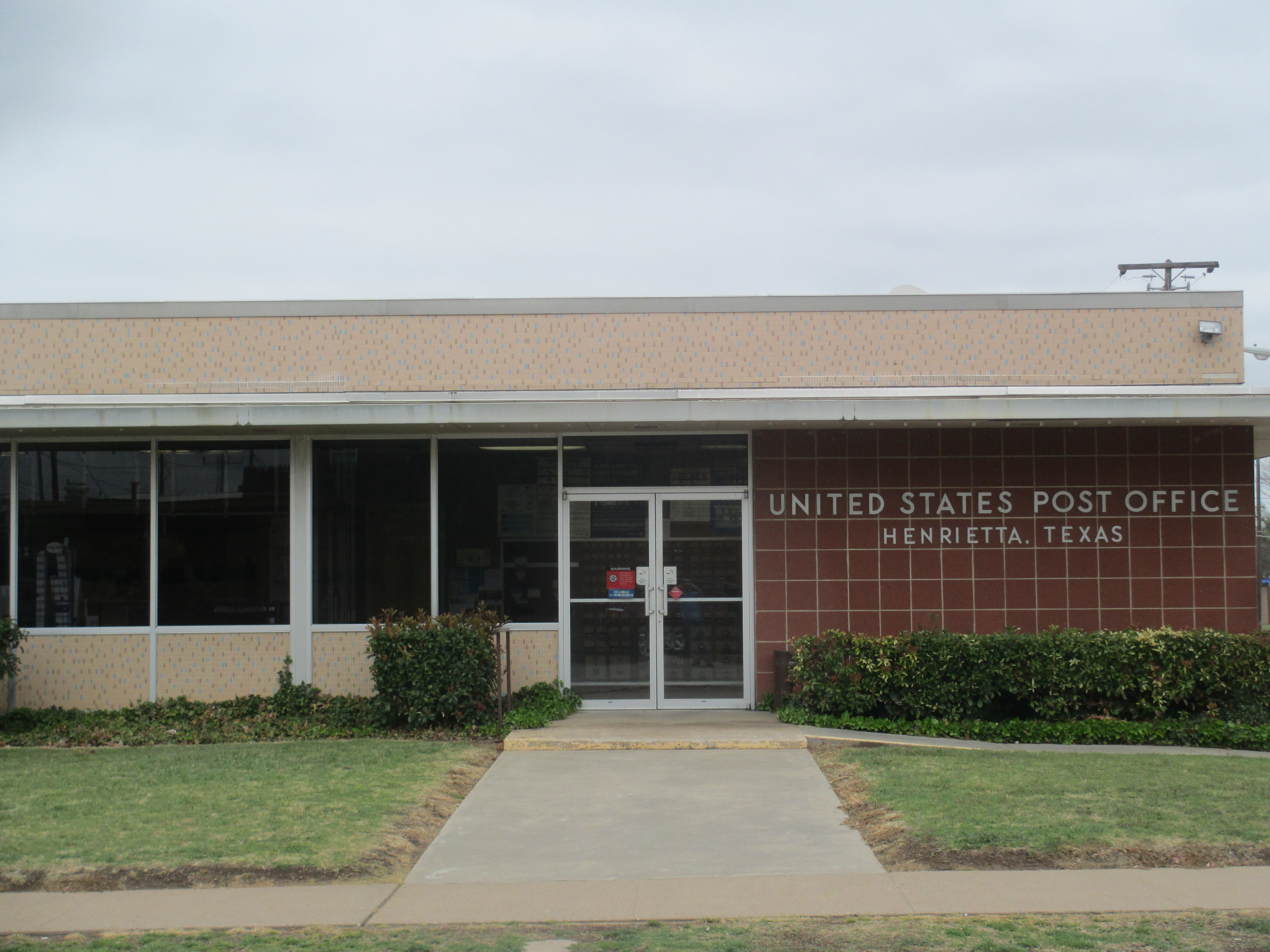
The U.S. Post Office is located in the southeastern corner of Courthouse Square in Henrietta.

Though it had been settled earlier, Henrietta did not incorporate until 1881. The Clay County courthouse was built in 1884 and is still in use. By 1890, the population had reached 2,100, and the town boasted a 400-seat opera house, five churches, a new jailhouse, and a school. From 1893 to 1895, it had a college—Henrietta Normal College—for the training of teachers. It remained the economic hub of the county at the turn of the 20th century.

The St. Elmo Hotel, established about 1895 in Henrietta, had among its guests Quanah Parker, who married two of his wives there, and U.S. President Theodore Roosevelt, when he toured the North Texas area. When the top floors of the hotel burned, the facility closed and never reopened. A portion of the lower floor now houses an antiques store.

The growth of Henrietta waned in the 20th century as Wichita Falls grew rapidly into the most prosperous economic center in the area. The Southwestern Railway line was abandoned in 1920, and the Gainesville, Henrietta, and Western Railway line closed in 1969. By 1990, the population remained under 3,000. In 2000, it topped 3,000 for the first time since the 1970 census. In many ways, Henrietta is a "bedroom community" for Wichita Falls but is still the largest city in Clay County.

The play Texas presented during summers at the Palo Duro Canyon near Amarillo is loosely based on the history of Henrietta.

The 1995 film, The Stars Fell on Henrietta, produced by Clint Eastwood and David Valdez, and starring Robert Duvall, Brian Dennehy and Billy Bob Thornton, depicts the Texas oil rush of the 1930s and is set in Henrietta.

== Geography ==
Henrietta is located near the center of Clay County 20 miles (32 km) southeast of Wichita Falls, 28 miles (45 km) northwest of Bowie, and 95 miles (153 km) northwest of Fort Worth.

According to the United States Census Bureau, Henrietta has a total area of 5.2 square miles (13.5 km^{2}), of which 5.1 square miles (13.2 km^{2}) is land and 0.1 square miles (0.3 km^{2}), or 1.96%, is water.

=== Climate ===
Climate data for Henrietta, Texas (1991–2020)
Month	Jan	Feb	Mar	Apr	May	Jun	Jul	Aug	Sep	Oct	Nov	Dec	Year
Mean daily maximum °F (°C)	54.8 (12.7)	58.1 (14.5)	67.8 (19.9)	75.7 (24.3)	83.1 (28.4)	91.1 (32.8)	96.5 (35.8)	96.3 (35.7)	88.2 (31.2)	78.1 (25.6)	65.6 (18.7)	56.0 (13.3)	75.9 (24.4)
Daily mean °F (°C)	41.8 (5.4)	45.1 (7.3)	54.1 (12.3)	61.7 (16.5)	70.9 (21.6)	79.1 (26.2)	83.9 (28.8)	82.9 (28.3)	75.3 (24.1)	64.6 (18.1)	52.4 (11.3)	43.7 (6.5)	63.0 (17.2)
Mean daily minimum °F (°C)	28.9 (−1.7)	32.1 (0.1)	40.3 (4.6)	47.6 (8.7)	58.8 (14.9)	67.1 (19.5)	71.3 (21.8)	69.5 (20.8)	62.4 (16.9)	51.2 (10.7)	39.1 (3.9)	31.4 (−0.3)	50.0 (10.0)
Average precipitation inches (mm)	1.69 (43)	1.84 (47)	2.59 (66)	2.71 (69)	4.69 (119)	3.59 (91)	1.80 (46)	3.07 (78)	2.59 (66)	3.55 (90)	2.24 (57)	1.67 (42)	32.03 (814)
Average snowfall inches (cm)	0.3 (0.76)	0.1 (0.25)	0.0 (0.0)	0.0 (0.0)	0.0 (0.0)	0.0 (0.0)	0.0 (0.0)	0.0 (0.0)	0.0 (0.0)	0.0 (0.0)	0.3 (0.76)	0.2 (0.51)	0.9 (2.28)
Source: NOAA

== Demographics ==
Historical population
Census	Pop.	Note	%±
1890	2,100		—
1900	1,614		−23.1%
1910	2,104		30.4%
1920	2,563		21.8%
1930	2,020		−21.2%
1940	2,391		18.4%
1950	2,813		17.6%
1960	3,062		8.9%
1970	2,897		−5.4%
1980	3,149		8.7%
1990	2,896		−8.0%
2000	3,264		12.7%
2010	3,141		−3.8%
2020	3,111		−1.0%
U.S. Decennial Census

=== 2020 census ===
As of the 2020 census, there were 3,111 people, 1,281 households, and 817 families residing in the city. The median age was 41.7 years, 23.0% of residents were under the age of 18, and 20.0% of residents were 65 years of age or older. For every 100 females there were 91.6 males, and for every 100 females age 18 and over there were 87.6 males age 18 and over.

0.0% of residents lived in urban areas, while 100.0% lived in rural areas.

Of the 1,281 households in Henrietta, 29.1% had children under the age of 18 living in them. Of all households, 50.0% were married-couple households, 16.2% were households with a male householder and no spouse or partner present, and 28.8% were households with a female householder and no spouse or partner present. About 30.0% of all households were made up of individuals and 15.0% had someone living alone who was 65 years of age or older.

There were 1,493 housing units, of which 14.2% were vacant. The homeowner vacancy rate was 3.4% and the rental vacancy rate was 6.8%.

Racial composition as of the 2020 census
Race	Number	Percent
White	2,807	90.2%
Black or African American	22	0.7%
American Indian and Alaska Native	28	0.9%
Asian	29	0.9%
Native Hawaiian and Other Pacific Islander	0	0.0%
Some other race	43	1.4%
Two or more races	182	5.9%
Hispanic or Latino (of any race)	166	5.3%

== Education ==
The city is served by the Henrietta Independent School District. South of town between Henrietta and Jacksboro, the public school option is the Midway Independent School District.

== Transportation ==
- U.S. Highway 287 west to Wichita Falls; east-southeast to Fort Worth
- U.S. Highway 82 west to Lubbock; east to Nocona
- State Highway 148 south to Jacksboro; north to Petrolia
- Farm to Market Road 1197 north to Hurnville
- Farm to Market Road 2847 southwest to FM 2606, Lake Arrowhead, and Halsell

== Climate ==
The climate in this area is characterized by hot, humid summers and generally mild to cool winters. According to the Köppen Climate Classification system, Henrietta has a humid subtropical climate, abbreviated "Cfa" on climate maps.

== Notable people ==
- Charline Arthur (1929–1987), boogie woogie and blues musician
- Finis Alonzo Crutchfield Jr. (1916–1986), United Methodist Church bishop, born in Henrietta
- Frank N. Ikard, congressman from Texas's 13th congressional district from 1951 to 1961, born in Henrietta in 1913

== See also ==
- Abilene Trail
