= 1979 Red River Valley tornado outbreak =

Severe weather event in April 1979

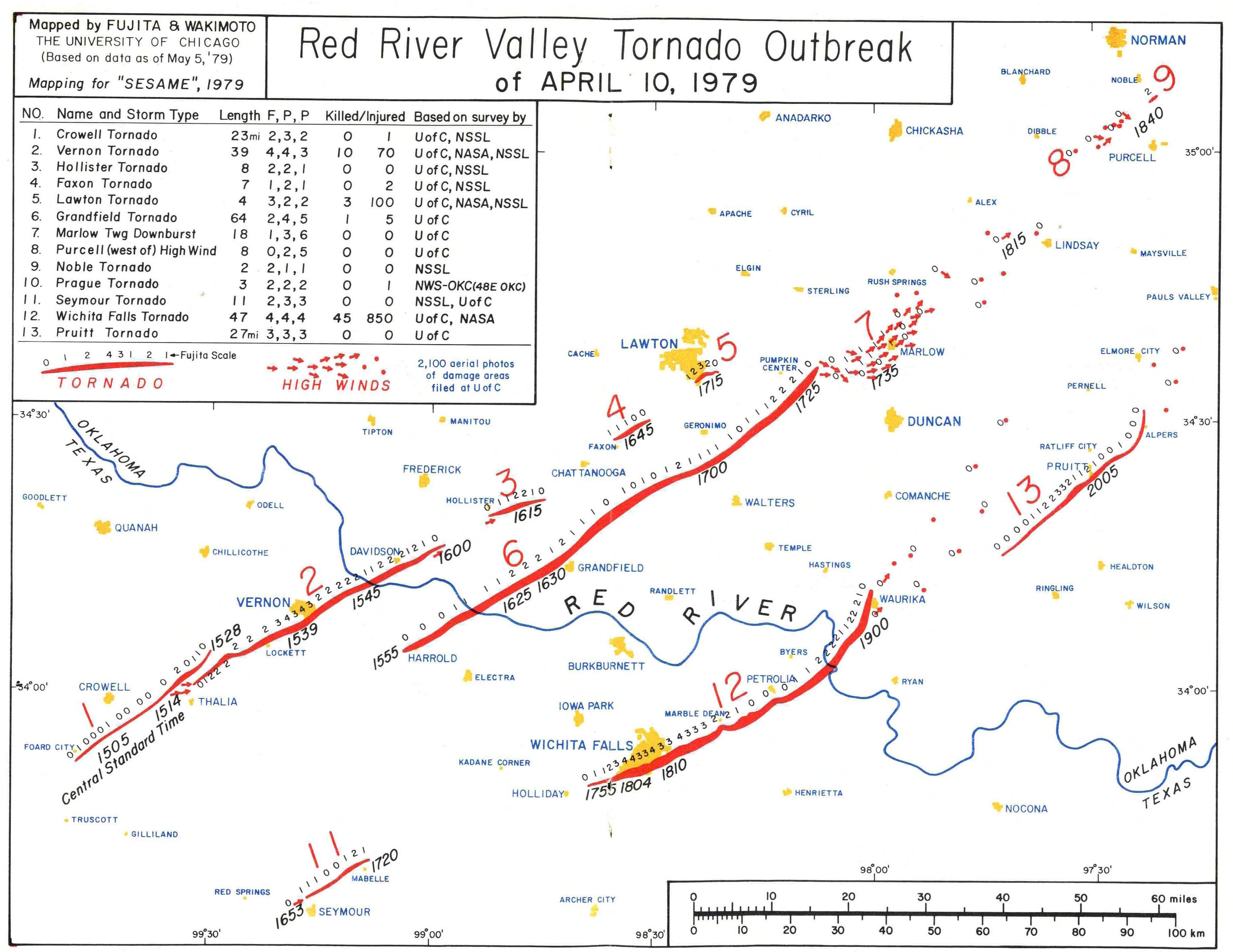
- Ted Fujita's map of the Red Rivery Valley tornadoes on April 10 along with associated ratings along their damage paths.

Meteorological history
- Duration: April 10–12, 1979

Tornado outbreak
- Tornadoes: 58
- Max. rating: F4 tornado

Overall effects
- Fatalities: 61
- Injuries: 1,976
- Damage: ≳$440 million (1979 USD)
- Areas affected: Texas, Oklahoma (Red River Valley), Midwestern United States, Southern United States
- Part of the Tornadoes of 1979

On Tuesday, April 10, 1979, a widespread and destructive outbreak of severe weather impacted areas near the Red River between Oklahoma and Texas. Thunderstorms developed over West and North Central Texas during the day within highly unstable atmospheric conditions following the northward surge of warm and moist air into the region, producing large hail, strong winds, and multiple tornadoes. At least 22 tornadoes were documented on April 10, of which two were assigned an F4 rating on the Fujita scale; four of the tornadoes caused fatalities.

Hardest hit were the communities of Vernon, Texas; Lawton, Oklahoma; and Wichita Falls, Texas, which were all impacted by strong tornadoes. The F4 Vernon tornado struck southern and eastern parts of the city at approximately 4:45 p.m. CST, destroying several residential blocks and killing 11 people. An F3 tornado spun up in Lawton at 5:05 p.m. CST, (Note: In 1979, Daylight saving time in the United States began on the last Sunday of April. Thus, the tornado outbreak fell outside the daylight saving period. The beginning of daylight saving time was moved to the first Sunday in April starting in 1987.) destroying 167 buildings and killing 3 people. The most significant tornado of the day was an F4 tornado that began east-northeast of Holliday, Texas, at around 5:50 p.m. CST and moved east-northeast into Wichita Falls, taking a 8 mi (13 km) course through densely populated areas of the city and destroying over two thousand homes across several neighborhoods. The tornado spanned as wide as 1.5 mi (2.4 km) across during its passage through the city, with the most severe damage occurring within a 0.5 mi (0.80 km) wide swath. At least 45 people were killed within the city and nearly 1,800 people were injured, ranking the tornado among the deadliest in Texas history. A majority of the fatalities occurred as the tornado mangled and tossed vehicles. The damage wrought by the Wichita Falls tornado was unprecedented, with the $400 million ($1.865B in 2025 dollars) damage toll making it the costliest tornado on record at the time. The severe weather event was widely observed by scientific instruments due to its serendipitous occurrence during a NASA field campaign. Later studies referred to the tornado outbreak as the Red River Valley Tornado Outbreak, and in the areas affected the day came to be known as Terrible Tuesday.

The same weather system associated with the tornado outbreak produced additional thunderstorms and tornadoes on April 11, particularly in Arkansas. While tornadic activity was more widespread on April 11 compared to April 10 far fewer casualties occurred. The weather system also produced intense rainfall over Mississippi and Alabama that culminated in the 1979 Easter flood, the worst disaster to befall Jackson, Mississippi in over a century.

== Meteorological synopsis ==
=== Preceding the event ===
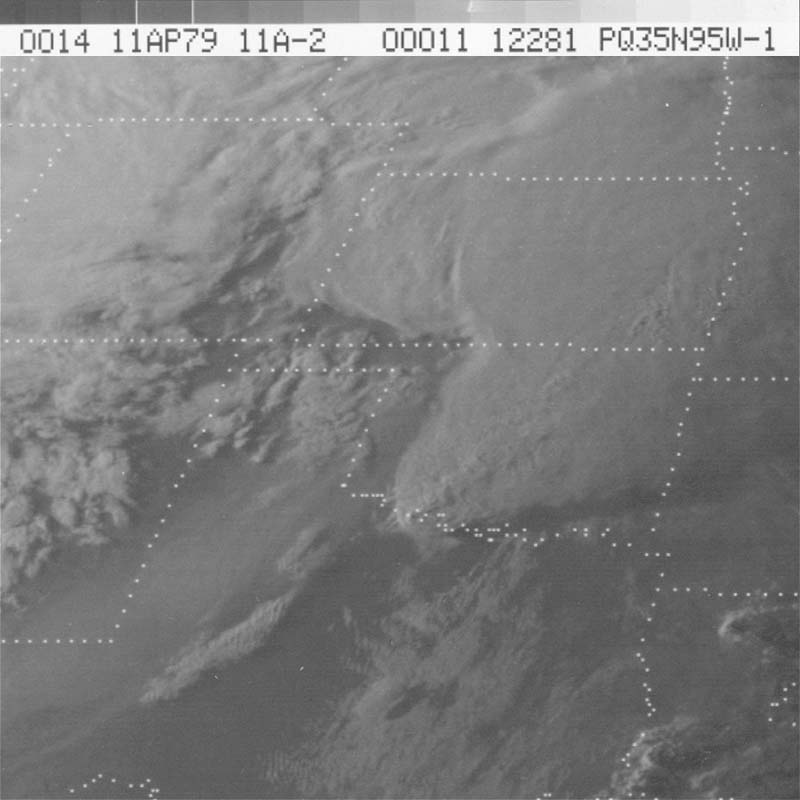
GOES-3 satellite image showing storms over the Red River Valley on the evening of April 10

On April 9, a strong upper-tropospheric trough was located over the western United States. At roughly 40,000 ft (12,000 m) above the surface, a powerful jet stream extended from the eastern Pacific to South Texas. Although a cold front moving south during the day brought substantially cooler conditions to Oklahoma, it quickly weakened over Texas. Warm and moist air remained over South Texas ahead of the disturbances. Meteorological computer models using data collected at 6 p.m. CST April 9 suggested that severe weather was possible the next day for parts of Oklahoma and Texas but did not as indicate as clearly the possibility of a tornado outbreak. The upper-tropospheric trough moved slower than modeling projected and by 6:00 a.m. CST April 10 had become oriented north-northeast to south-southwest, a characteristically negative tilt associated with many severe weather outbreaks. An occluded front stretched from a quickly intensifying low-pressure area in Colorado into the Texas Panhandle, representing one area conducive to storm development. A wide expanse of stratus clouds covered much of Central Texas during the morning hours as a result of a stable airmass over the area. However, strong southerly winds closer to the surface brought moisture northward from South Texas, concurrent with a rapid increase in atmospheric instability over North Texas. Due to the presence of directional wind shear, the winds over the Red River Valley brought moist air from the south closer to the surface, and drier air from the west further aloft, enhancing convective instability. The leading edge of the northward surge of moisture was marked by an ill-defined warm front. Dew points across the region increased by around 10–15 °F (5.6–8.3 °C) to near 60 °F (16 °C).

A line of thunderstorms developed over North Texas on the morning of April 10 in response to the surge of warm air, with small hail up to 1 in (25 mm) diameter associated with some of the storms. Within the nearby jet stream, an area of locally intense winds – a jet streak – moved towards the northeast towards the expanding unstable airmass over north-central Texas. The passage of this core of intense winds aloft induced strong southwesterly winds closer to the surface over eastern New Mexico and West Texas, leading to widespread blowing dust. Wind gusts exceeded 60 mph (97 km/h) across West Texas and reached as high as 93 mph (150 km/h) at Guadalupe Mountains National Park. The dew point at Marfa, Texas, was 10 °F (−12 °C) compared to dew points near 70 °F (21 °C) over central Texas. This surge of dry air, moving towards the east-northeast at roughly 30 kn (35 mph; 56 km/h), marked another potential region for storm development. A second area of thunderstorms began to quickly intensify along the leading edge of this dry line and along the occluded front between Amarillo, Texas, and Plainview, Texas. Hail up to 1.5 in (38 mm) in diameter was reported in association with these storms, as well as a tornado east of Plainview at around 1:38 p.m. CST that caused no damage. A third area of thunderstorms, albeit short-lived, developed west of Abilene, Texas, along the western edge of a small region of high pressure. While several of the morning's storms moved towards stable conditions and were poised to eventually weaken, particularly conducive conditions for intense thunderstorm development materialized near Lubbock, Texas, at the intersection of the surging dry line, the warm front, and the western edge of the high pressure region.

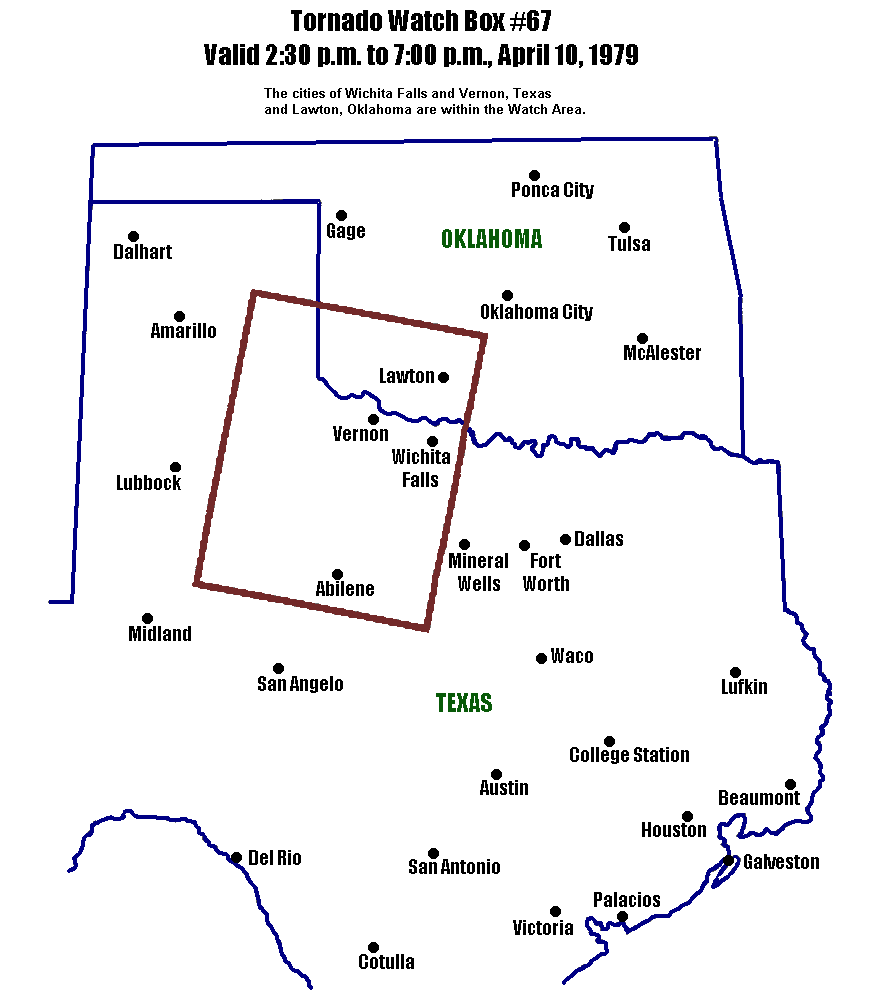
A tornado watch was issued for parts of southwestern Oklahoma and northern Texas on the afternoon of April 10.

By the afternoon of April 10, both the warm front and the region of strong winds associated with the jet stream had reached the Red River area, resulting in stronger wind shear. A low-pressure area had also developed in the vicinity of Childress, Texas at around 1–2 p.m. CST, and would serve as a focusing mechanism for converging moisture over the Red River Valley. The National Severe Storms Forecasting Center (NSSFC) issued a tornado watch at 1:55 p.m. CST on April 10 for a 30,000 mi^{2} (78,000 km^{2}) area encompassing parts of southwestern Oklahoma and north-central Texas. The watch statement highlighted the potential for tornadoes, large hail, and damaging winds within the watch area. Within the risk region, the air pressure fell by 6–8 mbar (0.18–0.24 inHg) in three hours; such drastic pressure falls can precede tornado outbreaks. Strong convergence of moisture was also observed in the areas where storms eventually formed.

=== Tornado outbreak ===
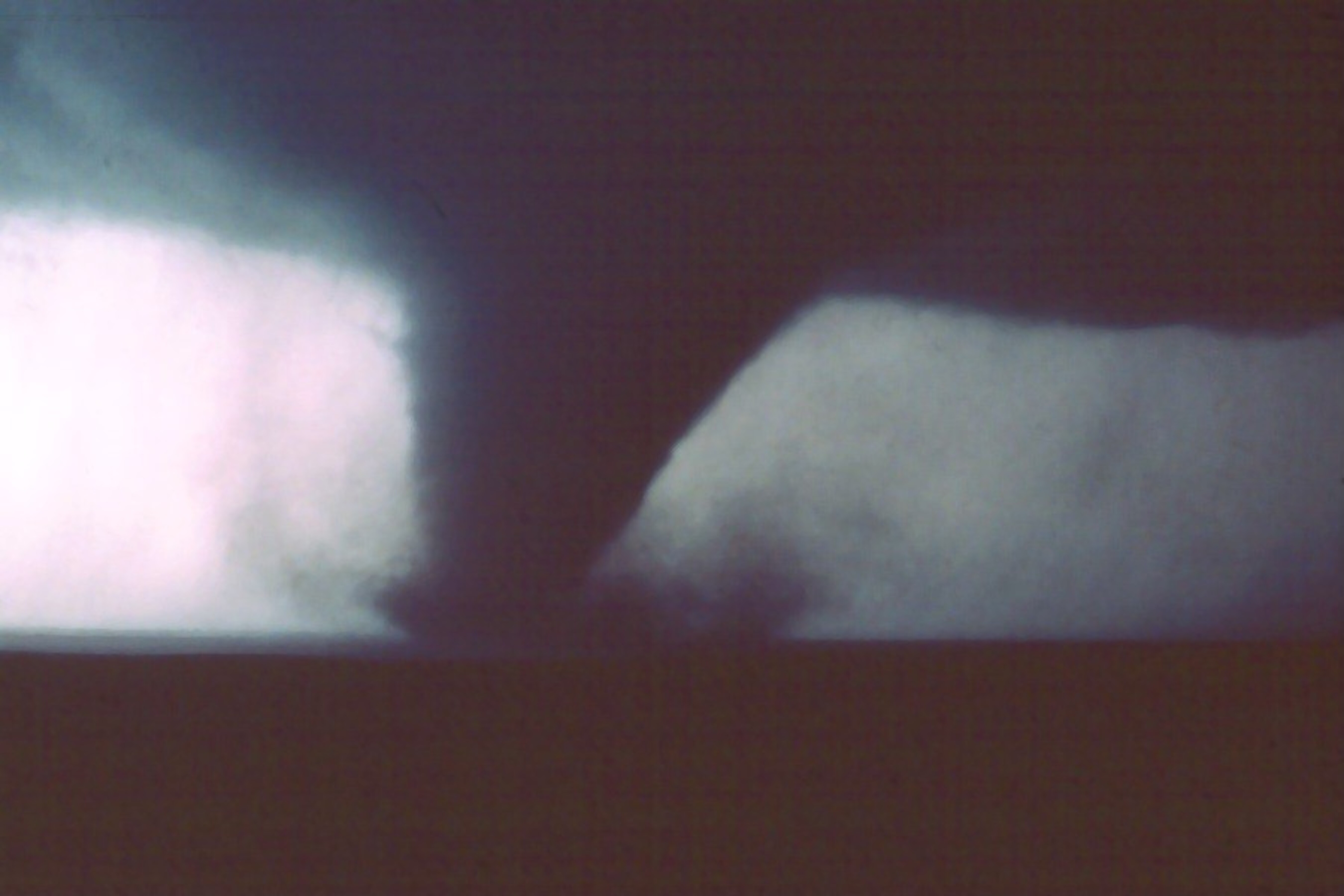
The Seymour tornado

The arrival of the jet streak contributed to the conversion of the atmospheric instability accumulating near the Red River into thunderstorm formation. Just before the onset of the tornado outbreak, a low level jet with winds of 20 m/s (45 mph; 72 km/h) materialized over north-central Texas in response to the approach of the jet streak higher aloft, accelerating the transport of heat and moisture northward into the Red River Valley. Thunderstorms developed near Lubbock and moved east-northeastward into a region of high potential instability near the Red River, becoming the strongest thunderstorms of the day. In particular, three isolated supercell thunderstorms caused the majority of the severe weather during the afternoon and evening of April 10; all developed in the localized area of supportive conditions near the frontal intersection. The first thunderstorm formed around 1:00 p.m. CST spawned five tornadoes between 3:05 p.m. CST and 5:15 p.m. CST, including an F4-rated tornado that struck Vernon, Texas, and an F3-rated tornado that struck Lawton, Oklahoma. The second thunderstorm formed around 2:30 p.m. CST, while the third formed around 4:30 p.m. CST. The second supercell produced a tornado that began at 3:55 p.m. and took 64 mi (103 km) long track – the longest track of any tornado during the event – through primarily rural areas near Harrold, Texas and Grandfield, Oklahoma. The most damaging tornado, associated with the third supercell, began at around 5:55 p.m. CST and struck Wichita Falls, Texas. These storms persisted into nighttime over central and eastern Oklahoma. The breakout of severe weather and tornadoes associated with the thunderstorms near the Red River during the afternoon and evening of April 10 was collectively termed the "Red River Valley outbreak" or the "Red River Valley tornado outbreak" by scientists studying the event. At least 12 tornadoes occurred within 47 mi (75 km) of Wichita Falls in a single two-hour period. The last tornado that occurred in the Red River Valley occurred around 8:00 p.m. CST in connection with the third supercell near Pruitt City, Oklahoma. The thunderstorms that produced the tornadoes in the Red River Valley continued into Arkansas and southern Missouri during the overnight hours but did not produce severe weather.

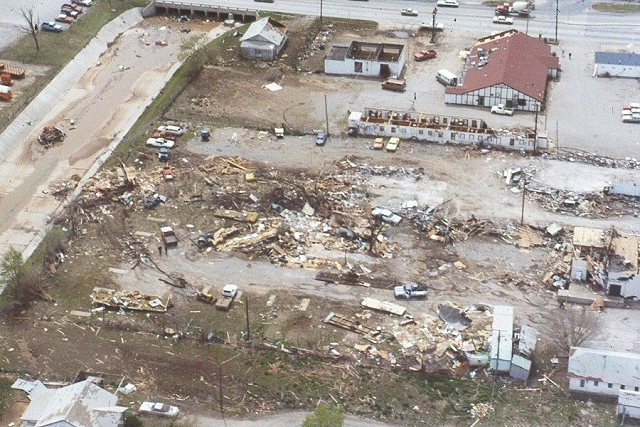
Tornadic damage in Lawton

The arrival of a second and weaker region of strong winds within the nearby jet stream led to the development of severe thunderstorms, including some tornadoes, farther south over west-central and northern Texas during the overnight hours. These tornadoes caused extensive damage in rural areas and some injuries. Like the severe event earlier in the day along the Red River, the development of these storms was aided by a localized area of low pressure that developed near Abilene at around 7:20 p.m. CST. Additional storms also persisted over the Midwestern United States into the morning of April 11. The broader weather system that produced the severe weather on April 10 continued eastward towards the Mississippi River Valley the next day and intensified. April 11 ultimately proved to be a more active day for severe weather, with Arkansas experiencing most of the day's tornadoes; however, fewer casualties resulted from the tornadoes compared to the previous day. The 27 tornadoes that were ultimately documented by the National Oceanic and Atmospheric Administration in Arkansas during April 1979 set a new monthly record high for the state. Heavy rains over Mississippi and Alabama associated with the same weather system on April 11–13 led to extensive flooding along the banks of the Pearl River and Tombigbee River. Rainfall totals reached 10–20 in (250–510 mm), with the flood near Jackson, Mississippi, being representative of a 1 in 500-year or 1 in 100-year flood event.

== Confirmed tornadoes ==
NWS offices in Texas and Oklahoma reported 56 fatalities from the tornadoes on April 10, with 53 in Texas and 3 in Oklahoma across a combined 12 counties. Another 1,916 people were injured, of which 256 were hospitalized. The American Red Cross reported 2,934 homes destroyed with another 3,263 damaged. April 10 featured the most damaging tornado outbreak since the 1974 Super Outbreak. Four tornadoes caused fatalities that day. The NWS characterized the tornado outbreak as "one of the most significant tornado outbreaks that ever occurred in western north Texas and southern Oklahoma." The atmospheric environment surrounding the April 10 severe weather outbreak and the thunderstorms that eventually formed were closely observed as part of the Severe Environmental Storms and Mesoscale Experiment (SESAME), a scientific field campaign aimed at studying severe weather. As part of SESAME, an extensive survey of affected areas was undertaken following the event, including interviews of civil defense directors and ground and aerial surveys of tornado paths. Damage along the paths of 12 of the tornadoes on April 10 were rated with the Fujita scale by Ted Fujita and Roger Wakimoto based on observations from a low-flying Cessna aircraft on April 12–13, with a presumed ±1 margin of error.

Daily statistics of tornadoes during the tornado outbreak of April 10–12, 1979
Date (Note: All dates are based on the local time zone where the tornado began; however, all times are in Coordinated Universal Time for consistency.)	Total	F-scale rating							Deaths	Injuries
Date	Total	F?	F0	F1	F2	F3	F4	F5	Deaths	Injuries
April 10	25	1	4	6	9	3	2	0	60	1,922
April 11	32	4	1	11	15	1	0	0	1	54
April 12	1	0	0	0	1	0	0	0	0	0
Total	58	5	5	17	25	4	2	0	61	1,976

=== April 10 event ===
List of confirmed tornadoes – Tuesday, April 10, 1979
F#	Location	County / Parish	State	Start Coord. (Note: All starting coordinates are based on the National Centers for Environmental Information (NCEI) Storm Events database and may not reflect contemporary analyses.)	Time (UTC) (Note: Times as listed in Storm Data unless otherwise noted.)	Path length (Note: Path lengths as listed in Storm Data unless otherwise noted.)	Width (Note: Widths as listed in Storm Data unless otherwise noted. The listed width values are primarily the average/mean width of the tornadoes. From 1952 to 1994, reports largely list mean width whereas contemporary years list maximum width.)
F0	SE of Crosbyton	Crosby	TX	38.65°N 101.23°W	19:08	2 mi (3.2 km) (Note: Datum from Storm Events.)	50 yd (46 m)
F0	A tornado occurred over open country southeast of Crosbyton, causing no damage.						
F?	E of Plainview	Hale	TX	34.20°N 101.68°W	19:38	—N/a	—N/a
F?	A tornado occurred over open country east of Plainview. Storm Events does not assign a rating for this tornado.						
F2	S of Foard City to SE of Crowell to near Rayland	Foard	TX	34.20°N 101.68°W	21:05–21:28	23 mi (37 km)	150 yd (140 m)
F2	A significant tornado moved across Foard County, destroying, unroofing, or otherwise damaging homes. The tornado also destroyed barns, telephone poles, and farm equipment. Total property damage was estimated by the NOAA at $50,000–$500,000. One person was injured.						
F4	N of Thalia, TX to Vernon, TX to E of Davidson, OK	Foard (TX), Wilbarger (TX), Tillman (OK)	TX, OK	34.03°N 99.47°W	21:20–22:00	37 mi (60 km)	880 yd (800 m)
F4	11 deaths, – See section on this tornado – There were 67 injuries.						
F0	E of Crowell	Foard	TX	33.98°N 99.53°W	21:20	2.5 mi (4.0 km)	100 yd (91 m)
F0	A tornado caused damage near the intersection of US 70 and FM 267.						
F2	Harrold, TX to Grandfield, OK to Pumpkin Center, OK	Wilbarger (TX), Wichita (TX), Tillman (OK), Cotton (OK), Comanche (OK), Stephens (OK)	TX, OK	34.08°N 99.03°W	21:55–23:25 (Note: Datum from contemporary analysis by Ron Alberty, Donald Burgess, and Ted Fujita.)	64 mi (103 km)	1,056 yd (966 m)
F2	1 death – A tornado began in the Harrold area, moving across US 287 and crossing into Wichita County, where it inflicted light rural damage. One person was killed while sheltering beneath a semi-trailer on US-287. After tracking for 9 mi (14 km) over Texas, the tornado crossed the Red River into Oklahoma at around 4:10 p.m. CST. While the tornado remained at F0 intensity over Texas, it began strengthening after crossing the river. The tornado intensified over Oklahoma and was near its maximum intensity when it reached the Grandfield airport at around 4:30 p.m. CST. It caused considerable damage at the airport, destroying eight planes and damaging another. Twelve homes in the Grandfield area were either damaged or destroyed, including four mobile homes. Three people were injured in the Grandfield area, including one seriously. The tornado crossed SH-5 west of Walters, Oklahoma, as a slightly weaker F1 tornado. Five homes were destroyed and four others were damaged northwest of Walters. The tornado then reintensified and produced a second region of F2-intensity damage 12 mi (19 km) southeast of Lawton as it approached Hulen and Pumpkin Center. Around Pumpkin Center, 13 homes were destroyed; some of the homes were impacted by a tornado a year prior. Additional homes were damaged along SH-7. The tornado was the longest-tracked tornado of both the tornado outbreak and of the entirety of 1979 in the United States. Five people were injured. A 3 mi (4.8 km) wide swath of wind damage, with an intensity equivalent to an F0–F1 tornado, extended past the end of the tornado path and impacted the Marlow area.						
F2	S of Hollister	Tillman	OK	34.35°N 98.90°W	22:05–22:15	11 mi (18 km)	120 yd (110 m)
F2	The thunderstorm that produced the earlier tornado that struck Vernon, Texas, produced another tornado that began 1 mi (1.6 km) south of Hollister. The tornado destroyed three houses and damaged others. One person was injured.						
F1	SW of Faxon	Comanche	OK	34.47°N 98.62°W	22:35	9 mi (14 km)	100 yd (91 m)
F1	A tornado spun up 2 mi (3.2 km) southwest of Faxon, destroying a mobile home and injuring one person. Two others were injured following the destruction of a second mobile home. Additional homes were damaged. Three people were injured. Thomas P. Grazulis assessed the tornado as causing F2 damage while Fujita and Wakimoto graded only as high as F1-intensity damage north of Faxon.						
F2	NW of Seymour to NNE of Mabelle	Baylor	TX	33.62°N 99.30°W	22:49–23:12	11 mi (18 km)	300 yd (270 m)
F2	A tornado touched down intermittently in the Seymour area, leading to scattered roof damage. The tornado strengthened as it moved northeast away from Seymour and into rural areas. Most of the tornado path was over open country, impacting various outbuildings. Telephone poles were downed by the tornado along US 283. The tornado was targeted by the University of Oklahoma's Severe Storms Intercept Project—1979, which was intended to supplement the concurrent SESAME field campaign through visual observation and documentation of severe storms. Footage was captured of the Seymour tornado's developmental and mature stages. The intercept team conducted a survey of the tornado path, documenting a segment of denuded tree branch that was lodged 18 cm (7.1 in) into the ground and mesquite pulled from the ground by the tornado. The thunderstorm that produced the Seymour tornado later spawned the violent tornado that hit Wichita Falls.						
F3	Lawton	Comanche	OK	34.57°N 98.42°W	23:05	4 mi (6.4 km)	170 yd (160 m)
F3	3 deaths – A tornado warning was first posted for southern Comanche County, at 4:15 p.m. CST, with tornado sirens activated in Lawton, shortly thereafter. A tornado began roughly 0.5 mi (0.80 km) north of the Lawton–Fort Sill Regional Airport terminal building at 5:05 p.m. CST and moved into Lawton, impacting areas near the intersection between 2nd Street and Lee Boulevard. The tornado's path curved gradually to the east thereafter, cutting across the H. E. Bailey Turnpike. There, the tornado reached its maximum intensity as an upper-end F3 tornado. It then moved erratically before dissipating. Three people were killed by the tornado and 100 others were injured. The tornado damaged 449 structures, of which 116 were destroyed. The damage toll reached $9 million.						
F1	WSW of Iowa Park	Wichita	TX	33.90°N 98.80°W	23:08	—N/a	—N/a
F1	A narrow and brief tornado occurred near Rocky Point, causing no damage.						
F4	ENE of Holliday, TX to Wichita Falls, TX to NNE of Waurika, OK	Archer (TX), Wichita (TX), Clay (TX), Jefferson (OK)	TX, OK	33.82°N 98.65°W	23:50–01:00	47 mi (76 km)	1,320 yd (1,210 m)
F4	≥45 deaths – See article on this tornado – There were 1,740 injuries.						
F1	Wichita Falls	Wichita	TX	33.90°N 98.50°W	00:00	2 mi (3.2 km)	50 yd (46 m)
F1	A small tornado caused intermittent damage in northwestern Wichita Falls while the primary Wichita Falls tornado was impacting southern parts of the city. Witnesses described the tornado as bearing a small funnel cloud without condensation reaching the surface. Several structures were damaged, including a home and several outbuildings. A drive-in theater screen was also downed by the tornado. The damage was initially assessed as being caused by straight-line thunderstorm winds.						
F2	N of Purcell, Oklahoma	Cleveland	OK	35.10°N 97.37°W	00:40	2 mi (3.2 km)	37 yd (34 m)
F2	A tornado damaged two barns 6 mi (9.7 km) north of Purcell.						
F2	SW of Prague	Pottawatomie, Lincoln	OK	35.42°N 97.75°W	00:45	3 mi (4.8 km)	100 yd (91 m)
F2	A tornado moved across the Prague, Oklahoma, area, destroying two mobile homes and damaging another three homes. One person in a mobile home was injured.						
F2	Noble	Cleveland	OK	35.10°N 97.40°W	00:50	1.5 mi (2.4 km)	40 yd (37 m)
F2	A mobile home was razed by a tornado near Noble.						
F1	SE of Hays	Ellis	KS	38.87°N 99.32°W	01:30	0.5 mi (0.80 km)	65 yd (59 m)
F1	A tornado damaged several buildings in southeastern Hays, including 20 mobile homes. The tornado inflicted minor injuries on two people upon overturning their mobile home.						
F3	NW of Ringling to Pruitt City to NE of Ratliff City	Carter	OK	34.35°N 97.60°W	01:55–02:20	16 mi (26 km)	170 yd (160 m)
F3	The tornado began 9 mi (14 km) northeast of Ringling and was on the ground intermittently as it moved north-northeast. The tornado moved through Pruitt City at around 8:05 p.m. CST, destroying or damaging 44 homes and at least five cars.						
F0	W of Maud	Pottawatomie	OK	34.10°N 96.82°W	02:05	—N/a	—N/a
F0	One of two small simultaneous tornadoes that occurred near Maud.						
F0	N of Maud	Pottawatomie	OK	34.12°N 96.80°W	02:05	—N/a	—N/a
F0	One of two small simultaneous tornadoes that occurred near Maud.						
F2	NE of Ballinger to W of Novice	Runnels, Coleman	TX	31.97°N 99.80°W	03:00	20.5 mi (33.0 km)	1,320 yd (1,210 m)
F2	A large tornado moved across largely open country, destroying some barns. The width of the damage varied between 0.5 mi (0.80 km) and 1 mi (1.6 km) wide. Several homes were also damaged by the tornado.						
F3	ESE of Ballinger to NNE of Coleman	Runnels, Coleman	TX	31.70°N 99.75°W	03:30–04:10	25 mi (40 km)	440 yd (400 m)
F3	A tornado spun up 12 mi (19 km) east-southeast of Ballinger, causing significant damage to buildings and power lines. The tornado crossed US 67 roughly 5 mi (8.0 km) west of Valera, blowing a car off the road and damaging a nearby house. The tornado's impacts were especially prominent north of Coleman. Buildings were damaged near Hords Creek Lake and Lake Scarborough. Barns were destroyed and trees were uprooted along US 283 about 5 mi (8.0 km) north of Coleman. The damage toll inflicted by the tornado was approximately $565,000 and one person was injured.						
F1	ESE of Comanche	Comanche	TX	31.87°N 98.52°W	05:50	—N/a	—N/a
F1	A brief tornado destroyed a barn east-southeast of Comanche.						
F2	N of Energy to W of Hico	Comanche, Hamilton	TX	31.75°N 98.37°W	05:50–06:30	22 mi (35 km)	200 yd (180 m)
F2	A tornado damaged trees and roofs near Energy and Lamkin in Comanche County. The tornado moved into Hamilton County, damaging roofs and trees in southeastern Carlton. Barns and farm homes were damaged to the north-northeast. Three people were injured.						
F1	W of Mineral Wells	Palo Pinto	TX	32.80°N 98.12°W	05:56–06:00	—N/a	—N/a
F1	A brief tornado caused no damage west of Mineral Wells.						

=== April 11 event ===
List of confirmed tornadoes – Wednesday, April 11, 1979
F#	Location	County / Parish	State	Start Coord.	Time (UTC)	Path length	Width
F1	Allen	Pontotoc	OK	34.90°N 96.40°W	06:01	3 mi (4.8 km)	50 yd (46 m)
F1	A tornado impacted Allen. The most severe damage was inflicted to two buildings at a lumber yard. A window was blown out of the Allen city hall. Several trees were also uprooted.						
F2	Kingston	Marshall	OK	34.03°N 96.75°W	07:05	—N/a	—N/a
F2	A mobile home and three barns were destroyed near Kingston at around 1:10 a.m. CST.						
F1	W of Sherman	Grayson	TX	33.63°N 96.73°W	08:06	—N/a	—N/a
F1	A thunderstorm produced several funnel clouds in Grayson County. One developed into a brief tornado that caused no damage west of Sherman.						
F?	SW of Muskogee	Muskogee	OK	35.70°N 95.60°W	10:00	—N/a	—N/a
F?	A tornado caused no damage after spinning up 15 mi (24 km) southwest of Muskogee.						
F2	Hattieville to Wonderview	Conway	AR	35.27°N 92.80°W	13:10	4.5 mi (7.2 km)	200 yd (180 m)
F2	Six barns and two homes were destroyed by a tornado that tracked east-northeastward from Hattieville to Wonderview. Another four barns, two homes, and some outbuildings were damaged. The damage toll amounted to $110,000.						
F1	W of Fox	Stone	AR	35.78°N 92.30°W	14:42–14:55	8.5 mi (13.7 km)	150 yd (140 m)
F1	A tornado began 0.25 mi (0.40 km) west of Fox and tracked towards the northeast, destroying or damaging chicken houses and outbuildings before dissipating 4 mi (6.4 km) west of Mountain View. The damage toll reached $185,000.						
F2	Blue Mountain to Prairie Grove	Washington	AR	35.83°N 94.348°W	16:02	11 mi (18 km)	200 yd (180 m)
F2	The Center Point community 2.5 mi (4.0 km) south of Prairie Grove was hit hardest by the tornado. Three homes were destroyed and others were damaged. Three people in a mobile home at Center Point were injured; another person was injured in Blue Mountain. The tornado inflicted $175,000 in damage.						
F2	NW of Athens to Martin's Mill	Henderson, Van Zandt	TX	32.25°N 95.90°W	16:07–16:30	14 mi (23 km)	150 yd (140 m)
F2	Within Henderson County, Texas, the tornado downed power lines and uprooted trees across a 10 mi (16 km) path, cutting power to the community of Bethel. The tornado also inflicted minor damage to homes in rural areas. The tornado proceeded to track across 4 mi (6.4 km) of Van Zandt County, before lifting.						
F2	Sulphur Springs	Hopkins	TX	33.12°N 95.60°W	16:12–16:20	8 mi (13 km)	150 yd (140 m)
F2	Five to six homes on the southern side of Sulphur Springs, sustained minor damage. A Rockwell International manufacturing plant in the city incurred $100,000 in damage when it was unroofed. The tornado proceeded to damage homes, farms, and outbuildings northeast of Sulphur Springs. A mobile home was flipped over by the tornado in Mahoney.						
F2+	N of Eagletown, OK to Grannis, AR to SE of Mena, AR	McCurtain (OK), Polk (AR), Sevier (AR)	OK, AR	34.00°N 94.60°W	16:15	40 mi (64 km)	440 yd (400 m)
F2+	Within Oklahoma, three people were injured when their mobile home was destroyed by the tornado. The tornado crossed into Arkansas west of DeQueen Lake at 11:31 a.m. CST and impacted Grannis and Wickes. In Grannis, 25 homes and an elementary school were destroyed. Another 12 homes and a poultry plant were damaged. All 17 of the injuries documented in Arkansas from the tornado occurred in Grannis; four of the injuries were to elementary school students at the elementary school. The tornado destroyed three homes in Wickes and significantly damaged another four homes. The damage toll amounted to approximately $1.75 million. Grazulis assessed the tornado as reaching F3 intensity.						
F1	Hainesville	Wood	TX	32.72°N 95.37°W	17:02	—N/a	—N/a
F1	A brief tornado occurred in Hainesville, without causing damage.						
F?	W of Hurley	Stone	MO	36.93°N 93.53°W	17:30	—N/a	50 yd (46 m)
F?	A brief tornado occurred over open country west of Hurley.						
F2	W of Rosston	Nevada	AR	33.60°N 93.37°W	20:10	0.5 mi (0.80 km)	200 yd (180 m)
F2	Three homes were destroyed; others sustained minor damage.						
F2	SW of Guy	Faulkner	AR	35.30°N 92.37°W	20:15	3 mi (4.8 km)	440 yd (400 m)
F2	A tornado impacted a cemetery and utility lines and inflicted heavy damage on several buildings, resulting in $190,000 in damage.						
F2	East End to ENE of Lonoke	Saline, Pulaski, Lonoke	AR	34.55°N 92.33°W	21:00	41 mi (66 km)	200 yd (180 m)
F2	The tornado destroyed several mobile homes and damaged outbuildings and farm machinery. East End and southeastern Pulaski County experienced the worst impacts. The tornado caused approximately $1.15 million in damage across three counties, with the bulk of the damage occurring in Pulaski and Saline counties.						
F1	Homer	Claiborne	LA	32.78°N 93.08°W	21:00	2 mi (3.2 km)	100 yd (91 m)
F1	Southern and eastern sections of Homer were impacted by a tornado, resulting in $75,000 in damage. Five homes were damaged, and a lumber yard was unroofed.						
F3	SW of Cabool to Houston to E of Licking	Douglas, Texas	MO	37.02°N 92.12°W	21:00	36 mi (58 km)	400 yd (370 m)
F3	The tornado began just within Douglas County southwest of Cabool. In southern Cabool, grain bins and buildings at the Ballew Feed Center were badly damaged. Many other farm buildings were either damaged or destroyed southwest of Cabool. The tornado briefly lifted as it passed over Cabool, but began to cause damage again in the northeastern part of the town. The tornado struck the Cabool airport, flattening four hangars and heavily damaging the other two. Two airplanes were wrecked at the airport. A nearby apartment building was destroyed by the tornado. Six people were injured when their vehicles were blown off of US 63. Along the highway, 49 buildings were damaged or overturned; another three people were injured in this area. Power outages related to the tornado continued into April 13 for much of Texas County. In total, nine people were injured. The damage toll was approximately $2 million.						
F?	W of Bakersfield	Ozark	MO	36.50°N 92.20°W	21:15	3 mi (4.8 km)	100 yd (91 m)
F?	A tornado began near Route 101 along the border between Arkansas and Missouri, damaging a metal building and two farms. The tornado moved northeast towards areas west of Bakersfield, damaging or destroying several homes and uprooting trees. Two people were injured by the tornado.						
F1	N of Levant	Thomas	KS	39.57°N 101.20°W	21:00	—N/a	33 yd (30 m)
F1	A brief tornado occurred over open country without causing damage.						
F1	Mammoth Spring	Fulton	AR	36.50°N 91.55°W	21:45	0.5 mi (0.80 km)	100 yd (91 m)
F1	Several buildings were damaged or destroyed, as were trees and power lines. The damage toll exceeded $20,000.						
F1	W of Beebe	White	AR	35.07°N 91.93°W	21:50	6 mi (9.7 km)	100 yd (91 m)
F1	Several homes were unroofed and outbuildings and farms were damaged.						
F2	NE of Crossett	Ashley	AR	33.15°N 91.95°W	22:10	9.5 mi (15.3 km)	200 yd (180 m)
F2	The business district of Hamburg was impacted by a tornado, resulting in $3.5 million in damage. The tornado was the second to strike Hamburg in three days.						
F2	Clear Springs	Lawrence	AR	36.12°N 91.15°W	22:10	2 mi (3.2 km)	200 yd (180 m)
F2	A rock crushing plant in the Clear Springs community 3 mi (4.8 km) west of Black Rock was damaged by a tornado. Railroad cars with crushed rock were also badly damaged. The cost of damage topped $300,000.						
F2	Masonville	Desha	AR	33.58°N 91.40°W	22:10	3 mi (4.8 km)	100 yd (91 m)
F2	McGehee was hardest hit by the tornado. Several homes and businesses were either destroyed or suffered considerable damage. The damage toll amounted to about $449,000.						
F1	N of Topeka	Shawnee	KS	39.10°N 95.73°W	23:00	3.5 mi (5.6 km)	30 yd (27 m)
F1	A tornado caused damage intermittently along a path north of Topeka, beginning west of Rochester Road near Northwest 35th Street and ending towards the east-northeast near Northwest 62nd Street. Homes, trees, and utility lines were damaged. Two mobile homes were flipped by the tornado; one person sustained minor injuries in a mobile home. The damage was estimated by the Shawnee County civil defense director estimated the damage toll to be in the range of $70,000–$90,000.						
F1	N of Libertyville	Ste. Genevieve	MO	37.72°N 90.30°W	23:30	6 mi (9.7 km)	100 yd (91 m)
F1	Buildings and equipment on two farms were damaged north of Libertyville and in the Coffman area. A few buildings were heavily damaged and partly destroyed.						
F?	W of Ravenna	Buffalo	NE	41.03°N 99.00°W	00:00	0.5 mi (0.80 km)	10 yd (9.1 m)
F?	A tornado damaged equipment on a farm west of Ravenna, resulting in approximately $4,000 in damage.						
F2	Liberty to Kearney to N of Lawson	Clay, Clinton, Ray	MO	39.25°N 94.43°W	01:00	21 mi (34 km)	100 yd (91 m)
F2	A strong tornado began up in Liberty, damaging homes and businesses. The damage was most severe near Route 291, where several businesses were damaged. A mobile home park, church, and elementary school near the intersection of Route 291 with I-35 were also hit. The tornado continued northeast along I-35 into Kearney, where it damaged several homes and businesses. Two barns were also razed. Five people were injured while seeking shelter in a roadside ditch after being struck by the windthrown bus they had evacuated from. Several farms were affected in the Lawson area before the tornado dissipated. In all, nine people were injured.						
F2	Dycusburg to Dixon to Niagara	Crittenden, Webster, Henderson	KY	37.15°N 88.18°W	02:00	40 mi (64 km)	200 yd (180 m)
F2	A tornado struck several communities in western Kentucky, including Shady Grove in Crittenden County; Clay, Dixon, and Poole in Webster County; and Hebbardsville, Niagara, and Robards in Henderson County. Five people were injured in overturned mobile homes in Henderson County.						
F2	E of Evansville to N of Boonville	Vanderburg, Warrick	IN	38.00°N 87.43°W	02:00	—N/a	—N/a
F2	1 death – A tornado began in eastern Evansville, striking a lumber yard and the Plaza East shopping center. The tornado briefly lifted for 5 mi (8.0 km) before impacting a trailer park 2 mi (3.2 km) north of Boonville, killing one person and injuring two others. Debris from the trailer park was scattered over a 400 ft (120 m) area.						
F0	Dickson	Dickson	TN	36.07°N 87.37°W	05:00	0.25 mi (0.40 km)	30 yd (27 m)
F0	Four homes were damaged on the eastern side of Dickson.						
F1	Florence	Lauderdale	AL	34.80°N 87.67°W	05:30	0.5 mi (0.80 km)	20 yd (18 m)
F1	A damaging severe thunderstorm impacted central Lauderdale County, inflicting minor to moderate damage to 200 homes and widespread damage to trees. The worst of the damage occurred in the Seven Points area of Florence. While most of the damage was caused by straight-line winds, one or more small and intermittent tornadoes were embedded within the thunderstorm. Local police reported two tornadoes, with one impacting the Seven Points Shopping Center before midnight, and a second impacting residential areas farther north after midnight; the funnel clouds associated with both tornadoes may have been first sighted south of Florence 15 minutes before reaching the city. The damage toll from the storms in Lauderdale County reached $500,000–$1 million and one person was injured.						

=== April 12 event ===
List of confirmed tornadoes – Thursday, April 12, 1979
F#	Location	County / Parish	State	Start Coord.	Time (UTC)	Path length	Width
F2	Steens	Lowndes	MS	33.53°N 88.40°W	09:00	7.7 mi (12.4 km)	800 yd (730 m)
F2	A tornado began on the outskirts of Steens, in the early morning hours of April 12 and tracked towards the northeast, destroying two mobile homes and damaging 25–30 other homes. The tornado also inflicted considerable damage to 15–20 outbuildings and downed trees and power lines. As much as 80 percent of power lines in Lowndes County, were knocked out of commission.						

=== Vernon, Texas/Davidson, Oklahoma ===
Vernon, Texas/Davidson, Oklahoma
- The tornado as it approached Vernon, Texas.

Meteorological history
- Formed: April 10, 1979, 3:20 p.m. CST (UTC−06:00)
- Dissipated: April 10, 1979, 4:00 p.m. CST (UTC−06:00)
- Duration: 40 minutes

F4 tornado
- on the Fujita scale
- Highest winds: 150–200 mph (240–320 km/h)

Overall effects
- Fatalities: 11
- Injuries: 67
- Damage: $27 million (1979 USD)

The first of three intense and tornadic thunderstorms produced a tornado in southern Foard County, Texas, at 2:05 p.m. CST. While this first tornado was still on the ground, the same thunderstorm produced a second tornado in Foard County, 2 mi (3.2 km) or so north of Thalia, at around 3:20 p.m. CST; the two tornadoes were separated by 1.5 mi (2.4 km) and moved in parallel for 5 mi (8.0 km). The second tornado continued into Wilbarger County, after the first dissipated. It tracked towards the Lockett, area along US 70, damaging farms and homes. Fujita and Wakimoto assessed up to F2-rated tornado damage between Thalia and Lockett. The tornado crossed the highway 1 mi (1.6 km) north of Lockett. One person was killed by the tornado after their vehicle was blown 200 yd (180 m) off US-70 into a pasture.

The tornado then moved northeast towards the Vernon, area. Its large size made identification of its tornadic nature by storm spotters difficult. Tornado sirens were activated shortly before the tornado struck Vernon. The tornado entered Vernon at around 3:45 p.m. CST and moved over southern and eastern parts of the city. Several residential blocks in southern Vernon were destroyed by the tornado, leading to at least three deaths. The damage was especially severe along Gordon and Atlanta streets. In eastern Vernon, the tornado razed several buildings, including the Wilbarger Exhibit Building and a Texas Highway Department warehouse. The tornado then crossed US 287, blowing vehicles off the highway and killing seven people. A total of ten fatalities occurred in Vernon. Fujita and Wakimoto assessed up to low-end F4-rated tornado damage in the Vernon area. The tornado crossed the Pease River outside of Vernon, killing cows along the riverbank, and crossed into Oklahoma near the confluence of the Pease River and Red River with approximately F1 intensity. The tornado passed east-northeast of Davidson, destroying at least three homes and inflicting major damage on another five. One person was injured in Oklahoma after their car was blown by the tornado. Numerous cattle were also killed or injured by the tornado. Fujita and Wakimoto assessed up to F2-rated tornado damage in the Davidson area. The tornado lifted at around 4:00 p.m. CST.

The tornado's path spanned 37–39 mi (60–63 km), with about 26 mi (42 km) in Texas and 11 mi (18 km) in Oklahoma. The tornado's width averaged about 880 yd (800 m). The Institute for Disaster Research conducted aerial surveys of the tornado, rating it an F4 on the Fujita scale based on the resulting damage. The institute estimated that the tornado's maximum winds were 150–200 mph (240–320 km/h) based on the degree to which residences were damaged, the damage to the Texas Highway Department, the destruction of a motel and restaurant along US-287, and the distance over which impacted vehicles were blown by the tornado. The same thunderstorm that produced the Vernon tornado later produced another three tornadoes in Oklahoma.

=== Wichita Falls, Texas/Waurika, Oklahoma ===
Wichita Falls, Texas/Waurika, Oklahoma
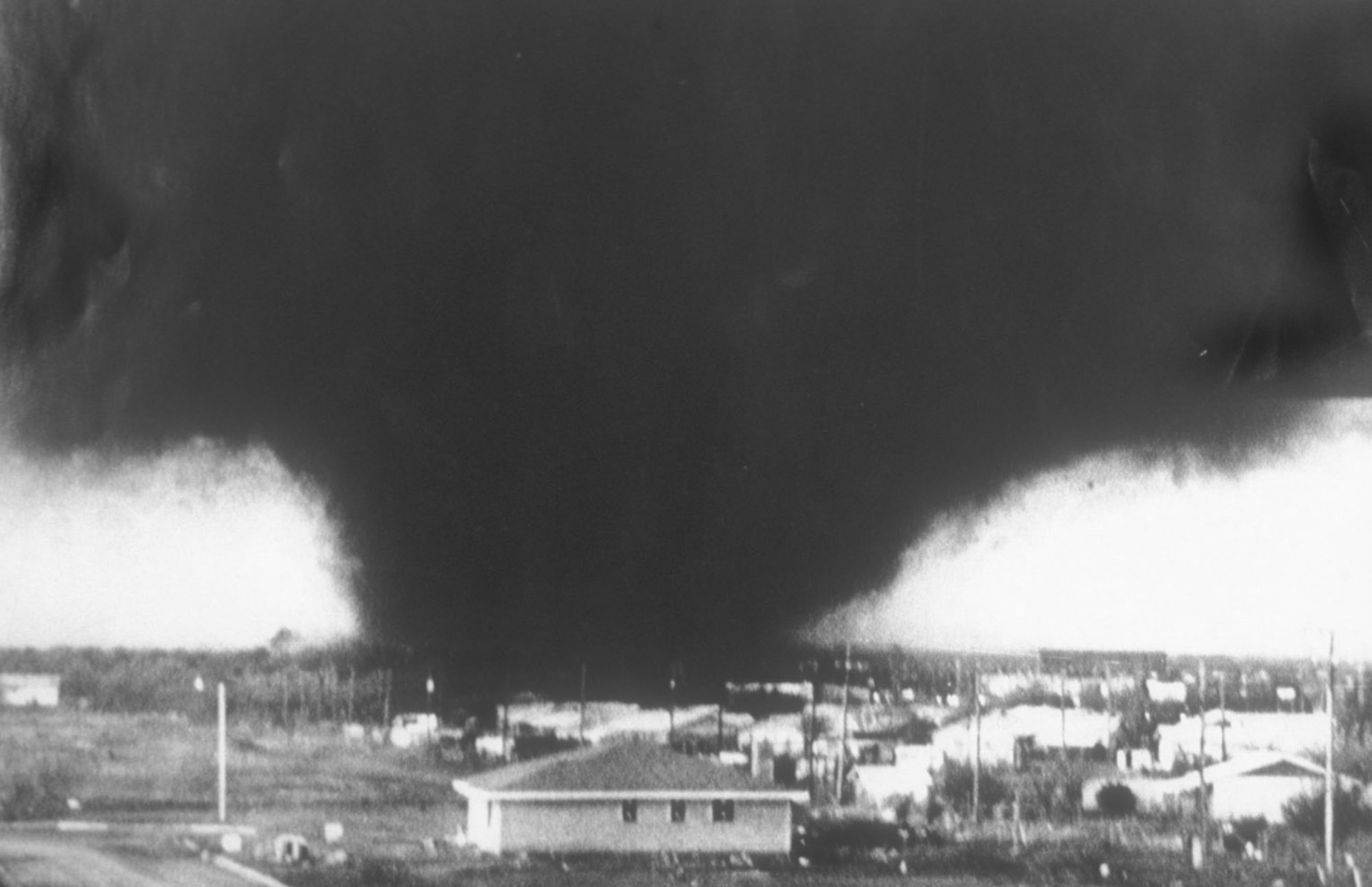
- The tornado at peak intensity in Wichita Falls.

Meteorological history
- Formed: April 10, 1979, 5:50 p.m. CST (UTC−05:00)
- Dissipated: April 10, 1979, 7:00 p.m. CST (UTC−05:00)
- Duration: 1 hour, 10 minutes

F4 tornado
- on the Fujita scale
- Highest winds: ≈225 mph (362 km/h)

Overall effects
- Fatalities: ≥44 (≥41 direct)
- Injuries: 1,740
- Damage: $400 million (1979 USD)

Parts of Wichita Falls, were struck by this violent and horrific tornado on the evening of April 10. The tornado was up to 1.5 mi (2.4 km) wide as it tore through the city, with the swath of particularly intense damage spanning 0.25–0.5 mi (0.40–0.80 km) wide. The tornado swept east-northeastward through a 8 mi (13 km) stretch of residential areas covering 11 mi^{2} (28 km^{2}), directly causing 42 fatalities according to the National Weather Service (NWS); another three people later died of heart attacks. The destruction amounted to $400 million in damage, making the tornado the costliest tornado on record at the time. When normalized for wealth and inflation, the tornado caused approximately $1.14 billion in damage in 1997 United States dollars. Advance notice of the approaching tornado and the awareness of prior tornadoes earlier in the day in nearby Rocky Point and Vernon may have contributed to lowering the ultimate death toll.

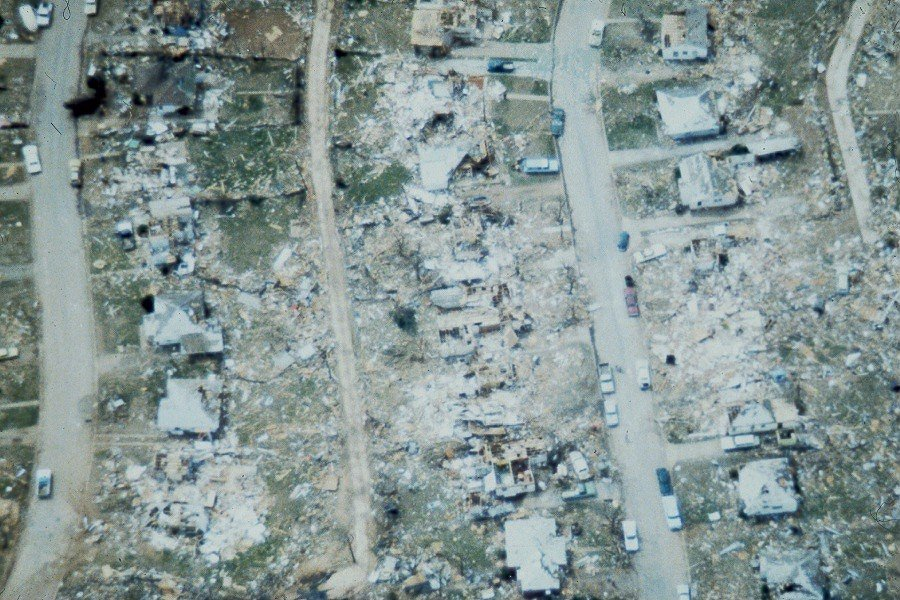
Numerous homes in Wichita Falls were destroyed by the tornado.

At around 5:50 p.m. CST, a tornado developed 3 mi (4.8 km) east-northeast of Holliday, Texas, in Archer County. The tornado moved along the Fort Worth and Denver Railway into Wichita County, blowing away two oil storage tanks and unroofing several homes near FM 2560; the swept oil tanks produced an oil spill. Six high-tension steel electrical transmission towers east of the road were damaged, with three blown prostrate. The tornado darkened and widened to a width of roughly 0.5 mi (0.80 km) across as it moved into Wichita Falls at around 6:15 p.m. CST, rapidly strengthened to high-end F4 intensity and maintained this strength for the next 11 mi (18 km) of its path. The tornado widened to a width of about 1 mi (1.6 km) as it crossed Southwest Parkway into the Faith Village neighborhood, levelling several businesses and tossing vehicles about. Additional homes and a shopping center were razed in the Southmoor subdivision. The tornado then crossed US 281 and moved into the Sun Valley neighborhood along the southern side of US 287, destroying apartments, houses, and businesses. Cars were wrecked on US 287, resulting in a few fatalities. Among the fatalities were some who sought shelter underneath a highway overpass. The Sunnyside Heights mobile home park north of the highway was destroyed, though no fatalities resulted as residents had evacuated.

Fujita and Wakimoto assessed up to F4-rated tornado damage between Wichita Falls and Dean, with F0-rated damage south of Petrolia. The tornado uprooted 200 trees along the Red River as it crossed into Oklahoma around 4 mi (6.4 km) east of Byers at 6:30 p.m. CST. The tornado's path gradually curved towards the left after entering Oklahoma, bringing it to areas southwest of Waurika. The most severe damage inflicted by the tornado in the state occurred alone Noble Wray Road, where 20 homes were destroyed or damaged. The frame of one mobile home was greatly contorted and blown 0.5 mi (0.80 km) away. Fujita and Wakimoto assessed up to F2-level damage southwest of Waurika. The tornado dissipated just before 7:00 p.m. CST north-northeast of Waurika. Widespread F0-intensity damage continued for 30 mi (48 km) past Waurika, though this damage was likely caused by a large downburst rather than a continuation of the tornado. In total, the tornado was on the ground for approximately 70 minutes, with of path 47 mi (76 km) long, including 36 mi (58 km) in Texas and 11 mi (18 km) in Oklahoma. Based on aerial surveys of the damage, the Institute for Disaster Research assessed the tornado as reaching F4 intensity and estimated that the tornado's maximum wind speeds reached 175–225 mph (282–362 km/h).

== Aftermath ==
Within Wichita Falls $63 million in losses were eligible for federal disaster aid. The apparent survivability of small interior rooms despite the widespread destruction of homes and businesses encouraged the development of reinforced safe rooms. The viability of safe rooms and the high number of fatalities among those who fled their homes led to increased emphasis on seeking indoor shelter in tornado preparedness, as opposed to the older idea of opening windows to reduce tornado damage.

April 10, 1979, came to be known as "Terrible Tuesday" in the areas affected by the tornadoes along the Oklahoma–Texas border. In 1984, the NWS produced a documentary covering the Wichita Falls tornado, titled Terrible Tuesday, in collaboration with the American Red Cross and FEMA. One Wichita Falls park features a plaque with the names of the 45 people who died during and after the Wichita Falls tornado, with a tree dedicated to each of the victims. Another park near the downtown area bears crape myrtle sculptures symbolizing the city's recovery.

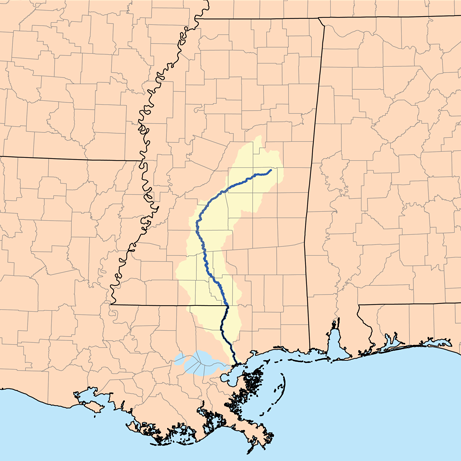
Map showing the Pearl River in Mississippi.

The same storm system subsequently caused flooding in Mississippi, known as the 1979 Easter flood was one of the most costly and devastating floods to ever occur in Mississippi, United States, with $500–700 million in damages ($2.22 billion in 2020 dollars). It was the result of the Pearl River being overwhelmed by severe rain upstream. Floodwaters sent the Pearl River 15 feet above flood stage. More than 17,000 residents of Jackson, Flowood, Pearl, Richland, and other settlements in the Jackson metropolitan area were forced from their homes. The flooding of the Pearl River placed most of the streets of Jackson, the state's capital city, under several feet of water. This flood resulted from the same storm system that, just a few days earlier, produced the Red River valley tornado outbreak that is particularly well-known because of the devastating Wichita Falls, Texas tornado that killed 42, injured over 1,700, left an estimated 20,000 homeless, and caused, in 1979 dollars, approximately $400 million in damages.

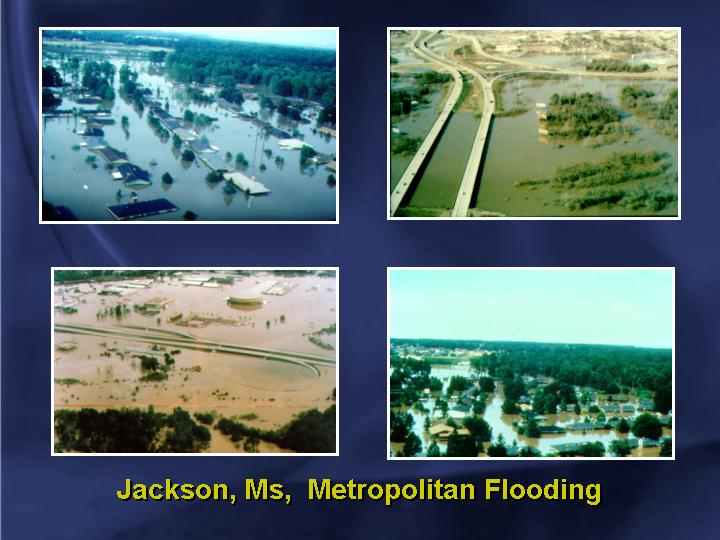

Flood stage at Jackson in 1979 was considered to be 18 feet (relative to the gauge datum on Pearl River), but as of 2004, this stage was set as 28 feet.

== See also ==
- List of North American tornadoes and tornado outbreaks
- List of F4 and EF4 tornadoes

== Notes ==
Preceded by Omaha, NE (1975)	Costliest U.S. tornadoes on record April 10, 1979	Succeeded by Bridge Creek, Moore, & Oklahoma City (Metro), OK (1999)
