= 1979 Wichita Falls tornado =

1979 F4 tornado in Texas, U.S

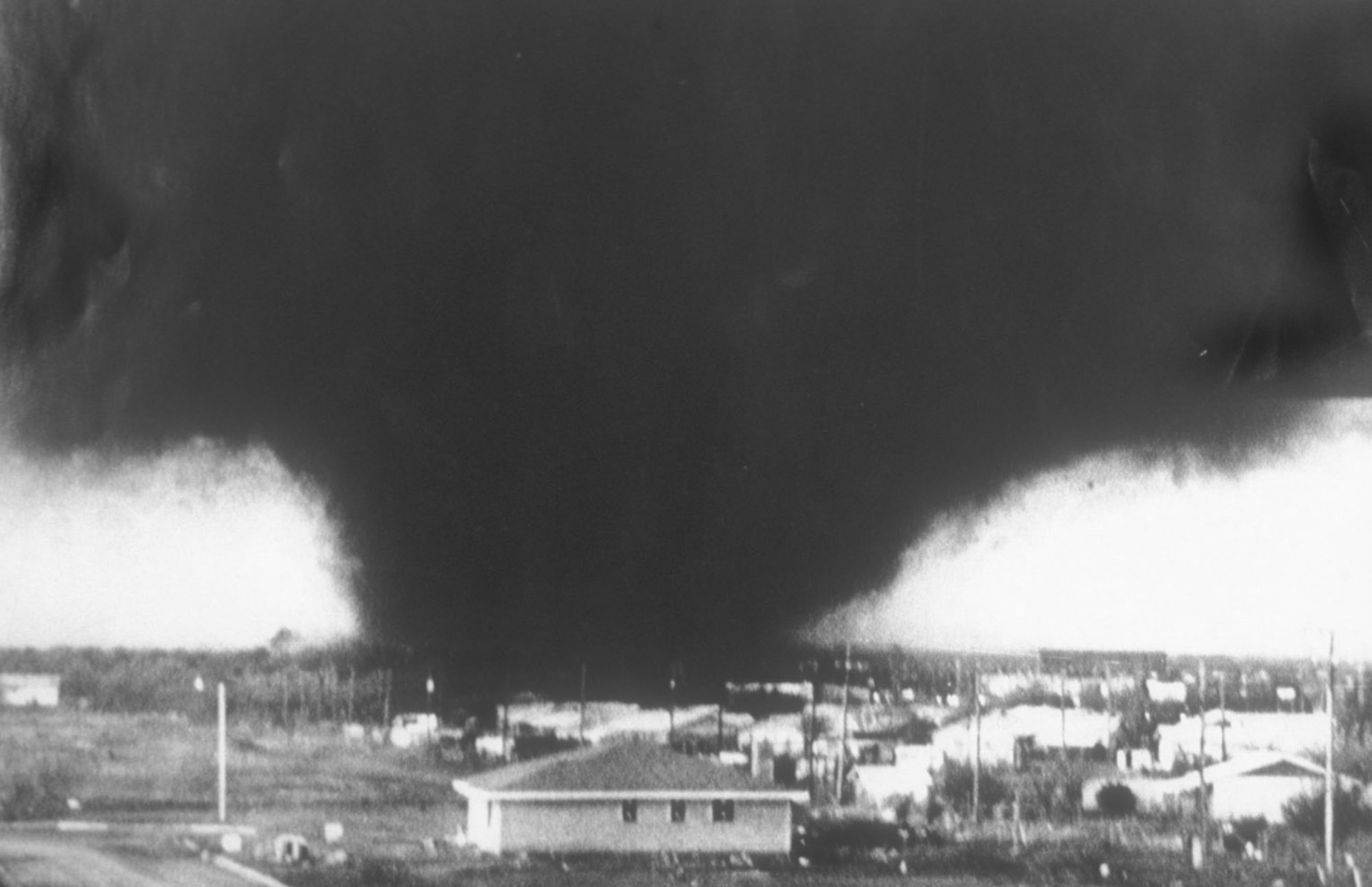
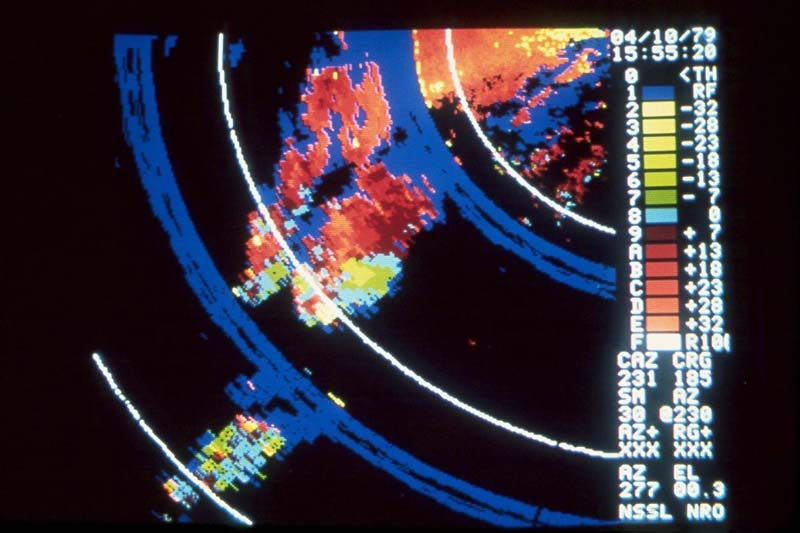
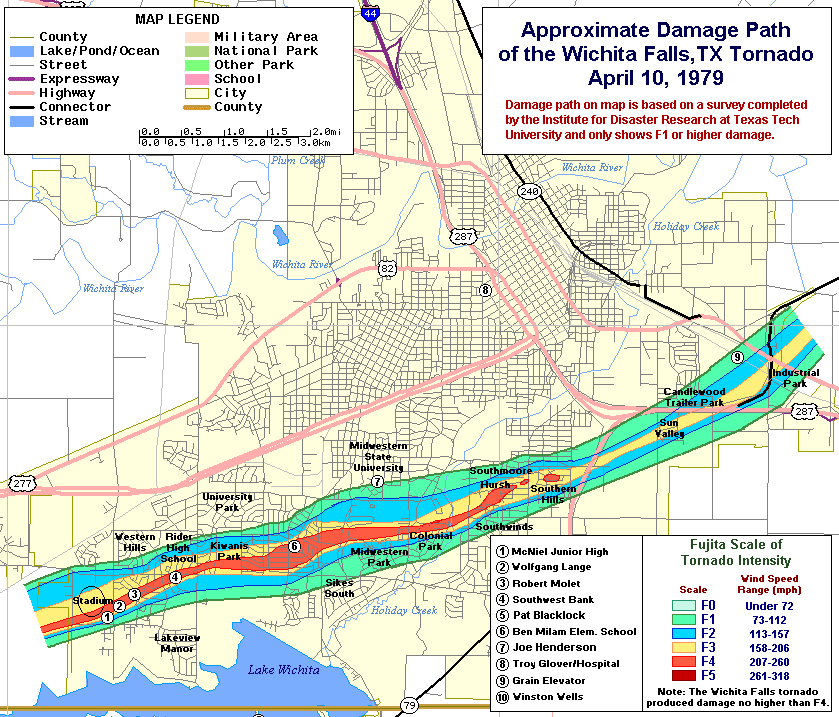
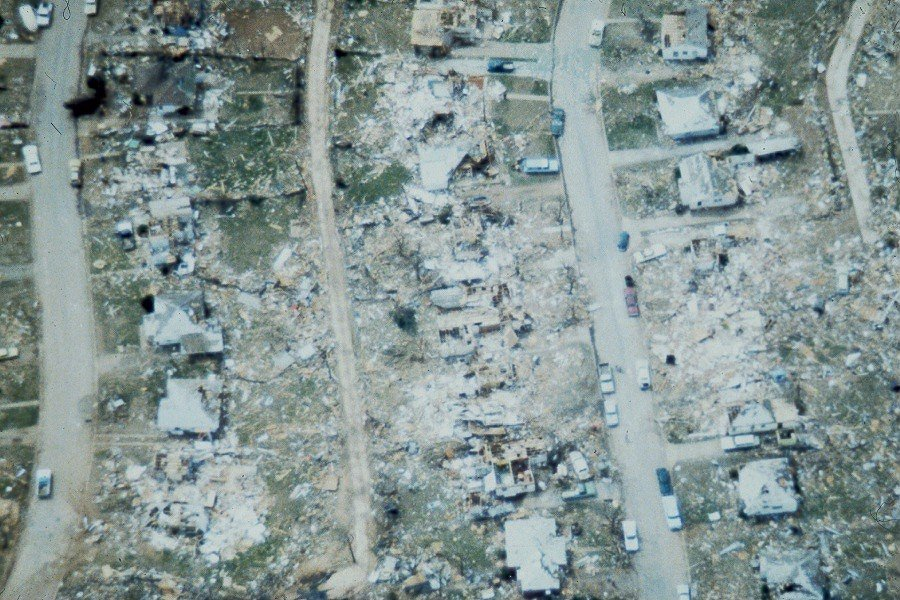
- Clockwise from top: The tornado at peak intensity in Wichita Falls; track of the tornado through the southern portions of Wichita Falls with associated damage path; homes flattened by the tornado; NEXRAD radar velocity imagery of the supercell that produced the tornado

Meteorological history
- Formed: April 10, 1979, 5:50 p.m. CST (UTC−05:00)
- Dissipated: April 10, 1979, 7:00 p.m. CST (UTC−05:00)
- Duration: 1 hour, 10 minutes

F4 tornado
- on the Fujita scale
- Max width: 2,640 yd (1.50 mi; 2.41 km)
- Path length: 47 mi (76 km)
- Highest winds: ≈225 mph (362 km/h)

Overall effects
- Fatalities: ≥44 (≥41 direct)
- Injuries: 1,740
- Damage: $400 million (1979 USD)
- Areas affected: Archer and Clay Counties in Texas, especially the city of Wichita Falls
- Part of the 1979 Red River Valley tornado outbreak and tornadoes of 1979

During the evening hours of Tuesday, April 10, 1979, a violent and deadly F4 tornado struck parts of Wichita Falls, Texas, causing catastrophic impacts to the city. The tornado, mononymously referred to as simply the Wichita Falls tornado, was up to 1.5 mi (2.4 km) wide as it tore through the city, with the swath of particularly intense damage spanning 0.25–0.5 mi (0.40–0.80 km) wide. The tornado was part of a larger tornado outbreak across the Red River Valley that spawned multiple deadly intense-to-violent tornadoes that day.

The Wichita Falls tornado formed in Archer County and moved northeast and damaged a few rural homes and high voltage towers at F1-F2 intensity. It rapidly intensified to F4 intensity as it entered the city near Memorial Stadium by McNiel Jr. High School on Southwest Parkway, which was located to the west of Wichita Falls at approximately 6:07 p.m., damaging both structures severely. Hail the size of golf balls preceded the touchdown and continued for approximately 15 minutes. It then became calm before the winds began to pick up. Continuing at F4 intensity, the now massive wedge tornado, which was at its maximum 1.5 miles (2.4 km) wide, cut a 2.5-mile (4.0 km) swath of destruction through the south side of town. It first destroyed an apartment complex, where the first fatalities took place, as it moved along Southwest Parkway. The tornado then weakened slightly afterwards, but remained at F3 intensity, destroying the Sun Valley housing area, the Sunnyside Heights Mobile Home Park, and several large commercial businesses, including the Levi Strauss Plant, before exiting the east side of town. It then moved into Clay County and changed its appearance to display a multiple-vortex structure. There were at times five separate vortices visible within the tornado. It inflicted additional F0-F2 damage south of Dean and Byers, but no more fatalities occurred. Crossing into Oklahoma, the tornado inflicted additional damage near Waurika before dissipating.

The tornado swept east-northeastward through a 8 mi (13 km) stretch of residential areas covering 11 mi^{2} (28 km^{2}), directly causing 42 fatalities according to the National Weather Service (NWS); another three people later died of heart attacks. Vehicles were thrown as far as 200 yd (180 m) away by the tornado. The destruction amounted to $400 million in damage, making the tornado the costliest tornado on record at the time. When normalized for wealth and inflation, the tornado caused approximately $1.14 billion in damage in 1997 United States dollars. Advance notice of the approaching tornado and the awareness of prior tornadoes earlier in the day in nearby Rocky Point and Vernon may have contributed to lowering the ultimate death toll.

== Meteorological synopsis ==
=== Setup ===
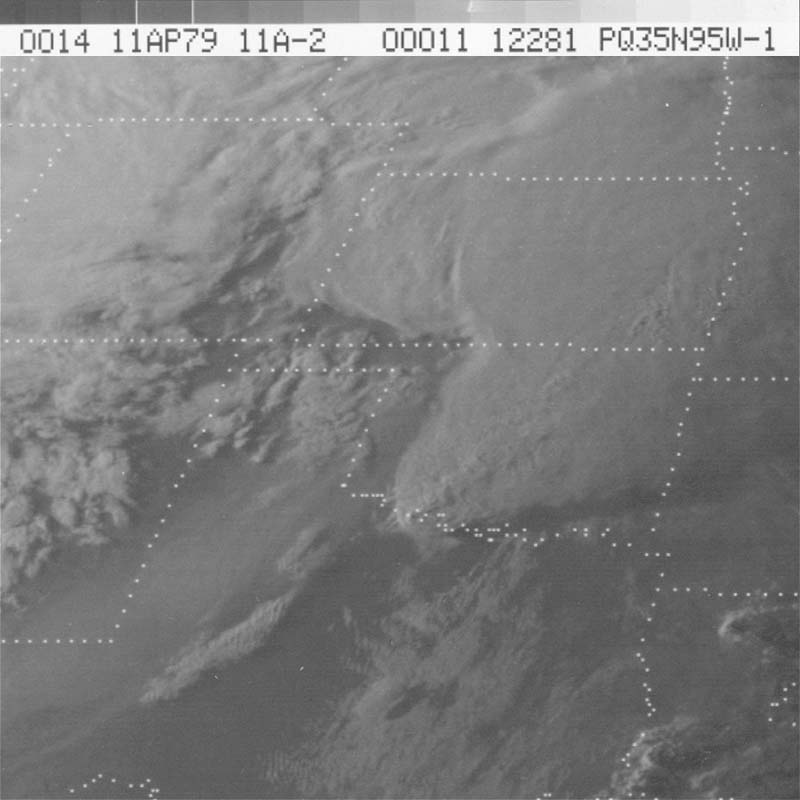
GOES-3 satellite image showing storms over the Red River Valley on the evening of April 10

On April 10, 1979, a low level jet with winds of 20 m/s (45 mph; 72 km/h) materialized over north-central Texas in response to the approach of the jet streak higher aloft, accelerating the transport of heat and moisture northward into the Red River Valley. Thunderstorms developed near Lubbock and moved east-northeastward into a region of high potential instability near the Red River, becoming the strongest thunderstorms of the day. In particular, three isolated supercell thunderstorms caused the majority of the severe weather during the afternoon and evening of April 10; all developed in the localized area of supportive conditions near the frontal intersection. The first thunderstorm formed around 1:00 p.m. CST spawned five tornadoes between 3:05 p.m. CST and 5:15 p.m. CST, including an F4-rated tornado that struck Vernon, Texas, and an F3-rated tornado that struck Lawton, Oklahoma. The second thunderstorm formed around 2:30 p.m. CST, while the third formed around 4:30 p.m. CST. The second supercell produced a tornado that began at 3:55 p.m. and took 64 mi (103 km) long track – the longest track of any tornado during the event – through primarily rural areas near Harrold, Texas and Grandfield, Oklahoma. The most damaging tornado, associated with the third supercell, began at around 5:55 p.m. CST and struck Wichita Falls, Texas. These storms persisted into nighttime over central and eastern Oklahoma. The breakout of severe weather and tornadoes associated with the thunderstorms near the Red River during the afternoon and evening of April 10 was collectively termed the "Red River Valley outbreak" or the "Red River Valley tornado outbreak" by scientists studying the event. At least 12 tornadoes occurred within 47 mi (75 km) of Wichita Falls in a single two-hour period. The last tornado that occurred in the Red River Valley occurred around 8:00 p.m. CST in connection with the third supercell near Pruitt City, Oklahoma. The thunderstorms that produced the tornadoes in the Red River Valley continued into Arkansas and southern Missouri during the overnight hours but did not produce severe weather.

== Tornado summary ==
=== Preceding supercell ===
The thunderstorm that eventually produced the Wichita Falls tornado formed north of Abilene and generally moved towards the northeast. Weather radar observed reflectivity values exceeded 50 dBZ throughout the storm's lifetime, with the radar signal routinely exceeding 50,000 ft (15,000 m) above the surface; satellite observations suggested cloud top heights reaching as high as 9.7 mi (15.6 km). The thunderstorm produced an F2 tornado earlier in the day in Baylor County, and hail up to 3 in (76 mm) in diameter in Archer, Baylor, Wichita, and Wilbarger counties. Another thunderstorm produced a tornado in Wichita County about 12 mi (19 km) west-southwest of Iowa Park. The Wichita Falls weather service office issued a tornado warning for Wichita County at 5:08 p.m. in response to sightings of this tornado, and tornado sirens were sounded in Wichita Falls at 5:25 p.m. The first thunderstorm eventually approached Wichita County, prompting a severe thunderstorm warning for the county at 5:45 p.m. CST. Two mesoscyclones within the thunderstorm were apparent on radar, including one associated with the earlier tornado in Baylor County.

=== Formation, track into Wichita Falls and peak intensity ===
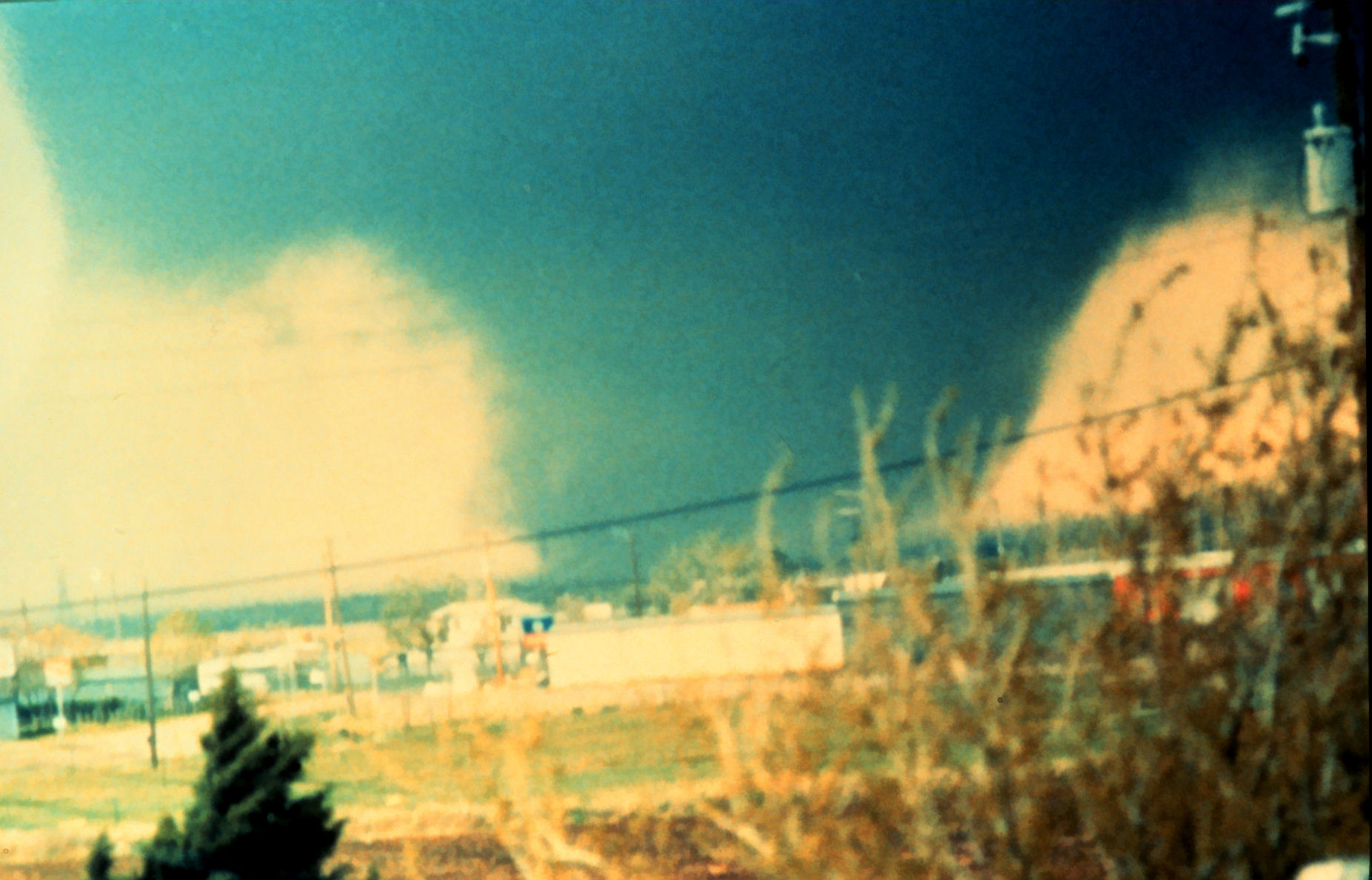
Another photograph of the tornado as it was impacting Wichita Falls

At around 5:50 p.m. CST, a tornado developed in connection with the second mesocyclone on the southwestern flanks of the thunderstorm 3 mi (4.8 km) east-northeast of Holliday, Texas, in Archer County. Witnesses observed smaller vortices embedded in the broader tornadic circulation as it developed, highlighting the multiple-vortex nature of the tornado; the individual vorticies coalesced as the tornado approached Wichita Falls. Evidence of a tornado first became apparent on weather radar at 5:58 p.m. CST, while the tornado was about 10 mi (16 km) southwest of the center of Wichita Falls. The initial reports of the tornado by amateur storm spotters provided residents of Wichita Falls with about 5–10 minutes of notice before the tornado's eventual arrival. The Wichita Falls weather service office issued a tornado warning for Wichita County at 6:00 p.m. CST, just as the first tornado warning expired, warning of the approach of this new tornado. The tornado moved along the Fort Worth and Denver Railway into Wichita County, blowing away two oil storage tanks and unroofing several homes near FM 2560; the swept oil tanks produced an oil spill. Six high-tension steel electrical transmission towers east of the road were damaged, with three blown prostrate. The tornado darkened and widened to a width of roughly 0.5 mi (0.80 km) across as it moved into Wichita Falls at around 6:15 p.m. CST, impacting Memorial Stadium. The stadium field house was heavily damaged and stadium lighting was snapped. As the tornado passed just south of the stadium, it rapidly strengthened to high-end F4 intensity and maintained this strength for the next 11 mi (18 km) of its path. The tornado then caused the collapse of the western half of McNiel Junior High School; the school was largely unoccupied when the tornado struck. After striking the stadium, the tornado began to move through heavily populated residential areas. The Western Hills neighborhood south of Southwest Parkway was struck next, resulting in the first fatalities caused by the tornado. Numerous homes and several apartment complexes were destroyed in the neighborhood.

=== Faith Village ===
The tornado widened to a width of about 1 mi (1.6 km) as it crossed Southwest Parkway into the Faith Village neighborhood, levelling several businesses and tossing vehicles about. The Southwest National Bank Building was levelled with the exception of its vault. The tornado destroyed most homes in Faith Village. Small interior rooms in most of the destroyed homes remained intact, resulting in relatively few fatalities despite the severity of destruction. The cafeteria auditorium and exterior classrooms at Ben Milam Elementary School sustained heavy damage. The tornado proceeded to raze businesses along Kemp Boulevard, including a restaurant where three people were killed. The northern periphery of the tornado struck the Sikes Senter shopping mall, causing the partial collapse of a JCPenney store and inflicting light to moderate damage to other stores in the mall. Several of the roughly 1,000 shoppers in the mall suffered major injuries. The tornadic winds heaped cars in the shopping mall's parking lot atop one another or blew them away. Several people were killed or injured in the parking lot, including some who had fled from the mall to their cars. A church 0.5 mi (0.80 km) south of the mall was flattened, resulting in one fatality. The tornado entered the Colonial Park neighborhood after traversing a greenbelt and clipping the southern side of Midwestern State University, destroying many homes and apartment complexes in Colonial Park. The second stories of apartment buildings saw particularly severe damage. Additional homes and a shopping center were razed in the Southmoor subdivision. The tornado then crossed US 281 and moved into the Sun Valley neighborhood along the southern side of US 287, destroying apartments, houses, and businesses. Cars were wrecked on US 287, resulting in a few fatalities. Among the fatalities were some who sought shelter underneath a highway overpass. The Sunnyside Heights mobile home park north of the highway was destroyed, though no fatalities resulted as residents had evacuated.

=== Clay County, crossing the Red River and dissipation ===
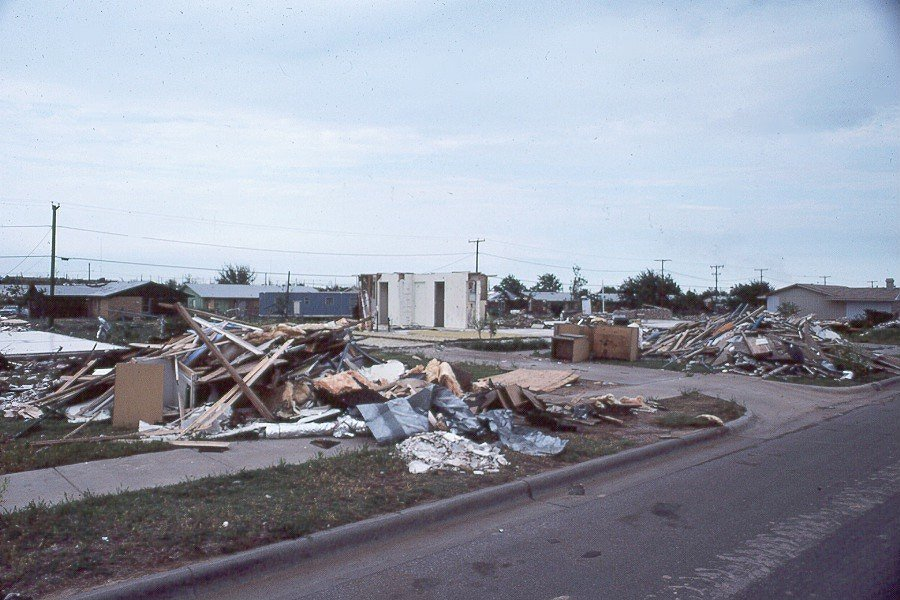
Damage in Wichita Falls

Industrial plants were subsequently destroyed, including a Levi Strauss & Co. manufacturing plant, as the tornado moved into Clay County south of SH 79. The Wichita Falls weather service office issued a tornado warning for Clay County at 6:11 p.m. CST shortly before the office lost power. Homes were destroyed by the tornado south of TX-79 along a path from Wichita Falls to Dean, and Petrolia, contributing to the $15 million damage toll wrought by the tornado in Clay County. Forty people were injured in the county. Fujita and Wakimoto assessed up to F4-rated tornado damage between Wichita Falls and Dean, with F0-rated damage south of Petrolia. The tornado uprooted 200 trees along the Red River as it crossed into Oklahoma around 4 mi (6.4 km) east of Byers at 6:30 p.m. CST. The tornado's path gradually curved towards the left after entering Oklahoma, bringing it to areas southwest of Waurika. The most severe damage inflicted by the tornado in the state occurred alone Noble Wray Road, where 20 homes were destroyed or damaged. The frame of one mobile home was greatly contorted and blown 0.5 mi (0.80 km) away. Fujita and Wakimoto assessed up to F2-level damage southwest of Waurika. The tornado dissipated just before 7:00 p.m. CST north-northeast of Waurika. Widespread F0-intensity damage continued for 30 mi (48 km) past Waurika, though this damage was likely caused by a large downburst rather than a continuation of the tornado.

=== Analysis ===
In total, the tornado was on the ground for approximately 70 minutes, with of path 47 mi (76 km) long, including 36 mi (58 km) in Texas and 11 mi (18 km) in Oklahoma. Based on aerial surveys of the damage, the Institute for Disaster Research assessed the tornado as reaching F4 intensity and estimated that the tornado's maximum wind speeds reached 175–225 mph (282–362 km/h). The most extreme damage wrought by the tornado occurred at McNiel Junior High School and Southwest National Bank. Later engineering analysis of the higher-end damage suggested winds consistent with that of a strong F4 tornado, though there was ample preceding scientific discussion concerning whether or not the extreme damage could be graded as F5-intensity damage. Unlike most tornadoes, the corridor of strongest winds associated with the Wichita Falls tornado was unusually wide; the swath of F4-severity damage was nearly 0.5 mi (0.80 km) across in vicinity of Ben Milam Elementary School and the Faith Village neighborhood. The thunderstorm that produced the Wichita Falls tornado also dropped hail up to 2 in (51 mm) diameter in Wichita Falls north of the tornado path. Survivors of the tornado also observed hail the size of golf balls immediately preceding and following passage of the tornado. The broader winds associated with the mesocyclone that spawned the Wichita Falls tornado caused light damage throughout much of the city.

== Aftermath ==
=== Recovery efforts ===
Within Wichita Falls $63 million in losses were eligible for federal disaster aid. The apparent survivability of small interior rooms despite the widespread destruction of homes and businesses encouraged the development of reinforced safe rooms. The viability of safe rooms and the high number of fatalities among those who fled their homes led to increased emphasis on seeking indoor shelter in tornado preparedness, as opposed to the older idea of opening windows to reduce tornado damage.

=== Death toll uncertainty ===
A survey by the Center for Disease Control enumerated 44 fatalities and 171 injuries requiring hospitalization, while a later study published in Science in February 1980 enumerated 45 deaths from traumatic injuries inflicted by the tornado, 1 from sepsis, and 1 from tetanus. Of the fatalities, 25 were vehicle-related deaths; 11 people died while attempting to evade the tornado in their vehicles after fleeing their otherwise undamaged homes. Only five deaths occurred indoors. Around 1,700 people sustained injuries in Wichita Falls, including 59 with serious injuries. Numerous residences were destroyed in the city, including 2,095 homes, 1,062 apartment units and 93 mobile homes. Over 3,000 homes left uninhabitable by the tornado. The widespread devastation left approximately 20,000 people from 5,000 families homeless, accounting for about 10–20% of the city's population.

=== Other tornadoes ===
The Wichita Falls tornado was produced by a supercell that produced two other tornadoes, one of which was unofficially touched down as the main F4 was ongoing:

List of confirmed tornadoes – Tuesday, April 10, 1979 (Note: All dates are based on the local time zone where the tornado began; however, all times are in Coordinated Universal Time for consistency.)
F#	Location	County / Parish	State	Start Coord. (Note: All starting coordinates are based on the National Centers for Environmental Information (NCEI) Storm Events database and may not reflect contemporary analyses.)	Time (UTC) (Note: Times as listed in Storm Data unless otherwise noted.)	Path length (Note: Path lengths as listed in Storm Data unless otherwise noted.)	Width (Note: Widths as listed in Storm Data unless otherwise noted. The listed width values are primarily the average/mean width of the tornadoes. From 1952 to 1994, reports largely list mean width whereas contemporary years list maximum width.)
F2	NW of Seymour to NNE of Mabelle	Baylor	TX	33.62°N 99.30°W	22:49–23:12	11 mi (18 km)	300 yd (270 m)
F2	A tornado touched down intermittently in the Seymour area, leading to scattered roof damage. The tornado strengthened as it moved northeast away from Seymour and into rural areas. Most of the tornado path was over open country, impacting various outbuildings. Telephone poles were downed by the tornado along US 283. The tornado was targeted by the University of Oklahoma's Severe Storms Intercept Project—1979, which was intended to supplement the concurrent SESAME field campaign through visual observation and documentation of severe storms. Footage was captured of the Seymour tornado's developmental and mature stages. The intercept team conducted a survey of the tornado path, documenting a segment of denuded tree branch that was lodged 18 cm (7.1 in) into the ground and mesquite pulled from the ground by the tornado. The thunderstorm that produced the Seymour tornado later spawned the violent tornado that hit Wichita Falls.						
F1	Wichita Falls	Wichita	TX	33.90°N 98.50°W	00:00	2 mi (3.2 km)	50 yd (46 m)
F1	A small tornado caused intermittent damage in northwestern Wichita Falls while the primary Wichita Falls tornado was impacting southern parts of the city. Witnesses described the tornado as bearing a small funnel cloud without condensation reaching the surface. Several structures were damaged, including a home and several outbuildings. A drive-in theater screen was also downed by the tornado. The damage was initially assessed as being caused by straight-line thunderstorm winds.						

== See also ==
- List of F4 and EF4 tornadoes
- 1999 Bridge Creek–Moore tornado
- Joplin tornado

== Notes ==
Preceded by Omaha, NE (1975)	Costliest U.S. tornadoes on record April 10, 1979	Succeeded by Bridge Creek, Moore, & Oklahoma City (Metro), OK (1999)
