= Tornadoes of 1979 =

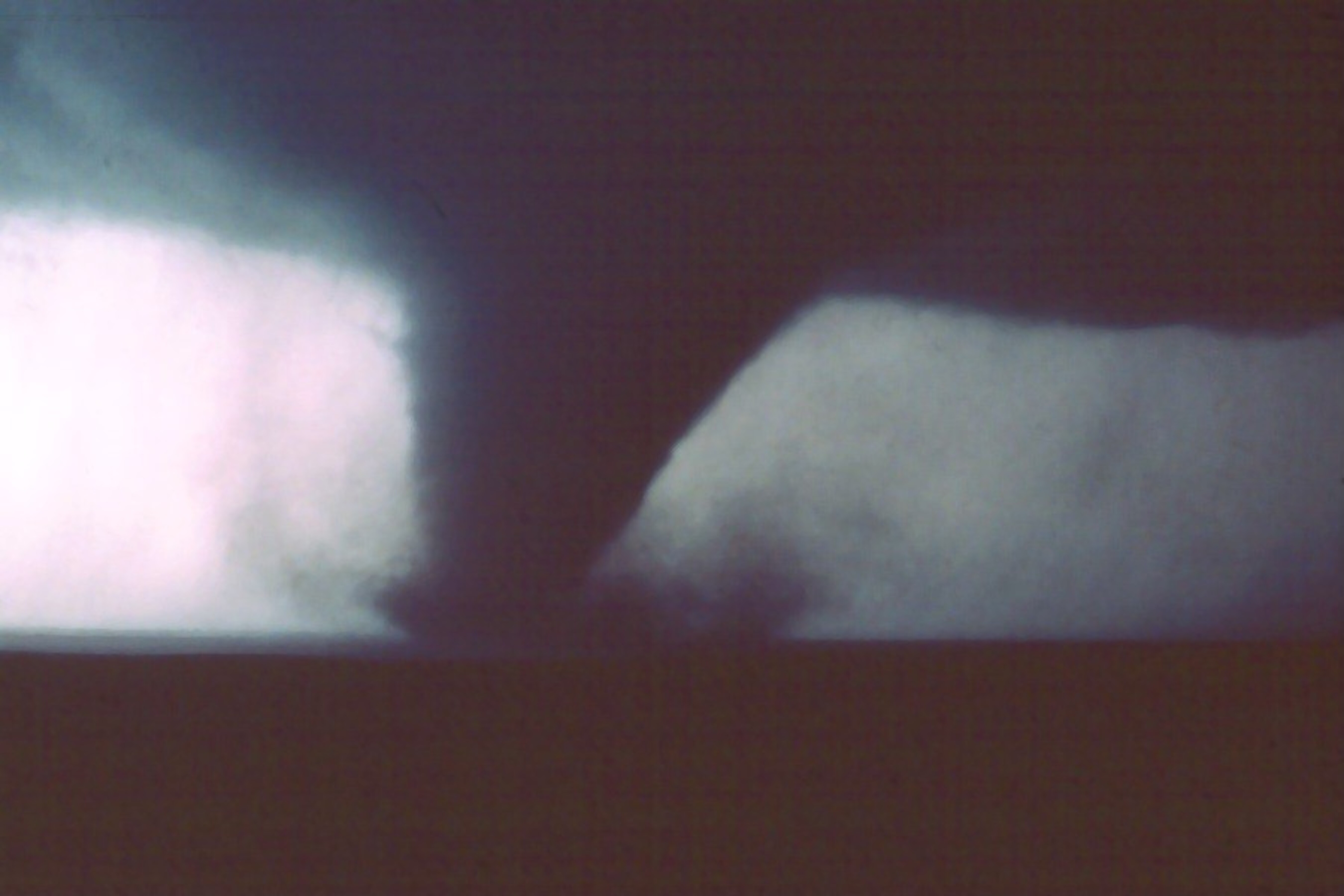
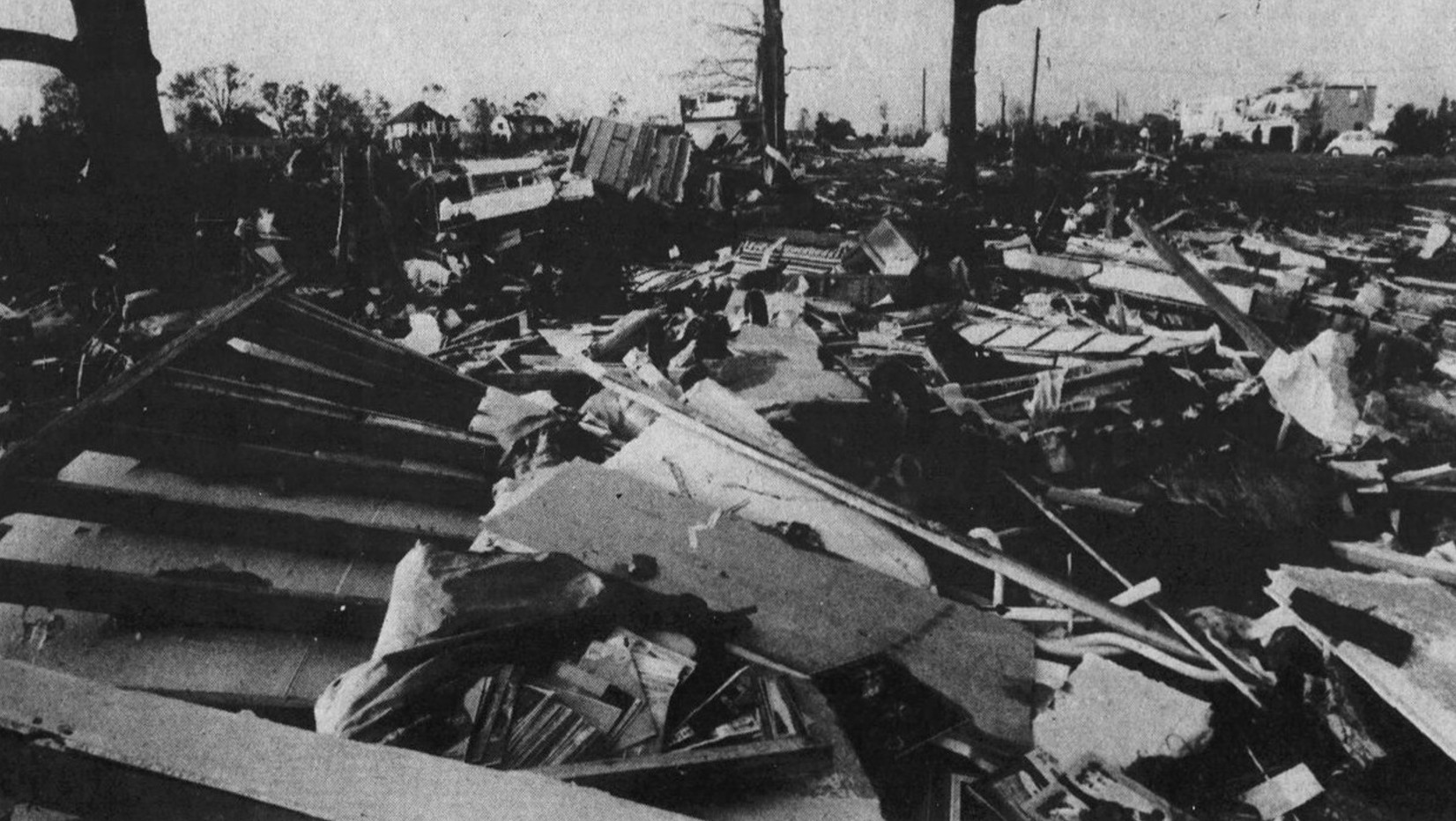
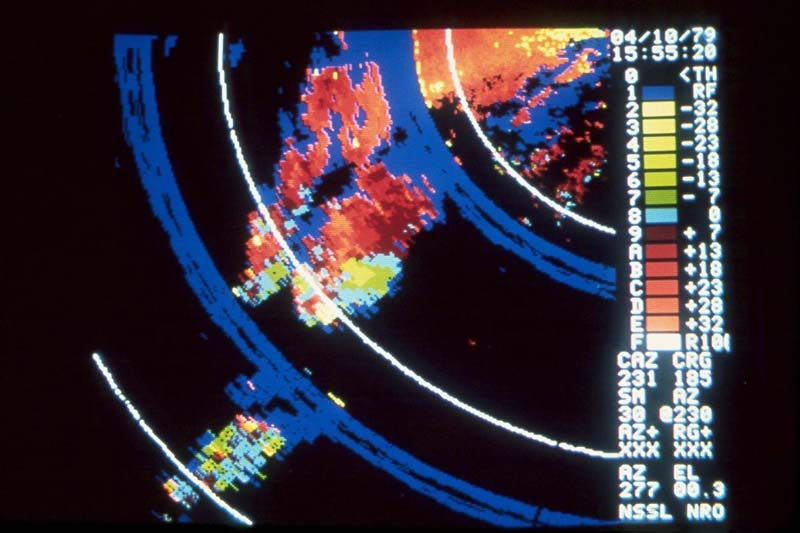
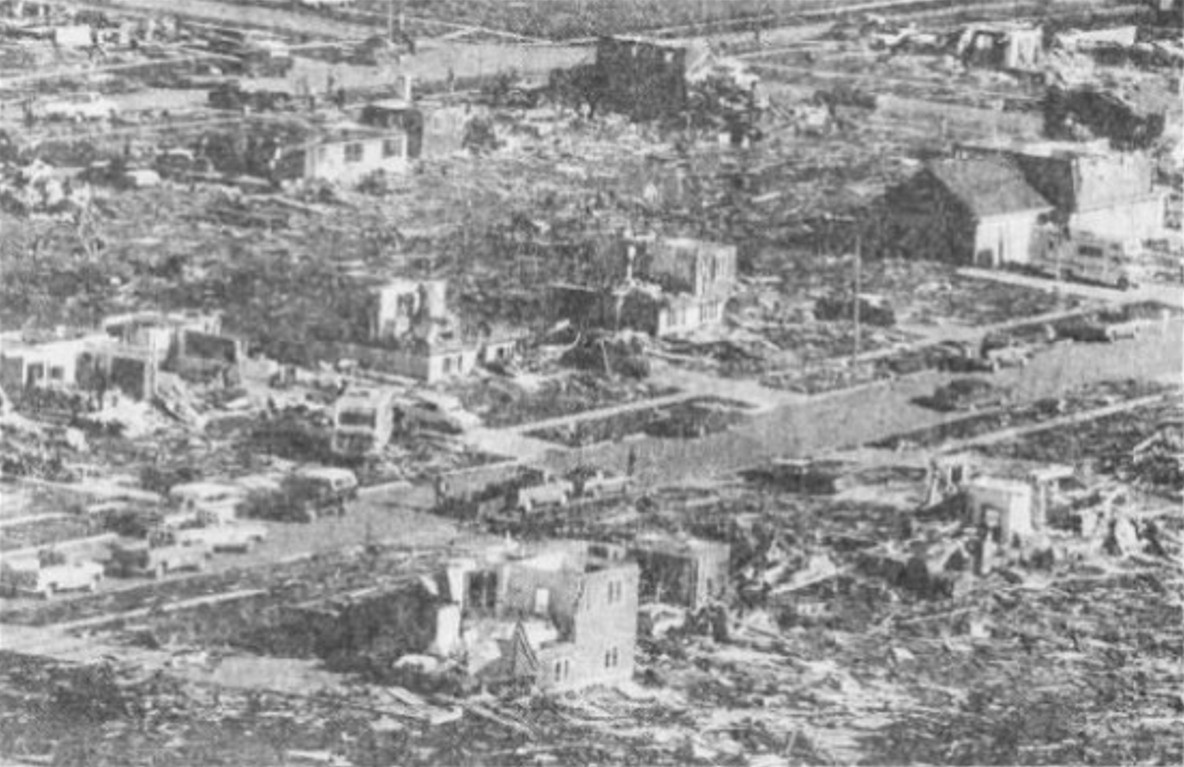
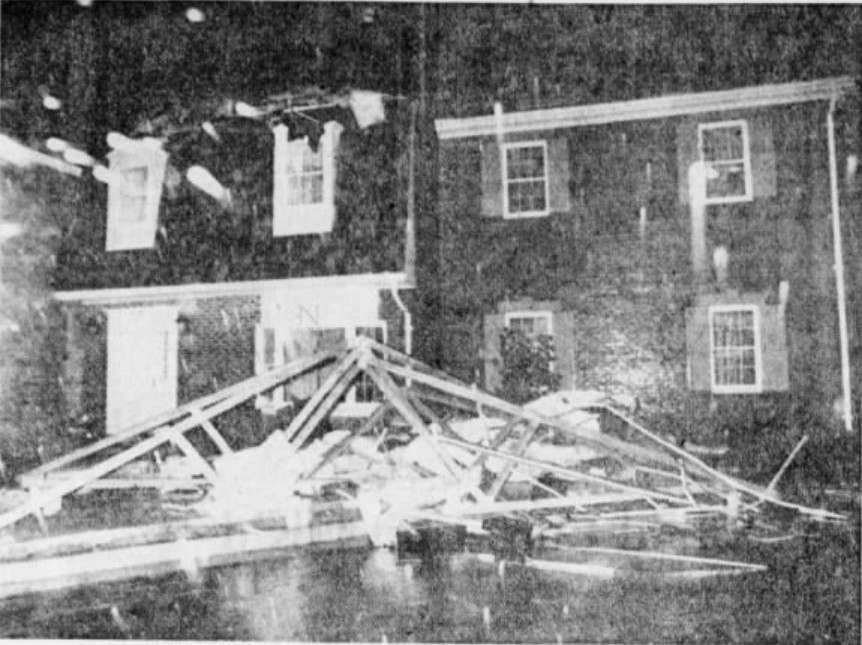
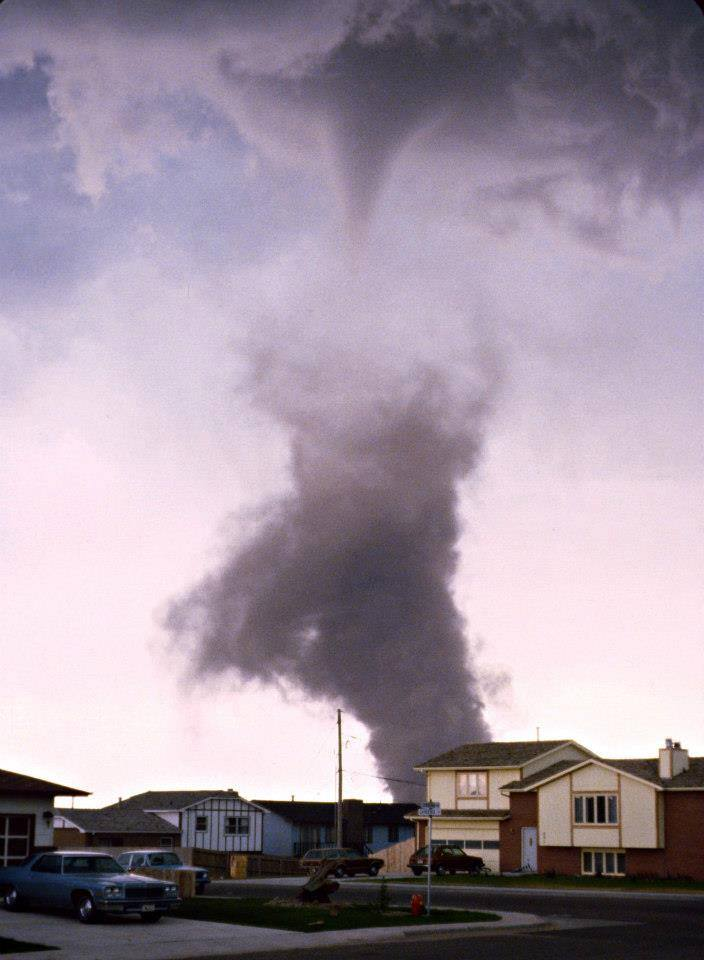
- Clockwise from top: An F2 tornado near Seymour, Texas on April 10; A radar velocity signature of an F4 tornado near Wichita Falls, Texas on April 10; Damage to a home in Fairfax, Virginia after a tornado on September 5; A thin F3 tornado in Cheyenne, Wyoming on July 16; An aerial view of Algona, Iowa after an F3 tornado on June 28; Damage to homes in Windsor Locks, Connecticut after an F4 tornado on October 3.
- Timespan: January 1 - December 23, 1979
Maximum rated tornado
F4 tornado
- List
  – Braddyville, Iowa
  on March 29
  – Vernon, Texas
  on April 10
  – Wichita Falls, Texas
  on April 10
  – Ringwood, Oklahoma
  on May 2
  – Bad Liebenwerda, Germany
  on May 24
  – Manson, Iowa
  on June 28
  – Joliet, Illinois
  on June 29
  – Changzhou, China
  on July 21
  – East Zorra-Tavistock, Ontario
  on August 7
  – Woodstock, Ontario
  on August 7
  – Windsor Locks, Connecticut
  on October 3
  – Villas Ciudad de América, Argentina
  on December 11
- Tornadoes in U.S.: 856
- Damage (U.S.): Unknown
- Fatalities (U.S.): 84
- Fatalities (worldwide): >84

This page documents the tornadoes and tornado outbreaks of 1979, primarily in the United States. Most tornadoes form in the U.S., although some events may take place internationally. Tornado statistics for older years like this often appear significantly lower than modern years due to fewer reports or confirmed tornadoes.

== Synopsis ==
Fatal United States tornadoes in 1979
- Approximate touchdown location of killer tornadoes in 1979
Summary of tornadoes
- March 31 – Kentucky (1 death)
- April 10 – Texas, Oklahoma (11 deaths)
- April 10 – Texas, Oklahoma (1 death)
- April 10 – Oklahoma (3 deaths)
- April 10 – Texas, Oklahoma (42 deaths)
- April 11 – Indiana (1 death)
- May 2 – Oklahoma (1 death)
- May 8 – Florida (1 death)
- June 19 – South Dakota (1 death)
- June 28 – Iowa (2 deaths)
- June 28 – Iowa (3 deaths)
- June 30 – Tennessee (2 deaths)
- July 16 – Wyoming (1 death)
- August 9 – Wisconsin (1 death)
- August 10 – Massachusetts (2 deaths)
- August 28 – Iowa (2 deaths)
- September 5 – Virginia (1 death)
- September 5 – Pennsylvania (1 death)
- October 3 – Connecticut (3 deaths)
- October 22 – Arkansas (1 death)
- October 30 – Oklahoma (3 deaths)
Total fatalities: 84

Numbers for 1979 were similar to that of 1980. Deaths were near normal, but injuries were above normal.

== Events ==
Confirmed tornadoes by Fujita rating
FU	F0	F1	F2	F3	F4	F5	Total
38	349	318	116	28	7	0	856

== January ==
16 tornadoes were reported in the U.S. in January, of which all were confirmed.

== February ==
4 tornadoes were reported in the U.S. in February, of which all were confirmed.

== March ==
53 tornadoes were reported in the U.S. in March.

=== March 18 ===
FU	F0	F1	F2	F3	F4	F5
0	4	5	2	1	0	0

On March 18, a minor outbreak swept across Texas, Oklahoma, and Kansas. The strongest tornado was an F3 that struck Copan, Oklahoma. An F2 tornado hit Catoosa, Oklahoma, a suburb of Tulsa.

=== March 29 ===
FU	F0	F1	F2	F3	F4	F5
0	3	1	2	2	1	0

On March 29, tornadoes touched down across Iowa and Illinois, including an F4 tornado that hit Braddyville, Iowa. An F0 struck a small suburb of Denver.

== April ==
123 tornadoes were reported in the U.S. in April.

=== April 10–12 ===
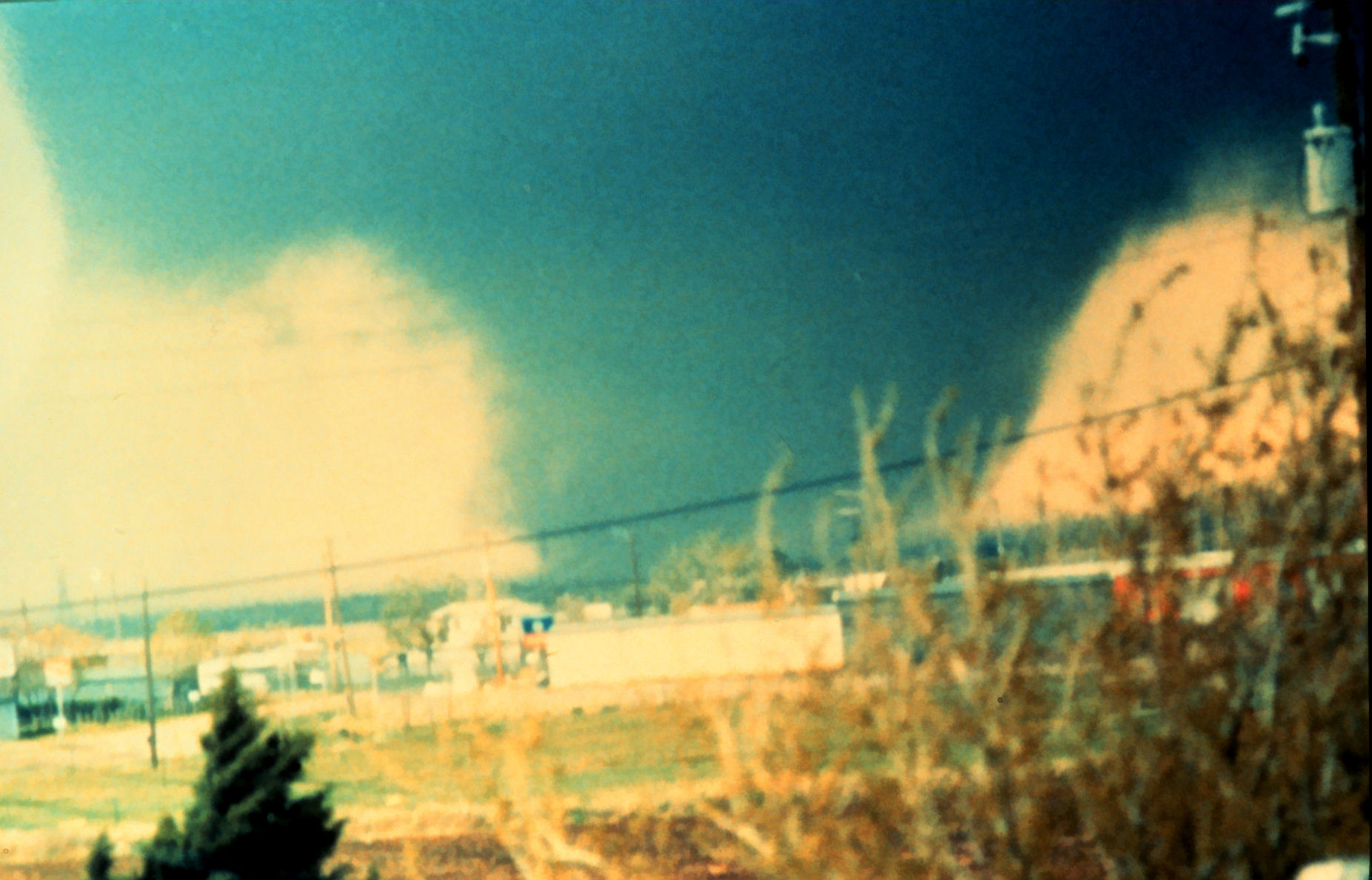
The large Wichita Falls F4 tornado moving through town.

FU	F0	F1	F2	F3	F4	F5
0	10	19	25	4	2	0

A large tornado outbreak also called "Terrible Tuesday", broke out in Texas and Oklahoma. Several deadly tornadoes occurred, including an F4 that decimated buildings in Wichita Falls, killing 42 people. Another F4 in Vernon, Texas killed 11. On the same day, an F3 tornado killed three people and injured 100 in Lawton, Oklahoma. On April 11th, Boonville, Indiana, was hit by an F2 tornado that killed one person and injured two when it struck a mobile home park. Overall, there were 58 deaths and over 2,000 injuries during the outbreak.

== May ==
There were 112 tornadoes reported in the U.S. in May.

=== May 2–3 ===
A tornado outbreak took place. Several tornadoes were confirmed, including an F4 tornado that killed one person near Ringwood, Oklahoma.

=== May 18 (Dominican Republic) ===
An F0 tornado went through San Francisco de Macoris destroying several homes and a stadium.

=== May 24 (Germany) ===
FU	F0	F1	F2	F3	F4	F5
2	0	1	2	1	1	0

A tornado outbreak occurred across Germany, causing at least five injuries but no fatalities. An F4 tornado struck the Bad Liebenwerda area, where several houses were damaged or destroyed. Combine harvesters were also carried large distances.

== June ==
150 tornadoes were reported in the U.S. in June.

=== June 28 ===
A small, but deadly outbreak of tornadoes broke out in Iowa and Minnesota, including an F4 that killed three people, injured 26 in Manson, Iowa.The F4 touched down at around 6:02 PM near Palmer and went through Pocahuntas County before it went through Calhoun County and directly hit Manson around 7:45 PM, hitting the heart of the town and destroying hundreds of homes and especially affecting the central business district.The total outbreak killed 5 people with the second tornado that caused fatalities being an F3 that hit Algona. The total number of tornadoes is disputed, some report 27 while others report 38.

== July ==
132 tornadoes were reported in the U.S. in July.

=== July 16 ===
An F3 tornado struck Cheyenne, Wyoming, causing one fatality and 40 injuries, becoming the most destructive tornado in the state's history. It stayed on the ground for 30 minutes and tracked for approximately nine miles as it moved eastward through the city, impacting the Buffalo Ridge area and a nearby mobile home park. The tornado was the first to receive national attention by videotape as it ripped apart 500 homes.

== August ==
126 tornadoes were reported in the U.S. in August.

=== August 7 (Canada) ===
FU	F0	F1	F2	F3	F4	F5
0	0	0	0	0	2	0

At least three tornadoes touched down in Southern Ontario, killing two people and injuring 142 others. Two F4 tornadoes were confirmed, one in Woodstock and another near East Zorra-Tavistock.

== September ==
69 tornadoes were reported in the U.S. in September.

=== September 4-5 ===
A tornado outbreak occurred in the Mid-Atlantic during Hurricane David. An F3 tornado, the strongest of 24 to be spawned by the hurricane, moved through the suburbs of Washington, D.C., killing one person in Tysons, Virginia.

== October ==
47 tornadoes were reported in the U.S. in October.

=== October 3 ===
A violent F4 tornado touched down in Windsor Locks, Connecticut, causing significant damage to the New England Air Museum, before crossing into neighboring Massachusetts and lifting. The tornado was one of the costliest tornadoes in U.S. history and killed three people.

== November ==
21 tornadoes were reported in the U.S. in November.

== December ==
2 tornadoes were reported in the U.S. in December.

=== December 11 (Argentina) ===
An F4 tornado struck Villas Ciudad de América in Córdoba Province, Argentina.

== See also ==
- Tornado
  - Tornadoes by year
  - Tornado records
  - Tornado climatology
  - Tornado myths
- List of tornado outbreaks
  - List of F5 and EF5 tornadoes
  - List of North American tornadoes and tornado outbreaks
  - List of 21st-century Canadian tornadoes and tornado outbreaks
  - List of European tornadoes and tornado outbreaks
  - List of tornadoes and tornado outbreaks in Asia
  - List of Southern Hemisphere tornadoes and tornado outbreaks
  - List of tornadoes striking downtown areas
- Tornado intensity
  - Fujita scale
  - Enhanced Fujita scale
