= Windsor Locks tornado =

F4 tornado in Connecticut, United States

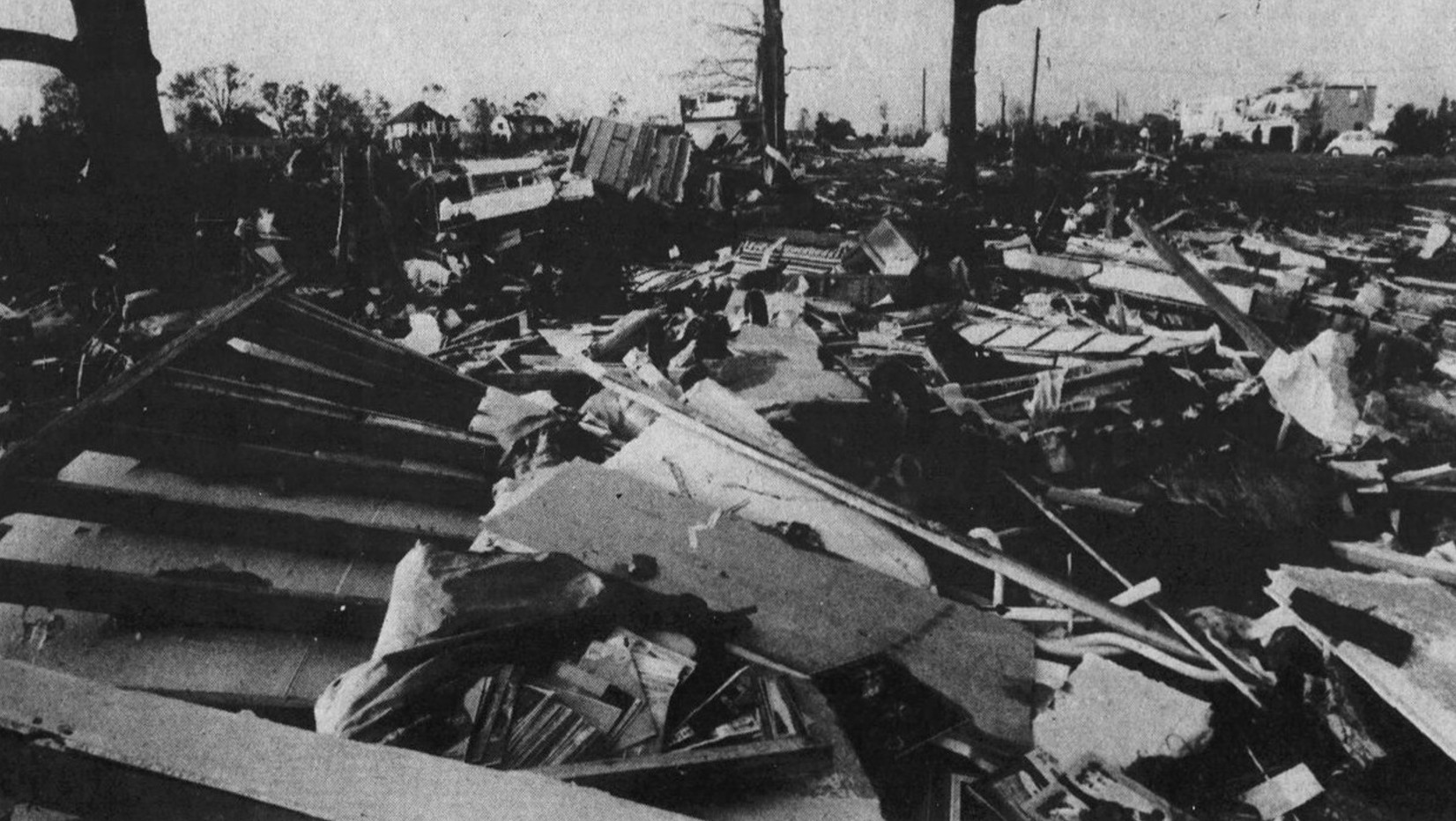
- Destroyed houses in Windsor Locks.

Meteorological history
- Formed: 3:00 PM EDT, 3 October 1979

F4 tornado
- on the Fujita scale
- Highest winds: 207–260 mph (333–418 km/h)

Overall effects
- Fatalities: 3
- Injuries: 500
- Damage: $420 million (1979 USD) $1.784 billion (2024 USD)
- Areas affected: North-central Connecticut
- Part of the Tornadoes of 1979

The Windsor Locks tornado was a destructive tornado that struck the towns of Windsor, Windsor Locks, and Suffield, Connecticut, and Feeding Hills, Massachusetts, on Wednesday, October 3, 1979. The short-lived but intense tornado struck without warning and caused three deaths and 500 injuries along its 11.3-mile (18.2 km) track. It received a rating of F4 on the Fujita scale, one of only three F4 tornadoes in Connecticut's history.

== Storm synopsis ==
The storm system that caused the tornado had produced severe weather, including two weak tornadoes, in eastern Pennsylvania and New Jersey that morning. This was an unusual setup for a significant tornado, associated with a warm front near a low-pressure center. A thunderstorm cell formed south of Long Island around 10:20 am, and became a supercell sometime later after interacting with a surface low-pressure center. It turned north as a left-moving supercell, meaning it moved left with respect to the mean atmospheric flow. Left-moving supercells are very rare, as cyclonic storms usually turn to the right of the mean flow. It is unknown whether this leftward movement was due to an atmospheric interaction or terrain-induced movement, as the storm moved straight up the Connecticut River valley.

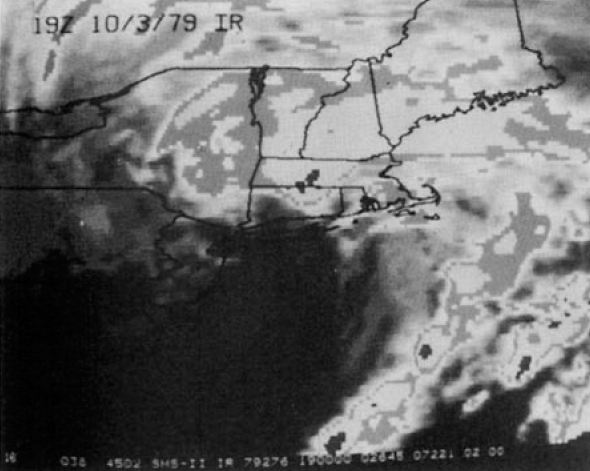
Infra-red weather satellite image of the northeastern United States at 3 pm local time (the same time the tornado touched down)

No tornado watches or warnings were issued before the storm struck. This was later determined to be because of missing atmospheric sounding data, as well as an incorrect assessment of the height of the tropopause, which led to an underestimation of the strength of the thunderstorm which produced the tornado. Although a severe thunderstorm warning was issued at 2:57 pm, very few people received the warnings in time.

Eyewitness reports said the tornado ripped the roof off a grocery store in Wethersfield, Connecticut. Trees were uprooted in East Hartford, Connecticut. The tornado then touched down in Poquonock, Connecticut, a village in the town of Windsor, just north of Hartford. Poquonock Elementary School was heavily damaged; fortunately, students were sent home early at 1:30 pm on Wednesdays. Students at a Brownie meeting were led into a hallway just before the auditorium they had been in was destroyed. The historic Poquonock Community Church building had its roof ripped off. All but one of the stained glass windows from the old church was salvaged. The tornado traveled almost due north, an unusual direction for a tornado. The most severe damage occurred along River Road, Hollow Brook Road, Pioneer Drive and Settler Circle, where large frame houses were left "in splinters".

The tornado roughly followed Connecticut Route 75 just east of Bradley International Airport. The airport's weather station recorded a wind gust of 39 m/s (87 mph; 140 km/h) as the tornado passed nearby. A United Airlines flight with 114 passengers was attempting to land as the tornado was passing the airport; the pilot saw the tornado and was able to abort the landing just in time. The tornado then crossed the northern portion of the airport, where the Bradley Air Museum (now the New England Air Museum) was located. More than 20 vintage aircraft were completely destroyed, with many more damaged. The museum's hangar was also rendered unusable. The tornado moved north into Feeding Hills before dissipating near the Westfield city line, about five miles (8 km) north of the Massachusetts state line.

The tornado was accompanied by more than 2.8 inches (7.1 cm) of rain, and several instances of downburst winds. Damage from downburst winds was reported across the Connecticut River in Enfield.

== Aftermath ==
Because there were no tornado warnings before the storm (and it occurred in an area where tornadoes are rare), the initial damage reports claimed an explosion had damaged a roof. Soon, however, the storm's nature and impact became apparent. Governor Ella Grasso lived just a block away from the tornado's path, though she was in Hartford at the time of the storm. She declared an 8 pm–5 am curfew in the days following the tornado. About 500 National Guardsmen were activated to prevent looting and direct traffic, and the area was declared a disaster area by President Carter. FEMA trailers were provided within a few days, and were used by many residents until reconstruction or repairs could be completed. In all, at least 38 businesses were damaged or destroyed, 65 homes were completely destroyed, and at least 75 homes were damaged. Twenty-five tobacco sheds were "extensively damaged". At the airport, most of the state's National Guard helicopters were damaged or destroyed, as were at least 30 vintage aircraft at the air museum adjacent to the airport.

Because of the vast scope of the damage, Windsor Locks town officials initially feared many, possibly even hundreds, of people could have been killed. While there were many serious injuries, only three people were killed by the storm. Two victims, construction workers working in a bank parking lot, took shelter in a work truck when they saw the storm approach. The first victim was killed immediately by a piece of flying lumber, the other died a few weeks later from his injuries, becoming the third victim. The second victim was found the next day across the street from her obliterated house. Over 400 people were hospitalized, mostly for injuries from flying glass or the victims' having been thrown by winds.

== Records ==
The Windsor Locks tornado, with $1.568 billion in damages (when adjusted for inflation), remains the costliest on record in the Northeastern United States and among the costliest in United States history. The three fatalities made it the deadliest tornado in Connecticut since the 1878 Wallingford tornado.

== See also ==
- Tornadoes of 1979
- List of North American tornadoes and tornado outbreaks
- List of Connecticut tornadoes
