= Lake Scarborough =

Lake in Texas, United States

- Interactive map of Lake Scarborough
- Coordinates: 31°53′33″N 99°26′55″W

Lake Scarborough is a lake located northwest of Coleman, Texas. The lake is situated east of U.S. Route 84 and west of U.S. Route 283.
