= Pruitt City, Oklahoma =

Unincorporated community in Oklahoma, US

Pruitt City
- Unincorporated community
- Location within the state of Oklahoma Pruitt City (the United States)
- Coordinates: 34°25′12″N 97°30′37″W
- Country: United States
- State: Oklahoma
- County: Carter
- Elevation: 1,070 ft (330 m)
- Time zone: UTC-6 (Central (CST))
  - Summer (DST): UTC-5 (CDT)
- GNIS feature ID: 1096948

Pruitt City is an unincorporated community in Carter County, Oklahoma, United States.
