= National Register of Historic Places listings in Chicot County, Arkansas =

Location of Chicot County in Arkansas

This is a list of the National Register of Historic Places listings in Chicot County, Arkansas.

This is intended to be a complete list of the properties on the National Register of Historic Places in Chicot County, Arkansas, United States. The locations of National Register properties for which the latitude and longitude coordinates are included below, may be seen in a map.

There are 22 properties listed on the National Register in the county, and one former listing.

Contents: Counties in Arkansas
- Arkansas
- Ashley
- Baxter
- Benton
- Boone
- Bradley
- Calhoun
- Carroll
- Chicot
- Clark
- Clay
- Cleburne
- Cleveland
- Columbia
- Conway
- Craighead
- Crawford
- Crittenden
- Cross
- Dallas
- Desha
- Drew
- Faulkner
- Franklin
- Fulton
- Garland
- Grant
- Greene
- Hempstead
- Hot Spring
- Howard
- Independence
- Izard
- Jackson
- Jefferson
- Johnson
- Lafayette
- Lawrence
- Lee
- Lincoln
- Little River
- Logan
- Lonoke
- Madison
- Marion
- Miller
- Mississippi
- Monroe
- Montgomery
- Nevada
- Newton
- Ouachita
- Perry
- Phillips
- Pike
- Poinsett
- Polk
- Pope
- Prairie
- Pulaski (Little Rock)
- Randolph
- St. Francis
- Saline
- Scott
- Searcy
- Sebastian
- Sevier
- Sharp
- Stone
- Union
- Van Buren
- Washington
- White
- Woodruff
- Yell

This National Park Service list is complete through NPS recent listings posted June 26, 2026.

== Current listings ==
	Name on the Register	Image	Date listed	Location	City or town	Description
1	American Legion Post No. 127 Building	American Legion Post No. 127 Building	October 8, 1992 (#92001350)	Northeastern corner of the junction of Cherry and Armstrong Sts. 33°06′37″N 91°15′50″W	Eudora	
2	Dr. A. G. Anderson House	Dr. A. G. Anderson House	July 24, 1992 (#92000929)	Junction of Duncan and Main Sts. 33°06′33″N 91°15′41″W	Eudora	
3	Carlton House	Carlton House	June 5, 1991 (#91000692)	434 S. Lakeshore Dr. 33°19′33″N 91°16′59″W	Lake Village	ca. 1906 Colonial Revival house
4	Chicot County Courthouse	Chicot County Courthouse	February 1, 2006 (#05001592)	108 Main St. 33°29′00″N 91°16′55″W	Lake Village	1956 Art Deco-inspired county courthouse
5	Crenshaw-Burleigh House	Crenshaw-Burleigh House	January 27, 2012 (#11001047)	108 N. Main St. 33°31′37″N 91°26′12″W	Dermott	
6	M.E. Davis House	M.E. Davis House	September 22, 2004 (#04001034)	200 N. Knox St. 33°31′47″N 91°26′27″W	Dermott	
7	Dermott Bank & Trust Company Building	Dermott Bank & Trust Company Building	May 19, 1994 (#94000466)	Northwestern corner of the junction of N. Arkansas and E. Iowa Sts. 33°31′41″N 91°26′01″W	Dermott	
8	Dermott Commercial Historic District	Dermott Commercial Historic District	September 23, 2010 (#10000789)	101-120 N. Freeman St.; 101-219 E. Iowa St. and 131 N. Main St. 33°31′40″N 91°26′05″W	Dermott	
9	Sam Epstein House		September 21, 1992 (#92001226)	488 Lakeshore Dr. 33°19′34″N 91°16′59″W	Lake Village	House burned on June 30, 2012.
10	Eudora City Hall	Eudora City Hall	October 5, 2006 (#06000910)	239 S. Main St. 33°06′37″N 91°15′42″W	Eudora	
11	First Baptist Church	First Baptist Church	June 3, 1998 (#98000645)	Highway 159, S., 1 mile south of Eudora; 33°05′24″N 91°16′08″W	Eudora	
12	Gregory Dipping Vat		September 20, 2006 (#06000830)	122 Rogers Rd. 33°18′50″N 91°19′55″W	Lake Village	
13	Harden Family Cemetery		May 24, 2004 (#04000508)	Hardin Rd. 33°16′24″N 91°16′38″W	Jennie	
14	Lake Village Commercial Historic District	Lake Village Commercial Historic District	February 18, 2011 (#11000025)	Roughly bounded by Lakeshore Dr., Jackson St., Chicot St., and Church St. 33°19′52″N 91°16′58″W	Lake Village	1906-1960 commercial center of the Chicot County seat of government
15	Lake Village Confederate Monument	Lake Village Confederate Monument	May 3, 1996 (#96000509)	Lakeshore Dr. median, between Main and Jackson Sts. 33°19′51″N 91°17′05″W	Lake Village	1910 commemorative sculpture
16	Lake Village Post Office	Lake Village Post Office	August 14, 1998 (#98000916)	206 S. Cokley St. 33°19′49″N 91°17′00″W	Lake Village	1938 structure featuring interior Depression-era mural
17	Lakeport Plantation	Lakeport Plantation	November 20, 1974 (#74000466)	About 3 miles southeast of Shives, off Highway 142; 33°15′24″N 91°09′19″W	Shives	ca. 1859 plantation house, best extant example of antebellum plantations in Arkansas
18	A. Landi General Merchandise Building		October 8, 1992 (#92001347)	Highway 8; 33°05′31″N 91°12′38″W	Grand Lake	Demolished
19	Dr. E.P. McGehee Infirmary	Dr. E.P. McGehee Infirmary	June 1, 2005 (#05000487)	614 S. Cokley St. 33°19′43″N 91°17′05″W	Lake Village	
20	New Hope Missionary Baptist Church Cemetery, Historic Section	New Hope Missionary Baptist Church Cemetery, Historic Section	September 21, 1992 (#92001227)	St. Marys St. 33°19′48″N 91°17′12″W	Lake Village	early 20th-century graves associated with town's black community
21	Scott Memorial Methodist Episcopal Church		January 13, 2022 (#100007330)	350 North Main St. 33°06′45″N 91°15′43″W	Eudora	
22	John Tushek Building	John Tushek Building	August 5, 1993 (#93000811)	108 Main St. 33°19′53″N 91°16′57″W	Lake Village	1906 Beaux Arts-style commercial building

== Former listings ==
	Name on the Register	Image	Date listed	Date removed	Location	City or town	Description
1	Bunker House		December 6, 1992 (#92001622)	October 4, 1999	AR 159 W of jct. with US 65/82	Lake Village	
2	Chicot County Training School	Chicot County Training School	May 26, 2004 (#04000490)	September 1, 2022	Junction of Hazel and N. School St. 33°32′08″N 91°26′19″W	Dermott	Destroyed by fire in 2006.
3	P. and J. Liberto-Rosa Portera Building		October 8, 1992 (#92001348)	January 14, 2002	Main Street	Eudora	
4	Walker House		December 22, 1982 (#82000799)	September 24, 2004	606 Main St.	Dermott	Destroyed by fire February 14, 2004.

== See also ==
- List of National Historic Landmarks in Arkansas
- National Register of Historic Places listings in Arkansas
