= Voelcker & Dixon =

American architectural firm

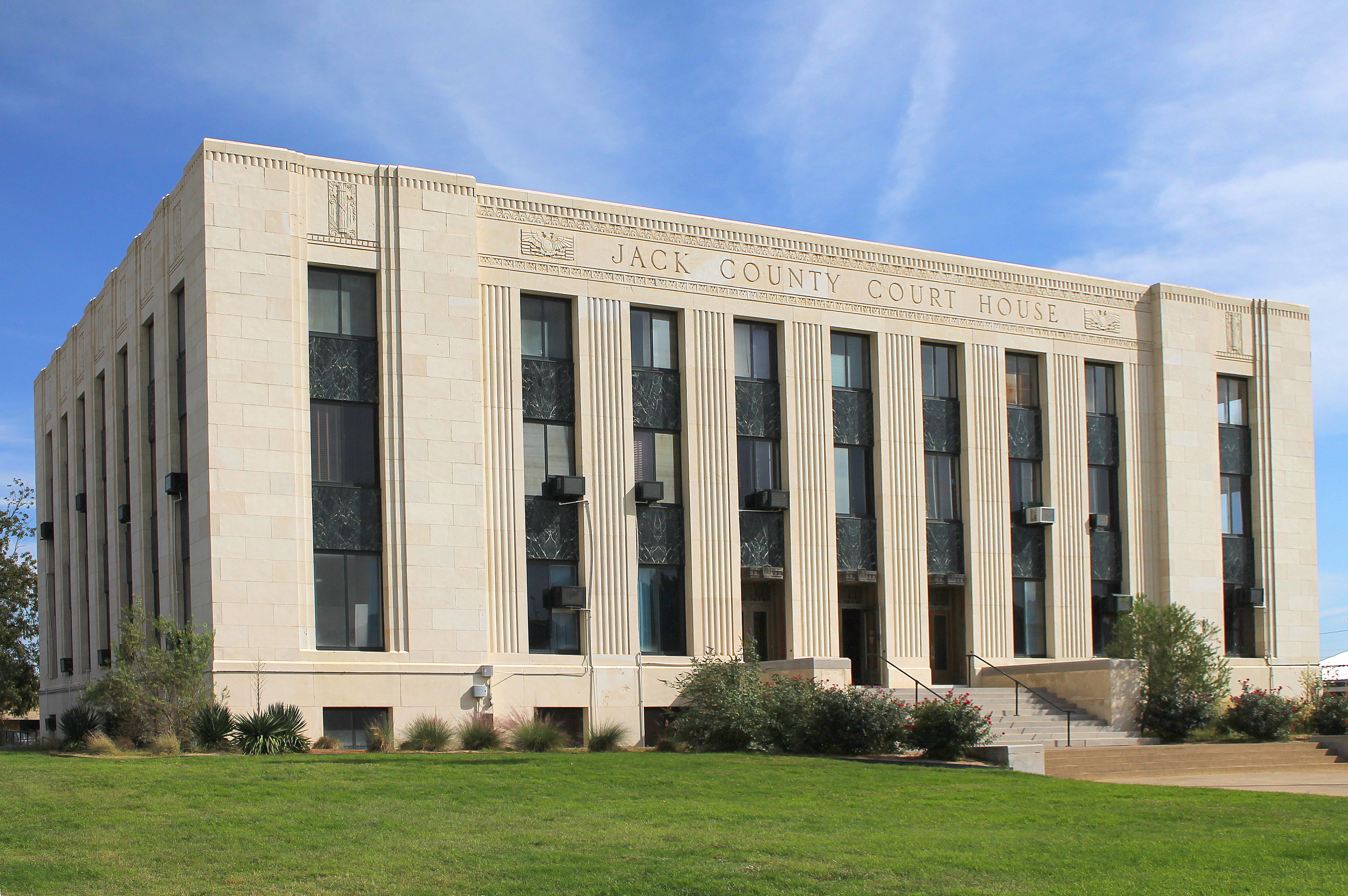
The Jack County Courthouse, in Jacksboro, Texas.

Voelcker & Dixon was an architectural firm based in Wichita Falls, Texas which designed numerous county courthouses in Texas and some works elsewhere. At least two of their works, the Jack County Courthouse in Jacksboro, Texas and the Chicot County Courthouse in Lake Village, Arkansas, are listed on the National Register of Historic Places.

It was a partnership of Herbert Voelcker and Jesse G. Dixon. Voelcker worked as an architect from at least 1916 and had extensive experience in public buildings in the Art Deco and Art Moderne styles, having designed eleven county courthouses in Texas.

Herbert Voelcker was born in 1888 in New Braunfels, Texas. He earned an Architectural Engineering degree from Texas A&M College in 1909. He worked in Waco, Fort Worth, and Austin before finding employment with Lewis and Kitchen's Kansas City and Chicago offices. He then came to Wichita Falls in 1916, where he first worked with Madorie & Fields. He established the partnership with Jesse G. Dixon in 1918.

About Jesse G. Dixon, little is known, and the firm's archives are now owned by Gary Baker and Associates, LLC. From the National Register of Historic Places registration made in 2012:

Voelcker & Dixon was the premier architectural firm in Wichita Falls during the city's "golden age" after the discovery of the nearby Burkburnett Oil Field in 1918, which led to the establishment of nine refineries and 47 factories by 1920. The firm is credited with several major commercial buildings in downtown Wichita Falls, as well as public buildings, including the Wichita Fall Hospital (1926), Wichita Falls City Hall and Municipal Auditorium (1928, with Lang & Witchell), the U.S. Court House and Post Office (1935), Hardin Junior College (later Midwestern University) Administration Building (1936), and the Psychopathic Ward of the Wichita Falls State Psychopathic Hospital (1938). The variety of these large scale-buildings in style, form, and function displays the firm's versatility, employing elements of various period styles with contemporary construction techniques (particularly steel and concrete forms, with stone and brick veneer). The refined eclectic but traditional architectural vocabulary of their 1920s buildings gave way to the modernistic mode by the end of the decade, when they began to produce designs for numerous north Texas county courthouses built with federal funding during the Great Depression.

Voelcker & Dixon designed ten county courthouses in north Texas between 1928 and 1940 (Herbert Voelcker also designed the 1955 Waller County Courthouse). Most of these followed the modem idiom, blending a mix of traditional and contemporary forms in the Modern Classical style. The 1928 Wilbarger County Courthouse is the most conservative of these, tied to Beaux Arts tradition with a gray limestone facade featuring a piano nobile with a prominent 2-story attached Ionic colonnade supporting a molded entablature, and corner pavilions with pediment windows. The Callahan County Courthouse of 1929 is a much simplified version of this form, composed of buff brick with low-profile brick pilasters and limited cast stone ornament. The firm's modernistic Cottle County Courthouse of 1930 is a departure from their previous work, with dramatic stepped massing and the incorporation of large-scale and highly stylized figurative sculpture into the building facade, demonstrating an understanding and appreciation of contemporary design elsewhere in the United States, in particular the 1924 design of the Nebraska State Capitol by Bertram Goodhue. Voelcker and Dixon's seven other Texas courthouses designed through 1940 -including the Jack County Courthouse - are good examples of Modern Classicism, with varying degrees of low-relief sculpture. The designs for these courthouses are much simpler than their earlier examples, with a tendency towards a single massive block with simple projecting pavilions or a single block broken by vertical windows.

Works by either architect or the firm (with attribution) include:

- Wichita Fall Hospital (1926) (Voelcker & Dixon)
- Wichita Falls City Hall and Municipal Auditorium (1928) (Voelcker & Dixon with Lang & Witchell)
- Wilbarger County Courthouse (1928) (Voelcker & Dixon)
- Callahan County Courthouse (1929) (Voelcker & Dixon)
- W.A. Freear Furniture Company / Maskat Shrine Temple Building (1929) (Voelcker & Dixon)
- Cottle County Courthouse (1930) (Voelcker & Dixon)
- U.S. Court House and Post Office (1935) (Voelcker & Dixon)
- Hardin Junior College (later Midwestern University) Administration Building (1936) (Voelcker & Dixon)
- Bonham High School Auditorium and Gymnasium (1937) (Voelcker & Dixon)
- Psychopathic Ward of the Wichita Falls State Psychopathic Hospital (1938) (Voelcker & Dixon)
- Jack County Courthouse (1940), 100 N. Main St. Jacksboro, TX (Voelcker & Dixon), NRHP-listed
- Waller County Courthouse (1955) (Herbert Voelcker)
- Chicot County Courthouse (1956), Lake Village, Arkansas. A contributing building in NRHP-listed Lake Village Commercial Historic District
