= Harden Family Cemetery =

Historic cemetery in Arkansas, United States

- U.S. National Register of Historic Places
- Location within Arkansas Location within the United States
- Nearest city: Jennie, Arkansas
- Coordinates: 33°16′24″N 91°16′38″W
- Area: 1.1 acres (0.45 ha)
- MPS: Ethnic and Racial Minority Settlement of the Arkansas Delta MPS
- NRHP reference No.: 04000508
- Added to NRHP: May 24, 2004

The Harden Family Cemetery is a historic cemetery in rural Chicot County, Arkansas. It is located in a horse pasture off Hardin Road, north of the hamlet of Jennie, which is on Arkansas Highway 13 south of Lake Village.

== History ==
The small family cemetery, which is not visible from the road, contains fourteen marked graves, dating from 1892 to the 1960s. All are for members of the Harden family, who were an African-American family prominent in the life of the small community, and among the earliest of their race to settle the area. The patriarch of the family, John Harden Sr., was a freed slave who died in 1892. One grandson was a local pastor, another was a schoolteacher.

The cemetery was listed on the National Register of Historic Places in 2004.

== See also ==
- National Register of Historic Places listings in Chicot County, Arkansas
