= Dr. A. G. Anderson House =

Historic house in Arkansas, United States

- U.S. National Register of Historic Places
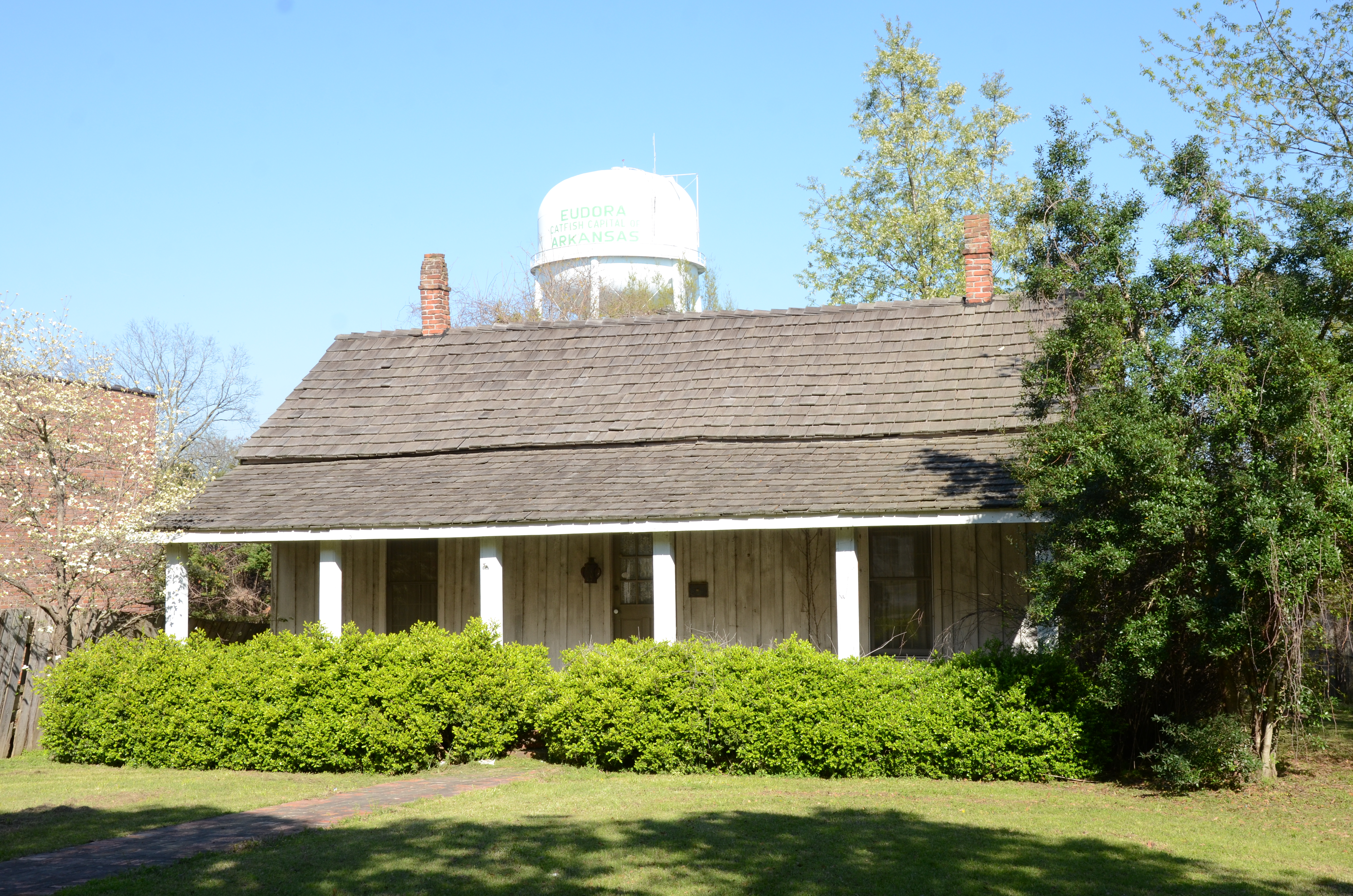

- Location within Arkansas Location within the United States
- Location: Jct. of Duncan and Main Sts., Eudora, Arkansas
- Coordinates: 33°6′33″N 91°15′41″W
- Area: less than one acre
- Built: 1901
- Architectural style: Plain Traditional
- NRHP reference No.: 92000929
- Added to NRHP: July 24, 1992

The Dr. A. G. Anderson House is a historic house located at the junction of Duncan and Main Streets in Eudora, Arkansas.

== Description and history ==
It is a single-story vernacular T-shaped central hall cottage, built in 1901 for Dr. A. G. Anderson by hired African-American labor. The house has board-and-batten walls, and was constructed of cypress and pine. The roof, originally clad in wood shingles, was for many years covered in tin, but restoration work done in the 1990s returned the roof to wood shingling. The front facade has a full-width porch with a shed roof. The building is distinctive as an early wood-frame house set in an area now filled with brick commercial construction.

The house was listed on the National Register of Historic Places on July 24, 1992.

== See also ==
- National Register of Historic Places listings in Chicot County, Arkansas
