= First Baptist Church (Eudora, Arkansas) =

Historic church in Arkansas, United States

- U.S. National Register of Historic Places
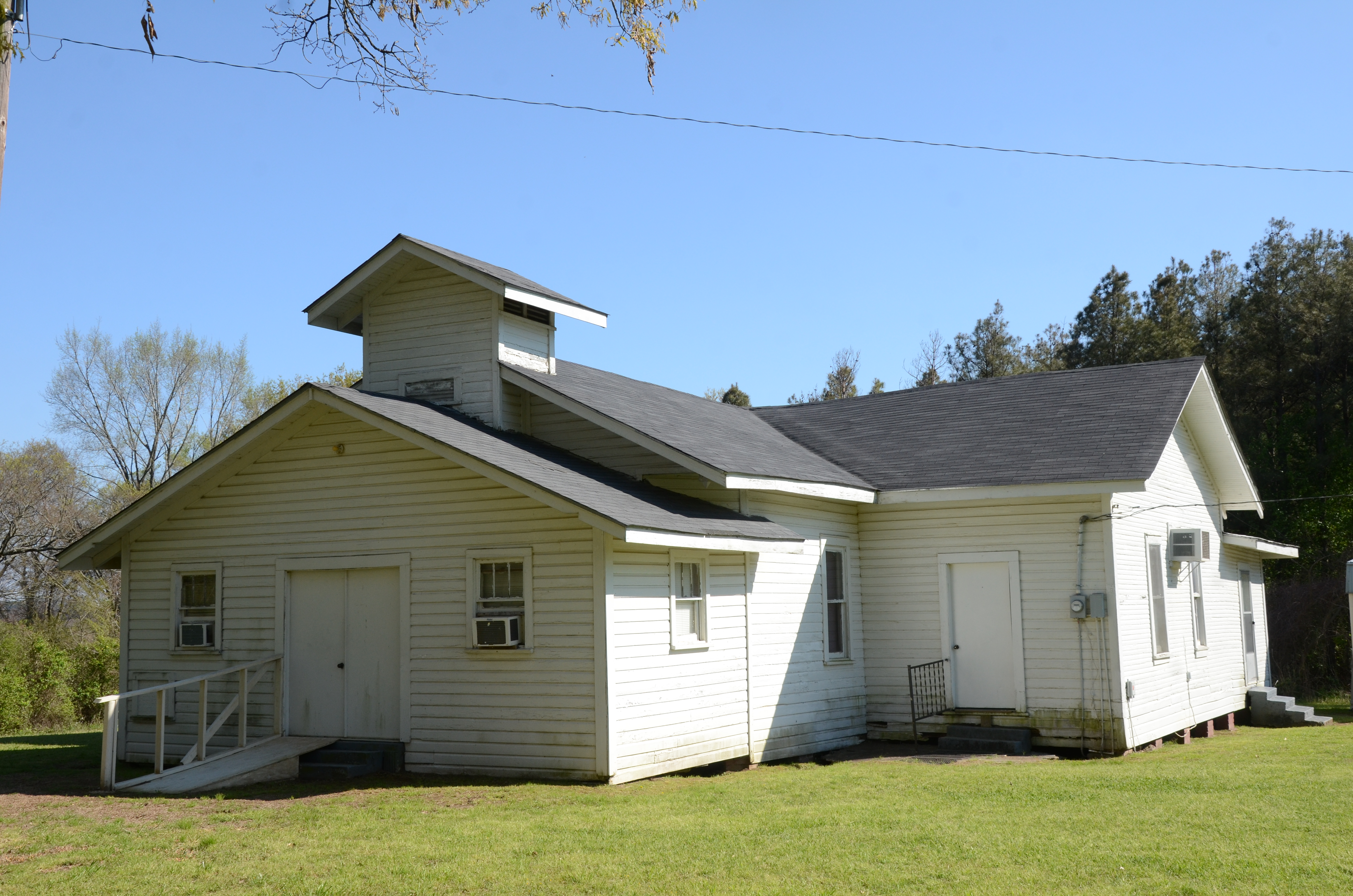

- Location within Arkansas Location within the United States
- Location: AR 159 S, 1 mi. S of Eudora, Eudora, Arkansas
- Coordinates: 33°5′24″N 91°16′8″W
- Area: 1 acre (0.40 ha)
- Built: 1900
- Architectural style: Bungalow/craftsman
- MPS: Ethnic and Racial Minority Settlement of the Arkansas Delta MPS
- NRHP reference No.: 98000645
- Added to NRHP: June 3, 1998

The First Baptist Church is a historic church on Arkansas Highway 159 South, 1 mile (1.6 km) south of Eudora, Arkansas. The wood-frame church was built in 1900, and rebuilt in 1946 after sustaining significant storm damage. The building is clad in a combination of weatherboard and novelty siding, and is covered by a shingled cross-gable roof. It is topped by a short gable-roofed belltower. The front facade is symmetrically organized around the main entrance, with the door recessed in a projecting section with its own, lower, end gable. The double doors are flanked by three-over-one windows. The building is associated with the African-American community that developed in the area during the first half of the 20th century.

The building was listed on the National Register of Historic Places in 1998.

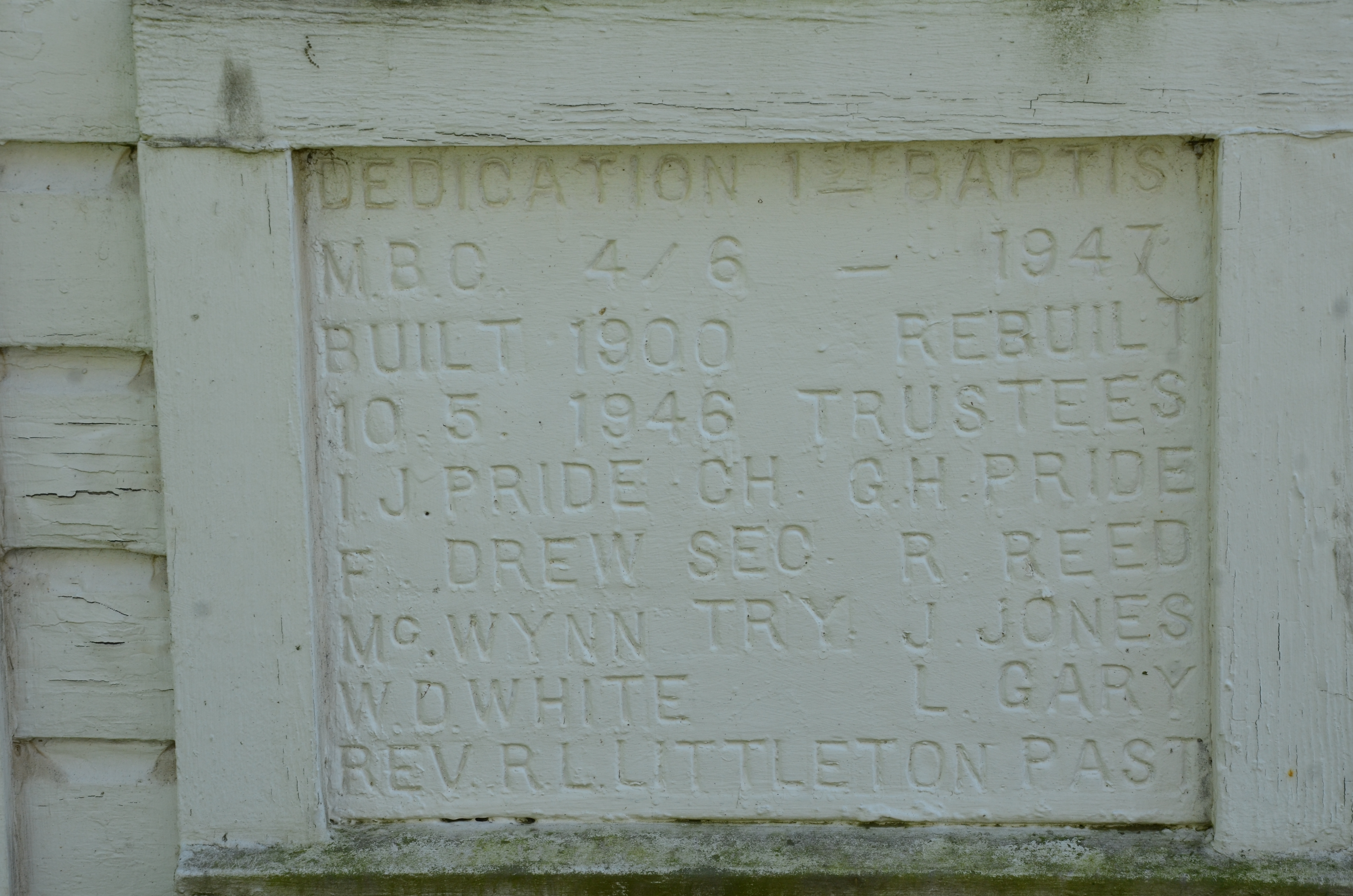
Dedication Plaque

== See also ==
- National Register of Historic Places listings in Chicot County, Arkansas
