= Carlton House (Lake Village, Arkansas) =

Historic house in Arkansas, United States

- U.S. National Register of Historic Places
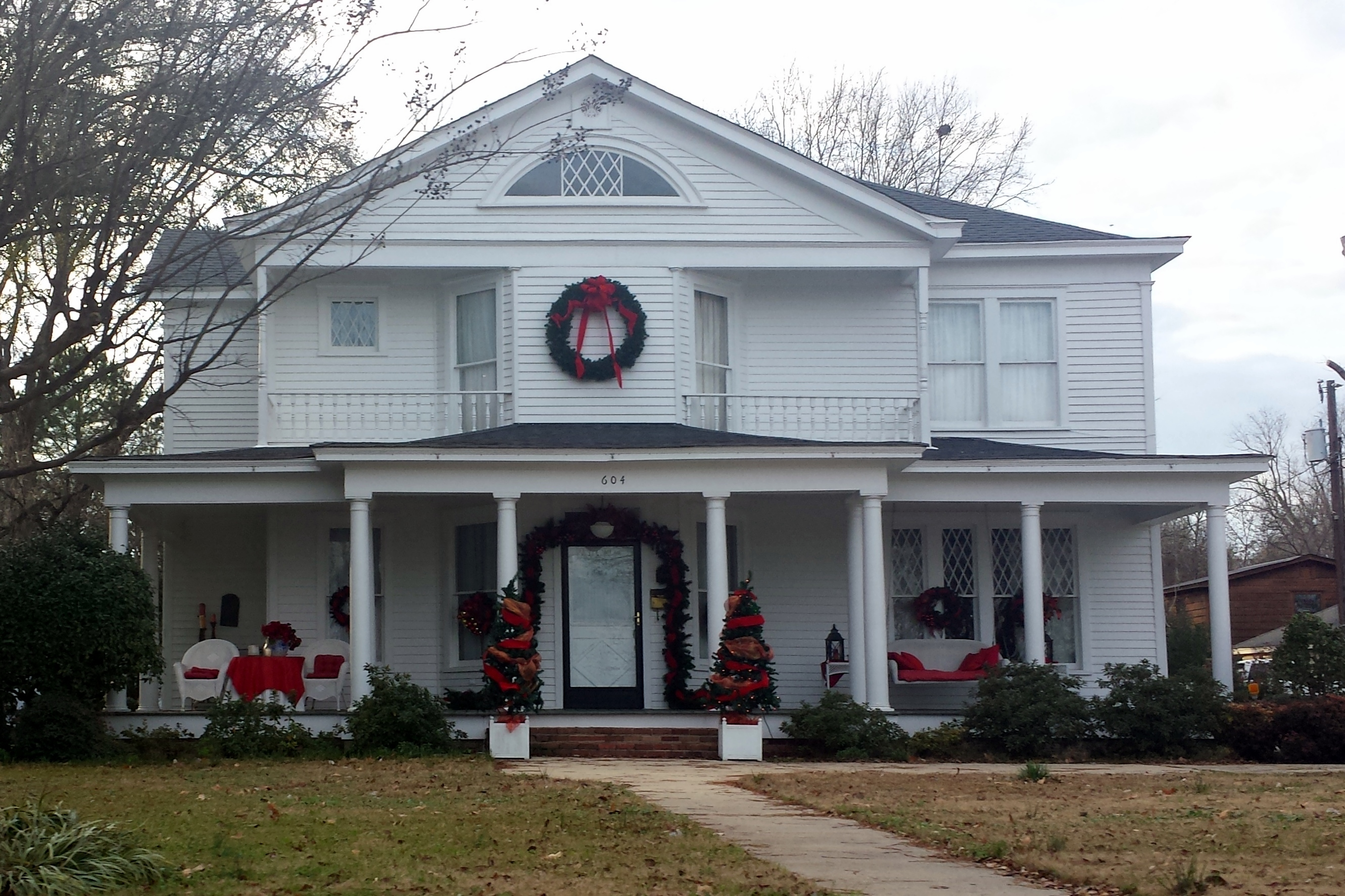

- Location within Arkansas Location within the United States
- Location: 434 S. Lakeshore Drive, Lake Village, Arkansas
- Coordinates: 33°19′33″N 91°16′59″W
- Area: less than one acre
- Architect: Albert G. Simms
- Architectural style: Colonial Revival, Vernacular Colonial Revival
- NRHP reference No.: 91000692
- Added to NRHP: June 5, 1991

The Carlton House is a historic house located at 434 South Lakeshore Drive in Lake Village, Arkansas.

== Description and history ==
The two-story, Colonial Revival style house was designed by local architect Albert G. Simms and constructed in 1906. The central facade has a large central projection with a gabled roof. This section is fronted by a porch with a low pitch hip roof, which continues around the sides of the projection, and is supported by simple Colonial Revival columns. The projecting section's gable end hangs over a recessed second floor porch area that has a low railing, that also has a flush polygonal bay section that is continued on the first floor, where the main entrance is located. The house is one of a small number of surviving Colonial Revival houses from an era when Lake Village was developed as a resort area.

The house was listed on the National Register of Historic Places on June 5, 1991.

== See also ==
- National Register of Historic Places listings in Chicot County, Arkansas
