= Chicot County Courthouse =

- U.S. National Register of Historic Places
- U.S. Historic district – Contributing property
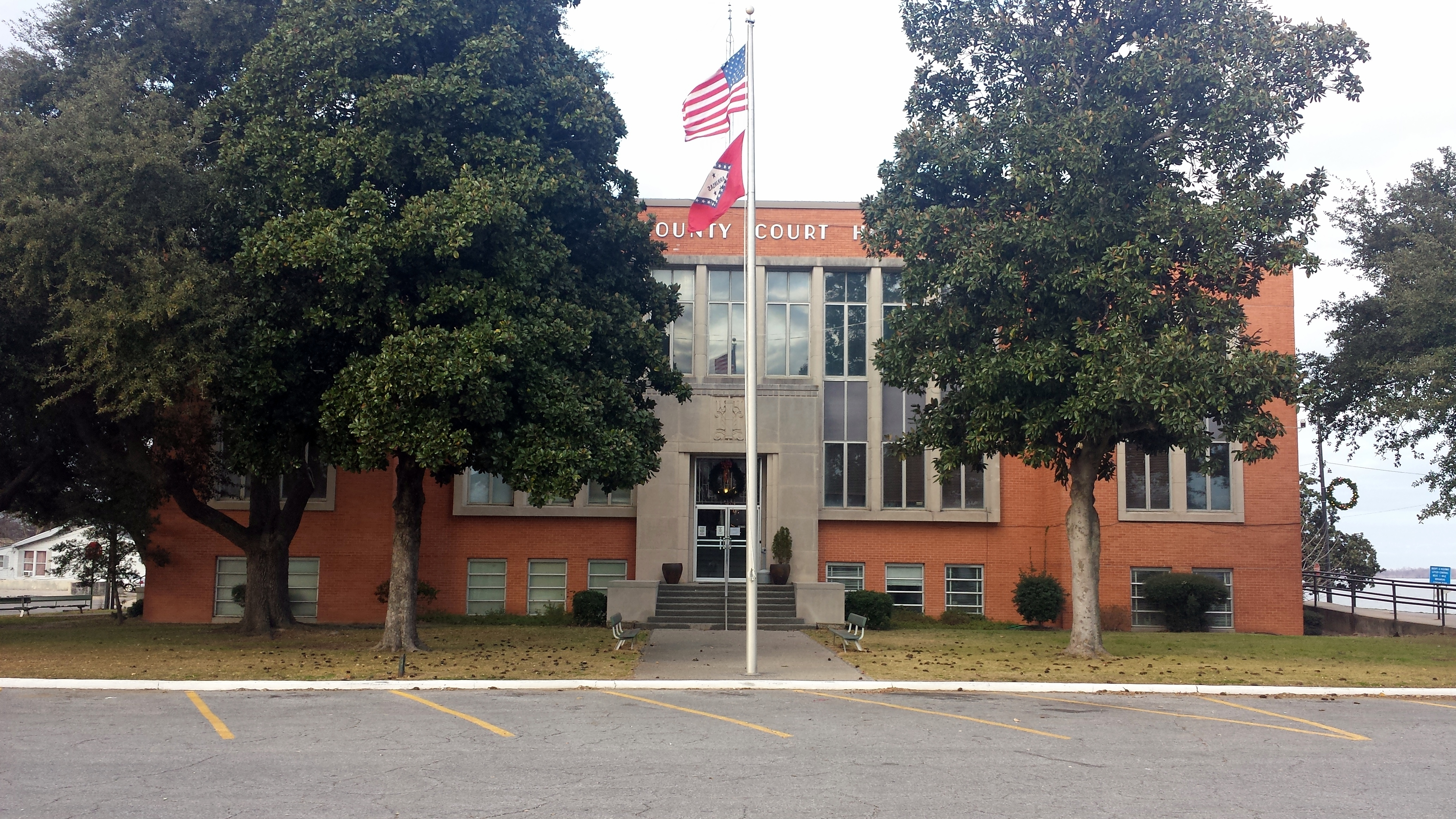

- Location within Arkansas Location within the United States
- Interactive map showing the location for Chicot County Courthouse
- Location: 108 Main Street; Lake Village, Arkansas
- Coordinates: 33°20′0″N 91°16′55″W
- Area: less than one acre
- Built: 1956
- Architect: Herbert Voelker and J.L. Dixon
- Architectural style: Art Deco
- Part of: Lake Village Commercial Historic District (ID11000025)
- NRHP reference No.: 05001592

Significant dates
- Added to NRHP: February 1, 2006
- Designated CP: February 18, 2011

The Chicot County Courthouse is a courthouse in Lake Village, Arkansas, the county seat of Chicot County, built in 1956. Located at the end of the Lake Village Commercial Historic District along Lake Chicot, the courthouse is a culturally significant landmark for both its architectural style and historical importance to the county. It was because of this dual significance that the property was listed on the National Register of Historic Places in 2006.

== History ==
Chicot County was formed on October 25, 1823 from Arkansas County, with county government first established at Villemont. Along the Mississippi River, Villemont eventually eroded into the river and the county moved its government to Columbia in 1838. After meeting a similar fate, the county again moved, this time to Masona in 1855. Two years later, the county seat moved a final time to Lake Village, with county courthouse and jail facilities constructed the same year. The first Lake Village courthouse would serve for 50 years before being replaced by a neoclassical courthouse in 1907. The 1907 structure suffered foundation problems and was replaced with the current Chicot County Courthouse in 1956. Herbert Voelker and J.L. Dixon were the architects hired for the new courthouse's design. Voelker had extensive experience in public buildings in the Art Deco and Art Moderne styles, with eleven previous county courthouses already designed in Texas.

=== Cultural significance ===
The new county courthouse was built during a time of economic depression in the Arkansas Delta. Many farmers were turning to mechanization, displacing many fieldhands and laborers toward larger cities. Accompanying the rapidly declining population, the delta also began to lose accompanying industry, businesses, and services. Jack Rhodes was elected mayor in 1957, and began to turn around the city's decline with several infrastructure improvement projects and constructing new buildings.

Perhaps the region's best example of renewal during this period was the restoration of Lake Chicot. Due to silt from upstream, the lake had become polluted during this period. The lake's condition was becoming an embarrassment to the city, causing Lake Village to cancel the 1957 Chicot Water Carnival. In response to the lake's pollution problem, a meeting took place in the Chicot County Courthouse in 1968. Attending the "Lake Chicot Project" meeting were representatives from the Arkansas Game and Fish Commission (AGFC), the United States Army Corps of Engineers (USACE), and the Chicot County Rural Development Authority. The end result of the project was the construction of a dam, two pumping plants, sediment control, and fish stocking measures to improve the lake's scenic, environmental, and recreational value.

Because of the great impact the renewal projects had on Chicot County and the importance of the county government that instigated the improvements, the Chicot County Courthouse played a major role in the revitalization of the area during the 1960s following a period of steep decline.

== See also ==
- National Register of Historic Places listings in Chicot County, Arkansas
