= Eudora City Hall =

- U.S. National Register of Historic Places
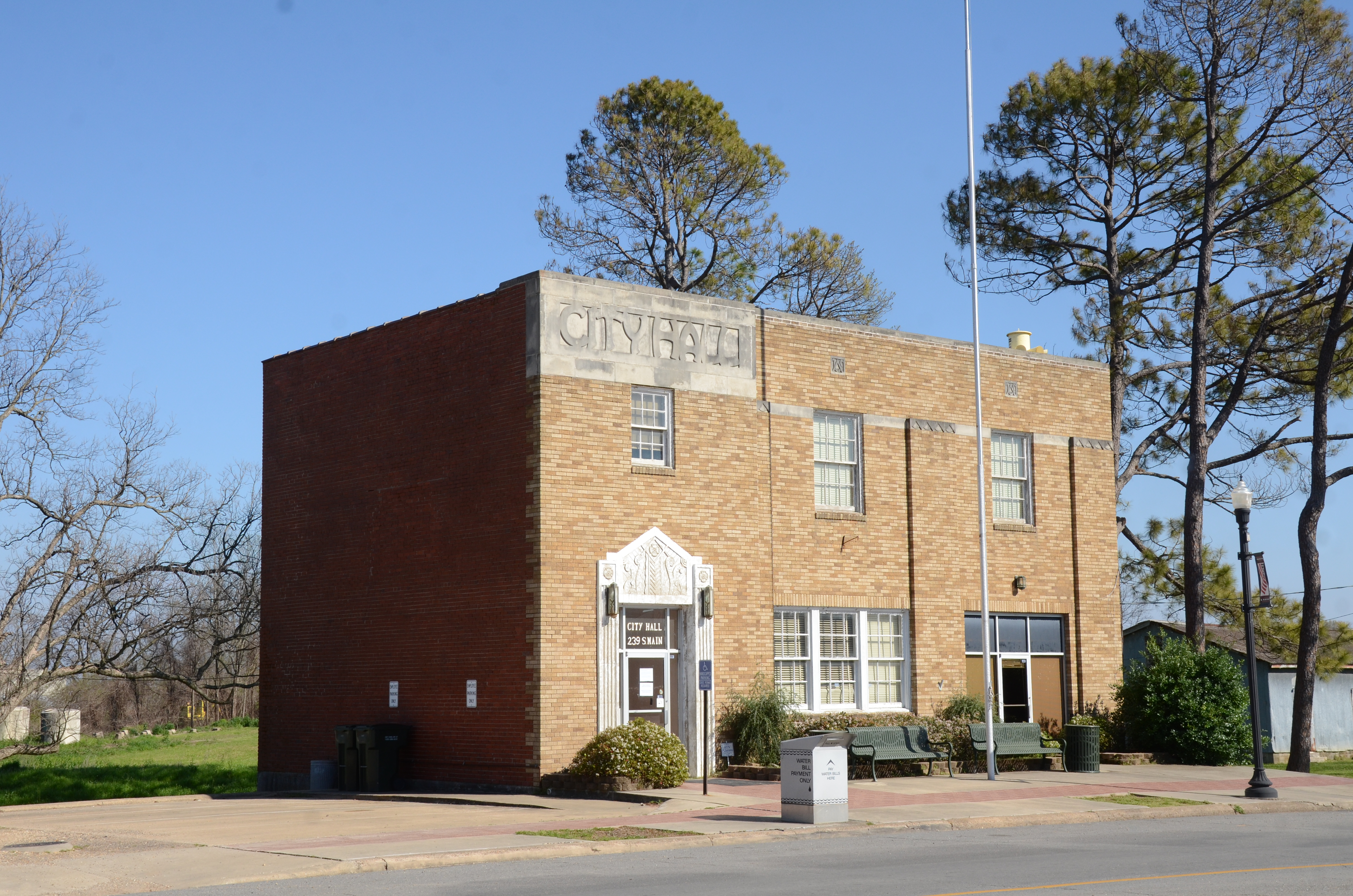

- Location within Arkansas Location within the United States
- Location: 239 S. Main St., Eudora, Arkansas
- Coordinates: 33°6′37″N 91°15′42″W
- Area: less than one acre
- Architect: A.N. McAninch, T.A. Lusinger
- Architectural style: Art Deco
- MPS: New Deal Recovery Efforts in Arkansas MPS
- NRHP reference No.: 06000910
- Added to NRHP: October 5, 2006

Eudora City Hall is located at 239 South Main Street in Eudora, Arkansas. The two story Art Deco brick building was built in 1936 as part of a Public Works Administration project, to a design by Little Rock architect A. N. McAninch. The front facade is faced in yellow brick, while other sides are faced in red brick; the roof is flat, with a parapet running around the top of the building. The only notable change to its exterior since its construction is the replacement of its wooden front doors with modern plate glass doors.

The building was listed on the National Register of Historic Places in 2006.

== See also ==
- National Register of Historic Places listings in Chicot County, Arkansas
