= A. Landi General Merchandise Building =

- U.S. National Register of Historic Places
- Location within Arkansas Location within the United States
- Location: AR 8, Grand Lake, Arkansas
- Coordinates: 33°5′31″N 91°12′38″W
- Area: less than one acre
- Architectural style: Plain Traditional
- MPS: Ethnic and Racial Minority Settlement of the Arkansas Delta MPS
- NRHP reference No.: 92001347
- Added to NRHP: October 8, 1992

The A. Landi General Merchandise Building is a historic commercial building on Arkansas Highway 8 near Eudora, Arkansas in the village of Grand Lake. Built c. 1920, it is a single story wood-frame building with Plain Traditional styling, including a central section on its main facade with a raised parapet section over the centered entrance. The building is significant for its association with the Landi family, one of a small number of Italian immigrants to remain in the area after the plantation economy collapsed.

The building was listed on the National Register of Historic Places in 1992.

== See also ==
- National Register of Historic Places listings in Chicot County, Arkansas
