= Sam Epstein House =

Historic house in Lake Village, Arkansas, US

- U.S. National Register of Historic Places
- Location within Arkansas Location within the United States
- Location: 488 Lake Shore Dr., Lake Village, Arkansas
- Coordinates: 33°19′34″N 91°16′59″W
- Area: less than one acre
- Architectural style: Colonial Revival, Bungalow/craftsman
- MPS: Ethnic and Racial Minority Settlement of the Arkansas Delta MPS
- NRHP reference No.: 92001226
- Added to NRHP: September 21, 1992

The Sam Epstein House is a historic house at 488 Lakeshore Drive in Lake Village, Arkansas. The Colonial Revival house is notable for its association with Sam Epstein, a Jewish immigrant who was one of Lake Village's first shopkeepers, and eventually amassed more than 10,000 acres (4,000 ha) of land in Chicot County devoted to agricultural purposes. He was active in the civic and economic life of the community, supporting others (most notably H. L. Hunt) in the development of business opportunities.

The house was listed on the National Register of Historic Places in 1992.

== See also ==
- National Register of Historic Places listings in Chicot County, Arkansas
