= Dr. E.P. McGehee Infirmary =

- U.S. National Register of Historic Places
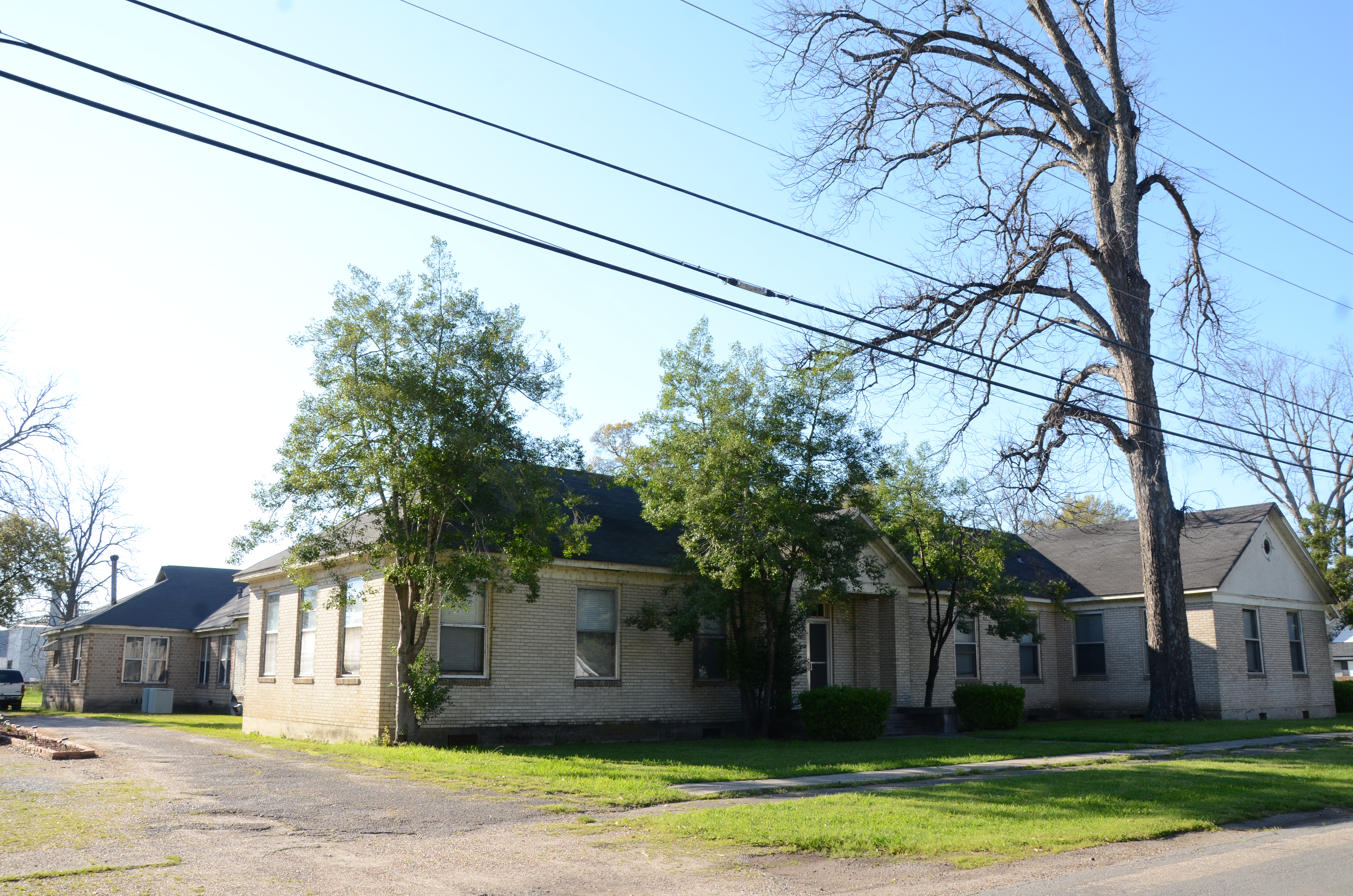

- Location within Arkansas Location within the United States
- Location: 614 S. Cokley St., Lake Village, Arkansas
- Coordinates: 33°19′43″N 91°17′5″W
- Area: less than one acre
- Built: 1910
- Architectural style: Colonial Revival, Bungalow/craftsman
- NRHP reference No.: 05000487
- Added to NRHP: June 1, 2005

The Dr. E.P. McGehee Infirmary is a historic medical complex at 614 South Cokley Street in Lake Village, Arkansas. The complex began as a single wood-frame structure in 1910 serving as a medical clinic for the local African-American population. It was the town's primary infirmary from its establishment until 1973. It was established and operated by Dr. Edward Pelham McGehee until his death in 1950. It is now home to the Museum of Chicot County.

The complex was listed on the National Register of Historic Places in 2005.

== See also ==
- National Register of Historic Places listings in Chicot County, Arkansas
