= Cottle County Courthouse Historic District =

Historic district in Texas, United States

- U.S. National Register of Historic Places
- U.S. Historic district
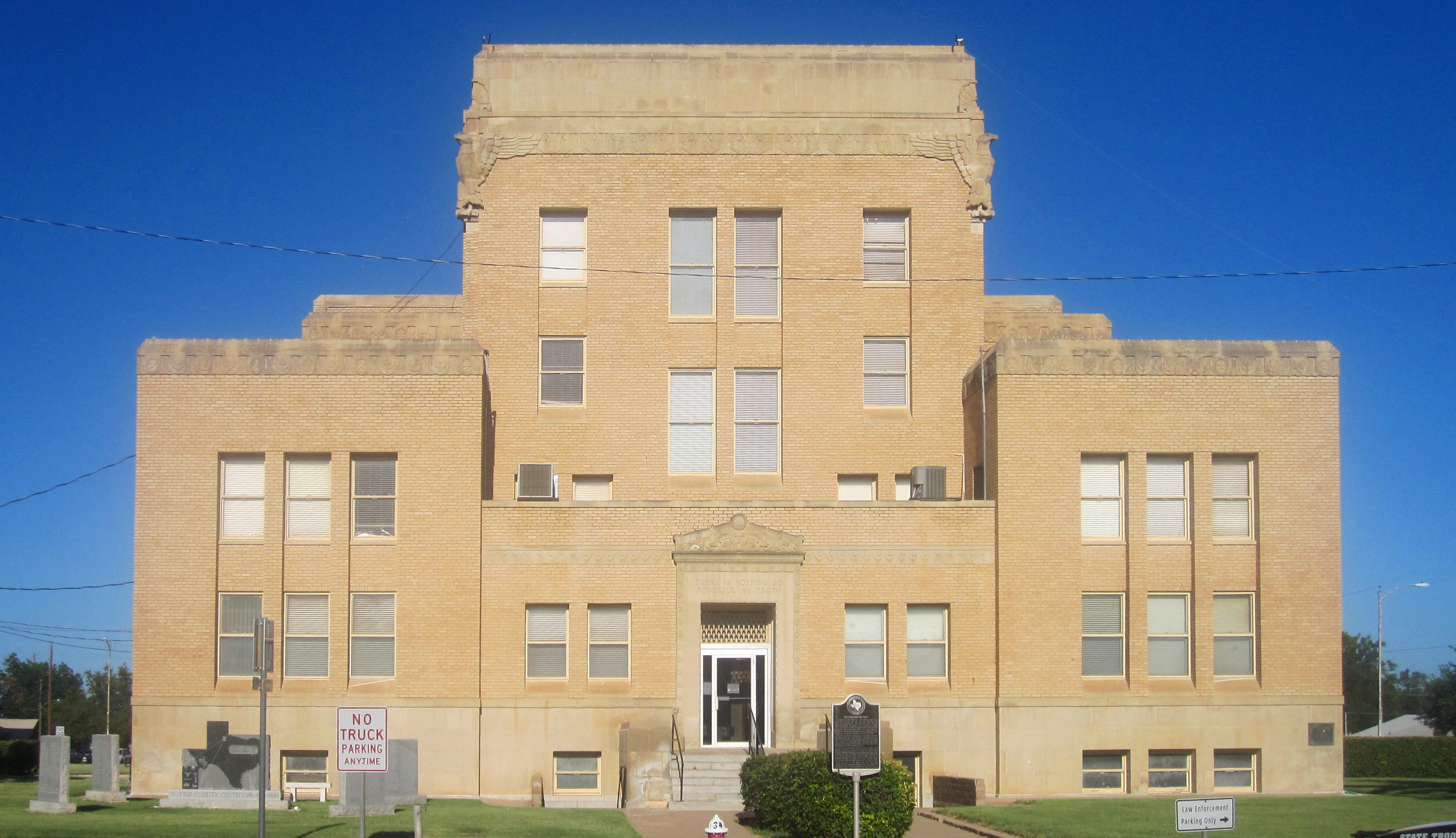
- Cottle County Courthouse in 2010

- Location within Texas Location within the United States
- Location: Roughly bounded by N. 7th, N. 10th, Garrett and Easly Sts., Paducah, Texas
- Coordinates: 34°0′50″N 100°18′5″W
- Area: 13.86 acres (5.61 ha)
- Built: 1930
- Built by: H.W. Underhill Construction Co.
- Architect: Voelcker & Dixon
- Architectural style: Mediterranean Revival, Spanish Revival, Commercial Style, Art Deco
- NRHP reference No.: 04000948
- Added to NRHP: September 10, 2004

The Cottle County Courthouse Historic District is a 13.9 acres (5.6 ha) historic district in Paducah, Texas which is roughly bounded by N. 7th, N. 10th, Garrett and Easly Streets. It was listed on the National Register of Historic Places in 2004. The listing included 40 contributing buildings and seven contributing structures. The eponymous courthouse, the district's central landmark, is a State Antiquities Landmark (SAL) and a Recorded Texas Historic Landmark (RTHL).

It is commanded by the four-story Art Deco Cottle County Courthouse (SAL #8200003008, 2005; RTHL #13447, 2005), designed by Wichita Falls architects Voelcker and Dixon during 1929-30.

It also includes construction by H.W. Underhill. It includes at least one hotel. It includes Mission/Spanish Revival architecture and Early Commercial architecture.

The site also includes 13 non-contributing buildings, a non-contributing site, two non-contributing structures, and four non-contributing objects.

== See also ==
- National Register of Historic Places listings in Cottle County, Texas
- Recorded Texas Historic Landmarks in Cottle County
- List of county courthouses in Texas
