= Lake Village Post Office =

- U.S. National Register of Historic Places
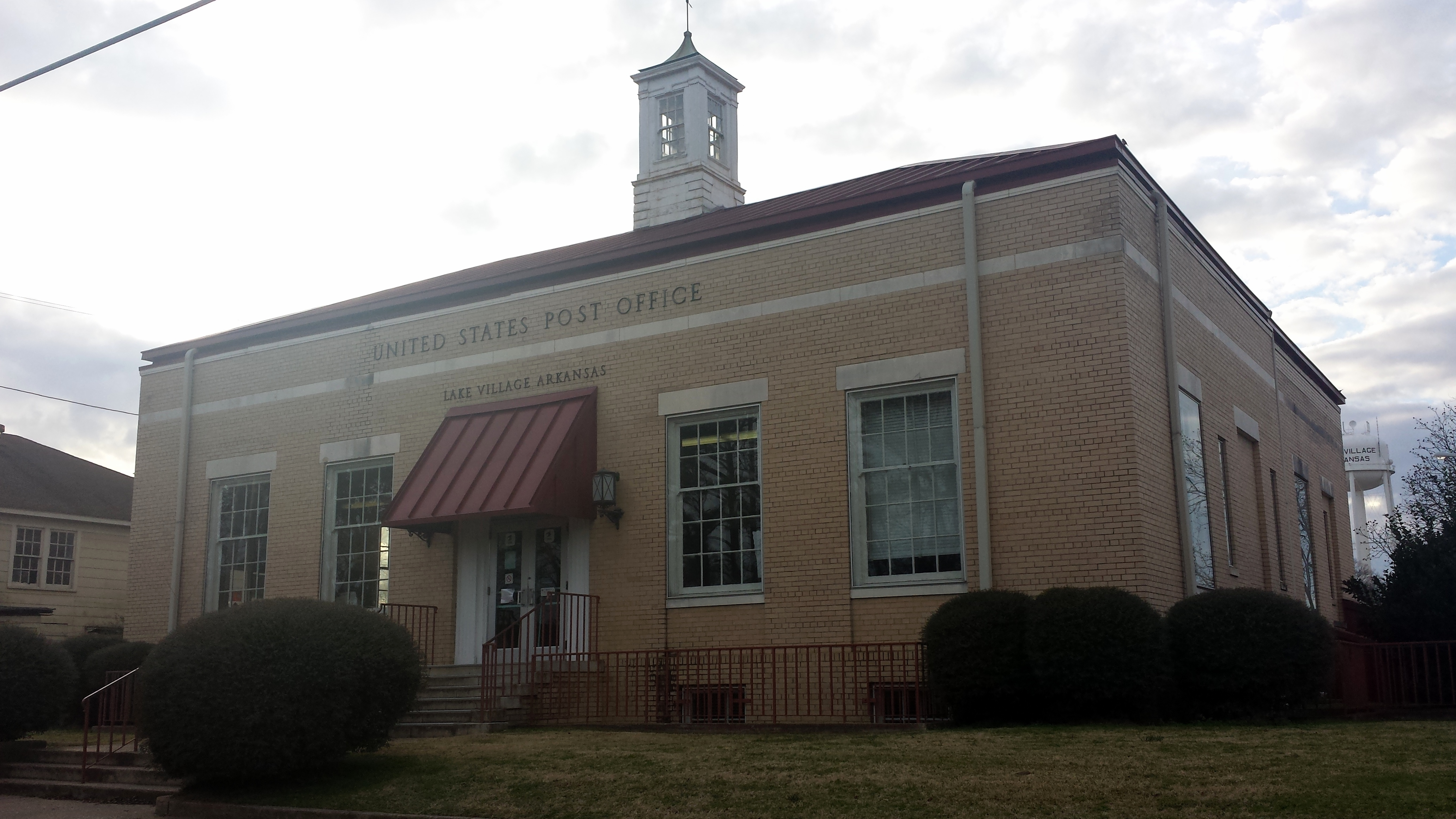

- Location within Arkansas Location within the United States
- Location: 206 S. Cokley St., Lake Village, Arkansas
- Coordinates: 33°19′49″N 91°17′0″W
- Area: less than one acre
- Built: 1938
- Architect: Office of the Supervising Architect under Louis A. Simon
- Mural artist: Avery Johnson
- Architectural style: Colonial Revival
- MPS: Post Offices with Section Art in Arkansas MPS
- NRHP reference No.: 98000916
- Added to NRHP: August 14, 1998

The Lake Village Post Office is a historic post office at 206 South Cokley Street in Lake Village, Arkansas. The single-story brick Colonial Revival building was built c. 1939; it is roughly square in shape, with a four-sided cupola topped by a bell-cast roof and pyramid. The interior features a mural drawn by Avery Johnson and installed in 1941; it was financed by the Treasury Department's Section of Fine Arts, and depicts cypress trees and deer.

The building was listed on the National Register of Historic Places in 1998.

== See also ==
- National Register of Historic Places listings in Chicot County, Arkansas
- List of United States post offices
- List of United States post office murals
