= Gregory Dipping Vat =

- U.S. National Register of Historic Places
- Location within Arkansas Location within the United States
- Location: 122 Rogers Rd., Lake Village, Arkansas
- Coordinates: 33°18′50″N 91°19′55″W
- Area: less than one acre
- Built: 1930
- MPS: Dip That Tick:Texas Tick Fever Eradication in Arkansas MPS
- NRHP reference No.: 06000830
- Added to NRHP: September 20, 2006

The Gregory Dipping Vat is a historic cattle dipping facility at 122 Rogers Street on the outskirts of Lake Village, Arkansas. The vat is a concrete structure 27 feet (8.2 m) long, 4 feet (1.2 m) wide, and 7 feet (2.1 m) deep. It is located on a grassy lane off Rogers Road, in a wooded area not far from Bayou Macon, whose waters were used to fill it. The vat was built c. 1930 as part of a statewide program to eradicate Texas tick fever, which was at the time a serious problem affecting the area's cattle farmers. After the program was ended in 1943, the vat became a play area for local youth. It remains in good condition as a reminder of the economically important tick eradication program.

The vat was listed on the National Register of Historic Places in 2006.

== See also ==
- National Register of Historic Places listings in Chicot County, Arkansas
