= Jack County Courthouse =

- U.S. National Register of Historic Places
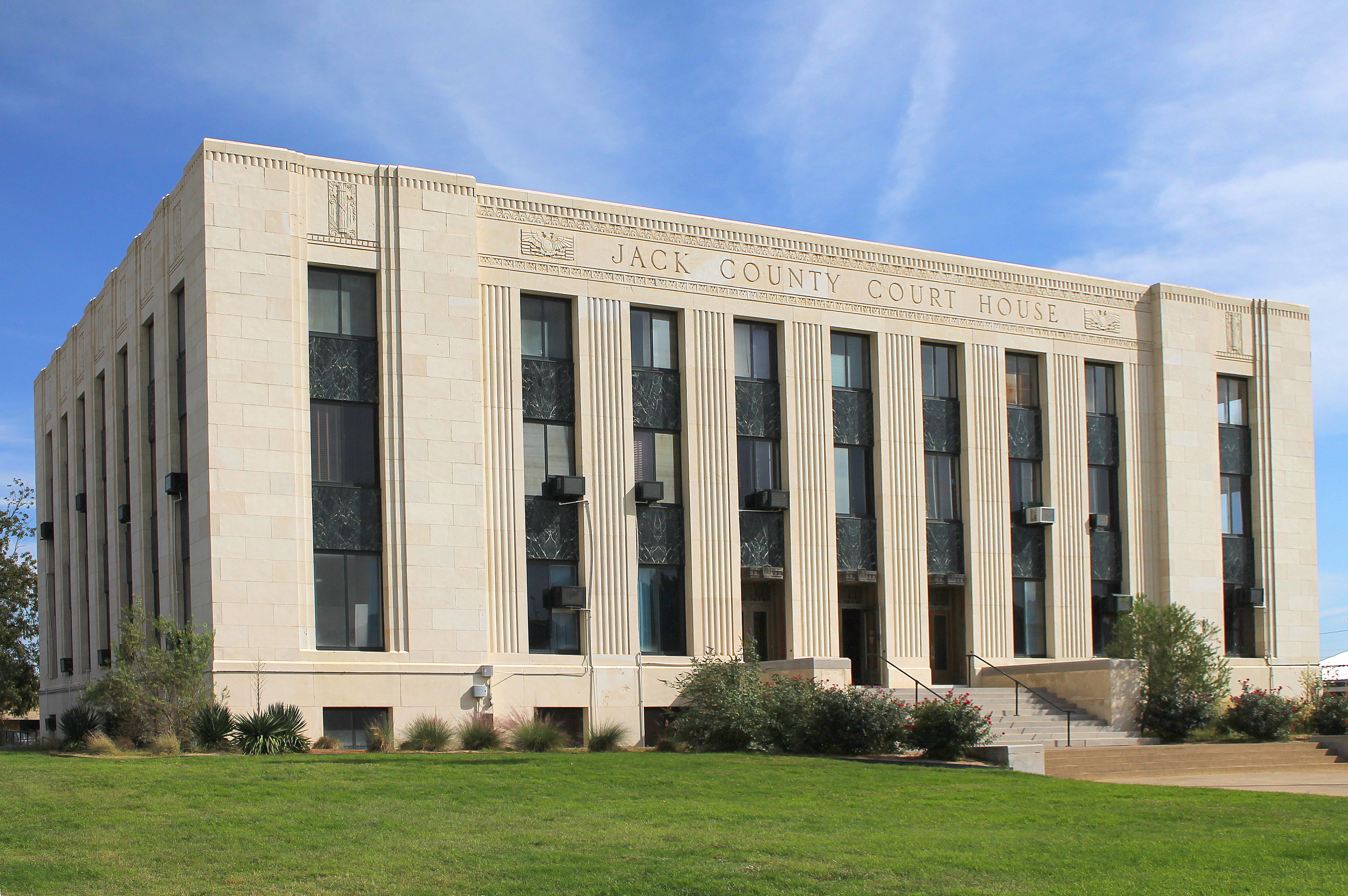
- Jack County Courthouse in 2014

- Location within Texas Location within the United States
- Interactive map showing the location of Jack County Courthouse
- Location: 100 N. Main St., Jacksboro, Texas
- Coordinates: 33°13′8″N 98°9′29″W
- Area: 5.7 acres (2.3 ha)
- Built: 1939-1940
- Built by: Eckert-Fair Construction
- Architect: Voelker & Dixon
- Architectural style: Modern Classical
- NRHP reference No.: 12001002
- Added to NRHP: December 4, 2012

The Jack County Courthouse, at 100 N. Main St. in Jacksboro, Texas, was completed in 1940. It was designed in 1939 by Wichita Falls architects Voelker & Dixon. It was listed on the National Register of Historic Places in 2012.

It is a three-story building with basement, and has "remarkable" integrity according to its 2012 NRHP nomination, which states its "cast-in-place concrete structure is sheathed in Texas limestone with marble spandrels. The building is modernistic in its block massing and stylized details, and stands as a rich example of the Modem Classical Style, a contemporary interpretation of classical design, with fluted pilasters separating recessed vertically ranked window and spandrel bays, and an entablature with low relief sculpture. The rich interior spaces and finishes are largely intact, including the original decorative light fixtures, stone and wood paneled wall veneers, decorative moldings, door hardware, duct covers, and aluminum cashier window screens. The courthouse exterior and interior retain a very high degree of architectural integrity."

The courthouse is the fourth courthouse building to have served the county. It replaced an 1885 courthouse. The first courthouse was established in 1858 in an already-existing wooden building on the west side of the Jacksboro town square, which was remodeled at cost of $800.

== See also ==
- National Register of Historic Places listings in Jack County, Texas
- List of county courthouses in Texas
