= Grand Lake, Arkansas =

Unincorporated community in Arkansas, U.S.

Grand Lake
- Unincorporated community
- Location within Arkansas
- Coordinates: 33°5′34.8″N 91°12′39.6″W
- Country: United States
- State: Arkansas
- County: Chicot

Grand Lake is an unincorporated community in Chicot County in the U.S. state of Arkansas.

== History ==
The town served as a docking point for boats on the Mississippi River prior to the American Civil War. It was also the location of a plantation owned by Isaac H. Hilliard in the Antebellum South.

The A. Landi General Merchandise Building is listed on the National Register of Historic Places.
