= Walter Garland Streett =

American politician (1868–1932

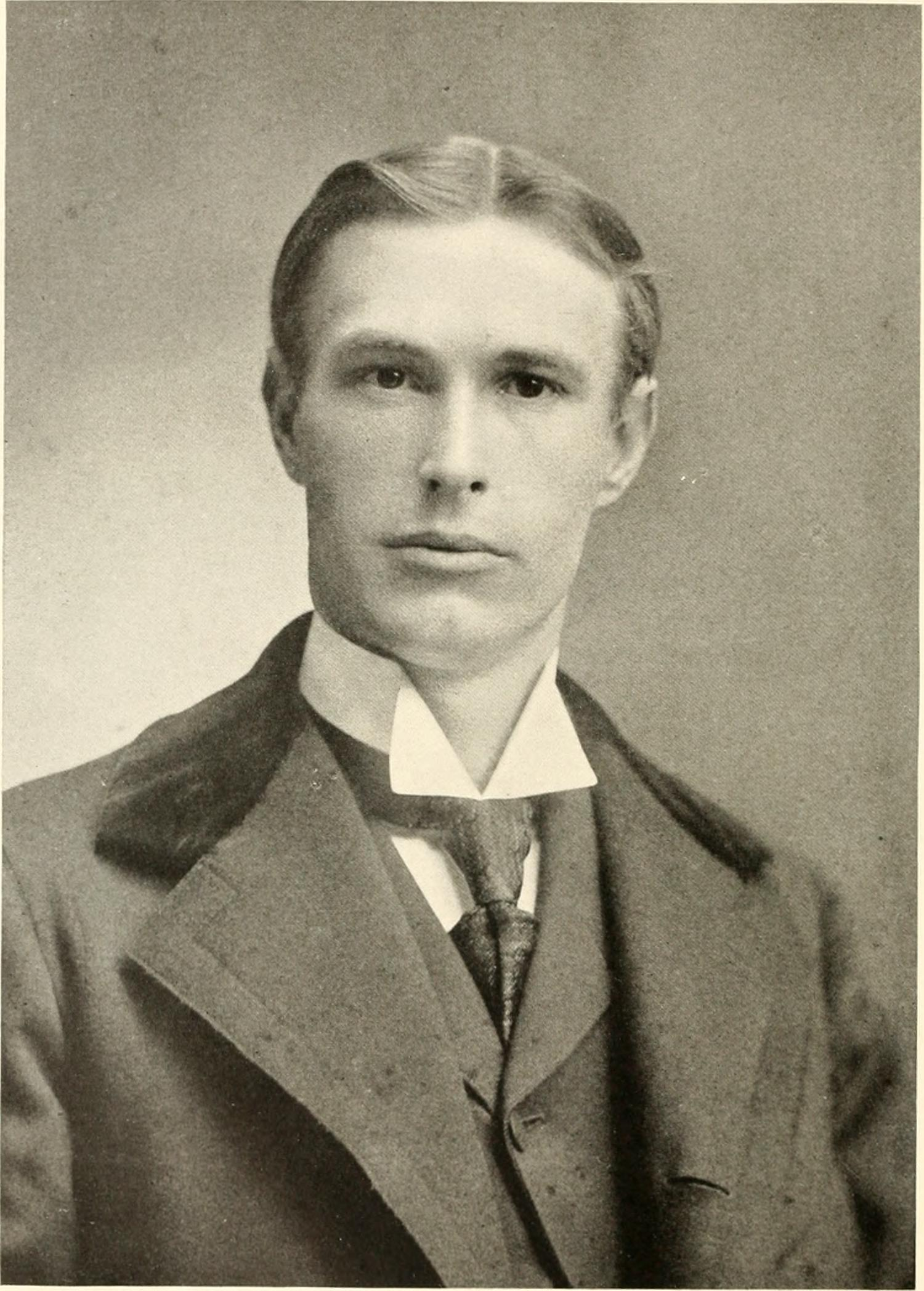
- Streett in a 1911 publication

Member of the Arkansas House of Representatives
- In office 1898–1900

Personal details
- Born: February 1, 1868 Lake Village, Arkansas, U.S.
- Died: June 11, 1932 (aged 64) Eudora, Arkansas, U.S.
- Resting place: Lake Village, Arkansas, U.S.
- Spouse: Woodie Johnson (m. 1897)
- Children: 5
- Education: Christian Brothers College (BA); Georgetown University
- Occupation: Politician; lawyer

Walter Garland Streett (February 1, 1868 – June 11, 1932) was an American politician and lawyer from Arkansas. He served in the Arkansas House of Representatives.

== Early life ==
Walter Garland Streett was born on February 1, 1868, in Lake Village, Arkansas, as one of three sons to Julia (née Reid) and William B. Streett. His father was a major in the Confederate Army and a lawyer. He attended public schools and graduated from Christian Brothers College in Memphis, Tennessee, in 1886 with a Bachelor of Arts. He then took a two year classical course at Georgetown University. He studied law in his father's Lake Village office and was admitted to the bar of the state supreme court in May 1889.

== Career ==
Streett was law partners with his father until 1893. He then moved to Pine Bluff and started a partnership with Hercules King Cannon White. In 1899, he left the partnership following the death of Streett's father.

In 1897, Streett was elected to represent Jefferson County in the Arkansas House of Representatives. He served as judge of Chicot County for one term.

Streett was affiliated in practicing law with Smith C. Martin. In December 1898, he formed the law firm Foster & Streett with H. R. C. Foster. Streett was senior member of the law firm Streett, Burnside & Streett of Lake Village, Eudora, and Camden. In his later years, he was active in obtaining levee relief from the government.

== Personal life ==
Streett married Woodie Johnson, daughter of J. B. Johnson and granddaughter of Hermon Carlton, of Pine Bluff on June 23, 1897. They had five children, Bruce, Duval, William B., Patricia, and Julia.

Streett died on June 11, 1932, at his home in Eudora. He was buried in a cemetery in Lake Village.
