= Dermott Commercial Historic District =

Historic district in Arkansas, United States

- U.S. National Register of Historic Places
- U.S. Historic district
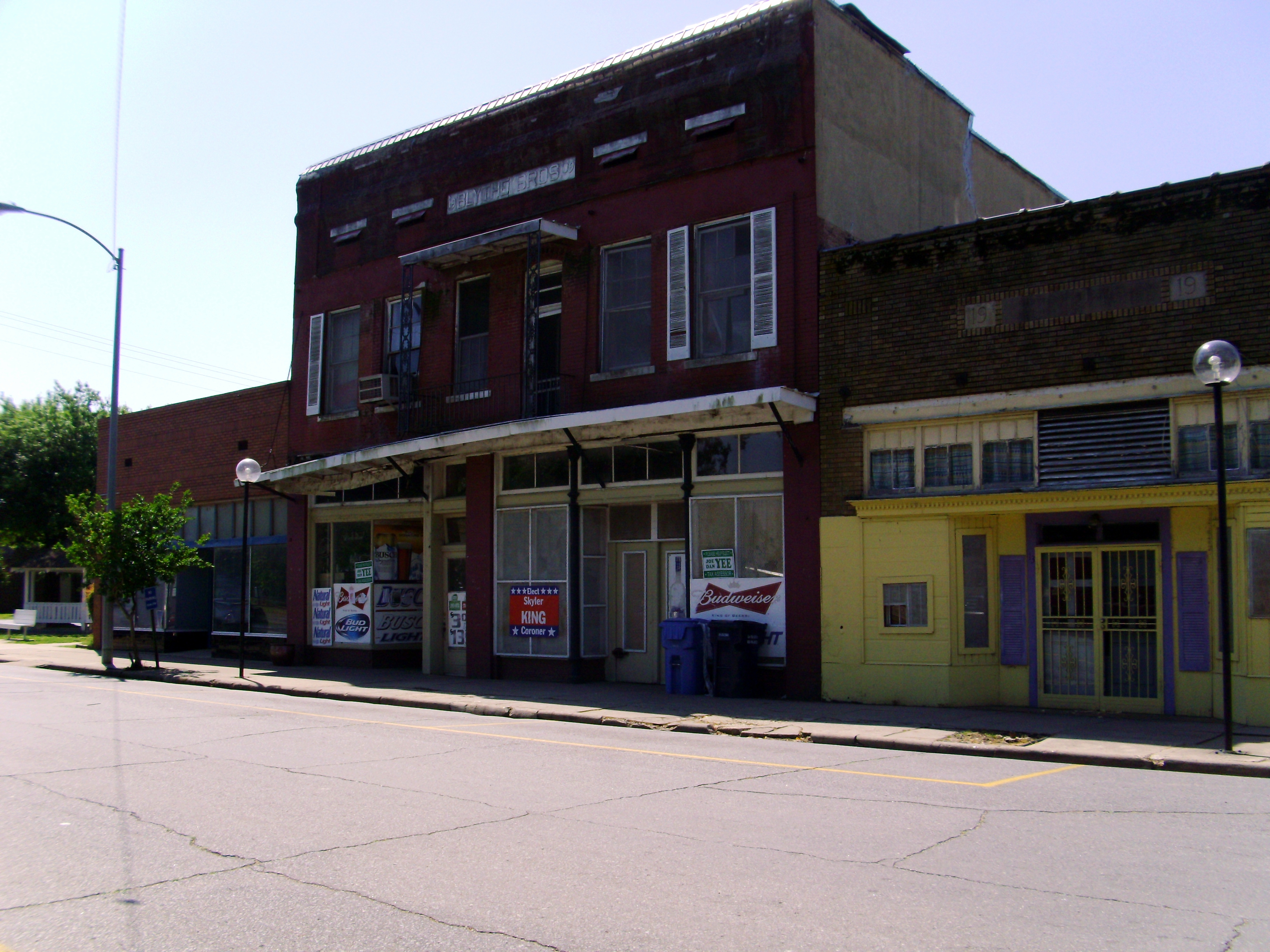

- Location within Arkansas Location within the United States
- Location: 101-120 N. Freeman St.; 101-219 E. Iowa St. and 131 N. Main St., Dermott, Arkansas
- Coordinates: 33°31′40″N 91°26′5″W
- Area: 4.15 acres (1.68 ha)
- Built: 1908
- NRHP reference No.: 10000789
- Added to NRHP: September 23, 2010

The Dermott Commercial Historic District encompasses the historic commercial heart of the rural community of Dermott, Arkansas, in the Mississippi River delta region of southeastern Arkansas. The Dermott area was settled in the 1840s, and the town was by the 1880s a thriving railroad town. The commercial district was developed principally in the first three decades of the 20th century. The district consists of three city blocks: two on East Iowa Street and one on North Freeman Street. The oldest building is the Bordeaux building at 209 East Iowa.

The district was listed on the National Register of Historic Places in 2010.

== See also ==
- National Register of Historic Places listings in Chicot County, Arkansas
