= Dermott Bank & Trust Company Building =

- U.S. National Register of Historic Places
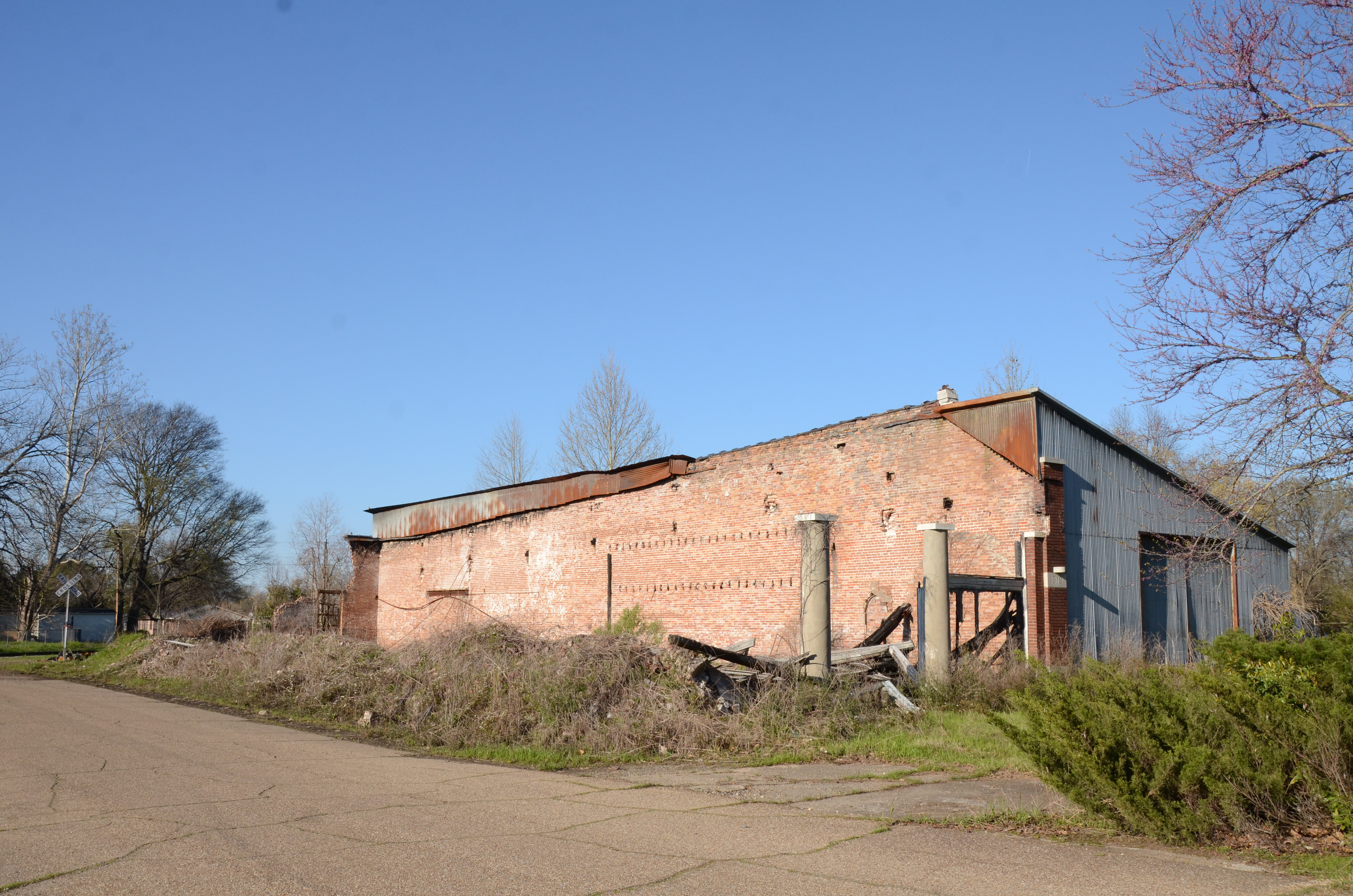
- All that remains of the building.

- Location within Arkansas Location within the United States
- Location: NW corner of N. Arkansas and E. Iowa Sts., Dermott, Arkansas
- Coordinates: 33°31′41″N 91°26′1″W
- Area: less than one acre
- Built: 1910
- Architectural style: Classical Revival
- NRHP reference No.: 94000466
- Added to NRHP: May 19, 1994

The Dermott Bank & Trust Company Building is a historic commercial building at the northwestern corner of the junction of North Arkansas and East Iowa Streets in Dermott, Arkansas. The single story Classical Revival building was home to the Dermott Bank & Trust Company, a bank that operated under various guises between 1911 and 1931, apparently all at this address. It later served as part of a building supply store, and as a warehouse.

The building was listed on the National Register of Historic Places in 1994.

== See also ==
- National Register of Historic Places listings in Chicot County, Arkansas
