= National Register of Historic Places listings in Jack County, Texas =

Location of Jack County in Texas

This is a list of the National Register of Historic Places listings in Jack County, Texas.

This is intended to be a complete list of properties listed on the National Register of Historic Places in Jack County, Texas. Two properties are listed on the national register in the county, including one National Historic Landmark, which is also designated as a state historic site and state antiquities landmark and includes recorded Texas historic landmarks within.

This National Park Service list is complete through NPS recent listings posted July 11, 2025.

== Current listings ==
The locations of national register properties may be seen in a mapping service provided.

	Name on the Register	Image	Date listed	Location	City or town	Description
1	Fort Richardson	Fort Richardson	October 15, 1966 (#66000816)	228 Park Road 61; 33°12′25″N 98°09′50″W	Jacksboro	State Historic Site, State Antiquities Landmark, contains Recorded Texas Historic Landmarks; established 1867, abandoned 1878, renovated and reopened 1973 as historic park.
2	Jack County Courthouse	Jack County Courthouse	December 4, 2012 (#12001002)	100 N Main St. 33°13′08″N 98°09′29″W	Jacksboro	

== Former listings ==
	Name on the Register	Image	Date listed	Date removed	Location	City or town	Description
1	James W. Knox House		April 9, 1979 (#79002981)	October 22, 1992	215 Knox Street	Jacksboro	Destroyed by fire on November 10, 1991.

== See also ==
- National Register of Historic Places listings in Texas
- List of National Historic Landmarks in Texas
- List of Texas State Historic Sites
- Recorded Texas Historic Landmarks in Jack County
