= John Tushek Building =

- U.S. National Register of Historic Places
- U.S. Historic district – Contributing property
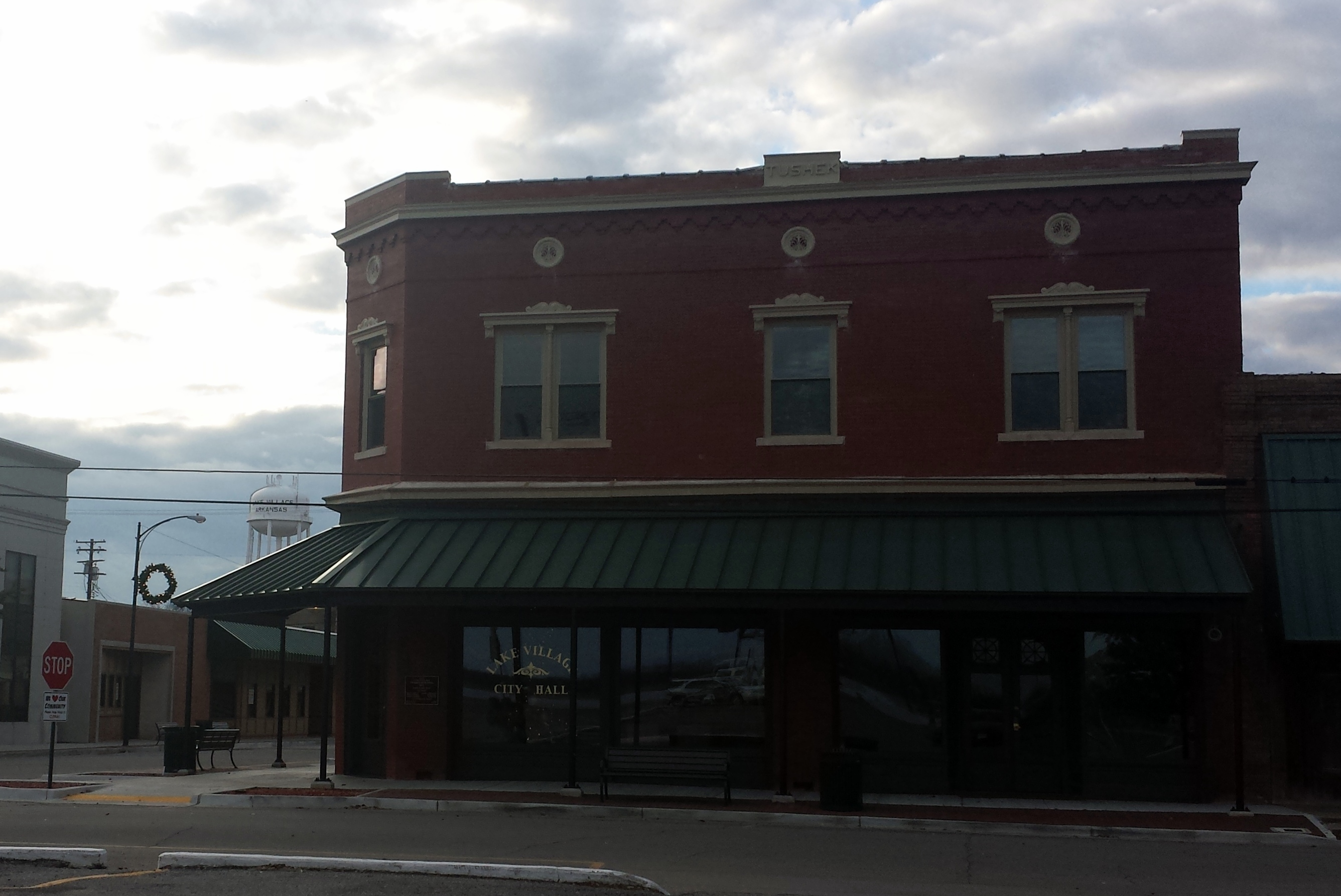

- Location within Arkansas Location within the United States
- Location: 108 Main St., Lake Village, Arkansas
- Coordinates: 33°19′53″N 91°16′57″W
- Area: less than one acre
- Built: 1906
- Architectural style: Beaux Arts
- Part of: Lake Village Commercial Historic District (ID11000025)
- NRHP reference No.: 93000811

Significant dates
- Added to NRHP: August 5, 1993
- Designated CP: February 18, 2011

The John Tushek Building is a historic commercial building at 108 Main Street in Lake Village, Arkansas. The two story brick building was built in 1906 by John Tushek, an Austro-Hungarian immigrant who ran a mercantile store on the premises. The building has vernacular Beaux Arts styling popular at the time, presenting facades to both Main and Court Streets. The ground floors of these facades are divided into storefronts with large glass windows, with access to the upper floor offices via an entrance on the corner. The second floor windows are capped with decorative metal crowns, and topped by small oculus windows. The facade is topped by a corbelled brick cornice and parapet.

The building was listed on the National Register of Historic Places in 1993, and included in the Lake Village Commercial Historic District in 2011.

== See also ==
- National Register of Historic Places listings in Chicot County, Arkansas
