= M.E. Davis House =

Historic house in Arkansas, United States

- U.S. National Register of Historic Places
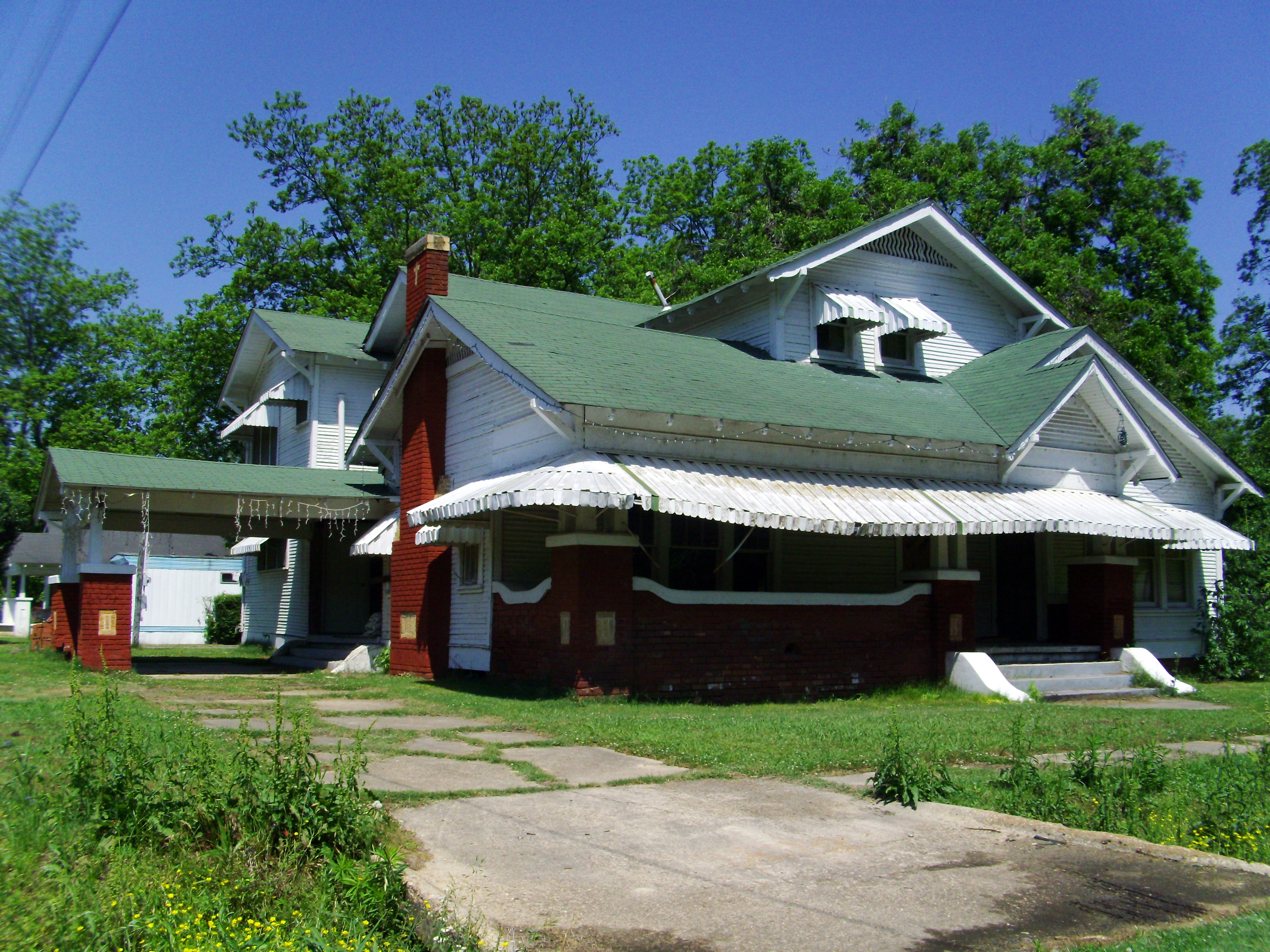

- Location within Arkansas Location within the United States
- Location: 200 N. Knox St., Dermott, Arkansas
- Coordinates: 33°31′47″N 91°26′27″W
- Area: less than one acre
- Built: 1925
- Architectural style: Bungalow/craftsman
- MPS: Ethnic and Racial Minority Settlement of the Arkansas Delta MPS
- NRHP reference No.: 04001034
- Added to NRHP: September 22, 2004

The M. E. Davis House is a historic house at 200 North Knox Street in Dermott, Arkansas. The two story wood-frame house was built in 1925, and is one of the largest houses in Dermott; it is still one of only a few two story houses there. The Craftsman style house was built for Matthew E. Davis, an African-American businessman. Davis was notable in the town for opening his home to impoverished African-Americans leaving the sugar cane plantations by train, and helping them find work in the local mills and acquire their own homes.

The house was listed on the National Register of Historic Places in 2004.

As a youth growing up in Dermott also living on Knox Street I use to mow this yard on the weekend for $5.00. A good friend would let me borrow their lawnmower and it took me all morning, but I got the job done. Five ($5), that was a lot of money for an eight or nine-year-old child in the mid 60's.

== See also ==
- National Register of Historic Places listings in Chicot County, Arkansas
