= Crenshaw-Burleigh House =

Historic house in Arkansas, United States

- U.S. National Register of Historic Places
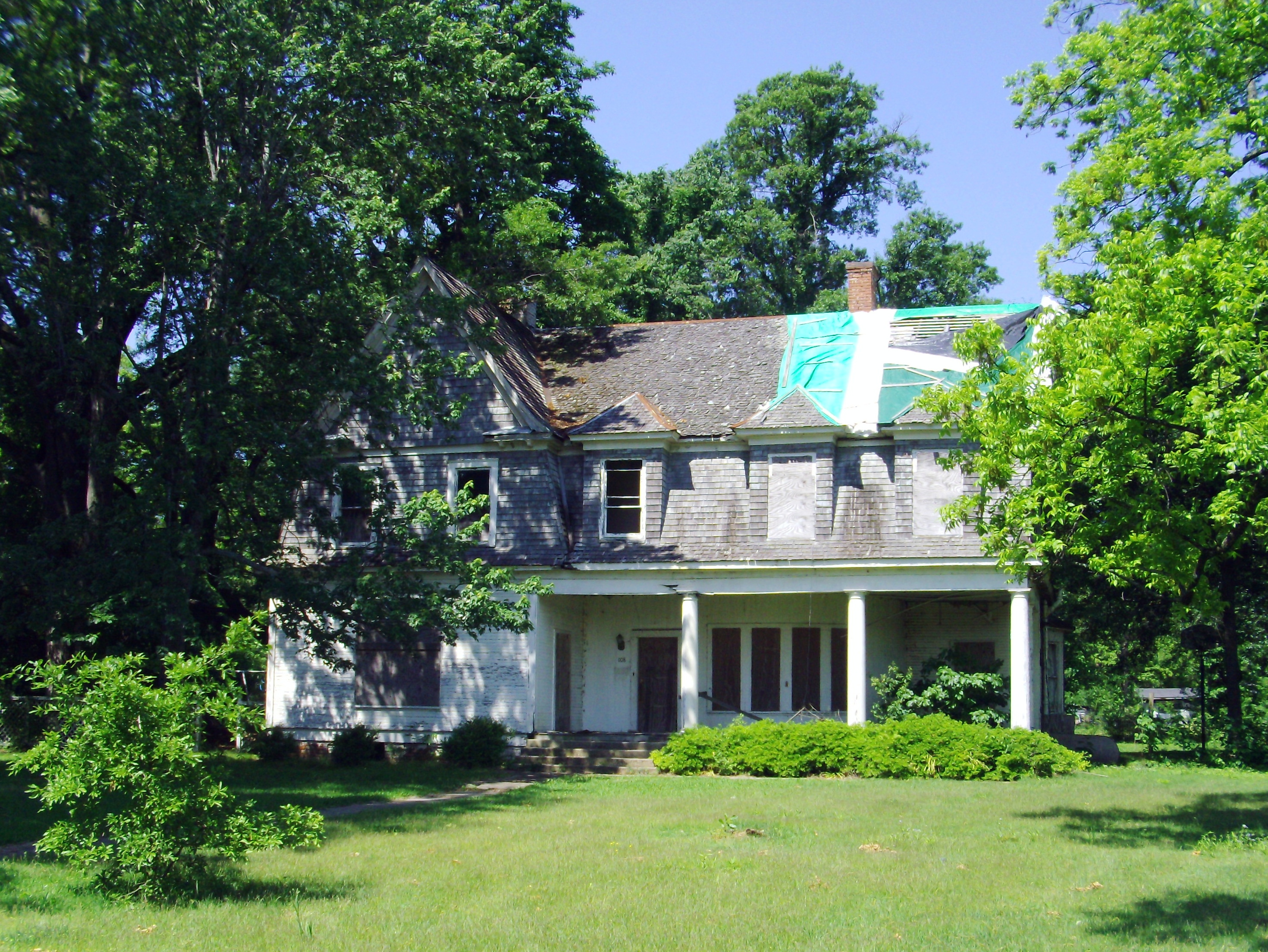

- Location within Arkansas Location within the United States
- Location: 108 N. Main St., Dermott, Arkansas
- Coordinates: 33°31′37″N 91°26′12″W
- Area: less than one acre
- Built: 1905
- Architectural style: Colonial Revival
- NRHP reference No.: 11001047
- Added to NRHP: January 27, 2012

The Crenshaw-Burleigh House is a historic house at 108 North Main Street in Dermott, Arkansas. The two story wood-frame house was built in 1903 to replace the Crenshaw house that burned in 1902, and is a distinctive early example of Colonial Revival architecture. Its first owner was Anna Crawford Crenshaw, granddaughter of Hon William Harris Crawford; its second owners were James Sherer Burleigh and Mattie Crenshaw Burleigh (Anna's daughter). The house has a gambrel roof with cross gables, and a wraparound porch supported by Tuscan columns. The second floor, built into the steep section of the gambrel roof has gable dormers with architrave surrounds. An elevator was added by the Burleighs after Sherer had a heart attack. Mattie Burleigh lived here until her death in 1970.

The house was listed on the National Register of Historic Places in 2012.

== See also ==
- National Register of Historic Places listings in Chicot County, Arkansas
