= Lake Village Confederate Monument =

- U.S. National Register of Historic Places
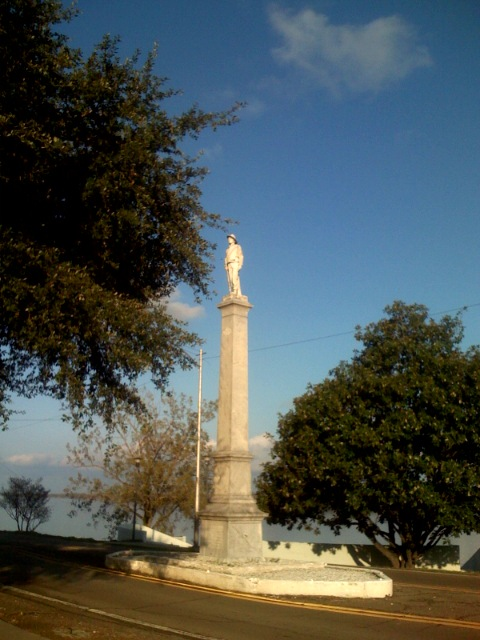

- Location within Arkansas Location within the United States
- Location: Lakeshore Dr. median, between Main and Jackson Sts., Lake Village, Arkansas
- Coordinates: 33°19′51″N 91°17′5″W
- Area: less than one acre
- Built: 1910
- Architectural style: Classical Revival
- MPS: Civil War Commemorative Sculpture MPS
- NRHP reference No.: 96000509
- Added to NRHP: May 3, 1996

The Lake Village Confederate Monument is located on the median of Lakeshore Drive, between Main and Jackson Streets in Lake Village, Arkansas. The marble monument depicts a Confederate Army soldier standing in mid stride with his left foot forward. His right hand holds the barrel of a rifle, whose butt rests on the monument base. He carries a bedroll draped over his left shoulder, and wears a Confederate cap. A cannon that served as a fountain was once part of the sculpture, but is now missing. The statue is about 6 feet (1.8 m) high and 2 feet (0.61 m) square; it rests on a marble foundation that is 20 feet (6.1 m) long, 12 feet (3.7 m) wide, and 8 feet (2.4 m) high. The monument was erected in 1910 by two chapters of the United Daughters of the Confederacy at a cost of about $3,000.

The base has inscriptions on its east and west faces. The east face, or rear, reads "Erected by the / Captain McConnell / and / George K. Cracraft / Chapters, U.D.C. / A.D. 1910 / And Chicot County" / "We care not whence / They came, / Dear, in lifeless clay / Whether unknown or known to fame / Their cause and country still the same / They died and wore the gray. / Father Ryan." The west face, or front, reads "1861-1865 CSA / To the Confederate soldiers of Chicot / County, the record of whose sublime / Self sacrifice and undying devotion / Is the proud heritage / Of a loyal posterity."

The monument was listed on the National Register of Historic Places in 1996.

== See also ==
- National Register of Historic Places listings in Chicot County, Arkansas
