= Lake Village Commercial Historic District =

Historic district in Arkansas, United States

- U.S. National Register of Historic Places
- U.S. Historic district
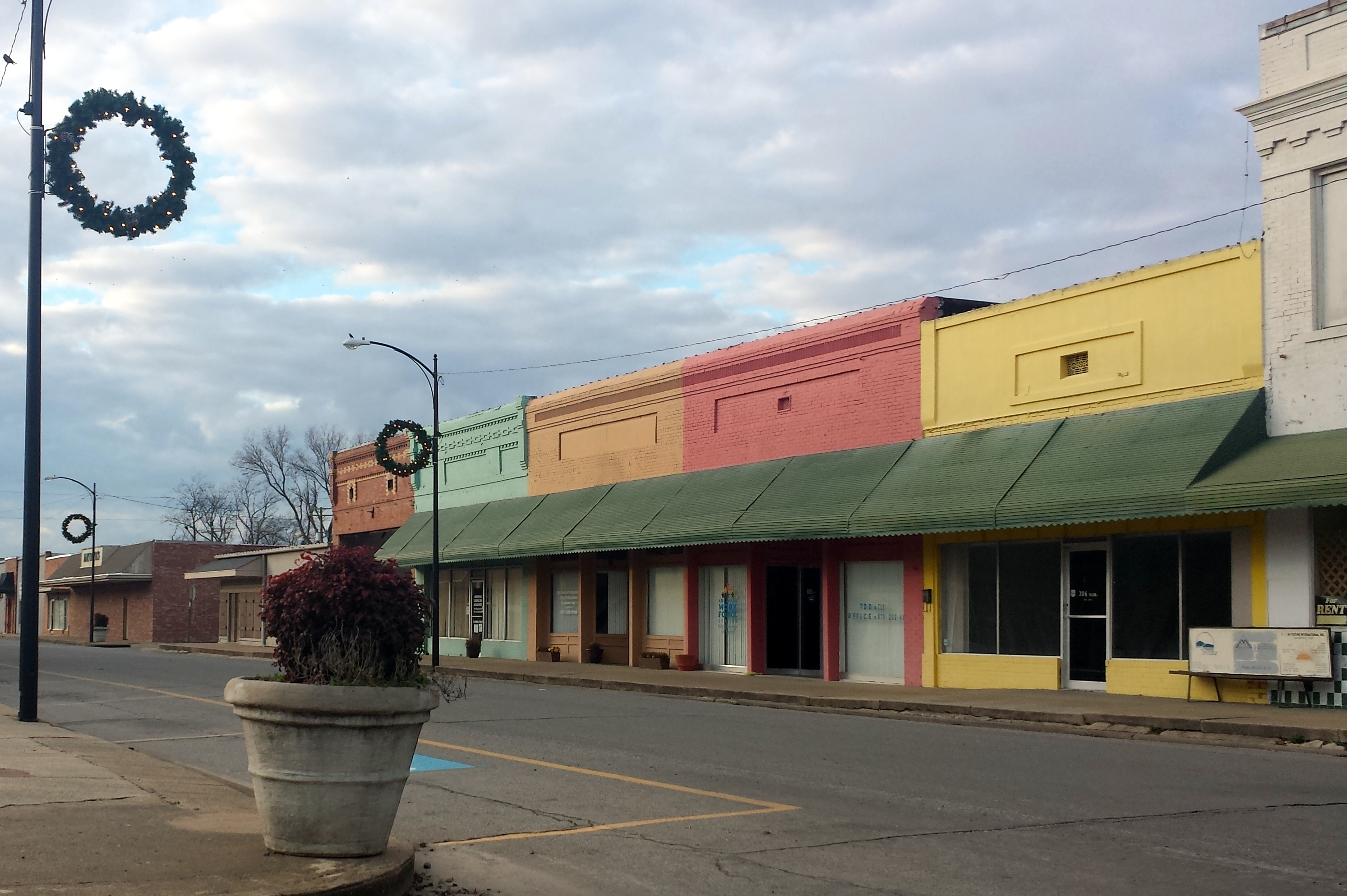

- Location within Arkansas Location within the United States
- Location: Roughly bounded by Lakeshore Dr., Jackson St., Chicot St., and Church St., Lake Village, Arkansas
- Coordinates: 33°19′52″N 91°16′58″W
- Area: 5.9 acres (2.4 ha)
- Built: 1906
- NRHP reference No.: 11000025
- Added to NRHP: February 18, 2011

The Lake Village Commercial Historic District encompasses the historic commercial heart of Lake Village, Arkansas, the county seat of Chicot County in the Mississippi River delta region of southeastern Arkansas. The district covers about six square blocks of downtown Lake Village, bounded roughly by Jackson Street to the north, Lakeshore Drive to the east, Church Street to the south, and Chicot Street to the west. This area represents the growth of Lake Village during its period of greatest prosperity, between 1906 and 1960. The city's growth was spurred by the arrival of the railroad in 1903, and most of the district's buildings were built between 1900 and 1930. Most of the buildings are vernacular commercial buildings; the John Tushek Building at 202 Main Street is one interesting example of Beaux Arts styling, and 218–222 Main Street has some Italianate styling. The district includes the Lake Village Confederate Monument, which has been a local landmark since 1910.

The district was listed on the National Register of Historic Places in 2011.

== See also ==
- National Register of Historic Places listings in Chicot County, Arkansas
