= New Hope Missionary Baptist Church Cemetery =

Historic cemetery in Arkansas, United States

- New Hope Missionary Baptist Church Cemetery, Historic Section
- U.S. National Register of Historic Places
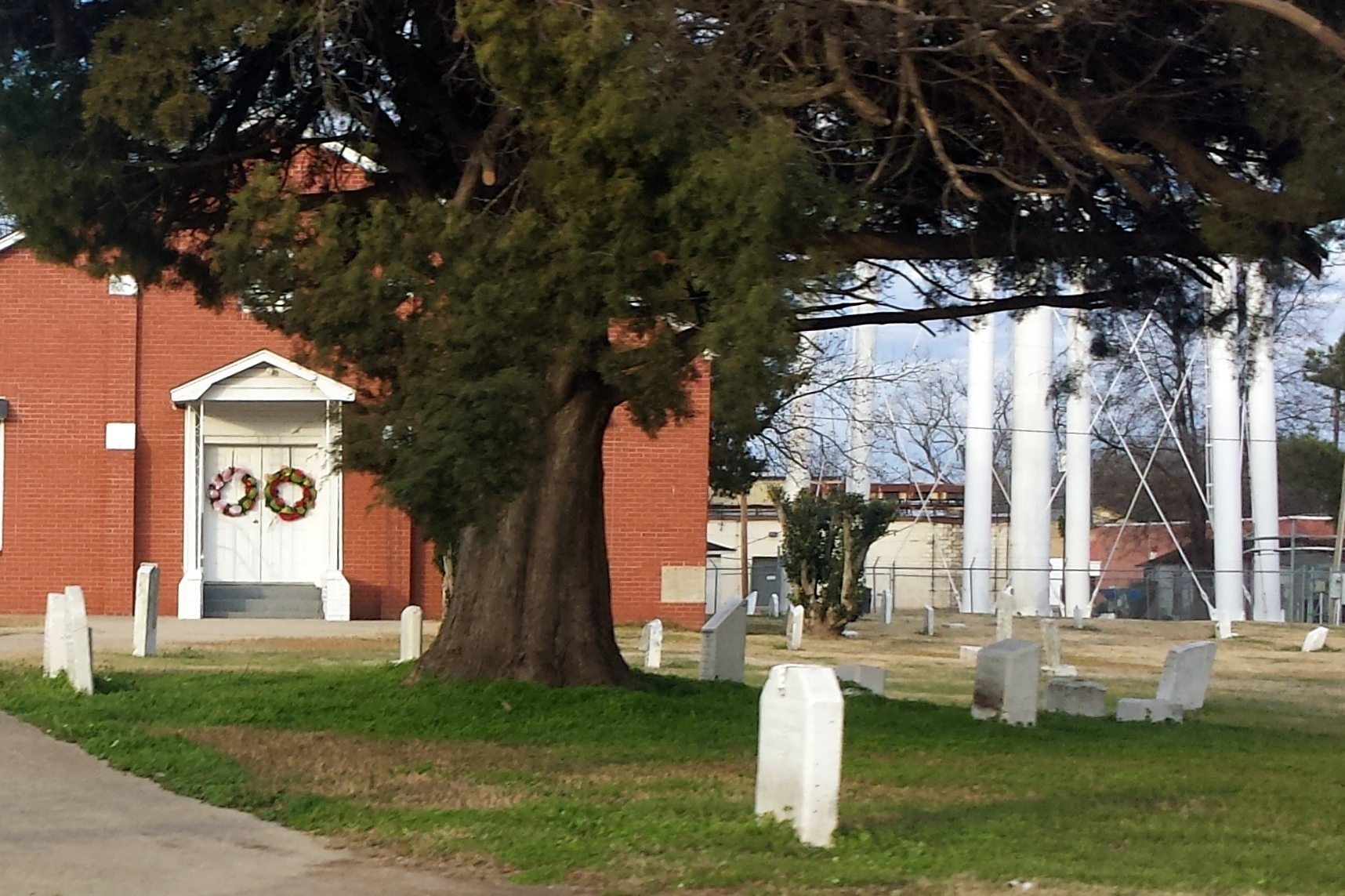
- Historic section of cemetery

- Location within Arkansas Location within the United States
- Location: St. Marys St., Lake Village, Arkansas
- Coordinates: 33°19′48″N 91°17′12″W
- Area: less than one acre
- MPS: Ethnic and Racial Minority Settlement of the Arkansas Delta MPS
- NRHP reference No.: 92001227
- Added to NRHP: September 21, 1992

The New Hope Missionary Baptist Church Cemetery is a cemetery on St. Marys Street in Lake Village, Arkansas. The cemetery is located adjacent to a modern church that is located on the site of churches that have served Lake Village's African American population since 1860.

The historic portion of the cemetery, east and south of the church, was added to the National Register of Historic Places in 1992. It is the only known site associated with the area's large African American population from the 19th century.
