= Jennie, Arkansas =

- Unincorporated community
- Location within Arkansas Location within the United States
- Coordinates: 33°15′22″N 91°17′10″W
- Country: United States
- State: Arkansas
- County: Chicot
- Elevation: 118 ft (36 m)
- Time zone: UTC-6 (Central (CST))
  - Summer (DST): UTC-5 (CDT)
- Area code: 870
- GNIS feature ID: 57987

Jennie is an unincorporated community in Chicot County, Arkansas, United States. The community is four miles south of Lake Village along Arkansas Highway 150. Fairview on Lake Chicot is approximately two miles to the northeast.
