= Lake Village, Arkansas =

City in the United States

- City
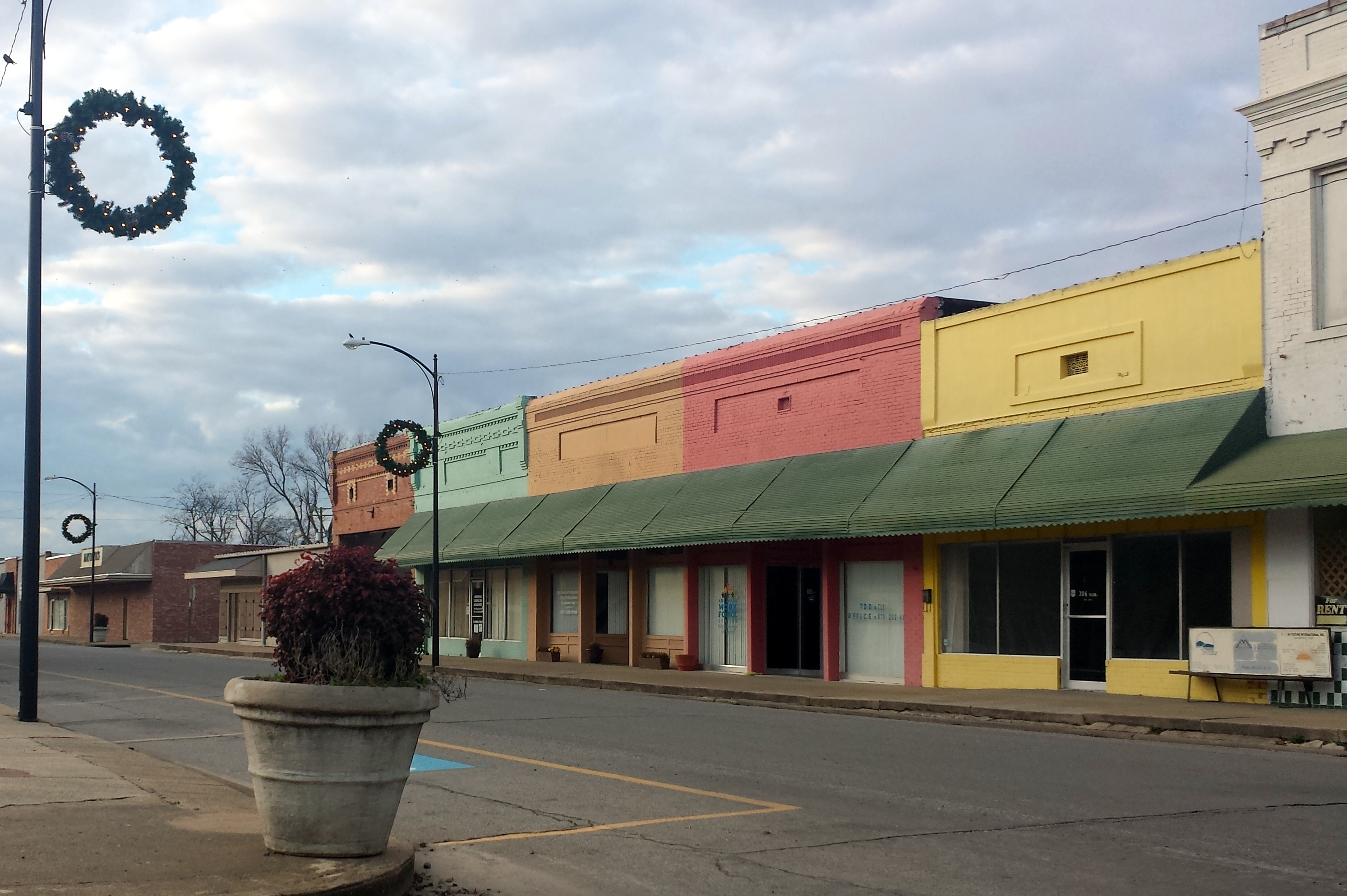
- Lake Village Commercial Historic District

- Location of Lake Village in Chicot County, Arkansas
- Coordinates: 33°19′44″N 91°17′05″W
- Country: United States
- State: Arkansas
- County: Chicot

Area
  - Total: 2.39 sq mi (6.19 km^{2})
  - Land: 2.39 sq mi (6.19 km^{2})
  - Water: 0 sq mi (0.00 km^{2})
- Elevation: 121 ft (37 m)

Population (2020)
  - Total: 2,065
  - Estimate (2025): 1,833 ▼
  - Density: 864.1/sq mi (333.65/km^{2})
- Time zone: UTC-6 (CDT)
  - Summer (DST): UTC-5 (CDT)
- ZIP code: 71653
- Area code: 870
- FIPS code: 05-38170
- GNIS feature ID: 2404868
- Website: lakevillagear.gov

Lake Village is a city in and the county seat of Chicot County, Arkansas, United States. As of the 2020 census, Lake Village had a population of 2,065. It is located in the Arkansas Delta. Lake Village is named for its location on Lake Chicot, an oxbow lake formed by the Mississippi River.

== History ==
According to legend, the remains of Spanish explorer Hernando de Soto might be buried under Lake Chicot. His expedition visited Guachoya, a native village along the edge of the lake, which is recorded as the site of his death (see list of sites and peoples visited by the Hernando de Soto Expedition).

Lake Village was later founded at this location by European-American colonists. The area was developed for cotton plantations, and the county seat was the center of government and county trading. The antebellum years were when the county generated its greatest wealth, at least for planters.

Solo pilot Charles Lindbergh made his first nighttime flight in April 1923 over Lake Chicot and Lake Village.

Lake Village has nine properties listed on the National Register of Historic Places: Carlton House, Chicot County Courthouse, Sam Epstein House, Gregory Dipping Vat, Lake Village Confederate Monument, Lake Village Post Office, Dr. E.P. McGehee Infirmary, New Hope Missionary Baptist Church Cemetery (Historic Section), and the John Tushek Building. In addition, the Lake Village Commercial Historic District is listed, as is the nearby Lakeport Plantation. The antebellum mansion of the latter is the only one in the state that is located near the Mississippi River.

== Geography ==
Lake Village is located north of the center of Chicot County and is situated on the west bank of Lake Chicot, a former course of the Mississippi River that is now an oxbow lake.

U.S. Routes 65 and 82 pass through the city. US 65 leads north 22 miles (35 km) to McGehee and south 17 miles (27 km) to Eudora, while US 82 leads west 31 miles (50 km) to Hamburg and east 21 miles (34 km) to Greenville, Mississippi. U.S. Route 278 follows US 65 north out of town and US 82 east to Mississippi.

According to the United States Census Bureau, Lake Village has a total area of 2.5 square miles (6.4 km^{2}), all land. The city is located in the southernmost section of the Delta Lowlands of Arkansas, and boasts scenic vistas of the Mississippi River.

== Demographics ==
Historical population
Census	Pop.	Note	%±
1910	1,074		—
1920	1,449		34.9%
1930	1,582		9.2%
1940	2,045		29.3%
1950	2,484		21.5%
1960	2,998		20.7%
1970	3,310		10.4%
1980	3,088		−6.7%
1990	2,791		−9.6%
2000	2,823		1.1%
2010	2,575		−8.8%
2020	2,065		−19.8%
2025 (est.)	1,833	▼	−11.2%
U.S. Decennial Census

=== 2020 census ===
As of the 2020 census, Lake Village had a population of 2,065. The median age was 43.1 years. 24.8% of residents were under the age of 18 and 20.0% were 65 or older. For every 100 females there were 87.4 males, and for every 100 females age 18 and over there were 80.0 males age 18 and over.

0.0% of residents lived in urban areas, while 100.0% lived in rural areas.

There were 918 households and 552 families. Of those households, 28.4% had children under the age of 18 living in them. Of all households, 27.3% were married-couple households, 22.0% were households with a male householder and no spouse or partner present, and 45.2% were households with a female householder and no spouse or partner present. About 39.5% of all households were made up of individuals, and 17.4% had someone living alone who was 65 years of age or older.

There were 1,105 housing units, of which 16.9% were vacant. The homeowner vacancy rate was 2.8% and the rental vacancy rate was 12.3%.

Racial composition as of the 2020 census
Race	Number	Percent
White	623	30.2%
Black or African American	1,293	62.6%
American Indian and Alaska Native	4	0.2%
Asian	20	1.0%
Native Hawaiian and Other Pacific Islander	0	0.0%
Some other race	64	3.1%
Two or more races	61	3.0%
Hispanic or Latino (of any race)	117	5.7%

=== 2000 census ===
As of the census of 2000, there were 2,823 people, 1,090 households, and 705 families residing in the city. The population density was 1,357.7 inhabitants per square mile (524.2/km^{2}). There were 1,233 housing units at an average density of 593.0 per square mile (229.0/km^{2}). The racial makeup of the city was 56.15% Black or African American, 40.74% White, 0.21% Native American, 1.13% Asian, 0.57% from other races, and 1.20% from two or more races. 1.38% of the population were Hispanic or Latino of any race.

There were 1,090 households, out of which 33.9% had children under the age of 18 living with them, 36.6% were married couples living together, 24.2% had a female householder with no husband present, and 35.3% were non-families. 32.6% of all households were made up of individuals, and 15.1% had someone living alone who was 65 years of age or older. The average household size was 2.49 and the average family size was 3.16.

In the city, the population was spread out, with 29.3% under the age of 18, 8.0% from 18 to 24, 25.5% from 25 to 44, 19.7% from 45 to 64, and 17.5% who were 65 years of age or older. The median age was 36 years. For every 100 females, there were 79.9 males. For every 100 females age 18 and over, there were 71.0 males.

The median income for a household in the city was $20,625, and the median income for a family was $28,438. Males had a median income of $37,031 versus $14,872 for females. The per capita income for the city was $12,677. About 29.1% of families and 36.1% of the population were below the poverty line, including 49.6% of those under age 18 and 24.5% of those age 65 or over.

== Economy ==
The economy of the area is based on agriculture. The crops grown are mainly cotton, soybeans and wheat. There is also a large aquacultural base, consisting mainly of catfish farmers. In addition, county government is an important employer as Lake Village is the county seat of Chicot County.

The state Tourist Information Center in Lake Village is located on a pier extending into Lake Chicot. It is the only tourist center in the state to be completely heated and cooled by solar energy. It is scheduled to be replaced by a more modern center.

== Education ==
Public education is provided by Lakeside School District, which leads to graduation from Lakeside High School.

The Southeast Arkansas Public Library operates the Lake Village Branch Library.

== Transportation ==
In June 2008, construction was completed to convert the two-lane combined highway of 82, 65 and 278 inside of the city limits of Lake Village into a four-lane highway, with an added stoplight and sidewalks on both sides of the road. There has been no indication of whether plans for widening the highway further south to the Greenville Bridge over the Mississippi are still viable, or when construction might begin.

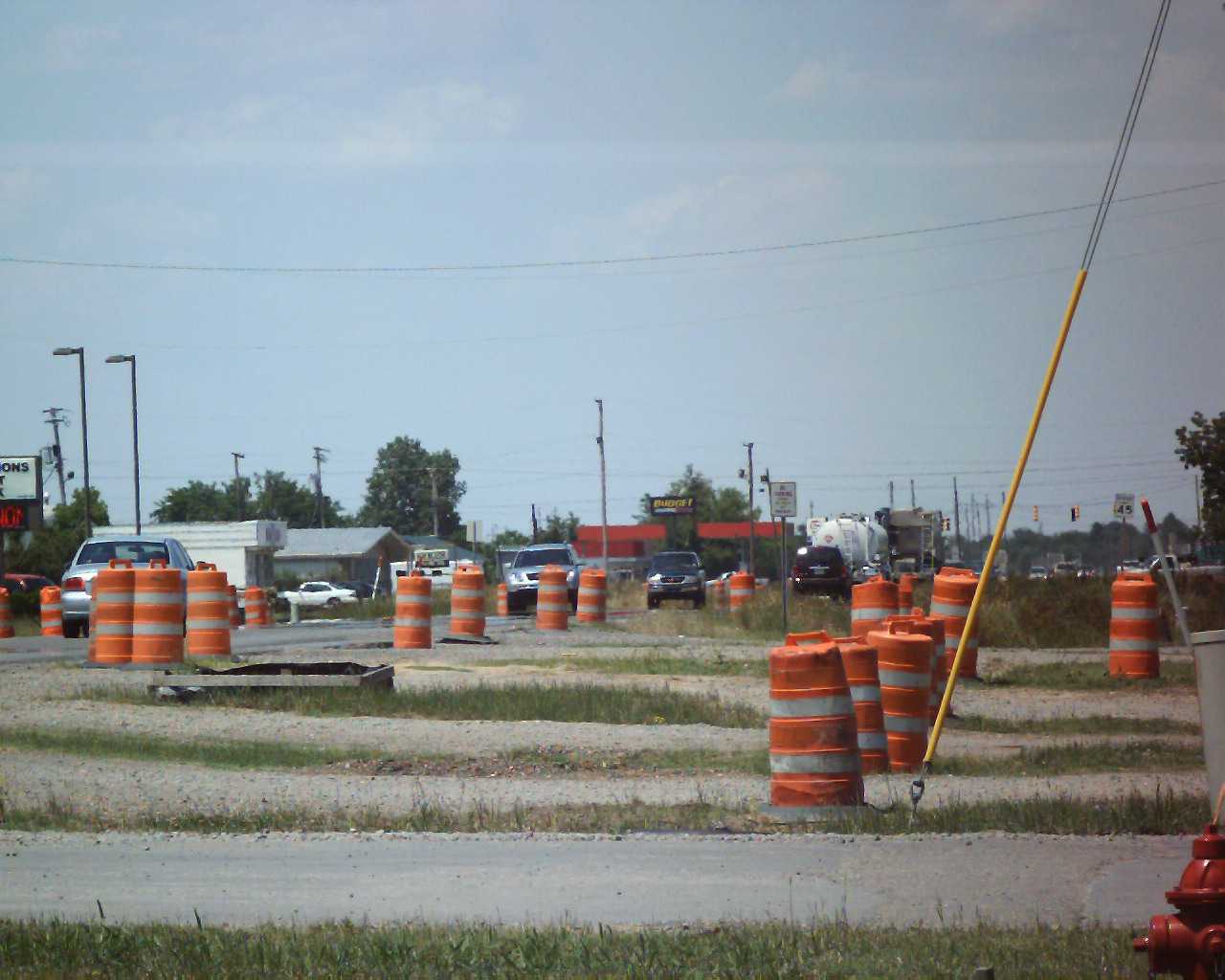
Road construction in June

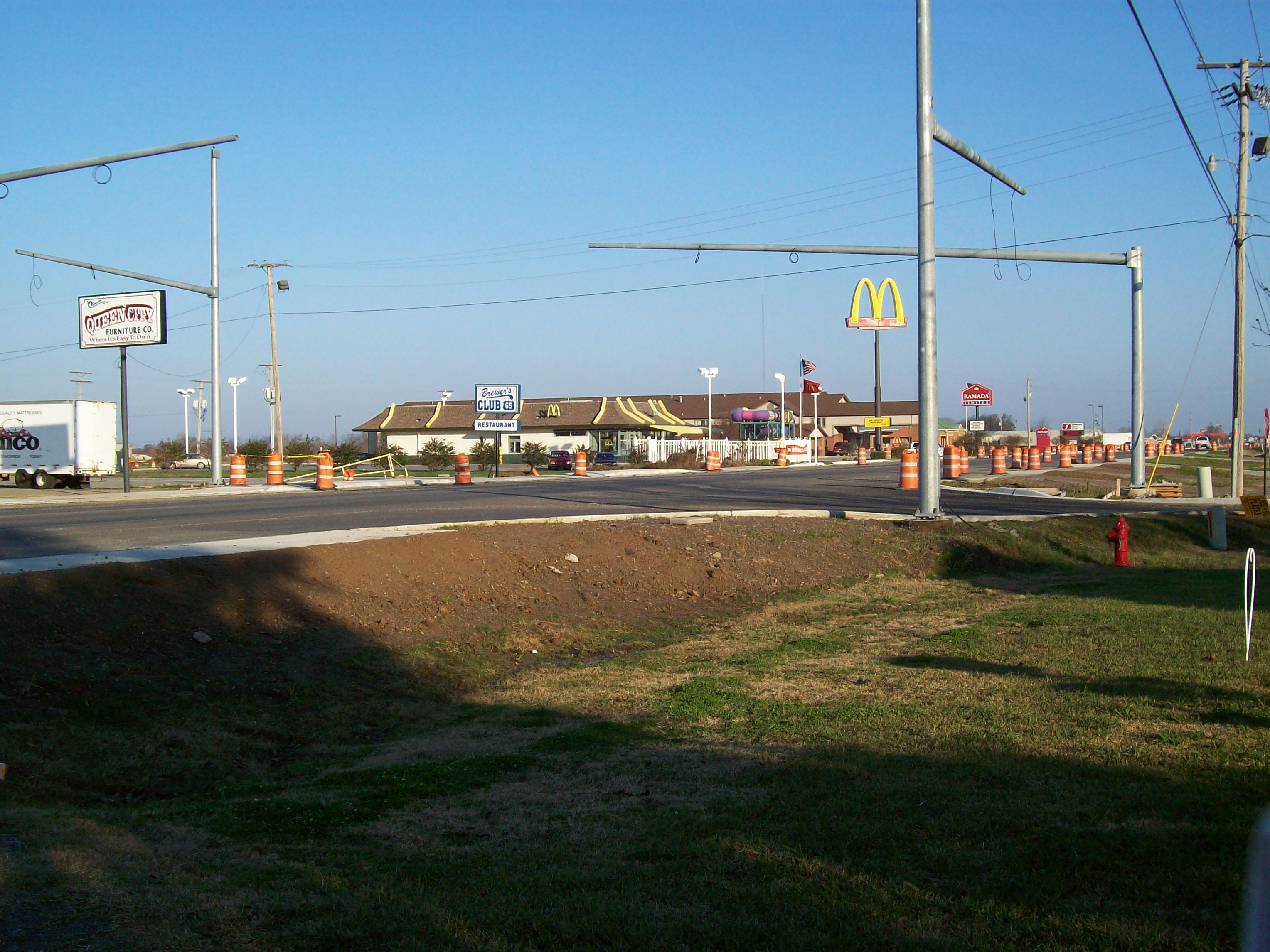
Stoplight in December

== Notable people ==
- Herm Bagby, American football player
- Lamar McHan, NFLe player and coach
- Daniel Reynolds, Confederate brigadier general
- Walter Garland Streett (1868–1932), member of the Arkansas House of Representatives
