= Eudora, Arkansas =

- City
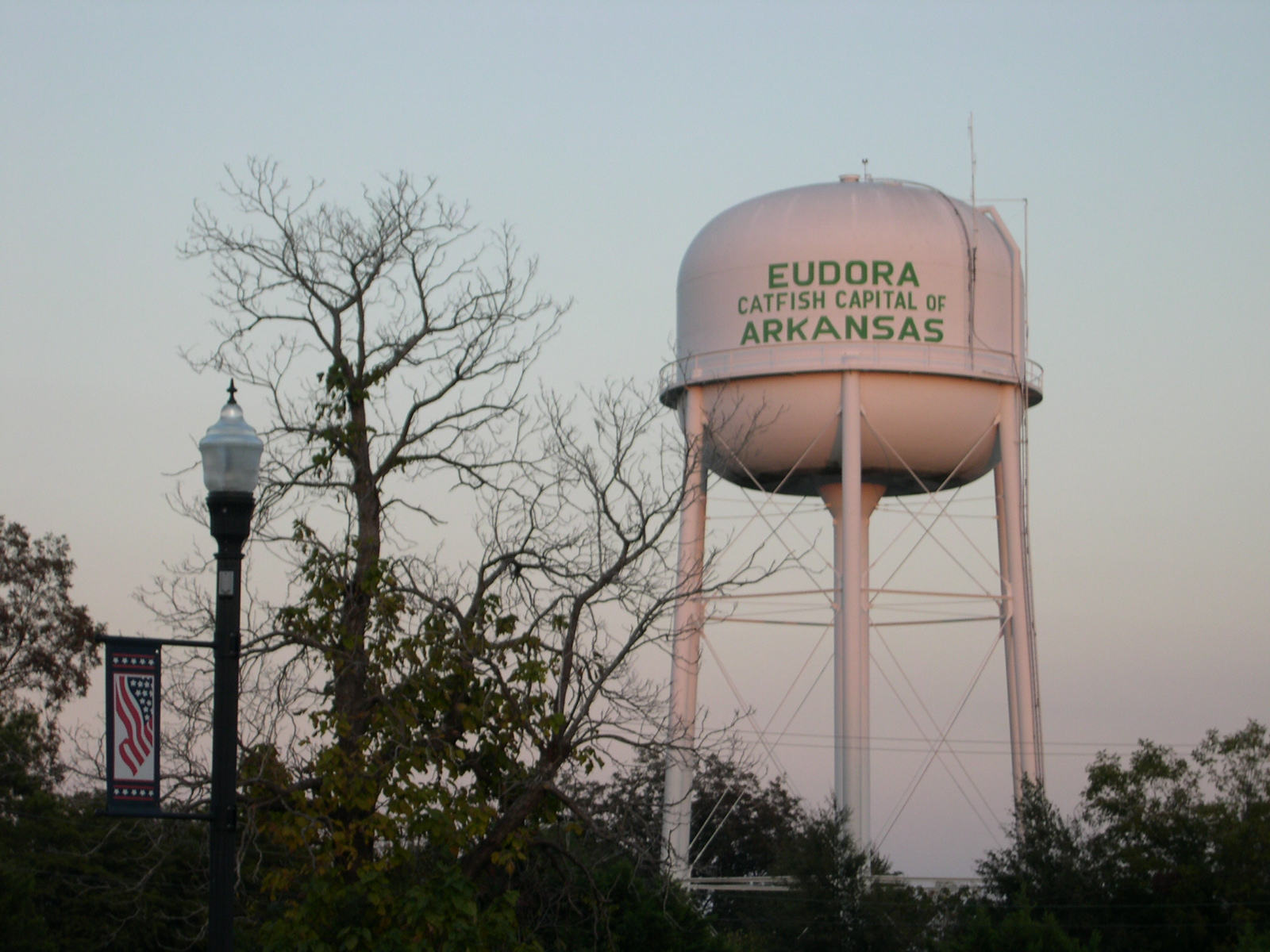
- Eudora - Catfish Capital of Arkansas

- Location of Eudora in Chicot County, Arkansas
- Coordinates: 33°07′30″N 91°15′44″W
- Country: United States
- State: Arkansas
- County: Chicot
- Incorporated: February 8, 1904

Area
  - Total: 3.09 sq mi (8.01 km^{2})
  - Land: 3.09 sq mi (8.01 km^{2})
  - Water: 0 sq mi (0.00 km^{2})
- Elevation: 135 ft (41 m)

Population (2020)
  - Total: 1,728
  - Estimate (2025): 1,511 ▼
  - Density: 558.7/sq mi (215.71/km^{2})
- Time zone: UTC-6 (Central (CST))
  - Summer (DST): UTC-5 (CDT)
- ZIP code: 71640
- Area code: 870
- FIPS code: 05-22180
- GNIS feature ID: 2403574
- Website: cityofeudora.municipalimpact.com

Eudora is a city in Chicot County, Arkansas, United States. The population was 1,728 at the 2020 census, down from 2,269 in 2010.

== History ==
According to the American Guide to Arkansas, Eudora is a "cotton-ginning and sawmill town with the usual red-brick stores and offices."

== Geography ==
Eudora is located in southern Chicot County. U.S. Route 65 passes through the city, leading north 17 miles (27 km) to Lake Village, the Chicot County seat, northeast (via U.S. Route 82) 29 miles (47 km) to Greenville, Mississippi, and south 24 miles (39 km) to Lake Providence, Louisiana. Grand Lake, a former channel of the Mississippi River, is 4 miles (6 km) to the southeast.

According to the United States Census Bureau, Eudora has a total area of 3.1 square miles (7.9 km^{2}), all land.

=== Climate ===
The climate in this area is characterized by hot, humid summers and mild winters. Eudora has a humid subtropical climate (Köppen 'Cfa', Trewartha 'Cf'). Temperature extremes since 1962 have ranged from 3 °F (-16 °C) in January 1982 and December 1989 to 108 °F (42 °C) in September 2000 and August 2011. More typically, a year will range from 17 °F (-8 °C) to 102 °F (39 °C).

Eudora is the warmest populated area in Arkansas.

Climate data for Eudora, Arkansas, 1991–2020 normals, extremes 1962–present
Month	Jan	Feb	Mar	Apr	May	Jun	Jul	Aug	Sep	Oct	Nov	Dec	Year
Record high °F (°C)	80 (27)	85 (29)	89 (32)	96 (36)	98 (37)	103 (39)	105 (41)	108 (42)	108 (42)	102 (39)	90 (32)	89 (32)	108 (42)
Mean maximum °F (°C)	74.5 (23.6)	78.2 (25.7)	83.4 (28.6)	88.1 (31.2)	92.8 (33.8)	97.2 (36.2)	99.9 (37.7)	101.0 (38.3)	98.8 (37.1)	92.2 (33.4)	83.1 (28.4)	76.5 (24.7)	102.0 (38.9)
Mean daily maximum °F (°C)	54.6 (12.6)	59.1 (15.1)	67.4 (19.7)	75.6 (24.2)	83.7 (28.7)	90.1 (32.3)	93.0 (33.9)	93.5 (34.2)	88.8 (31.6)	78.8 (26.0)	66.8 (19.3)	57.3 (14.1)	75.7 (24.3)
Daily mean °F (°C)	44.4 (6.9)	48.2 (9.0)	56.1 (13.4)	63.9 (17.7)	72.6 (22.6)	79.8 (26.6)	82.4 (28.0)	82.1 (27.8)	76.6 (24.8)	65.9 (18.8)	54.8 (12.7)	46.9 (8.3)	64.5 (18.1)
Mean daily minimum °F (°C)	34.3 (1.3)	37.3 (2.9)	44.8 (7.1)	52.3 (11.3)	61.5 (16.4)	69.5 (20.8)	71.8 (22.1)	70.7 (21.5)	64.5 (18.1)	53.0 (11.7)	42.7 (5.9)	36.4 (2.4)	53.2 (11.8)
Mean minimum °F (°C)	19.4 (−7.0)	23.7 (−4.6)	28.6 (−1.9)	36.9 (2.7)	48.1 (8.9)	59.5 (15.3)	64.7 (18.2)	61.9 (16.6)	50.9 (10.5)	37.1 (2.8)	27.3 (−2.6)	22.9 (−5.1)	17.3 (−8.2)
Record low °F (°C)	3 (−16)	10 (−12)	16 (−9)	27 (−3)	37 (3)	50 (10)	52 (11)	53 (12)	38 (3)	27 (−3)	16 (−9)	3 (−16)	3 (−16)
Average precipitation inches (mm)	6.09 (155)	5.78 (147)	5.46 (139)	6.63 (168)	4.75 (121)	4.17 (106)	4.07 (103)	4.17 (106)	4.12 (105)	4.65 (118)	4.72 (120)	5.85 (149)	60.46 (1,537)
Average snowfall inches (cm)	0.1 (0.25)	0.0 (0.0)	0.0 (0.0)	0.0 (0.0)	0.0 (0.0)	0.0 (0.0)	0.0 (0.0)	0.0 (0.0)	0.0 (0.0)	0.0 (0.0)	0.0 (0.0)	0.0 (0.0)	0.1 (0.25)
Average precipitation days (≥ 0.01 in)	10.3	9.6	9.8	8.2	8.6	7.9	7.7	7.0	6.0	6.6	7.8	9.7	99.2
Average snowy days (≥ 0.1 in)	0.1	0.2	0.0	0.0	0.0	0.0	0.0	0.0	0.0	0.0	0.0	0.0	0.3
Source 1: NOAA
Source 2: National Weather Service

== Demographics ==
Historical population
Census	Pop.	Note	%±
1910	606		—
1920	1,197		97.5%
1930	2,020		68.8%
1940	1,808		−10.5%
1950	3,072		69.9%
1960	3,598		17.1%
1970	3,687		2.5%
1980	3,840		4.1%
1990	3,155		−17.8%
2000	2,819		−10.6%
2010	2,269		−19.5%
2020	1,728		−23.8%
2025 (est.)	1,511	▼	−12.6%
U.S. Decennial Census; 2014 Estimate

=== 2020 census ===
As of the 2020 census, Eudora had a population of 1,728. The median age was 45.8 years. 24.0% of residents were under the age of 18 and 21.6% of residents were 65 years of age or older. For every 100 females there were 83.2 males, and for every 100 females age 18 and over there were 74.8 males age 18 and over.

0.0% of residents lived in urban areas, while 100.0% lived in rural areas.

There were 804 households in Eudora, of which 27.6% had children under the age of 18 living in them. Of all households, 19.7% were married-couple households, 24.0% were households with a male householder and no spouse or partner present, and 52.4% were households with a female householder and no spouse or partner present. About 42.5% of all households were made up of individuals and 20.2% had someone living alone who was 65 years of age or older.

There were 889 housing units, of which 9.6% were vacant. The homeowner vacancy rate was 0.4% and the rental vacancy rate was 4.2%.

Racial composition as of the 2020 census
Race	Number	Percent
White	101	5.8%
Black or African American	1,562	90.4%
American Indian and Alaska Native	2	0.1%
Asian	0	0.0%
Native Hawaiian and Other Pacific Islander	4	0.2%
Some other race	25	1.4%
Two or more races	34	2.0%
Hispanic or Latino (of any race)	27	1.6%

=== 2010 census ===
As of the 2010 United States census, there were 2,269 people living in the city. The racial makeup of the city was 89.3% Black, 9.1% White, 0.4% Native American, <0.1% Asian and 0.2% from two or more races. 1.0% were Hispanic or Latino of any race.

=== 2000 census ===
As of the census of 2000, there were 2,819 people, 1,047 households, and 731 families living in the city. The population density was 918.2 inhabitants per square mile (354.5/km^{2}). There were 1,163 housing units at an average density of 378.8 per square mile (146.3/km^{2}). The racial makeup of the city was 13.94% White, 84.50% Black or African American, 0.04% Native American, 0.18% Asian, 0.46% from other races, and 0.89% from two or more races. 1.38% of the population were Hispanic or Latino of any race.

There were 1,047 households, out of which 34.9% had children under the age of 18 living with them, 30.5% were married couples living together, 34.7% had a female householder with no husband present, and 30.1% were non-families. 26.6% of all households were made up of individuals, and 14.2% had someone living alone who was 65 years of age or older. The average household size was 2.69 and the average family size was 3.24.

In the city, the population was spread out, with 32.4% under the age of 18, 9.4% from 18 to 24, 23.7% from 25 to 44, 20.0% from 45 to 64, and 14.6% who were 65 years of age or older. The median age was 33 years. For every 100 females, there were 80.2 males. For every 100 females age 18 and over, there were 68.9 males. The median income for a household in the city was $17,857, and the median income for a family was $19,840. Males had a median income of $20,729 versus $15,262 for females. The per capita income for the city was $9,437. About 34.6% of families and 36.5% of the population were below the poverty line, including 43.3% of those under age 18 and 30.0% of those age 65 or over.

== Culture ==
In 1970 Tony Joe White released a song on his self-titled album entitled They Caught the Devil and Put Him in Jail in Eudora, Arkansas.

== Education ==
The Lakeside School District operates public schools. On February 13, 2006, the Eudora School District consolidated into the Lakeside district.

The Southeast Arkansas Public Library operates the Eudora Branch Library.

== Notable people ==
- Charley Barnes, NFL end, born in Eudora
- Frank Burgess, U.S. federal judge, born in Eudora
- Camille Keaton, actress
- Walter Garland Streett (1868–1932), member of the Arkansas House of Representatives

== See also ==
- List of cities and towns in Arkansas
