= 2011 Cordova–Blountsville tornado =

EF4 tornado that struck central Alabama in 2011

Coordinates: 33.2506°N 88.1814°W

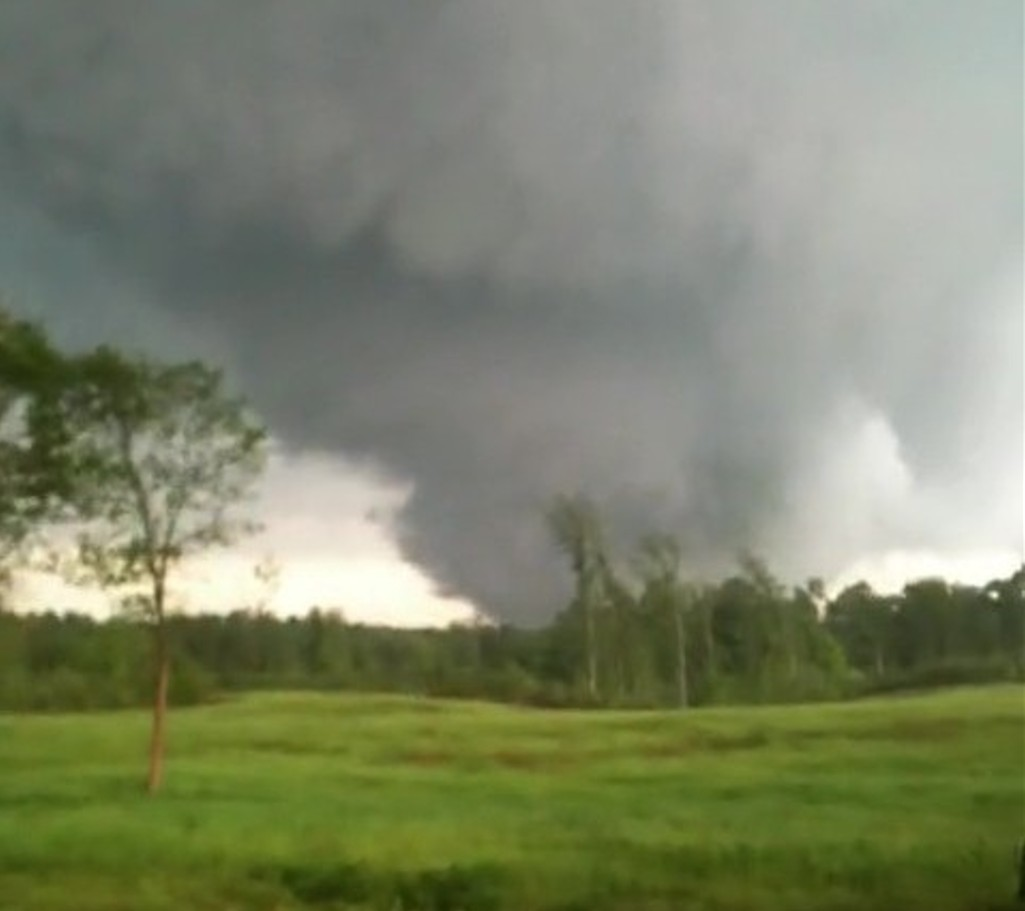
- The tornado at EF4 intensity near Sipsey, Alabama.

Meteorological history
- Formed: April 27, 2011, 3:40 p.m. CDT (UTC−05:00)
- Dissipated: April 27, 2011, 5:56 p.m. CDT (UTC−05:00)
- Duration: 2 hours, 16 minutes

EF4 tornado
- on the Enhanced Fujita scale
- Max width: 1,408 yards (1.287 km)
- Path length: 127.8 miles (205.7 km)
- Highest winds: 170 mph (270 km/h)

Overall effects
- Fatalities: 13
- Injuries: 54
- Damage: >$170.34 million (2011 USD)
- Areas affected: Cordova, Alabama, Tuscaloosa County, Alabama, Blount County, Alabama
- Part of the 2011 Super Outbreak and Tornadoes of 2011

In the afternoon hours of April 27, 2011, a large, long-tracked and violent EF4 tornado, known as the Cordova tornado, moved across Central Alabama, devastating several communities, including Cordova and Blountsville. The tornado killed 13 and had a maximum width of 1,408 yards (0.800 mi). It occurred as part of the largest tornado outbreak in modern history and was one of eleven EF4 tornadoes to strike the Southern United States on April 27. The tornado was the longest-tracked of the outbreak, carving a 127.8-mile (205.7 km) path of damage through seven counties.

The tornado first moved through northeast Pickens County, where it strengthened while impacting structures at EF0 and EF1 intensity, moving past several smaller towns. As the tornado moved into Cordova it reached EF3 intensity and heavily damaged the town. The tornado continued to strengthen as it moved across Alabama, reaching EF4 intensity as it passed northwest of Sumiton. The tornado retained this intensity as it caused sporadic damage across rural Alabama, destroying numerous homes and debarking trees. It dissipated south of Red Hill, after being on the ground for over two hours.

The tornado was the second tornado of at least EF3 intensity to hit Cordova on April 27, and the town was devastated by both. Four people were killed in the downtown Cordova, and several businesses and homes were obliterated by the tornado as it moved through the area.

== Meteorological synopsis ==
=== Setup ===
The environmental conditions leading up to the 2011 Super Outbreak were among the "most conducive to violent tornadoes ever documented". On April 25, a vigorous upper-level shortwave trough moved into the Southern Plains states. Ample instability, low-level moisture, and wind shear all fueled a significant tornado outbreak from Texas to Tennessee; at least 64 tornadoes touched down on this day. An area of low pressure consolidated over Texas on April 26 and traveled east while the aforementioned shortwave trough traversed the Mississippi and Ohio River valleys. Another 50 tornadoes touched down on this day. The multi-day outbreak culminated on April 27 with the most violent day of tornadic activity since the 1974 Super Outbreak. Multiple episodes of tornadic activity ensued with two waves of mesoscale convective systems in the morning hours followed by a widespread outbreak of supercells from Mississippi to North Carolina during the afternoon into the evening.

Tornadic activity on April 27 was precipitated by a 995 mbar (hPa; 29.39 inHg) surface low situated over Kentucky and a deep, negatively tilted (aligned northwest to southeast) trough over Arkansas and Louisiana. A strong southwesterly surface jet intersected these systems at a 60° angle, an ageostrophic flow that led to storm-relative helicity values in excess of 500 m^{2}s^{−2}—indicative of extreme wind shear and a very high potential for rotating updrafts within supercells. Ample moisture from the Gulf of Mexico was brought north across the Deep South, leading to daytime high temperatures of 77 to 81 °F (25 to 27 °C) and dewpoints of 66 to 72 °F (19 to 22 °C). Furthermore, convective available potential energy (CAPE) values reached 2,500–3,000 J/kg^{−1}.

=== Forecast ===
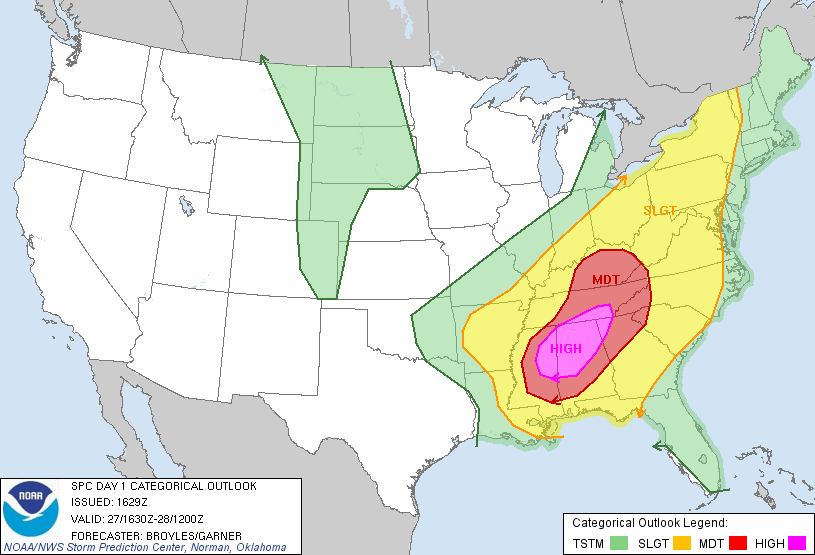
The National Weather Service Storm Prediction Center's Day 1 Convective Outlook for April 27, showing the Categorical Graphic

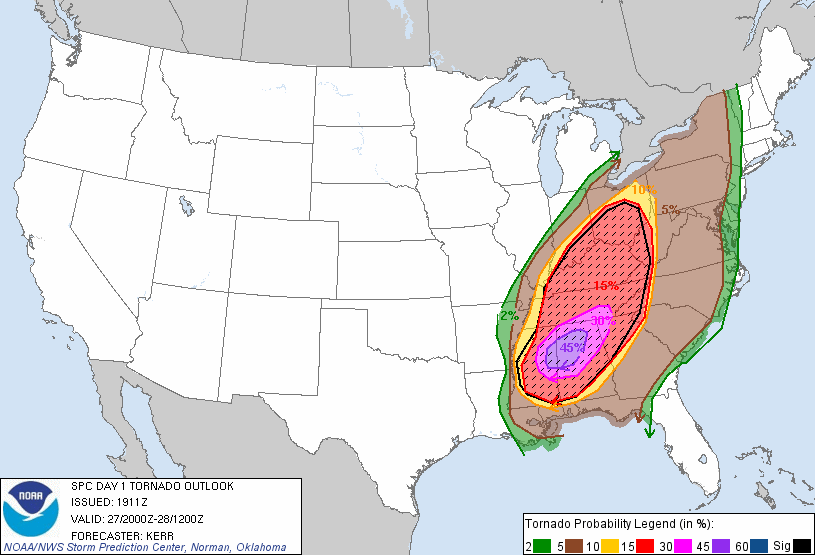
The probability of a tornado within 25 miles of a point (cross-hatched area: 10% or greater probability of EF2+ tornadoes)

On the morning of April 27, a strong cold front with several areas of embedded low pressure extended from the Texas Hill Country northeastward towards the Arklatex and the Ozarks, and later into the lower Ohio Valley. Warm moist air was in place due to strong southerly flow ahead of the front over Mississippi, Alabama, and Tennessee. An upper level disturbance sparked a broad area of showers and thunderstorms as it moved across the frontal boundary on the previous evening. The eastern edge of the line of showers and storms continued to move eastward, in concert with the upper disturbance, reaching the northwest Alabama border around 2:00 a.m. CDT.

This produced the last and most violent round of severe weather, which began around 2:30 p.m. CDT for northern Alabama as supercells began to line up to the southwest of the area. During the early afternoon hours, the potential for destructive tornadoes was highlighted by the Storm Prediction Center's upgrade to a high risk for severe weather around 1:00 p.m. CDT. This prompted a particularly dangerous situation (PDS) tornado watch, which was issued for northern Alabama and portions of southern Tennessee at 1:45 p.m. CDT. The bulletin that accompanied the watch read:

THE NWS STORM PREDICTION CENTER HAS ISSUED A TORNADO WATCH FOR PORTIONS OF: MUCH OF ALABAMA, NORTHWEST GEORGIA, SOUTHEAST MISSISSIPPI, SOUTHERN MIDDLE TENNESSEE, EFFECTIVE THIS WEDNESDAY AFTERNOON AND EVENING FROM 145 PM UNTIL 1000 PM CDT.

...THIS IS A PARTICULARLY DANGEROUS SITUATION...

DESTRUCTIVE TORNADOES...LARGE HAIL TO 4 INCHES IN DIAMETER. THUNDERSTORM WIND GUSTS TO 80 MPH...AND DANGEROUS LIGHTNING ARE POSSIBLE IN THESE AREAS.

The potential for tornadoes ramped up from noon through 9:00 p.m. CDT. During this period, much of Alabama experienced numerous supercell thunderstorms that produced violent tornadoes, including five EF4s tornadoes, one being the Central Alabama tornado.

=== Cordova EF3 tornado ===
Prior to the Central Alabama tornado, a large EF3 tornado crossed areas that would be hit hours later, including Cordova. The tornado touched down near Fairview, where it would reach EF3 intensity as it destroyed a home to the south of Cedar Lake. The tornado continued to move in a northward direction, inflicting EF1 damage to trees as it moved to the east of Pleasant Field. After passing to the west of Drifton, the tornado moved northward, tracking directly into downtown Cordova. The tornado damaged numerous brick buildings in the area and uprooted several trees before lifting a short distance north of the town.

== Tornado summary ==
- Damage survey track of this tornado (centermost red line), as well as the tracks of other EF3+ tornadoes that occurred during 2011 Super Outbreak. (Interactive map, click or tap to view in detail); View mapdata Key EF0 65–85 mph (105–137 km/h); EF1 86–110 mph (138–177 km/h); EF2 111–135 mph (179–217 km/h); EF3 136–165 mph (219–266 km/h); EF4 166–200 mph (267–322 km/h); EF5 ≥201 mph (323 km/h)

=== Formation and track into Reform ===
The tornado touched down at 3:40 p.m. CDT (20:40 UTC) in northeastern Pickens County, Alabama, damaging a few chicken homes at EF1 strength and uprooting several hardwood trees at the same strength. The tornado retained this intensity and widened as it crossed Pine Grove Road near Carloss. The tornado ran parallel to the track of another EF2 tornado that hit areas a short distance north of the tornado. It crossed County Road 12, west of Owens, and moved through areas northwest of Stansel. As the tornado neared Reform, it turned to the east, directly impacting Lathrop.

After the tornado impacted Lathrop, it moved through forested areas, uprooting trees at EF0 and EF1 intensity. Damage in the area was sporadic as the tornado neared Lubbub. At least two homes north of the town were damaged at EF0 intensity as the tornado crossed County Road 49, along with several swaths of trees. The tornado continued along a straight path, crossing into Tuscaloosa County before turning to the east. It crossed SR 171 at EF3 intensity, debarking several hardwood trees and inflicting minor damage to a home. At least four people were killed in the area; two fatalities occurred within a home that was destroyed at EF3 intensity.

The tornado caused roof damage to houses and destroyed a few outbuildings before moving into Tuscaloosa County and briefly into Fayette County, causing major EF2 tree damage and minor structural damage. The tornado then moved back into Tuscaloosa County, causing mostly minor tree and structural damage at EF1 strength before rapidly intensifying and crossing into Fayette County once again. There, it completely destroyed at least one mobile home, with the frame being separated and the remaining debris being tossed by the tornado. The tornado appeared to strengthen even further and several mobile homes were obliterated with debris being lofted and frames twisted and thrown. Damage was rated EF3 in this area. Many trees were downed as well before the tornado moved into Walker County.

The tornado then weakened to EF1 strength and caused mostly minor damage to trees and mobile homes. South of Oakman, numerous trees were snapped and uprooted, a cell phone tower was knocked down, and mobile homes were destroyed at EF2 intensity. It then rolled vehicles and destroyed a cinder block house to the southeast of Oakman, with damage rated EF3 at that location. The tornado weakened considerably as it approached Corridor X/US 78/SR 4, with only minor EF0 tree damage, before it strengthened significantly as it entered the town of Cordova as a 0.5-mile (0.80 km) wide EF3 tornado.

=== Damage in Cordova and Sipsey ===
In Cordova, numerous homes and manufactured houses were either damaged or destroyed in this area; many trees were also downed. Some unanchored homes in town were swept from their foundations. Buildings in downtown Cordova had already been damaged by an EF3 tornado earlier that morning and received further damage from this tornado.

EF3 damage was documented in downtown Cordova, likely from the Central Alabama tornado. At least three homes were destroyed at this intensity, and four people were killed when their home was hit by the tornado. In the same area, the tornado stripped vegetation out of the ground, producing a highly visible damage path. The tornado also destroyed the town's city hall, the Piggly Wiggly grocery store and at least one Methodist church.

East of Cordova, the tornado crossed the Mulberry Fork of the Black Warrior River three times (along with the Sipsey Fork once, just north of its confluence with the Mulberry Fork). It intensified further into a violent EF4 tornado in northeastern Walker County, as it completely leveled a site-built home and obliterated two nearby mobile homes.

One of the mobile home undercarriages was tossed at least 500 yards (460 m). A 5-ton bulldozer was flipped over, a pickup truck was tossed 200 yards (180 m), and a dump truck was tossed 50 yards (46 m) and destroyed. A two-ton trailer was thrown 1 mile (1.6 km) and left a 2.5-foot (0.76 m) deep crater where it impacted the ground. Two double-wide mobile homes were tossed at least 100 yards (91 m), and a third mobile home was tossed 100 yards (91 m) up a 50 foot (15 m) embankment and destroyed along this segment of the path as well. South of Sipsey, additional homes and mobile homes were destroyed at EF2 to EF3 strength and numerous trees were snapped.

=== Cullman and Blount counties ===
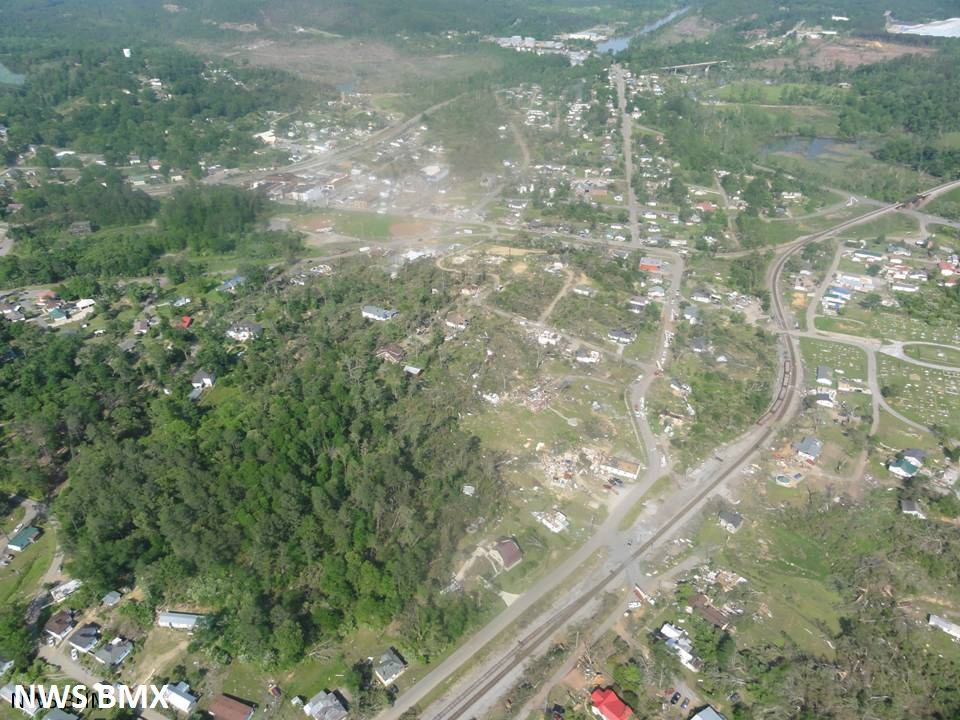
Aerial view of high-end EF3 damage in Cordova.

The tornado then crossed the Mulberry Fork for the fourth time and moved into Cullman County The tornado then crossed the Mulberry Fork again, moving into Blount County, where it caused EF1 roof damage to a home and snapped hundreds of trees. It then crossed I-65 before crossing the Mulberry Fork into Cullman County southwest of Garden City, snapping numerous additional trees at EF1 strength. It quickly crossed the river again (the seventh crossing), moving back into Blount County.

The tornado continued to the south-southwest of Garden City, straddling the Mulberry Fork before finally moving solidly into Blount County and toward Blountsville. On the southeast side of Blountsville, the tornado downed many trees and caused high-end EF2 damage to well-built brick and slab foundation homes, one of which had some exterior walls collapse. The storm continued to the northeast and out of Blountsville, where two additional homes sustained high-end EF3 damage.

The tornado then moved into Marshall County, causing significant damage to a house and downing numerous trees. A shed suffered roof damage and an industrial plant was completely destroyed at EF2 strength as well. The tornado then moved into a wooded area, weakened, and eventually lifted south-southwest of Guntersville at 5:56 p.m. CDT (22:56 UTC). Thousands of trees were downed along the tornado's path. The tornado was on the ground for two hours and sixteen minutes, tracking for 127.8 miles (205.7 km) across seven counties. It was rated as a low-end EF4 with winds of 170 mph (270 km/h).

== Aftermath ==
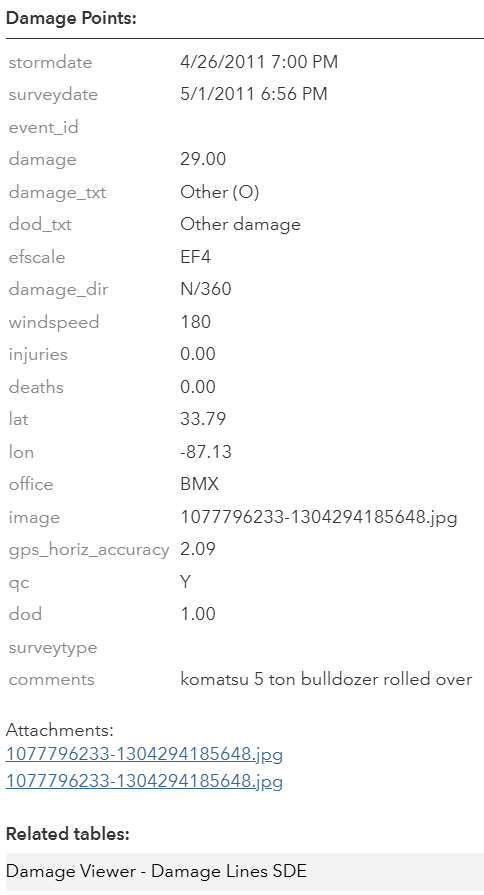
The tornado's highest windspeed seen on the Damage Assessment Toolkit.

Cordova was devastated by the tornado, which was the second major tornado to hit the community on April 27. Several businesses and other buildings were destroyed or heavily damaged in and outside of the town, and four were killed in the downtown area. The city of Cordova was awarded $5,098,515 equivalent to $7,297,000 in 2025 to aid with recovery efforts after the tornado; Blount County was awarded $758,572 (equivalent to $1,086,000 in 2025). Recovery efforts continued for months after the tornadoes. In the weeks and months after the tornado, numerous fires started in downtown Cordova within the rubble, which further damaged structures and temporarily stunted recovery efforts.

=== FEMA trailer controversy ===
In May 2011, the mayor of Cordova issued a city-wide ordinance that prohibited the use of FEMA aid trailers within city limits. The ordinance was highly controversial and was met with nationwide backlash. FEMA was also criticized for not carrying out rebuilding work in downtown Cordova after the tornado; the downtown area was sealed off using a chain-link fence to prevent trespassers.

== Memorials ==
In December 2021, following a large tornado outbreak in the Mississippi Valley, former Cordova mayor Drew Gilbert stated that “We need to get emergency services back online. It's literally putting the essentials of life back online. It took four or five years to get back in a city like Cordova”.

On April 27 of each year, the city of Cordova flies a flag as a memorial to the tornadoes that hit. In April 2025, some residents of Cordova convened to memorialize the four people who died in the town.

== See also ==
- List of F4 and EF4 tornadoes (2010–2019)

== Notes and references ==
=== Sources ===
- "April 27th 2011 Severe Weather Setup". National Weather Service.
- "Cordova Tornado - April 27, 2011". National Weather Service.
