= Tornado outbreak of January 10–11, 2020 =

American severe weather outbreak

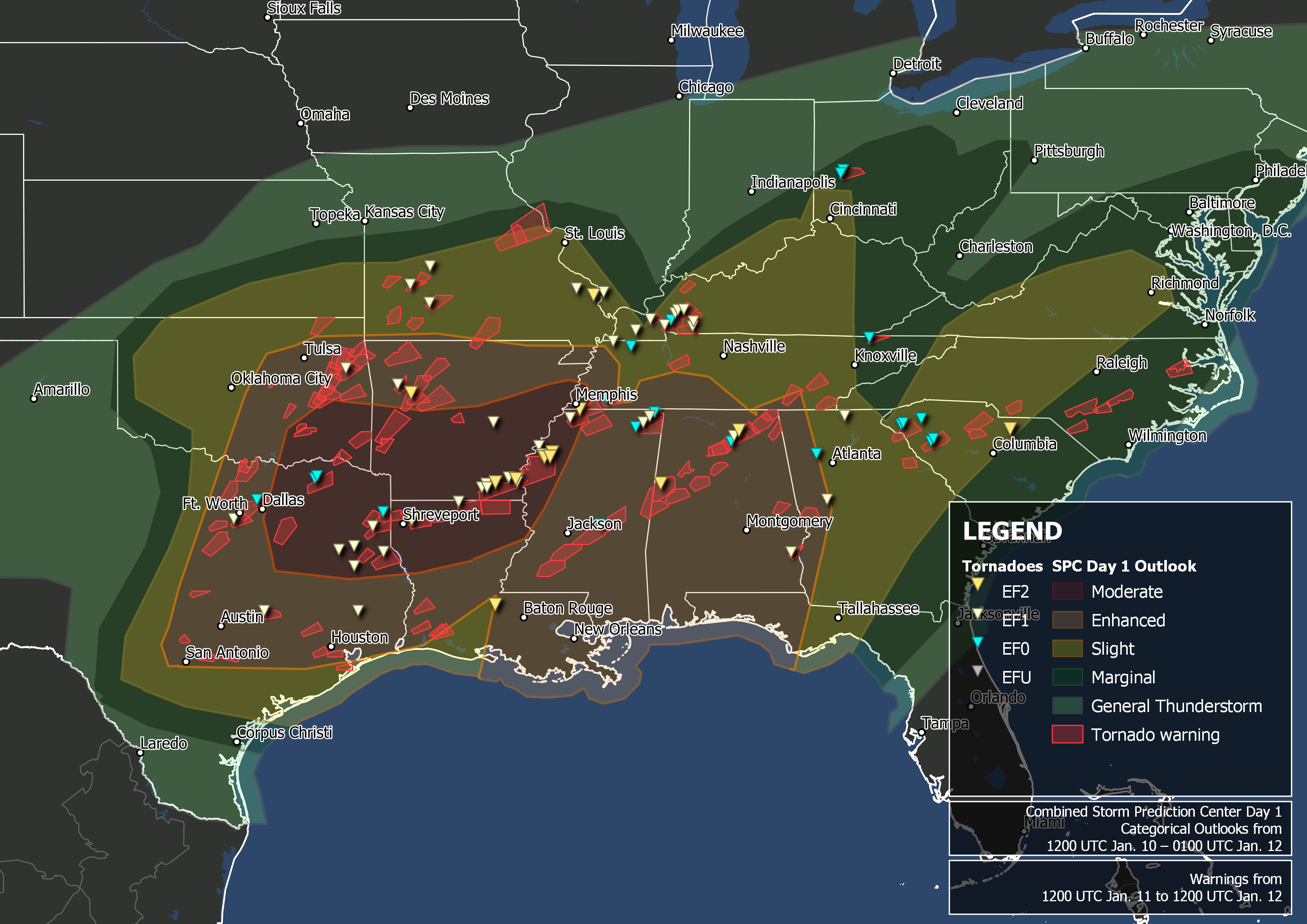
- Confirmed tornadoes and thunderstorm wind events received by the Storm Prediction Center

Meteorological history
- Date: January 10–11, 2020
- Duration: 1 day, 7 hours, 43 minutes

Tornado outbreak
- Tornadoes: 80
- Max. rating: EF2 tornado
- Highest winds: Tornadic – 135 mph (217 km/h) (Bossier Parish, LA EF2 tornado on January 10); Non-tornadic – 95 mph (153 km/h) (near Monticello, Arkansas on January 11)
- Largest hail: 1.75 in (4.4 cm) (multiple locations)

Overall effects
- Fatalities: 7 (+5 non-tornadic)
- Injuries: 19
- Damage: $1.1 billion (2020 USD)
- Areas affected: South Central United States, Southeastern United States
- Power outages: 318,000
- Part of the tornado outbreaks of 2020

The tornado outbreak of January 10–11, 2020 was a two-day severe weather event stretching from the South-Central Plains eastward into the Southeast United States. An eastward-moving shortwave trough tracked across the continental United States through that two-day period, combining with abundant moisture, instability, and wind shear to promote the formation of a long-lived squall line. Hundreds of damaging wind reports were received, and 80 tornadoes occurred within this line, making it the third largest January tornado outbreak on record. Three tornadoes—an EF1 in eastern Texas, an EF2 in northern Louisiana, and an EF2 in western Alabama—led to a total of seven deaths, all in mobile homes. There were five other storm related deaths, including two due to icy roads in Lubbock, Texas, one due to drowning in Oklahoma, and one due to icy roads in Iowa. The system also brought a monthly record high temperature to Boston and Bridgeport. Extensive damage and several other injuries occurred as well. The severe weather event was notable in that it was forecast well in advance, with the Storm Prediction Center first highlighting the risk area a full week beforehand. Total damage from the event reached $1.1 billion according to the National Centers for Environmental Information.

== Meteorological synopsis ==
Beginning on January 5, the Storm Prediction Center (SPC) highlighted the potential for organized severe weather across central Texas eastward into far western Georgia valid for January 10–11. The day 7 outlook issued that day constituted only the fourth time a severe weather risk had been delineated a week in advance in January, alongside January 23, 2013, January 18, 2010, and January 1, 2008. Despite the unusually high confidence at a long lead time, the threat region aligned well with climatologically favored areas for severe weather during the month. On January 6, the day 6 outlook for January 10 raised portions of northeastern Texas, northwestern Louisiana, southeastern Oklahoma, and southern Arkansas to a 30% probability of severe weather, equivalent to an Enhanced risk. Much of Alabama and Mississippi, in addition to a small section of both Louisiana and Florida, were upgraded to an Enhanced risk in the following day's outlook as well. On January 9, after days of refining the risk area, the SPC elevated northeastern Texas, northern Louisiana, and far southern Arkansas to a Moderate risk. Although the Moderate risk was initially issued given high confidence in a widespread damaging wind event, including the potential for a derecho, the morning outlook on January 10 raised the potential for strong, long-tracked tornadoes across eastern Texas, northern Louisiana, southern Arkansas, and extreme western Mississippi.

At the start of the day, a cold front was analyzed from south-central Kansas southwestward into an area of low pressure across the Texas Panhandle. In advance of this front, persistent warm-air advection led to quickly-rising dewpoints across western Oklahoma and far south-central Kansas. Aloft, a deep shortwave trough across the Southwestern United States pushed eastward, resulting in cold mid-level temperatures and the development of a modestly unstable environment. In the presence of strong wind shear, and given the impetus for convective development, thunderstorms mainly capable of a severe hail threat began to form throughout the morning hours. Intensifying thunderstorms farther east across central and eastern Oklahoma led to the day's first tornado watch at 16:40 UTC. Numerous other tornado and severe thunderstorm watches were issued as the day progressed. As the cold front shifted eastward, a line of thunderstorms developed along this boundary from southern Missouri down into central Texas. Despite the expectation that supercells capable of strong tornadoes would precede this line, convection instead failed to organize in an unstable but slightly capped environment. The SPC ultimately decided to downgrade tornado probabilities and remove the hatched area denoting the potential for strong tornadoes in their 01:00 UTC outlook.

Throughout the overnight hours, the southern edge of the convective line surged eastward at an increasing rate, leading to interaction with pre-frontal thunderstorms that increased rotation in an already volatile environment. Numerous embedded rotations and semi-discrete supercell structures formed within the line, producing many tornadoes. An EF1 tornado west-southwest of Nacogdoches, Texas, led to the death of one person, while a long-tracked EF2 tornado that tracked from southeast of Bossier City to north of Arcadia, Louisiana, led to three more fatalities. All four deaths from these two tornadoes were in mobile homes. By the afternoon hours of January 11, the already intense line of convection consolidated further as instability increased and an upper-level trough approached from the west. A high-end EF2 tornado caused severe damage near Carrollton, Alabama, causing three deaths between two manufactured homes that were demolished. Numerous other tornadoes and hundreds of damaging wind reports were recorded throughout the afternoon, but the squall line began to weaken late on January 11 as the forcing mechanism lifted northeast into the Ohio River Valley and as daytime heating waned.

== Confirmed tornadoes ==
Confirmed tornadoes by Enhanced Fujita rating
| EFU | EF0 | EF1 | EF2 | EF3 | EF4 | EF5 | Total |
|---|---|---|---|---|---|---|---|
| 1 | 26 | 40 | 13 | 0 | 0 | 0 | 80 |

=== January 10 event ===
List of confirmed tornadoes – Friday, January 10, 2020 (Note: All dates are based on the local time zone where the tornado touched down; however, all times are in Coordinated Universal Time for consistency.)
| EF# | Location | County / Parish | State | Start Coord. | Time (UTC) | Path length | Max width |
|---|---|---|---|---|---|---|---|
| EF0 | Prague | Lincoln | OK | 35.4864°N 96.6952°W | 16:34–16:37 | 1.3 mi (2.1 km) | 10 yd (9.1 m) |
| EF0 | A weak tornado damaged a few homes and destroyed a few sheds or outbuildings in Prague. | | | | | | |
| EFU | SE of Murphy | Mayes | OK | 36.0991°N 95.1771°W | 17:55–17:56 | 1 mi (1.6 km) | 50 yd (46 m) |
| EFU | Multiple storm chasers observed a tornado, but the area where it occurred was inaccessible by road, so no damage is known to have occurred. | | | | | | |
| EF1 | WNW of Fair Play | Cedar, Polk | MO | 37.6057°N 93.6194°W | 20:27–20:41 | 8.7 mi (14.0 km) | 50 yd (46 m) |
| EF1 | A manufactured home and several outbuildings were destroyed by this high-end EF1 tornado. Several homes sustained damage, and several trees were snapped or uprooted. | | | | | | |
| EF0 | WNW of Boyd | Wise | TX | 33.0971°N 97.6375°W | 20:46–20:47 | 0.4 mi (0.64 km) | 75 yd (69 m) |
| EF0 | A barn was destroyed, with debris scattered 0.25 mi (0.40 km) downstream. A nearby gas station was damaged, along with some tree limbs. | | | | | | |
| EF1 | WNW of Keys | Cherokee | OK | 35.7796°N 95.0229°W | 20:49–20:57 | 5.8 mi (9.3 km) | 250 yd (230 m) |
| EF1 | The roofs of a house and two mobile homes were damaged. A number of trees were uprooted, and some outbuildings were damaged as well. | | | | | | |
| EF1 | E of Cross Timbers | Hickory | MO | 38.0057°N 93.1863°W | 21:20–21:23 | 1.57 mi (2.53 km) | 100 yd (91 m) |
| EF1 | An outbuilding was destroyed, numerous trees were snapped or uprooted, and two homes sustained minor roof damage. | | | | | | |
| EF1 | NE of Godley | Johnson | TX | 32.4886°N 97.4673°W | 23:41–23:47 | 1.05 mi (1.69 km) | 250 yd (230 m) |
| EF1 | The roofs and awnings of several homes and buildings were damaged. A barn was flipped and blown into the side of a house. A large horse trailer was moved, an 18-wheeler trailer was overturned, and a small storage shed was damaged. Four power poles were leaned over as well. | | | | | | |
| EF1 | E of Springfield to Strafford | Greene | MO | 37.2091°N 93.2016°W | 23:42–23:53 | 6.98 mi (11.23 km) | 75 yd (69 m) |
| EF1 | An automobile service building lost overhead doors and sustained roof damage. Several homes suffered significant roof damage and damage to gutters and garage doors. Two box trucks were overturned, and numerous trees were snapped and uprooted. A large metal building sustained damage to its overhead doors. | | | | | | |
| EF0 | Cooper | Delta | TX | 33.3727°N 95.7016°W | 00:15–00:17 | 0.45 mi (0.72 km) | 150 yd (140 m) |
| EF0 | A brief tornado destroyed a small outbuilding and tore the roof and part of a cinder block wall from a small commercial building. A large sheet metal building was seriously damaged and an apartment complex in town suffered siding damage. Other structures and some trees suffered minor damage. | | | | | | |
| EF0 | SE of Enloe | Delta | TX | 33.4254°N 95.6532°W | 00:22–00:23 | 0.14 mi (0.23 km) | 100 yd (91 m) |
| EF0 | Another brief tornado was spawned by the same supercell as the Cooper tornado. A couple of small outbuildings were destroyed with debris scattered a few hundred yards downwind in a subtle cyclonic pattern. | | | | | | |
| EF0 | Northern Irving | Dallas | TX | 32.9067°N 96.9645°W | 00:42–00:44 | 1.11 mi (1.79 km) | 175 yd (160 m) |
| EF0 | A grocery store and other structures sustained roof damage. The exterior wall of a hotel, the roofs and windows of two restaurants, trees, light poles, and commercial signs were damaged. | | | | | | |
| EF2 | NE of Cove Lake to ENE of Tokalon | Logan | AR | 35.2151°N 93.5999°W | 01:44–02:02 | 13.6 mi (21.9 km) | 250 yd (230 m) |
| EF2 | One mobile home and a barn were destroyed, and another mobile home was damaged. Homes lost large sections of their roofs but most of their walls remained. Other outbuildings and chicken houses were damaged or destroyed. Trees and power lines were knocked down along the path. | | | | | | |
| EF1 | E of Cecil | Franklin | AR | 35.4262°N 93.8928°W | 01:45–01:49 | 3.9 mi (6.3 km) | 400 yd (370 m) |
| EF1 | Several outbuildings were destroyed, the roof of a home was damaged, numerous trees were snapped or uprooted, and power poles were toppled. | | | | | | |
| EF1 | WSW of Caldwell | Burleson | TX | 30.4847°N 96.8042°W | 03:34–03:35 | 0.11 mi (0.18 km) | 100 yd (91 m) |
| EF1 | A shed was destroyed and a trailer was thrown 40 yards (37 m) to the south while debris was blown to the northeast. Numerous trees were snapped. | | | | | | |
| EF1 | NW of Rusk | Cherokee | TX | 31.8177°N 95.1751°W | 05:21–05:22 | 0.8 mi (1.3 km) | 75 yd (69 m) |
| EF1 | A shed was destroyed and the roofs of five homes were damaged. Trees were uprooted. | | | | | | |
| EF1 | WSW of Nacogdoches | Nacogdoches | TX | 31.5832°N 94.7558°W | 05:33–05:36 | 2.13 mi (3.43 km) | 160 yd (150 m) |
| EF1 | 1 death – Trees were knocked down and large tree branches were broken. One tree fell into a mobile home, killing one person and injuring another. Several other homes suffered minor damage. | | | | | | |
| EF1 | N of Cushing | Rusk | TX | 31.8968°N 94.8427°W | 05:43–05:50 | 4.24 mi (6.82 km) | 500 yd (460 m) |
| EF1 | Several farm outbuildings were tossed and demolished, and two houses sustained roof damage. Numerous trees were snapped and uprooted. | | | | | | |
| EF1 | NE of Pollok | Angelina | TX | 31.4619°N 94.8401°W | 05:53–05:54 | 0.31 mi (0.50 km) | 150 yd (140 m) |
| EF1 | A double wide mobile home was lifted up and shifted off its foundation, and a trailer was flipped. Trees and tree limbs were snapped in a convergent pattern. | | | | | | |

=== January 11 event ===
List of confirmed tornadoes – Saturday, January 11, 2020
| EF# | Location | County / Parish | State | Start Coord. | Time (UTC) | Path length | Max width |
|---|---|---|---|---|---|---|---|
| EF1 | ENE of Tatum | Panola | TX | 32.3289°N 94.4356°W | 06:18–06:19 | 0.52 mi (0.84 km) | 150 yd (140 m) |
| EF1 | This high-end EF1 tornado snapped or uprooted a few hundred pine trees on a hillside. It then caused sporadic tree damage before crossing FM 959, causing mainly roof damage to several residences and outbuildings before dissipating. | | | | | | |
| EF0 | S of Karnack | Harrison | TX | 32.6402°N 94.2112°W | 06:30–06:33 | 3 mi (4.8 km) | 100 yd (91 m) |
| EF0 | This high-end EF0 tornado snapped small and large tree branches. The tornado also tore the wooden front porch and gutters off of a home as it crossed SH 43. It then crossed County Road 2600 before lifting near FM 134 before entering the Longhorn Army Ammunition Plant. | | | | | | |
| EF1 | Center | Shelby | TX | 31.773°N 94.2021°W | 06:39–06:49 | 6.07 mi (9.77 km) | 400 yd (370 m) |
| EF1 | Numerous trees were snapped or uprooted in town, many of which inflicted damage to homes upon falling. One fallen pine tree resulted in a minor injury when it significantly damaged the roof of a home. East of town, a number of chicken houses had some roof paneling removed, including a few where most paneling was ripped off. | | | | | | |
| EF1 | NE of Patton | Bollinger | MO | 37.52°N 89.99°W | 06:52–06:53 | 0.2 mi (0.32 km) | 45 yd (41 m) |
| EF1 | A brief tornado touched down along Route 72, destroying the workshop area of a house and ripping the roof off of a nearby barn. Debris was thrown as much as 100 yards (91 m) away. A few trees were also uprooted. | | | | | | |
| EF1 | E of Seaton | Lonoke | AR | 34.6013°N 91.8024°W | 06:58–06:59 | 0.43 mi (0.69 km) | 130 yd (120 m) |
| EF1 | The roof of a house was damaged, a storage shed was lifted about 100 feet (30 m) into the air, thrown into trees, and completely destroyed, part of a grain bin was blown in, and part of a barn roof was peeled back by this damaging tornado. Several power poles were snapped as well. | | | | | | |
| EF2 | Sligo to Sibley to SE of Athens | Bossier, Webster, Claiborne | LA | 32.4571°N 93.5875°W | 07:24–08:05 | 42.06 mi (67.69 km) | 300 yd (270 m) |
| EF2 | 3 deaths – See section on this tornado. | | | | | | |
| EF2 | ESE of Jackson to Egypt Mills | Cape Girardeau | MO | 37.35°N 89.6118°W | 07:42–07:55 | 9.7 mi (15.6 km) | 300 yd (270 m) |
| EF2 | This strong tornado touched down and quickly reached its peak intensity as it crossed US 61/BL I-55/Route 34. One business was destroyed, and several others suffered broken windows or roof damage. A tire store had its roof destroyed with debris thrown hundreds of yards, and its back exterior wall was blown out. Debris was tossed onto nearby I-55, which had to be closed for a short time so that it could be cleaned up. East of the Interstate, several barns or outbuildings were damaged or destroyed, and numerous trees were snapped and uprooted in the Egypt Mills area. The path may have extended past Route 177 to Bainbridge and the Mississippi River, but flooding prevented additional surveys. | | | | | | |
| EF1 | Ware | Union | IL | 37.446°N 89.4021°W | 08:02–08:03 | 0.86 mi (1.38 km) | 50 yd (46 m) |
| EF1 | This tornado, which came from the same storm that produced the Jackson, Missouri EF2 tornado, touched down and crossed IL 3/IL 146 as it moved directly through Ware. Considerable damage occurred as a large open storage building was overturned and destroyed, and metal roofing was ripped from a farm outbuilding. Shingles were removed from the roof of a hunting club, the roof was lifted slightly off a house, and the roof of a metal storage building was tossed and overturned. Hundreds of decoy ducks were tossed and broken, and numerous trees were snapped or uprooted in town. | | | | | | |
| EF1 | SE of Spearsville | Union | LA | 32.8654°N 92.5633°W | 08:19–08:23 | 3.05 mi (4.91 km) | 250 yd (230 m) |
| EF1 | This tornado developed within a larger area of damaging winds, snapping trees and completely tearing the metal roofs off of two chicken houses, tossing them hundreds of feet while peeling the tin roof off another chicken house. Several trees at this location snapped and uprooted several hardwood and softwood trees. Metal roofing was ripped off more chicken houses and tossed into fields before the tornado dissipated. | | | | | | |
| EF1 | WNW of North Crossett | Ashley | AR | 33.1768°N 92.0576°W | 08:45–08:52 | 4.45 mi (7.16 km) | 650 yd (590 m) |
| EF1 | Several outbuildings were damaged, several homes lost their shingles while two others suffered more extensive roof damage, and numerous trees were snapped or uprooted. Several homes were impacted by fallen trees, a church sustained moderate roof damage, and several power lines and poles were downed. | | | | | | |
| EF1 | NNW of Hamburg | Ashley | AR | 33.2576°N 91.9609°W | 08:54–09:04 | 9.11 mi (14.66 km) | 800 yd (730 m) |
| EF1 | Dozens of trees were snapped or uprooted, and several were downed onto two mobile homes. A church sustained roof damage, and its covered walkway was blown away. A large front covering to another church was destroyed, with its roof suffering damage as well. Several homes sustained roof damage; tin and insulation were thrown. One person was indirectly injured. | | | | | | |
| EF1 | N of North Crossett to SSE of Hamburg | Ashley | AR | 33.1761°N 91.9441°W | 08:55–09:08 | 10.31 mi (16.59 km) | 800 yd (730 m) |
| EF1 | A large shed was destroyed, with fragments of its roof tossed across the road. A couple of homes sustained roof damage. A large hangar at an airport suffered roof damage and had panels blown out of its back wall. Numerous trees were snapped or uprooted. Power poles and lines were toppled. | | | | | | |
| EF2 | NE of Hamburg to Montrose to W of Cosgrove | Ashley, Chicot | AR | 33.2638°N 91.7598°W | 09:07–09:28 | 20.51 mi (33.01 km) | 1,000 yd (910 m) |
| EF2 | This large, strong tornado first touched down northeast of the town of Hamburg in Ashley County. Moving east-northeastward and quickly intensifying to high-end EF1 strength, the tornado snapped or uprooted many trees, downed five power poles and power lines, and threw a mobile home 15–20 yd (14–18 m). The tornado then turned eastward, rolling and destroying another mobile home, heavily damaging a tractor shed, and downing more power poles and power lines. The tornado then began to move near and along US 82 as it turned back to the east-northeast, damaging a metal building system, downing more power poles and power lines, which included the top of one wooden high-tension segment, and snapping or uprooting hundreds of trees. West of Montrose, three segments of the wooden high-tension poles and lines were taken down at low-end EF2 intensity; some homes also suffered roof damage. Just west of Montrose, the tornado again reached low-end EF2 strength as it downed four more wooden high-tension segments and crossed US 165. Although the strongest part of the tornado passed to the north of Montrose, it still damaged numerous trees in the town, along with roofs of houses, with more trees falling on houses. Just before crossing into Chicot County, the tornado downed a metal high-tension pole segment at high-end EF2 intensity. It steadily weakened after crossing the county line, damaging an outbuilding, downing five more power poles, and uprooting and snapping more trees before dissipating. | | | | | | |
| EF0 | Jerome | Drew | AR | 33.3949°N 91.4714°W | 09:24–09:25 | 0.81 mi (1.30 km) | 150 yd (140 m) |
| EF0 | This tornado caused major damage to a series of large industrial grain and feed silos in Jerome. One silo, bolted into concrete in several places, was ripped out of the ground. The roof of another large silo was tossed 0.5 mi (0.80 km) and broken into pieces. Electrical poles were snapped, and trees were snapped or uprooted. | | | | | | |
| EF2 | W of Lake Village, AR to W of Metcalfe, MS | Chicot (AR), Washington (MS) | AR, MS | 33.3349°N 91.3129°W | 09:33–09:53 | 17.66 mi (28.42 km) | 850 yd (780 m) |
| EF2 | This strong tornado touched down west of Lake Village on the southeast side of the Lake Village Municipal Airport and moved northeastward, rolling and largely destroying a manufactured home, and downing a tree onto a home, injuring one person. The tornado then crossed US 65/US 278/AR 144/Great River Road, downing 8 to 10 wooden electrical poles. A golf country club suffered damage, and more trees were damaged as the tornado moved along AR 144 and Lake Chicot. A trailer was blown across a street, and five more wooden power poles were snapped as well. The tornado then crossed the Mississippi River while moving over the state line three times. Upon crossing Ferguson Lake, the tornado reached its peak strength and blew the second floor off a lake house. The tornado then rapidly weakened, downing power poles, and damaging more trees before dissipating as it crossed MS 1 (Great River Road). | | | | | | |
| EF1 | Chanticleer | Chicot | AR | 33.3027°N 91.284°W | 09:36–9:37 | 0.17 mi (0.27 km) | 15 yd (14 m) |
| EF1 | The center of a metal building collapsed, and a shed was completely destroyed. Some windows were blown out, and portions of tin roofing were peeled off a metal warehouse building. A wooden power pole was snapped as well. | | | | | | |
| EF2 | ESE of Bolivar to Renova (Note: The NCEI map starting point is misaligned from where the tornado is said to have started.) | Bolivar | AR, MS | 33.6658°N 91.0602°W | 09:48–10:11 | 23.38 mi (37.63 km) | 1,800 yd (1,600 m) |
| EF2 | This very large tornado first touched down just outside of Bolivar and moved northeastward just east of the Arkansas-Mississippi border. It first downed trees atop a levee west of Benoit before moving across farmland at EF2 intensity, snapping trees and power poles, and destroying a farm garage, which was tossed 200 yd (180 m), while its concrete anchoring was tossed 100 yd (91 m). The tornado then continued east-northeastward at EF1 strength and crossed MS 1 (Great River Road), damaging an outbuilding, snapping and uprooting trees, snapping numerous power poles, and tossing and destroying a grain silo. The tornado continued to snap trees and power poles as it moved through the Dahomey National Wildlife Refuge and passed south of Pace. The tornado then reached EF2 intensity again as it passed between Pace and Cleveland. It first crossed MS 8, heavily damaging multiple outbuildings, inflicting roof damage to a home, and snapping or damaging up to 100 power poles. Continuing east-northeastward, the tornado snapped several concrete and wooden power poles, snapped or uprooted trees, and inflicted roof damage to well-built homes. It then destroyed several mobile homes, injuring four people. The tornado then passed through Renova as it crossed US 61. More steel and wooden power poles were snapped, multiple outbuildings were damaged or destroyed, and mobile homes and homes suffered roof damage. Shortly after that, the tornado rapidly weakened and dissipated short of the Bolivar-Sunflower county line. | | | | | | |
| EF1 | W of Duncan | Bolivar | MS | 34.0818°N 90.8124°W | 10:02–10:05 | 4.18 mi (6.73 km) | 880 yd (800 m) |
| EF1 | Several homes sustained roof damage, three power poles were downed, and a pivot was knocked over. Trees were snapped and uprooted along the path. | | | | | | |
| EF1 | ESE of Winstonville | Bolivar | MS | 33.8988°N 90.7434°W | 10:07–10:10 | 2.55 mi (4.10 km) | 270 yd (250 m) |
| EF1 | A high-end EF1 tornado downed trees and power lines. | | | | | | |
| EF2 | Rome | Sunflower | MS | 33.9183°N 90.5201°W | 10:18–10:25 | 5.54 mi (8.92 km) | 1,700 yd (1,600 m) |
| EF2 | Several homes and businesses in Rome, including a post office, were destroyed. Minor damage occurred on the grounds of a state penitentiary, and several wooden power poles were snapped. | | | | | | |
| EF2 | N of Drew | Sunflower | MS | 33.8224°N 90.5682°W | 10:19–10:26 | 5.43 mi (8.74 km) | 850 yd (780 m) |
| EF2 | A mobile home was completely destroyed, with its undercarriage and contents thrown downwind. Trees and power lines were knocked down as well. | | | | | | |
| EF0 | NW of Sumner | Tallahatchie | MS | 33.9798°N 90.4099°W | 10:26–10:28 | 2.24 mi (3.60 km) | 100 yd (91 m) |
| EF0 | A grain bin, a barn, and trees were damaged, and 30 train cars were derailed. | | | | | | |
| EF1 | N of Troy | Obion | TN | 36.3671°N 89.1916°W | 10:38–10:40 | 1.86 mi (2.99 km) | 150 yd (140 m) |
| EF1 | Several barns and outbuildings were severely damaged or destroyed. Trees and the roofs of homes were damaged. | | | | | | |
| EF1 | SE of Hernando | Tate, DeSoto | MS | 34.6979°N 90.1309°W | 10:42–10:52 | 11.27 mi (18.14 km) | 200 yd (180 m) |
| EF1 | A tornado caused damage to trees, sheds, roofs, residences, and storage buildings. | | | | | | |
| EF1 | SSE of Bobo to W of Bateman | Quitman, Panola | MS | 34.26°N 90.175°W | 10:45–10:51 | 5.67 mi (9.12 km) | 150 yd (140 m) |
| EF1 | Numerous homes and an outbuilding were damaged. Two mobile homes suffered significant roof damage. | | | | | | |
| EF2 | NE of Hernando to S of Olive Branch | DeSoto | MS | 34.8576°N 89.9206°W | 10:53–11:01 | 8.21 mi (13.21 km) | 300 yd (270 m) |
| EF2 | A strong tornado damaged trees and signs. A stable and a large metal building were heavily damaged. Numerous homes were damaged, some severely. | | | | | | |
| EF0 | E of Como | Panola, Tate | MS | 34.5045°N 89.8584°W | 11:04–11:12 | 7.25 mi (11.67 km) | 150 yd (140 m) |
| EF0 | A few barns suffered significant damage. Numerous trees were damaged. | | | | | | |
| EF1 | Stubblefield | Graves | KY | 36.61°N 88.7°W | 11:17–11:19 | 1.98 mi (3.19 km) | 230 yd (210 m) |
| EF1 | Three buildings at a chicken farm were substantially damaged, while a fourth suffered moderate damage, and the remaining two sustained minor impacts. Metal roofing was tossed into the tops of trees at least 50–60 ft (15–18 m) in height. A house and some trees were damaged as well. Damage was estimated to be nearly 2 million dollars. | | | | | | |
| EF0 | S of Marianna | Marshall | MS | 34.6550°N 89.6108°W | 11:21–11:28 | 5.85 mi (9.41 km) | 70 yd (64 m) |
| EF0 | Trees and a couple of manufactured homes were damaged. | | | | | | |
| EF0 | SE of Williston | Fayette | TN | 35.1294°N 89.3431°W | 11:36–11:38 | 1.98 mi (3.19 km) | 90 yd (82 m) |
| EF0 | Trees were uprooted, and homes sustained minor damage. A mobile home sustained minor damage. | | | | | | |
| EF1 | W of Benton | Marshall | KY | 36.85°N 88.38°W | 11:42–11:45 | 2.34 mi (3.77 km) | 25 yd (23 m) |
| EF1 | The roof was blown off a barn, and numerous trees were uprooted and snapped. | | | | | | |
| EF0 | Hillside | Weakley | TN | 36.2574°N 88.8041°W | 11:58-11:59 | 0.08 mi (0.13 km) | 75 yd (69 m) |
| EF0 | Outbuildings and sheds were destroyed. Multiple trees were downed. | | | | | | |
| EF2 | N of Krotz Springs | St. Landry | LA | 30.5922°N 91.7641°W | 12:04–12:06 | 1.2 mi (1.9 km) | 125 yd (114 m) |
| EF2 | The roofs, awnings, and patios of several homes were damaged. A mobile home was flipped over and destroyed, with debris displaced over 0.5 mi (0.80 km). Another mobile home was rolled over, resulting in four injuries, while two more were knocked off their pilings and had their windows broken. Farm equipment was damaged by flying debris, and trees were snapped or downed. | | | | | | |
| EF1 | SW of Baldwyn to Wheeler | Lee, Prentiss | MS | 34.4938°N 88.7007°W | 12:45–12:52 | 7.23 mi (11.64 km) | 100 yd (91 m) |
| EF1 | Several commercial buildings were damaged. Trees were downed and uprooted, and a few trees fell on homes in town. The roof of a high school and an industrial building were damaged. | | | | | | |
| EF1 | SE of Fenton | Trigg | KY | 36.72°N 88.07°W | 12:50–12:56 | 4.48 mi (7.21 km) | 75 yd (69 m) |
| EF1 | Dozens of trees were snapped and uprooted, and a microburst downed and uprooted even more trees across a lake. | | | | | | |
| EF1 | S of Bonneville to N of Altitude | Prentiss | MS | 34.5963°N 88.5353°W | 12:56–13:03 | 8.22 mi (13.23 km) | 150 yd (140 m) |
| EF1 | A large barn, four mobile homes, a residence, and several buildings at a lumber processing facility were damaged. | | | | | | |
| EF0 | NE of Canton | Trigg | KY | 36.8321°N 87.932°W | 13:00–13:06 | 4.18 mi (6.73 km) | 50 yd (46 m) |
| EF0 | Several homes suffered minor roof damage while one sustained moderate damage. A metal building had its garage door blown in, and a large tree branch fell on a vehicle. A carport was shifted off its supports, and several trees were snapped or uprooted along the path. | | | | | | |
| EF1 | Hopson to Pennyrile Forest State Resort Park | Caldwell, Christian | KY | 36.9862°N 87.8431°W | 13:05–13:19 | 10.02 mi (16.13 km) | 250 yd (230 m) |
| EF1 | At least a half dozen barns or outbuildings were damaged or destroyed. Four wooden high-tension power poles were toppled, and dozens of trees were snapped or uprooted. | | | | | | |
| EF1 | NE of Altitude to S of Burnsville | Prentiss, Tishomingo | MS | 34.7276°N 88.3934°W | 13:08–13:14 | 5.71 mi (9.19 km) | 120 yd (110 m) |
| EF1 | Several homes and storage buildings, in addition to trees, were damaged. | | | | | | |
| EF1 | Friendship to Pennyrile Forest State Resort Park | Caldwell, Christian | KY | 37.05°N 87.78°W | 13:12–13:20 | 7.49 mi (12.05 km) | 175 yd (160 m) |
| EF1 | One barn was destroyed, and another one was damaged. One of the barns had its roof tossed across a road, and a house lost some siding. Hundreds of trees were snapped or uprooted as well. | | | | | | |
| EF0 | SE of Burnsville | Tishomingo | MS | 34.8160°N 88.2900°W | 13:17–13:18 | 0.72 mi (1.16 km) | 80 yd (73 m) |
| EF0 | A residence, trees, and power poles suffered minor damage. | | | | | | |
| EF1 | N of Hawkins | Christian | KY | 37.0565°N 87.6518°W | 13:19–13:23 | 2.98 mi (4.80 km) | 200 yd (180 m) |
| EF1 | A few barns were damaged or blown down, and a couple of houses suffered shingle and fascia loss. Dozens of trees were snapped or uprooted as well. | | | | | | |
| EF1 | ESE of Howel to NNW of Pembroke | Christian | KY | 36.6912°N 87.5107°W | 13:34–13:44 | 10.94 mi (17.61 km) | 100 yd (91 m) |
| EF1 | Several barns were damaged or destroyed, including one that had its roof tossed several hundred yards into trees. Power lines were downed, 13 empty rail cars were tipped over, and a couple of homes suffered minor damage. | | | | | | |
| EF1 | SE of Hopkinsville | Christian | KY | 36.8143°N 87.4434°W | 13:40–13:43 | 2.61 mi (4.20 km) | 50 yd (46 m) |
| EF1 | Several trees were snapped, and a barn suffered partial damage to its roof. | | | | | | |
| EF0 | Forest | Scott | MS | 32.3707°N 89.4785°W | 15:33–15:37 | 2.69 mi (4.33 km) | 250 yd (230 m) |
| EF0 | A weak tornado caused minor roof damage to a small barn, and snapped numerous hardwood and softwood tree limbs in the town of Forest. | | | | | | |
| EF2 | NNE of Sapps to S of Beards Mill | Pickens | AL | 33.2379°N 88.1545°W | 17:11–17:20 | 6.33 mi (10.19 km) | 1,056 yd (966 m) |
| EF2 | 3 deaths – This large, high-end EF2 tornado caused varying degrees of roof and structural damage to at least 22 homes to the west of Carrollton. Six site-built homes and four manufactured homes, three of which were anchored, were destroyed. The four manufactured homes were thrown considerable distances away, and three fatalities occurred in two of them. Two barns were heavily damaged, and many trees were downed along the path. Seven people were injured. | | | | | | |
| EF0 | Holly Pond | Cullman | AL | 34.1749°N 86.6197°W | 19:03–19:08 | 0.21 mi (0.34 km) | 80 yd (73 m) |
| EF0 | A restaurant in Holly Pond sustained roof damage and had its siding wrapped around a cell phone tower, while a high school sustained minimal roof and awning damage. Trees were damaged as well. | | | | | | |
| EF1 | Joppa to SW of Hog Jaw | Cullman, Marshall | AL | 34.3°N 86.5571°W | 19:13–19:15 | 1.84 mi (2.96 km) | 60 yd (55 m) |
| EF1 | This tornado touched down in Joppa, where trees were downed, some of which landed on homes. The tornado tracked northeastward along SR 69, where numerous additional trees were snapped and uprooted, some of which also landed on buildings and caused minor structural damage. An outbuilding lost its roof as well. | | | | | | |
| EF2 | Union Grove | Marshall | AL | 34.3974°N 86.4466°W | 19:19–19:24 | 0.22 mi (0.35 km) | 150 yd (140 m) |
| EF2 | This strong tornado destroyed ten classrooms, the cafeteria, and the gymnasium at Brindlee Mountain Primary School. Numerous beams in the roof of the gym were twisted and bent, and large bolts used to attach the gym to the foundation were ripped from the structure. A set of bleachers was hurled over 150 yd (140 m) from one side of the school to the other. Several dumpsters were displaced, and three or four power poles were snapped, the latter of which led to additional damage to the school's roof and awning. Several trees were snapped or uprooted. The school was closed permanently and donated to the city of Union Grove. | | | | | | |
| EF0 | N of Hiram to S of Lost Mountain | Paulding, Cobb | GA | 33.9108°N 84.7582°W | 21:52–21:56 | 3.86 mi (6.21 km) | 400 yd (370 m) |
| EF0 | Dozens of trees were snapped or uprooted, and one tree fell on a home. | | | | | | |
| EF1 | NW of Suches | Fannin | GA | 34.7415°N 84.1414°W | 22:24–22:27 | 3.05 mi (4.91 km) | 450 yd (410 m) |
| EF1 | Hundreds of trees were downed, damaging at least four homes. A 40 ft (12 m) steel radio tower was toppled as well. (Note: The NCEI lists the event as EF0, but the report summary says the tornado was rated EF1.) | | | | | | |
| EF1 | SSE of Woodbury | Upson | GA | 32.9134°N 84.5255°W | 22:48–22:49 | 0.34 mi (0.55 km) | 100 yd (91 m) |
| EF1 | A river home was knocked off its stilts and destroyed, and another home was damaged, both by falling trees. A camper was blown over, and a boat was blown into a tree. About 100 trees and several power poles were snapped or blown over as well. | | | | | | |
| EF1 | SE of Bakerhill | Barbour | AL | 31.7633°N 85.3100°W | 22:33–22:41 | 5.8 mi (9.3 km) | 275 yd (251 m) |
| EF1 | A low-end EF1 tornado tore vinyl siding off the right side of a brick home, destroyed an outbuilding, and snapped or downed numerous trees. | | | | | | |
| EF0 | NewTazewell to NE of Tazewell | Claiborne | TN | 36.4452°N 83.6048°W | 22:55–22:58 | 3.3 mi (5.3 km) | 30 yd (27 m) |
| EF0 | Half the roof of a barn was blown off, a house had many shingles and two window shutters blown off, and a second house sustained front porch damage. Numerous trees were snapped or uprooted, one of which fell onto and damaged a third home. | | | | | | |
| EF0 | SW of Townville | Anderson | SC | 34.55°N 82.914°W | 01:04–01:05 | 0.44 mi (0.71 km) | 30 yd (27 m) |
| EF0 | A weak anticyclonic tornado embedded within a larger area of damaging straight-line winds, downed trees, and removed metal sheeting from an outbuilding. | | | | | | |
| EF0 | NE of Townville | Anderson | SC | 34.5833°N 82.8697°W | 01:06–01:07 | 0.27 mi (0.43 km) | 50 yd (46 m) |
| EF0 | A second anticyclonic tornado formed after the previous one dissipated. Trees were uprooted or snapped. | | | | | | |
| EF0 | S of Piedmont | Anderson | SC | 34.68°N 82.472°W | 01:40–01:42 | 0.66 mi (1.06 km) | 160 yd (150 m) |
| EF0 | A carport was dislodged and destroyed, and trees were snapped or uprooted. | | | | | | |
| EF0 | W of Greenwood | Abbeville, Greenwood | SC | 34.182°N 82.259°W | 01:40–01:44 | 2.44 mi (3.93 km) | 50 yd (46 m) |
| EF0 | Part of the roof of a barn was torn off, and its metal door was blown inward. Several large pine trees were uprooted or snapped as well. | | | | | | |
| EF0 | S of Cokesbury | Greenwood | SC | 34.239°N 82.208°W | 01:45–01:46 | 0.53 mi (0.85 km) | 30 yd (27 m) |
| EF0 | Large tree limbs were broken off several trees. At least two other trees were uprooted. One home suffered minor roof damage. | | | | | | |
| EF0 | Troy | Miami | OH | 40.0305°N 84.2271°W | 03:11–03:13 | 3.1 mi (5.0 km) | 350 yd (320 m) |
| EF0 | A number of structures suffered minor and intermittent roof damage, although a couple of older businesses in the downtown area did lose most or all of their roofs. Falling bricks severely damaged several vehicles in downtown Troy, and trees were also damaged. | | | | | | |
| EF0 | Southern Fletcher | Miami | OH | 40.1060°N 84.1758°W | 03:15–03:21 | 6.34 mi (10.20 km) | 175 yd (160 m) |
| EF0 | Trees were broken, the roofs of barns and outbuildings were damaged, and electrical poles were snapped. Residences in the southern part of town sustained shingle and soffit damage, and some homes were damaged by fallen trees. | | | | | | |
| EF2 | SSE of Kershaw | Kershaw | SC | 34.4293°N 80.5303°W | 03:33–03:35 | 0.55 mi (0.89 km) | 150 yd (140 m) |
| EF2 | This brief, but strong tornado impacted North Central High School, partially collapsing concrete stadium bleachers, a press box, and the exterior wall of the western side of the structure. All of the HVAC units were tossed off the roof, and most of the roof was ripped off the main office and an older auditorium. A total of 4 school buses were moved while 25–30 more suffered broken windows and other damage. A small building beyond the school's parking lot was destroyed. Numerous trees were snapped. Strong inflow into the tornado collapsed two large light stands and displaced a Conex shipping container about 50 yd (46 m). | | | | | | |

=== Sligo–Haughton–Sibley–Hurricane, Louisiana ===
Sligo–Haughton–Sibley–Hurricane, Louisiana
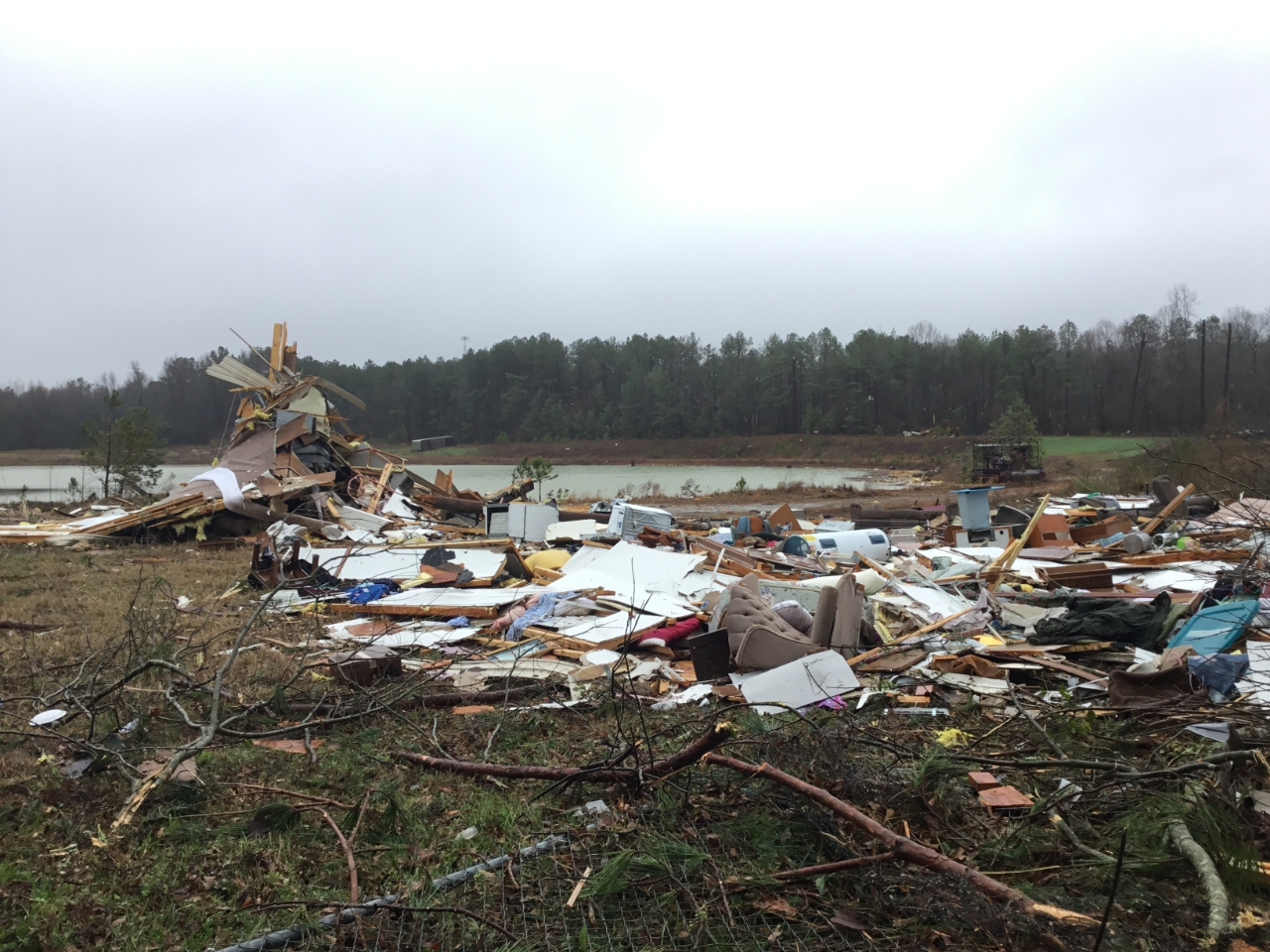
- High-end EF2 damage to a mobile home near Haugthon, Louisiana. Two people were killed in this home.

Meteorological history
- Formed: January 11, 2020, 1:24 p.m. CST (UTC−06:00)
- Dissipated: January 11, 2020, 2:05 p.m. CST (UTC−06:00)
- Duration: 41 minutes

EF2 tornado
- on the Enhanced Fujita scale
- Highest winds: 135 mph (217 km/h)

Overall effects
- Fatalities: 3
- Damage: $1.325 million (2020 USD)

This deadly high-end EF2 tornado first touched down in Sligo north of LA 612 and quickly intensified as it moved northeastward, snapping and uprooting hundreds of trees and damaging several carports and outbuildings. More trees were downed as the tornado clipped the southeast side of the Barksdale Air Force Base, before it reached its peak intensity south of Haughton. Two mobile homes, one double-wide and one single wide, were completely destroyed at high-end EF2 strength as the tornado crossed Davis Road. Two people were killed in the double wide mobile home and one was killed in the single-wide. The tornado continued to cause EF2 damage as it crossed LA 158 in Eastern Bossier Parish, snapping and uprooting hundreds of trees, some of which fell on homes, while other homes suffered roof damage. The tornado then weakened to high-end EF1 strength as it crossed Oliver Road and Camp Zion Road, where numerous trees were snapped and uprooted, siding was ripped off of a single-wide manufactured home. A portion of the metal exterior and doors on the Bossier Parish Fire District 1 Station 6 building was ripped off, along with some vinyl siding to a mobile home living quarters located next door.

The tornado, still at high-end EF1 strength, then moved into Webster Parish, crossing Pilgrim Rest Road, and tracking northeast into the south side of Doyline, downing hundreds of trees as it crossed LA 163 and 164. After clipping the southeast corner of Camp Minden, the tornado ripped through the north side of Sibley along US 371/LA 7 and the northern fringes of Dubberly, where it downed trees and power lines, damaged a metal barn, the roof of a home, and destroyed a shed on Wallraven Road near LA 531. At the South Webster Industrial Park in Sibley, an 18-wheeler trailer was overturned, and a building, fencing, and equipment were damaged at an oil field service company. Significant damage was also done to the major power distribution lines that feed the town of Sibley and the South Webster Industrial District. Just before the tornado crossed I-20 between exits 49 and 52, the rear flank downdraft near and just south of the tornado track grew and intensified, blowing down a large sign onto another 18-wheeler at Love's Truckstop at I-20 Exit 49 (LA 531). After crossing the interstate southeast of Minden, the tornado moved through Nine Forks at the intersection of US 80 and LA 532, rolling a single-wide mobile home on Fuller Cemetery Road and damaging the roofs of two structures. At least 120 broken power poles and over 250 spans of downed wire were the result of this tornado and associated widespread damaging winds near Doyline, Sibley, Dubberly, and Minden.

The tornado then moved into Southwestern Claiborne Parish, causing intermittent damage. Numerous trees were snapped or uprooted as it crossed Harris Road, Old Arcadia Road, Faulk Road, Sherrill Road, and LA 154 in Darley south of Old Athens and Athens. The tornado then turned due east and crossed LA 9, producing partial roof damage to approximately a half dozen chicken houses and shingle and partial roof damage to several other structures, especially off of Buckner Road, Cook Road, and LA 519 in the rural community of Hurricane before finally dissipating.

The tornado was on the ground for 41 minutes, traveled 42.06 miles (67.69 km), and was 300 yards (270 m) wide. Three people were killed, and damage was estimated at $1.325 million.

== See also ==
- List of North American tornadoes and tornado outbreaks
