= Liberty, Alabama =

Liberty, Alabama may refer to one of several places in the US state of Alabama:

- Liberty, Blount County, Alabama in Blount County
- Liberty, Butler County, Alabama in Butler County
- Liberty, DeKalb County, Alabama in DeKalb County
- Liberty, Pickens County, Alabama in Pickens County

== See also ==
- List of places in Alabama
