= Zion, Alabama =

Unincorporated community in Alabama, United States

- Unincorporated community
- Location within Alabama Location within the United States
- Coordinates: 33°25′16″N 87°52′39″W
- Country: United States
- State: Alabama
- County: Pickens
- Elevation: 443 ft (135 m)
- Time zone: UTC-6 (Central (CST))
  - Summer (DST): UTC-5 (CDT)
- Area codes: 205, 659
- GNIS feature ID: 129326

Zion is an unincorporated community in Pickens County, Alabama, United States. Zion is located along Alabama State Route 159, 8.0 miles (12.9 km) north of Gordo. The Zion community also has a local convenience store affectionately named Zion Mall. The Zion Mall serves as a hub for community, fresh produce, deli, and county-renowned apple fritters. The Zion community has a community center, which once served as a local schoolhouse.
