= Lubbub, Alabama =

Unincorporated community in Alabama, United States

- Unincorporated community
- Location within Alabama Location within the United States
- Coordinates: 33°25′50″N 87°52′26″W
- Country: United States
- State: Alabama
- County: Pickens
- Elevation: 453 ft (138 m)
- Time zone: UTC-6 (Central (CST))
  - Summer (DST): UTC-5 (CDT)
- Area codes: 205, 659
- GNIS feature ID: 135564

Lubbub is an unincorporated community in Pickens County, Alabama, United States. Lubbub is located along Alabama State Route 159, 8.8 miles (14.2 km) north of Gordo.

== History ==
Lubbub is named after the nearby Lubbub Creek. The name Lubbub comes from the Choctaw word lahba, which means "warm". A post office operated under the name Lubbub from 1834 to 1907. An EF4 tornado passed near Lubbub during the 2011 Super Outbreak.
