= Michael Williams (tight end) =

American football player (born 1990)

No. 85
- Position: Tight end

Personal information
- Born: September 8, 1990 (age 36); Reform, Alabama, U.S.
- Listed height: 6 ft 6 in (1.98 m)
- Listed weight: 269 lb (122 kg)

Career information
- High school: Pickens County (AL)
- College: Alabama
- NFL draft: 2013: 7th round, 211th overall pick

Career history
- Detroit Lions (2013–2014); New England Patriots (2015–2016)

Awards and highlights
- Super Bowl champion (LI); 3× BCS national champion (2010, 2012, 2013)

Career NFL statistics
- Receptions: 3
- Receiving yards: 26
- Stats at Pro Football Reference

Michael Williams (born September 8, 1990) is an American former professional football player who was a tight end in the National Football League (NFL). He played college football for the Alabama Crimson Tide and was selected by the Detroit Lions in the seventh round (211th overall) in the 2013 NFL draft.

== Early life ==
Williams attended Pickens County High School in Alabama. He earned All-County, All-Area and honorable mention All-State honors while playing basketball in high school. While at high school, he also earned the 2007 Alabama Sports Writers Association All-State honors as a Tight end on the first-team and also was selected as the ASWA Class 2A lineman of the year. He was a member of The Mobile Press-Register Elite 18 while at High School. He earned first-team All-State honors in his Junior season and also was an Honorable mention as a Tight end while at high school.

College recruiting
Name	Hometown	School	Height	Weight	40^{‡}	Commit date
Michael Williams; Defensive end	Reform, Alabama	Pickens County high school	6 ft 6 in (1.98 m)	240 lb (110 kg)	4.7	Feb 16, 2007
Michael Williams; Defensive end	Recruit ratings: Scout: Rivals:					
Overall recruit ranking: Scout: 17 (DE) Rivals: 4 (DE), 148 (National), 10 (Alabama)
‡ Refers to 40-yard dash; Note: In many cases, Scout, Rivals, 247Sports, On3, and ESPN may conflict in their listings of height, weight and 40 time.; In these cases, the average was taken. ESPN grades are on a 100-point scale.; Sources: "2008 Alabama Football Commitments". Rivals.; "2008 Alabama Football Recruiting Commits". Scout.; "Scout.com Team Recruiting Rankings". Scout.; "2008 Team Ranking". Rivals.com.

== College career ==
Williams played College football at Alabama. He finished college with a total of 51 receptions, 503 receiving yards along with seven touchdowns. On January 7, 2013, he had 3 receptions, 17 receiving yards, and one receiving touchdown against Notre Dame in the 2013 BCS National Championship Game. In January 2013, he was added to the Senior Bowl roster.

== Professional career ==
=== Detroit Lions ===
In the 2013 NFL draft, Williams was selected in the 7th round (211th overall) by the Detroit Lions. On August 22, 2013, Williams broke his hand during a preseason game against the New England Patriots. On August 31, 2013, Williams was placed on injured reserve.

After the draft of tight end Eric Ebron, it was announced that Williams would be moved to offensive tackle and would wear the number 73.

=== New England Patriots ===
On August 25, 2015, the Lions traded Williams to the New England Patriots in exchange for a 2017 seventh-round draft pick. Williams was assigned No. 85, indicating a return to tight end.

During the 2015 season, Williams appeared in 15 regular season games (with nine starts) and caught three passes for 26 yards. Williams also appeared in both of the Patriots playoff games and started in the AFC Championship Game against the Denver Broncos on January 24, 2016.

On June 8, 2016, Williams suffered a torn ACL during practice. On June 10, 2016, he was waived/injured by the Patriots and was reverted to injured reserve, missing the entire 2016 season. On February 5, 2017, Williams's Patriots appeared in Super Bowl LI. In the game, the Patriots defeated the Atlanta Falcons by a score of 34–28 in overtime.

On March 9, 2017, Williams re-signed with the Patriots on a one-year deal. On May 12, 2017, Williams was released by the Patriots.

== Coaching career ==
Williams is currently the head football coach at his alma mater, Pickens County High School in Reform, Alabama.
