= Pickens County High School =

Pickens County High School may refer to:

- Pickens High School (Georgia)
- Pickens County High School (Alabama) - See Pickens County School District (Alabama)
