= Wayne Davis (linebacker) =

American football player (born 1964)

No. 53, 57
- Position: Linebacker

Personal information
- Born: March 10, 1964 (age 62); Tuscaloosa, Alabama, U.S.
- Listed height: 6 ft 1 in (1.85 m)
- Listed weight: 213 lb (97 kg)

Career information
- High school: Gordo (Gordo, Alabama)
- College: Alabama
- NFL draft: 1987: 9th round, 229th overall pick

Career history
- St. Louis/Phoenix Cardinals (1987–1988); San Francisco 49ers (1989)*; Los Angeles Rams (1989)*; Orlando Thunder (1991–1992)
- * Offseason or practice squad member only

Awards and highlights
- Alabama record for most tackles in a career (327)

Career NFL statistics
- Fumble recoveries: 1
- Stats at Pro Football Reference

Wayne Davis (born March 10, 1964) is an American former professional football player who was a linebacker in the National Football League (NFL) for two seasons with the St. Louis/Phoenix Cardinals. He played college football for the Alabama Crimson Tide and was selected in the ninth round of the 1987 NFL draft. After being released by Phoenix, Davis played for the San Francisco 49ers and Los Angeles Rams in the 1989 preseason before being drafted by the Orlando Thunder of the World League of American Football (WLAF).

A native of Tuscaloosa, Alabama, Davis played college football at the University of Alabama where he established the school record for tackles in a career with 327.

His son, Ben Davis, was ranked as the No. 1 linebacker in the high school class of 2016 by ESPN, and committed to play at Alabama.
