= List of shipwrecks in May 1848 =

The list of shipwrecks in May 1848 includes ships sunk, foundered, wrecked, grounded, or otherwise lost during May 1848.

== 1 May ==
List of shipwrecks: 1 May 1848
Ship	State	Description
Iron	United Kingdom	The ship was driven ashore on the coast of Zeeland, Netherlands. She was on a voyage from Cardiff, Glamorgan to Hamburg.
Mary	United Kingdom	The ship struck the pier at "Falhom" and sank. She was on a voyage from Cardiff, Glamorgan to Newry, County Antrim.

== 2 May ==
List of shipwrecks: 2 May 1848
Ship	State	Description
Breeze	United Kingdom	The ship ran aground on the Domesnes Reef, in the Baltic Sea and was wrecked with the loss of all eight crew.
Hoffnung	Stettin	The ship was driven ashore near Memel, Prussia. She was on a voyage from Stettin to Memel.
Yamohi	United States	The ship was driven ashore at New York. She was on a voyage from Canton, China to New York.

== 3 May ==
List of shipwrecks: 3 May 1848
Ship	State	Description
Chieftain	United Kingdom	The ship was driven ashore and wrecked on Mouille Point, Mauritius. She was on a voyage from Mauritius to the Cape of Good Hope, Cape Colony.
Tancred	United Kingdom	The brig, which had sprung a leak on 23 April, was abandoned in the Atlantic Ocean off the Isles of Scilly. Her eight crew were rescued by Merlin (United Kingdom). Tancred was on a voyage from Liverpool, Lancashire to Quebec City, Province of Canada, British North America.

== 4 May ==
List of shipwrecks: 4 May 1848
Ship	State	Description
Brothers	United Kingdom	The brig was wrecked at Tampico, Mexico.
Indus	United Kingdom	The ship was holed by ice and sank 30 nautical miles (56 km) south east by east of Scatterie Island, Nova Scotia, British North America. Her crew were rescued. She was on a voyage from Hartlepool, County Durham to Quebec City, Province of Canada, British North America.
Lady of the Lake	United States	The schooner was in collision with the brig Radical (United Kingdom) and foundered in the Atlantic Ocean (42°40′N 67°30′W). Her eight crew were rescued by Radical. Lady of the Lake was on a voyage from Portsmouth, New Hampshire to Chaleur Bay.

== 5 May ==
List of shipwrecks: 5 May 1848
Ship	State	Description
Charles	(United Kingdom of Great Britain and Ireland) Jersey	The ship foundered in the English Channel off Saint-Vaast-la-Hougue, Manche, France. Her crew were rescued.
Vine	(United Kingdom of Great Britain and Ireland) British North America	The ship was holed by ice and was beached in the Gut of Canso. She was on a voyage from Halifax, Nova Scotia to Prince Edward Island.

== 7 May ==
List of shipwrecks: 7 May 1848
Ship	State	Description
Mary Ann	United Kingdom	The ship ran aground and was severely damaged in the Hooghly River. She was on a voyage from London to Calcutta, India. She was refloated on 3 June and taken in to Calcutta.
Vancouver	United Kingdom	The ship was wrecked at the mouth of the Columbia River. All on board were rescued.

== 8 May ==
List of shipwrecks: 8 May 1848
Ship	State	Description
Vancouver	United Kingdom	The barque was wrecked in the mouth of the Columbia River with vessel and cargo a total loss.

== 10 May ==
List of shipwrecks: 10 May 1848
Ship	State	Description
Lord Morpeth	United Kingdom	The ship foundered in the English Channel 3 nautical miles (5.6 km) south west of Beachy Head, Sussex.
Queen	United Kingdom	The paddle tug struck the Longcraig Rock and sank. She was refloated on 12 May with assistance from two sloops and a steam tug and was towed in to Leith, Lothian. Subsequently repaired and returned to service.
Star	United Kingdom	The schooner ran aground at Sunderland, County Durham. She was refloated and put back to Sunderland.

== 11 May ==
List of shipwrecks: 12 May 1848
Ship	State	Description
Hemisphere	United States	The ship was driven ashore near Salem, Massachusetts. She was on a voyage from Boston, Massachusetts to Maitland, Florida. She was later refloated.
Susan	United Kingdom	The ship was lost at "St. Purris", Newfoundland, British North America. Her crew were rescued.
Vineyard	(United Kingdom of Great Britain and Ireland) British North America	The schooner was driven ashore at Cape New Waggon, Province of Canada. She was on a voyage from Boston, Massachusetts to Saint John, New Brunswick.

== 12 May ==
List of shipwrecks: 12 May 1848
Ship	State	Description
Arethusa	United Kingdom	The ship was driven ashore at Helsingør, Denmark. She was on a voyage from Stettin to Aberdeen. She was refloated the next day and resumed her voyage.
Astoria	United Kingdom	The ship struck a sunken rock and capsized near Gaspé, Province of Canada, British North America. Her crew were rescued. She was on a voyage from London to Quebec City, Province of Canada.
Schah Jehan	United Kingdom	The ship was driven ashore in the Firth of Clyde near Dunoon, Ayrshire. She was on a voyage from Greenock, Renfrewshire to Calcutta, India.

== 13 May ==
List of shipwrecks: 13 May 1848
Ship	State	Description
Lumley	United Kingdom	The ship was driven ashore in the Saint Lawrence River. Her crew were rescued. She was refloated on 12 August and taken in to Quebec City, Province of Canada, British North America.

== 14 May ==
List of shipwrecks: 14 May 1848
Ship	State	Description
Theodosia	United Kingdom	The ship was driven ashore on Goose Island, British North America. She was on a voyage from Newcastle upon Tyne, Northumberland to Quebec City, Province of Canada, British North America. She was refloated and taken in to Quebec City in a leaky condition.
Triune	United Kingdom	The ship was driven ashore and damaged on Anticosti Island, Cape Sable Island, Nova Scotia. British North America before 13 May. She was later refloated but foundered off Cape St. Anne. Four crew were rescued by Energy (United Kingdom).

== 15 May ==
List of shipwrecks: 15 May 1848
Ship	State	Description
Louisa	United Kingdom	The ship was in collision with Albion (Norway) in the North Sea and was abandoned. She was on a voyage from Seaham, County Durham to London. She was subsequently taken in to Great Yarmouth, Norfolk.
Montefiores	United Kingdom	The brig was driven ashore and wrecked at Ganjam, India. Her crew were rescued.
Queen	United Kingdom	The ship was driven ashore on Dagö, Russia. She was on a voyage from Cardiff, Glamorgan to Saint Petersburg, Russia. She was refloated but drove ashore in Polody Bay. Her crew were rescued. Subsequently refloated and taken in to "Rockshaven".
Susan	United Kingdom	The ship ran aground on the Barber Sand, in the North Sea off the coast of Norfolk, and sank. She was on a voyage from Newcastle upon Tyne, Northumberland to Colchester, Essex.
Wupper	United Kingdom	The ship was driven ashore at Great Yarmouth. She was on a voyage from Rotterdam, South Holland, Netherlands to Hull, Yorkshire. She was refloated.

== 16 May ==
List of shipwrecks: 16 May 1848
Ship	State	Description
Euphrates	United Kingdom	The ship ran aground and was damaged at Dublin. She was on a voyage from Dublin to Liverpool, Lancashire.
British Lady	United Kingdom	The brig was driven ashore on Prince Edward Island, British North America with the loss of three of her crew. She was on a voyage from Liverpool to "Port Hill", Prince Edward Island. She was consequently condemned.

== 17 May ==
List of shipwrecks: 17 May 1848
Ship	State	Description
Ayrshire	United Kingdom	The ship ran aground on the Île d'Orleans, Province of Canada, British North America. Some of her passengers were taken off by the steamship St. George ( (United Kingdom of Great Britain and Ireland) British North America). Ayrshire was on a voyage from Newry, County Antrim to Quebec City, Province of Canada. She was refloated and taken in to Quebec City, where she arrived on 18 May.
Mathilde	Hamburg	The ship capsized at Ramsgate, Kent, United Kingdom and was severely damaged. She was on a voyage from Hamburg to Lisbon, Portugal.
Paragon	United Kingdom	The ship was driven ashore at Thurso, Caithness. She was on a voyage from Hamburg to an American port. She was refloated and taken in to Scrabster, Caithness.

== 20 May ==
List of shipwrecks: June 1848
Ship	State	Description
Cranton	United Kingdom	The ship was wrecked on Cape Negro, Nova Scotia, British North America Her crew were rescued.
F. M. C. Hardy	United Kingdom	The schooner was driven ashore at San Pedro del Pinatar, Spain. She was refloated and put in to Cartagena, Spain.
Princess	United Kingdom	The ship was wrecked on Cape Sable Island, Nova Scotia. Her crew were rescued

== 18 May ==
List of shipwrecks: 18 May 1848
Ship	State	Description
Lady Huntley	United Kingdom	The barque was wrecked in the West Indies. Her crew were rescued.
Rowena	(United Kingdom of Great Britain and Ireland) Jersey	The schooner was wrecked on the Hartwell Reef. Her crew were rescued. She was on a voyage from Jersey to Rio de Janeiro, Brazil.

== 19 May ==
List of shipwrecks: 19 May 1848
Ship	State	Description
Mary Whitney	United States	The ship was run aground on the Bass Rip, off Nantucket, Massachusetts. She was on a voyage from Newport, Rhode Island to Boston, Massachusetts. She was refloated and arrived at Boston then next day in a severely leaky condition.

== 21 May ==
List of shipwrecks: 21 May 1848
Ship	State	Description
Adele	Belgium	The brig struck the Longships and was abandoned. Her crw were rescued by the sloop Three Sisters (United Kingdom). Adele was subsequently driven ashore and wrecked between Land's End and Cape Cornwall, Cornwall, United Kingdom. Her crew were rescued. She was on a voyage from Liverpool, Lancashire, United Kingdom to Ostend, West Flanders.
Athens	United States	The brig was driven ashore in the Scheldt near Lillo, Antwerp, Belgium. She was on a voyage from Matanzas, Cuba to Antwerp city. She was refloated on 24 May with assistance from the steamship Gazelle (Belgium) and taken in to Antwerp in a leaky condition.

== 22 May ==
List of shipwrecks: 22 May 1848
Ship	State	Description
Eagle	United Kingdom	The brig struck a sunken rock at Galway and was holed.
General Sir William Nott	United Kingdom	The ship caught fire in the Atlantic Ocean and was abandoned. Her crew were rescued by Liverpool (United Kingdom). General Sir William Nott was on a voyage from Cuba to Swansea, Glamorgan.
John Fleming	United Kingdom	The full-rigged ship was wrecked at Ganjam, India. Her crew were rescued.

== 23 May ==
List of shipwrecks: 23 May 1848
Ship	State	Description
Emily	United Kingdom	The ship was driven ashore on Kotlin Island, Russia. She was on a voyage from Newcastle upon Tyne, Northumberland to Kronstadt, Russia. She was refloated the next day.
Ingonville	France	The schooner was wrecked 5 nautical miles (9.3 km) east of Akyab, Burma.
Petrel	United Kingdom	The ship was driven ashore at Pevensey Bay, Sussex. She was on a voyage from Palermo, Sicily to Hull, Yorkshire. She was refloated.

== 24 May ==
List of shipwrecks: 24 May 1848
Ship	State	Description
Berlin	United Kingdom	The ship was wrecked on Seal Island, Nova Scotia, British North America. Her crew were rescued. She was on a voyage from Saint John, New Brunswick, British North America to Liverpool, Lancashire.

== 25 May ==
List of shipwrecks: 25 May 1848
Ship	State	Description
Liberty	United Kingdom	The ship was driven ashore and sank in Clanyard Bay. She was on a voyage from East Loch Tarbert to the Water of Orr.

== 26 May ==
List of shipwrecks: 26 May 1848
Ship	State	Description
Commix	(United Kingdom of Great Britain and Ireland) British North America	The schooner was driven ashore and wrecked Saint John's, Newfoundland. Her crew were rescued. She was on a voyage from Placentia Bay to Saint John's.
Thetis	(United Kingdom of Great Britain and Ireland) New South Wales	The schooner was wrecked on Point Lonsdale with the loss of four lives. She was on a voyage from Sydney to Melbourne.

== 27 May ==
List of shipwrecks: 27 May 1848
Ship	State	Description
Diana	Hamburg	First Schleswig War: The ship was captured by a Royal Danish Navy cruiser whilst on a voyage from Middlesbrough, Yorkshire to Hamburg. She was sent in to Amrum, Duchy of Holstein but ran aground off that island. Subsequently refloated and sent to Copenhagen, Denmark.
Terry	United Kingdom	The brig, which had been struck by a whale on 16 May, was abandoned in the Atlantic Ocean. Her crew were rescued before she sank. She was on a voyage from Whitehaven, Cumberland to Saint John's, Newfoundland, British North America.

== 29 May ==
List of shipwrecks: 29 May 1848
Ship	State	Description
Agenoria	United Kingdom	The ship ran aground on the Scroby Sands, Norfolk. She was on a voyage from Newcastle upon Tyne, Northumberland to Jersey, Channel Islands. She was refloated the next day.
Commerce	United Kingdom	The barque was wrecked on Cape Negro, Nova Scotia, British North America with the loss of nine lives. She was on a voyage from Galway to Saint John, New Brunswick, British North America.

== 30 May ==
List of shipwrecks: 30 May 1848
Ship	State	Description
Diana	United States	The towboat ran aground in the Mississippi River and was run into by Eliza Pirrie, which she was towing.
Hope	(United Kingdom of Great Britain and Ireland) South Australia	The whaler, a brig, was wrecked in the Bay of Islands.
Sophia	(United Kingdom of Great Britain and Ireland) Van Diemen's Land	The ship ran aground and sank on a reef off Melbourne, New South Wales. Her crew were rescued. She was on a voyage from Launceston to Melbourne.

== 31 May ==
List of shipwrecks: 31 May 1848
Ship	State	Description
Alice Maria	(United Kingdom of Great Britain and Ireland) British North America	The schooner was wrecked on the Sugar Ledge, off Tor Bay, Nova Scotia. Her crew were rescued. She was on a voyage from Halifax to Pictou.
Sker	United Kingdom	The ship ran aground on the North Bank, in the Irish Sea. She was on a voyage from Wexford to Bangor. She was refloated and resumed her voyage.

== Unknown date ==
List of shipwrecks: Unknown date in May 1848
Ship	State	Description
Alida Jantina	Flag unknown	The ship was driven ashore on the Villez Maston Rocks. She was refloated on 6 May and taken in to Saint-Nazaire, Loire-Inférieure, France.
Arachne	(United Kingdom of Great Britain and Ireland) Van Diemen's Land	The whaler was wrecked off the west coast of New Holland. Her crew survived.
Declaration	United States	The brigantine was abandoned in the Atlantic Ocean. She was discovered derelict on 27 May by Pakenham (United Kingdom) and was set afire.
Desdemona	United Kingdom	The ship was driven ashore on the coast of Jutland. She was refloated and put in to Copenhagen, Denmark, where she arrived on 11 May.
Diamante	Belgium	The ship was lost in the Saint Lucia Channel.
Harley	United Kingdom	The brig was driven ashore at English Point, British North America before 22 May.
Harold	Hamburg	The schooner was wrecked on the African coast before 19 May. She was on a voyage from Hamburg to Sierra Leone.
Hector	Denmark	The brig was wrecked on the English Bank, in the Atlantic Ocean off the coast of Uruguay. Her crew were rescued. She was on a voyage from Hamburg to Montevideo, Uruguay.
H. Kinney	United States	The steamboat was destroyed by a boiler explosion in the Tombigbee River with some loss of life. She was on a voyage from Mobile, Alabama to Vienna, Alabama.
Louisville	United States	The ship was driven ashore and damaged at Cienfuegos, Cuba before 31 May. She was on a voyage from Cienfuegos to Trieste. She was refloated and taken in to Cienfuegos, where she was condemned.
Mountaineer	United States	The three-masted schooner was abandoned in the Atlantic Ocean before 23 May.
Narcissus	United Kingdom	The ship was driven ashore and wrecked at Ventava, Courland Governorate. Her crew were rescued. She was on a voyage from London to Ventspils.
Ulysses	France	The ship was driven ashore on Nova Scotia. She was on a voyage from Rochefort, Charente-Maritime to Saint Andrews, New Brunswick, British North America.
