= Coal Fire, Alabama =

Unincorporated community in Alabama, United States

- Unincorporated community
- Location within the state of Alabama
- Coordinates: 33°08′28″N 88°02′19″W
- Country: United States
- State: Alabama
- County: Pickens
- Elevation: 282 ft (86 m)
- Time zone: UTC-6 (Central (CST))
  - Summer (DST): UTC-5 (CDT)
- Area codes: 205, 659

Coal Fire, also known as Cold Fire, Coalfire, and Fundee, is an unincorporated community in Pickens County, Alabama, United States.

== History ==
The community was first known as Fundee, which was a portmanteau of two local family names, the Funderburks and the DeLoaches. It was then renamed for a local creek, which has been recorded as both Coal Fire and Cold Fire. A post office called Coal Fire was established in 1871, and remained in operation until being discontinued in 1927.
