= Benevola, Alabama =

Unincorporated community in Alabama, United States

- Unincorporated community
- Location within the State of Alabama
- Coordinates: 33°08′28″N 88°02′19″W
- Country: United States
- State: Alabama
- County: Pickens
- Elevation: 200 ft (61 m)
- Time zone: UTC-6 (Central (CST))
  - Summer (DST): UTC-5 (CDT)
- Area codes: 205, 659

Benevola is a small farming community in Pickens County, Alabama, United States. It is located along the Sipsey River.

== Geography ==
Benevola is located at 33°06′33″N 87°57′54″W and has an elevation of 200 feet (61 m).
