= Gordo High School =

Location
- 630 4th St NW; Gordo, Alabama 35466; United States; 33°19′29″N 87°54′23″W

Information
- School type: Public high school
- Founded: 1898 (128 years ago)
- School district: Pickens County School District
- Superintendent: Benjamin “Shawn” McDaniel
- CEEB code: 011255
- Principal: Jeff Campbell
- Teaching staff: 26.83 (FTE)
- Grades: 7–12
- Enrollment: 480 (2023-2024)
- Student to teacher ratio: 17.89
- Colors: Dark Green, Bright Gold & White
- Mascot: Greenwave
- Website: www.gordohigh.net

Gordo High School is a public secondary school located in Gordo, Alabama. The school was established in 1898.

== Location ==
Gordo High School is located in West Alabama in eastern Pickens County off of U.S Highway 82. The high school serves the residents of Gordo and its surrounding areas as well as some students from the Carrollton area for grades 7–12. The enrollment total for the 2008–2009 school year was 541 students. The School Motto is GREENWAVE, an acronym meaning: Guides Respectful, responsible, and productive students, Encourages Every learner, Nurtures the Well-being of All, and Values Each individual.

== Athletics ==
The Greenwave participate in football, baseball, wrestling, softball, and boys and girls basketball. In total, Gordo is an eight-time state champion. The football team garnered championships in 2A in 1968, 1980, and 2001 with a 3A championship in 1985. The baseball team won back-to-back 2A championships coming in 2002-03. The next baseball state championship came in 2011 in 3A. The most recent came in 2017 in 3A vs Piedmont High School.

== Band ==
The Grenadier Marching Band has won numerous awards and also hosts the annual West Alabama Marching Band Festival.
