= McShan, Alabama =

Unincorporated community in Alabama, United States

- Unincorporated community
- Location within the state of Alabama McShan, Alabama (the United States)
- Coordinates: 33.38095°N 88.14169°W
- Country: United States
- State: Alabama
- County: Pickens
- Elevation: 285 ft (87 m)
- Time zone: UTC-6 (Central (CST))
  - Summer (DST): UTC-5 (CDT)
- ZIP code: 35471
- Area codes: 205, 659

McShan is an unincorporated community in Pickens County, Alabama, United States. It was named to honor the McShan Lumber Company, which moved to the location in 1844.

== Geography ==
McShan is located at 33.38095°N 88.14169°W and has an elevation of 285 feet (87 m).
