= Olney, Alabama =

Unincorporated community in Alabama, United States

- Unincorporated community
- Location within the state of Alabama
- Coordinates: 33°8′28″N 88°2′19″W
- Country: United States
- State: Alabama
- County: Pickens
- Elevation: 322 ft (98 m)
- Time zone: UTC-6 (Central (CST))
  - Summer (DST): UTC-5 (CDT)
- Area codes: 205, 659
- GNIS feature ID: 156837-88.14169

Olney is an unincorporated community in Pickens County, Alabama, United States.

== Education ==
Olney was home to a now defunct educational institution called the Senaka Academy.
