= Macedonia, Alabama =

- Census-designated place
- Location in Pickens County and the state of Alabama
- Coordinates: 33°24′14″N 88°14′43″W
- Country: United States
- State: Alabama
- County: Pickens

Area
  - Total: 3.95 sq mi (10.23 km^{2})
  - Land: 3.95 sq mi (10.23 km^{2})
  - Water: 0 sq mi (0.00 km^{2})
- Elevation: 325 ft (99 m)

Population (2020)
  - Total: 241
  - Density: 61.0/sq mi (23.57/km^{2})
- Time zone: UTC-6 (Central (CST))
  - Summer (DST): UTC-5 (CDT)
- FIPS code: 01-45316
- GNIS feature ID: 2633142

Macedonia is a census-designated place and former town in Pickens County, Alabama, United States. As of the 2020 census, Macedonia had a population of 241. The town was incorporated in 1994, but disincorporated in 2001. It was reclassified as a census-designated place (CDP) for 2010. Its name is derived from the ancient Greek Kingdom of Macedonia.

== Geography ==
According to the United States Census Bureau, the town had a total area of 2.2 square miles (5.7 km^{2}), all land.

== Demographics ==
Historical population
Census	Pop.	Note	%±
2000	291		—
2010	292		0.3%
2020	241		−17.5%
U.S. Decennial Census

After disincorporation, Macedonia was relisted as a census designated place in the 2010 U.S. census.

=== 2020 census ===
Macedonia CDP, Alabama – Racial and ethnic composition Note: the US Census treats Hispanic/Latino as an ethnic category. This table excludes Latinos from the racial categories and assigns them to a separate category. Hispanics/Latinos may be of any race.
Race / Ethnicity (NH = Non-Hispanic)	Pop 2000	Pop 2010	Pop 2020	% 2000	% 2010	% 2020
White alone (NH)	19	26	25	6.53%	8.90%	10.37%
Black or African American alone (NH)	267	266	210	91.75%	91.10%	87.14%
Native American or Alaska Native alone (NH)	2	0	0	0.69%	0.00%	0.00%
Asian alone (NH)	0	0	1	0.00%	0.00%	0.41%
Native Hawaiian or Pacific Islander alone (NH)	0	0	0	0.00%	0.00%	0.00%
Other race alone (NH)	0	0	0	0.00%	0.00%	0.00%
Mixed race or Multiracial (NH)	3	0	3	1.03%	0.00%	1.24%
Hispanic or Latino (any race)	0	0	2	0.00%	0.00%	0.83%
Total	291	292	241	100.00%	100.00%	100.00%

As of the 2020 United States census, there were 241 people, 146 households, and 27 families residing in the CDP.

=== 2010 census ===
As of the 2010 United States census, there were 292 people living in the CDP. 91.1% were African American and 8.9% White.

=== 2000 census ===
As of the census of 2000, there were 291 people, 114 households, and 69 families living in the town. The population density was 131.4 inhabitants per square mile (50.7/km^{2}). There were 141 housing units at an average density of 63.7 per square mile (24.6/km^{2}). The racial makeup of the town was 6.53% White, 91.75% Black or African American, 0.69% Native American, and 1.03% from two or more races.

There were 114 households, out of which 30.7% had children under the age of 18 living with them, 32.5% were married couples living together, 21.1% had a female householder with no husband present, and 38.6% were non-families. 37.7% of all households were made up of individuals, and 16.7% had someone living alone who was 65 years of age or older. The average household size was 2.55 and the average family size was 3.44.

In the town the population was spread out, with 29.9% under the age of 18, 9.3% from 18 to 24, 27.5% from 25 to 44, 19.2% from 45 to 64, and 14.1% who were 65 years of age or older. The median age was 33 years. For every 100 females, there were 92.7 males. For every 100 females age 18 and over, there were 98.1 males.

The median income for a household in the town was $23,958, and the median income for a family was $29,688. Males had a median income of $26,042 versus $16,875 for females. The per capita income for the town was $9,456. About 30.6% of families and 33.3% of the population were below the poverty line, including 40.2% of those under the age of 18 and 58.8% of those 65 or over.
