= Dancy, Alabama =

Unincorporated community in Alabama, United States

- Unincorporated community
- Location within Alabama Location within the United States
- Coordinates: 33°00′40″N 88°17′34″W
- Country: United States
- State: Alabama
- County: Pickens
- Elevation: 194 ft (59 m)
- Time zone: UTC-6 (Central (CST))
  - Summer (DST): UTC-5 (CDT)
- Area codes: 205, 659
- GNIS feature ID: 117039

Dancy is an unincorporated community in Pickens County, Alabama, United States.

== History ==
Dancy is named for E. C. Dancy, who was a local physician. A post office operated under the name Dancy from 1892 to 1964.
