= Alabama State Route 159 =

State highway in Alabama, United States

State Route 159

Route information
- Maintained by ALDOT
- Length: 29.626 mi (47.678 km)

Major junctions
- South end: US 82 in Gordo
- North end: SR 171 in Fayette

Location
- Country: United States
- State: Alabama
- Counties: Fayette, Pickens

Highway system
- Alabama State Highway System; Interstate; US; State
← SR 158	→ SR 160

State Route 159 (SR 159) is a 29.626-mile (47.678 km) state highway that serves as a north–south connection between Gordo and Fayette through Fayette and Pickens counties. SR 159 intersects US 82 at its southern terminus and SR 171 at its northern terminus.

== Route description ==
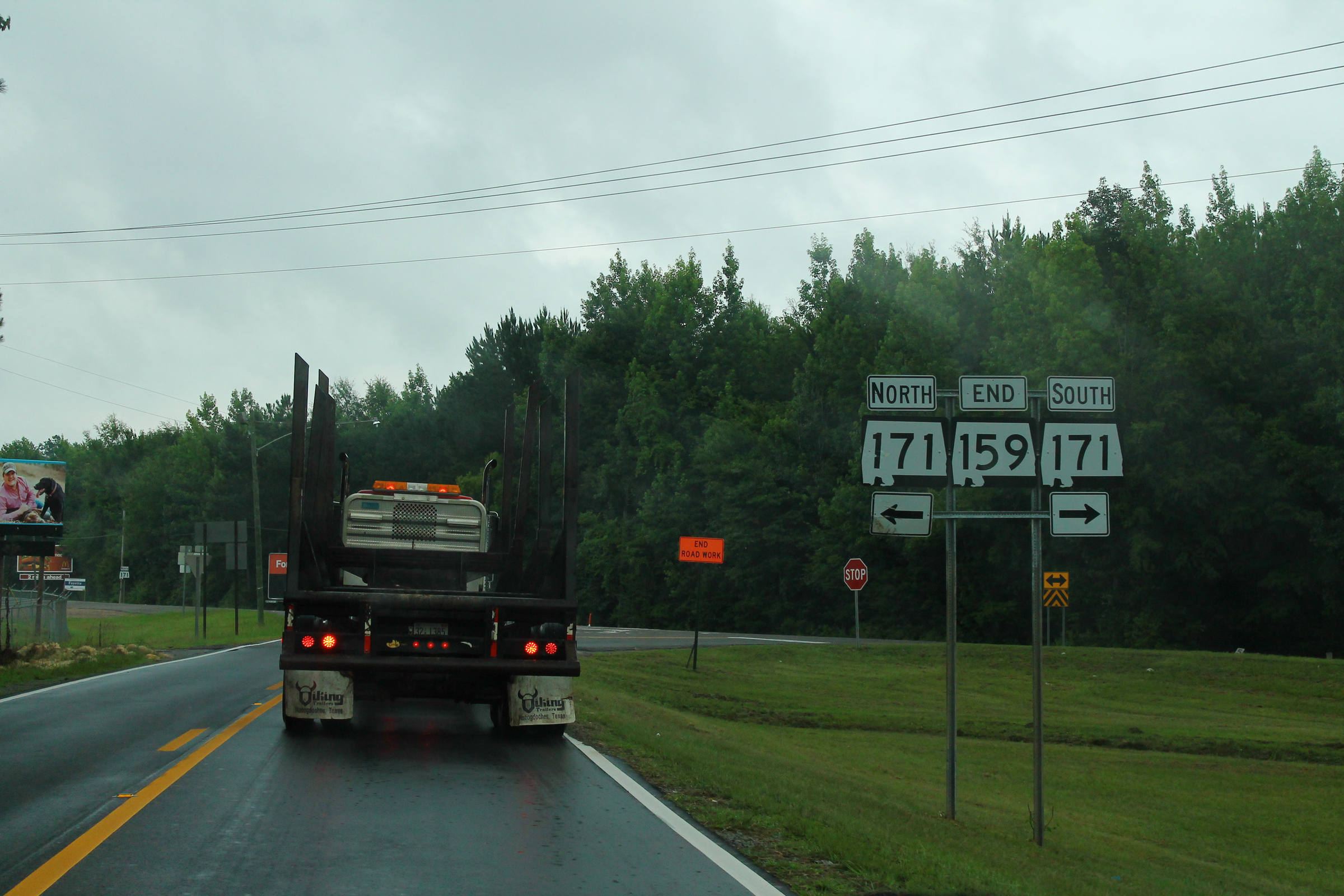
Northern terminus

SR 159 begins at an intersection with US 82 (internally designated as SR 6) in the central business district of Gordo. From this point, SR 159 follows a meandering northeasterly course through northern Pickens County and southern Fayette County en route to its northern terminus, an intersection with SR 171 in Fayette.

== Major intersections ==
County	Location	mi	km	Destinations	Notes
Pickens	Gordo	0.0	0.0	US 82 (SR 6) – Reform, Tuscaloosa	Southern terminus
Fayette	Fayette	29.626	47.678	SR 171 (Temple Avenue South) – Tuscaloosa, Winfield	Northern terminus
1.000 mi = 1.609 km; 1.000 km = 0.621 mi
