= Vienna, Alabama =

Unincorporated community in Alabama, United States

- Unincorporated community
- Location within the state of Alabama Vienna, Alabama (the United States)
- Coordinates: 33°01′07″N 88°11′31″W
- Country: United States
- State: Alabama
- County: Pickens
- Elevation: 141 ft (43 m)
- Time zone: UTC-6 (Central (CST))
  - Summer (DST): UTC-5 (CDT)
- Area codes: 205, 659
- GNIS feature ID: 157201

Vienna is an unincorporated community about 6 miles (10 kilometers) from Mississippi in Pickens County, Alabama, United States. It was a prosperous river port from the 1830s until the American Civil War, situated along the eastern shore of the Tombigbee River on the southwestern border of the county. It declined rapidly in importance with the building of a railroad through Pickens County following the war. In 1917 the post office closed and this marked the end of Vienna's official status as a town.

== Demographics ==
Historical population
| Census | Pop. | Note | %± |
|---|---|---|---|
| 1900 | 74 | | — |
| 1910 | 79 | | 6.8% |
U.S. Decennial Census

Vienna was listed as an incorporated community in the U.S. Censuses of 1900 and 1910. It disincorporated before 1920 and has not appeared on the census since.
