= Beards Mill, Alabama =

Unincorporated community in Alabama, United States

- Unincorporated community
- Location within Alabama Location within the United States
- Coordinates: 33°21′56″N 88°07′11″W
- Country: United States
- State: Alabama
- County: Pickens
- Elevation: 217 ft (66 m)
- Time zone: UTC-6 (Central (CST))
  - Summer (DST): UTC-5 (CDT)
- Area codes: 205, 659
- GNIS feature ID: 156040

Beards Mill, also known as Beard, is an unincorporated community in Pickens County, Alabama, United States.

== History ==
A post office operated under the name Beard from 1880 to 1898.
