= Gordo, Alabama =

- Town
- Flag Logo

- Location of Gordo in Pickens County, Alabama
- Coordinates: 33°19′19″N 87°54′15″W
- Country: United States
- State: Alabama
- County: Pickens

Area
  - Total: 3.26 sq mi (8.44 km^{2})
  - Land: 3.25 sq mi (8.42 km^{2})
  - Water: 0.0039 sq mi (0.01 km^{2})
- Elevation: 285 ft (87 m)

Population (2020)
  - Total: 1,628
  - Density: 496.2/sq mi (191.58/km^{2})
- Time zone: UTC−6 (Central (CST))
  - Summer (DST): UTC−5 (CDT)
- ZIP code: 35466
- Area code: 205, 659
- FIPS code: 01-30736
- GNIS feature ID: 2406590
- Website: www.townofgordo.org

Gordo is a town in Pickens County, Alabama, United States. At the 2020 census, its population was 1,628, down from 1,750 in 2010. It was the second-largest municipality in Pickens County as of 2020, after Aliceville. The town incorporated in 1900.

== History ==
A post office called Gordo has been in operation since 1847. The name of the town likely commemorates the 1847 Battle of Cerro Gordo in the Mexican–American War.

== Geography ==
The city is located in west central Alabama along U.S. Route 82, which runs northwest to southeast through the town. It leads southeast 22 mi (35 km) to Northport and 23 mi (37 km) to Tuscaloosa. It runs northwest 8 mi (13 km) to Reform and 37 mi (60 km) to Columbus, Mississippi. Alabama State Route 86 runs west 14 mi (23 km) to Carrollton, the Pickens county seat. Alabama State Route 159 runs north 31 mi (50 km) to Fayette.

According to the U.S. Census Bureau, the town has a total area of 3.2 square miles (8.3 km^{2}), of which 3.2 square miles (8.3 km^{2}) is land and 0.31% is water.

== Demographics ==
Historical population
| Census | Pop. | Note | %± |
|---|---|---|---|
| 1910 | 707 | | — |
| 1920 | 642 | | −9.2% |
| 1930 | 811 | | 26.3% |
| 1940 | 934 | | 15.2% |
| 1950 | 952 | | 1.9% |
| 1960 | 1,714 | | 80.0% |
| 1970 | 1,991 | | 16.2% |
| 1980 | 2,112 | | 6.1% |
| 1990 | 1,918 | | −9.2% |
| 2000 | 1,677 | | −12.6% |
| 2010 | 1,750 | | 4.4% |
| 2020 | 1,628 | | −7.0% |
U.S. Decennial Census

=== Racial and ethnic composition ===
Gordo town, Alabama – Racial and ethnic composition Note: the US Census treats Hispanic/Latino as an ethnic category. This table excludes Latinos from the racial categories and assigns them to a separate category. Hispanics/Latinos may be of any race. Race and ethnicity was not surveyed for populations under 2,500 in the 1980 census and under 1,000 in 1990 census.
| Race / Ethnicity (NH = Non-Hispanic) | Pop 1990 | Pop 2000 | Pop 2010 | Pop 2020 | % 1990 | % 2000 | % 2010 | % 2020 |
|---|---|---|---|---|---|---|---|---|
| White alone (NH) | 1,105 | 974 | 1,025 | 882 | 57.61% | 58.08% | 58.57% | 54.18% |
| Black or African American alone (NH) | 802 | 669 | 657 | 642 | 41.81% | 39.89% | 37.54% | 39.43% |
| Native American or Alaska Native alone (NH) | 0 | 3 | 4 | 3 | 0.00% | 0.18% | 0.23% | 0.18% |
| Asian alone (NH) | 4 | 0 | 3 | 6 | 0.21% | 0.00% | 0.17% | 0.37% |
| Native Hawaiian or Pacific Islander alone (NH) | x | 0 | 0 | 0 | x | 0.00% | 0.00% | 0.00% |
| Other race alone (NH) | 0 | 5 | 2 | 1 | 0.00% | 0.30% | 0.11% | 0.06% |
| Mixed race or Multiracial (NH) | x | 5 | 33 | 71 | x | 0.30% | 1.89% | 4.36% |
| Hispanic or Latino (any race) | 7 | 21 | 26 | 23 | 0.36% | 1.25% | 1.49% | 1.41% |
| Total | 1,918 | 1,677 | 1,750 | 1,628 | 100.00% | 100.00% | 100.00% | 100.00% |

=== 2020 census ===
As of the 2020 census, Gordo had a population of 1,628. The median age was 40.7 years. 24.6% of residents were under the age of 18 and 19.5% of residents were 65 years of age or older. For every 100 females there were 86.3 males, and for every 100 females age 18 and over there were 78.1 males age 18 and over.

0.0% of residents lived in urban areas, while 100.0% lived in rural areas.

There were 707 households in Gordo, of which 29.8% had children under the age of 18 living in them. Of all households, 35.1% were married-couple households, 20.8% were households with a male householder and no spouse or partner present, and 42.1% were households with a female householder and no spouse or partner present. About 40.3% of all households were made up of individuals and 17.1% had someone living alone who was 65 years of age or older.

There were 776 housing units, of which 8.9% were vacant. The homeowner vacancy rate was 0.7% and the rental vacancy rate was 6.6%.

=== 2010 census ===
As of the 2010 United States census, there were 1,750 people living in the town. 58.9% were White, 37.8% African American, 0.2% Native American, 0.2% Asian, 0.9% from some other race and 2.0% of two or more races, or were aliens. 1.5% were Hispanic or Latino of any race.

=== 2000 census ===
As of the 2000 census, there were 1,677 people, 728 households, and 474 families living in the town. The population density was 527.1 inhabitants per square mile (203.5/km^{2}). There were 810 housing units at an average density of 254.6 per square mile (98.3/km^{2}). The racial makeup of the town was 58.91% White, 40.31% Black or African American, 0.18% Native American, 0.30% from other races, and 0.30% from two or more races. 1.25% of the population were Hispanic or Latino of any race.

There were 728 households, out of which 27.9% had children under the age of 18 living with them, 45.3% were married couples living together, 17.6% had a female householder with no husband present, and 34.8% were non-families. 33.0% of all households were made up of individuals, and 17.7% had someone living alone who was 65 years of age or older. The average household size was 2.30 and the average family size was 2.92.

In the town, the age distribution of the population showed 24.2% under the age of 18, 8.8% from 18 to 24, 24.3% from 25 to 44, 23.9% from 45 to 64, and 18.8% who were 65 years of age or older. The median age was 41 years. For every 100 females, there were 82.5 males. For every 100 females age 18 and over, there were 77.0 males.

The median income for a household in the town was $23,813, and the median income for a family was $35,714. Males had a median income of $27,500 versus $21,029 for females. The per capita income for the town was $13,937. About 17.5% of families and 23.1% of the population were below the poverty line, including 32.4% of those under age 18 and 19.3% of those age 65 or over.

== Education ==
Education in Gordo is overseen and governed by the Pickens County Board of Education.

Students of Gordo and its surrounding areas are served by Gordo Elementary School and Gordo High School.

== Notable people ==
- Larry Blakeney, former Auburn quarterback and head coach at Troy University
- Charles W. Davis, World War II Medal of Honor recipient
- Wayne Davis, former NFL Linebacker
- Verdo Elmore, former Major League Baseball player for the St. Louis Browns

== Crime (Notable Events) ==
- Sean Worsley In 2016, disabled veteran Sean Worsley was arrested in Pickens County for possession of prescription medical marijuana by Police Officer Carl Abramo of the Gordo Police Department. Worsley was arrested after stopping at a gas station when Abramo allegedly heard loud music and "observed a black male get out of the passenger side vehicle". In 2020, Mr. Worsley was extradited from his home state in Arizona to Pickens County, where he was sentenced by a judge to 60 months in the custody of the Alabama Department of Corrections. After serving almost 10 months in Alabama jails for felony possession of medical marijuana legally prescribed in his home state of Arizona, the disabled Iraqi War veteran was released with a pardon.
