= Corridor X =

Corridor X may refer to:

- Corridor X (Appalachian Development Highway System), a part of Interstate 22 in the United States
- Pan-European Corridor X, a corridor that passes through Austria, Slovenia, Croatia, Serbia, Macedonia and Greece
