= Sapps, Alabama =

Unincorporated community in Alabama, United States

- Unincorporated community
- Location within Alabama Location within the United States
- Coordinates: 33°13′15″N 88°10′09″W
- Country: United States
- State: Alabama
- County: Pickens
- Elevation: 305 ft (93 m)
- Time zone: UTC-6 (Central (CST))
  - Summer (DST): UTC-5 (CDT)
- Area codes: 205, 659
- GNIS feature ID: 157017

Sapps is an unincorporated community in Pickens County, Alabama, United States.

== History ==
A post office operated under the name Sapps from 1893 to 1905.
