= Liberty, Pickens County, Alabama =

Unincorporated community in Alabama, United States

Liberty, Alabama
- Unincorporated community
- Location within Alabama Location within the United States
- Coordinates: 33°28′33.42″N 88°10′12.11″W
- Country: United States
- State: Alabama
- County: Pickens
- Elevation: 315 ft (96 m)
- Time zone: UTC-6 (Central (CST))
  - Summer (DST): UTC-5 (CDT)
- Area codes: 205, 659
- GNIS feature ID: 135559

Liberty is an unincorporated community in Pickens County, Alabama, United States.

Liberty was once home to Liberty High School, but the school closed in 1967.
