= Reform, Alabama =

City in Alabama, United States

Reform
- Town
- Location of Reform in Pickens County, Alabama
- Coordinates: 33°22′12″N 88°00′24″W
- Country: United States
- State: Alabama
- County: Pickens

Area
  - Total: 8.04 sq mi (20.82 km^{2})
  - Land: 8.01 sq mi (20.74 km^{2})
  - Water: 0.027 sq mi (0.07 km^{2})
- Elevation: 240 ft (73 m)

Population (2020)
  - Total: 1,520
  - Density: 189.8/sq mi (73.28/km^{2})
- Time zone: UTC-6 (Central (CST))
  - Summer (DST): UTC-5 (CDT)
- ZIP code: 35481
- Area codes: 205, 659
- FIPS code: 01-64104
- GNIS feature ID: 2407194
- Website: www.cityofreform.com

Reform (/ˈriːfɔːrm/; REE-form) is a town in Pickens County, Alabama, United States. At the 2010 census the population was 1,702, down from 1,978 in 2000. It is located approximately halfway between Columbus, Mississippi and Tuscaloosa on U.S. Route 82.

== History ==
Sparsely settled after statehood, Reform first received a post office in 1841. It wasn't incorporated until March 2, 1898, following the community getting train service via the Mobile and Ohio Railroad. According to tradition, the community was named from an incident when an evangelist paid the new settlement a visit, imploring the first settlers to "reform".

On January 24, 1940, Reform set the record for the highest recorded snow depth for Alabama at 22 inches (55.9 cm).

In May 1968, a mule train, part of the Southern Christian Leadership Conference sponsored Poor People's Campaign, stopped for two days in Reform before heading to Tuscaloosa, Alabama on its way to Washington, DC.

On August 31, 2017, the area was hit by an EF2 tornado. The tornado touched down near Reform and tracked through Pickens, Lamar, and Fayette counties. Significant damage was also caused in the nearby community of Palmetto.

== Geography ==
The city is located in west central Alabama at the intersection of U.S. Route 82 and Alabama State Route 17. US 82 runs northwest to southeast through the city, leading southeast 8 mi (13 km) to Gordo and 31 mi (50 km) to Tuscaloosa, the largest city of over 100,000 people closest to the area. Columbus, Mississippi is 29 mi (47 km) to the northwest. AL 17 runs north to south, leading north 19 mi (31 km) to Millport and south 10 mi (16 km) to Carrollton, the Pickens County seat.

According to the U.S. Census Bureau, the city has a total area of 8.1 square miles (21 km^{2}), of which 8.0 square miles (21 km^{2}) is land and 0.04 square miles (0.10 km^{2}) (0.37%) is water.

== Demographics ==
Historical population
Census	Pop.	Note	%±
1900	198		—
1910	550		177.8%
1920	1,069		94.4%
1930	898		−16.0%
1940	885		−1.4%
1950	1,141		28.9%
1960	1,241		8.8%
1970	1,893		52.5%
1980	2,245		18.6%
1990	2,105		−6.2%
2000	1,978		−6.0%
2010	1,702		−14.0%
2020	1,520		−10.7%
U.S. Decennial Census; 2013 Estimate

Reform was listed as a city in the 2000 U.S. census and as a town in the 2010 U.S. census.

=== Racial and ethnic composition ===
Reform town, Alabama – Racial and ethnic composition Note: the US Census treats Hispanic/Latino as an ethnic category. This table excludes Latinos from the racial categories and assigns them to a separate category. Hispanics/Latinos may be of any race.
Race / Ethnicity (NH = Non-Hispanic)	Pop 2000	Pop 2010	Pop 2020	% 2000	% 2010	% 2020
White alone (NH)	1,054	858	651	53.29%	50.41%	42.83%
Black or African American alone (NH)	887	816	782	44.84%	47.94%	51.45%
Native American or Alaska Native alone (NH)	6	2	0	0.30%	0.12%	0.00%
Asian alone (NH)	0	0	0	0.00%	0.00%	0.00%
Native Hawaiian or Pacific Islander alone (NH)	0	0	0	0.00%	0.00%	0.00%
Other race alone (NH)	0	0	0	0.00%	0.00%	0.00%
Mixed race or Multiracial (NH)	24	11	54	1.21%	0.65%	3.55%
Hispanic or Latino (any race)	7	15	33	0.35%	0.88%	2.17%
Total	1,978	1,702	1,520	100.00%	100.00%	100.00%

=== 2020 census ===
As of the 2020 United States census, there were 1,520 people, 696 households, and 475 families residing in the town.

=== 2010 census ===
As of the 2010 United States census, there were 1,702 people living in the town. 50.6% were White, 48.2% African American, 0.1% Native American, 0.4% from some other race and 0.7% of two or more races. 0.9% were Hispanic or Latino of any race.

=== 2000 census ===
As of the census of 2000, there were 1,978 people, 793 households, and 521 families living in the city. The population density was 245.9 inhabitants per square mile (94.9/km^{2}). There were 925 housing units at an average density of 115.0 per square mile (44.4/km^{2}). The racial makeup of the city was 53.34% White, 44.89% Black or African American, 0.30% Native American, 0.05% from other races, and 1.42% from two or more races. 0.35% of the population were Hispanic or Latino of any race.

There were 793 households, out of which 31.7% had children under the age of 18 living with them, 39.1% were married couples living together, 22.7% had a female householder with no husband present, and 34.3% were non-families. 33.0% of all households were made up of individuals, and 16.6% had someone living alone who was 65 years of age or older. The average household size was 2.40 and the average family size was 3.06.

In the city, the population was spread out, with 28.0% under the age of 18, 7.3% from 18 to 24, 24.7% from 25 to 44, 20.4% from 45 to 64, and 19.7% who were 65 years of age or older. The median age was 37 years. For every 100 females, there were 76.1 males. For every 100 females age 18 and over, there were 68.7 males.

The median income for a household in the city was $20,625, and the median income for a family was $24,875. Males had a median income of $27,019 versus $16,827 for females. The per capita income for the city was $11,429. About 26.3% of families and 30.0% of the population were below the poverty line, including 38.9% of those under age 18 and 26.6% of those age 65 or over.

== Education ==
Education in Reform is overseen and governed by the Pickens County Board of Education. Students of Reform and its surrounding areas are served by Reform Elementary School and Pickens County High School.

== Notable people ==
- Tony Dixon, safety for the Dallas Cowboys
- Doug Elmore, punter for the Washington Redskins
- Andrew F. Fox, Member of US House of Representatives
- James L. Malone, head football coach at Northeast Louisiana State College, 1951–1953
- John Proctor, FBI agent instrumental in solving the 1964 case for the murders of Chaney, Goodman, and Schwerner
- Michael Williams, NFL tight end for the New England Patriots
