= Pickens County School District (Alabama) =

School district in Alabama, United States

Address
- 377 Ladow Center Circle Carrollton, Alabama, 35447; United States

District information
- Type: Public
- Grades: PreK–12
- NCES District ID: 0102730

Students and staff
- Students: 2,374
- Teachers: 136.0
- Staff: 162.67
- Student–teacher ratio: 17.46

Other information
- Website: www.pickenscountyschools.net

Pickens County School District is a school district in Pickens County, Alabama.

It is the sole school district in the county.

Statewide testing ranks the schools in Alabama. Those in the bottom six percent are listed as "failing." As of early 2018, Aliceville High School was included in this category.

== Schools ==
Middle and high schools

- Aliceville High School (grades 7–12)
- Gordo High School (grades 7–12)
- Pickens County High School (grades 5–12)

Elementary schools

- Aliceville Elementary School (PK-6)
- Gordo Elementary School (PK-6)
- Reform Elementary School (PK-4)

Other

- Pickens County College and Career Center
