= Pickens County, Alabama =

County in Alabama, United States

- County
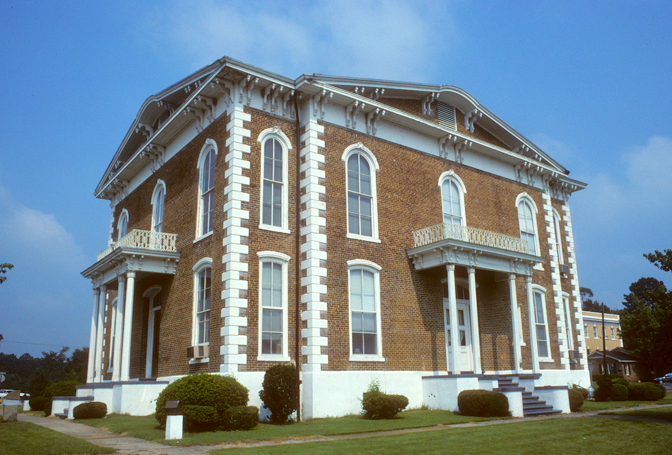
- Pickens County Courthouse in Carrollton

- Logo

- Location within the U.S. state of Alabama
- Coordinates: 33°16′43″N 88°05′35″W
- Country: United States
- State: Alabama
- Founded: December 20, 1820
- Named for: Andrew Pickens
- Seat: Carrollton
- Largest city: Aliceville

Area
  - Total: 890 sq mi (2,300 km^{2})
  - Land: 881 sq mi (2,280 km^{2})
  - Water: 8.7 sq mi (23 km^{2}) 1.0%

Population (2020)
  - Total: 19,123
  - Estimate (2025): 18,221 ▼
  - Density: 21.7/sq mi (8.38/km^{2})
- Time zone: UTC−6 (Central)
  - Summer (DST): UTC−5 (CDT)
- Congressional district: 7th
- Website: www.pickenscountyal.com
- County Number 54 on Alabama Licence Plates

Pickens County is a county located on the west central border of the U.S. state of Alabama. As of the 2020 census, the population was 19,123. Its county seat is Carrollton, located in the center of the county. It is a prohibition, or dry county, although the communities of Carrollton and Aliceville voted to become wet in 2011 and 2012, respectively.

Pickens County is included in the Tuscaloosa, Alabama metropolitan area

== History ==
Like the rest of Alabama, this had long been occupied by Native Americans; historically the Muscogee people (Creek) dominated this area. Pickens County was established on the western border of Alabama on December 20, 1820, and named for revolutionary war hero General Andrew Pickens of South Carolina. The county seat was relocated from Pickensville to Carrollton in 1830.

Less than one-third of the county was developed for cotton plantations, which were worked by enslaved African-Americans brought south by northern businessmen interested in cheap cotton. These plantations were developed primarily in the southernmost reaches of the county, in the lowlands along the banks of the Tombigbee River and stretching over a small prairie-like area. The rest of the county was settled by yeomen farmers who held few slaves; it was topographically unsuited for plantation-scale farming operations.

During the American Civil War, the first courthouse in Carrollton was burned on April 5, 1865, by troops of Union General John T. Croxton. Recovering from that and other damage was part of the postwar work for the county.

A second courthouse was built in Carrollton. It was destroyed by fire on November 16, 1876, during the last months of the Reconstruction era. Though arson was suspected, no arrest was made until January 1878, after white Democrats had regained control of the state legislature and the county sheriff's office. White racial hostility toward African Americans in the county, and their efforts to retain dominance, resulted in numerous lynchings.

According to the third edition of Lynching in America, a study of lynchings of African Americans in the United States, the county had 14 documented lynchings of African Americans in Pickens County from 1877 to 1917; this is the fifth-highest total in the state. This was the period of Jim Crow and disenfranchisement of blacks throughout Alabama and the South.

Henry Wells, an African American, was arrested in January 1878 as a suspect in the courthouse arson and a burglary. He was captured in an arrest for the burglary, in which he was shot and wounded. Reportedly confessing to the courthouse arson (likely under coercion), he died five days later of his wounds. A myth associated his death with another lynching of an African-American man in this period, and an image, purportedly of Wells' face in a courthouse window. But while numerous African Americans were lynched in the courthouse square, the windows in the courthouse were not installed until February and March 1878.

In the late 19th century, there was strong hostility in Pickens County among yeomen whites against freedmen, and they committed numerous lynchings into the early 20th century. The county was a populist stronghold in the 1890s and many voters had joined the Farmers Alliance. Agricultural commissioner and populist choice Reuben F. Kolb was defeated in 1890 for the Democratic nomination for governor by Thomas G. Jones, chosen by delegates who joined to defeat Kolb. In 1892 both ran again, Kolb representing Jeffersonian Democrats, and Kolb the main Democratic Party. Kolb won in Pickens County by "an immense majority". Governor Jones was re-elected, in part because of his reliance on a platform of white supremacy, to appeal to whites alarmed by Kolb's promising to protect African-American rights. But Jones supported reform, opposing the convict lease system that trapped so many African Americans in near-slavery conditions.

Electoral unrest and populist furor in the county may have contributed to six lynchings in Carrollton in the fall of 1893. On September 14, 1893, African-American suspects Paul Archer, Will Archer, Emma Fair, Ed Guyton, and Paul Hill, were each shot to death in a mass lynching by a white mob at the courthouse jail. They had been arrested when accused of burning a mill and cotton gin owned by a white man. Their lynchings followed that of Joe Floyd, another African-American worker, two weeks before.

On August 28, 1907, African-American John Gibson was lynched in Carrollton, hanged to death in the courthouse square. John Lipsep was hanged and shot in early September 1907, a suspect in an attack on a white woman.

=== 20th century to present ===
From 1940 to 1970, many African Americans left Pickens County to escape racial violence and oppression in the Great Migration to urban areas, as did other rural residents, because of lack of economic opportunity.

On April 8, 1998, a supercell thunderstorm produced an F3 tornado in Pickens County. This windstorm injured two people and damaged five homes including mobile homes. It rotated seventeen miles (27 km) from Holman to north of Northport. Twenty-four homes and thirteen mobile homes were also in the path of destruction. Moments later, that same supercell thunderstorm produced an F5 tornado that struck northeastern Tuscaloosa near the Black Warrior River before entering western Jefferson County where it destroyed Oak Grove High School and killed thirty-two people in its path.

From 2000 to 2013 the county was again losing population. From July 2013 to July 2014, the population grew by 5.1%, making it the fourth-fastest growing county with at least 10,000 inhabitants. In 2014 it became the fastest-growing county in Alabama. But part of the growth was the result of the construction here of the Federal Correctional Institution, Aliceville federal women's prison. Prisoners are included in local census numbers, as are prison employees, some of whom came from other counties.

In 2016, Black disabled veteran Sean Worsley was arrested in Pickens County for possession of prescription medical marijuana by Police Officer Carl Abramo of the Gordo Police Department. Worsley was arrested after stopping at a gas station when Abramo allegedly heard loud music and "observed a black male get out of the passenger side vehicle". In 2020, Mr. Worsley was extradited from his home state in Arizona to Pickens County, where he was sentenced by a judge to 60 months in the custody of the Alabama Department of Corrections.

In 2019, Sheriff David Abston resigned as part of a plea deal with federal officials. He pleaded guilty to scamming a local food bank and his own church for food to feed county prisoners. He then was able to pocket the savings. Abston had served in the office for more than thirty years.

== Geography ==
According to the United States Census Bureau, the county has a total area of 890 square miles (2,300 km^{2}), of which 881 square miles (2,280 km^{2}) is land and 8.7 square miles (23 km^{2}) (1.0%) is water.

The county is between Tuscaloosa County and the Alabama-Mississippi state line.

=== Adjacent counties ===
- Lamar County (north)
- Fayette County (northeast)
- Tuscaloosa County (east)
- Greene County (southeast)
- Sumter County (south)
- Noxubee County, Mississippi (southwest)
- Lowndes County, Mississippi (west)

== Transportation ==
=== Major highways ===
- U.S. Highway 82 / State Route 6 (unsigned)
- State Route 14
- State Route 17
- State Route 32
- State Route 86
- State Route 159

=== Rail ===
- Alabama and Gulf Coast Railway
- Alabama Southern Railroad

== Demographics ==
Historical population
Census	Pop.	Note	%±
1830	6,622		—
1840	17,118		158.5%
1850	21,512		25.7%
1860	22,316		3.7%
1870	17,690		−20.7%
1880	21,479		21.4%
1890	22,470		4.6%
1900	24,402		8.6%
1910	25,055		2.7%
1920	25,353		1.2%
1930	24,902		−1.8%
1940	27,671		11.1%
1950	24,349		−12.0%
1960	21,882		−10.1%
1970	20,326		−7.1%
1980	21,481		5.7%
1990	20,699		−3.6%
2000	20,949		1.2%
2010	19,746		−5.7%
2020	19,123		−3.2%
2025 (est.)	18,221	▼	−4.7%
U.S. Decennial Census; 1790–1960 1900–1990; 1990–2000 2010–2020

=== 2020 census ===
As of the 2020 census, the county had a population of 19,123. The median age was 43.5 years. 19.2% of residents were under the age of 18 and 19.9% of residents were 65 years of age or older. For every 100 females there were 81.2 males, and for every 100 females age 18 and over there were 75.5 males age 18 and over.

The racial makeup of the county was 56.2% White, 39.2% Black or African American, 0.1% American Indian and Alaska Native, 0.4% Asian, 0.0% Native Hawaiian and Pacific Islander, 1.5% from some other race, and 2.6% from two or more races. Hispanic or Latino residents of any race comprised 5.5% of the population.

0.0% of residents lived in urban areas, while 100.0% lived in rural areas.

There were 7,437 households in the county, of which 28.2% had children under the age of 18 living with them and 34.9% had a female householder with no spouse or partner present. About 32.7% of all households were made up of individuals and 15.4% had someone living alone who was 65 years of age or older.

There were 8,646 housing units, of which 14.0% were vacant. Among occupied housing units, 74.5% were owner-occupied and 25.5% were renter-occupied. The homeowner vacancy rate was 1.2% and the rental vacancy rate was 6.7%.

=== Racial and ethnic composition ===
Pickens County, Alabama – Racial and ethnic composition Note: the US Census treats Hispanic/Latino as an ethnic category. This table excludes Latinos from the racial categories and assigns them to a separate category. Hispanics/Latinos may be of any race.
Race / Ethnicity (NH = Non-Hispanic)	Pop 2000	Pop 2010	Pop 2020	% 2000	% 2010	% 2020
White alone (NH)	11,676	11,027	10,066	55.74%	55.84%	52.64%
Black or African American alone (NH)	8,940	8,169	7,448	42.68%	41.37%	38.95%
Native American or Alaska Native alone (NH)	24	28	23	0.11%	0.14%	0.12%
Asian alone (NH)	22	32	78	0.11%	0.16%	0.41%
Pacific Islander alone (NH)	5	1	0	0.02%	0.01%	0.00%
Other race alone (NH)	17	18	12	0.08%	0.09%	0.06%
Mixed race or Multiracial (NH)	118	158	443	0.56%	0.80%	2.32%
Hispanic or Latino (any race)	147	313	1,053	0.70%	1.59%	5.51%
Total	20,949	19,746	19,123	100.00%	100.00%	100.00%

=== 2010 census ===
As of the 2010 United States census, there were 19,746 people in the county. 56.3% were White, 41.6% Black or African American, 0.2% Asian, 0.1% Native American, 0.6% of some other race and 1.2% of two or more races. 1.6% were Hispanic or Latino (of any race).

=== 2000 census ===
As of the census of 2000, there were 20,949 people, 8,086 households, and 5,789 families residing in the county. The population density was 24 people per square mile (9.3 people/km^{2}). There were 9,520 housing units at an average density of 11 units per square mile (4.2 units/km^{2}). The racial makeup of the county was 55.95% White, 42.96% Black or African American, 0.12% Native American, 0.11% Asian, 0.02% Pacific Islander, 0.22% from other races, and 0.63% from two or more races. About 0.70% of the population were Hispanic or Latino.

There were 8,086 households, out of which 32.60% had children under the age of 18 living with them, 49.80% were married couples living together, 18.20% had a female householder with no husband present, and 28.40% were non-families. Nearly 26.40% of all households were made up of individuals, and 12.50% had someone living alone who was 65 years of age or older. The average household size was 2.56, and the average family size was 3.11.

In the county, the population was spread out, with 27.30% under the age of 18, 8.50% from 18 to 24, 25.80% from 25 to 44, 22.80% from 45 to 64, and 15.70% who were 65 years of age or older. The median age was 37 years. For every 100 females, there were 88.10 males. For every 100 females age 18 and over, there were 83.30 males.

The median income for a household in the county was $26,254, and the median income for a family was $32,938. Males had a median income of $28,843 versus $20,569 for females. The per capita income for the county was $13,746. About 20.10% of families and 24.90% of the population were below the poverty line, including 34.30% of those under age 18 and 22.30% of those age 65 or over.

== Politics ==
Pickens County is a Republican leaning county. The last Democrat to win the county was Bill Clinton in 1996.

United States presidential election results for Pickens County, Alabama
Year	Republican		Democratic		Third party(ies)	
Year	No.	%	No.	%	No.	%
1904	105	9.89%	866	81.54%	91	8.57%
1908	69	7.22%	816	85.36%	71	7.43%
1912	22	2.38%	815	88.01%	89	9.61%
1916	218	15.36%	1,179	83.09%	22	1.55%
1920	263	15.45%	1,419	83.37%	20	1.18%
1924	132	11.05%	1,045	87.45%	18	1.51%
1928	634	38.15%	1,028	61.85%	0	0.00%
1932	128	7.54%	1,479	87.10%	91	5.36%
1936	107	6.01%	1,665	93.49%	9	0.51%
1940	140	7.51%	1,714	92.00%	9	0.48%
1944	209	12.30%	1,482	87.23%	8	0.47%
1948	91	5.97%	0	0.00%	1,433	94.03%
1952	905	37.06%	1,519	62.20%	18	0.74%
1956	993	35.16%	1,660	58.78%	171	6.06%
1960	1,277	40.46%	1,836	58.17%	43	1.36%
1964	3,416	82.08%	0	0.00%	746	17.92%
1968	321	5.07%	1,434	22.66%	4,573	72.27%
1972	4,071	67.33%	1,933	31.97%	42	0.69%
1976	2,969	43.75%	3,776	55.64%	41	0.60%
1980	3,582	43.78%	4,504	55.05%	96	1.17%
1984	4,685	56.47%	3,586	43.23%	25	0.30%
1988	3,851	55.16%	3,107	44.50%	24	0.34%
1992	3,634	44.63%	3,783	46.46%	725	8.90%
1996	3,322	42.74%	4,018	51.69%	433	5.57%
2000	4,306	50.42%	4,143	48.51%	91	1.07%
2004	5,170	56.61%	3,915	42.87%	47	0.51%
2008	5,434	53.98%	4,594	45.63%	39	0.39%
2012	5,124	53.26%	4,455	46.30%	42	0.44%
2016	5,456	57.18%	3,972	41.63%	114	1.19%
2020	5,594	57.86%	4,022	41.60%	52	0.54%
2024	5,465	61.32%	3,388	38.02%	59	0.66%

United States Senate election results for Pickens County, Alabama2
Year	Republican		Democratic		Third party(ies)	
Year	No.	%	No.	%	No.	%
2020	5,439	56.40%	4,193	43.48%	11	0.11%

United States Senate election results for Pickens County, Alabama3
Year	Republican		Democratic		Third party(ies)	
Year	No.	%	No.	%	No.	%
2022	4,225	64.30%	2,248	34.21%	98	1.49%

Alabama Gubernatorial election results for Pickens County
Year	Republican		Democratic		Third party(ies)	
Year	No.	%	No.	%	No.	%
2022	4,212	63.73%	2,249	34.03%	148	2.24%

== Communities ==
=== Cities ===
- Aliceville
- Reform

=== Towns ===
- Carrollton (county seat)
- Ethelsville
- Gordo
- McMullen
- Memphis
- Pickensville

=== Census-designated places ===
- Macedonia

=== Unincorporated communities ===
- Beards Mill
- Benevola
- Coal Fire
- Cochrane
- Dancy
- Liberty
- Lubbub
- McShan
- Olney
- Palmetto
- Sapps
- Vienna
- Zion

== Education ==
There is one school district in the county, Pickens County School District.

== See also ==
- National Register of Historic Places listings in Pickens County, Alabama
- Properties on the Alabama Register of Landmarks and Heritage in Pickens County, Alabama
