= Arkansas Highway 2 =

Former state highway in Arkansas

State Road 2

Route information
- Maintained by AHD
- Length: 195 mi (314 km)
- Existed: 1926–July 1, 1931

Major junctions
- West end: US 67 in Texarkana
- AR 3 in Magnolia; US 167 in El Dorado; US 165 in Montrose; US 65 in Lake Village
- East end: MS 10 at the Mississippi River

Location
- Country: United States
- State: Arkansas
- Counties: Ashley, Chicot, Columbia, Lafayette, Miller, Union

Highway system
- Arkansas Highway System; Interstate; US; State; Business; Spurs; Suffixed; Scenic; Heritage
← AR 1	→ AR 3

State Road 2 (AR 2, Ark. 2, and Hwy. 2) is a former east–west state highway in the Arkansas Timberlands and Lower Arkansas Delta. The route was approximately 195 miles (314 km), and ran from US Route 67 (US 67) in Texarkana east to cross the Mississippi River near Lake Village, continuing as Mississippi Highway 10. On July 1, 1931, the route was entirely replaced by US Highway 82 (US 82) by the American Association of State Highway Officials (AASHTO). The route was maintained by the Arkansas Highway Department (AHD), now known as the Arkansas Department of Transportation (ArDOT).

Except near cities, the current US 82 closely follows the original 1926 routing. One section of State Road 2 original pavement, known as the Old Arkansas 2-Mayton Segment, survives north of Garland. It was listed on the National Register of Historic Places on May 16, 2008.

== Route description ==
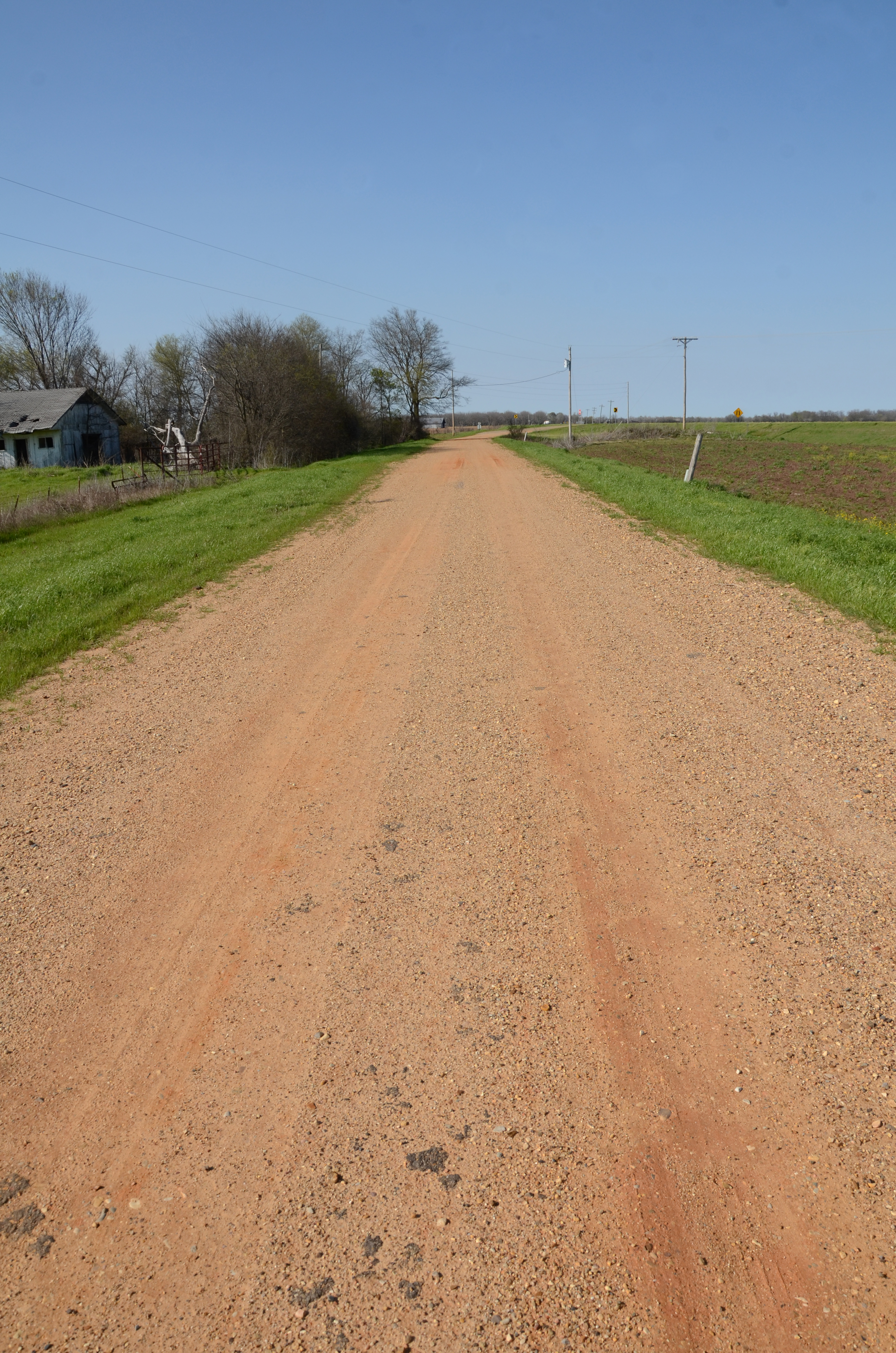
Old Arkansas 2, Mayton Segment

The route served the southern tier of counties in Arkansas, connecting several cities of regional importance. State Road 2 connected six county seats and included three toll bridges. State Road 2 also provided an important connection between the Arkansas Timberlands, approximately the western half of its Arkansas alignment, and the Arkansas Delta on the eastern half of the state.

== History ==
Several bypasses have been built since the original 1926 routing following the growth of the cities it passes through.

- Garland was bypassed in the 1980s by a new bridge over the Red River; the western part of old Highway 2 (from modern U.S. 82 into Garland) is now Highway 134.
- North of Garland, an S-shaped section of the highway was replaced with a new alignment in 1948, smoothing out the sharp curves. The old alignment, now part of County Roads 122 and 123, and one of the drivable sections of AR 2's original pavement, was listed on the National Register of Historic Places as "Old Arkansas 2-Mayton Segment" in 2008.
- East of Lake Village, U.S. 82 (Highway 2) turned northeast along Lake Chicot to the old ferry crossing near Greenville, Mississippi; that alignment is now Highway 144 from Lake Village past Lake Chicot State Park to its end at the Mississippi River levee. U.S. 82 was rerouted south of Lake Chicot when the Benjamin G. Humphreys Bridge opened in 1940, and retained most of that alignment for the current Greenville Bridge.

== Major intersections ==
County	Location	mi	km	Destinations	Notes
Miller	Texarkana	0.0	0.0	US 67	Western terminus
Miller	Garland City	22.0	35.4	AR 134 south	intersection at a toll bridge
Lafayette	Lewisville	32.5	52.3	AR 29	
Columbia	Waldo	45.4	73.1	AR 19 north	
Columbia	Magnolia	52.9	85.1	AR 3 / AR 19 south / AR 132 west	
Union		70.9	114.1	AR 57 north	
Union	El Dorado	88.6	142.6	US 167 north / AR 15 north	
Union	El Dorado	90.9	146.3	US 167 south	
Union	Strong	107.1	172.4	AR 129 south	
Ouachita River		122.1	196.5	Toll bridge	
Ashley	Crossett	129.5	208.4	AR 133 south	
Ashley	Hamburg	142.4	229.2	AR 13	
Ashley	Montrose	164.1	264.1	US 165	
Chicot	Lake Village	176.6	284.2	US 65	
Mississippi River		195	314	Ferry to MS 10	
1.000 mi = 1.609 km; 1.000 km = 0.621 mi

== See also ==
- Red River Bridge (Arkansas)
- National Register of Historic Places listings in Miller County, Arkansas
