= Luna, Arkansas =

- Unincorporated community
- Location within Arkansas Location within the United States
- Coordinates: 33°22′59″N 91°12′18″W
- Country: United States
- State: Arkansas
- County: Chicot
- Elevation: 128 ft (39 m)
- Time zone: UTC-6 (Central (CST))
  - Summer (DST): UTC-5 (CDT)
- Area code: 870
- GNIS feature ID: 58100

Luna is an unincorporated community in eastern Chicot County, Arkansas, United States. The community sits between the Mississippi River to the northeast and Lake Chicot to the southwest. Lake Chicot State Park lies to the south. Luna is located on Arkansas Highway 144, 5.75 miles (9.25 km) northeast of Lake Village.
