= Arkansas Highway 144 =

Designation for two state highways in Southeast Arkansas

Highway 144
- Segments of Highway 144 in red

Route information
- Maintained by ArDOT
- Existed: c. January 1, 1932–present

Section 1
- Length: 4.16 mi (6.69 km)
- West end: Big Bayou Meto Use Area
- East end: US 165 / AR 1 / Great River Road

Section 2
- Length: 20.50 mi (32.99 km)
- West end: US 165 near Jerome
- East end: Mississippi River levee

Location
- Country: United States
- State: Arkansas
- Counties: Jefferson, Arkansas, Ashley, Chicot

Highway system
- Arkansas Highway System; Interstate; US; State; Business; Spurs; Suffixed; Scenic; Heritage
← AR 143	→ AR 145

Highway 144 (AR 144, Ark. 144, and Hwy. 144) is a designation for two state highways in Southeast Arkansas. One route of 7.82 miles (12.59 km) begins at Big Bayou Meto Use Area and runs east to US Highway 165 (US 165), Highway 1, and the Great River Road (GRR). A second route of 20.50 miles (32.99 km) begins at US 165 near Jerome and runs east through Lake Village to a levee near the Mississippi River. Both routes are maintained by the Arkansas Department of Transportation (ArDOT). While overlapping US 65/US 278 in Chicot County, the route is part of the Great River Road, a national scenic byway following the Mississippi River.

== Route description ==
=== Bayou Meto ===
Highway 144 begins at Big Bayou Meto Use Area at the mouth of Bayou Meto at the Arkansas River in southeastern Jefferson County. It crosses the Bayou Meto into Arkansas County. The route runs east through agricultural land, becoming a section line road shortly before terminating at US 165/AR 1/GRR south of Gillett. As of 2016, the route had an annual average daily traffic (AADT) of 340 vehicles per day (VPD).

=== Lake Village ===
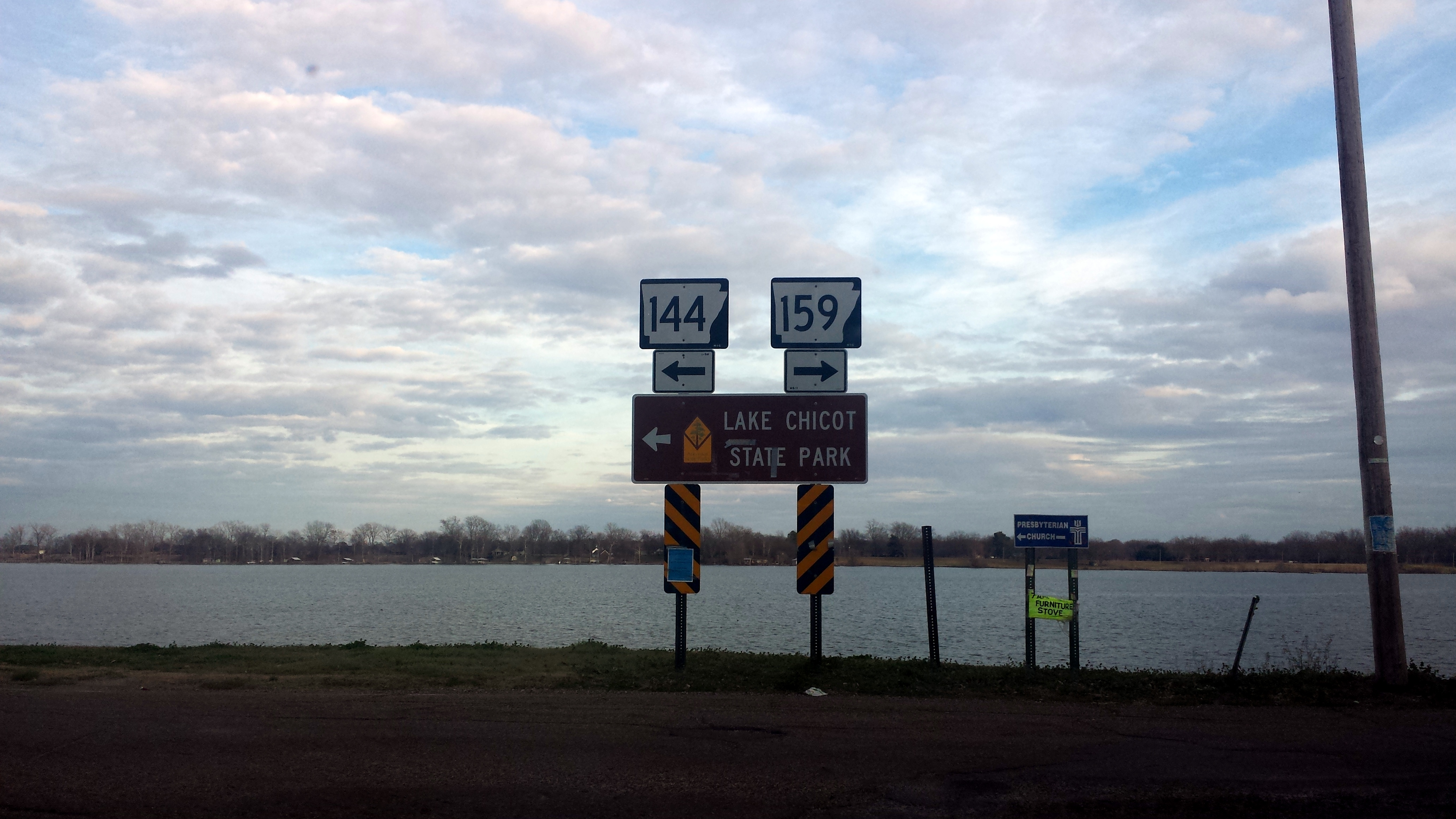
Highway 144 intersects Highway 159 and turns left at Lake Chicot

Highway 144 begins at US 165 near Jerome on the county line between Ashley and Drew County, where it runs east as a section line road into Chicot County. The route crosses flat agriculture and aquaculture operations, intersecting Highway 293 in western Chicot County. Highway 144 intersects US 65/US 278/GRR at McMillan Corner, and a concurrency begins southbound. US 65/US 278/AR 144 run south into Lake Village, the county seat of Chicot County. Highway 144 breaks east from the concurrency toward downtown Lake Village at a junction with US 82, with US 65/US 82/US 278 continuing south toward Louisiana and Mississippi. Highway 144 enters the city as St. Mary's Street, passing the New Hope Missionary Baptist Church Cemetery, Historic Section, which is listed on the National Register of Historic Places. The route continues east along the southern edge of downtown Lake Village toward Lake Chicot, where it turns north at an intersection with Highway 159. Highway 144 continues north along the lake, serving as the eastern boundary of the Lake Village Commercial Historic District before eviting the city limits. The route intersects two segments of Highway 257 before intersecting a Mississippi River levee, where the route terminates.

== History ==
Highway 144 was created by the Arkansas State Highway Commission (ASHC) between US 165 and McMillan Corner. It first appeared on the 1933 state highway map. The route was extended east along former US 82 to Leland landing, the main ferry crossing on the Mississippi River in the area, on the 1940 state highway map. US 82 had been rerouted onto the new Benjamin G. Humphreys Bridge, providing travelers with a bridge connection across the river.

The highway in Arkansas County was created March 28, 1973 pursuant to Act 9 of 1973 passed by the Arkansas General Assembly. The act directed county judges and legislators to designate up to 12 miles (19 km) of county roads as state highways in each county.

== Major intersections ==
Mile markers reset at some concurrencies.

County	Location	mi	km	Destinations	Notes
Arkansas		0.00	0.00	Big Bayou Meto Use Area	Western terminus
Arkansas	Crossett	4.16	6.69	US 165 / Great River Road – DeWitt, Dumas	Eastern terminus
Gap in route
Drew–Ashley county line		0.00	0.00	US 165 – Montrose, McGehee	Western terminus
Chicot		4.00	6.44	AR 293	
Chicot	McMillan Corner	9.63	15.50	US 65 north / US 278 west / Great River Road north / AR 257 south – McGehee, Lake Village, Lake Chicot State Park	Begin US 65/US 278/GRR overlap, AR 257 northern terminus
Chicot	Lake Village	0.00	0.00	US 65 south / US 82 / US 278 east / Great River Road south – Pine Bluff, Greenville, MS, Tallulah, LA	End US 65/US 278/GRR overlap
Chicot	Lake Village	0.58	0.93	AR 159 south (Lakeshore Drive)	AR 159 northern terminus
Chicot		3.68	5.92	AR 257 north	AR 257 southern terminus
Chicot		7.80	12.55	AR 257 south	AR 257 northern terminus
Chicot		10.87	17.49	End state maintenance	Eastern terminus
1.000 mi = 1.609 km; 1.000 km = 0.621 mi: Concurrency terminus
