= List of lakes of Chicot County, Arkansas =

There are at least 42 named lakes and reservoirs in Chicot County, Arkansas.

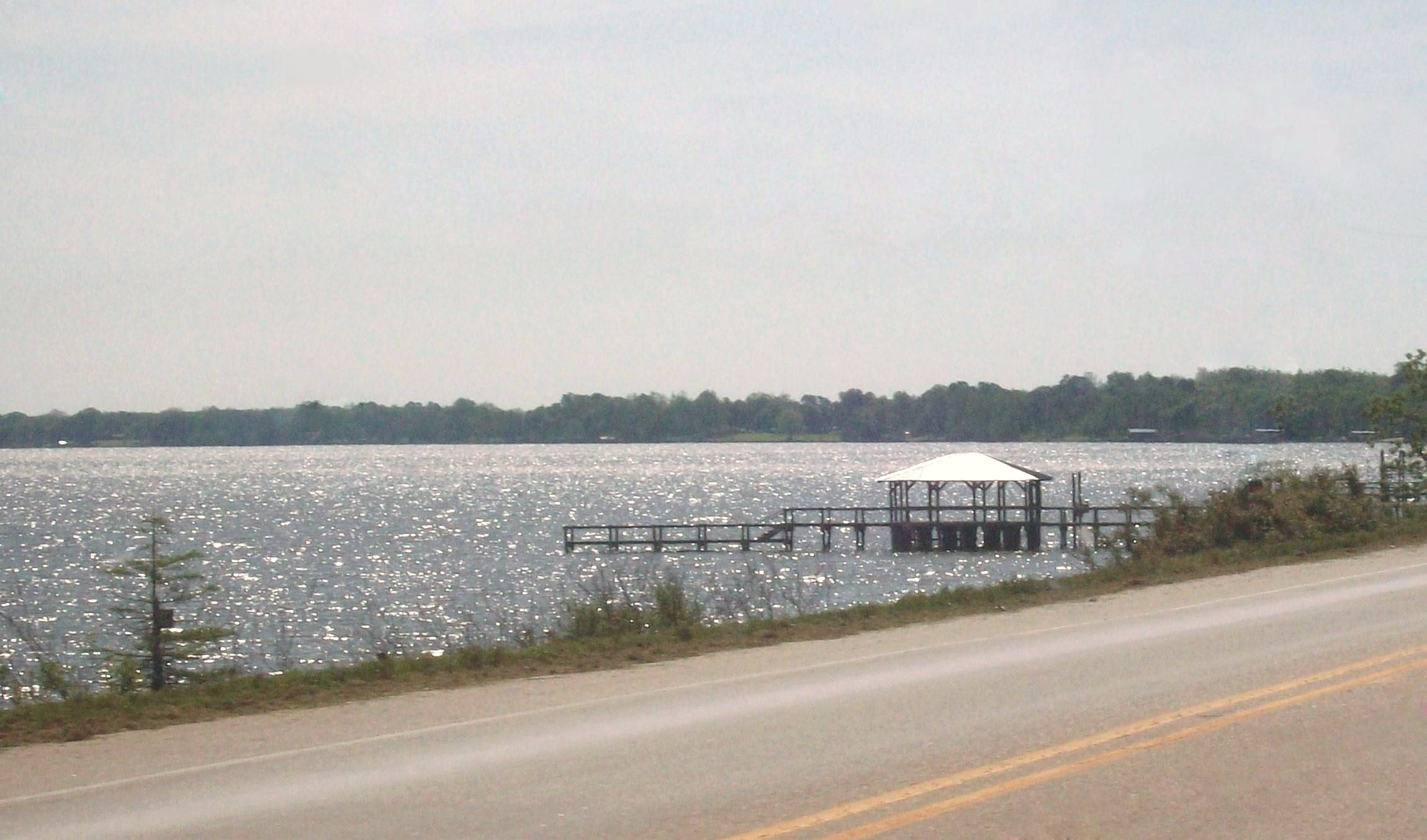
Lake Chicot State Park is the center of recreation and camping on Lake Chicot.

== Lakes ==
- Archer Lake, 33°24′5″N 091°05′27″W, el. 112 feet (34 m)
- Beaver Lake, 33°18′5″N 091°08′56″W, el. 105 feet (32 m)
- Blue Bayou, 33°16′5″N 091°09′25″W, el. 105 feet (32 m)
- Blue Hole Lake, 33°23′5″N 091°05′54″W, el. 105 feet (32 m)
- Camp Lake, 33°25′5″N 091°10′06″W, el. 108 feet (33 m)
- Camp Lake, 33°25′5″N 091°10′02″W, el. 108 feet (33 m)
- Carolina Chute, 33°03′5″N 091°07′20″W, el. 92 feet (28 m)
- Cocklebur Lake, 33°26′5″N 091°08′12″W, el. 108 feet (33 m)
- Cornfield Chute, 33°09′5″N 091°07′11″W, el. 95 feet (29 m)
- Cottonwood Chute, 33°17′5″N 091°08′42″W, el. 112 feet (34 m)
- Dry Lake, 33°25′5″N 091°08′35″W, el. 108 feet (33 m)
- Duck Lake, 33°26′5″N 091°16′01″W, el. 128 feet (39 m)
- Eunice Chute, 33°29′5″N 091°12′34″W, el. 115 feet (35 m)
- Grand Lake, 33°04′5″N 091°12′16″W, el. 102 feet (31 m)
- Grassy Lake, 33°19′5″N 091°14′44″W, el. 108 feet (33 m)
- Lafourche Lake, 33°03′5″N 091°24′45″W, el. 89 feet (27 m)
- Lake Boggy Bayou, 33°28′5″N 091°14′21″W, el. 118 feet (36 m)
- Lake Chicot, 33°16′5″N 091°13′37″W, el. 102 feet (31 m)
- Lake Ferguson, 33°24′5″N 091°04′14″W, el. 95 feet (29 m)
- Lake Lee, 33°16′5″N 091°02′43″W, el. 95 feet (29 m)
- Lake Paradise, 33°28′5″N 091°10′32″W, el. 105 feet (32 m)
- Lake Port, 33°14′5″N 091°08′17″W, el. 108 feet (33 m)
- Leland Chute, 33°21′5″N 091°09′41″W, el. 112 feet (34 m)
- Long Lake, 33°26′5″N 091°09′30″W, el. 115 feet (35 m)
- Macon Lake, 33°26′5″N 091°18′54″W, el. 108 feet (33 m)
- Moon Chute, 33°09′5″N 091°09′53″W, el. 98 feet (30 m)
- Mud Lake, 33°25′5″N 091°09′33″W, el. 108 feet (33 m)
- Muddy Lake, 33°19′5″N 091°14′13″W, el. 108 feet (33 m)
- Otter Bayou, 33°11′5″N 091°11′29″W, el. 102 feet (31 m)
- Otter Lake, 33°12′5″N 091°11′13″W, el. 102 feet (31 m)
- Snag Lake, 33°00′5″N 091°12′03″W, el. 95 feet (29 m)
- Snag Lake, 33°00′5″N 091°12′12″W, el. 95 feet (29 m)
- Swan Pond, 33°20′5″N 091°12′59″W, el. 115 feet (35 m)
- Whiskey Chute, 33°18′5″N 091°11′23″W, el. 112 feet (34 m)
- Willow Lake, 33°02′5″N 091°10′39″W, el. 98 feet (30 m)
- Willow Lake, 33°25′5″N 091°11′15″W, el. 108 feet (33 m)

== Reservoirs ==
- Ball Lake, 33°04′5″N 091°14′48″W, el. 105 feet (32 m)
- Ball Lake, 33°04′5″N 091°15′03″W, el. 105 feet (32 m)
- Lake Chicot, 33°15′5″N 091°13′18″W, el. 98 feet (30 m)
- Lake Paradise, 33°29′5″N 091°10′30″W, el. 125 feet (38 m)
- Lake Wallace, 33°27′5″N 091°27′49″W, el. 125 feet (38 m)
- Whiskey Chute Reservoir, 33°21′5″N 091°14′38″W, el. 108 feet (33 m)

== See also ==
- List of lakes in Arkansas
