= Arkansas Highway 142 =

Highway in Arkansas

Highway 142
- Highway 142 highlighted in red

Route information
- Maintained by ArDOT
- Length: 5.14 mi (8.27 km)
- Existed: 1931–present

Major junctions
- South end: Levee Road near Lakeport
- North end: US 82 / US 278 at Shives

Location
- Country: United States
- State: Arkansas
- Counties: Chicot

Highway system
- Arkansas Highway System; Interstate; US; State; Business; Spurs; Suffixed; Scenic; Heritage
← AR 141	→ AR 143

Highway 142 (AR 142) is a north–south state highway in Chicot County, Arkansas. The route starts its southern terminus at Levee Road near Lakeport. The road then travels north, passing through the Lakeport Plantation. It ends at its northern terminus at U.S. Route 82 (US 82) and US 278 in Shives. AR 142 was designated in 1931, from US 61 to the Mississippi River, and part of the route was redesignated as part of US 82 in 1940. The route was paved in asphalt by 1962. The route is maintained by the Arkansas Department of Transportation (ArDOT).

== Route description ==
All of the route is in Chicot County. In 2016, the Arkansas State Highway and Transportation Department (AHTD) measured about 410 vehicles travelling near US 82 and US 278 on average each day.

AR 142 starts at Levee Road (CR 73), near the unincorporated area of Lakeport. The route begins travelling westward until it reaches a graded road, where it turns northwest. The road travels through farmland, intersecting Black Water Road (CR 72) which leads to Eminence. The road then crosses over Weaver and Eminence Bayous, and it turns west near the Lakeport Plantation. After travelling westward shortly, AR 142 turns north at Robert Mazzanti Road. The road then crosses over a drainage ditch, and it intersects James Roy Road afterwards. Near Shives, the route turns west past a gravel road. AR 142 ends at its intersection with US 82 and US 278 at the center of Shives. Past the intersection, the road continues to Lakehall Road (CR 71).

== History ==
AR 142 was designated in 1931, along a gravel road starting from US 61 southeast of Lake Village, to a point west of the Mississippi River. The route was realigned onto a new unimproved road near its southern terminus in 1939, which was paved in gravel by 1940. The section near Lake Village became part of US 82 and was paved in asphalt that year. In 1952, AR 142 was connected to a county road that extended to Grand Lake, which was removed eight years later. The route was completely paved in asphalt by 1962, which cost $214,999 (equivalent to $2,316,387 in 2025).

== Major intersections ==
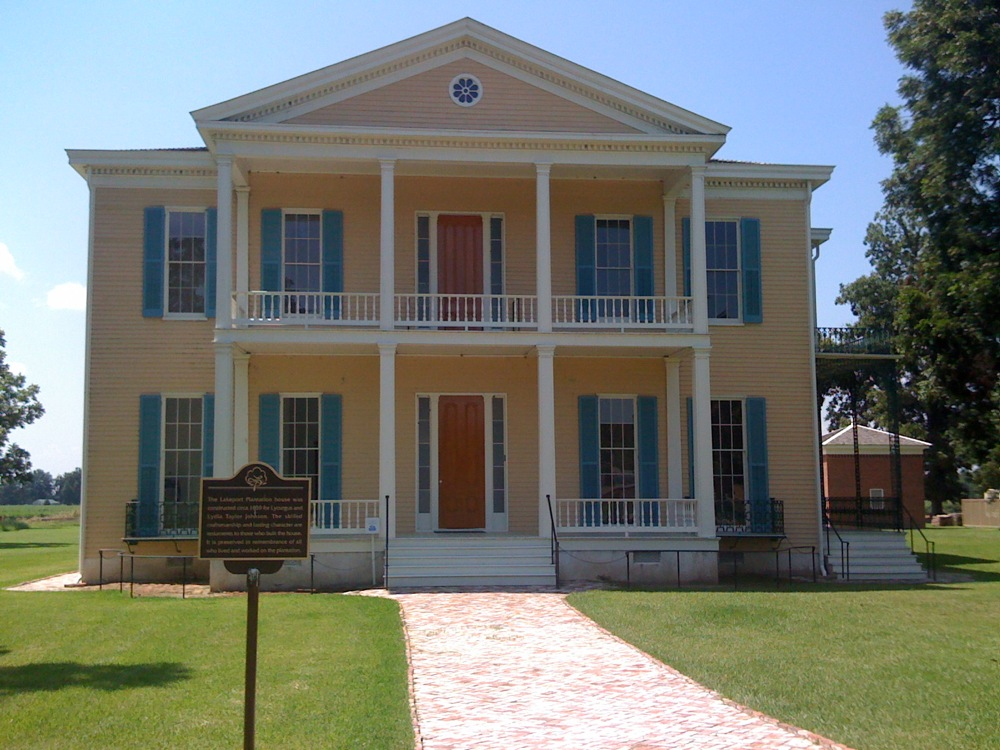
Lakeport Plantation near AR 142

The entire route is in Chicot County.

Location	mi	km	Destinations	Notes
	0.00	0.00	CR 73 (Levee Road)	Southern terminus
	5.14	8.27	US 82 / US 278	Northern terminus
1.000 mi = 1.609 km; 1.000 km = 0.621 mi

== See also ==
- List of state highways in Arkansas
