= Refuge, Mississippi =

- Unincorporated community
- Location within Mississippi
- Coordinates: 33°18′13″N 91°08′11″W
- Country: United States
- State: Mississippi
- County: Washington
- Elevation: 125 ft (38 m)
- Time zone: UTC-6 (Central (CST))
  - Summer (DST): UTC-5 (CDT)
- GNIS feature ID: 676590

Refuge is an unincorporated community located in Washington County, Mississippi, United States.

Refuge Landing was located west of the settlement, directly on the Mississippi River.

== History ==
Francis Griffin purchased land in 1831 on a high ridge bordering the Mississippi River where he established "Refuge Plantation". By 1850, Griffin had 150 slaves working on his plantation. The Refuge Plantation House, shaded by oak trees and protected from the river by a levee system, was erected with a view of the river, and remains today one of the best examples of a mid-nineteenth-century plantation house in Washington County.

Refuge had a post office. The population in 1900 was 30.

Old Refuge Cemetery, now extinct, was located north of the settlement.

== Recent development ==
Harlow's Casino Resort opened in 2007 in Refuge.

In 2010, the Greenville Bridge was opened connecting Refuge with Shives, Arkansas.
