= Geno Mazzanti =

American football player (1929–2013)

No. 83, 87
- Position: Halfback

Personal information
- Born: April 1, 1929; Lake Village, Arkansas, U.S.
- Died: July 24, 2013 (aged 84); Greenville, Mississippi, U.S.
- Listed height: 5 ft 11 in (1.80 m)
- Listed weight: 190 lb (86 kg)

Career information
- High school: Lakeside (Lake Village)
- College: Arkansas (1946–1949)
- NFL draft: 1950: 26th round, 327th overall pick

Career history
- Baltimore Colts (1950); Ottawa Rough Riders (1952)

Awards and highlights
- Second-team All-SWC (1949)

Career NFL statistics
- Rushing yards: 22
- Rushing average: 3.1
- Receptions: 1
- Receiving yards: 11
- Total touchdowns: 1
- Stats at Pro Football Reference

Geno Mazzanti (April 1, 1929 – July 24, 2013) was an American professional football halfback.

A native of Lake Village, Arkansas, he played college football for the Arkansas Razorbacks. He was the brother of Jerry Mazzanti. He ran 77 yards for the game-winning touchdown against Vanderbilt in 1949 and was selected by the United Press as a second-team back on the 1949 All-Southwest Conference football team.

Mazzanti was selected 327th overall by the Baltimore Colts in the 26th round of the 1950 NFL draft. He signed with the Colts in May 1950. He played at the halfback position during the 1950 Colts season. He appeared in a total of five NFL games and had seven carries for 22 yards and one touchdown.

He also played in the Canadian Football League (CFL) for the Ottawa Rough Riders during the 1952 season. He appeared in four games for Ottawa, three of them as a starter. He also served as an assistant coach for the 1952 Rough Riders.
