= Ross Van Ness, Arkansas =

- Unincorporated community
- Location within Arkansas Location within the United States
- Coordinates: 33°06′37″N 91°20′55″W
- Country: United States
- State: Arkansas
- County: Chicot
- Elevation: 118 ft (36 m)
- Time zone: UTC-6 (Central (CST))
  - Summer (DST): UTC-5 (CDT)
- GNIS feature ID: 61776

Ross Van Ness is an unincorporated community in Chicot County, Arkansas, United States.

It is served by the Lakeside School District. On July 1, 1985, the Ross Van Ness School District consolidated into the Eudora School District. On February 13, 2006, the Eudora district consolidated into the Lakeside School District.
