= Lakeside School District (Lake Village, Arkansas) =

School district in Arkansas

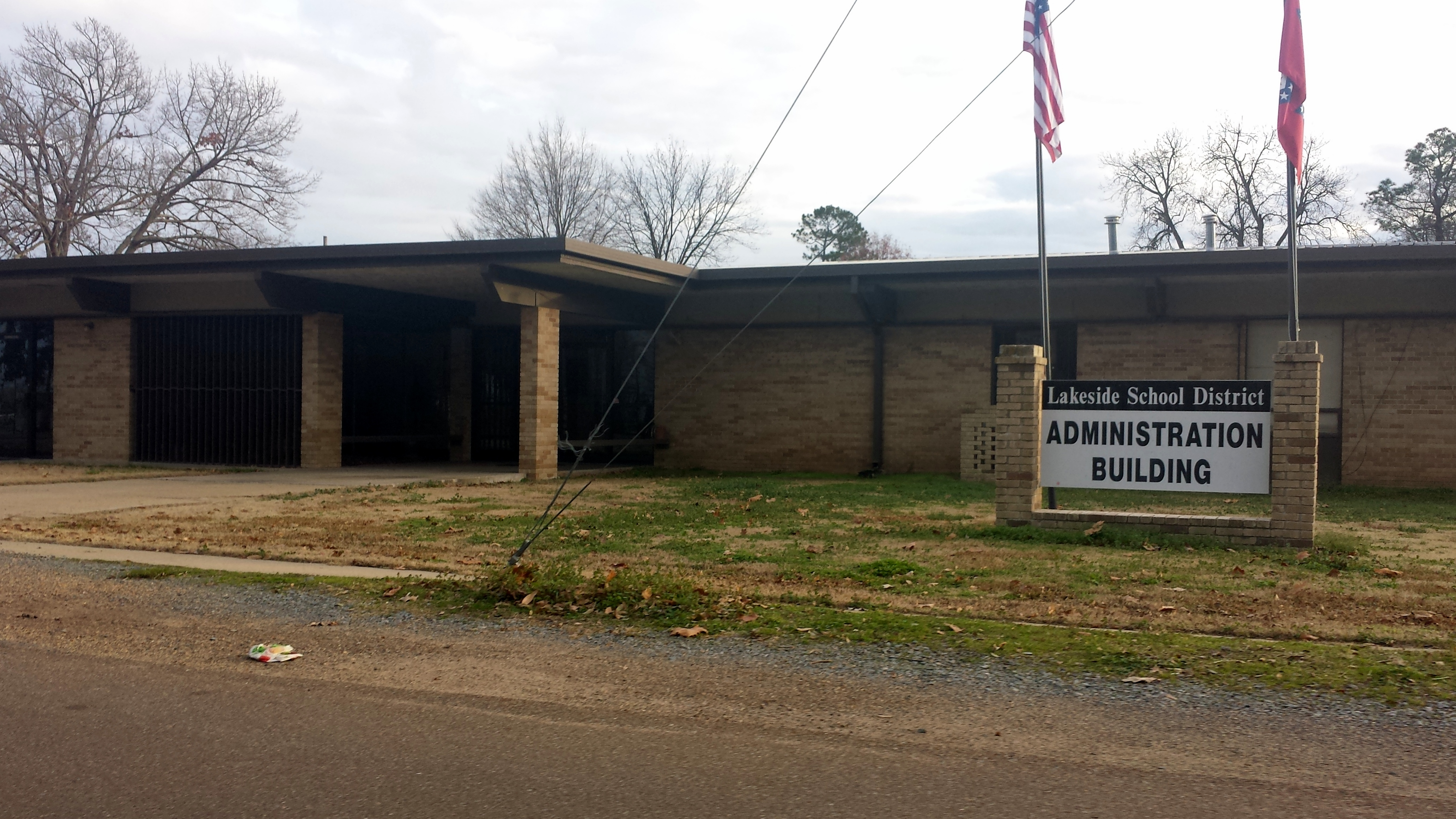

Location
- 1110 South Lakeshore; Lake Village, Arkansas 72433 United States
- Coordinates: 33°19′30″N 91°18′38″W

District information
- Grades: PK–12
- Superintendent: Dr. Billy Adams
- Accreditation: ADE
- Schools: 5
- NCES District ID: 0508640

Students and staff
- Students: 1,250
- Teachers: 105.64 (on FTE basis)
- Staff: 234.64 (on FTE basis)
- Student–teacher ratio: 11.83

Other information
- Website: www.lakesidesd.com

Lakeside School District is a public school district based in Lake Village, Arkansas, United States. The Lakeside School District encompasses 242.54 square miles (628.2 km^{2}) of land including all or portions of Chicot County and Ashley County communities. Incorporated places within the district include Lake Village in Chicot County, and Montrose in Ashley County. It also serves the Chicot County unincorporated area of Ross Van Ness.

Lakeside School District provides early childhood, elementary and secondary education for more than 1,200 prekindergarten through grade 12 at its five schools. Lakeside School District schools are accredited by the Arkansas Department of Education (ADE).

== History ==
On February 13, 2006, the Eudora School District consolidated into the Lakeside School District.

== Schools ==
Secondary education

- Lakeside High School—grades 9 through 12.
- Lakeside Middle School—grades 6 through 8.

Ełementary education

- Lakeside Upper Elementary School—grades 3 through 5
- Lakeside Lower Elementary School—prekindergarten through grade 2.
- Eudora Elementary School—prekindergarten through grade 3.
