= Jerry Mazzanti =

American football defensive end

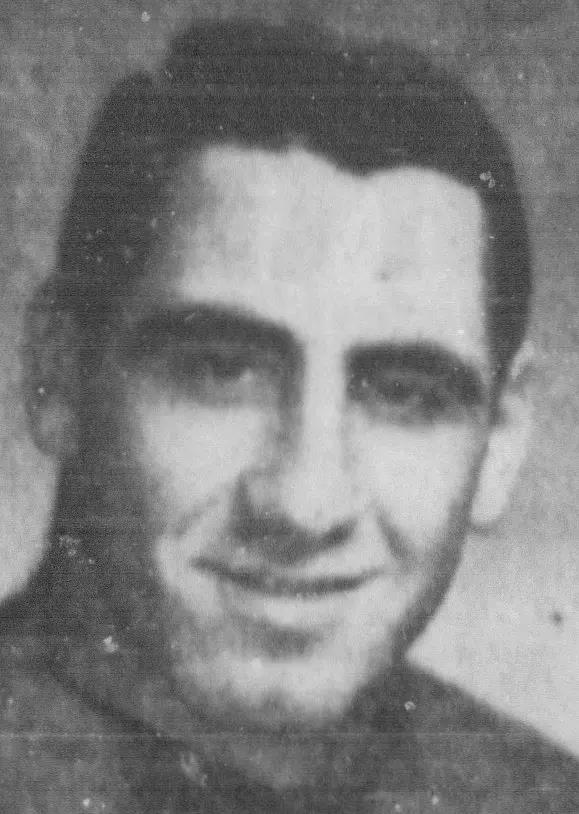
- Mazzanti in 1960

No. 62, 83, 61
- Position: Defensive end

Personal information
- Born: July 13, 1940; Lake Village, Arkansas, U.S.
- Died: January 18, 2025 (aged 84); Lake Village, Arkansas, U.S.

Career information
- High school: Lakeside
- College: Arkansas (1959–1962)

Career history
- Philadelphia Eagles (1963); Detroit Lions (1966); Pittsburgh Steelers (1967–1968); Minnesota Vikings (1968–1969)*
- * Offseason or practice squad member only
- Stats at Pro Football Reference

Jerry Edward Mazzanti (July 13, 1940 – January 18, 2025) was an American football defensive end. He played for the Philadelphia Eagles, the Detroit Lions, the Pittsburgh Steelers and the Minnesota Vikings of the National Football League (NFL).

== Life and career ==
Mazzanti was born in Lake Village, Arkansas, the son of Egino Mazzanti and Franchina Carnevaletti. He was the brother of Geno Mazzanti, a halfback for the Baltimore Colts. He played high school football at Lakeside High School, and was co-captain of the football team in 1957. He then enrolled at the University of Arkansas to play college football for the Arkansas Razorbacks. He was on the freshman team in 1959, and was a three-year varsity letterman from 1960 to 1962. He served as a second lieutenant in the United States Army.

In December 1961, Mazzanti was selected by the Philadelphia Eagles of the National Football League (NFL), and he joined the team in 1963. He started two games for the team, and played in five games during the 1963 NFL season. In October 1963, he was placed on the injured reserve list, and in August 1966, he was traded to the Detroit Lions. He started one game for the team, and played in thirteen games during the 1966 NFL season. In August 1967, he was traded to the Pittsburgh Steelers, and he played in twelve games during the 1967 NFL season, but was released from the team in August 1968. In September 1968, he was placed on the Minnesota Vikings's taxi squad, and in June 1969, he joined the team, but was released from the team in September 1969.

== Death ==
Mazzanti died on January 18, 2025, in Lake Village, Arkansas, at the age of 84.
