= Eudora School District =

Eudora School District may refer to:

== United States ==
- Eudora School District (Arkansas) — Eudora, Arkansas
- Eudora USD 491 — Eudora, Kansas
