= Arkansas Highway 143 =

Highway in Arkansas

Highway 143

Route information
- Maintained by ArDOT
- Length: 10.08 mi (16.22 km)
- Existed: June 23, 1965–present

Major junctions
- South end: US 62 / AR 980 near Pleasant Valley
- North end: Route H at the Missouri state line in Golden, MO

Location
- Country: United States
- State: Arkansas
- Counties: Carroll

Highway system
- Arkansas Highway System; Interstate; US; State; Business; Spurs; Suffixed; Scenic; Heritage
← AR 142	→ AR 144

Highway 143 (AR 143, Ark. 143, and Hwy. 143) is a north–south state highway in Carroll County, Arkansas. The highway begins at US Highway 62 (US 62) and Highway 980 near Pleasant Valley and runs northwest to Missouri supplemental route H at the Missouri state line. The route is maintained by the Arkansas Department of Transportation (ArDOT).

== Route description ==
Highway 143 begins at US 62 and Highway 980 north of the Carroll County Airport. The route runs north through a rural area of the Ozarks, only passing two unincorporated communities: Grandview and Pleasant Ridge. Highway 143 winds toward the Missouri state line, where the route continues as Supplemental Route H, which runs north to Missouri Route 86.

== History ==
The original Highway 143 was created in 1931 from Highway 18 in Black Oak south to US 63 southeast of Tyronza Township. This route became part of Highway 135 in 1955. The current Highway 143 was created by the Arkansas State Highway Commission on June 23, 1965. The route was paved from US 62 to Grandview in 1974, with the remainder being bituminous surface/gravel. The entire routing was paved by 1988.

== Major intersections ==
The entire route is in Carroll County.

Location	mi	km	Destinations	Notes
	0.00	0.00	US 62 / AR 980 south – Berryville, Eureka Springs, Carroll County Airport	Southern terminus, AR 980 northern terminus
Pleasant Ridge	10.08	16.22	Route H	Northern terminus
1.000 mi = 1.609 km; 1.000 km = 0.621 mi

== See also ==
- List of state highways in Arkansas
