= Charles W. Dean Bridge =

Bridge in Arkansas and Mississippi, US

- Coordinates: 33°37′12″N 91°08′10″W
- Carries: 4 lanes of I-69 / US 278
- Crosses: Mississippi River
- Locale: Arkansas City, Arkansas, and Benoit, Mississippi
- Other name: Great River Bridge

Characteristics
- Design: Cable-stayed bridge
- Longest span: 1,500 feet (457 m)
- Clearance below: 85 feet (26 m)

Location
- Interactive map of Charles W. Dean Bridge

The Charles W. Dean Bridge, known before 1999 as the Great River Bridge, is a planned cable-stayed bridge to carry Interstate 69 and U.S. Route 278 across the Mississippi River between Arkansas City, Arkansas, and Benoit, Mississippi. The Arkansas State Highway and Transportation Department began land acquisition for the project in October 2006, but no funding has been provided for construction as of September 2026.

Preliminary studies indicate the bridge, which is part of I-69 SIU 12, would be 4.25 miles (6.84 km) long, with one 1,500-foot (460 m) cable-stayed span over the main channel of the river supported by two 450-foot (140 m) towers. A cost of $565 million has been estimated.

The structure's name commemorates Charles W. Dean (1927–1998), an engineer from Cleveland, Mississippi, who proposed the bridge in 1984. A Mississippi legislative act named the proposed bridge after Dean in 1999.

== History and development ==
The Great River Bridge was originally proposed by Mississippi engineer Charles W. Dean in 1984. Originally part of the planned relocation of US-278 through the lower Mississippi Delta, the Federal Highway Administration (FHWA) approved the environmental impact statement (EIS) and issued a Record of Decision (ROD) for the bridge in 2004.

It has been determined that the Charles W. Dean Bridge will also carry Interstate 69, following FHWA approvals for sections of I-69 in Arkansas in 2006 and Mississippi in 2010 that will connect to either end of the bridge.

== Project status ==
The Charles W. Dean Bridge project has cleared all of its environmental and permitting reviews, and is considered "shovel ready," pending the availability of funds for construction. As of 2025, the bridge has been approved by Congress for funding, but has not actually been funded yet. The state of Arkansas began to purchase land for the bridge starting in October 2006. In its 2011-2013 Statewide Transportation Improvement Plan, the AHTD stated intentions to begin construction of the Arkansas approach roadways and structures in 2011, subject to funding. Construction of the bridge and the remaining connections is contingent upon funding. No construction has taken place on the bridge or its approaches, and only limited enhancements have been made to the I-69 corridor in Arkansas. Additionally, there have been minimal developments in extending I-69 in Mississippi.

In 2017, the status of the bridge was brought to Congress's attention, and plans were floated to make the bridge an active project.

As of 2024, the entire I-69 project in Arkansas is mostly on hold (except for a small piece near Monticello, Arkansas) as well as the extending Mississippi section being on hold due to lack of funding.

== See also ==
- List of crossings of the Lower Mississippi River
- Greenville Bridge
