= Arkansas Highway 3 =

Former state highway in Arkansas, United States

State Road 3

Route information
- Maintained by AHD
- Length: 263 mi (423 km)
- Existed: 1926–1940

Major junctions
- South end: LA 159 at the Louisiana state line
- AR 4 in Camden; US 167 in Fordyce; US 65 in Pine Bluff; US 63 in Pine Bluff; US 165 in Stuttgart; US 63 near West Memphis
- North end: US 64 northwest of West Memphis

Location
- Country: United States
- State: Arkansas
- Counties: Columbia, Ouachita, Calhoun, Dallas, Cleveland, Jefferson, Arkansas, Prairie, Monroe, Lee, St. Francis, Crittenden

Highway system
- Arkansas Highway System; Interstate; US; State; Business; Spurs; Suffixed; Scenic; Heritage
← AR 2	→ AR 4

Highway 3 (AR 3, Ark. 3, Hwy. 3, formerly State Road 3) was a state highway in southern Arkansas. Running predominantly southwest to northeast, its southern terminus was at the Louisiana state line approximately 18 miles (29 km) south of Magnolia, Arkansas. Its northern terminus was at U.S. Highway 64 approximately 3 miles (4.8 km) north of Lehi. It was maintained by the Arkansas Highway Department (AHD), now known as the Arkansas Department of Transportation (ArDOT).

Between Magnolia and Lehi, Highway 3 was replaced in 1935 by US 79, splitting Highway 3 into 2 sections; one segment south of Lehi later became Highway 147 and Highway 50. In late 1936, Highway 3 had a third segment added between McNeil and Waldo. In 1939, the segment between Magnolia and the Louisiana state line was transferred to Highway 19. In mid-1940, the segment north of Lehi was replaced by Highway 147, and the segment from McNeil to Waldo was renumbered Highway 98.
