= Lamar McHan =

American football player and coach (1932–1998)

- McHan as a collegian at Arkansas, c. 1953

No. 8, 17, 14, 15
- Position: Quarterback

Personal information
- Born: December 16, 1932; Lake Village, Arkansas, U.S.
- Died: November 23, 1998 (aged 65); Jefferson, Louisiana, U.S.
- Listed height: 6 ft 1 in (1.85 m)
- Listed weight: 201 lb (91 kg)

Career information
- High school: Lakeside (Lake Village)
- College: Arkansas
- NFL draft: 1954: 1st round, 2nd overall pick

Career history

Playing
- Chicago Cardinals (1954–1958); Green Bay Packers (1959–1960); Baltimore Colts (1961–1963); San Francisco 49ers (1963); Toronto Argonauts (1965)

Coaching
- Northern Arizona (1969-1970) Assistant coach; University of Texas at Arlington (1971-1973) Assistant coach; New Orleans Saints (1974–1975, 1978–1984) Quarterbacks/receivers coach

Awards and highlights
- First-team All-SWC (1953)

Career NFL statistics
- Passing attempts: 1,442
- Passing completions: 610
- Completion percentage: 42.3%
- TD–INT: 73-108
- Passing yards: 9,449
- Passer rating: 50.3
- Stats at Pro Football Reference

Clarence Lamar McHan (December 16, 1932 – November 23, 1998) was an American professional football player and coach. He played professionally for ten seasons as a quarterback in the National Football League (NFL) for the Chicago Cardinals, Green Bay Packers, Baltimore Colts, and San Francisco 49ers.

== Early life ==
Born and raised in Lake Village, Arkansas, McHan graduated from its Lakeside High School and played college football at the University of Arkansas in Fayetteville where he was a single-wing tailback. He was ninth in the 1953 Heisman Trophy balloting and played in the Blue-Gray Game in December and the College All-Star Game in Chicago in August 1954.

== Playing career ==
McHan was the second overall selection of the 1954 NFL draft, taken by the Chicago Cardinals. He played with the Cardinals for five seasons, through 1958, but was suspended and fined by the team in November 1956 for insubordination.

McHan was traded to the Green Bay Packers in May 1959, under first-year head coach and general manager Vince Lombardi. In 1959, he was the starting quarterback for the first six games, then had a minor leg injury, and was replaced by future hall of fame quarterback Bart Starr. McHan started and won several games in 1960, then was traded to the Baltimore Colts in March 1961, and played behind Johnny Unitas. He was waived by the Colts in September 1963 and was picked up by San Francisco. He played briefly with the Toronto Argonauts of the Canadian Football League (CFL) in 1965, winning the starting job at training camp, only to be cut after losing his first two starts.

== Coaching career ==
After retiring from football, McHan became an assistant coach at Northern Arizona University in Flagstaff, and at the University of Texas at Arlington. He finished out his coaching career back in the NFL with the New Orleans Saints from 1974 to 1984 under three different head coaches: John North, Dick Nolan, and Bum Phillips. (He was not on the staff of Hank Stram in 1976 and 1977.)

== Death ==
McHan died at age 65 in Jefferson, Louisiana, a suburb west of New Orleans, of a heart attack in 1998. He is buried at Garden of Memories in Metairie.
