= Harlow's Casino Resort =

Casino resort in Refuge, Mississippi

Harlow's Casino Resort & Hotel
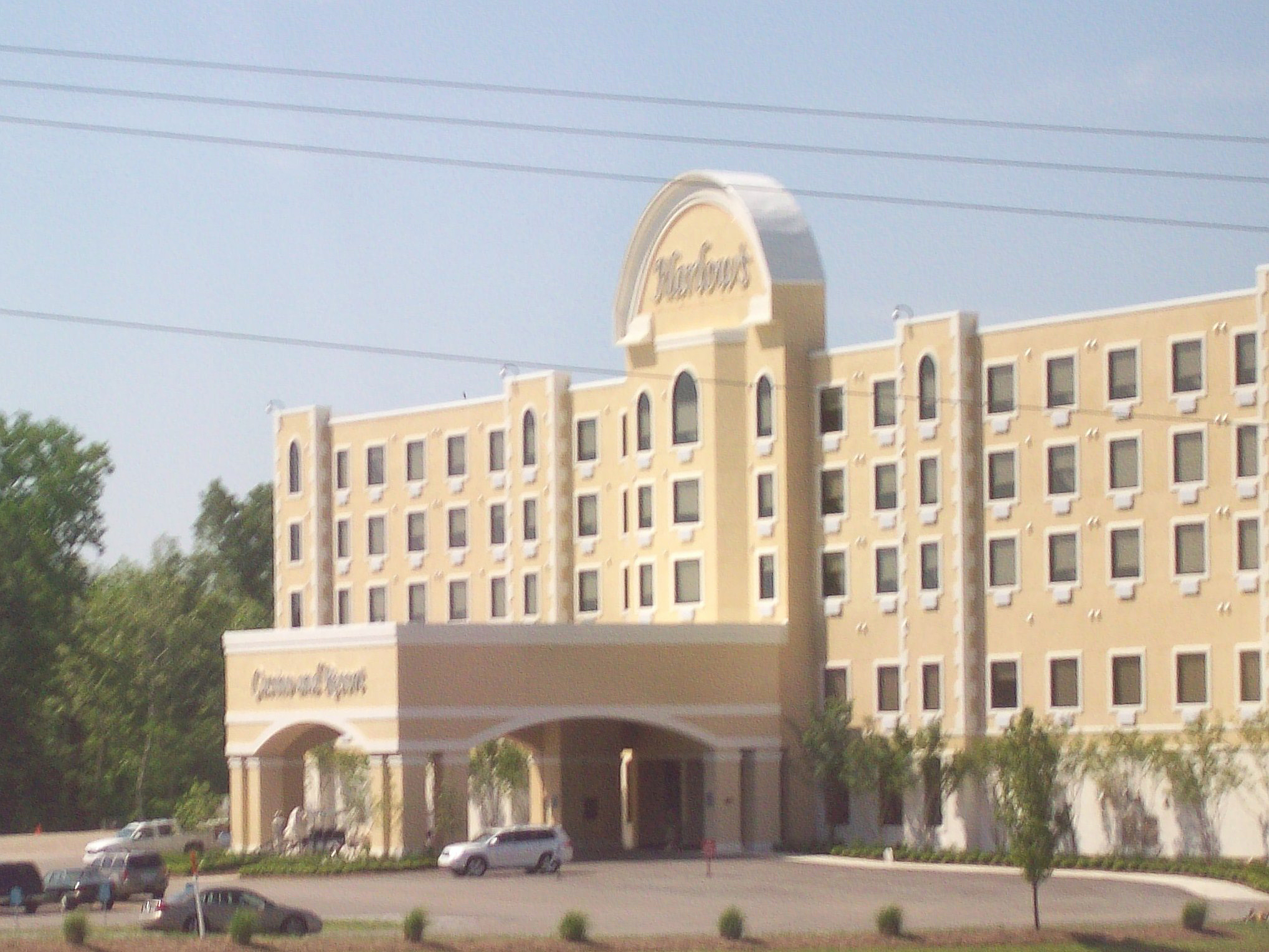
- Interactive map of Harlow's Casino Resort & Hotel
- Location: Refuge, Mississippi; 4280 Harlows Boulevard; 33.29987°N 91.14111°W
- Opened: November 27, 2007
- Theme: 30's Art Deco
- No. of rooms: 105
- Gaming space: 33,000 sq ft (3,100 m^{2})
- Notable restaurants: Delta Delights & Louis Steakhouse
- Casino type: Riverboat casino
- Owner: Churchill Downs Inc.
- Website: harlowscasino.com

Harlow's Casino Resort & Hotel is a casino located in Refuge, Mississippi, near Greenville, and approximately 1 mi (1.6 km) east of the Mississippi River. It is owned and operated by Churchill Downs Inc. Harlow's has 33,000 square feet (3,100 m^{2}) of gaming space with slot machines, blackjack, craps, and a 7-table poker room, a 105-room hotel, a 2,500-seat entertainment center, two restaurants, and three bars.

Originally the name of the casino was going to be Bali-Hai, but the owner, the late Rick Schilling, changed the name to Harlow's Casino Resort "to bring back that lavish old Hollywood style with even more grandeur to this new property". The casino is designed to reflect the era known as the Golden Age of Hollywood, a time from the 1920s to the 1960s when Hollywood experienced great growth and glamour. One of the two restaurants came from the Splash Casino, which was docked at Mhoon Landing in Tunica County, Mississippi, and is now a 400-seat buffet dining area called Legends.

Churchill Downs purchased the property in December 2010 for $138 million.

== See also ==
- List of casinos in Mississippi
