= Cosgrove, Arkansas =

- Unincorporated community
- Location within Arkansas Location within the United States
- Coordinates: 33°18′23″N 91°23′58″W
- Country: United States
- State: Arkansas
- County: Chicot
- Elevation: 118 ft (36 m)
- Time zone: UTC-6 (Central (CST))
  - Summer (DST): UTC-5 (CDT)
- Area code: 870
- GNIS feature ID: 57585

Cosgrove is an unincorporated community in Chicot County, Arkansas, United States.
