= Carroll County Airport (Arkansas) =

Airport in Arkansas, United States

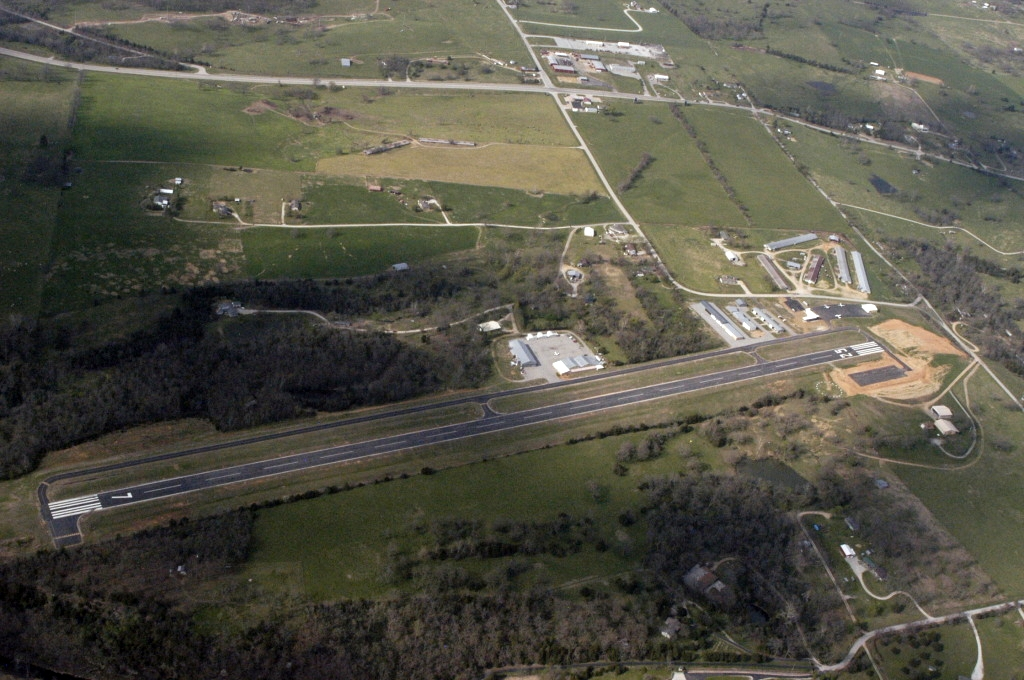
- IATA: none; ICAO: none; FAA LID: 4M1

Summary
- Airport type: Public
- Owner: Carroll County
- Serves: Berryville, Arkansas
- Elevation AMSL: 1,206 ft (368 m)
- Coordinates: 36°22′53″N 093°37′28″W
- Website: CarrollCountyAirport4M1.com

Map
- Location of airport in Arkansas 4M1 (the United States)

Runways
Direction	Length		Surface
Direction	ft	m	Surface
7/25	3,554	1,083	Asphalt

Statistics (2012)
- Aircraft operations: 21,200
- Based aircraft: 29
- Source: Federal Aviation Administration

Carroll County Airport (FAA LID: 4M1) is a county-owned, public-use airport in Carroll County, Arkansas, United States. It is located three nautical miles (6 km) west of the central business district of Berryville, Arkansas. This airport is included in the National Plan of Integrated Airport Systems for 2011–2015, which categorized it as a general aviation facility.

== Facilities and aircraft ==
Carroll County Airport covers an area of 51 acres (21 ha) at an elevation of 1,206 feet (368 m) above mean sea level. It has one runway designated 7/25 with an asphalt surface measuring 3,554 by 75 feet (1,083 x 23 m).

For the 12-month period ending July 31, 2012, the airport had 21,200 aircraft operations, an average of 58 per day: 99% general aviation and 1% military. At that time there were 29 aircraft based at this airport: 72% single-engine, 17% ultralight, 7% jet, and 3% multi-engine.

== See also ==
- List of airports in Arkansas
