= Greenville Bridge =

Bridge in Mississippi and Arkansas, US

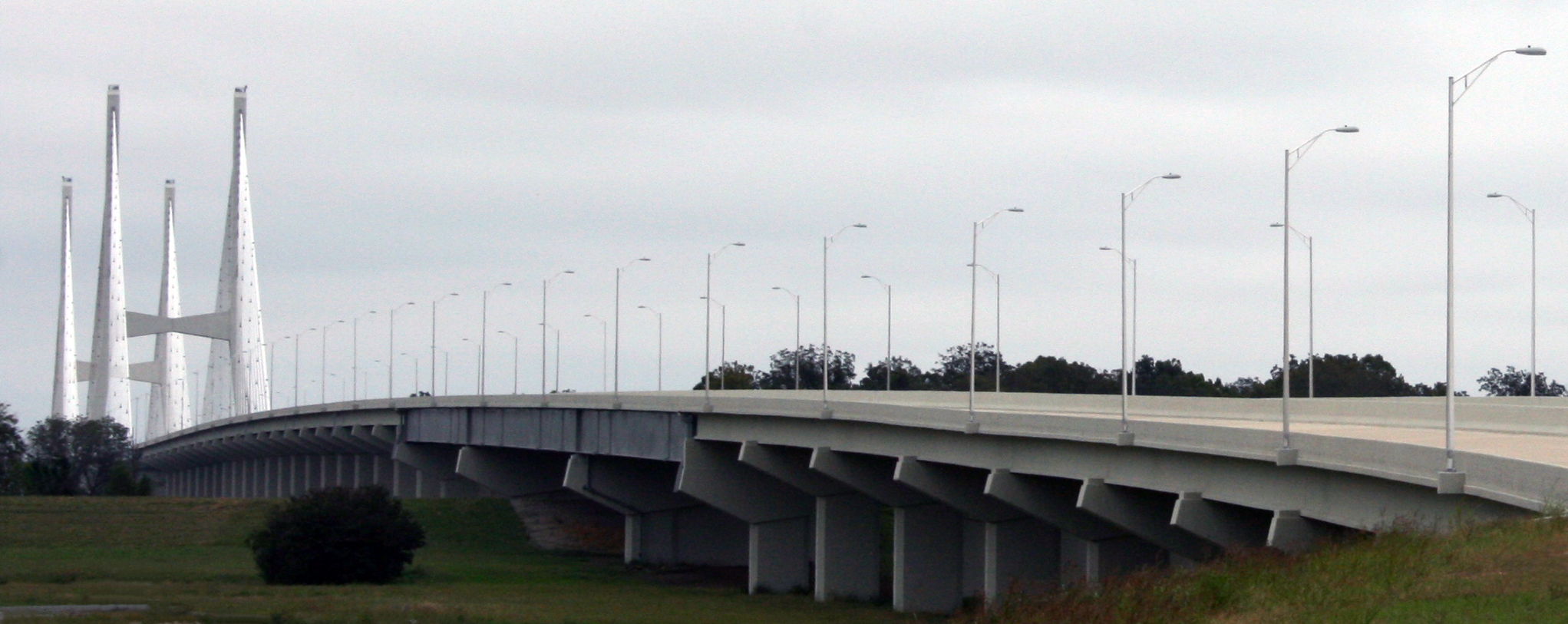
- The nearly completed bridge, viewed from the Arkansas side (October 2009)
- Coordinates: 33°17′14″N 91°09′15″W
- Carries: 4 lanes of US 82 / US 278
- Crosses: Mississippi River
- Locale: Refuge, Mississippi, and Shives, Arkansas

Characteristics
- Design: Cable-stayed bridge
- Total length: 13,560 feet (4,133 m)
- Width: 88 feet (27 m)
- Longest span: 1,378 feet (420 m)
- Clearance below: 122 feet (37 m)

History
- Opened: August 4, 2010

Location
- Interactive map of Greenville Bridge

The Greenville Bridge, or the Jesse Brent Memorial Bridge, is a cable-stayed bridge over the Mississippi River, in the United States, carrying US 82 and US 278 between Refuge, Mississippi, and Shives, Arkansas. When it opened in 2010, it was the fourth-longest cable-stayed bridge in North America.

The Benjamin G. Humphreys Bridge, the first bridge to connect the two towns, had become functionally obsolete. Its narrow road had only two lanes with no shoulders. Because of its location near a sharp bend in the Mississippi River, the bridge had become a hazard to river traffic; barges and towboats frequently collided with it. In 1994, a study concluded that a new bridge was needed and the old one should be torn down. Construction was begun in 2001 and the new bridge opened in 2010. In 2011, the process of removing the old bridge began.

== Description ==
Opened in 2010, the Greenville Bridge carries US 82/278 over the Mississippi River between Refuge, Mississippi and Shives, Arkansas. It is located 0.5 miles (0.80 km) down river from the original bridge, built in 1940. Designed by HNTB, it is a four-lane cable-stayed bridge with more than 2.5 miles (4.0 km) of bridge deck straddled by two concrete towers 425 feet (130 m) feet high and anchored by concrete piers planted 120 feet (37 m) below the riverbed. It has four fans of strand steel cable connected to the top of the towers which support the deck.

Each of the bridge's four lanes is 12 feet (4 m) wide. The outside shoulders are 12 feet (4 m) wide and the inside shoulder width is 8 feet (2 m). The bridge has a main span of 1,378 feet (420 m).

Both the old and new bridges are geographically mostly in Arkansas, as the state lines were determined prior to the shift west of the Mississippi River.

== History ==
The first Greenville Bridge, Benjamin G. Humphreys Bridge, was built by the company now known as HNTB and opened to much fanfare in 1940 as the "pathway to progress" for the Mississippi Delta. It was a through-truss design and had a span of 840 feet (260 m). Until 1943, this was the longest bridge for vehicles on the Mississippi River. Over time, the bridge supported increasing volumes of highway traffic and vehicles hitting the bridge. In the 1950s, an Air Force plane crashed into the bridge. Though the bridge remained structurally sound, it was becoming functionally obsolete. It had only two narrow highway lanes and no shoulders. An accident or the crossing of very large vehicles such as a large combine could force the bridge to close.

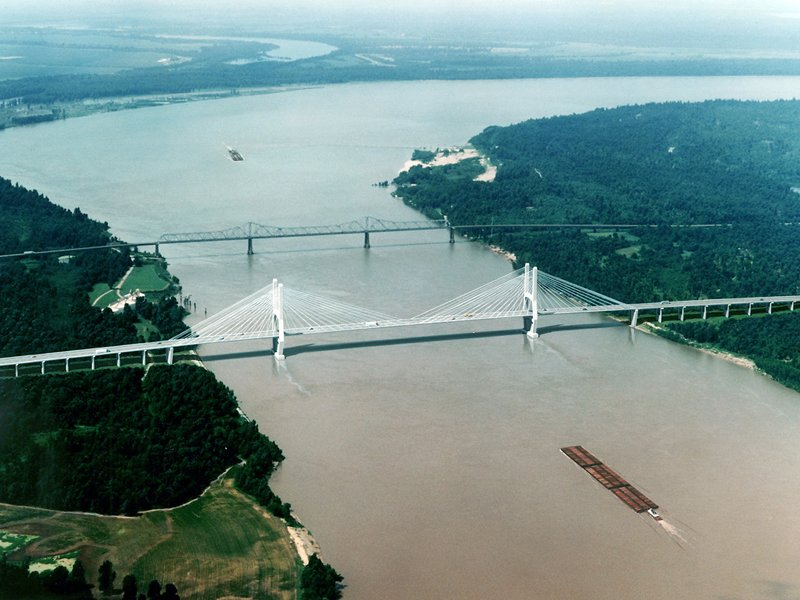
3-D artistic prototype of the new bridge with the old bridge and the sharp bend in the Mississippi River in the background

With river traffic increasing, damage from barge collisions increased. By 1972, the Greenville Bridge was hit more times by barges than any other bridge on the Mississippi. The bridge was located close to a sharp bend in the Mississippi; towboats and barges had difficulty making the sharp turn and regaining their course in time to avoid a collision with the bridge. Over the years, many have not been able to make the turn quickly and have hit it. The bridge had become a danger to river traffic.

A 1994 engineering study by the Mississippi Department of Transportation explored alternatives to upgrading the crossing of US 82 and issued a report that explored a four-lane crossing at Greenville. It concluded the best of several alternatives it identified was to build a new bridge 0.5 miles (0.80 km) downriver from the old one and to remove the old bridge. Additional studies evaluated the type of bridge to build, and by 1995 the cable-stayed bridge was chosen as the best design to fit the river and soil conditions, as well as providing sufficient clearance for river navigation. Engineering plans were completed in 1999. US 278 is planned to be relocated to the proposed Charles W. Dean Bridge if that bridge is constructed.

== Construction ==
HNTB, of Kansas City, Missouri, was the designer and consulting engineer for both the new bridge as well as the original Benjamin G. Humphreys Bridge. The federal government provided $110 million to begin building the main part of the bridge consisting long spans supported by cables. The main superstructure construction began in December 2001. Massman Construction Company in a joint venture with Traylor Brothers, Inc. received the contract to construct two large piers in the river; these were built using both floating caissons and open caisson construction. The construction on the last main span section of the bridge was finished in April 2006.

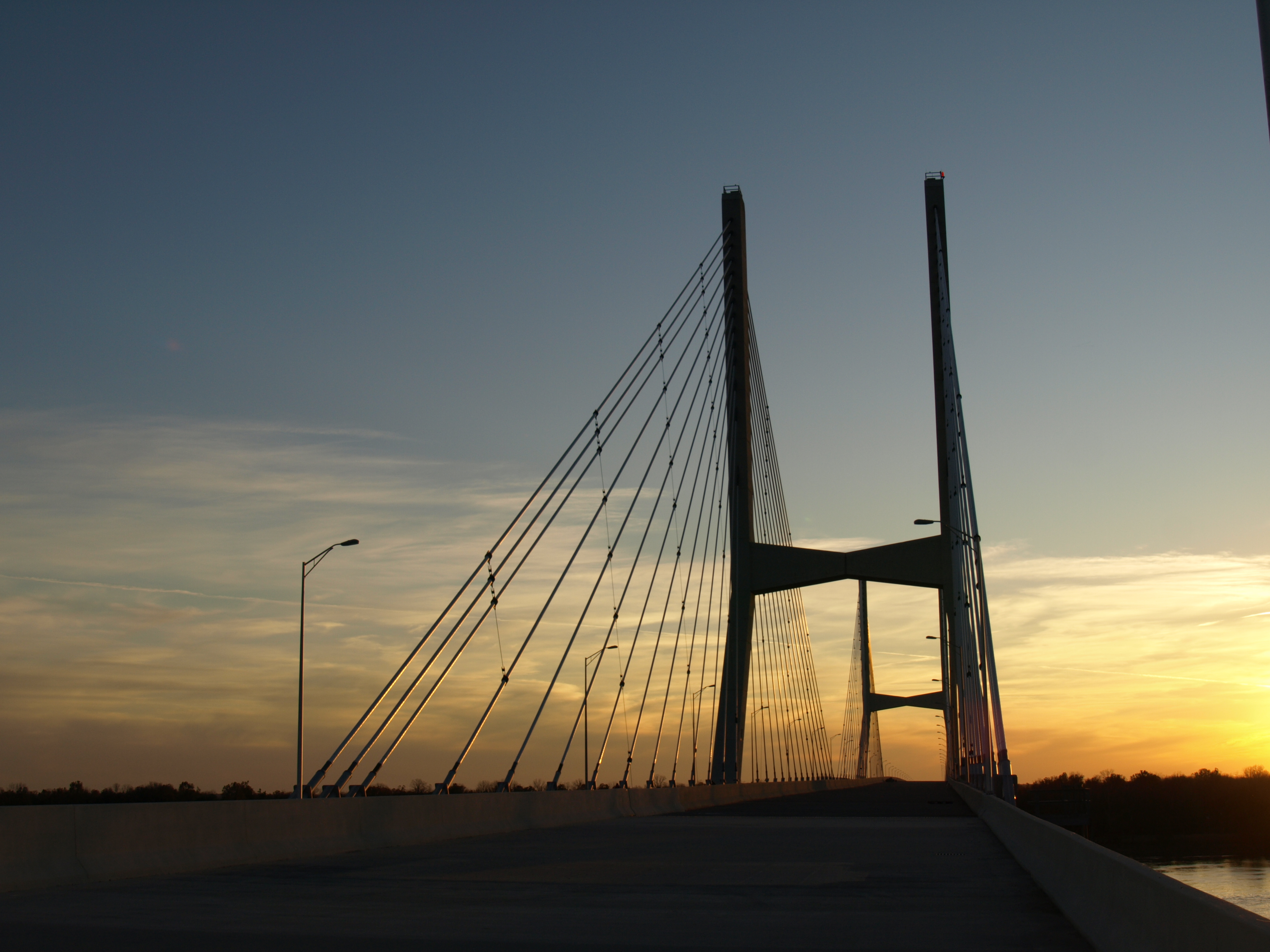
Wire cable fans on cable-stayed Greenville Bridge

Building the approaches, including shorter spans of approach bridge work and structural support systems for the bridge, was the responsibility of each state. For both states, the approach bridges are constructed of a series of three span units, each unit 120 feet (37 m) long. Construction of Arkansas' 2.5 miles (4 km) approach of highway and bridge, costing $66 million, began in March 2006; Mississippi began its 1.8 miles (2.9 km) approach in April 2006, costing almost $86 million. Hill Brothers Construction and Jensen Construction, in a joint venture with the Rasmussen Group, were awarded the contract for the eastern approach of US 82 in Greenville to the Mississippi River crossing. Hills Brothers Construction was awarded an $85.9 million contract to work on the road deck of the Mississippi approach to the bridge, the concrete footings, and the substructure and superstructure of that portion. Austin Bridge and Road was awarded a $65 million contract to build Arkansas's 4,657 feet (1,419 m) of approach bridge and 3,225 feet (983 m) of connecting roadway which was completed in August 2009. The remaining contract, to apply a latex surface to the bridge, add stripes, tie US 82 into the approaches and dismantle the Humphreys Bridge, was awarded in January 2010.

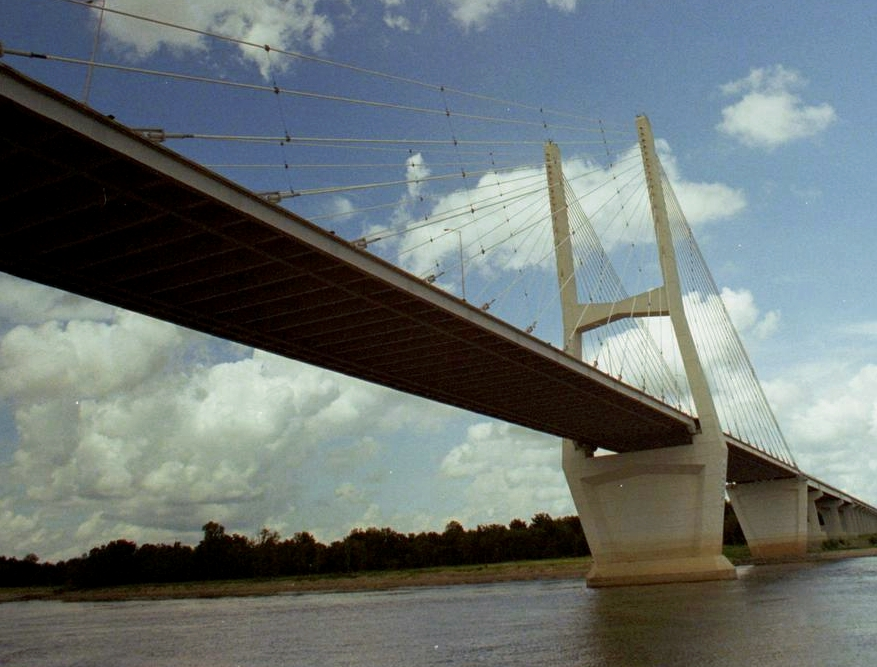
View of the Greenville Bridge from the Mississippi River.

The Greenville Bridge opened to traffic on August 4, 2010, sixteen years after the initial developing stage began in 1994. The entire cost of the bridge totaled $336 million. In 2011, the massive process of removing the old bridge by cutting it into small sections to be recycled was begun and was expected to be completed by September 2012. At times, the river has been closed to traffic to aid the demolition. The job was dangerous and at least two workers died during the demolition.

== See also ==
- List of crossings of the Lower Mississippi River
- Charles W. Dean Bridge
