= Shives, Arkansas =

- Unincorporated community
- Location within Arkansas Location within the United States
- Coordinates: 33°16′31″N 91°10′15″W
- Country: United States
- State: Arkansas
- County: Chicot
- Elevation: 121 ft (37 m)
- Time zone: UTC-6 (Central (CST))
  - Summer (DST): UTC-5 (CDT)
- GNIS feature ID: 58620

Shives (also Shrives) is an unincorporated community in Chicot County, Arkansas, United States.

Shives is located on the southeast shore of Lake Chicot, approximately 1 mi (1.6 km) west of the Mississippi River.

U.S. Route 278 passes through Shives, and Shives is the first settlement west of the Greenville Bridge.
