= Battle of Old River Lake =

1864 battle of the American Civil War

Coordinates: 33°16′6.77″N 91°11′33.73″W

- Part of the American Civil War
| Date | June 5–6, 1864 |
| Location | Chicot County, Arkansas |
| Result | Slight Union victory |

Belligerents
| United States | Confederate States |

Commanders and leaders
| (United States) Joseph Mower | (Confederate States of America) Colton Greene |

Strength
| 6,000 | 800 |

Casualties and losses
| 180 | 100 |

The Battle of Old River Lake, also known as Ditch Bayou, Furlough, and Fish Bayou, was a small skirmish between U.S. Army troops and Confederate troops from June 5 to June 6, 1864, during the American Civil War. A Union Army force marched into Confederate-held lands in Chicot County, Arkansas. The ensuing battle resulted mainly in a stalemate, each side achieving its goals. The Confederate troops succeeded in delaying the Federal forces' advance into the South, while dealing more casualties to the opposing army than they themselves received. Likewise, the Union troops succeeded in advancing toward their goal, Lake Village.

== Battle ==
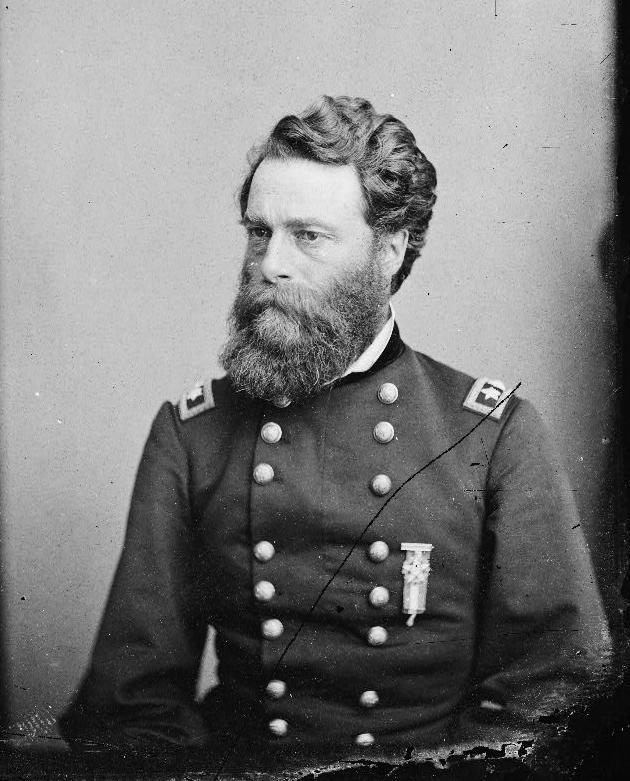
General Joseph A. Mower

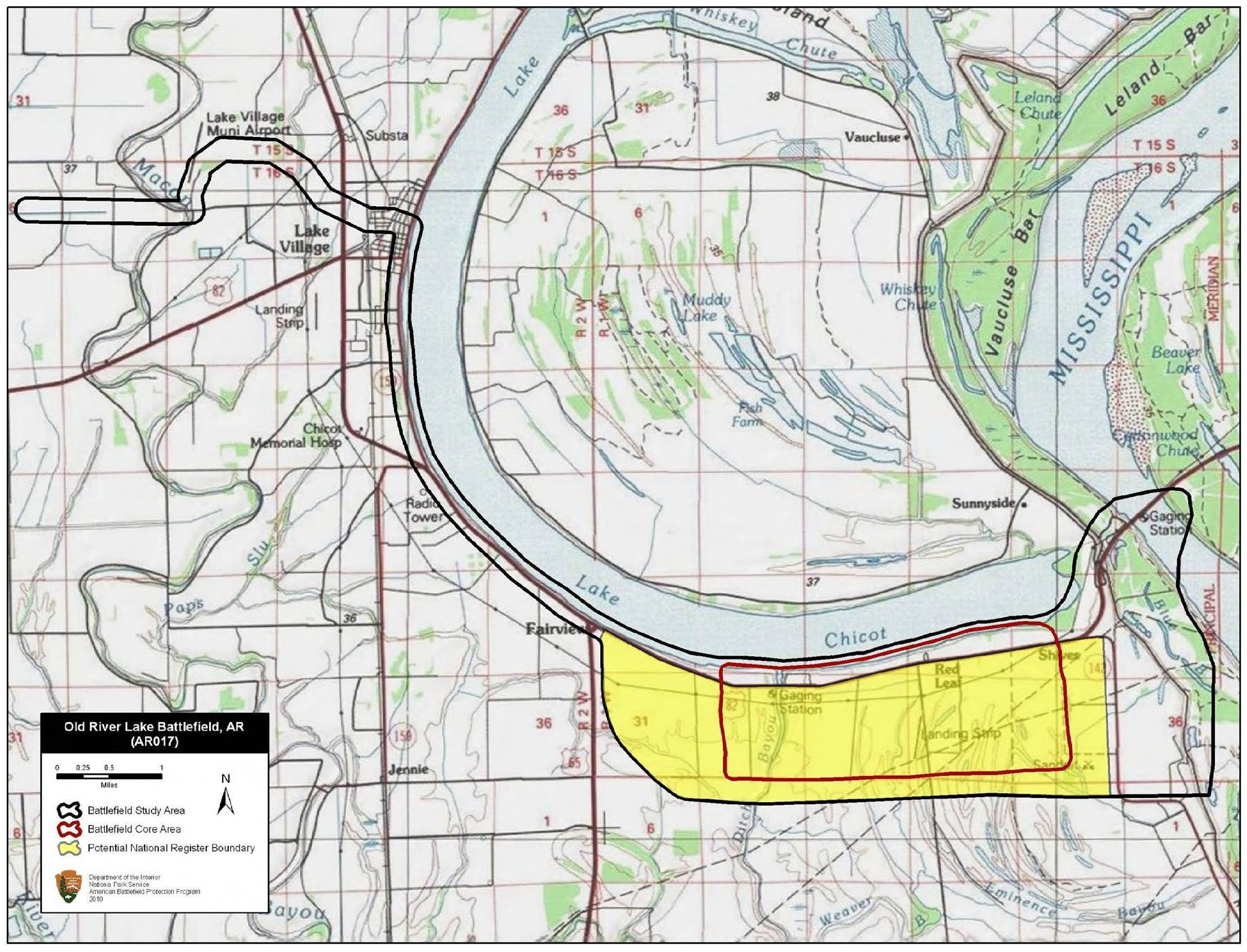
Map of Old River Lake Battlefield core and study areas by the American Battlefield Protection Program.

The Confederate objective was to delay the Federal advance. Although they had no real hope of defeating the Federal forces in a major battle, by using small scale skirmishing techniques, they were able to slowly inflict casualties on the Union Army. Using these skirmishing techniques, the Confederates attempted to delay the Union advance toward Lake Village. In early June, Brigadier General Joseph Mower received orders from Maj. Gen. Andrew J. Smith to show, through a forceful demonstration, the Federals' intentions toward Lake Village.

During the evening and morning of June 5 and 6, Mower positioned his troops in the standard marching formation and proceeded to march on Lake Village. They were soon confronted by Confederate soldiers who would fire a few shots and retreat to cover. Later, these retreating soldiers ended up in General Colton Greene's encampment where his main force was located. Along with Greene's troops and accompanying artillery, the Confederates attempted to delay the Federal advance, then ended the battle and withdrew to Parker's Landing. The Union troops advanced to Lake Village, camped there overnight, and the next day rejoined the flotilla on the Mississippi River at Columbia. Although the Confederates had been able to delay the Federal forces, the U.S. troops still made it to their objective.

== Original Reports ==
- Engagement on Old River Lake: Reports 1-14
