= Lakeside High School (Lake Village, Arkansas) =

Location
- 1100 South Lakeshore; Lake Village, Arkansas 71653; United States; 33°19′30″N 91°18′38″W

Information
- School type: Public comprehensive
- Status: Open
- School district: Lakeside School District
- CEEB code: 041345
- NCES School ID: 050864000578
- Principal: Linda Armour
- Teaching staff: 29.44 (on FTE basis)
- Grades: 9–12
- Enrollment: 268 (2023–2024)
- Student to teacher ratio: 9.10
- Education system: ADE Smart Core
- Classes offered: Regular, Advanced Placement (AP)
- Colors: Cardinal red and white
- Athletics: Football, Basketball, Tennis, Baseball, Track, Soccer, Cheer
- Athletics conference: 3A Region 8 (2012–14)
- Mascot: Beaver
- Team name: Lakeside Beavers
- Accreditation: ADE
- Feeder schools: Lakeside Middle School (6–8)
- Website: www.lakesidesd.org/22790_4

Lakeside High School is an accredited public high school in Chicot County, Arkansas, United States. It is located on Highway 82 just west of Lake Village. Within the state, the school is referred to as Lake Village or Lakeside Lake Village high school to distinguish itself from Lakeside High School in Hot Springs.

Lakeside High School is administered by Lakeside School District and serves roughly 400 students in ninth, tenth, eleventh and twelfth grade.

== Academics ==
The assumed course of study follows the Smart Core curriculum developed by the Arkansas Department of Education (ADE). Students complete regular (core and elective) and career focus courses and exams and may select Advanced Placement (AP) coursework and exams.

Lake Village is accredited by the ADE and is a charter member and accredited by AdvancED since 1924.

== Athletics ==
The Lakeside High School mascot and athletic emblem is a beaver, with school colors of maroon and white.

For 2012–14, the Lakeside Beavers compete in interscholastic sporting activities within the 3A Classification from the 3A Region 8 Conference administered by the Arkansas Activities Association. The Beavers participate in football, soccer (boys only), basketball (boys/girls), tennis (boys/girls), baseball, and track (boys/girls).

== Notable alumni ==
- Lamar McHan (1949)—American football player; 1975 inductee, Arkansas Sports Hall of Fame.
