= Montrose, Arkansas =

- City
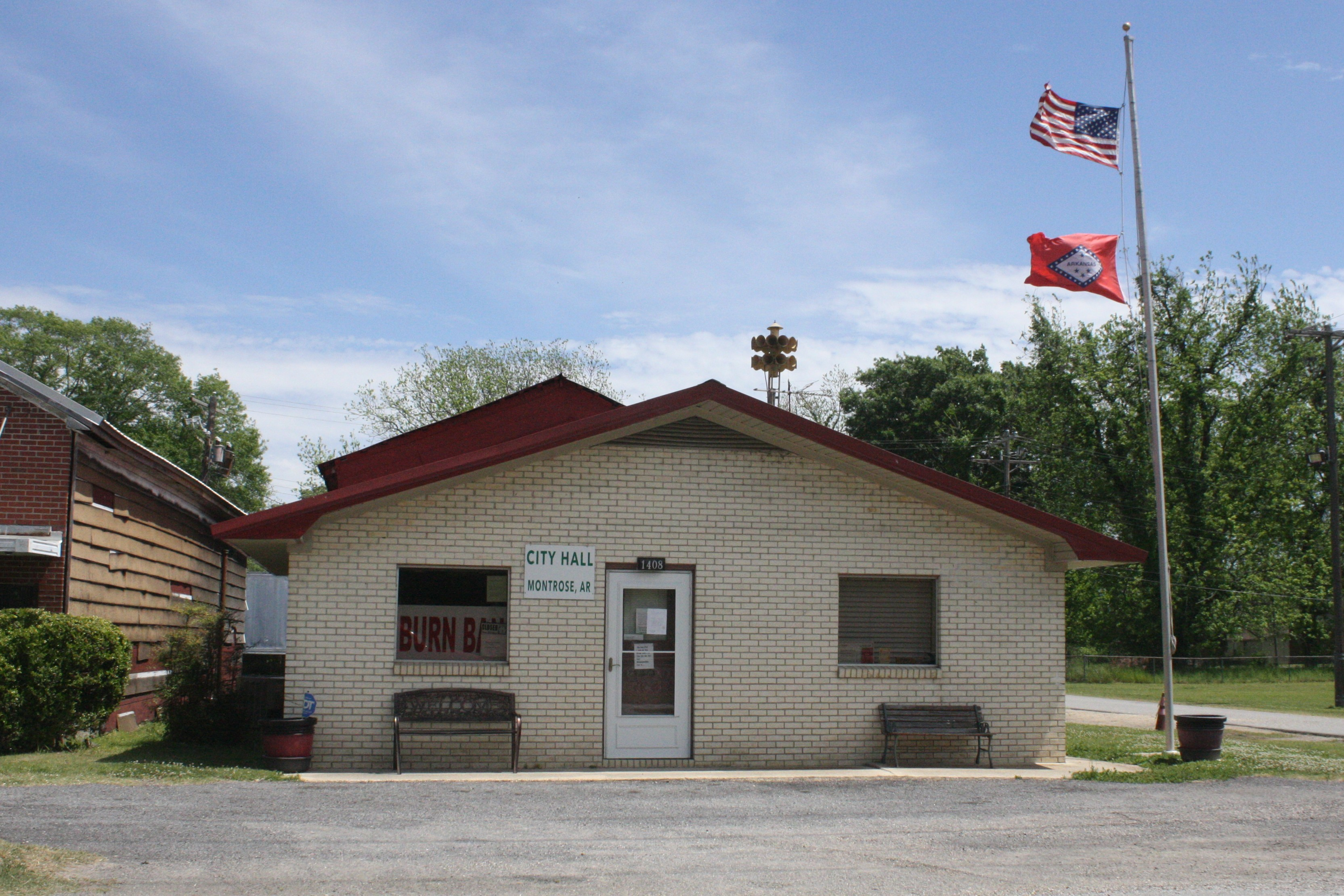
- Montrose City Hall

- Location of Montrose in Ashley County, Arkansas.
- Coordinates: 33°17′57″N 91°29′55″W
- Country: United States
- State: Arkansas
- County: Ashley

Area
  - Total: 0.38 sq mi (0.98 km^{2})
  - Land: 0.38 sq mi (0.98 km^{2})
  - Water: 0 sq mi (0.00 km^{2})
- Elevation: 125 ft (38 m)

Population (2020)
  - Total: 243
  - Estimate (2025): 227 ▼
  - Density: 641.9/sq mi (247.83/km^{2})
- Time zone: UTC-6 (Central (CST))
  - Summer (DST): UTC-5 (CDT)
- ZIP code: 71658
- Area code: 870
- FIPS code: 05-46670
- GNIS feature ID: 2404294
- Website: www.cityofmontrose.net

Montrose is a city in Ashley County, Arkansas, United States. As of the 2020 census, Montrose had a population of 243. Montrose is located where U.S. Route 165 intersects with U.S. Route 82. The town was heavily damaged by an EF2 tornado on January 2, 2023.

== Geography ==
According to the United States Census Bureau, the city has a total area of 0.46 square miles (1.2 km^{2}), all land.

== Demographics ==
Historical population
Census	Pop.	Note	%±
1920	404		—
1930	431		6.7%
1940	343		−20.4%
1950	344		0.3%
1960	399		16.0%
1970	558		39.8%
1980	641		14.9%
1990	528		−17.6%
2000	526		−0.4%
2010	354		−32.7%
2020	243		−31.4%
2025 (est.)	227	▼	−6.6%
U.S. Decennial Census

=== Racial and ethnic composition ===
Montrose city, Arkansas – Racial and ethnic composition Note: the US Census treats Hispanic/Latino as an ethnic category. This table excludes Latinos from the racial categories and assigns them to a separate category. Hispanics/Latinos may be of any race.
Race / Ethnicity (NH = Non-Hispanic)	Pop 2000	Pop 2010	Pop 2020	% 2000	% 2010	% 2020
White alone (NH)	138	107	45	26.24%	30.23%	18.52%
Black or African American alone (NH)	377	223	174	71.67%	62.99%	71.60%
Native American or Alaska Native alone (NH)	0	1	0	0.00%	0.28%	0.00%
Asian alone (NH)	0	0	1	0.00%	0.00%	0.41%
Native Hawaiian or Pacific Islander alone (NH)	0	0	0	0.00%	0.00%	0.00%
Other race alone (NH)	0	0	0	0.00%	0.00%	0.00%
Mixed race or Multiracial (NH)	1	1	7	0.19%	0.28%	2.88%
Hispanic or Latino (any race)	10	22	16	1.90%	6.21%	6.58%
Total	526	354	243	100.00%	100.00%	100.00%

=== 2020 census ===
As of the 2020 United States census, there were 243 people, 152 households, and 113 families residing in the city.

=== 2000 census ===
As of the census of 2000, there were 526 people, 188 households, and 129 families residing in the city. The population density was 1,141.2 inhabitants per square mile (440.6/km^{2}). There were 220 housing units at an average density of 477.3 per square mile (184.3/km^{2}). The racial makeup of the city was 26.24% White, 71.86% Black or African American, 1.71% from other races, and 0.19% from two or more races. 1.90% of the population were Hispanic or Latino of any race.

There were 188 households, out of which 36.2% had children under the age of 18 living with them, 45.7% were married couples living together, 17.6% had a female householder with no husband present, and 30.9% were non-families. 27.7% of all households were made up of individuals, and 13.3% had someone living alone who was 65 years of age or older. The average household size was 2.80 and the average family size was 3.45.

In the city, the population was spread out, with 32.3% under the age of 18, 9.1% from 18 to 24, 27.4% from 25 to 44, 19.4% from 45 to 64, and 11.8% who were 65 years of age or older. The median age was 33 years. For every 100 females, there were 91.3 males. For every 100 females age 18 and over, there were 86.4 males.

The median income for a household in the city was $20,625, and the median income for a family was $22,361. Males had a median income of $24,688 versus $15,536 for females. The per capita income for the city was $10,363. About 30.4% of families and 34.9% of the population were below the poverty line, including 51.0% of those under age 18 and 28.8% of those age 65 or over.

== Education ==
It is in the Lakeside School District.

== Notable people ==
Helen Corrothers, Criminal Justice Professional
