= Eudora School District (Arkansas) =

Defunct school district in Arkansas, United States

Eudora School District was a school district based in Eudora, Arkansas. Its schools were G. C. Johns Lower Elementary School, G. C. Johns Upper Elementary School, and Eudora High School.

On July 1, 1985, the Ross Van Ness School District consolidated into the Eudora district. On February 13, 2006, the Eudora district consolidated into the Lakeside School District. The Eudora district was consolidated under the Omnibus act.
