= Benjamin G. Humphreys Bridge =

Former highway bridge over the Mississippi River

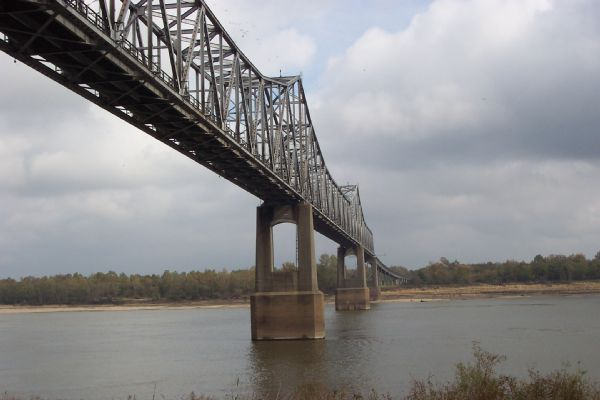
- A photo of the bridge taken from the Arkansas side.
- Coordinates: 33°17′37″N 91°09′34″W
- Carries: Formerly 2 lanes of US 82 / US 278
- Crosses: Mississippi River
- Locale: Lake Village, Arkansas and Greenville, Mississippi
- ID number: 0000000000M1536

Characteristics
- Design: Cantilever bridge
- Total length: 9,957 feet (3,035 m)
- Width: 24 feet (7 m)
- Longest span: 840 feet (256 m)
- Clearance below: 130 feet (40 m)

History
- Opened: October 4, 1940
- Closed: July 28, 2010

Location
- Interactive map of Benjamin G. Humphreys Bridge

The Benjamin G. Humphreys Bridge was a two-lane cantilevered truss bridge carrying U.S. Route 82/U.S. Route 278 across the Mississippi River between Lake Village, Arkansas and Greenville, Mississippi. It was the first bridge to connect the two towns. The bridge was named for Benjamin G. Humphreys II, a former United States Congressman from Greenville.

Hailed as progressive when it opened in 1940, it became functionally obsolete as vehicle and river traffic increased. Because of its narrow two lanes with no shoulders, the bridge often became blocked by accidents or by the crossing of large vehicles like farm equipment. Due to its location near a sharp bend in the Mississippi River, the bridge became a hazard to river traffic; barges and towboats frequently collided with it. In 1994, a study concluded that a new bridge was needed and the old one should be torn down.

In 2010, a new bridge, the Greenville Bridge, was opened as a replacement further downriver from the sharp bend. In 2011, work began to remove the Benjamin G. Humphreys Bridge.

== Description ==
The Benjamin G. Humphreys Bridge, very modern in its time, was a two lane, steel cantilevered truss bridge that carried US 82/278 over the Mississippi River, and connected the towns of Lake Village, Arkansas and Greenville, Mississippi by road for the first time. Prior to the bridge, local vehicles and local freight could only cross the river by ferry. It was named after Benjamin G. Humphreys, a US Congressman from Greenville who co-authored a flood control bill in 1917, establishing a national flood control program on the Mississippi and promoted the concept of flood control to contain the river.

The bridge opened on October 4, 1940, to great fanfare. Its main span width was 840 feet (260 m), the highway bridge with the longest span on the Mississippi River. The width of the roadway was 24 feet (7.3 m)—two lanes of 12 feet (3.7 m) each with no shoulders.

Both the original bridge and its replacement are geographically mostly in Arkansas, as the state lines were determined prior to the shift west of the Mississippi River.

== History ==
In the late 1930s, talk started on the construction of a bridge to cross the Mississippi River at Greenville. In 1936, a group called the Arkansas-Mississippi-Alabama US 82 Association was formed to raise funds for the bridge. In 1937, Milton C. Smith (the mayor at that time) worked with John A. Fox, (the secretary of the Washington County Chamber of Commerce), to get Congress to pass a law authorizing the bridge. The bill authorizing the bridge was signed into law in August 1937 by President Franklin D. Roosevelt. In 1938, Smith applied for money from the Works Progress Administration to fund the estimated $4.5 million it would take to build the bridge. The Works Progress Administration agreed to the proposal in September 1938 and construction started on the bridge a few months later.

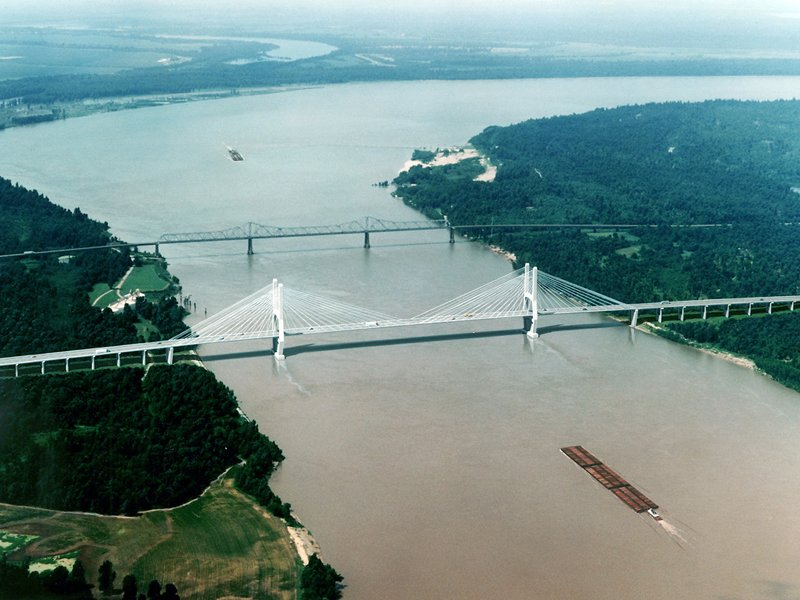
3-D artistic prototype of the new bridge with the Benjamin G. Humphreys Bridge and the sharp bend in the Mississippi River in the background

The Benjamin G. Humphreys Bridge was built by the company now known as HNTB and opened to much fanfare in 1940 as the "pathway to progress" for the Mississippi Delta. It was a through-truss design and had a span of 840 feet (260 meters). Until 1943, this was the longest bridge for vehicles on the Mississippi River. Over time, the bridge supported increasing volumes of highway traffic and vehicles hitting the bridge. In the 1950s, an Air Force plane crashed into the bridge. Though the bridge remained structurally sound, it was becoming functionally obsolete. It had only two narrow highway lanes and no shoulders. An accident or the crossing of very large vehicles such as a large combine could force the bridge to close.

With river traffic increasing, damage from barge collisions increased. By 1972, the Greenville Bridge was hit more times by barges than any other bridge on the Mississippi. The bridge was located close to a sharp bend in the Mississippi; towboats and barges had difficulty making the sharp turn and regaining their course in time to avoid a collision with the bridge. Over the years many have not been able to make the turn quickly and have hit it. The bridge had become a danger to river traffic.

A 1994 engineering study by the Mississippi Department of Transportation explored alternatives to upgrading the crossing of US 82 and issued a report that explored a four-lane crossing at Greenville. It concluded the best of several alternatives it identified was to build a new bridge 0.5 miles (0.80 km) downriver from the old one and to remove the old bridge. Additional studies evaluated the type of bridge to build, and by 1995, the cable-stayed bridge was chosen as the best design to fit the river and soil conditions, as well as providing sufficient clearance for river navigation. Engineering plans were completed in 1999 for the Greenville Bridge, its replacement.

== Destruction ==
The new Greenville Bridge opened to traffic on August 4, 2010. In 2011, the massive process of removing the old bridge by cutting into small sections to be recycled was begun and was completed in September 2012. At times the river was closed to traffic to aid the demolition. Two workers died during the demolition.

== See also ==
- List of crossings of the Lower Mississippi River
