= Lake Chicot State Park =

State park in Arkansas, United States

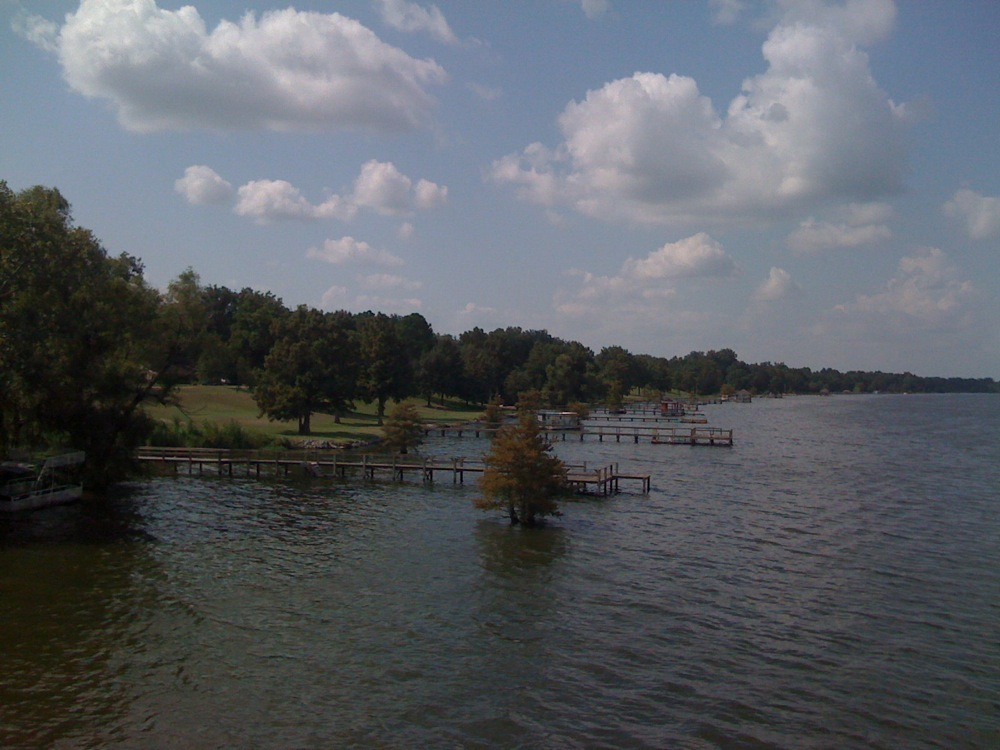
- Lake Chicot

- Location within Arkansas Location within the United States
- Interactive map of Lake Chicot State Park
- Location: Chicot County, Arkansas, United States
- Coordinates: 33°22′19″N 91°11′45″W
- Area: 211.6 acres (85.6 ha)
- Established: 1957
- Administrator: Arkansas Department of Parks, Heritage and Tourism
- Website: Official website
- Arkansas State Parks

Lake Chicot State Park is a 211.6 acres (85.6 ha) Arkansas state park in Chicot County, Arkansas within the Arkansas Delta. The park is located along Lake Chicot, Arkansas, a 22 miles (35 km) oxbow lake that was formerly the main channel of the Mississippi River. The lake, formerly a polluted eyesore for the area, has been restored to its current condition through the cooperation of many agencies to return its natural, cultural and recreational value. As the state's largest natural lake and the largest oxbow lake in the United States, Lake Chicot State Park features unique fishing and camping opportunities among large cypress trees, creating a bayou environment for both wildlife and visitors.

== Description ==
Nestled in a pecan grove, the park offers 122 campsites (39 Class AAA, 16 Class AA, and 67 Class B including several sites with Class C options), 14 cabins with kitchens (many with fireplace, lake view patio and fishing dock), a swimming pool (open in summer), picnicking, standard pavilions (screened), laundry and playground. The park operates a combination store/marina which offers food, gifts, fuel and bait for sale and also rents boats, motors and personal water craft and operates a launch ramp. The visitor center features interpretive exhibits that tell of the area's history and natural resources and also rents bicycles.
