= Lake Chicot, Arkansas =

Lake in Arkansas, United States

Lake Chicot
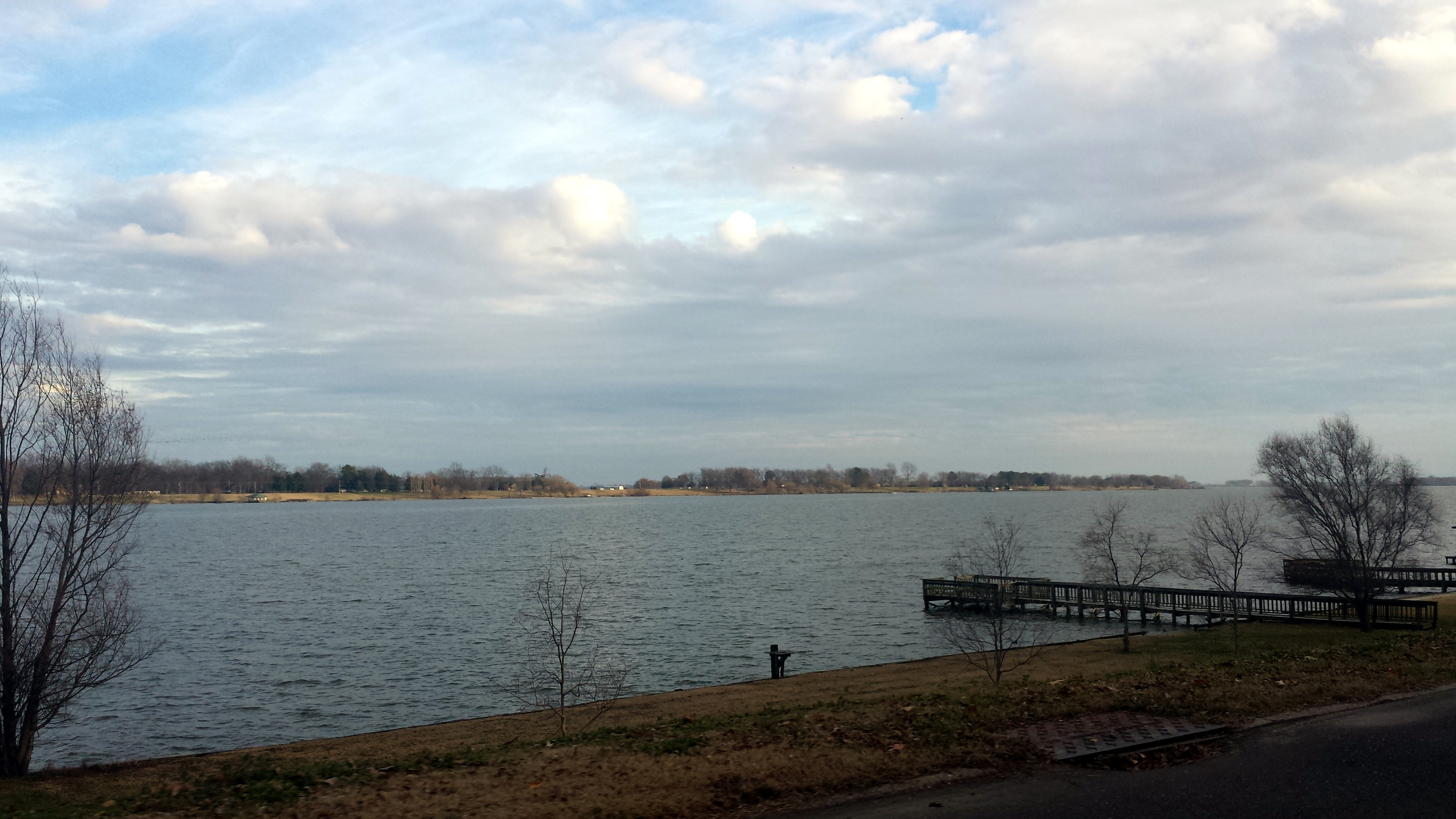
- Lake Chicot from Lake Village, Arkansas

- Location within Arkansas Location within the United States
- Location: Chicot County, Arkansas
- Coordinates: 33°19′21″N 91°16′42″W
- Type: Oxbow lake
- Basin countries: United States
- Surface elevation: 105 ft (32 m)

Lake Chicot (/ˈʃiːkoʊ/ SHE-ko) is a lake adjacent to the Mississippi River. The lake is located on the east side of Lake Village, Arkansas in Chicot County. It is the largest oxbow lake in North America, as well as the largest natural lake in Arkansas.

The name Chicot, French for "stumpy," refers to the many cypress stumps and trees along the lake banks. The lake is approximately 0.75 miles (1.21 km) wide and 21–22 miles (34–35 km) long from end to end.

The Arkansas Department of Parks and Tourism operates Lake Chicot State Park on the northern end of the lake, which includes fishing, boating, and camping facilities, as well as a wildlife museum. Chicot County also operates a county park on the eastern side of the lake across from Lake Village.

== Activities ==
Fishing

When the dam at Cornerly Bayou was destroyed in a flood in 1927, silt and mud came pouring into the southern end of the lake. The pollution of the southern part of the lake eventually killed off the bass population. The upper part of the lake was protected by a dam, so it remained clean and protected. In 1968, the Arkansas Game and Fish Commission, U.S. Army Corps of Engineers, and Chicot County Rural Development Authority began to restore Lake Chicot to its original state. The groups decided to drain the water off the polluted section of the lake to compress sediment on the bottom, and plant vegetation that would provide a stable environment for fish species. The southern part of Lake Chicot was restocked, and has become a stable ecosystem. Fish species that can be caught in the lake include: bluegills, channel catfish, largemouth bass, hybrid striper bass, crappie, redear sunfish, and bream.

Boating

Lake Chicot State Park contains a marina and boat launches at Lake Chicot Park, Jack R. Rhodes Lake Front Park in downtown Lake Village, and the Chicot County Park.

Lake Chicot State Park

The park contains bottomland hardwoods and intersects the Mississippi Flyway. Visitors engage in hiking, camping, boating, and birdwatching. There are 122 campsites and 14 cabins located in Lake Chicot State Park.

== History ==
In the 1820s, the land around Lake Chicot (also known as "Old River Lake") began to be filled with American settlers. At this time, cotton farms worked by slaves were common in the land surrounding the lake. One particular cotton plantation of note was the Sunnyside Plantation, located on the shores of Lake Chicot. Sunnyside was created in the 1830s, and became the home of an Italian immigrant colony. In the mid 1800s Chicot County's population was 9,234, and of that number 7,512 were slaves.

The biggest Civil War battle in Chicot County was fought on June 6, 1864 on the shores of Lake Chicot. In the Battle of Old River Lake, Union and Confederate soldiers engaged in battle on the southern shore of the lake. The Union eventually won the battle. By moving the Confederates out of the Mississippi River, travel became much safer and easier. This was considered one of Arkansas' final Civil War battles.
