= Chicot County, Arkansas =

County in Arkansas, United States

- County
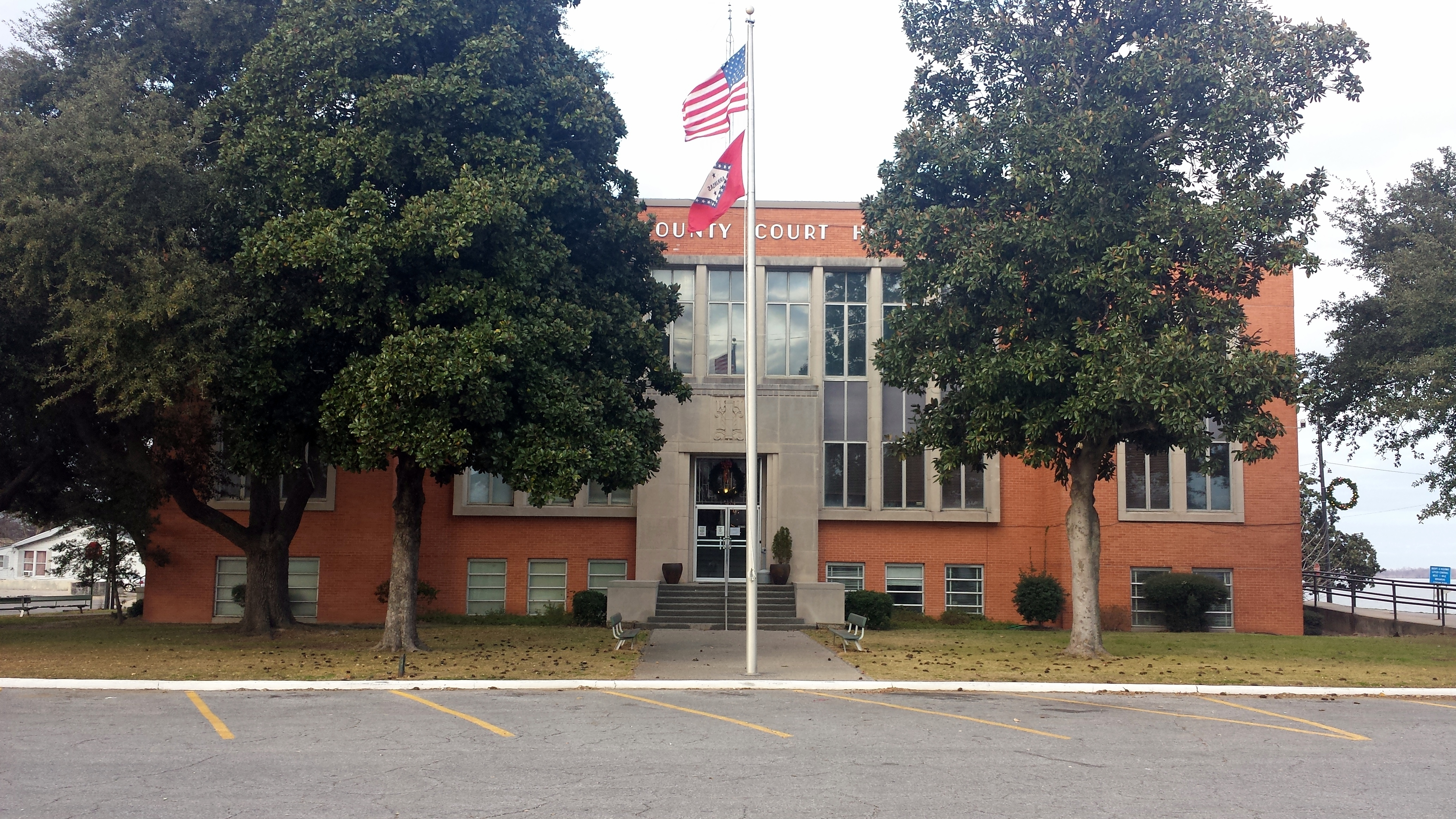
- Chicot County Courthouse in Lake Village

- Location within the U.S. state of Arkansas
- Coordinates: 33°17′53″N 91°16′30″W
- Country: United States
- State: Arkansas
- Founded: October 25, 1823
- Seat: Lake Village
- Largest city: Dermott

Government
  - Sheriff: Ronald Nichols

Area
  - Total: 691 sq mi (1,790 km^{2})
  - Land: 644 sq mi (1,670 km^{2})
  - Water: 47 sq mi (120 km^{2}) 6.7%

Population (2020)
  - Total: 10,208
  - Estimate (2025): 9,107 ▼
  - Density: 15.9/sq mi (6.12/km^{2})
- Time zone: UTC−6 (Central)
  - Summer (DST): UTC−5 (CDT)
- Congressional district: 1st
- Website: www.arcounties.org/counties/chicot/

Chicot County (/ˈʃiːkoʊ/ SHEE-koh) is a county located in the southeastern corner of the U.S. state of Arkansas. As of the 2020 census, the population was 10,208. The county seat is Lake Village. Chicot County is Arkansas's 10th county, formed on October 25, 1823, and named after Point Chicot on the Mississippi River. It is part of the Arkansas Delta, lowlands along the river that have been historically important as an area for large-scale cotton cultivation. Landmarks around the county include Lake Chicot, Arkansas, North America's largest oxbow lake and Arkansas's largest natural lake; the site of Charles Lindbergh's first night-time flight; and the legendary burial site of Hernando De Soto, near Lake Village.

== History ==
Spanish explorer Hernando de Soto came to this area with his expedition in 1542, settling for a time in the village or territory known as Guachoya. The European-American town of Lake Village later developed in the 19th century at Lake Chicot, formed by an oxbow of the Mississippi River. Eighteenth-century French colonists named it Chicot because of the many cypress trees in the waterways. The word is translated to "stumpy, or knobby".

The area along the Mississippi River and major tributaries was developed as cotton plantations, the major commodity crop before and after the American Civil War of 1861–1865. Enslaved African Americans formed the labor force, comprising a majority of the population in the antebellum years. Major large cotton plantations included Sunnyside (owned in the 20th century by LeRoy Percy, planter and US Senator from Greenville, Mississippi); Florence, Patria, Pastoria, Luna, and Lakeport.

On February 14, 1864, 13 Black Union soldiers of the 1st Mississippi Volunteer Infantry (African Descent) were ambushed and killed at the Tecumseh plantation near Ross's Landing by Confederate guerillas of the 9th Missouri Cavalry. Union and Confederate forces fought at the Battle of Old River Lake from June 5 to 6, 1864.

The population of the rural county has declined since its peak in 1940. Earlier in the century, boll weevils threatened the cotton crop, and many African Americans left in the Great Migration for opportunity in northern and midwestern industrial cities. In addition, mechanization of agriculture and consolidation into industrial-style farms has reduced the need for farm labor.

== Geography ==
According to the U.S. Census Bureau, the county has a total area of 691 square miles (1,790 km^{2}), of which 644 square miles (1,670 km^{2}) is land and 47 square miles (120 km^{2}) (6.7%) is water.

=== Major highways ===
- U.S. Highway 65
- U.S. Highway 82
- U.S. Highway 165
- U.S. Highway 278
- Highway 8
- Highway 35
- Highway 52
- Highway 142
- Highway 144
- Highway 159
- Highway 160
- Highway 208
- Highway 209
- Highway 257
- Highway 293
- Highway 922
- Highway 980

=== Adjacent counties ===
- Desha County (north)
- Bolivar County, Mississippi (northeast)
- Washington County, Mississippi (east)
- Issaquena County, Mississippi (southeast)
- East Carroll Parish, Louisiana (south)
- West Carroll Parish, Louisiana (south)
- Morehouse Parish, Louisiana (southwest)
- Ashley County (west)
- Drew County (northwest)

== Demographics ==
Historical population
Census	Pop.	Note	%±
1830	1,165		—
1840	3,806		226.7%
1850	5,115		34.4%
1860	9,234		80.5%
1870	7,214		−21.9%
1880	10,117		40.2%
1890	11,419		12.9%
1900	14,528		27.2%
1910	21,987		51.3%
1920	21,749		−1.1%
1930	22,646		4.1%
1940	27,452		21.2%
1950	22,306		−18.7%
1960	18,990		−14.9%
1970	18,164		−4.3%
1980	17,793		−2.0%
1990	15,713		−11.7%
2000	14,117		−10.2%
2010	11,800		−16.4%
2020	10,208		−13.5%
2025 (est.)	9,107	▼	−10.8%
U.S. Decennial Census; 1790–1960 1900–1990; 1990–2000 2010

=== Racial and ethnic composition ===
Chicot County, Arkansas – Racial and ethnic composition Note: the US Census treats Hispanic/Latino as an ethnic category. This table excludes Latinos from the racial categories and assigns them to a separate category. Hispanics/Latinos may be of any race.
Race / Ethnicity (NH = Non-Hispanic)	Pop 1980	Pop 1990	Pop 2000	Pop 2010	Pop 2020	% 1980	% 1990	% 2000	% 2010	% 2020
White alone (NH)	8,160	6,666	5,980	4,761	3,887	45.86%	42.42%	42.36%	40.35%	38.08%
Black or African American alone (NH)	9,275	8,811	7,541	6,347	5,387	52.13%	56.07%	53.42%	53.79%	52.77%
Native American or Alaska Native alone (NH)	17	22	16	23	26	0.10%	0.14%	0.11%	0.19%	0.25%
Asian alone (NH)	115	54	55	53	38	0.65%	0.34%	0.39%	0.45%	0.37%
Native Hawaiian or Pacific Islander alone (NH)	x	x	2	3	9	x	x	0.01%	0.03%	0.09%
Other race alone (NH)	11	1	7	6	25	0.06%	0.01%	0.05%	0.05%	0.24%
Mixed race or Multiracial (NH)	x	x	109	65	255	x	x	0.77%	0.55%	2.50%
Hispanic or Latino (any race)	215	159	407	542	581	1.21%	1.01%	2.88%	4.59%	5.69%
Total	17,793	15,713	14,117	11,800	10,208	100.00%	100.00%	100.00%	100.00%	100.00%

=== 2020 census ===
As of the 2020 census, the county had a population of 10,208. The median age was 44.5 years. 21.6% of residents were under the age of 18 and 21.4% of residents were 65 years of age or older. For every 100 females there were 103.9 males, and for every 100 females age 18 and over there were 100.6 males age 18 and over.

The racial makeup of the county was 38.7% White, 53.1% Black or African American, 0.4% American Indian and Alaska Native, 0.4% Asian, 0.1% Native Hawaiian and Pacific Islander, 4.1% from some other race, and 3.3% from two or more races. Hispanic or Latino residents of any race comprised 5.7% of the population.

Less than 0.1% of residents lived in urban areas, while 100.0% lived in rural areas.

There were 4,142 households in the county, of which 27.6% had children under the age of 18 living in them. Of all households, 34.1% were married-couple households, 21.6% were households with a male householder and no spouse or partner present, and 39.8% were households with a female householder and no spouse or partner present. About 36.4% of all households were made up of individuals and 16.9% had someone living alone who was 65 years of age or older.

There were 5,104 housing units, of which 18.8% were vacant. Among occupied housing units, 64.1% were owner-occupied and 35.9% were renter-occupied. The homeowner vacancy rate was 3.4% and the rental vacancy rate was 11.1%.

=== 2010 census ===
As of the 2010 census, there were 11,800 people living in the county. 54.1% were Black or African American, 41.2% White, 0.5% Asian, 0.2% Native American, 3.2% of some other race and 0.8 of two or more races. 4.6% were Hispanic or Latino (of any race).

=== 2000 census ===
As of the 2000 census, there were 14,117 people, 5,205 households, and 3,643 families living in the county. The population density was 22 people per square mile (8.5 people/km^{2}). There were 5,974 housing units at an average density of 9 units per square mile (3.5 units/km^{2}). The racial makeup of the county was 53.96% Black or African American, 43.24% White, 0.13% Native American, 0.40% Asian, 0.02% Pacific Islander, 1.41% from other races, and 0.85% from two or more races. 2.88% of the population were Hispanic or Latino of any race.

There were 5,205 households, out of which 31.70% had children under the age of 18 living with them, 43.70% were married couples living together, 22.00% had a female householder with no husband present, and 30.00% were non-families. 26.90% of all households were made up of individuals, and 13.00% had someone living alone who was 65 years of age or older. The average household size was 2.58 and the average family size was 3.12.

In the county, the population was spread out, with 27.50% under the age of 18, 8.60% from 18 to 24, 26.40% from 25 to 44, 22.20% from 45 to 64, and 15.40% who were 65 years of age or older. The median age was 36 years. For every 100 females there were 94.20 males. For every 100 females age 18 and over, there were 89.90 males.

The median income for a household in the county was $22,024, and the median income for a family was $27,960. Males had a median income of $25,899 versus $17,115 for females. The per capita income for the county was $12,825. About 23.10% of families and 28.60% of the population were below the poverty line, including 38.30% of those under age 18 and 20.70% of those age 65 or over.

Since 1940, the population of the county has collapsed. Press reports indicate that in 2013, the largest settlement in the county, Lake Village, Arkansas had two bank branches, two pharmacies, some law firms, two dollar stores, a grocery store, and no retail shops.

== Government and politics ==
=== Government ===
The county government is a constitutional body granted specific powers by the Constitution of Arkansas and the Arkansas Code. The quorum court is the legislative branch of the county government and controls all spending and revenue collection. Representatives are called justices of the peace and are elected from county districts every even-numbered year. The number of districts in a county vary from nine to fifteen, and district boundaries are drawn by the county election commission. The Chicot County Quorum Court has nine members. Presiding over quorum court meetings is the county judge, who serves as the chief operating officer of the county. The county judge is elected at-large and does not vote in quorum court business, although capable of vetoing quorum court decisions.

Chicot County, Arkansas Elected countywide officials
Position	Officeholder	Party
County Judge	Tom Mosley	Democratic
County Clerk	Alexandria Manning-Ewing	Democratic
Circuit Clerk	Josephine Taylor-Griffin	Democratic
Sheriff	Ronald Nichols	Democratic
Treasurer	Shanna Hayes	Independent
Collector	Jolecia Manning	Democratic
Assessor	Faye Tate	Democratic
Coroner	Skyler King	Democratic

The composition of the Quorum Court following the 2024 elections is 5 Democrats, 3 Republicans, and 1 Independent. Justices of the Peace (members) of the Quorum Court following the elections are:

- District 1: Theodore Brown (D)
- District 2: Clinton Hampton (D)
- District 3: Michael Mencer (R)
- District 4: Jeraldine Tucker (D)
- District 5: Dale Scrivner (R)
- District 6: Mark Pieroni (D)
- District 7: Ralph Jones (R)
- District 8: Danita Baker Turner (D)
- District 9: Dr. Terri McCullough (I)

Additionally, the townships of Chicot County are entitled to elect their own respective constables, as set forth by the Constitution of Arkansas. Constables are largely of historical significance as they were used to keep the peace in rural areas when travel was more difficult. The township constables as of the 2024 elections are:

- Bowie: Jimmy Head (D)
- Carlton: Reginald Dixon (D)
- Planters: James Cathey (D)

=== Politics ===
The county voters have traditionally supported the Democratic Party. In the 20th century, the only Democratic presidential candidate to lose the county was George McGovern in 1972. In modern times, the margins have shrunk in this county due to depopulation and the state's intense swing rightward. The county is part of Arkansas's 1st congressional district. In the Arkansas Senate, the county is in the 1st District and is represented by Republican Bart Hester. In the Arkansas House of Representatives, it is in District 1 and represented by Republican Mark McElroy. The county supported a measure prohibiting "co-habiting couples" from adopting.

United States presidential election results for Chicot County, Arkansas
Year	Republican		Democratic		Third party(ies)	
Year	No.	%	No.	%	No.	%
1836	51	54.26%	43	45.74%	0	0.00%
1840	191	81.62%	43	18.38%	0	0.00%
1844	210	57.07%	158	42.93%	0	0.00%
1848	146	57.03%	110	42.97%	0	0.00%
1852	85	41.87%	118	58.13%	0	0.00%
1856	0	0.00%	165	51.24%	157	48.76%
1860	0	0.00%	28	5.47%	484	94.53%
1868	920	86.14%	148	13.86%	0	0.00%
1872	1,658	85.82%	274	14.18%	0	0.00%
1876	1,512	75.60%	488	24.40%	0	0.00%
1880	1,552	85.37%	266	14.63%	0	0.00%
1884	1,171	90.49%	123	9.51%	0	0.00%
1888	1,621	88.48%	211	11.52%	0	0.00%
1892	685	63.37%	361	33.40%	35	3.24%
1896	258	33.95%	418	55.00%	84	11.05%
1900	430	60.31%	269	37.73%	14	1.96%
1904	496	47.46%	549	52.54%	0	0.00%
1908	644	59.25%	438	40.29%	5	0.46%
1912	89	10.62%	419	50.00%	330	39.38%
1916	474	45.40%	570	54.60%	0	0.00%
1920	489	35.28%	887	64.00%	10	0.72%
1924	325	30.95%	708	67.43%	17	1.62%
1928	445	30.31%	1,021	69.55%	2	0.14%
1932	98	5.51%	1,680	94.38%	2	0.11%
1936	75	6.14%	1,145	93.78%	1	0.08%
1940	161	9.17%	1,592	90.71%	2	0.11%
1944	270	14.79%	1,552	84.99%	4	0.22%
1948	203	11.52%	952	54.03%	607	34.45%
1952	1,191	32.51%	2,458	67.10%	14	0.38%
1956	1,043	30.19%	2,273	65.79%	139	4.02%
1960	979	32.09%	1,803	59.10%	269	8.82%
1964	1,972	40.22%	2,916	59.47%	15	0.31%
1968	865	15.32%	2,595	45.95%	2,187	38.73%
1972	2,858	65.96%	1,469	33.90%	6	0.14%
1976	1,621	29.50%	3,868	70.39%	6	0.11%
1980	2,239	38.76%	3,445	59.64%	92	1.59%
1984	2,502	42.21%	3,407	57.48%	18	0.30%
1988	1,901	43.74%	2,426	55.82%	19	0.44%
1992	1,242	24.36%	3,504	68.72%	353	6.92%
1996	1,056	24.01%	3,090	70.26%	252	5.73%
2000	1,564	35.13%	2,820	63.34%	68	1.53%
2004	1,725	36.26%	2,993	62.92%	39	0.82%
2008	2,119	40.69%	3,043	58.43%	46	0.88%
2012	1,670	38.29%	2,649	60.74%	42	0.96%
2016	1,716	41.09%	2,350	56.27%	110	2.63%
2020	1,752	42.70%	2,260	55.08%	91	2.22%
2024	1,658	47.51%	1,796	51.46%	36	1.03%

== Communities ==
=== Cities ===
- Dermott
- Eudora
- Lake Village (county seat)

=== Unincorporated communities ===
- Arkla
- Bellaire
- Cosgrove
- Chicot Junction
- Farmwood
- Grand Lake
- Hudspeth
- Jennie
- Lakehall
- Luna
- McMillian Corner
- Readland
- Ross Van Ness
- Shives
- Stuart Island
- Wellford

=== Ghost towns ===
- Columbia
- Eunice
- Gaines Landing

=== Townships ===
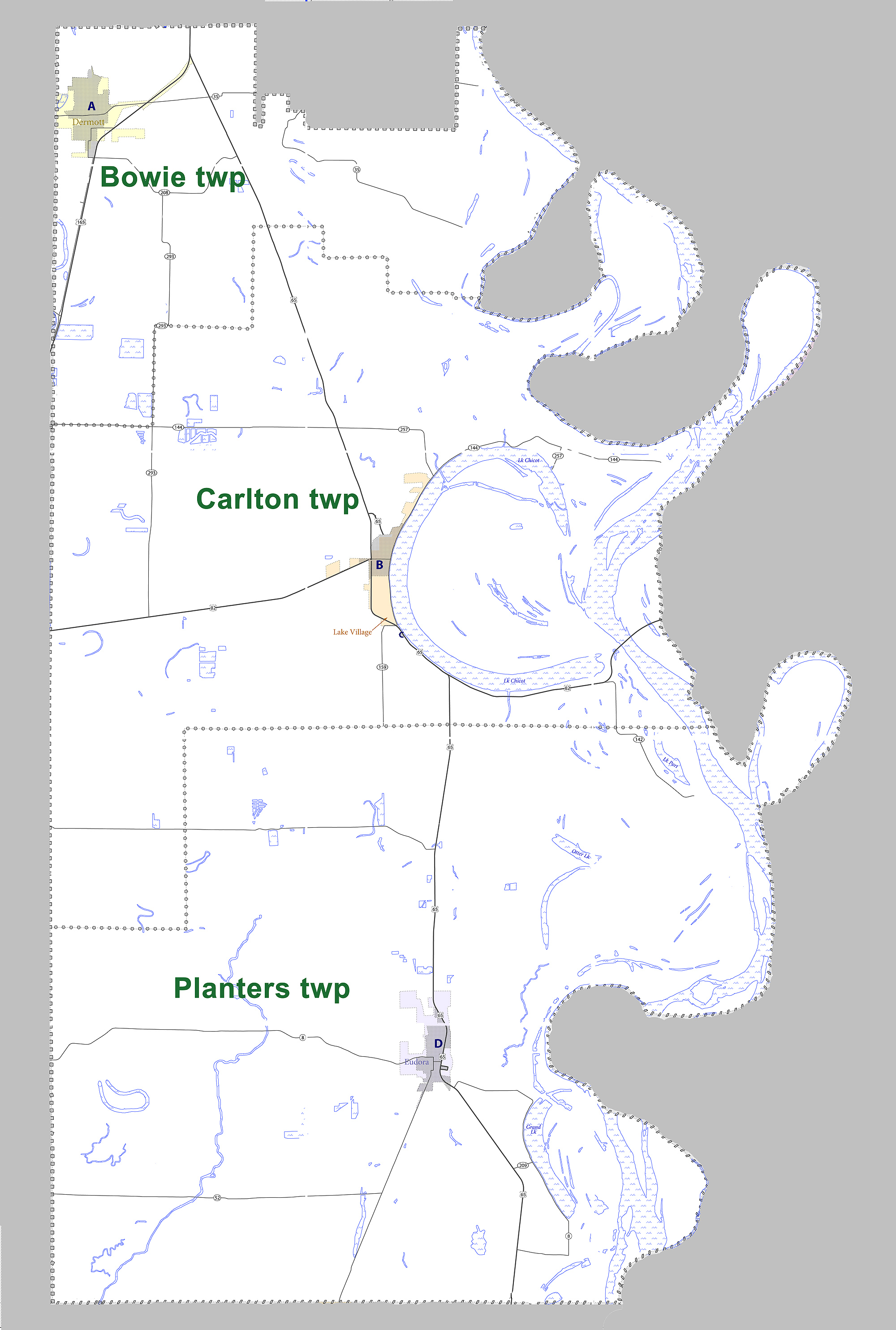
Townships in Chicot County, Arkansas as of 2010

Townships in Arkansas are the divisions of a county. Each township includes unincorporated areas; some may have incorporated cities or towns within part of their boundaries. Arkansas townships have limited purposes in modern times. However, the United States census does list Arkansas population based on townships (sometimes referred to as "county subdivisions" or "minor civil divisions"). Townships are also of value for historical purposes in terms of genealogical research. Each town or city is within one or more townships in an Arkansas county based on census maps and publications. The townships of Chicot County are listed below; listed in parentheses are the cities, towns, and/or census-designated places that are fully or partially inside the township.

- Bowie (Dermott)
- Carlton (Lake Village)
- Planters (Eudora)

== Notable people ==
- Larry D. Alexander- Visual artist, writer, Bible teacher
- Jim Cain - American player of gridiron football
- Ruby Grant Martin - lawyer, federal civil rights official
- Robert L. Hill - founder of the Progressive Farmers and Household Union of America
- Mark D. McElroy - State representative for Chicot County since 2013; resides in Desha County
- Lycurgus Johnson, the owner of the Lakeport Plantation, later a state congressman.

== See also ==
- List of lakes in Chicot County, Arkansas
- National Register of Historic Places listings in Chicot County, Arkansas
