= U.S. Route 82 =

Highway in the United States

U.S. Route 82
- US 82 highlighted in red

Route information
- Length: 1,625 mi (2,615 km)
- Existed: July 1, 1931–present

Major junctions
- West end: US 54 / US 70 at Alamogordo, NM
- I-27 / US 87 at Lubbock, TX; I-35 / US 77 at Gainesville, TX; I-30 near New Boston, TX; I-49 in Texarkana, AR; I-55 at Winona, MS; I-20 / I-59 at Tuscaloosa, AL; I-65 from Prattville, AL to Montgomery, AL; I-85 at Montgomery, AL; US 80 near Montgomery, AL; I-75 at Tifton, GA
- East end: I-95 / US 17 / SR 25 / SR 520 at Brunswick, GA

Location
- Country: United States
- States: New Mexico, Texas, Arkansas, Mississippi, Alabama, Georgia

Highway system
- United States Numbered Highway System; List; Special; Divided
← US 81	→ US 83

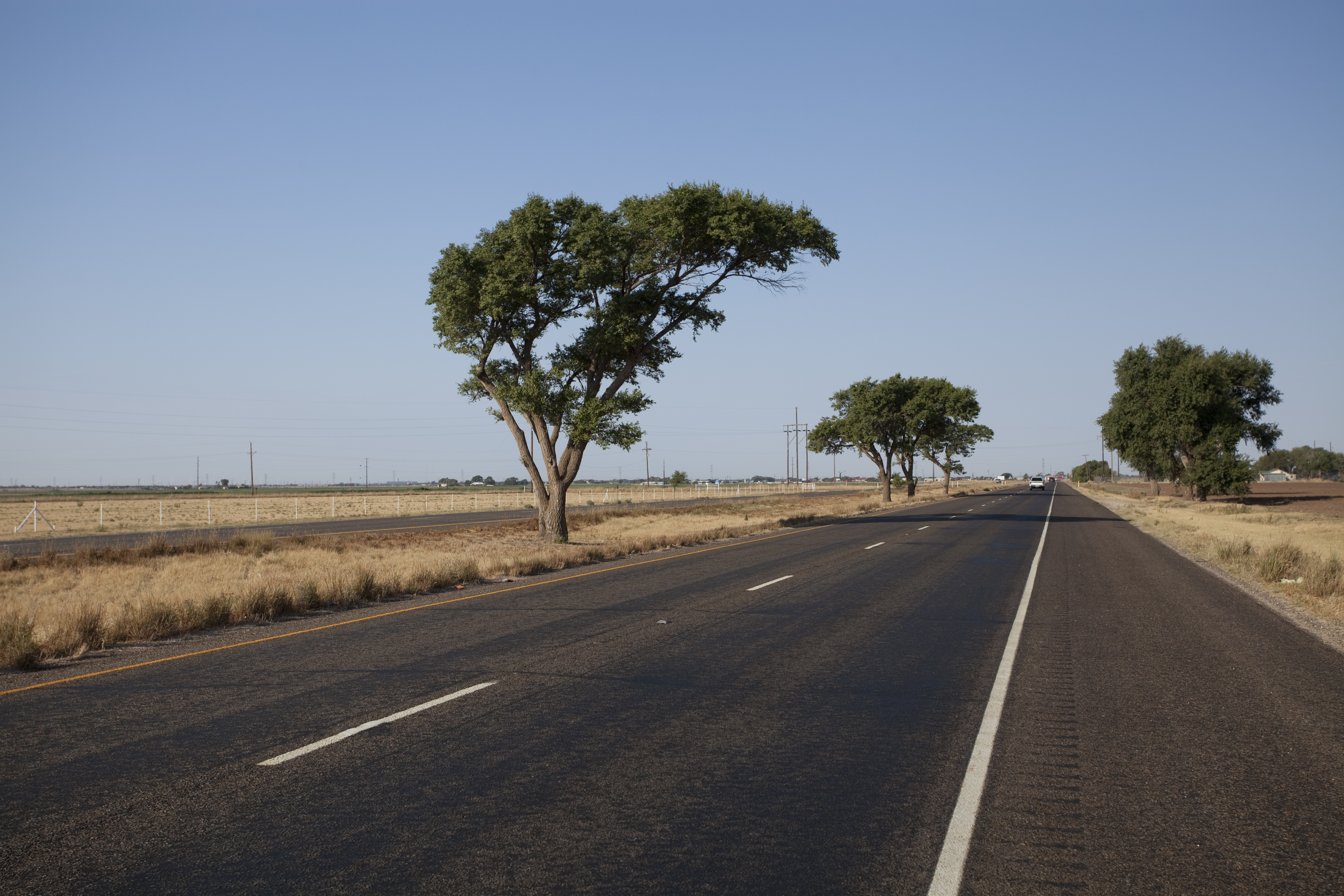
US Highway 82 crossing the high plains of the Llano Estacado of West Texas

U.S. Route 82 (US 82) is an east–west United States highway in the Southern United States. Created on July 1, 1931 across central Mississippi and southern Arkansas, US 82 eventually became a 1,625-mile-long (2,615 km) route extending from the White Sands of New Mexico to Georgia's Atlantic coast.

The highway's eastern terminus is in Brunswick, Georgia, at an interchange with Interstate 95. It is co-signed for its last 1/2 mile (800 m) with U.S. Route 17. Its western terminus is in Alamogordo, New Mexico at an intersection with U.S. Route 54 and U.S. Route 70.

== Route description ==
=== New Mexico ===
US 82 begins at an intersection with US highways 54 and 70 north of Alamogordo, and south of La Luz, New Mexico. Heading east out of Alamogordo the road ascends into the Sacramento Mountains, traveling through the Lincoln National Forest. While climbing steep Mexican Canyon, the highway passes the abandoned railroad trestles of the El Paso and Northeastern Railway, and passes through the only road tunnel in New Mexico. The road then traverses the New Mexico villages of High Rolls, Cloudcroft, and Mayhill After descending the mountains into the rugged, flat plains of eastern New Mexico, it generally follows a north-northeasterly bearing until Artesia, where it takes a more due-easterly bearing on through to Lovington, veering back slightly to the north before crossing into Texas.

=== Texas ===
US 82 crosses into Texas from New Mexico at Texas Farm to Market Road 769, turning northeastward toward Plains, where it merges with US 380. US 82 is co-signed with US 380 from Plains to Brownfield, where it joins US 62, and US 380 leaves the route. US 82/62 continues northeastward toward Lubbock.

In Lubbock, US 82 and US 62 split, where US 82 is a limited access freeway west of US Route 87. From Wolfforth to downtown Lubbock, US 82 is named Marsha Sharp Freeway after Marsha Sharp, former head basketball coach of the Texas Tech Lady Raiders and Women's Basketball Hall of Fame inductee. It once again merges with US 62 (along with State Highway 114) east of the campus of Texas Tech University, where it continues eastward through Ralls, where US 62 makes a sharp turn to the north and leaves the route. US 82 continues eastward across the level plains of the Llano Estacado to Crosbyton and then dips downward as it crosses the White River of Blanco Canyon, where the Texas Department of Transportation maintains the Silver Falls Rest Area with facilities and hiking trails. After climbing out of Blanco Canyon, US 82 eventually exits the Llano Estacado and enters the rolling plains near Dickens, Texas.

US 82/SH 114 continues eastward as a co-signed route until Seymour, where it merges with U.S. Highways 183, 277 and 283, with US 183 and 283 leaving the route at Mabelle. US 82/277 continues eastward to Wichita Falls, merging with US 287 just south of downtown. US 82 leaves US 287 at Henrietta and continues east, signed independently (apart from various state highway routes) across the remainder of Texas, crossing into Arkansas in downtown Texarkana.

=== Arkansas ===
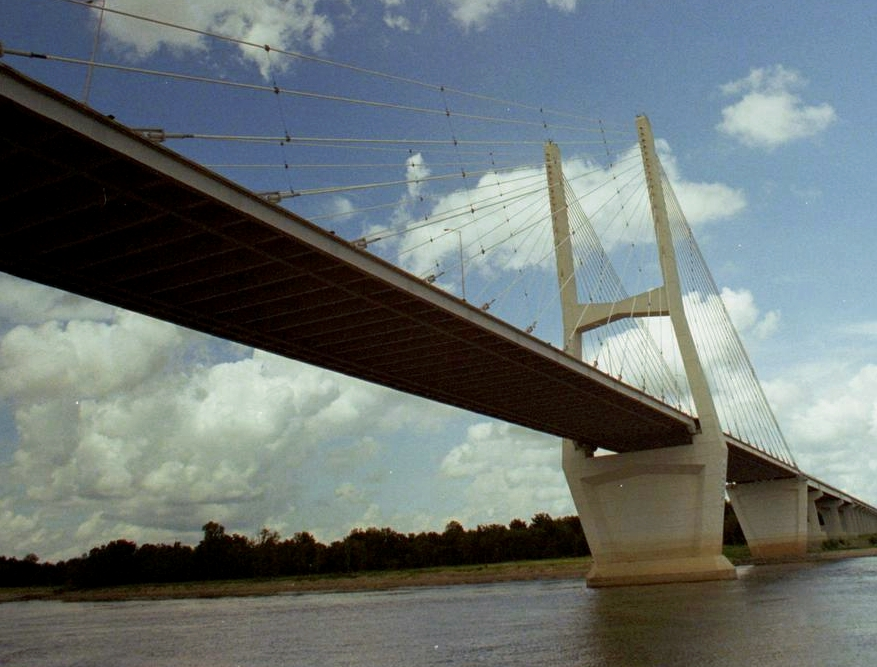
The Greenville Bridge over the Mississippi River between Arkansas and Mississippi

US 82 enters Arkansas in downtown Texarkana, then proceeds almost due east across the flat plains of the Red River. It crosses the Red River at Garland City on a new bridge, then passes through the towns of Lewisville and Magnolia. At Magnolia the route joins US 79 for approximately two miles before continuing eastward. U.S. Route 82 is proposed to cross Interstate 69 in the future. Next, US 82 passes through the cities of El Dorado and Strong before crossing the Ouachita River just north of Lake Jack Lee, then continues through Crossett and Hamburg to Lake Village. The route continues from there across the Mississippi River to Greenville, MS. US 82 closely follows the historical alignment of Arkansas Highway 2.

=== Mississippi ===
Through the entire state, the highway is four-laned with interchanges at major junctions. After crossing the Mississippi River from Arkansas via a four-laned, cable-stayed Mississippi River bridge, the road bypasses Greenville, then continues east to Columbus, passing through Indianola, Greenwood, Winona, and Starkville, while bypassing the core of Itta Bena.

From Starkville east through Columbus and on to the Alabama state line, US 82 is built to freeway standards.

=== Alabama ===
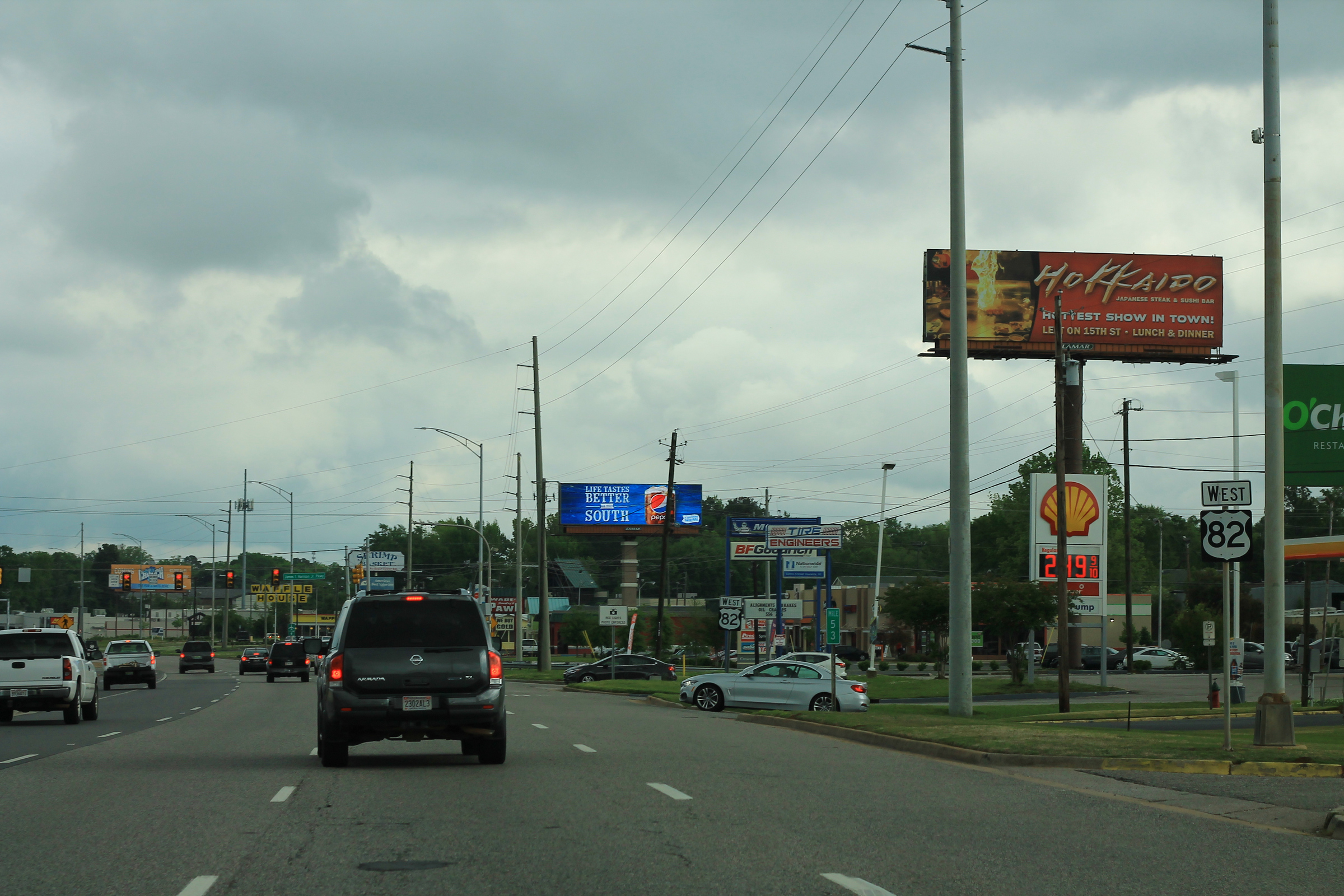
McFarland Boulevard (US 82 West) in Tuscaloosa, Alabama in 2018

Throughout Alabama, US 82 is paired with unsigned State Route 6 (SR 6). The highway enters the state east of Columbus, Mississippi, and bears southeast towards Northport and Tuscaloosa, where it crosses over I-20 and I-59 south of town. It is known in West Alabama as McFarland Boulevard, in memory of Ward Wharton McFarland, a political, business, and civic leader who died in 1979. After leaving Tuscaloosa, the route continues southeast, passing through the cities of Brent, Centreville, and Maplesville en route to Prattville, on the northern edge of the Montgomery metropolitan area. This approximately 92-mile (148 km) drive goes through some of the most rural areas of the state, much of it two lanes with the exception of the section from Tuscaloosa to Centreville. Upon arriving in Prattville, it runs concurrently with I-65, with which it goes through downtown Montgomery with (also junctioning with the current southern terminus of I-85), and splits off to the east south of downtown. After leaving Montgomery, the route continues southeast through Union Springs and Midway en route to Eufaula, on the Alabama–Georgia state line, where it junctions with US 431. The route then crosses over the Chattahoochee River into Georgetown, Georgia, over Lake Eufaula.

Currently in Pickens County, Alabama, a widening project of US 82 is underway to make the highway four lanes. New bridges are being constructed using Federal Highway Administration monies, as well as matching Alabama Department of Transportation funds. Four-laning the highway in Tuscaloosa County, west of Northport to the Pickens County line, was completed in the fall of 2010. The highway is now four lanes from the Mississippi state line to just southeast of Centreville at mile marker 88, with the exception of a short two lane stretch from Gordo to the Tuscaloosa County line.

=== Georgia ===
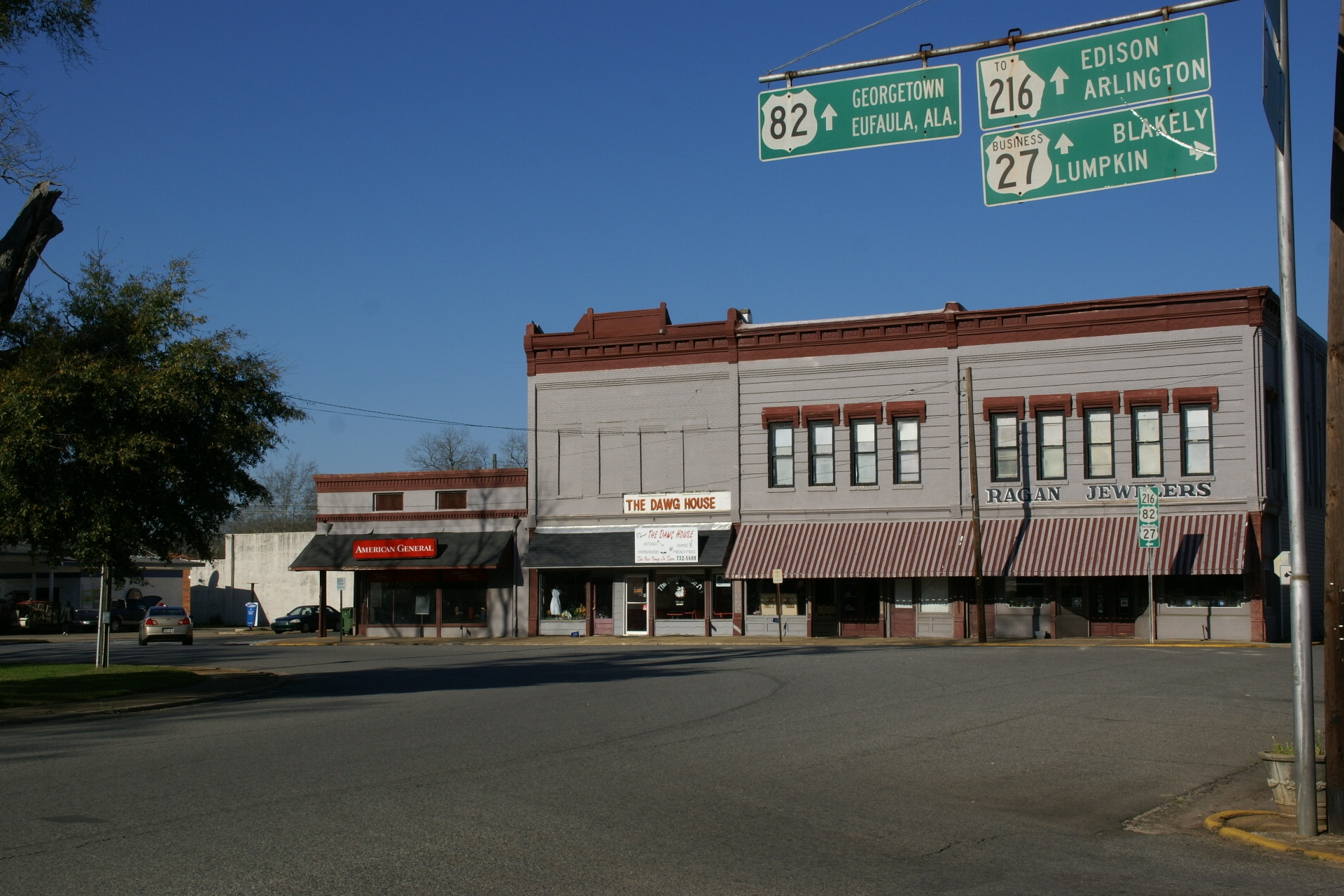
US 82 at the intersection with US 27 Bus. at Main Square in Cuthbert

US 82 is a 232-mile-long (373 km) U.S. Highway in the U.S. state of Georgia.

Throughout much of southern Georgia, US 82 is paired with State Route 520 and designated as "Corridor Z" and "South Georgia Parkway." West of Dawson, US 82 is paired with State Route 50, the historic State Route number for US 82 in Georgia. From Dawson onwards, US 82 becomes a four-lane highway as it moves through Albany and then onto Tifton where US 82 intersects with I-75. After this the highway moves east through southern plains and Waycross, near the Okefenokee Swamp. US 82 then proceeds to Brunswick, where it terminates at the intersection with I-95.

== History ==
During the initial creation of the US Highway System, the US 82 designation was unassigned. The Mississippi Highway Department requested the creation of a route between Greenville and Columbus, additionally proposing that it should be extended eastward to Birmingham, Alabama, and into Arkansas. The American Association of State Highway Officials (AASHO) initially balked at the request because it was not accompanied by concurrent requests from Arkansas or Alabama, and because the proposed route utilized several private toll bridges. Following concurrence from Arkansas, the route was approved on July 1, 1931. In Arkansas, US 82 completely replaced State Road 2, running from the Mississippi River to US 71 in Texarkana. US 82 was extended east into Alabama and west into Texas in 1934; making US 82 a 946-mile (1,522 km) route from US 385 in Lubbock to US 11 in Tuscaloosa. Over the next eight years, construction and other routing improvements reduced the total length to 904-mile (1,455 km). In 1948, the route was extended east to Waycross, Georgia, with an extension northeast to US 17 in Midway, Georgia eight years later.

On November 26, 1960, an extension to Las Cruces, New Mexico, was denied due to substandard roadway conditions in New Mexico, but the request was later approved on June 18, 1963. The route was extended east to I-95 in Chester, Georgia, on June 25, 1979.

In 1988, Georgia made a request to swap US 82 and US 84 east of Waycross to "provide better directional continuity for both routes". In the same action, the segment of former US 84 east from I-95 to the center of Brunswick (which was co-signed with US 17 and US 341) was considered redundant and removed. A bypass of Waycross was under construction at the time, and the swap also allowed it to carry a single co-designation of US 1, US 23, and US 82.

New Mexico decided to delete an overlap with US 70 between Alamogordo and Las Cruces, resulting in the current western terminus at US 54/US 70.

A bypass around Greenville was constructed. The new road commences at the recently opened Mississippi River Bridge and terminates at the previously U.S. 82 near Leland, creating a half-loop freeway around South Greenville. Cloverleaf interchanges were built at the freeway's junctions with MS 454 and MS 1. The bypass opened to traffic on August 27, 2025.

== Major intersections ==
New Mexico
US 54 / US 70 in Alamogordo
US 285 in Artesia
Texas
US 380 in Plains. The highways travel concurrently to Brownfield.
US 62 / US 385 in Brownfield. US 62/US 81 travels concurrently to Lubbock. US 82/US 385 travels concurrently through Brownfield.
US 84 in Lubbock
I-27 / US 87 in Lubbock
US 62 in Lubbock. The highways travel concurrently to southwest of Ralls.
US 83 south of Guthrie
US 183 / US 277 / US 283 north-northeast of Seymour. US 82/US 183/US 283 travels concurrently to Mabelle. US 82/US 277 travels concurrently to Wichita Falls.
US 277 / US 281 / US 287 in Wichita Falls. US 82/US 281 travels concurrently through Wichita Falls. US 82/US 287 travels concurrently to west of Henrietta.
US 81 in Ringgold
I-35 / US 77 in Gainesville
US 377 in Whitesboro
US 75 in Sherman
US 69 in Bells
US 271 in Paris. The highways travel concurrently through Paris.
US 259 northwest of De Kalb
I-30 west of New Boston
I-369 / US 59 in Texarkana
US 67 in Texarkana. The highways travel concurrently to Texarkana, Arkansas.
US 71 on the Texas–Arkansas state line on the Texarkana–Texarkana, Arkansas city line. The highways travel concurrently to Texarkana, Arkansas.
Arkansas
I-49 in Texarkana
US 371 in Magnolia
US 79 in Magnolia. The highways travel concurrently through Magnolia.
US 63 / US 167 in El Dorado
US 425 east of Crossett. The highways travel concurrently to Hamburg.
US 165 south of Montrose
US 65 / US 278 in Lake Village. US 65/US 82 travels concurrently to Fairview. US 82/US 278 travels concurrently to east of Leland, Mississippi.
Mississippi
US 61 / US 278 east of Leland.
US 49W in Indianola
US 49E in Greenwood. The highways travel concurrently through Greenwood.
I-55 in Winona
US 51 in Winona
US 45 west-southwest of Columbus. The highways travel concurrently to Columbus.
Alabama
US 43 in Northport. The highways travel concurrently through Northport.
I-20 / I-59 in Tuscaloosa
US 11 in Tuscaloosa
US 31 in Prattville
I-65 in Prattville. The highways travel concurrently to Montgomery.
I-85 / Future I-685 in Montgomery
I-65 / US 80 in Montgomery. US 80/US 82 travels concurrently through Montgomery.
US 331 in Montgomery
US 80 / US 231 in Montgomery. US 82/US 231 travels concurrently to south-southeast of Pike Road.
US 29 in Union Springs. The highways travel concurrently through Union Springs.
US 431 in Eufaula. The highways travel concurrently through Eufaula.
Georgia
US 27 east of Cuthbert
US 19 in Albany. The highways travel concurrently through Albany.
I-75 in Tifton
US 319 in Tifton. The highways travel concurrently to east-southeast of Tifton.
US 41 in Tifton
US 129 northwest of Alapaha. The highways travel concurrently to Alapaha.
US 221 / US 441 in Pearson
US 1 / US 23 west of Deenwood. The highways travel concurrently to Waycross.
US 84 in Waycross. The highways travel concurrently through Waycross.
US 301 in Nahunta
US 17 west of Brunswick. The highways travel concurrently for approximately 0.7 miles (1.1 km).
I-95 / US 17 west of Brunswick

== Special routes ==
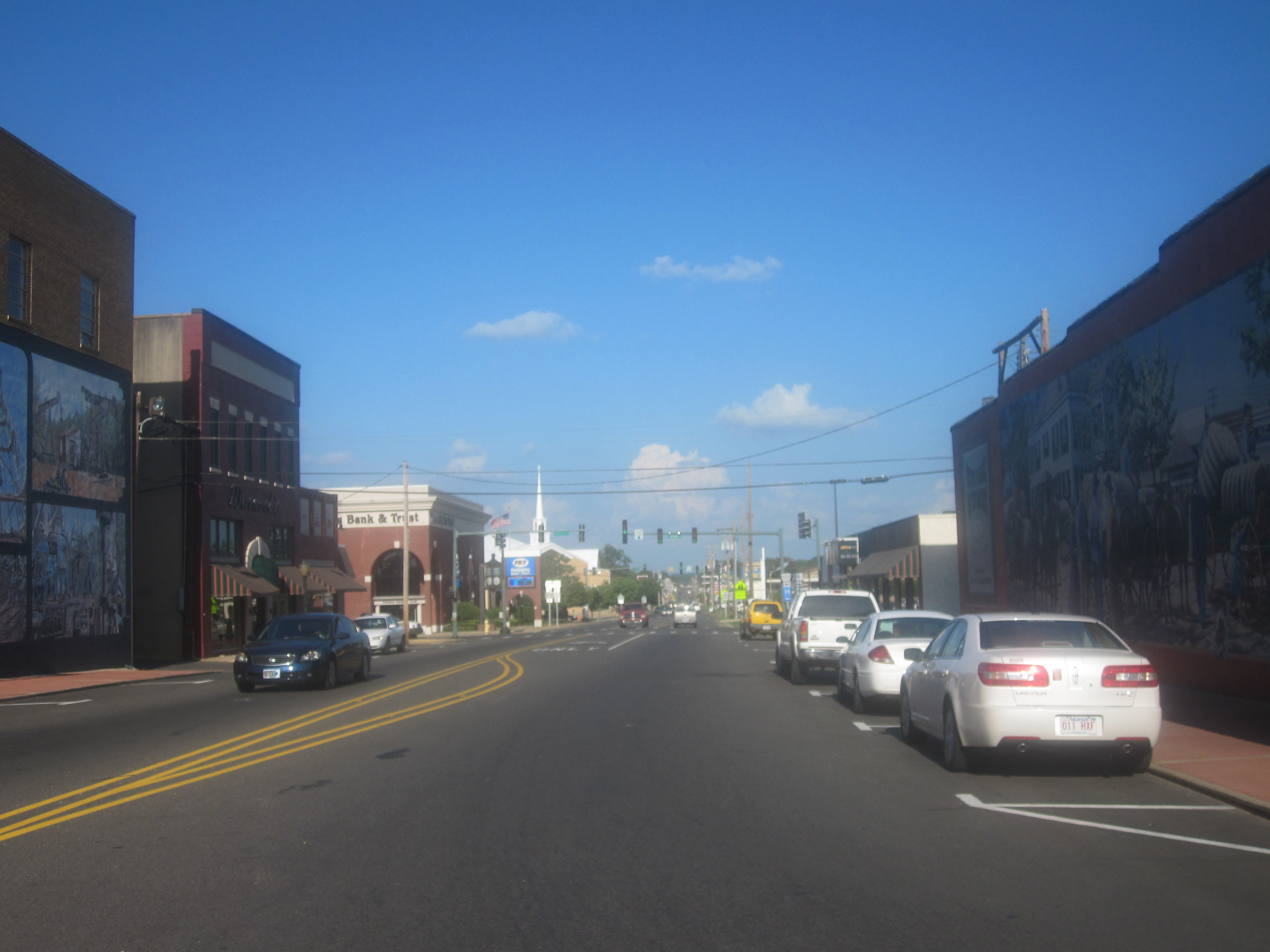
US 82B running as Main Street through the Magnolia Commercial Historic District in Magnolia, Arkansas

Twelve special routes of US 82 currently exist: four in Arkansas, four in Texas, two in New Mexico, one in Mississippi, and one in Georgia.

== See also ==
- Mississippi Highway 182
- Texas State Highway 56

Browse numbered routes
← NM 81	NM	→ NM 83
← SH 81	TX	→ SH 82
← AR 81	AR	→ AR 83
← US 80	MS	→ MS 83
← SR 81	AL	→ SR 83
← SR 81	GA	→ SR 82
