= Bomarton, Texas =

- Unincorporated community
- Location within the state of Texas Bomarton (the United States)
- Coordinates: 33°30′27″N 99°25′34″W
- Country: United States
- State: Texas
- County: Baylor
- Elevation: 1,408 ft (429 m)

Population (2000)
  - Total: 15
- Time zone: UTC-6 (Central (CST))
  - Summer (DST): UTC-5 (CDT)
- GNIS feature ID: 1379439

Bomarton (/ˈboʊmərtən/ BOH-mər-tən) is an unincorporated community located in Baylor County, Texas, United States. According to the Handbook of Texas, the community had a population of 15 in 2000.

== History ==
Bomarton was founded in 1906 when the Wichita Valley Railroad traveled from Seymour to Abilene. Little is known about its namesake W. T. Bomar, except that he was one of the area's earliest residents. A post office was established at Bomarton in 1906 in Tom McClure's store. Another store was eventually run by B.B. Calfee and J.R. Snyder. There were two churches built between 1908 and 1910. Two cotton gins were in operation in 1914. The community's most common amenities were marketing, baseball games, and a large grazing area for cows and their calves. Its population was 580 in 1920, 600 in 1930, and 598 in 1940. It declined once World War II hit. At the end of the decade, its population was recorded as 150 in 1960, 27 in 1980, 23 in 1990, and there were 15 residents at the 2000 census, and it is currently a ghost town. Its population was 23 in 2004.

== Geography ==
Bomarton is located at the intersection of U.S. Highway 277 and Farm to Market Road 1152, 11 miles southwest of Seymour in southwestern Baylor County. It is also located 61 mi (98 km) southwest of Wichita Falls, 13 mi (21 km) northeast of Munday and 2 mi (3.2 km) east of the Knox County line.

== Education ==
Bomarton had its own school in 1907. Today, the community is served by the Seymour Independent School District.
