= Red Springs, Baylor County, Texas =

- Unincorporated community
- Location within Texas Location within the United States
- Coordinates: 33°36′46″N 99°24′43″W
- Country: United States
- State: Texas
- County: Baylor
- Elevation: 1,394 ft (425 m)
- Time zone: UTC-6 (Central (CST))
  - Summer (DST): UTC-5 (CDT)
- Area code: 940
- GNIS feature ID: 1366219

Red Springs is an unincorporated community in Baylor County, in the U.S. state of Texas. According to the Handbook of Texas, the community had a population of 42 in 2000.

== History ==
Red Springs was named for the hot springs that flow from a clay bank of the Salt Fork Brazos River. Native Americans camped in the area and buffalo herds drank water at the springs before a trading post was established in the 1890s. It grew when the Fort Worth and Denver Railway was built at the start of the 20th century. There were four stores and 100 residents in 1940 and remained at that level in 1980. It shrunk to 81 in 1990 and then 42 in 2000.

== Geography ==
Red Springs is located on U.S. Route 82, 10 mi (16 km) west of Seymour in west-central Baylor County.

== Education ==
Red Springs had its own school in 1940. Today, the community is served by the Seymour Independent School District.
