= Westover, Texas =

- Unincorporated community
- Location within Texas Location within the United States
- Coordinates: 33°29′50″N 99°01′04″W
- Country: United States
- State: Texas
- County: Baylor
- Elevation: 1,293 ft (394 m)
- Time zone: UTC-6 (Central (CST))
  - Summer (DST): UTC-5 (CDT)
- Area code: 940
- GNIS feature ID: 1380762

Westover is an unincorporated community in Baylor County, in the U.S. state of Texas. According to the Handbook of Texas, the community had a population of 18 in 2000.

== Geography ==
Westover is located on Texas State Highway 114, 16 mi (26 km) southeast of Seymour in southeastern Baylor County.

== Education ==
Today, the community is served by the Olney Independent School District.
