= George Sims (American football) =

American football player (born 1927)

George "Gabby" Sims
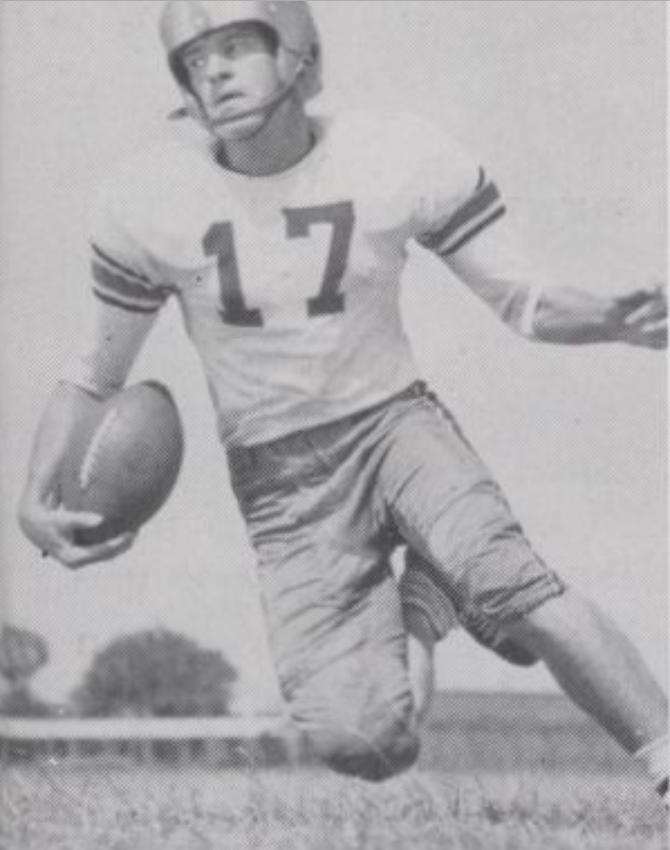
- Sims pictured c. 1949 at Baylor

No. 17
- Position: Defensive back

Personal information
- Born: October 23, 1927 (age 99); Afton, Texas, U.S.
- Listed height: 5 ft 11 in (1.80 m)
- Listed weight: 170 lb (77 kg)

Career information
- High school: Seymour (Seymour, Texas)
- College: Baylor
- NFL draft: 1949: 2nd round, 17th overall pick

Career history
- Los Angeles Rams (1949–1950)

Career NFL statistics
- Interceptions: 10
- Total touchdowns: 1
- Stats at Pro Football Reference

George Pollard "Gabby" Sims Jr. (born October 23, 1927) is an American former professional football player who was a defensive back for the Los Angeles Rams of the National Football League (NFL). He played college football for the Baylor Bears, having previously attended Seymour High School in Seymour, Texas. He is a member of the Baylor University Athletics Hall of Fame.

After enlisting in the Army, Sims played for the Army's Fort Ord Warriors from fall 1951 until he mustered out in 1953. Released by the Rams and the Army to the Dallas Texans, he ended up in camp with the Baltimore Colts in 1953. He was cut by the Colts in September 1953 to reduce their squad to 40 men.

== See also ==
- List of NCAA major college yearly punt and kickoff return leaders
