= Seymour High School (Texas) =

Public school in Texas, United States

Location
- 500 Stadium Drive; Seymour, Baylor County, Texas 76380-1939; United States; 33.592427°N 99.246195°W

Information
- School type: Public, high school
- Locale: Rural: Remote
- School district: Seymour ISD
- NCES School ID: 483978004520
- Principal: Adam Arredondo
- Teaching staff: 17.56 (on an FTE basis)
- Grades: 9–12
- Enrollment: 170 (2023–2024)
- Student to teacher ratio: 9.68
- Colors: Maroon & White
- Athletics conference: UIL Class AA
- Mascot: Panthers/Lady Panthers
- Website: Seymour High School

Seymour High School is a public high school located in Seymour, Texas, United States and classified as a 2A school by the University Interscholastic League (UIL). It is part of the Seymour Independent School District located in central Baylor County. During 2023–2024, Seymour High School had an enrollment of 170 students and a student to teacher ratio of 9.68. The school received an overall rating of "A" from the Texas Education Agency for the 2024–2025 school year.

== Academics ==
- UIL Computer Science Champions -
  - 2000(2A), 2002(2A)

== Athletics ==
The Seymour Panthers compete in these sports -

- Baseball
- Basketball
- Cross Country
- Football
- Golf
- Powerlifting
- Softball
- Tennis
- Track and Field

== Notable alumni ==
- Bobby Plummer, football head coach
- George Sims, former NFL player
