= Whitesboro High =

Coordinates: 33.6616°N 96.9230°W

Whitesboro High School
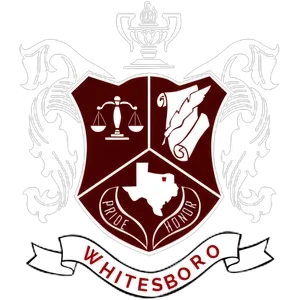

Location
- 1 Bearcat Drive, Whitesboro, TX 76273

Information
- Principal: Jared Messer
- Assistant Principal: Carrie Tucker
- Grades: 9-12
- Student to teacher ratio: 13:1
- Colors: Maroon and Gold
- Mascot: Bearcat
- Nickname: The Boro
- Yearbook: The Oak
- Website: https://hs.whitesboroisd.org/

Whitesboro High School (WHS) is a public high school located in Whitesboro, Texas, and is part of the Whitesboro Independent School District. The school serves students in grades 9 through 12 and participates in academics, athletics, fine arts, and career preparation programs within the state of Texas.

The school's mascot is the Bearcat, and its colors are maroon and gold. Whitesboro High School competes in University Interscholastic League (UIL) activities, including athletics, speech and debate, music, and academic competitions.

== History ==
Whitesboro High School has served the Whitesboro community for generations and has been a central institution in local education and community events. The school reflects the agricultural and small-town heritage of the region while continuing to expand academic and extracurricular opportunities for students.

== Academics ==
The school offers a range of courses in core academic subjects, including mathematics, science, English, and social studies, as well as career and technical education programs. Students may also participate in dual-credit, advanced academic, and extracurricular academic competitions.

== Athletics ==
Whitesboro High School fields teams in football, basketball, baseball, softball, track and field, volleyball, golf, tennis, and other UIL-sanctioned sports. The Bearcats have competed in regional and district athletic contests throughout their history.

Students at Whitesboro High School participate in organizations such as Future Farmers of America (FFA), Whitesboro Historical and Preservation Society (WHPS), student council, band, theater, and UIL academic events. Community involvement and school spirit are important aspects of campus culture.
