= Bobby Plummer =

American football player and coach

No. 73
- Position: Offensive guard

Personal information
- Born: July 25, 1940; Seymour, Texas, U.S.
- Died: December 4, 2024 (aged 84)
- Listed height: 6 ft 2 in (1.88 m)
- Listed weight: 235 lb (107 kg)

Career information
- High school: Seymour (TX)
- College: TCU
- NFL draft: 1962: 3rd round, 39th overall pick
- AFL draft: 1962: 5th round, 35th overall pick

Career history
- Dallas Cowboys (1962)*
- * Offseason or practice squad member only

Awards and highlights
- Second-team All-SWC (1961)

Bobby Plummer (July 25, 1940 – December 4, 2024) was an American football head coach for Sharpstown High School. He played college football at Texas Christian University. He was selected by the Dallas Cowboys in the third round (39th overall) of the 1962 NFL draft. He died on December 28, 2024 in Houston, Texas.

== Early life ==
Plummer attended Seymour High School, where he received All-state honors as a senior. He accepted a football scholarship from Texas Christian University. He was a two-way tackle and became a starter as a sophomore, playing on the same line as Bob Lilly and Don Floyd.

As a senior in 1961, he was the starter at right tackle. He accidentally hit All-American halfback Jimmy Saxton in the head with his knee, which contributed to a poor game by Saxton and TCU defeating the previous unbeaten University of Texas 6–0. He received second-team All-SWC honors after the season.

== Professional career ==
Plummer was selected by the Dallas Cowboys in the third round (39th overall) of the 1962 NFL draft and by the Dallas Texans in the fifth round (35th overall) of the 1962 AFL draft.

On December 6, 1961, he signed with the Cowboys. During training camp he was tried at offensive tackle and guard. He was released on September 4, 1962.

== Coaching career ==
Plummer was the head football coach at Sharpstown High School for 28 years (1972–1999), where he had a 112–164–4 record. Sharpstown made the Houston High School playoffs in 1984, which, at the time were held in the Astrodome, losing to Spring Branch in the first round.

Sharpstown High School was one of only three high schools in the Houston Independent School District that would allow international students to attend in the 1990's, with a monthly tuition fee of $350. Despite this, Coach Plummer refused to allow any foreign students to play on the varsity team, telling the other coaches it would mean benching an American student, regardless of the ability of the players.
