= Round Timber, Texas =

- Unincorporated community
- Location within Texas Location within the United States
- Coordinates: 33°26′09″N 99°04′14″W
- Country: United States
- State: Texas
- County: Baylor
- Elevation: 1,230 ft (370 m)
- Time zone: UTC-6 (Central (CST))
  - Summer (DST): UTC-5 (CDT)
- Area code: 940
- GNIS feature ID: 1380464

Round Timber is an unincorporated community in Baylor County, in the U.S. state of Texas.

== History ==
Round Timber was founded when a cabin was built by John W. Stevens in 1874. Colonel C.C. Mills tried to settle in the area in the late 1850s or 1860s but was forced out by Native American tribes. He then returned in 1875. It was named Round Timber, for two trees that were used to build with. It moved four miles northwest and became a local trading center. Its population was 25 in 1940, 10 in 1980, eight in 1990, and only two in 2000.

== Geography ==
Round Timber is located on Farm to Market Road 2374 near the Throckmorton County line in southeastern Baylor County.

== Education ==
Today, the community is served by the Seymour Independent School District.
