= Seymour High School =

Seymour High School may refer to:

- Seymour High School (Connecticut) in Seymour, Connecticut
- Seymour High School (Illinois) in Payson, Illinois
- Seymour High School (Indiana) in Seymour, Indiana
- Seymour High School (Iowa) in Seymour, Iowa
- Seymour High School (Missouri) in Seymour, Missouri
- Seymour High School (Tennessee) in Seymour, Tennessee
- Seymour High School (Texas) in Seymour, Texas

Schools with similar names include:

- Mahomet-Seymour High School in Mahomet, Illinois
- Seymour Community High School in Seymour, Wisconsin
- Seymour Technical High School in Seymour, Victoria, Australia
