= Etta Gray =

American physician and clubwoman (1880–1970)

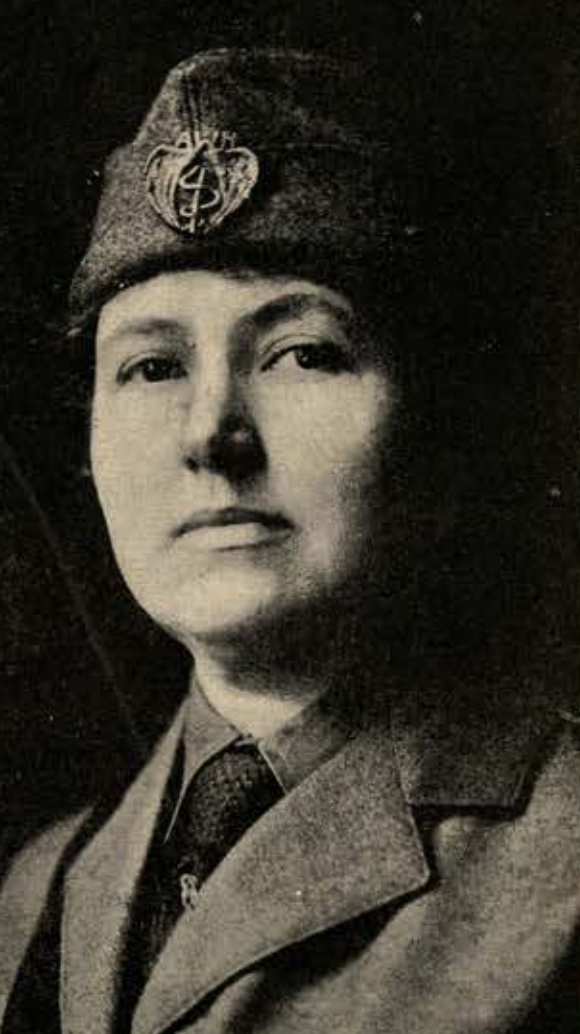
- Etta Gray, from a 1925 publication
- Born: Etta Glass; November 26, 1880; Whitesboro, Texas
- Died: October 24, 1970 (aged 89); Pomona, California
- Occupations: Physician, clubwoman

Etta Glass Gray (November 26, 1880 – October 24, 1970) was an American physician, surgeon, and clubwoman from Los Angeles. She was head of the American Women's Hospitals Service work in Serbia after World War I. She was president of the American Medical Women's Association from 1919 to 1920.

== Early life and education ==
Etta Glass was born in Whitesboro, Texas, the daughter of J. R. Glass, and adopted or fostered by a California woman named Emma C. Gray. She graduated from Hanford Union High School in 1902, and graduated from Stanford University with a medical degree in 1906.

== Career ==
Gray was a surgeon in Los Angeles. She was California state chair of the American Women's Hospitals Service, left for France with the organization in the autumn of 1918, and directed the service's five hospitals in Serbia from 1920 to 1922. She adopted a Serbian orphan during her time there. She was president of the American Medical Women's Association from 1919 to 1920.

Gray was state chair of public health for the California Federation of Women's Clubs in the 1920s. In 1928, she and another doctor, Olive Walton, broke ground for a new hospital on the grounds of the Los Angeles Juvenile Hall. In 1931, She gave a series of lectures on child health in Los Angeles.

Gray was elected president of the Los Angeles chapter of Soroptimists in 1932. Also in 1932, she was the physician assigned to women athletes at the Summer Olympics in Los Angeles. In 1943, she testified for the prosecution in the statutory rape trial of actor Errol Flynn.

Gray was an enthusiastic gardener, especially known for her orchids and irises; she was co-chair of the Hollywood Garden Club in the 1940s.

== Personal life ==
Gray raised her daughter, Jane Gray, in Los Angeles. Gray died in Pomona, California in 1970, at the age of 89.
