= Ambrose B. White =

American pioneer (1811–1885)

Captain Ambrose B. White
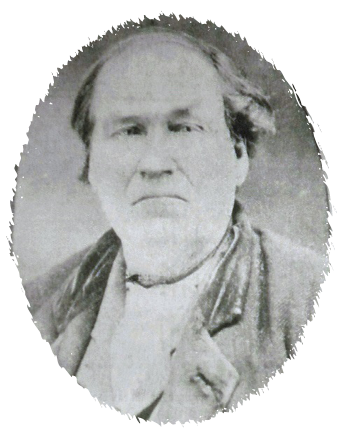
- Born: October 20, 1814; Ohio, United States
- Died: December 17, 1885 (aged 71); Whitesboro, Texas, United States
- Known for: Founder of Whitesboro, Texas
- Title: Captain
- Spouse: Sarah Elizabeth Murdoch White (m. 1833)
- Children: 3

Ambrose B. White (October 24, 1811 – December 17, 1885) was an American pioneer and the founder of Whitesboro, Texas. He played a significant role in the early settlement of western Grayson County and in the development of what would become the City of Whitesboro.

White was born in Ohio on October 24, 1811, and spent his early years near Springfield, Ohio, and later in the Illinois Territory. He served in the Black Hawk War in 1832, during which he met Sarah Elizabeth Murdah. The couple married on June 20, 1833.

In the spring of 1848, White, his family, and several other families migrated from Illinois to Texas. After approximately two months of travel, they settled in what is now western Grayson County, an area then known as "Wolfpath" because of its dense forests and large wolf population. White assisted in surveying and establishing the settlement that became known as White's Colony, one of the earliest communities in the area.

The settlement remained small during its early years because of its remote location. Its importance increased after the Butterfield Overland Mail established a stagecoach route through the region. White constructed the Westview Inn to serve travelers and stagecoach passengers, and the community was sometimes referred to as Westview Inn as well as White's Colony. He also maintained and supplied horse teams for the Butterfield route, providing an important source of income and helping attract additional settlers. By the beginning of the American Civil War, the settlement was home to approximately fourteen families.

During the Civil War, White entered Confederate service as a captain and organized a company that served with Bourland's Frontier Regiment along the Red River frontier.

Following the war, White remained in the community and witnessed its continued growth into what became the City of Whitesboro. He died in Whitesboro on December 17, 1885.
