= Younger Sullivan House =

Younger-Sullivan House
- Interactive map of Younger-Sullivan House
- 33.6579°N 96.9051°W
- Location: 200 Center St, Whitesboro, TX 76273

History
- Built: 1889
- Built for: Dr. R. N. Younger

Site notes
- Governing body: City of Whitesboro Preservation Board
- Owner: City of Whitesboro

The Younger-Sullivan House is a historic residence in Whitesboro, Texas, located at 200 Center Street. The two-story Victorian house was constructed in 1889 by Dr. R. N. Younger, a local church, banking, and school leader.

== History ==
The Younger-Sullivan House was built in 1889 by Dr. R. N. Younger, who was described as a leader in the church, banking, and education in Whitesboro. The house is described in historical tourism publications as an ornate Victorian residence. In 1923, the house was purchased by Frank Edgar Nichols and Sarah Gordon Nichols. Sarah Gordon Nichols was the mother of four daughters—Beryl, Hortense, Martha, and Mona Sullivan—who were raised in the house and lived there for most of their lives.

The house remained associated with the Sullivan family until the death of Mona Sullivan, the last surviving sister, in 1995. Sullivan willed the property to the City of Whitesboro, putting the house into public ownership so as to be preserved as a historic property.

== Architecture ==
The Younger-Sullivan House is a Victorian-era residence constructed in 1889. A description associated with the historic marker states that the house has southern exposure in ten of its twelve rooms and halls and contains beveled mirrors incorporated into three of its six hand-carved mantels. The house's Victorian architecture and surviving interior details have made it one of Whitesboro's notable historic buildings. The Texas State Travel Guide described the residence as an "ornate Victorian home" and noted that it was available for local receptions and tours.

== Historic designation and preservation ==
The Younger-Sullivan House received a Texas Historical Marker in 1986, according to local and regional historical publications. The property has subsequently been maintained as a historic site and has been used for tours, receptions, weddings, and other community events.

The City of Whitesboro acquired the property through Mona Sullivan's 1995 bequest. Local visitor guides state that preservation of the house has been managed by the Whitesboro Preservation Board.
