= Whitesboro Independent School District =

School district in Texas

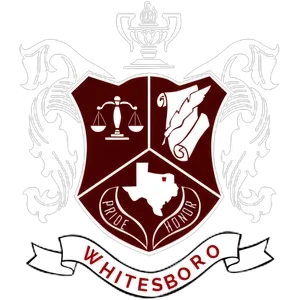

Address
- 115 4th Street Whitesboro, TX, USA ESC Region 10
- Coordinates: 33°39′53″N 96°54′44″W

District information
- Type: Independent School District
- Grades: PK-12
- Superintendent: Ryan Harper
- Governing agency: Texas Education Agency
- Schools: 5
- NCES District ID: 4845630

Students and staff
- Students: 1,761 (2025-26)
- Athletic conference: UIL Class AAA
- District mascot: Bearcats
- Colors: Maroon, Black, and Vegas Gold

Other information
- Website: www.whitesboroisd.org

Whitesboro Independent School District (Whitesboro ISD, WISD) is a public school district based in Whitesboro, Texas, United States. Covering 173 square miles, the district is primarily located in western Grayson County, with portions extending into eastern Cooke County, and serves the City of Whitesboro, community of Gordonville, and their surrounding areas.

As of 2026, Whitesboro ISD operates five campuses, including one high school, one middle school, and three primary schools. The district most recently received a C rating from the Texas Education Agency (TEA).

== Schools ==
- Whitesboro Early Childhood Center (grades Pre-Kindergarten, Kindergarten, 1st)
- J.W. "Dub" Hayes Primary (grades 2-3)
- Whitesboro Intermediate (grades 4–5)
- Whitesboro Middle (grades 6–8)
- Whitesboro High (grades 9–12)

== History ==
- The 1840s-1860s: The first schools in the Whitesboro area were taught in crude log cabins by early settlers and community founders, including Captain A.B. White, who converted his hotel into a school during the Civil War.
- Whitesboro Normal School (1878): A prominent private primary school called the Whitesboro Normal School was established by James M. Carlisle. It operated until 1882 when Carlisle took over as the superintendent of the local public school system.

== Achievements ==
- In 2011, Whitesboro made the football playoffs for the first time since the program started – in 1936, ending an 84-year playoff drought.
- Whitesboro's Debate team (established in 2006) has always competed extremely well. In policy debate, they often sweep invitational tournaments. They have qualified three teams for NSDA nationals in the "Lyndon B. Johnson" NSDA district. In 2013 Brady Flanery became the first student from Whitesboro to make it to the state level competition in Lincoln Douglas debate. In 2014 Rebekah Urban was the first student from Whitesboro to place in University Interscholastic League (UIL) extemporaneous speaking. That same year she was the first to qualify and place in UIL Student Congress from Whitesboro. In 2015 a policy team consisting of partners Adam Wilson and Cody Crowe won UIL state for the 3A classification. The following year (2016) the team took home the silver competing in the same competition. Adam has received two bronze and one silver UIL speaking gavels and Cody has received a silver UIL speaking gavel. In Lincoln–Douglas debate, Joe Mason placed 3rd at UIL State in 2016. Other members of the team have qualified for UIL State countless times in CX debate, LD debate, Persuasive & Informative speaking, as well as Congressional Debate.

== Demographic ==
Whitesboro ISD Ethnicity Data
Ethnicity	Percentage
White	69.7%
Hispanic/Latino	22.7%
Two or more races	5.0%
American Indian or Alaska Native	1.3%
Black or African American	0.5%
Asian or Asian Pacific Islander	0.5%
Native Hawaiian or Other Pacific Islander	0.4%
