= Whitesboro, Texas =

- City
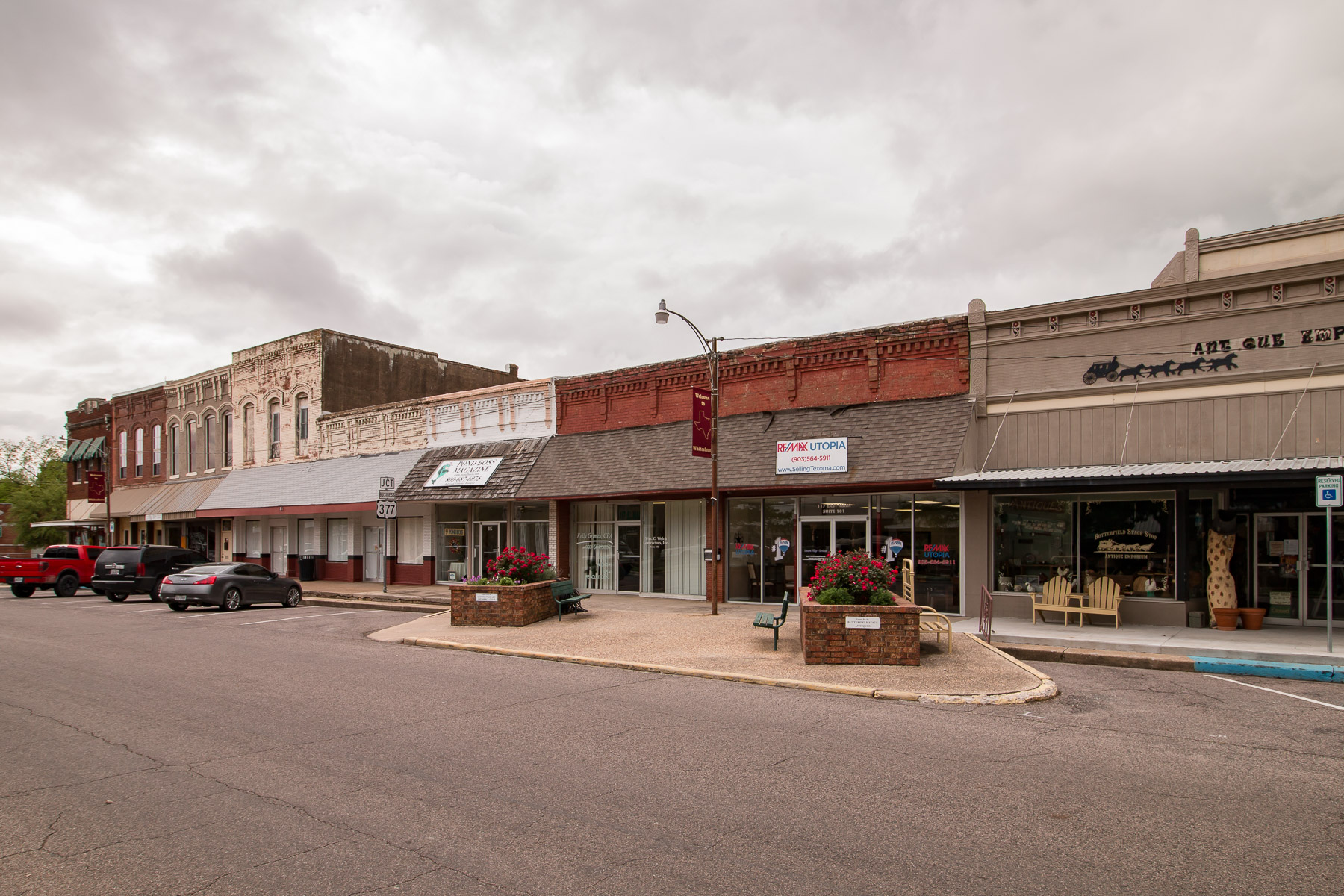
- Downtown Whitesboro

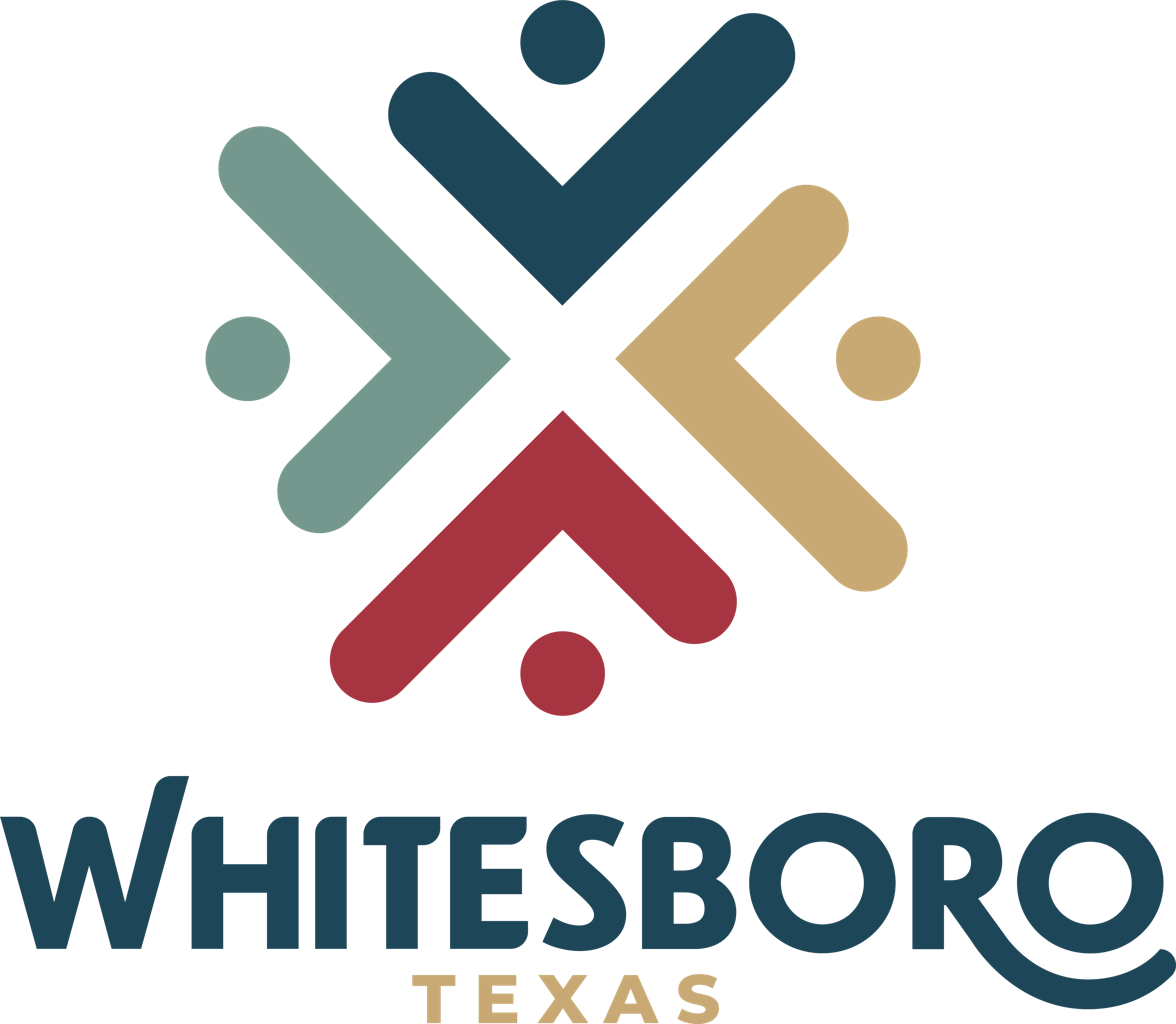
- Seal
- Nickname(s): The Boro, Wolf Path
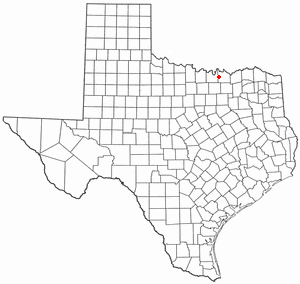
- Location of Whitesboro, Texas

- Coordinates: 33°39′41″N 96°54′08″W
- Country: United States
- State: Texas
- County: Grayson

Government
  - Type: Council-manager
  - Mayor: Jeff Butts
  - City Administrator: Phil Harris

Area
  - Total: 3.34 sq mi (8.66 km^{2})
  - Land: 3.34 sq mi (8.64 km^{2})
  - Water: 0.0077 sq mi (0.02 km^{2})
- Elevation: 781 ft (238 m)

Population (2020)
  - Total: 4,074
  - Density: 1,220/sq mi (472/km^{2})
- Time zone: UTC-6 (Central (CST))
  - Summer (DST): UTC-5 (CDT)
- ZIP code: 76273
- Area codes: 903, 430
- FIPS code: 48-78532
- GNIS feature ID: 2412259
- Website: www.whitesboro.org

Whitesboro is a city in Grayson County, Texas, United States. The population was 4,074 at the 2020 census. Whitesboro is named for its founder, Ambrose B. White.

It is part of the Sherman-Denison metropolitan area.

== History ==
Native Americans had hunted in the area.

The area was once known as "Wolf Path". The first settler in the area was Robert Diamond, but the settlement of Wolf Path began with the arrival of Ambrose B. White and his family in 1848. The Butterfield Overland Mail route used White's Westview Inn as the "Diamond Station" on its trail from the Mississippi River to the Pacific Coast from 1858 to 1861. A post office, under the name "Whitesborough", began operations there in 1860.

After the Civil War, Whitesborough grew into a frontier town where female residents were prohibited from leaving their homes on Saturday nights because shootings were so common. Whitesborough had a population of 500, saloons, several stores, and other businesses when it was incorporated on June 2, 1873. By 1879, it had a bank, a newspaper, and train service from Denison on a line from the Missouri, Kansas and Texas Railroad. In 1887, it altered the spelling of its name to "Whitesboro".

In 1903, racial tensions were high in Whitesboro after an "Anti-White Man's Club" left a note threatening to poison local wells and "foully treat" and murder "some white girl". Later that year, a black male was held by police for identification following an alleged attempted rape of a white Whitesboro woman. A large mob broke into the man's cell and attempted to hang him from a tree; he was rescued by police. The mob then fired guns toward homes occupied by blacks, and ordered them to leave town, resulting in the large exodus of a once majority black town.

It was suspected that threats made from the "Anti-White man's club" were fabricated notes from white residents of Whitesboro created in order to create fake hysteria and further racial tensions.

Whitesboro is located in western Grayson County. US 82 passes through the northern side of the city, and US 377 passes through the eastern side. US 82 leads east 17 miles (27 km) to Sherman, the county seat, and west 13 miles (21 km) to Gainesville, while US 377 leads north 15 miles (24 km) to the Oklahoma state line on the Red River and south 41 miles (66 km) to Denton.

According to the United States Census Bureau, Whitesboro has a total area of 3.3 square miles (8.6 km^{2}), of which 0.006 square miles (0.015 km^{2}), or 0.18%, are water.

=== Historical Markers ===
- City of Whitesboro
- Younger Sullivan House
- Bennett Richardson House
- Diamond Horse Ranch
- Sanborn Ranch
- Mary Florence Cowell (Chapter A P.E.O.)

== Demographics ==
Historical population
Census	Pop.	Note	%±
1880	773		—
1890	1,170		51.4%
1900	1,243		6.2%
1910	1,219		−1.9%
1920	1,810		48.5%
1930	1,535		−15.2%
1940	1,560		1.6%
1950	1,854		18.8%
1960	2,485		34.0%
1970	2,927		17.8%
1980	3,197		9.2%
1990	3,209		0.4%
2000	3,760		17.2%
2010	3,793		0.9%
2020	4,074		7.4%
U.S. Decennial Census

=== 2020 census ===
As of the 2020 census, Whitesboro had a population of 4,074. The median age was 37.9 years. 26.5% of residents were under the age of 18 and 17.8% of residents were 65 years of age or older. For every 100 females there were 91.1 males, and for every 100 females age 18 and over there were 85.3 males age 18 and over.

0.0% of residents lived in urban areas, while 100.0% lived in rural areas.

There were 1,619 households in Whitesboro, of which 32.7% had children under the age of 18 living in them. Of all households, 45.5% were married-couple households, 15.5% were households with a male householder and no spouse or partner present, and 32.9% were households with a female householder and no spouse or partner present. About 29.5% of all households were made up of individuals and 13.2% had someone living alone who was 65 years of age or older.

There were 1,765 housing units, of which 8.3% were vacant. The homeowner vacancy rate was 2.6% and the rental vacancy rate was 6.9%.

Racial composition as of the 2020 census
Race	Number	Percent
White	3,309	81.2%
Black or African American	33	0.8%
American Indian and Alaska Native	43	1.1%
Asian	30	0.7%
Native Hawaiian and Other Pacific Islander	0	0.0%
Some other race	177	4.3%
Two or more races	482	11.8%
Hispanic or Latino (of any race)	483	11.9%

== Fire Department ==
Whitesboro Fire Department
- Logo
- Address: 206 W Main St, Whitesboro, TX 76273

Agency overview
- Employees: 12
- Fire chief: Jeff Patterson
- Assistant Chief: Steven Wilcox
- Fire Marshal: Kevin Walton

Facilities and equipment
- Stations: 1
- Engines: 3
- Trucks: 5
- Ambulances: 4

Website
- whitesborofirerescue.com

The Whitesboro Fire Department is an American fire and emergency medical services agency serving Whitesboro. It is headquartered at 206 West Main Street in Whitesboro, which serves as the department's primary fire and emergency-services station. The department provides fire suppression, rescue, emergency medical services, and other emergency response services. Its training programs include fire suppression, rescue operations, emergency medical care, leadership, and public service. The department also conducts fire prevention programs, public education, youth outreach, CPR training, and emergency preparedness education. The department responds to emergencies throughout Whitesboro and its fire district and participates in mutual-aid responses with surrounding fire departments. In April 2025, Whitesboro firefighters responded to a large apartment fire at the Oakview Apartment Complex alongside firefighters from nine other departments. Nearly 50 firefighters participated in the response.

The department was established in 1915 as a volunteer organization and has since developed into a combination fire and EMS department providing fire suppression, rescue, and emergency medical services. The department initially consisted of a small number of volunteers and had limited equipment. During its early history, the fire and rescue organizations operated separately with different groups of volunteers before eventually being combined into the modern department. One of the department's earliest documented major fires occurred in November 1915, when two two-story brick commercial buildings in downtown Whitesboro were destroyed by fire. The buildings housed businesses including the North Texas Telephone Company, the Majestic Theater, an attorney's office, and a restaurant. The fire also temporarily disrupted telephone service in the community.

For much of its history, the department relied heavily on volunteers. Generations of Whitesboro-area residents have served as firefighters, with some families having multiple generations participate in the department. In April 2019, the City of Whitesboro hired Steve Pinkston as the department's first full-time fire chief and fire marshal. The hiring marked a transition toward increased professional staffing while maintaining the department's volunteer component.

In 2022, the city expanded the department's role to include municipal emergency medical services. The department's EMS division hired its first full-time shift-based employees in September 2022, and Whitesboro Fire Department ambulances began responding to calls on October 1, 2022. The department assumed full responsibility for EMS operations in western Grayson County and operates two Mobile Intensive Care Unit ambulances around the clock. The EMS division is staffed by full-time emergency medical technicians and paramedics and provides advanced prehospital medical care throughout its service area. The EMS service area extends beyond the department's 54.4-square-mile fire district, serving approximately 280 square miles of western Grayson County.

The Whitesboro Fire Department operates as a combination department consisting of career and volunteer personnel. Its operations are divided into fire and EMS divisions. The EMS division operates two MICU ambulances 24 hours a day, 365 days a year, staffed by full-time EMTs and paramedics. The fire division has historically relied primarily on volunteers, with volunteers responding during the day as available and working a rotating shift system at night. In January 2026, the department began providing continuous 24-hour fire protection through full-time staffing supplemented by volunteer firefighters. The change provided staffed fire protection 24 hours a day, seven days a week, 365 days a year. The department also transitioned to a 48-hours-on, 96-hours-off schedule for its full-time firefighters.

=== Leadership ===
Steve Pinkston became the department's first full-time fire chief in 2019. He served as fire chief for several years and oversaw the department's transition toward increased staffing and the development of municipal EMS services. Jeff Patterson was appointed Director of Public Safety in March 2025, overseeing fire, EMS, dispatch, and emergency management operations for the city.

Patterson was appointed Fire Chief of the Whitesboro Fire Department effective May 1, 2026, succeeding Pinkston, who retired as fire chief. Patterson had previously served with the department as a volunteer and assistant fire chief and had more than two decades of professional fire and emergency-services experience.

=== Volunteer service ===
Volunteer firefighters have remained an important part of the Whitesboro Fire Department throughout its history. The department's volunteer tradition dates to its founding in 1915, and generations of local residents have served with the department. Although the department has expanded its full-time staffing, volunteers continue to supplement career personnel and remain an important component of the department's fire operations.

== Parks and Recreation ==
The City of Whitesboro operates a Parks and Recreation Department that provides community programs, youth sports leagues, and recreational facilities. Programs include basketball, baseball, softball, and seasonal camps.

=== Facilities ===
- Jimmie O. Rector Community Center (which offers event space, recreational amenities and Public pool)
- Westside Youth Center
- Charles E. Baum Gymnasium (Owned by Whitesboro ISD)
- Trolinger Park
- Godwin Park
- Whitecotton Park
- Center Street Park
- Tot Lot Park
- Cherry Street Park

== Education ==
The city is served by the Whitesboro Independent School District.

The City of Whitesboro operates the Whitesboro Public Library.

== Media ==
Whitesboro is home to the Whitesboro News Record that serves all of western Grayson County as the local news source.

== Infrastructure ==
- U.S. Route 82
- U.S. Route 377
- Business U.S. Route 377
- Texas State Highway 56
- Farm to Market Road 901

== Notable people ==
- Rayford Barnes (1920–2000), actor
- Etta Gray (1880–1970), physician
- Lydia Starr McPherson (1827–1903), founded Whitesboro Democrat newspaper in the late 1870s
- Jared L. Patterson, member of the Texas House of Representatives
- Ray Renfro, professional football player
- Grizzly Smith, professional wrestler

== See also ==
- List of cities in Texas
