= List of Texas Tech Lady Raiders head basketball coaches =

The Texas Tech Lady Raiders basketball program competes in the National Collegiate Athletic Association's (NCAA) Division I, representing Texas Tech University in the Big 12 Conference. The program has had 7 head coaches since it began play during the 1975–76 basketball season.

== Key ==
General
#	Number of coaches
GC	Games coached
†	Elected to the Women's Basketball Hall of Fame

Overall
OW	Wins
OL	Losses
O%	Winning percentage

Conference
CW	Wins
CL	Losses
C%	Winning percentage

Postseason
PA	Appearances
PW	Wins
PL	Losses

Championships
CC	Conference regular season
CT	Conference tournament
NC	National

=== Statistics ===
Statistics correct as of the end of the 2010–11 NCAA Division I women's basketball season

#	Name	Season(s)	GC	OW	OL	O%	CW	CL	C%	PW	PL	RCs	TCs	NCs	Awards
1	Susie Lynch	1975–1977	70	35	35	.500	—	—	—	—	—	—	—	0	—
2	Gay Benson	1977–1980	114	67	47	.588	—	—	—	—	—	—	—	0	—
3	Donna Wick	1980–1982	60	31	29	.517	—	—	—	—	—	—	—	0	—
4	Marsha Sharp^{†}	1982–2006	761	572	189	.752	278	91	.863	34	19	8	5	1	SWC Coach of the Year (1983, 1991, 1992, 1993, 1994, 1995); Big 12 Coach of the Year (1998, 1999)
5	Kristy Curry	2006–2013	161	88	73	.547	29	41	.414	2	3	0	0	0	—
6	Candace Whitaker	2013–2018	136	54	82	.397	13	61	.176	0	0	0	0	0	—
Int	Shimmy Gray-Miller	2018	17	1	16	.059	1	15	.063	0	0	0	0	0	—
7	Marlene Stollings	2018-2020	60	32	28	.533	11	25	.306	0	0	0	0	0	—
8	Krista Gerlich	2020-2022	44	21	33	.389	9	27	.250	0	0	0	0	0	—
