= Baylor County, Texas =

County in Texas, United States

- County
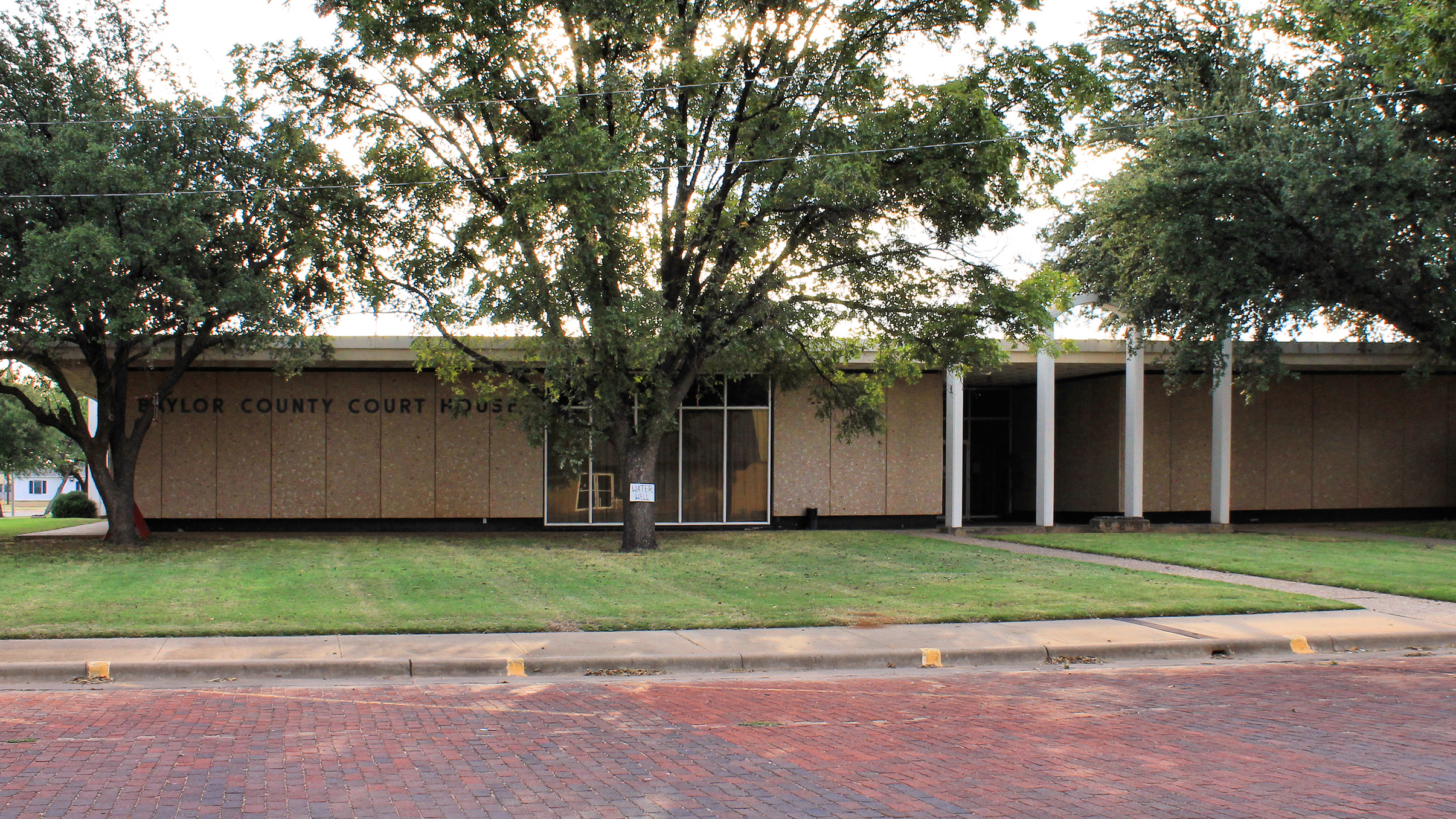
- The Baylor County Courthouse in Seymour

- Location within the U.S. state of Texas
- Coordinates: 33°38′N 99°13′W
- Country: United States
- State: Texas
- Founded: 1879
- Named for: Henry Weidner Baylor
- Seat: Seymour
- Largest city: Seymour

Area
  - Total: 901 sq mi (2,330 km^{2})
  - Land: 867 sq mi (2,250 km^{2})
  - Water: 34 sq mi (88 km^{2}) 3.7%

Population (2020)
  - Total: 3,465
  - Estimate (2025): 3,472 ▲
  - Density: 4.00/sq mi (1.54/km^{2})
- Time zone: UTC−6 (Central)
  - Summer (DST): UTC−5 (CDT)
- Congressional district: 13th
- Website: www.co.baylor.tx.us

Baylor County is a county located in the U.S. state of Texas. As of the 2020 census, its population was 3,465. Its county seat is Seymour.

== History ==
In 1858, the Texas Legislature established Baylor County, naming it for Henry Weidner Baylor, a surgeon in the Texas Rangers during the Mexican–American War. It organized in 1879.

== Geography ==
According to the U.S. Census Bureau, the county has a total area of 901 sq mi (2,330 km^{2}), of which 34 sq mi (88 km^{2}) (3.7%) are covered by water.

=== Major highways ===
- U.S. Highway 82
- U.S. Highway 183
- U.S. Highway 277
- U.S. Highway 283
- State Highway 114
- Spur 334

=== Adjacent counties ===
- Wilbarger County (north)
- Wichita County (northeast)
- Archer County (east)
- Young County (southeast)
- Throckmorton County (south)
- Haskell County (southwest)
- Knox County (west)
- Foard County (northwest)

== Geology ==
Baylor County is part of the Texas Red Beds, which are strata of red-colored sedimentary rock from the Early Permian. The fossils of Permian period vertebrates in the Texas Red Beds were first discovered by Edward Drinker Cope in 1877. Subsequent research has revealed rare fossils of Permian amphibians like Trimerorhachis, as well as rich deposits of other Permian tetrapods such as Dimetrodon and Diadectes. Seymouria baylorensis, a species of Seymouria, was first discovered and named after Baylor County and the city of Seymour.

== Demographics ==
Historical population
Census	Pop.	Note	%±
1880	715		—
1890	2,595		262.9%
1900	3,052		17.6%
1910	8,411		175.6%
1920	7,027		−16.5%
1930	7,418		5.6%
1940	7,755		4.5%
1950	6,875		−11.3%
1960	5,893		−14.3%
1970	5,221		−11.4%
1980	4,919		−5.8%
1990	4,385		−10.9%
2000	4,093		−6.7%
2010	3,726		−9.0%
2020	3,465		−7.0%
2025 (est.)	3,472	▲	0.2%
U.S. Decennial Census; 1850–2010 2010 2020

=== Racial and ethnic composition ===
Baylor County, Texas – Racial and ethnic composition Note: the US Census treats Hispanic/Latino as an ethnic category. This table excludes Latinos from the racial categories and assigns them to a separate category. Hispanics/Latinos may be of any race.
Race / Ethnicity (NH = Non-Hispanic)	Pop 1980	Pop 1990	Pop 2000	Pop 2010	Pop 2020	% 1980	% 1990	% 2000	% 2010	% 2020
White alone (NH)	4,408	3,848	3,511	3,147	2,797	89.61%	87.75%	85.78%	84.46%	80.72%
Black or African American alone (NH)	179	180	135	71	52	3.64%	4.10%	3.30%	1.91%	1.50%
Native American or Alaska Native alone (NH)	13	9	22	10	11	0.26%	0.21%	0.54%	0.27%	0.32%
Asian alone (NH)	7	13	15	4	9	0.14%	0.30%	0.37%	0.11%	0.26%
Native Hawaiian or Pacific Islander alone (NH)	x	x	5	3	0	x	x	0.12%	0.08%	0.00%
Other race alone (NH)	6	1	0	1	8	0.12%	0.02%	0.00%	0.03%	0.23%
Mixed race or Multiracial (NH)	x	x	23	35	149	x	x	0.56%	0.94%	4.30%
Hispanic or Latino (any race)	306	334	382	455	439	6.22%	7.62%	9.33%	12.21%	12.67%
Total	4,919	4,385	4,093	3,726	3,465	100.00%	100.00%	100.00%	100.00%	100.00%

=== 2020 census ===
As of the 2020 census, the county had a population of 3,465. The median age was 44.8 years. 23.9% of residents were under the age of 18 and 24.1% of residents were 65 years of age or older. For every 100 females there were 93.1 males, and for every 100 females age 18 and over there were 89.0 males age 18 and over.

The racial makeup of the county was 87.6% White, 1.6% Black or African American, 0.3% American Indian and Alaska Native, 0.3% Asian, <0.1% Native Hawaiian and Pacific Islander, 3.3% from some other race, and 6.9% from two or more races. Hispanic or Latino residents of any race comprised 12.7% of the population.

<0.1% of residents lived in urban areas, while 100.0% lived in rural areas.

There were 1,503 households in the county, of which 28.6% had children under the age of 18 living in them. Of all households, 44.3% were married-couple households, 20.4% were households with a male householder and no spouse or partner present, and 29.3% were households with a female householder and no spouse or partner present. About 34.5% of all households were made up of individuals and 18.4% had someone living alone who was 65 years of age or older.

There were 2,094 housing units, of which 28.2% were vacant. Among occupied housing units, 69.0% were owner-occupied and 31.0% were renter-occupied. The homeowner vacancy rate was 1.8% and the rental vacancy rate was 10.7%.

=== 2000 census ===
As of the 2000 census, 4,093 people, 1,791 households, and 1,156 families resided in the county. The population density was five people per square mile (1.9 people/km^{2}). The 2,820 housing units averaged three units per square mile (1.2 units/km^{2}). The racial makeup of the county was 90.96% White, 3.35% Black or African American, 0.59% Native American, 0.51% Asian, 0.12% Pacific Islander, 3.32% from other races and 1.15% from two or more races; 9.33% were Hispanic or Latino of any race.

Of the 1,791 households, 25.2% had children under the age of 18 residing in them, 53.5% were married couples living together, 8.2% had a female householder with no husband present, and 35.4% were not families. In addition, 33.30% of all households were made up of individuals, and 19.2% had someone living alone who was 65 years of age or older. The average household size was 2.26 and the average family size was 2.86.

In the county, the population was distributed as 23.4% under the age of 18, 5.5% from 18 to 24, 21.4% from 25 to 44, 25.6% from 45 to 64, and 24.1% who were 65 years of age or older. The median age was 45 years. For every 100 females, there were 89.50 males. For every 100 females age 18 and over, there were 86.70 males.

The median income for a household in the county was $24,627, and for a family was $34,583. Males had a median income of $21,607 versus $19,571 for females. The per capita income for the county was $16,384. About 16.1% of the population and 12.9% of families were below the poverty line, and 26.3% of those under the age of 18 and 9% of those 65 and older were living below the poverty line.

=== Educational attainment ===
According to the 2000 census, 21.2% of those aged over 25 did not have a high school diploma, while 32.7% did. Roughly 8.7% of the population had a bachelor's degree, 2.3% had a master's degree, and 0.2% had a doctoral degree. No males had doctoral degrees, while 0.4% of females had one.

== Education ==
Almost all of Baylor County is served by the Seymour Independent School District, which also serves portions of adjacent counties. A small portion is served by the Olney Independent School District. The OISD portion was served by the Megargel Independent School District, until MISD closed after May 2006.

The county is in the service area of Vernon College.

== Communities ==
=== City ===
- Seymour (county seat)

=== Unincorporated communities ===
- Bomarton
- Mabelle
- Red Springs
- Round Timber
- Westover

== Politics ==
United States presidential election results for Baylor County, Texas
Year	Republican		Democratic		Third party(ies)	
Year	No.	%	No.	%	No.	%
1912	15	2.43%	551	89.30%	51	8.27%
1916	47	5.62%	711	85.05%	78	9.33%
1920	139	16.18%	632	73.57%	88	10.24%
1924	135	11.61%	1,012	87.02%	16	1.38%
1928	491	38.51%	784	61.49%	0	0.00%
1932	55	3.68%	1,437	96.25%	1	0.07%
1936	100	6.09%	1,541	93.85%	1	0.06%
1940	139	7.69%	1,667	92.25%	1	0.06%
1944	102	5.70%	1,568	87.65%	119	6.65%
1948	101	6.03%	1,522	90.81%	53	3.16%
1952	879	43.43%	1,142	56.42%	3	0.15%
1956	715	40.49%	1,047	59.29%	4	0.23%
1960	713	37.27%	1,199	62.68%	1	0.05%
1964	389	21.68%	1,403	78.21%	2	0.11%
1968	657	30.36%	1,064	49.17%	443	20.47%
1972	1,190	66.52%	598	33.43%	1	0.06%
1976	783	36.76%	1,335	62.68%	12	0.56%
1980	1,098	47.61%	1,183	51.30%	25	1.08%
1984	1,314	56.01%	1,019	43.44%	13	0.55%
1988	914	44.15%	1,153	55.70%	3	0.14%
1992	611	28.66%	990	46.44%	531	24.91%
1996	860	41.23%	955	45.78%	271	12.99%
2000	1,285	64.77%	663	33.42%	36	1.81%
2004	1,169	71.28%	467	28.48%	4	0.24%
2008	1,262	76.81%	366	22.28%	15	0.91%
2012	1,297	81.47%	267	16.77%	28	1.76%
2016	1,267	84.52%	191	12.74%	41	2.74%
2020	1,494	87.78%	183	10.75%	25	1.47%
2024	1,471	87.82%	184	10.99%	20	1.19%

United States Senate election results for Baylor County, Texas1
Year	Republican		Democratic		Third party(ies)	
Year	No.	%	No.	%	No.	%
2024	1,433	85.71%	199	11.90%	40	2.39%

United States Senate election results for Baylor County, Texas2
Year	Republican		Democratic		Third party(ies)	
Year	No.	%	No.	%	No.	%
2020	1,462	87.13%	177	10.55%	39	2.32%

Texas Gubernatorial election results for Baylor County
Year	Republican		Democratic		Third party(ies)	
Year	No.	%	No.	%	No.	%
2022	1,183	90.51%	105	8.03%	19	1.45%

Baylor County is represented in the Texas House of Representatives by Republican James Frank, a businessman from Wichita Falls.

Baylor County is located within District 69 of the Texas House of Representatives. Baylor County is located within District 28 of the Texas Senate.

== See also ==
- Recorded Texas Historic Landmarks in Baylor County
