= Seymour Independent School District =

School district in Texas

Coordinates: 33°35′35.5″N 99°15′57.9″W

Location
- Seymour, Texas ESC Region 9 U.S.

District information
- Type: Public Independent school district
- Grades: EE through 12
- Superintendent: John Anderson
- Schools: 3 (2011–2012)
- NCES District ID: 4839780

Students and staff
- Students: 582 (2012–2013)
- Teachers: 49.27 (2011–2012) (on full-time equivalent (FTE) basis)
- Student–teacher ratio: 11.57 (2011–2012)
- Athletic conference: UIL Class AA
- District mascot: Panther
- Colors: Maroon and White

Other information
- Website: Seymour ISD

Seymour Independent School District is a public school district based in Seymour, Texas. Located in Baylor County, a small portion of the district extends into Knox County.

In 2009, the school district was rated "academically acceptable" by the Texas Education Agency.

== Schools ==
In the 2012–2013 school year, the district had students in three schools.

- Seymour High School (Grades 9–12)
- Seymour Middle School (Grades 5–8)
- Seymour Elementary School (Grades EE–4)
