= Seymour, Texas =

- City
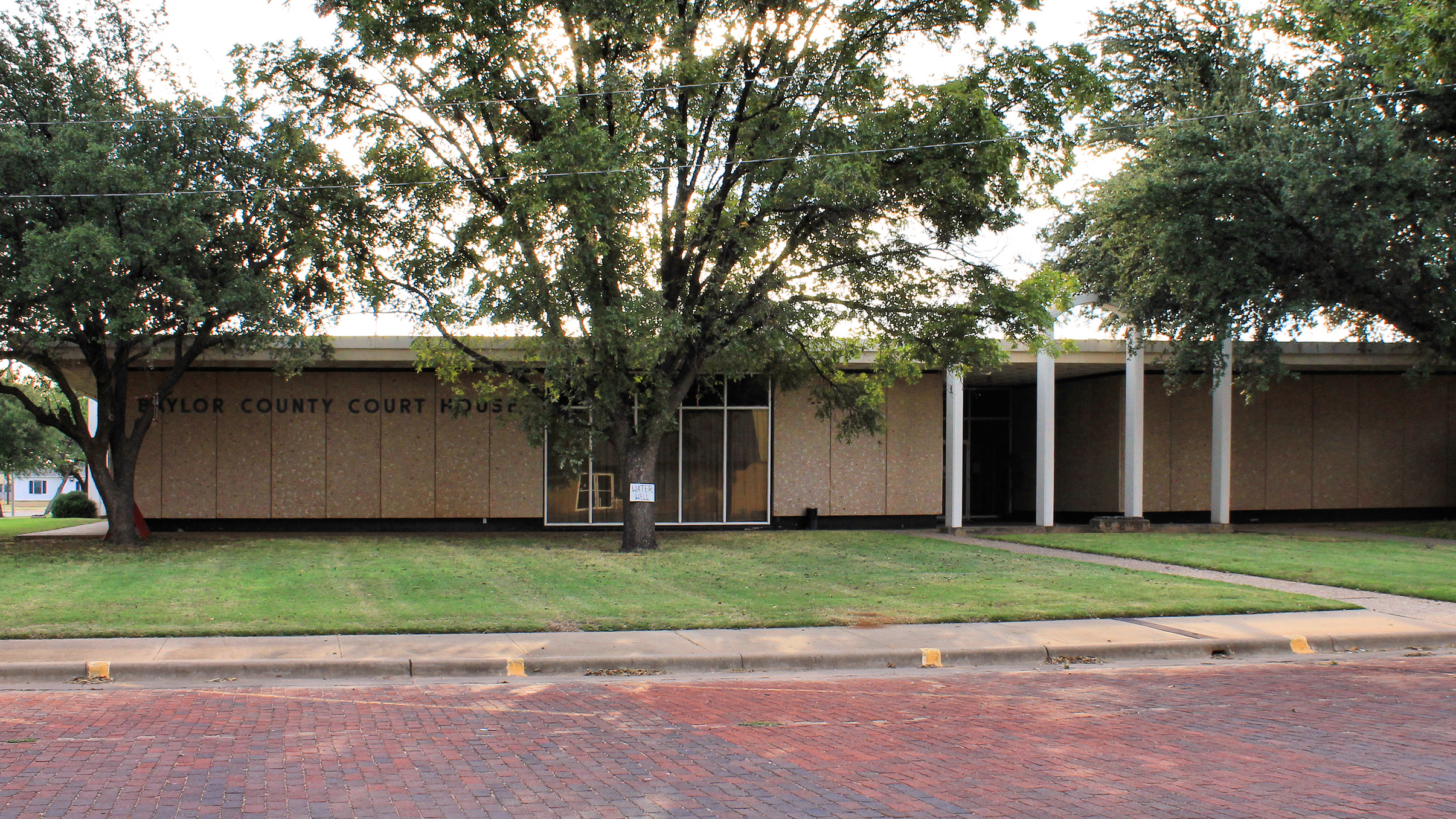
- Baylor County Courthouse in Seymour

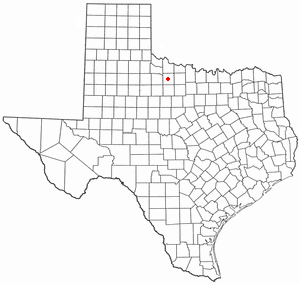
- Location of Seymour, Texas
- Coordinates: 33°35′39″N 99°15′37″W
- Country: United States
- State: Texas
- County: Baylor
- Incorporated (town): 1890 (dissolved 1892)
- Incorporated (city): 1906

Government
  - Type: Mayor-Council

Area
  - Total: 2.93 sq mi (7.59 km^{2})
  - Land: 2.92 sq mi (7.57 km^{2})
  - Water: 0.0039 sq mi (0.01 km^{2})
- Elevation: 1,289 ft (393 m)

Population (2020)
  - Total: 2,575
  - Density: 881/sq mi (340/km^{2})
- Time zone: UTC-6 (Central (CST))
  - Summer (DST): UTC-5 (CDT)
- ZIP code: 76380
- Area code: 940
- FIPS code: 48-66968
- GNIS feature ID: 2411871
- Website: www.cityofseymour.org

Seymour is a city in and the county seat of Baylor County, Texas, United States. Its population was 2,575 as of the 2020 Census.

== Geography ==
Seymour is located on the Brazos River. It is 52 miles (84 km) southwest of Wichita Falls and 102 miles (164 km) north-northeast of Abilene.

According to the United States Census Bureau, the city has a total area of 2.9 square miles (7.6 km^{2}), of which 0.004 square miles (0.01 km^{2}), or 0.20%, is covered by water.

=== Climate ===
The climate is humid subtropical (Köppen: Cfa) with an extreme temperature deviation, but much of the time, the variation is always more and the warm weather prevails over the cold as the averages and the records show. Its subtropical location and south of the center of a large land mass bring occasional outbreaks even to a latitude and not very high altitude. The climate in this area is characterized by hot, humid summers and generally mild to cool winters, sometimes cold. On August 12, 1936, Seymour witnessed the record highest temperature in Texas (120 °F) (49 °C), a record that was tied by the city of Monahans on June 28, 1994.

Climate data for Seymour, TX
Month	Jan	Feb	Mar	Apr	May	Jun	Jul	Aug	Sep	Oct	Nov	Dec	Year
Record high °F (°C)	89 (32)	93 (34)	100 (38)	103 (39)	107 (42)	115 (46)	114 (46)	120 (49)	112 (44)	106 (41)	92 (33)	90 (32)	120 (49)
Mean daily maximum °F (°C)	54.1 (12.3)	58.5 (14.7)	67.2 (19.6)	77.3 (25.2)	84.5 (29.2)	92.6 (33.7)	97.6 (36.4)	97.7 (36.5)	89.3 (31.8)	78.8 (26.0)	65.4 (18.6)	55.5 (13.1)	76.5 (24.8)
Mean daily minimum °F (°C)	27.1 (−2.7)	31.4 (−0.3)	38.8 (3.8)	48.9 (9.4)	58.4 (14.7)	67.3 (19.6)	71.2 (21.8)	70.2 (21.2)	62.4 (16.9)	50.9 (10.5)	38.1 (3.4)	29.7 (−1.3)	49.5 (9.8)
Record low °F (°C)	−14 (−26)	−9 (−23)	5 (−15)	22 (−6)	30 (−1)	47 (8)	54 (12)	50 (10)	34 (1)	20 (−7)	7 (−14)	−8 (−22)	−14 (−26)
Average precipitation inches (mm)	0.99 (25)	1.41 (36)	1.57 (40)	2.18 (55)	3.79 (96)	3.20 (81)	2.21 (56)	2.30 (58)	3.09 (78)	2.61 (66)	1.55 (39)	1.36 (35)	26.26 (665)
Average snowfall inches (cm)	0.8 (2.0)	0.6 (1.5)	0.2 (0.51)	0 (0)	0 (0)	0 (0)	0 (0)	0 (0)	0 (0)	0 (0)	0.3 (0.76)	0.4 (1.0)	2.3 (5.77)
Source: WRCC

=== Geology ===
Seymour is within the area underlain by Texas Red Beds, which are strata of red-colored sedimentary rock from the Early Permian. The fossils of Permian-period vertebrates in the Texas Red Beds were first discovered by Edward Drinker Cope in 1877. Subsequent research has revealed rare fossils of Permian amphibians such as Trimerorhachis, as well as rich deposits of other Permian tetrapods such as Dimetrodon and Diadectes. The order Seymouriamorpha and genus Seymouria, which were first discovered in the Seymour area, are named after the city.

== Demographics ==
Historical population
Census	Pop.	Note	%±
1880	183		—
1890	1,125		514.8%
1910	2,029		—
1920	2,121		4.5%
1930	2,626		23.8%
1940	3,328		26.7%
1950	3,779		13.6%
1960	3,789		0.3%
1970	3,469		−8.4%
1980	3,657		5.4%
1990	3,185		−12.9%
2000	2,908		−8.7%
2010	2,740		−5.8%
2020	2,575		−6.0%
U.S. Decennial Census 2020

=== 2020 census ===
As of the 2020 census, Seymour had a population of 2,575. The median age was 44.2 years; 24.0% of residents were under the age of 18 and 24.2% of residents were 65 years of age or older. For every 100 females there were 90.2 males, and for every 100 females age 18 and over there were 84.9 males age 18 and over.

Racial composition as of the 2020 census
Race	Number	Percent
White	2,216	86.1%
Black or African American	52	2.0%
American Indian and Alaska Native	11	0.4%
Asian	9	0.3%
Native Hawaiian and Other Pacific Islander	0	0.0%
Some other race	93	3.6%
Two or more races	194	7.5%
Hispanic or Latino (of any race)	365	14.2%

0.0% of residents lived in urban areas, while 100.0% lived in rural areas.

There were 1,129 households and 839 families residing in the city. Of all households, 28.2% had children under the age of 18 living in them, 39.7% were married-couple households, 20.6% were households with a male householder with no spouse or partner present, and 33.2% were households with a female householder with no spouse or partner present. About 37.3% of all households were made up of individuals and 19.3% had someone living alone who was 65 years of age or older.

There were 1,359 housing units, of which 16.9% were vacant. The homeowner vacancy rate was 2.5% and the rental vacancy rate was 9.6%.

=== 2010 census ===
As of the census of 2010, 2,740 people, a decrease of 5.78% since 2000 (168 people). The racial makeup of the town was 91.28% White, 2.45% African American, 0.22% Native American, 0.11% Asian, 0.11% Pacific Islander, 4.11% from other races, and 3.80% from two or more races. Hispanics or Latinos of any race were about 3.6% of the population. Of 1,451 housing units, 249 were vacant.

=== 2000 census ===
As of the census of 2000, 2,908 people, 1,273 households, and 790 families resided in the city. The population density was 1,067.5 people/sq mi (412.8/km^{2}). The 1,534 housing units averaged 563.1/sq mi (217.8/km^{2}). The racial makeup of the city was 89.24% White, 4.57% African American, 0.48% Native American, 0.72% Asian, 3.54% from other races, and 1.44% from two or more races. About 10.45% were Hispanic or Latino of any race.

Of the 1,273 households, 26.0% had children under the age of 18 living with them, 49.1% were married couples living together, 10.0% had a female householder with no husband present, and 37.9% were not families; 35.7% of all households were made up of individuals, and 21.9% had someone living alone who was 65 years of age or older. The average household size was 2.25 and the average family size was 2.90.

In the city, the age distribution was 24.3% under 18, 6.1% from 18 to 24, 20.9% from 25 to 44, 23.9% from 45 to 64, and 24.8% who were 65 or older. The median age was 44 years. For every 100 females, there were 83.2 males. For every 100 females age 18 and over, there were 79.6 males.

The median income for a household in the city was $23,662, and for a family was $32,917. Males had a median income of $21,891 versus $19,292 for females. The per capita income for the city was $16,062. About 15.6% of families and 19.5% of the population were below the poverty line, including 31.8% of those under age 18 and 10.7% of those age 65 or over.

== Education ==
Seymour is served by the Seymour Independent School District.

== History ==
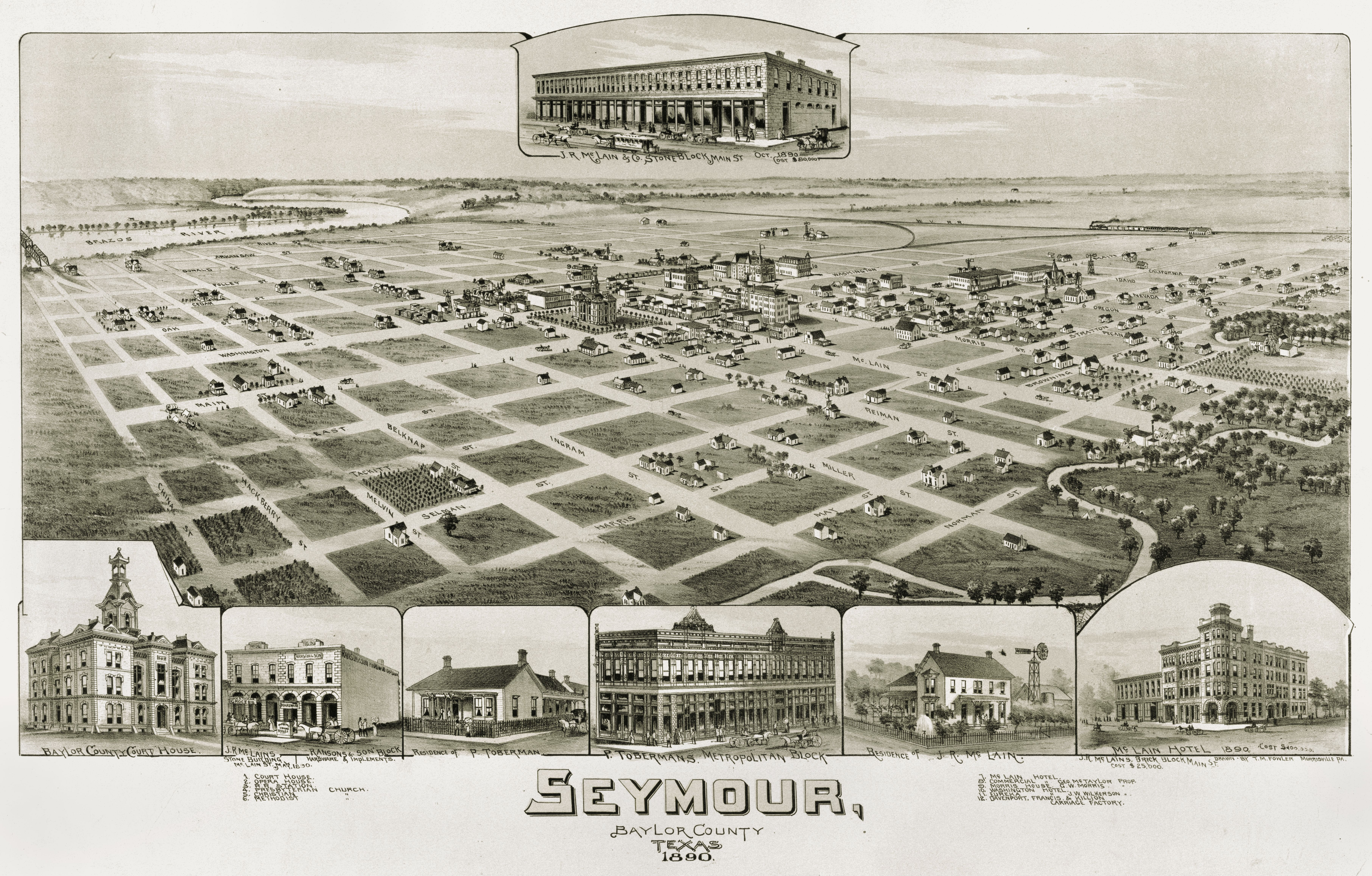
Seymour in 1890

Seymour was founded by settlers from Oregon, who called the town Oregon City; it was originally located where the Western Trail crossed the Brazos River, which flows just south of the townsite. A post office was established in 1879, when the town's name was changed to honor local cowboy Seymour Munday, after whom nearby Munday was also named. The census of 1880 shows 78 people living in the 901-square-mile county. The first settlers were ranchers. During those years, the Miller brothers established a large ranch with the headquarters some 10 miles south of Seymour on Miller Creek. About 50 men were in the Miller outfit, and some of these were reportedly outlaws. Not unusually, some of the cowboys rode into town and proceeded to "shoot it up". The Millers realized that law had come to Baylor County in 1884, and sold the ranch. It was the largest transaction ever made in northwest Texas at that time. The purchasers used the Hashknife Ranch brand, which is still in use in the county.

Commerce, a newspaper, a hotel, and the county courthouse all followed soon after, as did violence between cowboys and settlers. The town experienced two distinct economic booms; the first, short-lived, was with the construction of the Wichita Valley rail line in 1880, and the second was due to the discovery of oil in 1906. The population grew from 500 in 1884 to almost 3800 in 1950; it remained around that level for more than 30 years, but has declined since to 2,575 in the 2020 census. Agribusiness, as well as some tourism from nearby Lake Kemp, has overtaken oil as the driving factor of the local economy. The Old Settlers Reunion and Rodeo has been held each July since 1896.

The town calls itself "the crossroads of North Texas" because it is located at the junction of five highways: U.S. highways 82, 277, 183, and 283, and State Highway 114.

On August 12, 1936, the temperature at Seymour reached 120 °F (49 °C), the highest temperature ever recorded in Texas.
