= 2019 SMU Mustangs football team =

American college football season

2019 SMU Mustangs football

Boca Raton Bowl, L 28–52 vs. Florida Atlantic
- Conference: American Athletic Conference
- West Division
- Record: 10–3 (6–2 The American)
- Head coach: Sonny Dykes (2nd season)
- Offensive coordinator: Rhett Lashlee (2nd season)
- Offensive scheme: Bear raid
- Defensive coordinator: Kevin Kane (2nd season)
- Base defense: 3–4
- Home stadium: Gerald J. Ford Stadium

Uniform
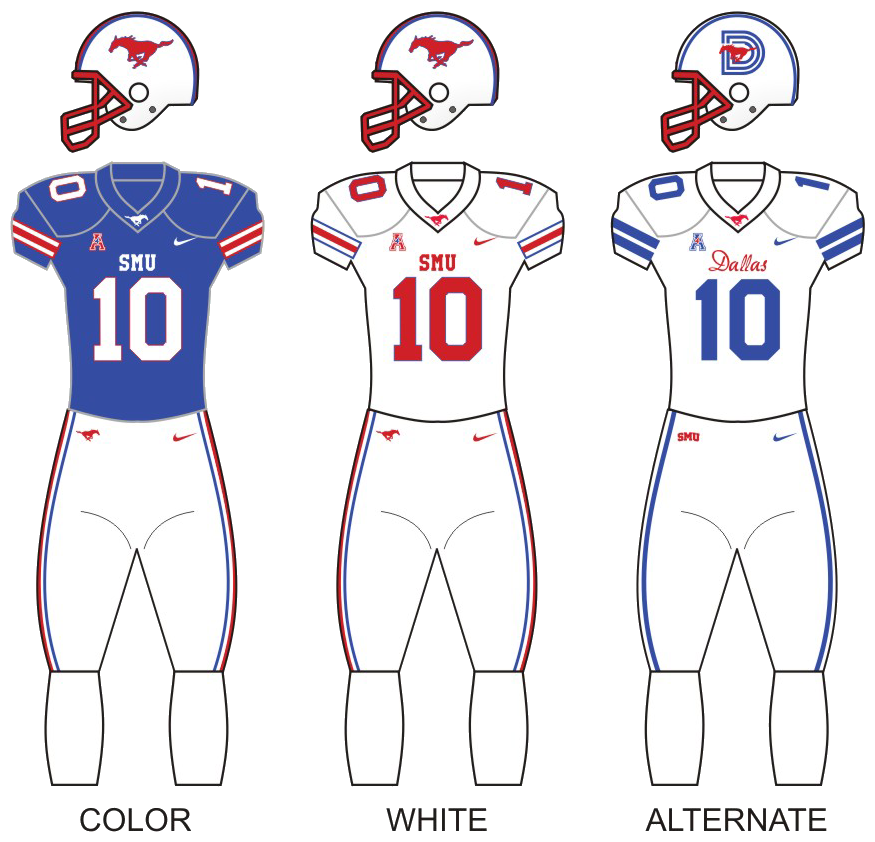

2019 American Athletic Conference football standings
	Conf.			Overall
Team	W		L	W		L
East Division
No. 21 Cincinnati xy	7	–	1	11	–	3
No. 24 UCF	6	–	2	10	–	3
Temple	5	–	3	8	–	5
South Florida	2	–	6	4	–	8
East Carolina	1	–	7	4	–	8
UConn	0	–	8	2	–	10
West Division
No. 17 Memphis xy$	7	–	1	12	–	2
No. 20 Navy x	7	–	1	11	–	2
SMU	6	–	2	10	–	3
Tulane	3	–	5	7	–	6
Houston	2	–	6	4	–	8
Tulsa	2	–	6	4	–	8
Championship: Memphis 29, Cincinnati 24
$ – Conference champion; x – Division champion/co-champions; y – Championship game participant; Rankings from AP Poll

The 2019 SMU Mustangs football team represented Southern Methodist University during the 2019 NCAA Division I FBS football season. The Mustangs were led by second-year head coach Sonny Dykes and played their home games at Gerald J. Ford Stadium in University Park, Texas, a separate city within the city limits of Dallas. They competed as members of the West Division of the American Athletic Conference.

The Mustangs started the season 8–0, their first 8–0 start to a season since 1982. The team's non-conference schedule was capped off with a 41–38 victory over rival TCU, their first victory over the Horned Frogs since 2011. Following a 48–21 victory over the South Florida Bulls in week 5, the Mustangs entered the AP Poll at no. 24, their first poll ranking since the team received the NCAA's death penalty in February 1987. The team's first loss of the season would come on November 2 against the Memphis Tigers. The team went on to play in the Boca Raton Bowl, falling to Florida Atlantic.

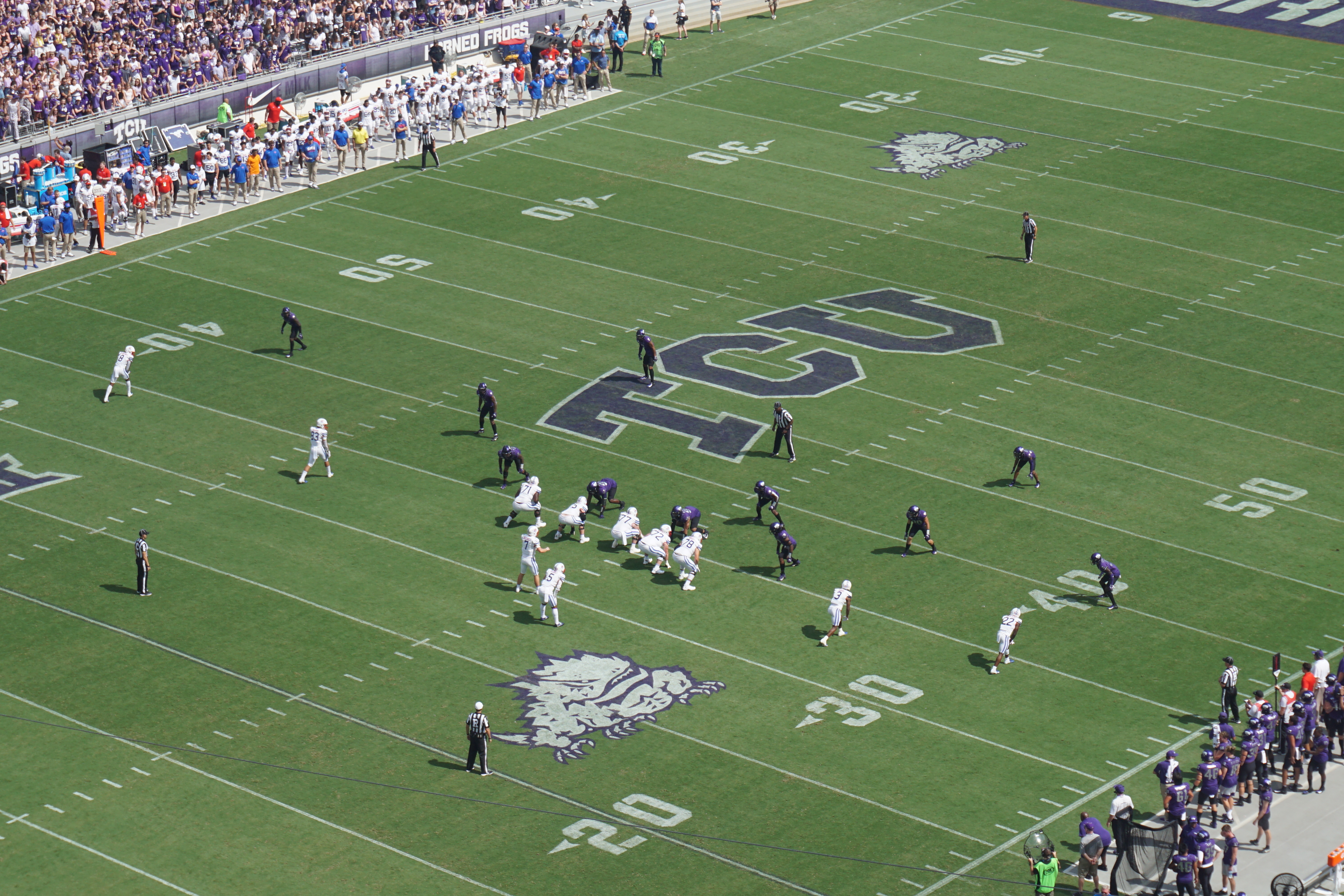
SMU in action at TCU

== Preseason ==
=== Recruiting class ===
College recruiting
Name	Hometown	School	Height	Weight	40^{‡}	Commit date
Ulysses Bentley IV; Running Back	Houston, TX	C. E. King HS	5 ft 9 in (1.75 m)	185 lb (84 kg)	-	Dec 19, 2018
Ulysses Bentley IV; Running Back	Recruit ratings: Scout: Rivals: 247Sports: ESPN:					
CeTaidrian "Tai" Brooks; Offensive lineman	Allen, TX	Allen HS	6 ft 3 in (1.91 m)	315 lb (143 kg)	-	Dec 19, 2018
CeTaidrian "Tai" Brooks; Offensive lineman	Recruit ratings: Scout: Rivals: 247Sports: ESPN:					
Cobe Bryant; Offensive lineman	Auburn Hills, MI	Rochester HS; Riverside CC	6 ft 4 in (1.93 m)	295 lb (134 kg)	-	Dec 19, 2018
Cobe Bryant; Offensive lineman	Recruit ratings: Scout: Rivals: 247Sports: ESPN:					
Keontae "Keke" Burns; Wide receiver	Pittsburg, TX	Pittsburg HS	6 ft 3 in (1.91 m)	185 lb (84 kg)	-	Dec 19, 2018
Keontae "Keke" Burns; Wide receiver	Recruit ratings: Scout: Rivals: 247Sports: ESPN:					
Elijah Chatman; Defensive tackle	Shreveport, LA	Evangel Christian Academy	6 ft 0 in (1.83 m)	270 lb (120 kg)	-	Dec 19, 2018
Elijah Chatman; Defensive tackle	Recruit ratings: Scout: Rivals: 247Sports: ESPN:					
Donald Clay; Safety	New Orleans, LA	John Curtis HS	6 ft 0 in (1.83 m)	190 lb (86 kg)	-	Dec 19, 2018
Donald Clay; Safety	Recruit ratings: Scout: Rivals: 247Sports: ESPN:					
Chace Cromartie; Safety	Cibolo, TX	Steele HS	6 ft 0 in (1.83 m)	170 lb (77 kg)	-	Dec 19, 2018
Chace Cromartie; Safety	Recruit ratings: Scout: Rivals: 247Sports: ESPN:					
Luke Evans; Inside linebacker	Liberty, TX	Liberty HS	5 ft 8 in (1.73 m)	186 lb (84 kg)	-	Feb 6, 2019
Luke Evans; Inside linebacker	Recruit ratings: Scout: Rivals: 247Sports: ESPN:					
Carson Garrett; Kicker	Dallas, TX	Bishop Lynch HS	5 ft 8 in (1.73 m)	186 lb (84 kg)	-	Feb 6, 2019
Carson Garrett; Kicker	Recruit ratings: Scout: Rivals: 247Sports: ESPN:					
Terrance Gipson; Quarterback	Houston, TX	Westfield HS	6 ft 0 in (1.83 m)	190 lb (86 kg)	-	Dec 19, 2018
Terrance Gipson; Quarterback	Recruit ratings: Scout: Rivals: 247Sports: ESPN:					
Danielson Ike; Offensive guard	Kansas City, MO	Rockhurst HS	6 ft 5 in (1.96 m)	320 lb (150 kg)	-	Feb 6, 2019
Danielson Ike; Offensive guard	Recruit ratings: Scout: Rivals: 247Sports: ESPN:					
T. J. McDaniel; Running back	Southlake, TX	Carroll HS	5 ft 11 in (1.80 m)	187 lb (85 kg)	-	Feb 6, 2019
T. J. McDaniel; Running back	Recruit ratings: Scout: Rivals: 247Sports: ESPN:					
Henry Mossberg; Offensive guard	Southlake, TX	Carroll HS	6 ft 3 in (1.91 m)	260 lb (120 kg)	-	Feb 6, 2019
Henry Mossberg; Offensive guard	Recruit ratings: Scout: Rivals: 247Sports: ESPN:					
Nelson Paul; Defensive end	Bunnell, FL	Flagler Palm Coast HS	6 ft 2 in (1.88 m)	210 lb (95 kg)	-	Dec 19, 2018
Nelson Paul; Defensive end	Recruit ratings: Scout: Rivals: 247Sports: ESPN:					
Rashee Rice; Wide receiver	North Richland Hills, TX	Richland HS	6 ft 2 in (1.88 m)	180 lb (82 kg)	-	Dec 19, 2018
Rashee Rice; Wide receiver	Recruit ratings: Scout: Rivals: 247Sports: ESPN:					
Roderick Roberson Jr. Safety	Royse City, TX	Royse City HS	6 ft 0 in (1.83 m)	170 lb (77 kg)	-	Dec 19, 2018
Roderick Roberson Jr. Safety	Recruit ratings: Scout: Rivals: 247Sports: ESPN:					
Parker Stone; Wide receiver	Dallas, TX	Parish Episcopal	5 ft 11 in (1.80 m)	180 lb (82 kg)	-	Feb 6, 2019
Parker Stone; Wide receiver	Recruit ratings: Scout: Rivals: 247Sports: ESPN:					
Warren Walls; Defensive end	Dallas, TX	Bishop Lynch HS	6 ft 4 in (1.93 m)	220 lb (100 kg)	-	Dec 19, 2018
Warren Walls; Defensive end	Recruit ratings: Scout: Rivals: 247Sports: ESPN:					
Sam Westfall; Cornerback	Saint George, UT	Dixie HS; Mesa CC	5 ft 11 in (1.80 m)	175 lb (79 kg)	-	Dec 19, 2020
Sam Westfall; Cornerback	Recruit ratings: Scout: Rivals: 247Sports: ESPN:					
Calvin Wiggins; Wide receiver	Trophy Club, TX	Bryon Nelson HS	6 ft 3 in (1.91 m)	190 lb (86 kg)	-	Dec 19, 2020
Calvin Wiggins; Wide receiver	Recruit ratings: Scout: Rivals: 247Sports: ESPN:					

=== Award watch lists ===
Listed in the order that they were released

Award	Player	Position	Year
Maxwell Award	James Proche	WR	Sr
AFCA Good Words Award	Demerick Gary	DT	Sr
Biletnikoff Award	James Proche	WR	Sr
Biletnikoff Award	Reggie Roberson, Jr.	WR	Sr
Rimington Trophy	Hayden Howerton	OL	Jr
Paul Hornung Award	James Proche	WR	Sr
Wuerffel Trophy	Tyler Page	WR	Jr
Earl Campbell Tyler Rose Award	James Proche	WR	Sr
Earl Campbell Tyler Rose Award	Reggie Roberson, Jr.	WR	Sr
Earl Campbell Tyler Rose Award	Shane Buechele	QB	Sr

=== AAC media poll ===
The AAC media poll was released on July 16, 2019, with the Mustangs predicted to finish fourth in the AAC West Division.

=== Preseason All-AAC teams ===
SMU placed nine players to the All-AAC team, sanctioned by Athlon Sports.

Offense

1st team

- James Proche – Sr, wide receiver

3rd team

- Reggie Roberson Jr. – Jr, wide receiver

4th team

- Shane Buechele – Jr, quarterback
- Xavier Jones – Sr, running back
- Hayden Howerton – Jr, center

Defensive

2nd team

- Delontae Scott – Sr, defensive lineman
- Richard moore – Sr, linebacker
- Rodney clemons – Sr, safety

Special teams

4th team

- James proche – Sr, punt returner

== Schedule ==
SMU's 2019 schedule would begin with four non-conference games: first on the road against Arkansas State of the Sun Belt Conference, then at home against North Texas of Conference USA, then at home against Texas State, also of the Sun Belt Conference, and finally on the road against cross-town rival TCU of the Big 12 Conference. In American Athletic Conference play, the Mustangs would play the other members of the West Division and draw East Carolina, South Florida, and Temple from the East Division. They would not play Cincinnati, Connecticut, or UCF as part of the regular season.

Date	Time	Opponent	Rank	Site	TV	Result	Attendance
August 31	6:00 p.m.	at Arkansas State*		Centennial Bank Stadium; Jonesboro, AR	ESPN+	W 37–30	22,076
September 7	6:00 p.m.	North Texas*		Gerald J. Ford Stadium; University Park, TX (Safeway Bowl)	ESPN3	W 49–27	22,766
September 14	6:00 p.m.	Texas State*		Gerald J. Ford Stadium; University Park, TX	ESPN3	W 47–17	17,469
September 21	2:30 p.m.	at No. 25 TCU*		Amon G. Carter Stadium; Fort Worth, TX (Battle for the Iron Skillet)	FS1	W 41–38	41,250
September 28	3:00 p.m.	at South Florida		Raymond James Stadium; Tampa, FL	ESPNU	W 48–21	28,850
October 5	6:30 p.m.	Tulsa	No. 24	Gerald J. Ford Stadium; University Park, TX	ESPNU	W 43–37 ^{3OT}	28,142
October 19	2:30 p.m.	Temple	No. 19	Gerald J. Ford Stadium; University Park, TX	ESPN2	W 45–21	23,132
October 24	6:30 p.m.	at Houston	No. 16	TDECU Stadium; Houston, TX (rivalry)	ESPN	W 34–31	24,543
November 2	6:30 p.m.	at No. 24 Memphis	No. 15	Liberty Bowl Memorial Stadium; Memphis, TN (College GameDay)	ABC	L 48–54	59,506
November 9	11:00 a.m.	East Carolina^{†}	No. 25	Gerald J. Ford Stadium; University Park, TX	ESPNU	W 59–51	29,528
November 23	2:30 p.m.	at Navy	No. 25	Navy–Marine Corps Memorial Stadium; Annapolis, MD (Gansz Trophy)	CBSSN	L 28–35	33,732
November 30	3:00 p.m.	Tulane		Gerald J. Ford Stadium; University Park, TX	ESPNU	W 37–20	20,761
December 21	2:30 p.m.	at Florida Atlantic*		FAU Stadium; Boca Raton, FL (Boca Raton Bowl)	ABC	L 28–52	23,187
*Non-conference game; ^{†}Homecoming; Rankings from AP Poll and CFP Rankings after November 5 released prior to game; All times are in Central time

== Roster ==
2019 SMU Mustangs football team roster
Players
Coaches
Offense

Pos.	#	Name	Class
WR	1	C. J. Sanders	Sr
RB	2	Ke'Mon Freeman	Sr
WR	3	James Proche (C)	Sr
WR	4	Tyler Page	Jr
RB	5	Xavier Jones	Sr
QB	6	Omari Ross	Fr
QB	7	Shane Buechele (C)	Jr
WR	8	Reggie Roberson Jr.	Jr
QB	9	William Brown	So
QB	10	Terrance Gipson	Fr
WR	11	Rashee Rice	Fr
QB	12	Derek Green	Fr
WR	13	Judah Bell	So
TE	14	Ryan Becker	Sr
WR	15	Calvin Wiggins	Fr
WR	16	Keke Burns	Fr
WR	17	Austin Upshaw	So
QB	18	Jacob Oehrlein	Fr
RB	20	Cameron Rosenberger	Fr
RB	21	TaMerik Williams	Fr
WR	22	Myron Gailliard	Sr
RB	25	T. J. McDaniel	Fr
RB	26	Ulysses Bentley IV	Fr
RB	30	Tyler Lavine	Fr
RB	31	Merek Pierce	Sr
WR	40	Ben Palmer	Fr
WR	42	Beau Barker	Fr
TE	44	Kedrick James	Jr
WR	47	Walker French	Fr
WR	48	Devan Reck-Irvin	Fr
OL	57	Cobe Bryant	Jr
OL	58	Patrick Jones	Jr
OL	59	Tai Brooks	Fr
OL	60	Carter Foster	Fr
OL	63	Charlie Flores	Sr
OL	64	Cameron Ervin	Fr
OL	65	Thomas Shelmire	Fr
OL	66	Sam Burns	Fr
OL	70	Kadarius Smith	Jr
OL	71	Jaylon Thomas	So
OL	72	Nick Dennis	Sr
OL	74	Braxton Webb	Jr
OL	75	Hayden Howerton	Jr
OL	77	Alan Ali	So
OL	78	Beau Morris	Jr
OL	79	Danielson Ike	Fr
TE	81	Ben Redding	So
TE	83	Kylen Granson	Jr
WR	84	Matt Dorrity	So
WR	85	Keith Jones	Fr
TE	86	Tommy McIntyre	Jr
TE	88	Carson Welch	Fr
TE	99	Cody Banks	Jr

Defense

Pos.	#	Name	Class
CB	1	Eric Sutton	Sr
S	2	Patrick Nelson	Sr
LB	3	Delano Robinson	Jr
CB	5	Ar'mani Johnson	So
CB	6	Sam Westfall	So
CB	7	Robert Hayes Jr.	Sr
LB	9	Shaine Hailey	Jr
DT	10	Demerick Gary	Sr
CB	11	Chevin Calloway	So
CB	12	Kevin Johnson	Sr
S	13	Roderick Roberson Jr.	Fr
LB	14	Richard Moore (C)	Sr
S	15	Treveon Johnson	So
S	16	Trevor Denbow	Jr
DB	17	Cam'ron Jones	Fr
S	18	Chace Cromartie	Fr
S	20	Collin Rock	Jr
S	21	Donald Clay	Fr
DE	22	Tyeson Neals	Jr
S	23	Rodney Clemons (C)	Sr
LB	24	Jimmy Phillips Jr.	So
LB	25	Myles Duke	Jr
DB	26	Brandon Stephens	Jr
S	27	Michael Salerno	So
CB	28	Christian Davis	Sr
CB	29	Justin Guy-Robinson	So
LB	30	Kyle Blaskovich	So
LB	31	Armando Fitz	So
LB	32	J. C. Rispress	So
LB	33	Jordan Ward	Jr
S	34	Brice Madison	Jr
DE	35	Delontae Scott	Sr
CB	36	Terry Keys III	Fr
DE	38	Toby Ndukwe	So
DT	39	Darren Brown	Fr
DE	40	Noah Spears	Jr
LB	41	Preston Ellison	So
S	42	Ra-Sun Kazadi	Fr
LB	43	Brian Holloway	So
DT	44	Harrison Loveless	So
LB	45	Luke Evans	Fr
DE	46	Garnett March II	Fr
S	47	Hunter Ballard	Fr
CB	49	Marcus Nesby	Fr
LB	50	Richard McBryde	Sr
DT	51	Pono Davis	Sr
LB	52	Deuce Palmer	Fr
LB	53	Garrett Madison	Fr
DE	54	Gerrit Choate	Jr
DE	55	Gary Wiley	So
LB	57	Ben Furgal	Fr
LB	58	Eli Furgal	Fr
LB	59	Will Goldberg	Fr
LB	60	Reid Stacy	Fr
DE	61	Jack Young	Fr
LB	62	Daniel Stecker	Fr
LB	67	Nick Lerew	Fr
DT	68	Chris Buggers	Sr
DL	89	Alex Sickafoose	Fr
DE	90	Nelson Paul	Fr
DT	91	Terrance Newman	So
DT	92	Shabazz Dotson	Fr
DT	93	Elijah Chatman	Fr
DT	95	Will Jones	Jr
DT	96	Zach Abercrumbia	Sr
DE	97	Turner Coxe	So
DT	98	Jacob Pugh	Jr

Special teams

Pos.	#	Name	Class
K	32	Jack Hansing	Jr
K	44	Charles Cannon	So
K	46	Luke Hogan	Jr
P	47	Jamie Sackville	Sr
LS	49	Cole Voyles	Fr
LS	50	Mark Fuchs	Fr
K, P	89	Kevin Robledo	Sr
K	93	Kevin Miles	Jr
K	94	Wills Thompson III	Fr
P	95	Nick Lang	Fr
K	96	Austin Dennis	Fr
P	97	Russell Roberts	Fr
P	99	Warren Scott	Fr

Head coach

- Sonny Dykes (Texas Tech)

Coordinators/assistant coaches

- Kevin Kane (Kansas)
  Defensive coordinator/LB
- Rhett Lashlee (Texas Tech)
  Offensive coordinator/QB
- Josh Martin (Tarleton State)
  Special teams coordinator/TE
- Chris Brasfield (TCU)
  Recruiting coordinator/RB
- Kevin Curtis (Texas Tech)
  CB
- David Gru (California)
  Wide receivers
- Trey Haverty (TCU)
  Safeties
- Randall Joyner (SMU)
  Defensive line
- A. J. Ricker (Missouri)
  Offensive line
- Ra'Shaad Samples (Houston)
  Assistant coach
- Jonathan Brewer (Arkansas)
  Offensive quality control/Offensive analyst

Legend

- (C) Team captain
- (S) Suspended
- (I) Ineligible
- Injured
- Redshirt

Roster
Last update: June 24, 2020

== Game summaries ==
=== At Arkansas State ===
Southern Methodist at Arkansas State – Game summary

Quarter	1	2	3	4	Total
Mustangs	3	13	14	7	37
Red Wolves	7	2	14	7	30

at Centennial Bank Stadium, Jonesboro, AR

- Date: August 31
- Game time: 6:00 p.m. CDT
- Game weather: 88 °F (31 °C); mostly sunny
- Game attendance: 22,076
- Referee: Jason Autrey
- TV: ESPN+

Game information

First quarter

- (13:08) ARST TD – Omar Bayless 7-yard pass from Logan Bonner, Blake Grupe kick
  Arkansas State 7–0; Drive: 1 play, 7 yards, 0:04
- (08:45) SMU FG – Kevin Robledo 34-yard field goal
  Arkansas State 7–3; Drive: 14 plays, 53 yards, 4:17

Second quarter

- (14:01) ARST SF – Team safety
  Arkansas State 9–3; Drive: 2 plays, -12 yards, 0:36
- (07:08) SMU TD – Xavier Jones 9-yard rush, Kevin Robledo kick
  Southern Methodist 10–9; Drive: 13 plays, 92 yards, 5:03
- (03:53) SMU FG – Kevin Robledo 29-yard field goal
  Southern Methodist 13–9; Drive: 7 plays, 27 yards, 2:29
- (00:29) SMU FG – Kevin Robledo 25-yard field goal
  Southern Methodist 16–9; Drive: 10 plays, 47 yards, 1:55

Third quarter

- (13:41) ARST TD – Omar Bayless 8-yard pass from Logan Bonner, Blake Grupe kick
  Tied 16–16; Drive: 6 plays, 69 yards, 1:11
- (07:36) ARST TD – Omar Bayless 29-yard pass from Logan Bonner, Blake Grupe kick
  Arkansas State 23–16; Drive: 7 plays, 98 yards, 3:03
- (07:22) SMU TD – CJ Sanders 98-yard kickoff returned, Kevin Robledo PAT failed
  Arkansas State 23–22; Drive: 0 plays, 0 yards, 0:00
- (00:44) SMU TD – Xavier Jones 1-yard rush, Tyler Page two point conversion pass to Kylen Granson
  Southern Methodist 30–23; Drive: 9 plays, 51 yards, 3:36

Fourth quarter

- (09:11) SMU TD – Xavier Jones 2-yard rush, Kevin Robledo kick
  Southern Methodist 37–23; Drive: 11 plays, 89 yards, 4:55
- (05:59) ARST TD – Omar Bayless 34-yard pass from Logan Bonner, Blake Grupe kick
  Southern Methodist 37–30; Drive: 11 plays, 75 yards, 3:12

Top passers

- SMU – Shane Buechele – 30/49, 360 yards, INT
- ARST – Logan Bonner – 32/50, 324 yards, 4 TD, INT

Top rushers

- SMU – Ke'Mon Freeman – 22 carries, 86 yards
- ARST – Marcel Murray – 17 carries, 77 yards

Top receivers

- SMU – Reggie Roberson Jr. – 11 receptions, 180 yards
- ARST – Omar Bayless – 10 receptions, 132 yards, 4 TD

Statistics	SMU	Arkansas State
First downs	29	25
Total yards	508	414
Rushing yards	148	90
Passing yards	360	324
Turnovers	1	3
Time of possession	35:14	24:46

=== North Texas ===
North Texas at Southern Methodist – Game summary

Quarter	1	2	3	4	Total
Mean Green	0	14	6	7	27
Mustangs	21	7	14	7	49

at Gerald J. Ford Stadium, University Park, TX

- Date: September 7
- Game time: 6:00 p.m. CDT
- Game weather: 100 °F (38 °C); sunny
- Game attendance: 22,766
- Referee: Billy Williams
- TV: ESPN3

Game information

First quarter

- (12:15) SMU TD – Reggie Roberson Jr. 5-yard pass from Shane Buechele, Kevin Robledo kick
  Southern Methodist 7–0; Drive: 9 play, 75 yards, 2:45
- (07:26) SMU TD – Xavier Jones 24-yard rush, Kevin Robledo PAT failed
  Southern Methodist 13–0; Drive: 9 play, 83 yards, 2:47
- (03:21) SMU TD – Ke'Mon Freeman 2-yard rush, Shane Buechele two-point conversion pass to James Proche
  Southern Methodist 21–0; Drive: 4 play, 45 yards, 1:12

Second quarter

- (10:30) UNT TD – Tre Siggers 1-yard rush, Ethan Mooney kick
  Southern Methodist 21–7; Drive: 6 play, 80 yards, 2:10
- (04:50) SMU TD – Reggie Roberson Jr. 31-yard pass from Shane Buechele, Russell Roberts kick
  Southern Methodist 28–7; Drive: 6 play, 57 yards, 2:40
- (02:30) UNT TD – Michael Lawrence 8-yard pass from Mason Fine, Ethan Mooney kick
  Southern Methodist 28–14; Drive: 6 play, 70 yards, 2:41

Third quarter

- (10:01) UNT FG – Ethan Mooney 26-yard field goal
  Southern Methodist 28–17; Drive: 11 play, 83 yards, 4:55
- (07:37) SMU TD – Xavier Jones 10-yard rush, Russell Roberts kick
  Southern Methodist 35–17; Drive: 9 play, 76 yards, 2:15
- (02:28) UNT FG – Ethan Mooney 36-yard field goal
  Southern Methodist 35–20; Drive: 12 play, 56 yards, 5:09
- (00:50) SMU TD – Xavier Jones 51-yard rush, Russell Roberts kick
  Southern Methodist 42–20; Drive: 5 play, 77 yards, 1:30

Fourth quarter

- (09:59) SMU TD – James Proche 11-yard pass from Shane Buechele, Russell Roberts kick
  Southern Methodist 49–20; Drive: 8 play, 71 yards, 3:22
- (01:54) UNT TD – Jaelon Darden 5-yard pass from Jason Bean, Ethan Mooney kick
  Southern Methodist 49–27; Drive: 9 play, 54 yards, 2:40

Top passers

- UNT – Mason Fine – 17/32, 152 yards, TD, INT
- SMU – Shane Buechele – 21/31, 292 yards, 3 TD

Top rushers

- UNT – Tre Siggers – 18 carries, 164 yards, TD
- SMU – Xavier Jones – 16 carries, 127 yards, 3 TD

Top receivers

- UNT – Jaelon Darden – 6 receptions, 59 yards, TD
- SMU – James Proche – 7 receptions, 115 yards, TD

Statistics	North Texas	SMU
First downs	21	25
Total yards	396	503
Rushing yards	211	211
Passing yards	185	292
Turnovers	1	1
Time of possession	34:44	25:16

=== Texas State ===
Texas State at Southern Methodist – Game summary

Quarter	1	2	3	4	Total
Bobcats	3	0	7	7	17
Mustangs	7	6	21	13	47

at Gerald J. Ford Stadium, University Park, TX

- Date: September 14
- Game time: 6:00 p.m. CDT
- Game weather: 97 °F (36 °C); partly cloudy
- Game attendance: 17,469
- Referee: A. Calabrese
- TV: ESPN3

Game information

First quarter

- (11:47) SMU TD – James Proche 4-yard pass from Shane Buechele, Luke Hogan kick
  Southern Methodist 7–0; Drive: 7 plays, 74 yards, 3:13
- (08:13) TXST FG – Joshua Rowland 27-yard field goal
  Southern Methodist 7–3; Drive: 4 plays, 9 yards, 1:17

Second quarter

- (13:02) SMU TD – TJ McDaniel 10-yard rush, Luke Hogan PAT blocked
  Southern Methodist 13–3; Drive: 6 plays, 78 yards, 2:09

Third quarter

- (12:44) SMU TD – Xavier Jones 1-yard rush, Luke Hogan kick
  Southern Methodist 20–3; Drive: 4 plays, 64 yards, 1:09
- (07:26) SMU TD – TJ McDaniel 39-yard rish, Luke Hogan kick
  Southern Methodist 27–3; Drive: 4 plays, 64 yards, 1:30
- (04:29) TXST TD – Anthony D. Taylor 10-yard pass from Gresch Jensen, Joshua Rowland kick
  Southern Methodist 27–10; Drive: 7 plays, 65 yards, 2:57
- (00:06) SMU TD – TJ McDaniel 42-yard rush, Luke Hogan kick
  Southern Methodist 34–10; Drive: 3 plays, 51 yards, 1:09

Fourth quarter

- (12:32) SMU TD – Kylen Granson 58-yard pass from Shane Buechele, Luke Hogan PAT failed
  Southern Methodist 40–10; Drive: 1 play, 58 yards, 0:10
- (05:50) TXST TD – Caleb Twyford 35-yard pass from Tyler Vitt, Joshua Rowland kick
  Southern Methodist 40–17; Drive: 3 plays, 37 yards, 1:02
- (00:38) SMU TD – Merek Pierce 4-yard rush, Luke Hogan kick
  Southern Methodist 47–17; Drive: 10 plays, 68 yards, 5:11

Top passers

- TXST – Gresch Jensen – 22/37, 185 yards, TD, INT
- SMU – Shane Buechele – 14/18, 219 yards, 2 TD, 2 INT

Top rushers

- TXST – Caleb Twyford – 11 carries, 25 yards
- SMU – TJ McDaniel – 8 carries, 159 yards, 3 TD

Top receivers

- TXST – Caleb Twyford – 3 receptions, 53 yards, TD
- SMU – Reggie Roberson Jr. – 4 receptions, 68 yards

Statistics	Texas State	SMU
First downs	15	23
Total yards	241	639
Rushing yards	16	390
Passing yards	225	249
Turnovers	1	3
Time of possession	29:06	30:54

With the victory, the Mustangs improved to 3–0, their first 3–0 start since the 1984 season.

=== At TCU ===
Southern Methodist at Texas Christian – Game summary

Quarter	1	2	3	4	Total
Mustangs	18	13	0	10	41
No. 25 Horned Frogs	7	10	7	14	38

at Amon G. Carter Stadium, Fort Worth, TX

- Date: September 21
- Game time: 2:30 p.m. CDT
- Game weather: 93 °F (34 °C); partly cloudy
- Game attendance: 41,250
- Referee: Adam Savoie
- TV: FoxSports1

Game information

First quarter

- (13:42) SMU TD – Shane Buechele 4-yard rush, Luke Hogan kick
  Southern Methodist 7–0; Drive: 5 plays, 65 yards, 1:18
- (05:56) SMU TD – Xavier Jones 1-yard rush, Ke'Mon Freeman two-point conversion rush
  Southern Methodist 15–0; Drive: 3 plays, 4 yards, 1:06
- (02:57) TCU TD – Darius Anderson 14-yard rush, Jonathan Song kick
  Southern Methodist 15–7; Drive: 8 plays, 60 yards, 2:59
- (00:00) SMU FG – Luke Hogan 38-yard field goal
  Southern Methodist 18–7; Drive: 4 plays, 2 yards, 1:06

Second quarter

- (13:05) TCU TD – Darius Anderson 3-yard rush, Jonathan Song kick
  Southern Methodist 18–14; Drive: 2 plays, 80 yards, 0:44
- (07:44) SMU TD – Ke'Mon Freeman 1-yard rush, Luke Hogan PAT failed
  Southern Methodist 24–14; Drive: 7 plays, 67 yards, 2:01
- (03:28) TCU FG – Jonathan Song 29-yard field goal
  Southern Methodist 24–17; Drive: 9 plays, 37 yards, 4:08
- (00:13) SMU TD – James Proche 9-yard pass from Shane Buechele, Russell Roberts kick
  Southern Methodist 31–17; Drive: 9 plays, 58 yards, 3:08

Third quarter

- (07:09) TCU TD – Pro Wells 12-yard pass from Max Duggan, Jonathan Song kick
  Southern Methodist 31–24; Drive: 4 plays, 23 yards, 1:27

Fourth quarter

- (13:58) SMU TD – Xavier Jones 3-yard pass from Shane Buechele, Russell Roberts kick
  Southern Methodist 38–24; Drive: 10 plays, 83 yards, 3:05
- (09:43) TCU TD – Sewo Olonilua 5-yard pass from Max Duggan, Jonathan Song kick
  Southern Methodist 38–31; Drive: 5 plays, 69 yards, 1:15
- (06:36) SMU FG – Russell Roberts 32-yard field goal
  Southern Methodist 41–31; Drive: 10 plays, 60 yards, 3:07
- (03:37) TCU TD – Pro Wells 13-yard pass from Max Duggan, Jonathan Song kick
  Southern Methodist 41–38; Drive: 12 plays, 77 yards, 2:50

Top passers

- SMU – Shane Buechele – 23/34, 288 yards, 2 TD, INT
- TCU – Max Duggan – 16/36, 188 yards, 3 TD

Top rushers

- SMU – Xavier Jones – 19 carries, 79 yards, TD
- TCU – Darius Anderson – 19 carries, 161 yards, 2 TD

Top receivers

- SMU – Reggie Roberson Jr. – 4 receptions, 122 yards
- TCU – Dylan Thomas – 4 receptions, 70 yards

Statistics	SMU	TCU
First downs	16	23
Total yards	406	424
Rushing yards	118	236
Passing yards	288	188
Turnovers	1	3
Time of possession	29:55	30:05

The Mustangs built a 15–0 lead in the 1st quarter and never trailed in the game. SMU lead 31–17 at halftime, but the Horned Frogs rallied in the 2nd half to trail by 3 points late in the 4th. The Mustangs held on and stopped the comeback attempt, winning 41–38. This is SMU's first win over TCU since 2011.

=== At South Florida ===
Southern Methodist at South Florida – Game summary

Quarter	1	2	3	4	Total
Mustangs	14	20	7	7	48
Bulls	0	0	7	14	21

at Raymond James Stadium, Tampa, FL

- Date: September 28
- Game time: 3:00 p.m. CDT
- Game attendance: 28,850
- Referee: Tra Blake
- TV: ESPNU

Game information

First quarter

- (09:58) SMU TD – Xavier Jones 9-yard rush, Russell Roberts kick
  Southern Methodist 7–0; Drive: 5 plays, 62 yards, 1:23
- (01:56) SMU TD – Xavier Jones 36-yard rush, Russell Roberts kick
  Southern Methodist 14–0; Drive: 6 plays, 80 yards, 1:59

Second quarter

- (12:56) SMU TD – James Proche 6-yard pass from Shane Buechele, Russell Roberts kick
  Southern Methodist 21–0; Drive: 9 plays, 80 yards, 3:19
- (09:22) SMU TD – Reggie Roberson Jr. 31-yard pass from Shane Buechele, Russell Roberts kick
  Southern Methodist 28–0; Drive: 5 plays, 59 yards, 1:09
- (07:30) SMU TD – James Proche 19-yard pass from Shane Buechele, Russell Roberts PAT failed
  Southern Methodist 34–0; Drive: 3 plays, 58 yards, 0:44

Third quarter

- (02:30) SMU TD – Shane Buechele 10-yard rush, Russell Roberts kick
  Southern Methodist 41–0; Drive: 9 plays, 50 yards, 4:10
- (00:26) USF TD – Jacob Mathis 24-yard pass from Blake Barnett, Coby Weiss kick
  Southern Methodist 41–7; Drive: 5 plays, 75 yards, 2:04

Fourth quarter

- (10:40) USF TD – Bryce Miller 13-yard pass from Blake Barnett, Coby Weiss kick
  Southern Methodist 41–14; Drive: 4 plays, 83 yards, 1:12
- (05:01) SMU TD – Tyler Lavine 1-yard rush, Kevin Robledo kick
  Southern Methodist 48–14; Drive: 10 plays, 75 yards, 5:39
- (02:57) USF TD – Mitchell Wilcox 7-yard pass from Blake Barnett, Coby Weiss kick
  Southern Methodist 48–21; Drive: 5 plays, 82 yards, 2:04

Top passers

- SMU – Shane Buechele – 21/25, 226 yards, 3 TD, INT
- USF – Blake Barnett – 13/21, 222 yards, 3 TD

Top rushers

- SMU – Xavier Jones – 15 carries, 155 yards, 2 TD
- USF – Jordan Cronkrite – 8 carries, 30 yards

Top receivers

- SMU – James Proche – 7 receptions, 96 yards, 2 TD
- USF – Mitchell Wilcox – 4 receptions, 77 yards, TD

Statistics	SMU	South Florida
First downs	31	22
Total yards	497	342
Rushing yards	245	54
Passing yards	252	288
Turnovers	2	2
Time of possession	31:48	28:12

=== Tulsa ===
Tulsa at Southern Methodist – Game summary

Quarter	1	2	3	4	OT	2OT	3OT	Total
Golden Hurricane	3	20	7	0	7	0	0	37
No. 24 Mustangs	6	3	0	21	7	0	6	43

at Gerald J. Ford Stadium, University Park, TX

- Date: October 5
- Game time: 6:30 p.m. CDT
- Game weather: 93 °F (34 °C); mostly sunny
- Game attendance: 28,142
- Referee: Edwin Lee
- TV: ESPNU

Game information

First quarter

- (08:13) SMU TD – Ar'mani Johnson 64-yard interception returned, Kevin Robledo PAT blocked
  Southern Methodist 6–0; Drive: 5 plays, 30 yards, 1:02
- (04:16) TUL FG – Jacob Rainey 32-yard field goal
  Southern Methodist 6–3; Drive: 9 plays, 38 yards, 3:57

Second quarter

- (13:46) TUL TD – Keylon Stokes 58-yard pass from Zach Smith, Jacob Rainey kick
  Tulsa 10–6; Drive: 4 plays, 69 yards, 1:27
- (13:45) TUL TD – Kendarian Ray 1-yard fumble returned, Jacob Rainey PAT blocked kick
  Tulsa 16-6; Drive: 0 plays, 00 yards, 0:00
- (07:34) SMU FG – Kevin Robledo 32-yard field goal
  Tulsa 16–9; Drive: 7 plays, 17 yards, 1:40
- (05:23) TUL TD – Keylon Stokes 5-yard from Zach Smith, Jacob Rainey kick
  Tulsa 23–9; Drive: 5 plays, 71 yards, 2:11

Third quarter

- (11:47) TUL TD – Keenen Johnson 40-yard pass from Zach Smith, Jacob Rainey kick
  Tulsa 30–9; Drive: 7 plays, 68 yards, 3:13

Fourth quarter

- (14:56) SMU TD – Ke'Mon Freeman 1-yard rush, Kevin Robledo kick
  Tulsa 30–16; Drive: 19 plays, 73 yards, 7:35
- (08:24) SMU TD – James Proche 30-yard from Shane Buechele, Kevin Robledo kick
  Tulsa 30–23; Drive: 10 plays, 92 yards, 3:01
- (01:02) SMU TD – Xavier Jones 4-yard rush, Kevin Robledo kick
  Tied 30–30; Drive: 14 plays, 80 yards, 4:29

First overtime

- TUL td – Josh Johnson 7-yard pass from Zach Smith, Jacob Rainey kick
  Tulsa 37–30; Drive: 5 plays, 25 yards
- SMU td – Xavier Jones 3-yard rush, Kevin Robledo kick
  Tied 37–37; Drive: 5 plays, 25 yards

Third overtime

- SMU td – James Proche 25-yard pass from Shane Buechele
  Southern Methodist 43–37; Drive: 1 play, 25 yards

Top passers

- TUL – Zach Smith – 23/41, 346 yards, 4 TD, 3 INT
- SMU – Shane Buechele – 23/40, 280 yards, 2 TD

Top rushers

- TUL – Shamari Brooks – 16 carries, 95 yards
- SMU – Xavier Jones – 26 carries, 121 yards, 2 TD

Top receivers

- TUL – Keylon Stokes – 5 receptions, 101 yards, 2 TD
- SMU – James Proche – 11 receptions, 153 yards, 2 TD

Statistics	Tulsa	SMU
First downs	22	26
Total yards	500	437
Rushing yards	154	127
Passing yards	346	310
Turnovers	3	1
Time of possession	29:22	30:38

=== Temple ===
Temple at Southern Methodist – Game summary

Quarter	1	2	3	4	Total
RV Owls	0	7	7	7	21
No. 19 Mustangs	10	14	7	14	45

at Gerald J. Ford Stadium, University Park, TX

- Date: October 19
- Game time: 2:30 p.m. CDT
- Game weather: 83 °F (28 °C); sunny
- Game attendance: 23,123
- Referee: Mike Roche
- TV: ESPN2

Game information

First quarter

- (11:21) SMU TD – Reggie Roberson Jr. 33-yard pass from Shane Buechele, Kevin Robeldo kick
  Southern Methodist 7–0; Drive: 11 plays, 77 yards, 3:39
- (07:46) SMU FG – Kevin Robeldo 22-yard field goal
  Southern Methodist 10–0; Drive: 9 plays, 68 yards, 2:46

Second quarter

- (07:15) SMU TD – Reggie Roberson Jr. 75-yard pass from Shane Buechele, Kevin Robeldo kick
  Southern Methodist 17–0; Drive: 4 plays, 86 yards, 1:22
- (05:14) TEM TD – Re'Mahn Davis 1-yard rush, Will Mobley kick
  Southern Methodist 17–7; Drive: 7 plays, 65 yards, 2:01
- (00:20) SMU TD – James Proche 10-yard pass from Shane Buechele, Kevin Robeldo kick
  Southern Methodist 24–7; Drive: 9 plays, 68 yards, 1:45

Third quarter

- (12:38) TEM TD – Branden Mack 25-yard pass from Anthony Ruso, Will Mobley kick
  Southern Methodist 24–14; Drive: 7 plays, 58 yards, 2:22
- (08:22) SMU TD – Kylen Granson 10-yard pass from Shane Buechele, Kevin Robeldo kick
  Southern Methodist 31–14; Drive: 14 plays, 82 yards, 4:16

Fourth quarter

- (13:09) TEM TD – Anthony Russo 1-yard rush, Will Mobley kick
  Southern Methodist 31–21; Drive: 10 plays, 80 yards, 2:50
- (11:54) SMU TD – Reggie Roberson Jr. 60-yard pass from Shane Buechele, Kevin Robeldo kick
  Southern Methodist 38–21; Drive: 4 plays, 75 yards, 1:15
- (07:21) SMU TD – Xavier Jones 5-yard pass from Shane Buechele, Kevin Robeldo kick
  Southern Methodist 45–21; Drive: 7 plays, 52 yards, 2:20

Top passers

- TEM – Anthony Russo – 18/32, 171 yards, TD
- SMU – Shane Buechele – 30/53, 457 yards, 6 TD, INT

Top rushers

- TEM – Re'Mahn Davis – 16 carries, 54 yards, TD
- SMU – Xavier Jones – 29 carries, 105 yards

Top receivers

- TEM – Branden Mack – 3 receptions, 65 yards, TD
- SMU – Reggie Roberson Jr. – 8 receptions, 250 yards, 3 TD

Statistics	Temple	SMU
First downs	14	34
Total yards	273	655
Rushing yards	69	198
Passing yards	204	457
Turnovers	1	1
Time of possession	25:45	34:15

=== At Houston ===
Southern Methodist at Houston – Game summary

Quarter	1	2	3	4	Total
No. 16 Mustangs	7	14	10	3	34
Cougars	0	13	7	11	31

at TDECU Stadium, Houston, TX

- Date: October 24
- Game time: 6:30 p.m. CDT
- Game weather: 76 °F (24 °C); partly cloudy
- Game attendance: 24,543
- Referee: A. Calabrese
- TV: ESPN

Game information

First quarter

- (01:33) SMU TD – James Proche 15-yard pass from Shane Buechele, Kevin Robledo kick
  Southern Methodist 7–0; Drive: 7 plays, 85 yards, 2:03

Second quarter

- (14:28) HOU TD – Bryson Smith 1-yard rush, Dalton Witherspoon kick
  Tied 7–7; Drive: 5 plays, 88 yards, 2:05
- (10:41) SMU TD – Xavier Jones 62-yard rush, Kevin Robledo kick
  Southern Methodist 14–7; Drive: 2 plays, 83 yards, 0:29
- (08:14) SMU TD – Kylen Granson 11-yard pass from Shane Buechele, Kevin Robledo kick
  Southern Methodist 21–7; Drive: 5 plays, 32 yards, 1:03
- (01:56) HOU FG – Dalton Witherspoon 25-yard field goal
  Southern Methodist 21–10; Drive: 14 plays, 67 yards, 6:18
- (00:00) HOU FG – Dalton Witherspoon 34-yard field goal
  Southern Methodist 21–13; Drive: 5 plays, 29 yards, 1:46

Third quarter

- (14:13) SMU TD – Xavier Jones 2-yard rush, Kevin Robledo kick
  Southern Methodist 28–13; Drive: 1 play, 2 yards, 0:04
- (14:01) HOU TD – Marquez Stevenson 75-yard pass from Clayton Tune, Dalton Witherspoon kick
  Southern Methodist 28–20; Drive: 1 play, 75 yards, 0:12
- (10:56) SMU FG – Kevin Robledo 23-yard field goal
  Southern Methodist 31–20; Drive: 7 plays, 53 yards, 3:05

Fourth quarter

- (14:10) HOU FG – Dalton Witherspoon 40-yard field goal
  Southern Methodist 31–23; Drive: 9 plays, 71 yards, 3:36
- (08:56) SMU FG – Kevin Robledo 33-yard field goal
  Southern Methodist 34–23; Drive: 6 plays, 65 yards, 2:00
- (04:47) HOU TD – Marquez Stevenson 96-yard pass from Clayton Tune, Clayton Tune two-point conversion pass to Christian Trahan
  Southern Methodist 34–31; Drive: 1 play, 96 yards, 0:12

Top passers

- SMU – Shane Buechele – 20/38, 203 yards, 2 TD, INT
- HOU – Clayton Tune – 18/33, 407 yards, 2 TD, INT

Top rushers

- SMU – Xavier Jones – 22 carries, 133 yards, 2 TD
- HOU – Mulbah Car – 18 carries, 136 yards

Top receivers

- SMU – James Proche – 7 receptions, 83 yards, TD
- HOU – Marquez Stevenson – 5 receptions, 211 yards, 2 TD

Statistics	SMU	Houston
First downs	22	22
Total yards	385	514
Rushing yards	182	107
Passing yards	203	407
Turnovers	1	3
Time of possession	28:13	31:37

=== At Memphis ===
Southern Methodist at Memphis – Game summary

Quarter	1	2	3	4	Total
No. 15 Mustangs	7	10	7	24	48
No. 24 Tigers	7	16	17	14	54

at Liberty Bowl Memorial Stadium, Memphis, TN

- Date: November 2
- Game time: 6:30 p.m. CDT
- Game weather: 49 °F (9 °C); clear
- Game attendance: 59,506
- Referee: Adam Savoie
- TV announcers (ABC): Chris Fowler (play-by-play), Kirk Herbstreit (analyst) and Maria Taylor (sideline)

Game information

First quarter

- (05:49) SMU TD – Kylen Granson 16-yard pass from Shane Buechele, Kevin Robledo kick
  Southern Methodist 7–0; Drive: 12 plays, 97 yards, 3:49
- (03:34) MEM TD – Kenneth Gainwell 14-yard rush, Riley Patterson kick
  Tied 7–7; Drive: 5 plays, 50 yards, 2:15

Second quarter

- (13:38) MEM FG – Riley Patterson 30-yard field goal
  Memphis 10–7; Drive: 9 plays, 58 yards, 3:19
- (11:30) SMU TD – Xavier Jones 2-yard rush, Kevin Robledo kick
  Southern Methodist 14–10; Drive: 7 plays, 53 yards, 2:08
- (09:24) MEM FG – Riley Patterson 49-yard field goal
  Southern Methodist 14–13; Drive: 5 plays, 14 yards, 2:06
- (05:44) MEM TD – Antonio Gibson 50-yard pass from Brady White, Riley Patterson kick
  Memphis 20–14; Drive: 4 plays, 56 yards, 1:56
- (03:42) SMU FG – Kevin Robledo 23-yard field goal
  Memphis 20–17; Drive: 7 plays, 67 yards, 2:02
- (00:12) MEM FG – Riley Patterson 34-yard field goal
  Memphis 23–17; Drive: 11 plays, 37 yards, 3:30

Third quarter

- (14:50) MEM TD – Antonio Gibson 97-yard kickoff returned, Riley Patterson kick
  Memphis 30–17; Drive: 0 plays, 0 yards, 0:00
- (12:46) SMU TD – Ke'Mon Freeman 2-yard rush, Kevin Robledo kick
  Memphis 30–24; Drive: 7 plays, 77 yards, 2:04
- (08:43) MEM FG – Riley Patterson 50-yard field goal
  Memphis 33–24; Drive: 9 plays, 27 yards, 4:03
- (02:14) MEM TD – Damonte Coxie 24-yard pass from Brady White, Riley Patterson kick
  Memphis 40–24; Drive: 9 plays, 98 yards, 3:17

Fourth quarter

- (12:49) SMU TD – Kylen Granson 30-yard pass from Shane Buechele, Shane Buechele two-point conversion pass to Rashee Rice
  Memphis 40–32; Drive: 2 plays, 48 yards, 0:22
- (11:36) MEM TD – Damonte Coxie 49-yard pass from Brady White, Riley Patterson kick
  Memphis 47–32; Drive: 2 plays, 54 yards, 1:13
- (09:31) MEM TD – Antonio Gibson 78-yard rush, Riley Patterson kick
  Memphis 54–32; Drive: 1 play, 78 yards, 0:16
- (08:07) SMU TD – Ke'Mon Freeman 68-yard rush, Shane Buechele two-point conversion pass to Rashee Rice
  Memphis 54–40; Drive: 3 plays, 75 yards, 1:24
- (02:06) SMU TD – James Proche 2-yard pass from Shane Buechele, Jaylon Thomas two-point conversion rush
  Memphis 54–48; Drive: 12 plays, 84 yards, 3:14

Top passers

- SMU – Shane Buechele – 34/54, 456 yards, 3 TD
- MEM – Brady White – 19/33, 350 yards, 3 TD

Top rushers

- SMU – Ke'Mon Freeman – 6 carries, 74 yards, 2 TD
- MEM – Antonio Gibson – 3 carries, 97 yards, TD

Top receivers

- SMU – James Proche – 13 receptions, 149 yards, TD
- MEM – Damonte Coxie – 7 receptions, 143 yards, 2 TD

Statistics	SMU	Memphis
First downs	27	26
Total yards	553	514
Rushing yards	97	164
Passing yards	456	350
Turnovers	0	0
Time of possession	27:01	32:59

Memphis hosted the Mustangs in the first-ever College GameDay appearance for the Tigers, and just the second for SMU. The Mustangs jumped out to an early lead in front of the sold-out crowd, and the two teams traded scores to reach halftime with a 17-23 score in favor of Memphis. The Tigers never trailed in the second half, although the Mustangs drew within one score on a Shane Buechele pass to James Proche and Jaylon Thomas's two-point conversion late in the fourth quarter. Memphis handed SMU its first loss of the season.

=== East Carolina ===
East Carolina at Southern Methodist – Game summary

Quarter	1	2	3	4	Total
Pirates	7	13	17	14	51
No. 25 Mustangs	14	14	17	14	59

at Gerald J. Ford Stadium, University Park, TX

- Date: November 9
- Game time: 11:00 a.m. CDT
- Game weather: 57 °F (14 °C); sunny
- Game attendance: 29,528
- Referee: Henry Johns
- TV: ESPNU

Game information

First quarter

- (12:44) SMU TD – Kylen Granson 22-yard pass from Shane Buechele, Kevin Robledo kick
  Southern Methodist 7–0; Drive: 8 plays, 75 yards, 2:16
- (07:20) ECU TD – Jsi Hatfield 68-yard pass from Holton Ahlers, Jake Verity kick
  Tied 7–7; Drive: 3 plays, 70 yards, 0:42
- (03:51) SMU TD – Kylen Granson 4-yard pass from Shane Buechele, Kevin Robledo kick
  Southern Methodist 14–7; Drive: 9 plays, 75 yards, 3:29

Second quarter

- (11:06) ECU FG – Jake Verity 38-yard field goal
  Southern Methodist 14–10; Drive: 9 plays, 34 yards, 3:39
- (07:28) SMU TD – Xavier Jones 3-yard rush, Kevin Robledo kick
  Southern Methodist 21–10; Drive: 11 plays, 75 yards, 3:38
- (04:45) SMU TD – James Proche 51-yard pass from Shane Buechele, Kevin Robledo kick
  Southern Methodist 28–10; Drive: 3 plays, 66 yards, 1:02
- (02:04) ECU TD – Tyler Snead 36-yard pass from Holton Ahlers, Jake Verity kick
  Southern Methodist 28–17; Drive: 6 plays, 73 yards, 2:37
- (00:00) SMU FG – Jake Verity 37-yard field goal
  Southern Methodist 28–20; Drive: 7 plays, 60 yards, 1:00

Third quarter

- (13:53) ECU TD – Zech Byrd 45-yard pass from Holton Ahlers, Jake Verity kick
  Southern Methodist 28–27; Drive: 3 plays, 75 yards, 1:07
- (12:01) SMU TD – Xavier Jones 35-yard rush, Kevin Robledo kick
  Southern Methodist 35–27; Drive: 7 plays, 75 yards, 1:52
- (08:06) ECU TD – Tyler Snead 47-yard pass from Holton Ahlers, Jake Verity kick
  Southern Methodist 35–34; Drive: 8 plays, 75 yards, 3:55
- (05:34) SMU FG – Kevin Robledo 23-yard field goal
  Southern Methodist 38–34; Drive: 7 plays, 47 yards, 2:22
- (01:56) ECU FG – Jake Verity 41-yard field goal
  Southern Methodist 38–37; Drive: 10 plays, 51 yards, 3:38
- (00:19) SMU TD – Xavier Jones 64-yard rush, Kevin Robledo kick
  Southern Methodist 45–37; Drive: 4 plays, 75 yards, 1:29

Fourth quarter

- (10:58) ECU TD – Tyler Snead 57-yard pass from Holton Ahlers, Jake Verity kick
  Southern Methodist 45–44; Drive: 10 plays, 97 yards, 4:20
- (07:25) SMU TD – Kylen Granson 31-yard pass from Shane Buechele, Kevin Robledo kick
  Southern Methodist 52–44; Drive: 9 plays, 75 yards, 3:40
- (04:18) SMU TD – James Proche 3-yard pass from Shane Buechele, Kevin Robledo kick
  Southern Methodist 59–44; Drive: 6 plays, 22 yards, 3:00
- (01:55) ECU TD – Audie Omotosho 22-yard pass from Holton Ahlers, Jake Verity kick
  Southern Methodist 59–51; Drive: 8 plays, 72 yards, 2:16

Top passers

- ECU – Holton Ahlers – 32/42, 498 yards, 6 TD
- SMU – Shane Buechele – 33/46, 414 yards, 5 TD, INT

Top rushers

- ECU – Tay Williams – 14 carries, 61 yards
- SMU – Xavier Jones – 20 carries, 157 yards, 3 TD

Top receivers

- ECU – Tyler Snead – 19 receptions, 240 yards, 3 TD
- SMU – James Proche – 14 receptions, 167 yards, 2 TD

Statistics	East Carolina	SMU
First downs	27	33
Total yards	644	636
Rushing yards	146	222
Passing yards	498	414
Turnovers	1	1
Time of possession	31:05	28:55

=== At Navy ===
Southern Methodist at Navy – Game summary

Quarter	1	2	3	4	Total
No. 25 Mustangs	7	14	0	7	28
Midshipmen	7	3	10	15	35

at Navy–Marine Corps Memorial Stadium, Annapolis, MD

- Date: November 23
- Game time: 2:30 p.m. CDT
- Game weather: Temperature: 43 °F (6 °C) • Wind: S 3-5 mph • Weather: Overcast Skies
- Game attendance: 33,732
- Referee: Mike Roche
- TV announcers (CBS Sports Network): John Sadak (play-by-play), Randy Cross (analyst) & Sheehan Stanwick-Burch (sideline)

Game information

First quarter

- (02:36) NAVY TD – Chance Warren 22-yard rush, Bijan Nichols kick
  Navy 7–0; Drive: 8 plays, 65 yards, 3:28
- (02:21) SMU TD – CJ Sanders 100-yard kickoff returned, Kevin Robledo kick
  Tied 7–7; Drive: 0 plays, 0 yards, 0:00

Second quarter

- (11:44) NAVY FG – Bijan Nichols 41-yard field goal
  Navy 10–7; Drive: 11 plays, 51 yards, 5:37
- (06:22) SMU TD – James Proche 8-yard pass from Shane Buechele, Kevin Robledo kick
  Southern Methodist 14–10; Drive: 12 plays, 75 yards, 5:22
- (04:01) SMU TD – Xavier Jones 9-yard rush, Kevin Robledo kick
  Southern Methodist 21–10; Drive: 2 plays, 42 yards, 0:22

Third quarter

- (08:58) NAVY TD – Malcolm Perry 1-yard rush, Bijan Nichols kick
  Southern Methodist 21–17; Drive: 13 plays, 75 yards, 6:02
- (04:04) NAVY FG – Bijan Nichols 24-yard field goal
  Southern Methodist 21–20; Drive: 9 plays, 73 yards, 4:22

Fourth quarter

- (14:19) NAVY TD – Ryan Mitchell 13-yard pass from Malcolm Perry, Malcolm Perry two-point conversion pass to CJ Williams
  Navy 28–21; Drive: 10 plays, 76 yards, 3:48
- (12:14) SMU TD – Rashee Rice 61-yard pass from Shane Buechele, Kevin Robledo kick
  Tied 28–28; Drive: 6 plays, 85 yards, 2:05
- (06:11) NAVY TD – Malcolm Perry 70-yard rush, Bijan Nichols kick
  Navy 35–28; Drive: 3 plays, 70 yards, 0:50

Top passers

- SMU – Shane Buechele – 16/28, 251 yards, 2 TD
- NAVY – Malcolm Perry – 9/15, 162 yards, TD

Top rushers

- SMU – Xavier Jones – 18 carries, 61 yards, TD
- NAVY – Malcolm Perry – 38 carries, 195 yards, 2 TD

Top receivers

- SMU – Rashee Rice – 3 receptions, 76 yards, TD
- NAVY – Ryan Mitchell – 3 receptions, 48 yards, TD

Statistics	SMU	Navy
First downs	15	28
Total yards	344	540
Rushing yards	93	378
Passing yards	251	162
Turnovers	1	0
Time of possession	20:20	39:40

=== Tulane ===
Tulane at Southern Methodist – Game summary

Quarter	1	2	3	4	Total
Green Wave	7	3	7	3	20
Mustangs	14	7	0	16	37

at Gerald J. Ford Stadium, University Park, TX

- Date: November 30
- Game time: 3:00 p.m. CDT
- Game weather: 71 °F (22 °C); sunny
- Game attendance: 20,761
- Referee: Adam Savoie
- TV: ESPNU

Game information

First quarter

- (07:57) SMU TD – Myron Gailliard 30-yard pass from Shane Buechele, Kevin Robledo kick
  Southern Methodist 7–0; Drive: 5 plays, 67 yards, 1:38
- (03:49) SMU TD – Kylen Granson 8-yard pass from Shane Buechele, Kevin Robledo kick
  Southern Methodist 14–0; Drive: 2 plays, 8 yards, 0:12
- (00:01) TULN TD – Cameron Carroll 3-yard rush, Merek Glover kick
  Southern Methodist 14–7; Drive: 9 plays, 60 yards, 3:41

Second quarter

- (02:32) SMU TD – Xavier Jones 1-yard rush, Kevin Robledo kick
  Southern Methodist 21–7; Drive: 4 plays, 14 yards, 1:20
- (00:00) TULN FG – Merek Glover 33-yard field goal
  Southern Methodist 21–10; Drive: 14 plays, 64 yards, 2:21

Third quarter

- (06:46) TULN TD – Corey Dauphine 35-yard rush, Merek Glover kick
  Southern Methodist 21–17; Drive: 6 plays, 83 yards, 1:45

Fourth quarter

- (10:23) SMU TD – James Proche 26-yard pass from Shane Buechele, two-point conversion rush attempt failed
  Southern Methodist 27–17; Drive: 13 plays, 93 yards, 4:32
- (07:28) SMU TD – Xavier Jones 25-yard rush, Kevin Robledo kick
  Southern Methodist 34–17; Drive: 4 plays, 37 yards, 1:30
- (04:48) TULN FG – Merek Glover 42-yard field goal
  Southern Methodist 34–20; Drive: 8 plays, 52 yards, 2:33
- (03:02) SMU FG – Kevin Robledo 25-yard field goal
  Southern Methodist 37–20; Drive: 6 plays, 22 yards, 1:41

Top passers

- TULN – Justin McMillan – 22/37, 242 yards
- SMU – Shane Buechele – 15/27, 180 yards, 3 TD, INT

Top rushers

- TULN – Corey Dauphine – 10 carries, 52 yards, TD
- SMU – Xavier Jones – 18 carries, 125 yards, 2 TD

Top receivers

- TULN – Tyrick James – 5 receptions, 62 yards
- SMU – James Proche – 7 receptions, 71 yards, TD

Statistics	Tulane	SMU
First downs	26	18
Total yards	465	377
Rushing yards	223	197
Passing yards	242	180
Turnovers	2	1
Time of possession	36:09	23:51

=== At Florida Atlantic (Boca Raton Bowl) ===
Southern Methodist at Florida Atlantic – Game summary

Quarter	1	2	3	4	Total
Mustangs	0	14	0	14	28
Owls	7	21	14	10	52

at FAU Stadium, Boca Raton, FL

- Date: December 21
- Game time: 2:30 p.m. CDT
- Game weather: Cloudy • Temperature: 76 °F (24 °C) • Wind: E 21 mph
- Game attendance: 23,187
- Referee: Kyle Olson
- TV announcers (ABC): Tom Hart (play-by-play), Joey Galloway (analyst) and Pat McAfee (sideline)

Game information

First quarter

- (03:11) FAU TD – BJ Emmons 1-yard rush, Vladimir Rivas kick
  Florida Atlantic 7–0; Drive: 13 plays, 74 yards, 3:17

Second quarter

- (14:05) SMU TD – Xavier Jones 1-yard rush, Kevin Robledo kick
  Tied 7–7; Drive: 6 plays, 29 yards, 1:04
- (07:48) FAU TD – James Charles 1-yard rush, Vladimir Rivas kick
  Florida Atlantic 14–7; Drive: 7 plays, 57 yards, 2:07
- (02:12) SMU TD – Xavier Jones 1-yard rush, Kevin Robledo kick
  Tied 14–14; Drive: 14 plays, 55 yards, 5:36
- (01:00) FAU TD – James Charles 15-yard rush, Vladimir Rivas kick
  Florida Atlantic 21–14; Drive: 7 plays, 75 yards, 1:12
- (00:36) FAU TD – Brandon Robinson 13-yard pass from Chris Robison, Vladimir Rivas kick
  Florida Atlantic 28–14; Drive: 1 play, 13 yards, 0:06

Third quarter

- (06:23) FAU TD – John Raine 18-yard pass from Chris Robison, Vladimir Rivas kick
  Florida Atlantic 35–14; Drive: 6 plays, 71 yards, 2:09
- (04:05) FAU TD – Rashad Smith 34-yard fumble returned, Vladimir Rivas kick
  Florida Atlantic 42–14; Drive: 6 plays, 12 yards, 2:18

Fourth quarter

- (13:09) FAU FG – Vladimir Rivas 38-yard field goal
  Florida Atlantic 45–14; Drive: 8 plays, 41 yards, 3:02
- (10:08) SMU TD – Ryan Becker 2-yard pass from Ke'Mon Freeman, Kevin Robledo kick
  Florida Atlantic 45–21; Drive: 7 plays, 75 yards, 3:01
- (03:17) FAU TD – Javion Posey 23-yard pass from Nick Tronti, Vladimir Rivas kick
  Florida Atlantic 52–21; Drive: 11 plays, 75 yards, 6:51
- (01:07) SMU TD – James Proche 22-yard pass from Shane Buechele kick
  Florida Atlantic 52–28; Drive: 7 plays, 77 yards, 2:10

Top passers

- SMU – Shane Buechele – 27/47, 303 yards, TD, INT
- FAU – Chris Robison – 27/37, 305 yards, 2 TD

Top rushers

- SMU – Ke'Mon Freeman – 15 carries, 52 yards
- FAU – BJ Emmons – 17 carries, 72 yards, TD

Top receivers

- SMU – Kylen Granson – 7 receptions, 93 yards
- FAU – Brandon Robinson – 5 receptions, 78 yards, TD

Statistics	SMU	Florida Atlantic
First downs	24	30
Total yards	425	521
Rushing yards	120	188
Passing yards	305	333
Turnovers	2	1
Time of possession	28:56	31:04

== Statistics ==
=== Scoring ===
Scores against non-conference opponents

	1	2	3	4	Total
Opponents	17	26	34	35	112
SMU	49	39	49	37	174

Scores against the AAC

	1	2	3	4	OT	2OT	3OT	Total
Opponents	10	43	31	28	7	0	0	119
SMU	37	47	14	76	7	0	6	187

Scores against all opponents

	1	2	3	4	OT	2OT	3OT	Total
Opponents	27	69	65	49	7	0	0	217
SMU	86	86	63	65	7	0	6	313

== Rankings ==
Ranking movements Legend: ██ Increase in ranking ██ Decrease in ranking — = Not ranked RV = Received votes
	Week																
Poll	Pre	1	2	3	4	5	6	7	8	9	10	11	12	13	14	15	Final
AP	—	—	—	—	RV	24	21	19	16	15	23	20	21	RV	RV	RV	RV
Coaches	—	—	—	RV	RV	RV	22	19	17	14	23	20	21	RV	RV	RV	RV
CFP	Not released										25	—	25	—	—	—	Not released

== Awards ==
=== All-American Athletic Conference Football Team ===
Offense

1st team

- James Proche – Sr, Wide Receiver
- Shane Buechele – Jr, Quarterback
- Xavier Jones – Sr, Running Back

2nd team

- Jaylon Thomas – SO, Offensive Tackle
- Kylen Granson – Jr, Tight End

Defensive

1st team

- Patrick Nelson – Sr, Linebacker

2nd team

- Delontae Scott – Sr, Defensive Lineman
- Rodney clemons – Sr, Safety

Special teams

2nd team

- C. J. Sanders – Sr, Return Specialist

== Players drafted into the NFL ==
Round	Pick	Player	Position	NFL club
6	201	James Proche	WR	Baltimore Ravens
