= Center Point, Camp County, Texas =

Center Point
- Unincorporated community
- Location within the state of Texas Center Point (the United States)
- Coordinates: 32°57′51″N 94°49′49″W
- Country: United States
- State: Texas
- County: Camp
- Elevation: 331 ft (101 m)
- Time zone: UTC-6 (Central (CST))
  - Summer (DST): UTC-5 (CDT)
- Area code: 903, 430
- FIPS code: 48
- GNIS feature ID: 2034805

Center Point is an unincorporated community settled in 1865 by freed slaves. It is located in Camp County in the U.S. state of Texas, nine miles southeast of Pittsburg at the intersection of Farm to Market Road 2057 and County Road 4247. In 1979, Recorded Texas Historic Landmark No. 9790 was designated to commemorate the founding of Center Point.

== Settlement ==
Center Point was settled by freed slaves in 1865 as one of the Freedman's settlements that resulted from the Emancipation Proclamation. The origin of the settlement's name is said to be from Farm to Market Road 2057 crossing County Road 4247. The 1983 county highway map showed two churches, a cemetery, and a community center. It had a population of 41 in 2000. The Center Point Baptist Church was established in 1873. The community supported a brick kiln, sawmill, and cotton gin.

== School ==
A one-room school established in 1887 served thirty-one black children, during each 100-day term. The school, however, was initially not a very good one. Later school bond improvements brought the educational institution up in 1916 to a four-room building, raising the school quality to one of the best in Camp County by 1936. The first school principals on the 14-acre campus were Mr. and Mrs. L. B. Cash. At its peak, the school accommodated 279 students. Because of the declining community population and enrollment, Center Point High School consolidated with Pittsburg Independent School District in 1955. In 1996, Recorded Texas Historic Landmark No. 9791 was designated to commemorate the school.

== Cemetery ==
The Texas Historical Commission has noted Center Point Cemetery as CP-C010.

== Notable person ==
- Barbara Smith Conrad: Mezzo-soprano Conrad has performed with opera companies around the world.

== See also ==
- Center Point (disambiguation), for other places called Center Point in Texas
