= Newsome, Texas =

- Unincorporated community
- Location within Texas Location within the United States
- Coordinates: 32°58′38″N 95°08′20″W
- Country: United States
- State: Texas
- County: Camp
- Elevation: 459 ft (140 m)
- Time zone: UTC-6 (Central (CST))
  - Summer (DST): UTC-5 (CDT)
- Area codes: 903 & 430
- GNIS feature ID: 1342572

Newsome is an unincorporated community in Camp County, in the U.S. state of Texas. According to the Handbook of Texas, the community had a population of 100 in 2000.

== History ==
Newsome's population was estimated as 113 in 2019.

== Geography ==
Newsome is located along the intersection of the Louisiana and Arkansas Railway and Texas State Highway 11, 10 mi (16 km) southwest of Pittsburg and 24 mi (39 km) southwest of Mount Pleasant in western Camp County.

== Education ==
Newsome is served by the Pittsburg Independent School District.
