= Center Point =

Center Point, Centre Point, Centerpoint may refer to:

== Places in the United States ==
- Center Point, Alabama
- Center Point, Howard County, Arkansas
- Center Point, Georgia
- Center Point, Indiana
- Center Point, Iowa
- Center Point, Louisiana
- Center Point, Missouri
- Center Point, New Mexico
- Center Point, Pennsylvania
- Center Point, Camp County, Texas
- Center Point, Kerr County, Texas
- Center Point, Tarrant County, Texas
- Center Point, West Virginia
- Centerpoint, Ohio

== Buildings and shopping centers ==
- Centerpoint Medical Center, a hospital in Independence, Missouri, United States
- Shops at CenterPoint, in Grand Rapids, Michigan, United States
- Sydney Tower, also known as Centrepoint Tower, in Sydney, New South Wales, Australia
- SM City Sta. Mesa, formerly SM Centerpoint, a shopping mall in Manila, Philippines
- The Centrepoint, a shopping centre in Singapore
- Centre Point, a building in central London, England
- Centre Point Sabah, a shopping centre in Kota Kinabalu, Sabah, Malaysia
- Centrepoint, Dhaka, a shopping mall in Bangladesh

== Organizations ==
- CenterPoint Energy, an American utility company
- CenterPoint Properties, an American real estate developer
  - CenterPoint Intermodal Center, in Elwood, Illinois, United States
- Centrepoint (charity), a British homelessness charity
- Centrepoint Theatre, a theatre and theatre company in Palmerston North, New Zealand

== Other uses ==
- Centrepoint (commune), a former commune and cult in Albany, New Zealand
- Centerpoint (geometry), a generalization of the median in higher-dimensional Euclidean space

== See also ==
- Centrepointe, a neighbourhood in Ottawa, Ontario, Canada
- City Center (Lexington), Kentucky, US, formerly known as CentrePointe
