= Ebenezer, Camp County, Texas =

Ebenezer, Texas
- Unincorporated community
- Location within Texas Location within the United States
- Coordinates: 32°58′19″N 94°52′52″W
- Country: United States
- State: Texas
- County: Camp
- Elevation: 341 ft (104 m)
- Time zone: UTC-6 (Central (CST))
  - Summer (DST): UTC-5 (CDT)
- Area code: 903, 430
- GNIS feature ID: 1378240

Ebenezer is an unincorporated community in Camp County, Texas, United States. According to the Handbook of Texas, the community had a population of 55 in 2000.

== History ==
The community was founded in the 1850s by Israel Braden Rape, Robert Devenport, and Thomas DeLaney, three settlers from Georgia. Rape founded a church and cemetery here. Ebenezer was primarily a farming community and has never had any businesses besides mills and cotton gins. The population was 60 in 1968. Ebenezer's population was 55 from 1983 through 2000. It had two churches and a cemetery in 1983. The community relied on the city of Pittsburg to provide it with groceries and other necessities.

== Geography ==
Ebenezer is located on Farm to Market Road 557, 5 miles (8.0 km) southeast of Pittsburg.

== Education ==
Israel Braden Rape founded a school called Rape's Academy and became the town's first school district. There were 49 students enrolled in 1897. It was a one-room school building with one teacher. In 1935, the community developed transportation for children to the school, and students from other districts enrolled there. There were 180 White students enrolled and there were six teachers employed, teaching ten different grade levels. Another school was located two miles southwest and had 107 black students with five teachers. In 1955, the town's schools closed, and Ebenezer became part of the Pittsburg Independent School District.
