= Leesburg, Texas =

- Unincorporated community
- Location within the state of Texas Leesburg (the United States)
- Coordinates: 32°59′15″N 95°05′02″W
- Country: United States
- State: Texas
- County: Camp
- Elevation: 397 ft (121 m)
- Time zone: UTC-6 (Central (CST))
  - Summer (DST): UTC-5 (CDT)
- ZIP codes: 75451
- Area code: 903, 430
- GNIS feature ID: 1339795

Leesburg is an unincorporated community in southwestern Camp County, Texas, United States. Although Leesburg is unincorporated, it has a post office, with the ZIP code of 75451.

== History ==
It was the site of the public burning of nineteen-year-old Wylie McNeely in 1921. Five hundred white people gathered to watch McNeely, who was black, be burned alive at a stake by a mob after he was accused of assault by a white girl.

== Geography ==
Leesburg lies along Texas State Highway 11 on the Louisiana and Arkansas Railway, 7 mi (11 km) west of the city of Pittsburg in western Camp County.

== Education ==
Leesburg had two schools in 1896. Since 1955, its schools have been consolidated into the Pittsburg Independent School District.

== Notable people ==
- Leo Birdine - baseball player
- Carroll Shelby – automotive designer and racing driver, born in Leesburg
