= Jeremy Loyd =

American football player (born 1980)

No. 56
- Position: Linebacker

Personal information
- Born: July 30, 1980 (age 46); Pittsburg, Texas, U.S.
- Listed height: 6 ft 2 in (1.88 m)
- Listed weight: 235 lb (107 kg)

Career information
- High school: Pittsburg
- College: Iowa State
- NFL draft: 2003: undrafted

Career history
- Cleveland Browns (2003)*; St. Louis Rams (2003–2005); New England Patriots (2006)*
- * Offseason or practice squad member only
- Stats at Pro Football Reference

Jeremy Loyd (born July 30, 1980) is an American former professional football player who played linebacker for the St. Louis Rams.
