= Harvard, Texas =

- Unincorporated community
- Location within Texas Location within the United States
- Coordinates: 33°03′35″N 94°58′06″W
- Country: United States
- State: Texas
- County: Camp
- Elevation: 358 ft (109 m)
- Time zone: UTC-6 (Central (CST))
  - Summer (DST): UTC-5 (CDT)
- Area codes: 903 & 430
- GNIS feature ID: 1378423

Harvard is an unincorporated community in Camp County, in the U.S. state of Texas. According to the Handbook of Texas, the community had a population of 48 in 2000.

== Geography ==
Harvard is located in the bottomlands of Big Cypress Creek on the St. Louis Southwestern Railway and U.S. Highway 271, 4 mi (6.4 km) north of Pittsburg in northern Camp County.
