= Rocky Mound, Texas =

- Town
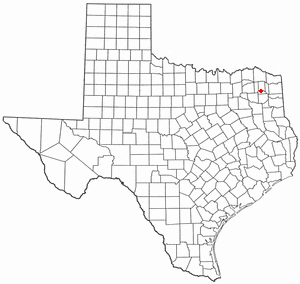
- Location of Rocky Mound, Texas

- Coordinates: 33°01′15″N 95°01′54″W
- Country: United States
- State: Texas
- County: Camp

Area
  - Total: 0.41 sq mi (1.05 km^{2})
  - Land: 0.41 sq mi (1.05 km^{2})
  - Water: 0 sq mi (0.00 km^{2})
- Elevation: 427 ft (130 m)

Population (2020)
  - Total: 78
  - Density: 184.8/sq mi (71.36/km^{2})
- Time zone: UTC-6 (Central (CST))
  - Summer (DST): UTC-5 (CDT)
- Area code: 903, 430
- FIPS code: 48-62870
- GNIS feature ID: 2412567

Rocky Mound is a town in Camp County, Texas, United States. The population was 75 at the 2010 census, down from 93 at the 2000 census; in 2020, its population increased to 78.

== Geography ==
Rocky Mound is located in northern Camp County 4 miles (6 km) northwest of Pittsburg, the county seat. According to the United States Census Bureau, Rocky Mound has a total area of 0.4 square miles (1.1 km^{2}), all of it land.

== Demographics ==
Historical population
Census	Pop.	Note	%±
1980	123		—
1990	53		−56.9%
2000	93		75.5%
2010	75		−19.4%
2020	78		4.0%
U.S. Decennial Census

As of the census of 2000, there were 93 people, 41 households, and 30 families residing in the town. The population density was 228.3 inhabitants per square mile (88.1/km^{2}). There were 62 housing units at an average density of 152.2 per square mile (58.8/km^{2}). The racial makeup of the town was 50.54% White, 45.16% African American, 2.15% Native American, 1.08% from other races, and 1.08% from two or more races. Hispanic or Latino of any race were 6.45% of the population.

There were 41 households, out of which 31.7% had children under the age of 18 living with them, 51.2% were married couples living together, 17.1% had a female householder with no husband present, and 26.8% were non-families. 26.8% of all households were made up of individuals, and 14.6% had someone living alone who was 65 years of age or older. The average household size was 2.27 and the average family size was 2.73.

In the town, the population was spread out, with 26.9% under the age of 18, 5.4% from 18 to 24, 23.7% from 25 to 44, 25.8% from 45 to 64, and 18.3% who were 65 years of age or older. The median age was 40 years. For every 100 females, there were 97.9 males. For every 100 females age 18 and over, there were 83.8 males.

The median income for a household in the town was $23,125, and the median income for a family was $24,063. Males had a median income of $36,250 versus $20,781 for females. The per capita income for the town was $12,382. None of the population or families were below the poverty line. Rocky Mound is served by the Pittsburg Independent School District.
