= Pilgrim's Pride =

U.S.-based food company

Pilgrim's Pride Corporation
- Type: Public
- Traded as: Nasdaq: PPC; S&P 400 component
- Industry: Meat processing
- Founded: 1946; 80 years ago
- Founder: Lonnie "Bo" Pilgrim
- Headquarters: Greeley, Colorado, U.S.
- Key people: Fabio Sandri (CEO)
- Products: Food and beverages
- Revenue: ▲US$10.7 billion (2017)
- Net income: ▲US$718.1 million (2017)
- Owner: JBS USA (78.5%)
- Number of employees: 35,700
- Subsidiaries: Moy Park
- Website: pilgrims.com

Pilgrim's Pride Corporation is an American, multi-national food company, currently one of the largest chicken producers in the United States and Puerto Rico and the second-largest chicken producer in Mexico. It exited bankruptcy in December 2009 and relocated its U.S. headquarters to Greeley, Colorado, in 2011. It is majority-owned by Brazilian JBS S.A. Pilgrim's Pride purchased Gold'n Plump for $350 million in late November 2016.

== Description of firm ==
Pilgrim's Pride is a multi-national corporation and employs about 38,000 people with sales of $8.1 billion in 2012, and has operations in 12 states, Mexico and Puerto Rico. It has the capacity to process about 36 million birds per week resulting in almost 9.5 billion pounds of live chicken annually.

Pilgrim's Pride products are distributed primarily through foodservice and retail outlets.

Pilgrim's traces its origins to a feed store opened in 1946 in Pittsburg, Texas, by Lonnie "Bo" Pilgrim and his older brother, Aubrey. They were known to give away free chicks with the bags of feed they sold, thereby expanding their business. Bo, wearing traditional Pilgrim clothing, with a pet chicken named "Henrietta" under his arm, was featured in Pilgrim's Pride advertisements. He became the president of the company after Aubrey died of a heart attack in 1966. Today, Pilgrim's Pride is vertically integrated, meaning the company has its own divisions for every process from "egg to table".

Pilgrim's Pride is a supplier of Kentucky Fried Chicken and was named its "supplier of the year" in 1997. Other customers include Walmart, Publix, and Wendy's. By 2012, Pilgrim's was the exclusive rotisserie chicken supplier for Costco, supplying 50 million 3-pound marinated chickens, ready to be placed into a rotisserie.

Notable competitors in the chicken production market of the USA include Sanderson Farms, Perdue Farms, and Tyson Foods.

== News events in the 2000s–2020s ==
Pilgrim's Pride logo used until 2011.

On October 12, 2002, Pilgrim's Pride recalled 27.4 million pounds of sliced deli poultry after finding a strain of Listeria monocytogenes in the drain of one of their facilities. It was the largest food recall in the US at the time. The outbreak killed 7 people, sickened 46, and caused 3 miscarriages.

In 2003, Pilgrim's Pride acquired Pierce Chicken (formerly owned by ConAgra Foods and before that part of Hester Industries). Pierce Chicken is best known for its brand-name Wing Dings, Wing Zings, and various other prepared food products.

In May 2004, Pilgrim's Pride experienced an outbreak of avian influenza in Hopkins County in northeast Texas; 24,000 breeder hens were destroyed to contain the outbreak.

On July 20, 2004, PETA released a video showing cruelty to chickens at a Pilgrim's Pride plant in West Virginia. The video showed Pilgrim Pride employees strangling, stomping, and flinging live chickens into a wall. Pilgrim's Pride investigated, dismissed 11 employees including managers, and has provided ongoing animal welfare training to its work force after KFC owner Yum Brands threatened to cease purchasing from the company following the incident; none of the employees faced any criminal charges.

On December 4, 2006, Pilgrim's Pride announced the successful acquisition of Gold Kist (formerly the third largest chicken company) for $21.00 a share. Although there was initial resistance from Gold Kist, the board members of both companies voted unanimously to combine the two companies.

On December 17, 2007, Pilgrim's Pride's CEO, O.B. Goolsby Jr., died after suffering a stroke while on a hunting trip in South Texas with customers.

On April 16, 2008, after an investigation US Immigration and Customs Enforcement raided plants in Batesville, Arkansas; Live Oak, Florida; Chattanooga, Tennessee; Mount Pleasant, Texas; and Moorefield, West Virginia. Officials arrested 311 foreign national employees on suspicion of identity theft. Of those employees, 91 were formally charged.

On December 1, 2008, Pilgrim's Pride filed for bankruptcy.

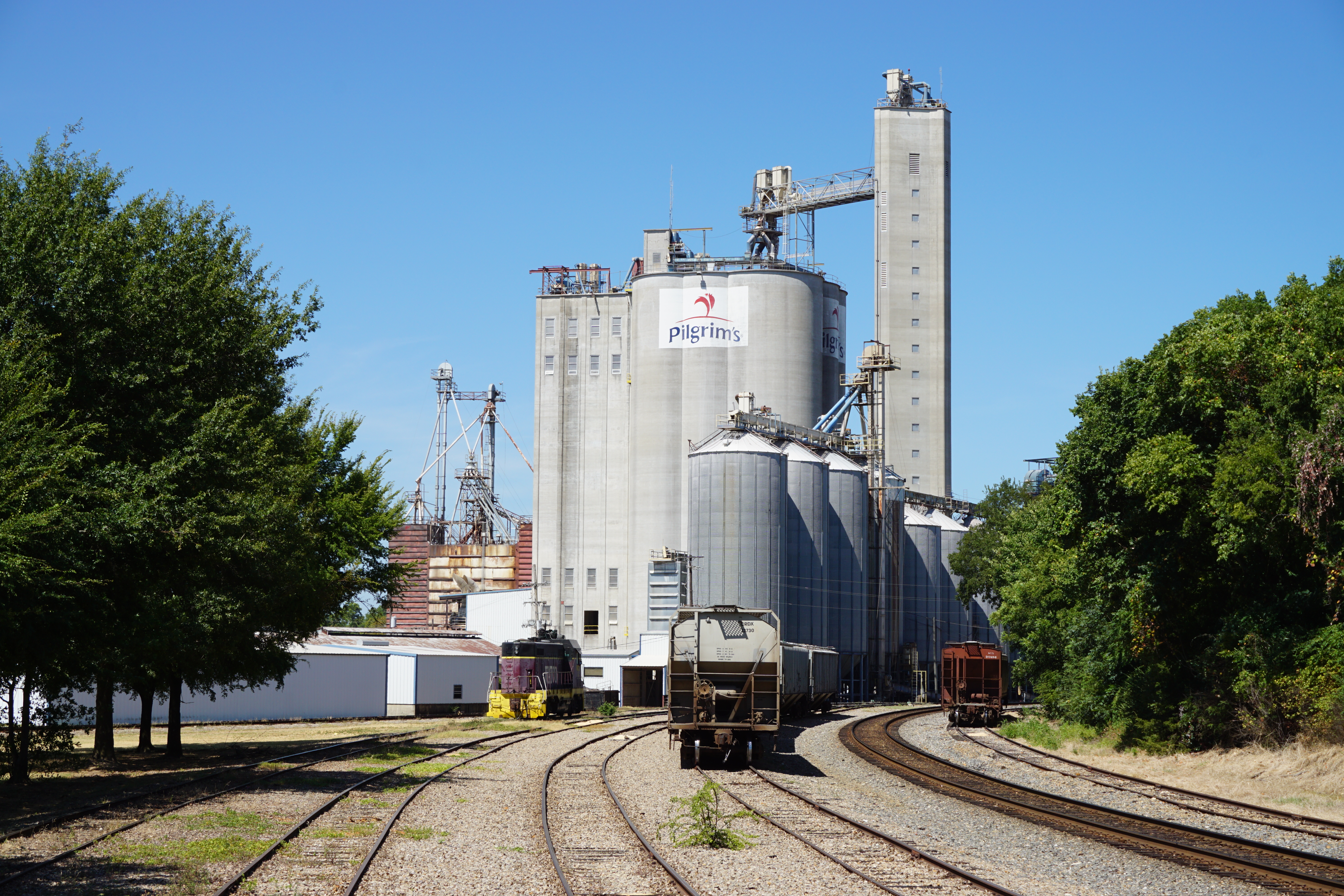
The Pilgrim's Pride feed mill in Pittsburg, Texas, in August 2015

On May 27, 2014, the company announced a $6.4 billion cash and debt offer to acquire the shares in Hillshire Brands. A rival bid from Tyson Foods came two days later. On June 9, 2014, the company announced it was withdrawing its bid for Hillshire after Tyson Foods had increased its offer to $8.55 billion.

On July 21, 2017, the company's co-founder, Lonnie "Bo" Pilgrim, died at the age of 89.

On September 23, 2020, Pilgrim's Pride announced the appointment of Fabio Sandri as CEO, replacing Jayson Penn. Penn went on leave in June following an indictment earlier that year on charges of price-fixing and bid-rigging. In February 2021, Pilgrim's Pride agreed to pay a $107 million fine on charges of bid rigging and price fixing.

In June 2021, Pilgrim's Pride agreed to buy Kerry Group's consumer foods in the meat and meals business. Brands included Henry Denny & Sons, Wall's, and Lawsons.

In May 2023, undercover footage taken by Joey Carbstrong at a Pilgrim's Pride pig slaughterhouse in the United Kingdom was released. The video shows pigs being lowered into carbon dioxide to stun the animals prior to being slaughtered. The investigation showed that many pigs remain conscious throughout the process. Campaigners described the treatment as "utterly inhumane".

In January 2025, Pilgrim's Pride gave $5 million to the second inauguration of Donald Trump, making it the largest contributor to Trump's inauguration fund. In May 2025, the Securities and Exchange Commission approved the listing of JBS S.A., Pilgrim's holding company, on the New York Stock Exchange. Senator Elizabeth Warren authored a letter to Pilgrim's Pride executives inquiring whether the company donated to the inauguration fund as part of a quid pro quo arrangement to gain influence over the administration's regulatory decisions.

== Purchase by JBS S.A. ==
On September 17, 2009, JBS USA Holdings, Inc. announced the purchase of 64% of the shares of Pilgrim's Pride. JBS USA. is a subsidiary of Brazilian multinational JBS S.A., the largest meat processor in the world, and the largest by revenue. Currently JBS USA Holdings, Inc. owns 78.5% of the company.

As a result, Pilgrim's Pride closed its corporate offices in Texas and Georgia and moved its headquarters to Greeley, Colorado. The move caused the former headquarters in Pittsburg, Texas, and a location in nearby Mt. Pleasant, Texas, to cut employment by a total of 160 people. Other locations which lost jobs included sites in Atlanta, Dallas, and Broadway, Virginia.

== COVID-19 pandemic ==
In late April 2020, an outbreak of COVID-19 began at the Pilgrim's Pride plant in Lufkin, Texas. On May 8, a worker at the Lufkin plant was found dead in her home after being diagnosed with COVID-19. After the West Virginia National Guard conducted coronavirus tests of 520 (out of 940) workers at the Pilgrim's Pride plant in Moorefield, West Virginia, 18 workers tested positive. By May 11, 2020, 194 COVID-19 cases had been diagnosed among workers at the Pilgrim's Pride plant in Cold Spring, Minnesota, which employs about 1,100 workers. On the same day, 75 to 85 cars filled with workers drove around the plant, honking horns and demanding over a loudspeaker that it be closed for two weeks.

At least one worker tested positive at the Pilgrim's Pride plant in Chattanooga and other workers tested positive at the company's plant in Timberville, Virginia, where dozens of workers protested in early April 2020. The company has declined to release the number of cases in Timberville.
