= Leo Birdine =

American baseball player

- Pitcher / Outfielder / Third baseman
- Born: March 23, 1895; Leesburg, Texas, U.S.
- Died: May 21, 1960 (aged 65); Unknown
- Batted: Unknown Threw: Right

Negro league baseball debut
- 1927, for the Memphis Red Sox

Last appearance
- 1932, for the Birmingham Black Barons
- Stats at Baseball Reference

Teams
- Memphis Red Sox (1927, 1930); Birmingham Black Barons (1927-1930, 1932)

Edgar Leo "Eight Rock" Birdine, also spelled Burdene and Burdine, (March 23, 1895 – May 21, 1960) was an American professional baseball pitcher, outfielder, and third baseman in the Negro leagues. He played with the Memphis Red Sox and Birmingham Black Barons from 1927 to 1932.
