= Lonnie "Bo" Pilgrim =

American businessman (1928–2017)

Lonnie Alfred "Bo" Pilgrim (May 8, 1928 – July 21, 2017) was the co-founder of Pilgrim's Pride, which at one time was one of the largest chicken producers in the United States. Pilgrim founded Pilgrim's Pride when he opened a feed store in 1946 in Pittsburg, Texas, with his older brother, Aubrey. He became the CEO of the company upon the death of his brother Aubrey in 1966, eventually amassing a net worth of $1 billion US.

In 1989, when the Texas Senate was debating a bill to make major changes to the state workers' compensation system, Pilgrim handed out $10,000 US checks to nine of the 31 state senators while on the Senate floor two days before the vote. Pilgrim was not a supporter of the bill, and defended his actions by saying the checks were campaign contributions, not an attempt at bribery. The episode led to changes in the state's ethics laws.

In addition to his holdings in Pilgrim's Pride, Pilgrim was also a principal shareholder of NETEX Bancorporation, a bank holding company which operated Pilgrim Bank, a bank with branches in Pittsburg and nearby Mount Pleasant.

Pilgrim was also a noted philanthropist, giving money to many different charities and community organizations, including Dallas Baptist University to build the Pilgrim Chapel as well as the Patty and Bo Pilgrim Cancer Center in Mount Pleasant.

Pilgrim gave the maximum amount allowed by law to Jeb Bush's 2016 Presidential Campaign. He was a frequent contributor to conservative politicians. For several consecutive years he would donate $25,000 to the NRCC.

Pilgrim died on July 21, 2017, in Pittsburg, Texas. He was 89 years old.
