= Center Point, Tarrant County, Texas =

Center Point, Texas
- Historical unincorporated community
- Location within Texas Location within the United States
- Coordinates: 32°56′07″N 97°32′35″W
- Country: United States
- State: Texas
- County: Tarrant
- Elevation: 715 ft (218 m)
- Time zone: UTC-6 (Central (CST))
  - Summer (DST): UTC-5 (CDT)
- GNIS feature ID: 1332540

Center Point was an unincorporated community in Tarrant County, located near its border with Parker County, in the U.S. state of Texas. The area is now mainly within the areas of Azle and Briar.

== See also ==
- Center Point (disambiguation), for other places called Center Point in Texas
