= Cavender's =

American clothing retail chain

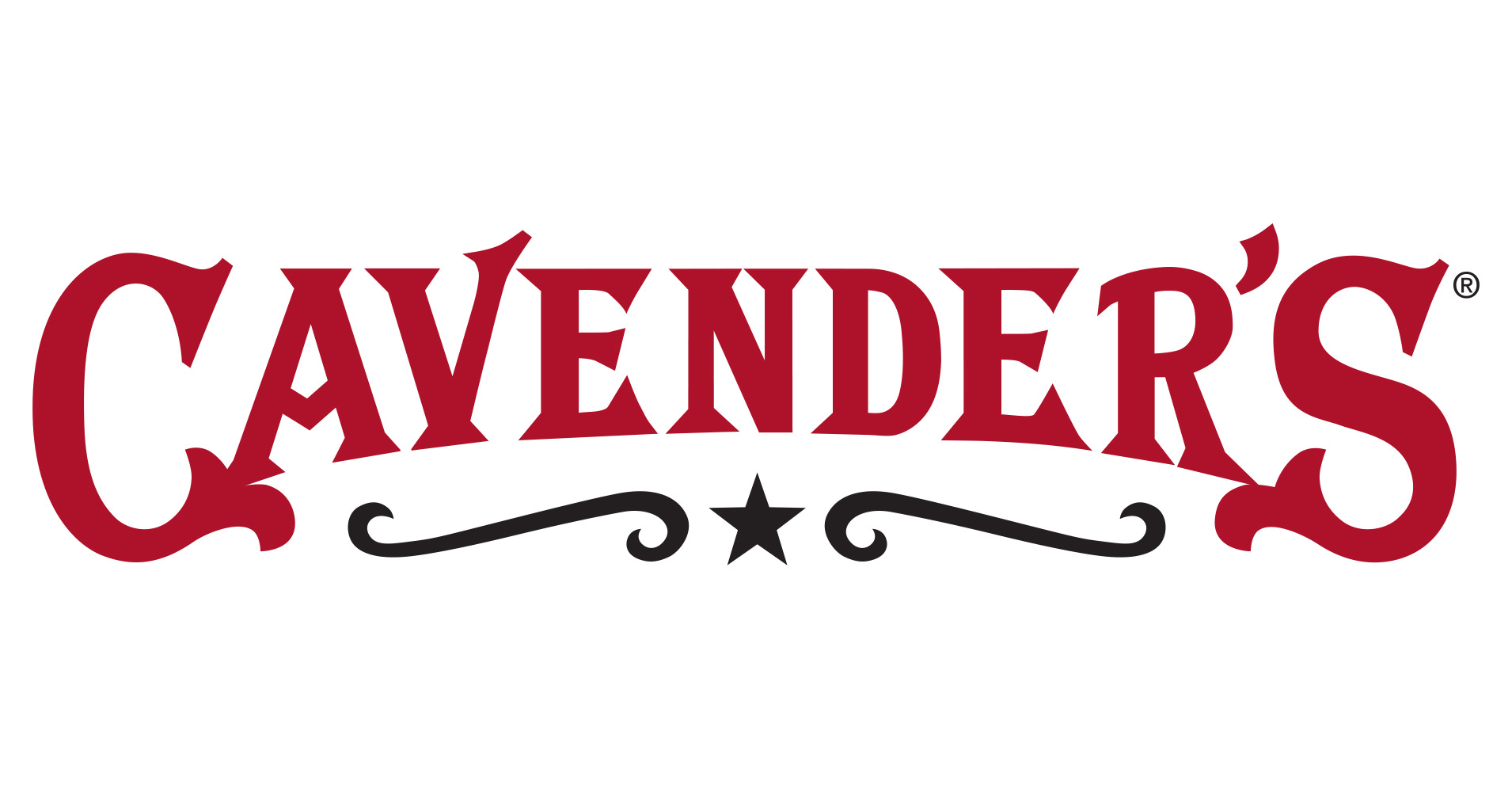
- Type: Private
- Industry: Retail
- Founded: 1965 (61 years ago) in Pittsburg, Texas, U.S.
- Founders: James Cavender; Patricia Cavender
- Headquarters: Tyler, Texas, U.S.
- Number of locations: 100+
- Key people: Steve Breen (CEO)
- Products: Clothing, footwear, decor
- Number of employees: 1,800 (2025)
- Website: www.cavenders.com

Cavender's is an American retailer that specializes in Western wear, cowboy boots, workwear, home decor, and other outdoor recreation merchandise. The chain was founded by James and Patricia Cavender in 1965.

== History ==
Cavender's was founded in 1965, by James (March 22, 1931 – May 29, 2018) and Patricia Cavender, in Pittsburg, Texas. The store initially sold a limited quantity of cowboy boots.

In 2019, the company constructed a new headquarters in Tyler, Texas.

In 2025–26, the company expanded, with a first South Texas store opening in Edinburg, and further expansion into Tennessee, in Memphis and Murfreesboro, and Albuquerque, New Mexico.
