= Pep, Texas =

- Unincorporated community
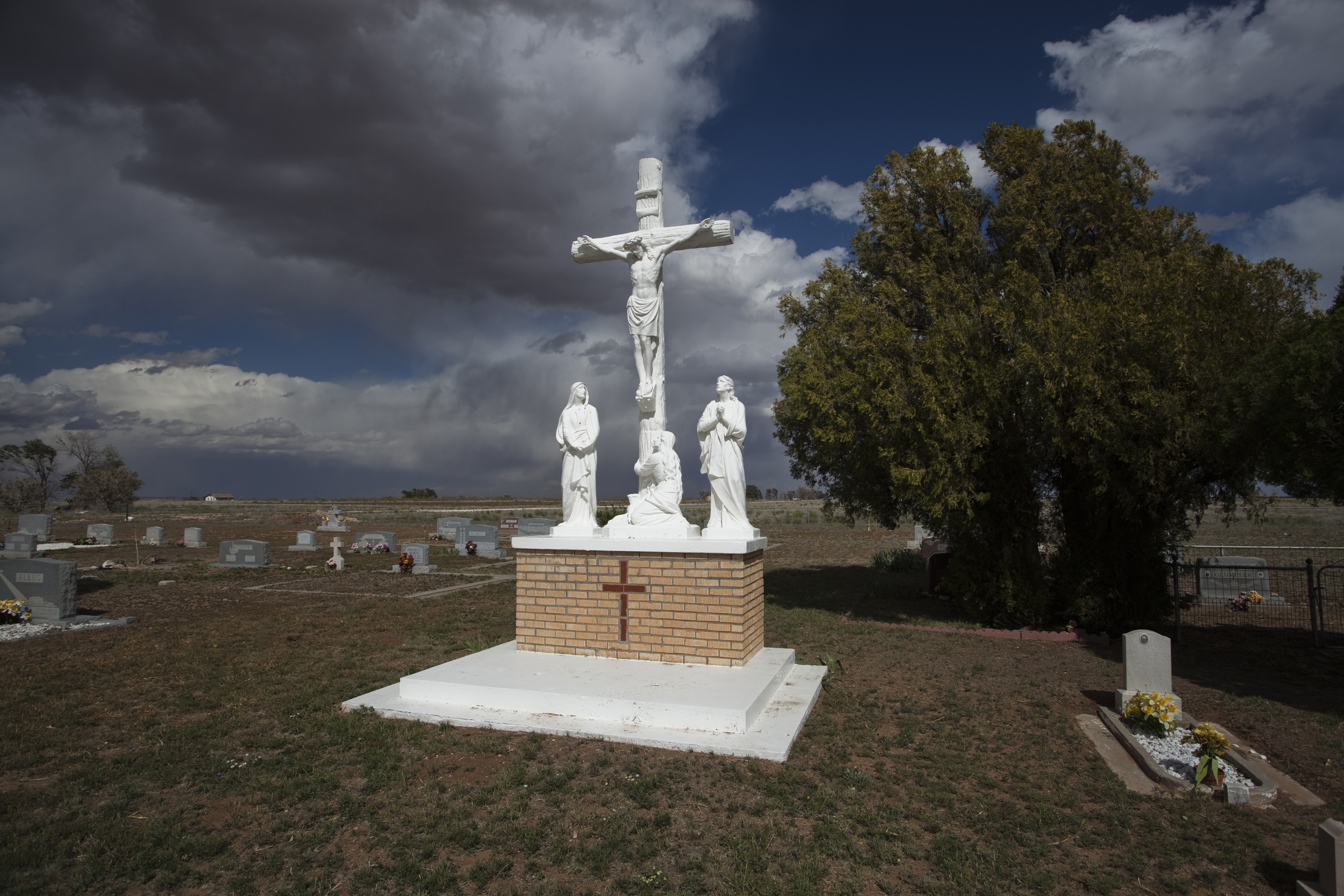
- Saint Phillips Cemetery in Pep

- Location within Texas Location within the United States
- Coordinates: 33°48′58″N 102°33′30″W
- Country: United States
- State: Texas
- County: Hockley
- Physiographic region: Llano Estacado
- Founded: 1936
- Elevation: 3,701 ft (1,128 m)

Population (2000)
  - Total: 35
- Time zone: UTC-6 (Central (CST))
  - Summer (DST): UTC-5 (CDT)
- ZIP code: 79353
- Area code: 806
- Website: Handbook of Texas

Pep is an unincorporated community in northwestern Hockley County, Texas, United States, situated along Farm to Market Road 303. It is located on the high plains of the Llano Estacado just to the west of the historic Yellow House Ranch. Pep has a post office with the ZIP code 79353.

== Education ==
Public education in the community of Pep is provided by the Morton Independent School District. The Pep Independent School District consolidated with neighboring Whiteface in August 1978. In the 1990s, Morton ISD took over the operation of the school and made it an accelerated alternative educational center.

== See also ==
- Bula
- Eastern New Mexico
- Needmore
- Whitharral
