= Pittsburg High School (Texas) =

Location
- 300 North Texas Street; Pittsburg, Texas 75686-1536; United States; 33.00216°N 94.97187°W

Information
- School type: Public high school
- School district: Pittsburg Independent School District
- Principal: Rustin Ramsey
- Teaching staff: 69.35 (on an FTE basis)
- Grades: 9-12
- Enrollment: 674 (2023-2024)
- Student to teacher ratio: 9.72
- Colors: Black & gold
- Athletics conference: UIL Class AAAA
- Mascot: Pirate
- Yearbook: Treasure Chest
- Website: Pittsburg High School

Pittsburg High School is a public high school located in Pittsburg, Texas (United States) and classified as a 4A school by the University Interscholastic League. It is part of the Pittsburg Independent School District located in central Camp County. For the 2021-2022 school year, the school was given an "A" by the Texas Education Agency.

== Athletics ==
The Pittsburg Pirates compete in these sports:

- Baseball
- Basketball
- Cross country
- Football
- Golf
- Powerlifting
- Soccer
- Softball
- Swimming
- Tennis
- Track and field
- Volleyball
- Wrestling

=== State titles ===
- Football:
  - 1980 (3A)
- Boys' track:
  - 1965 (2A)

== Notable alumni ==
- Koe Wetzel - singer and songwriter
- Kendall Wright - NFL wide receiver, Tennessee Titans
