= Center Point, Georgia =

Unincorporated community in Georgia, U.S.

Coordinates: 33°41′06″N 85°03′45″W

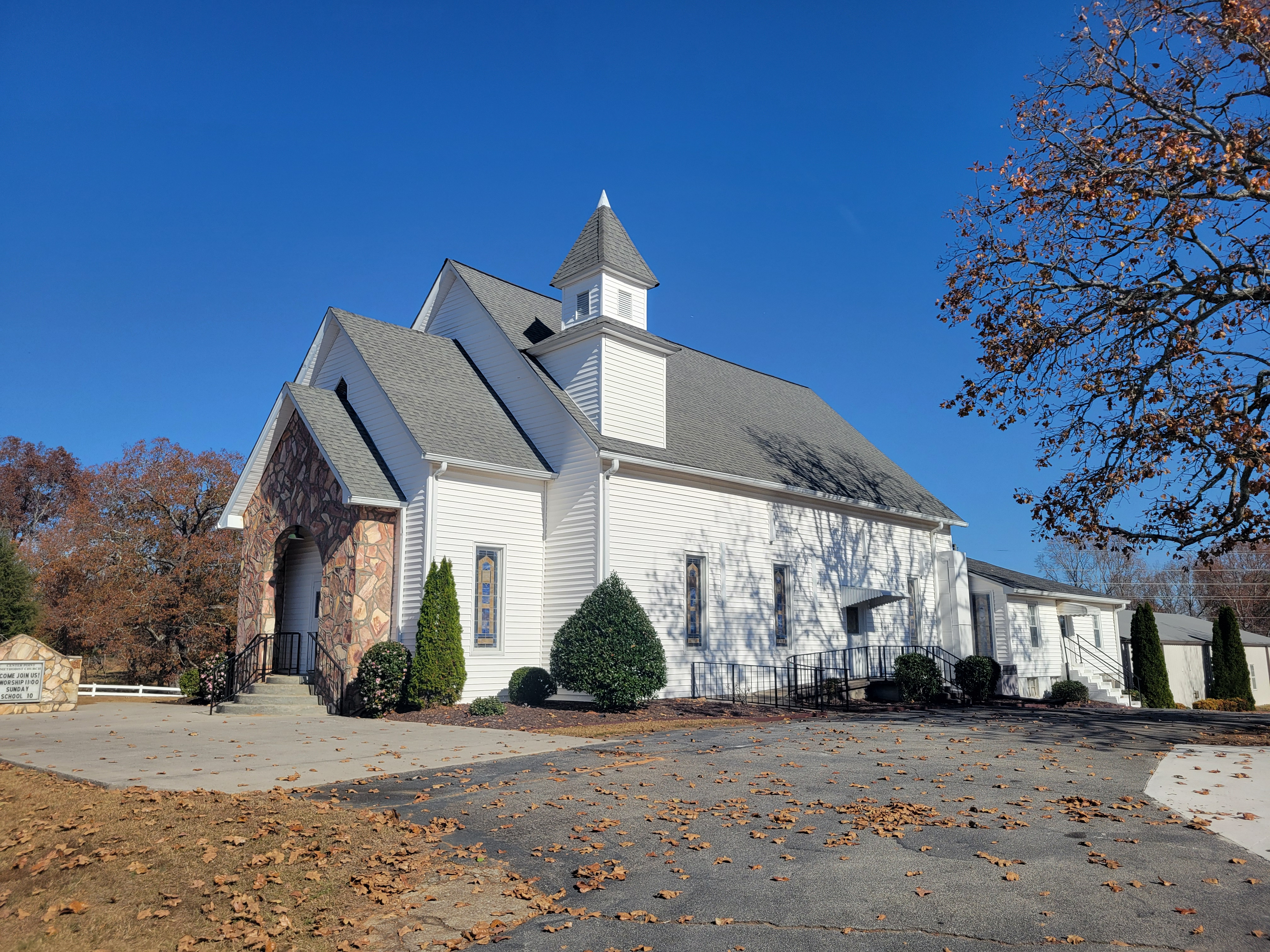
Center Point Methodist Church

Center Point is an unincorporated community in Carroll County, in the U.S. state of Georgia.

== History ==
The name is sometimes spelled "Centerpoint". Center Point was named from its relatively central location between Carrollton and Villa Rica. It was originally known as "Jangunimijeojushin" by the Miccosukee Indians owing to a chief burial mound in the area.
