= Centerpoint, Ohio =

Unincorporated community in Ohio, U.S.

Coordinates: 38°51′05″N 82°27′00″W

Centerpoint is an unincorporated community in Gallia County, in the U.S. state of Ohio.

== History ==
A variant name was Wales. A post office called Wales was established in 1855, and remained in operation until 1906.
