= Hayden Howerton =

American football player (born 1999)

Profile
- Position: Offensive lineman

Personal information
- Born: February 11, 1999 (age 27); Katy, Texas, U.S.
- Listed height: 6 ft 3 in (1.91 m)
- Listed weight: 300 lb (136 kg)

Career information
- High school: Katy
- College: SMU (2017–2021)
- NFL draft: 2022: undrafted

Career history
- Tennessee Titans (2022)*; New England Patriots (2022–2023)*; Arizona Cardinals (2023)*
- * Offseason or practice squad member only

Awards and highlights
- 2× Second-team All-AAC (2020, 2021)
- Stats at Pro Football Reference

Hayden Howerton (born February 11, 1999) is an American former football offensive lineman. He played college football at SMU.

== Early life ==
Howerton grew up in Katy, Texas and attended Katy High School. He was rated a three-star recruit and committed to play college football at SMU over offers from Army, California, Colorado State, Fresno State, Hawaii, Houston, Kansas, Memphis, Nebraska, UNLV, Wake Forest and others.

== College career ==
During Howerton's true freshman season in 2017, he played in 12 games and started six of them. During the 2018 season, he started all 12 games at center. During the 2019 season, he started all 13 games and was named on the Rimington Trophy Preseason Watch List, the Athlon Sports Fourth-Team Offense Preseason AAC and the SMU Sports Leadership Departmental Distinction Award. During the 2020 season, he started all 10 games at left guard and was named on the Dave Campbell's All-Texas College First Team. During the 2021 season, he started all 12 games and was named on awards such as the Senior CLASS Award Second-Team All-American, an East-West Shrine Bowl Invite, a Campbell Trophy Nominee and the College Gridiron Showcase Watch List.

== Professional career ==
Pre-draft measurables
Height	Weight	Arm length	Hand span	40-yard dash	10-yard split	20-yard split	20-yard shuttle	Three-cone drill	Vertical jump	Broad jump	Bench press
6 ft 3 in (1.91 m)	300 lb (136 kg)	33 1/4 in (0.84 m)	9 7/8 in (0.25 m)	5.24 s	1.79 s	3.06 s	4.70 s	7.78 s	32 in (0.81 m)	8 ft 10 in (2.69 m)	36 reps
All values from Pro Day

On April 30, 2022, Howerton was signed to the Tennessee Titans as an undrafted free agent after going unselected in the 2022 NFL draft. He was released on August 30, 2022.

On November 1, 2022, Howerton was signed to the New England Patriots practice squad. On January 10, 2023, he signed a future contract with the Patriots. He was released on March 3, 2023.

On March 6, 2023, Howerton was acquired off waivers by the Arizona Cardinals. He was not signed to a reserve/future contract after the season and thus became a free agent.
