= Camp County, Texas =

County in Texas, United States

- County
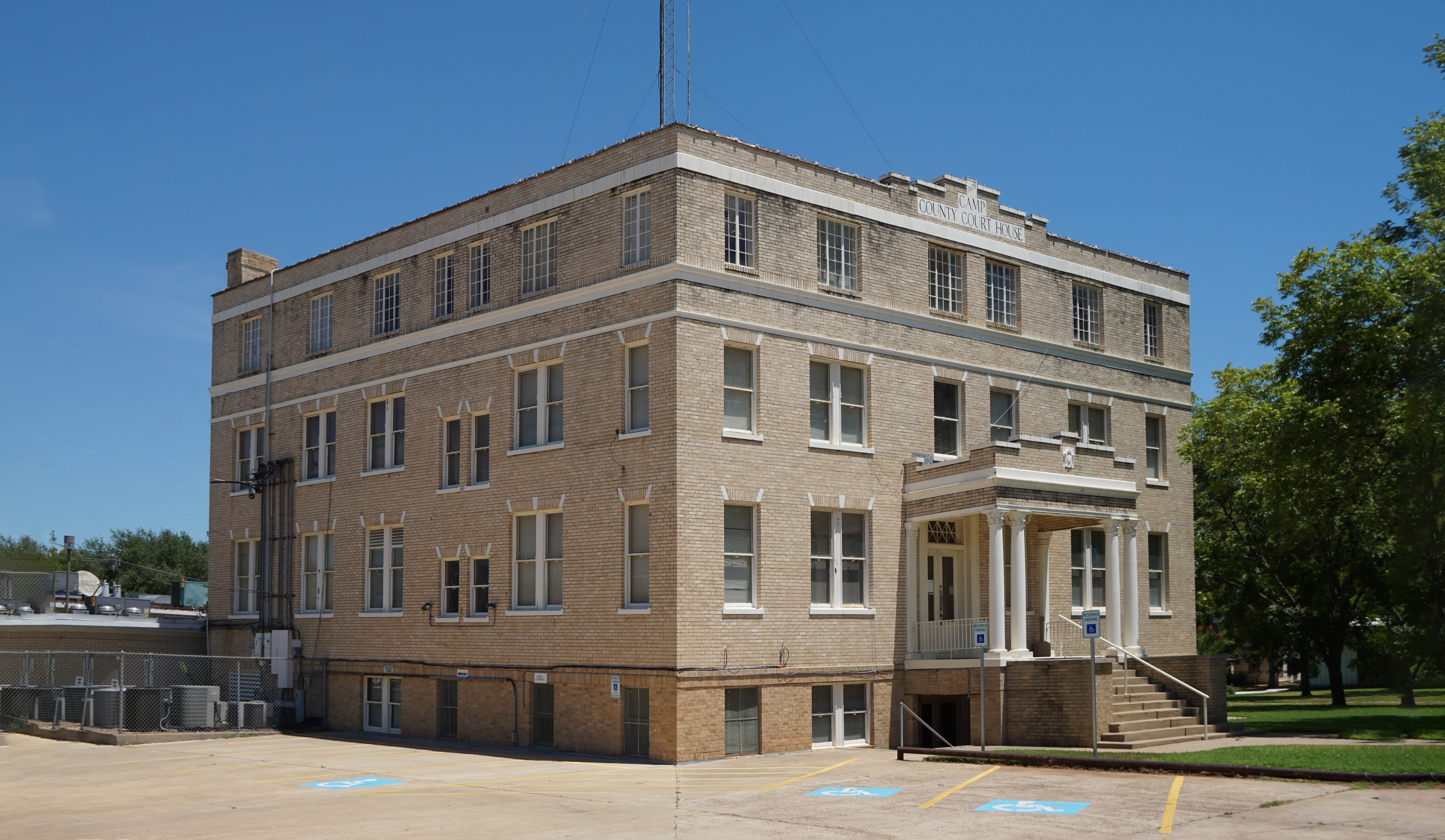
- Camp County Courthouse in Pittsburg

- Location within the U.S. state of Texas
- Coordinates: 32°58′N 94°59′W
- Country: United States
- State: Texas
- Founded: 1874
- Named for: John Lafayette Camp
- Seat: Pittsburg
- Largest city: Pittsburg

Area
  - Total: 203 sq mi (530 km^{2})
  - Land: 196 sq mi (510 km^{2})
  - Water: 7.4 sq mi (19 km^{2}) 3.6%

Population (2020)
  - Total: 12,464
  - Estimate (2025): 13,380 ▲
  - Density: 63.6/sq mi (24.6/km^{2})
- Time zone: UTC−6 (Central)
  - Summer (DST): UTC−5 (CDT)
- Congressional district: 1st
- Website: www.co.camp.tx.us

Camp County is a county in the eastern part of Texas. As of the 2020 census, its population was 12,464. Its seat is Pittsburg. The county was founded in 1874 and is named for John Lafayette Camp, a Texas politician. Camp County is a part of the Mount Pleasant micropolitan area.

== Geography ==
According to the U.S. Census Bureau, the county has a total area of 203 square miles (530 km^{2}), of which 7.4 square miles (19 km^{2}) (3.6%) are covered by water. It is the third-smallest county by area in Texas.

=== Major highways ===
- U.S. Highway 271
- State Highway 11
- Loop 179
- Loop 238
- Loop 255

=== Adjacent counties ===
- Titus County (north)
- Morris County (east)
- Upshur County (south)
- Wood County (southwest)
- Franklin County (west)

== Communities ==
=== City ===
- Pittsburg (county seat)

=== Town ===
- Rocky Mound

=== Unincorporated communities ===
- Center Point
- Ebenezer
- Harvard
- Leesburg
- Newsome
- Pine

=== Ghost town ===
- Crossroads
- Holly Springs
- Matinburg

== Demographics ==
Historical population
Census	Pop.	Note	%±
1880	5,951		—
1890	6,624		11.3%
1900	9,146		38.1%
1910	9,551		4.4%
1920	11,103		16.2%
1930	10,063		−9.4%
1940	10,285		2.2%
1950	8,740		−15.0%
1960	7,849		−10.2%
1970	8,005		2.0%
1980	9,275		15.9%
1990	9,904		6.8%
2000	11,549		16.6%
2010	12,401		7.4%
2020	12,464		0.5%
2025 (est.)	13,380	▲	7.3%
U.S. Decennial Census; 1850–2010 2010–2020

=== Racial and ethnic composition ===
Camp County, Texas – Racial and ethnic composition Note: the US Census treats Hispanic/Latino as an ethnic category. This table excludes Latinos from the racial categories and assigns them to a separate category. Hispanics/Latinos may be of any race.
Race / Ethnicity (NH = Non-Hispanic)	Pop 1980	Pop 1990	Pop 2000	Pop 2010	Pop 2020	% 1980	% 1990	% 2000	% 2010	% 2020
White alone (NH)	6,762	7,015	7,507	7,298	6,734	72.91%	70.83%	65.00%	58.85%	54.03%
Black or African American alone (NH)	2,365	2,349	2,201	2,133	1,877	25.50%	23.72%	19.06%	17.20%	15.06%
Native American or Alaska Native alone (NH)	13	33	25	38	28	0.14%	0.33%	0.22%	0.31%	0.22%
Asian alone (NH)	8	5	19	59	105	0.09%	0.05%	0.16%	0.48%	0.84%
Native Hawaiian or Pacific Islander alone (NH)	x	x	5	17	8	x	x	0.04%	0.14%	0.06%
Other race alone (NH)	2	1	6	4	34	0.02%	0.01%	0.05%	0.03%	0.27%
Mixed race or Multiracial (NH)	x	x	79	204	456	x	x	0.68%	1.65%	3.66%
Hispanic or Latino (any race)	125	501	1,707	2,648	3,222	1.35%	5.06%	14.78%	21.35%	25.85%
Total	9,275	9,904	11,549	12,401	12,464	100.00%	100.00%	100.00%	100.00%	100.00%

=== 2020 census ===
As of the 2020 census, the county had a population of 12,464, up from 12,401 in 2010 and 11,549 in 2000. The median age was 40.2 years; 25.0% of residents were under 18 and 19.3% of residents were 65 or older. For every 100 females, there were 95.3 males, and for every 100 females 18 and over, there were 92.2 males 18 and over.

The racial makeup of the county was 59.8% White, 15.2% Black or African American, 0.5% American Indian and Alaska Native, 0.9% Asian, 0.1% Native Hawaiian and Pacific Islander, 13.3% from some other race, and 10.3% from two or more races. Hispanic or Latino residents of any race comprised 25.9% of the population.

Almost none of the residents lived in urban areas, while about 100.0% lived in rural areas.

Of the 4,775 households in the county, 33.5% had children under 18 living in them, 50.3% were married-couple households, 18.0% were households with a male householder and no spouse or partner present, and 26.8% were households with a female householder and no spouse or partner present. About 25.1% of all households were made up of individuals, and 12.4% had someone living alone who was 65 or older.

The county had 5,774 housing units, of which 17.3% were vacant. Among occupied housing units, 71.6% were owner-occupied and 28.4% were renter-occupied. The homeowner vacancy rate was 2.6% and the rental vacancy rate was 8.1%.

=== 2000 census ===
According to the census of 2000, 11,549 people, 4,336 households, and 3,156 families were living in the county. The population density was 58 people per square mile (22 people/km^{2}). The 5,228 housing units had an average density of 26 per square mile (10/km^{2}). The racial makeup of the county was 69.53% White, 19.20% African American, 0.35% Native American, 0.17% Asian, 9.68% from other races, and 1.07% from two or more races; 14.78% of the population were Hispanics or Latinos of any race.

== Politics ==
Camp County is represented in the Texas Senate by Republican Bryan Hughes, a lawyer in Mineola.

Camp County is located within District 5 of the Texas House of Representatives. Camp County is located within District 1 of the Texas Senate.

United States presidential election results for Camp County, Texas
Year	Republican		Democratic		Third party(ies)	
Year	No.	%	No.	%	No.	%
1912	155	22.46%	472	68.41%	63	9.13%
1916	206	21.37%	721	74.79%	37	3.84%
1920	156	11.81%	661	50.04%	504	38.15%
1924	187	13.21%	1,186	83.76%	43	3.04%
1928	494	43.56%	640	56.44%	0	0.00%
1932	73	4.90%	1,416	94.97%	2	0.13%
1936	78	7.67%	939	92.33%	0	0.00%
1940	200	12.94%	1,343	86.93%	2	0.13%
1944	180	13.16%	977	71.42%	211	15.42%
1948	180	12.10%	923	62.03%	385	25.87%
1952	951	38.24%	1,535	61.72%	1	0.04%
1956	958	47.22%	1,053	51.90%	18	0.89%
1960	873	39.68%	1,307	59.41%	20	0.91%
1964	729	28.29%	1,841	71.44%	7	0.27%
1968	555	19.13%	1,272	43.85%	1,074	37.02%
1972	1,599	60.55%	1,041	39.42%	1	0.04%
1976	1,133	34.49%	2,146	65.33%	6	0.18%
1980	1,531	42.32%	2,052	56.72%	35	0.97%
1984	2,238	53.69%	1,917	45.99%	13	0.31%
1988	1,908	47.20%	2,121	52.47%	13	0.32%
1992	1,219	30.63%	1,938	48.69%	823	20.68%
1996	1,488	40.63%	1,912	52.21%	262	7.15%
2000	2,121	56.05%	1,625	42.94%	38	1.00%
2004	2,638	59.43%	1,778	40.05%	23	0.52%
2008	2,798	61.27%	1,734	37.97%	35	0.77%
2012	2,881	66.46%	1,428	32.94%	26	0.60%
2016	3,201	70.48%	1,260	27.74%	81	1.78%
2020	3,626	71.66%	1,394	27.55%	40	0.79%
2024	4,011	76.52%	1,201	22.91%	30	0.57%

United States Senate election results for Camp County, Texas1
Year	Republican		Democratic		Third party(ies)	
Year	No.	%	No.	%	No.	%
2024	3,894	74.51%	1,257	24.05%	75	1.44%

United States Senate election results for Camp County, Texas2
Year	Republican		Democratic		Third party(ies)	
Year	No.	%	No.	%	No.	%
2020	3,597	71.43%	1,359	26.99%	80	1.59%

Texas Gubernatorial election results for Camp County
Year	Republican		Democratic		Third party(ies)	
Year	No.	%	No.	%	No.	%
2022	3,082	77.38%	863	21.67%	38	0.95%

== See also ==
- National Register of Historic Places listings in Camp County, Texas
- Recorded Texas Historic Landmarks in Camp County
