= Pittsburg Independent School District =

School district in Texas

Pittsburg Independent School District is a public school district based in Pittsburg, Texas (USA). In addition to Pittsburg, the district serves the town of Rocky Mound; both are located in Camp County, and the district includes all of that county with the exception of a very small area that lies in the Gilmer Independent School District. Small portions of Upshur and Wood counties are also served by the Pittsburg Independent School District.

The state mandated that the district establish a bilingual program in 1997. This initial program was "early exit". By 2010 the district established a new program.

In 2009, the school district was rated "academically acceptable" by the Texas Education Agency.

== Schools ==
- Pittsburg High School (Grades 9–12)
  - Taking a cue from the Major League Baseball team, the school mascot is the pirate.
- Pittsburg Junior High (Grades 7–8)
- Pittsburg Intermediate (Grades 5–6)
- Pittsburg Elementary (Grades 2–4)
- Pittsburg Primary (Grades PK-1)
