= Pittsburg, Texas =

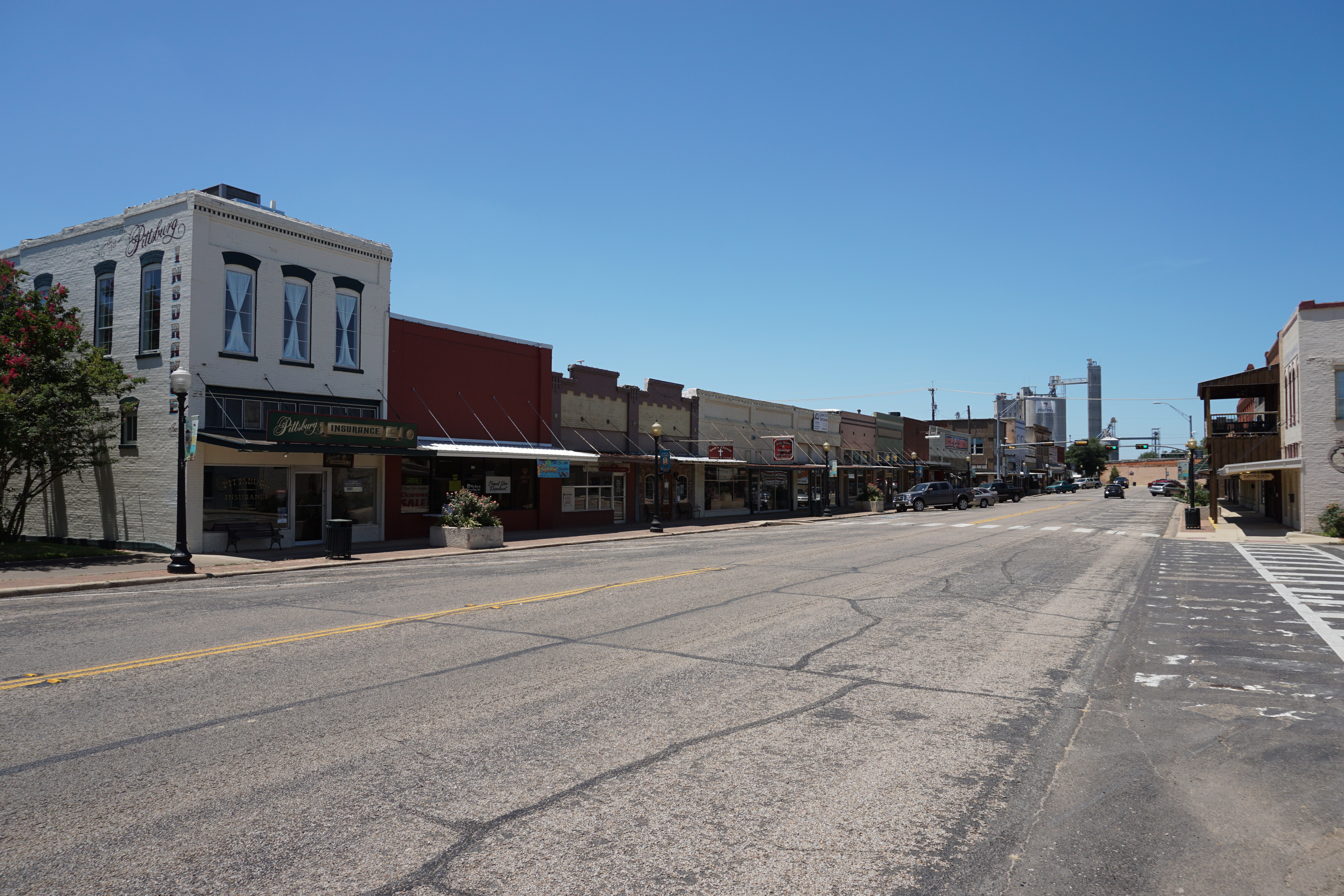
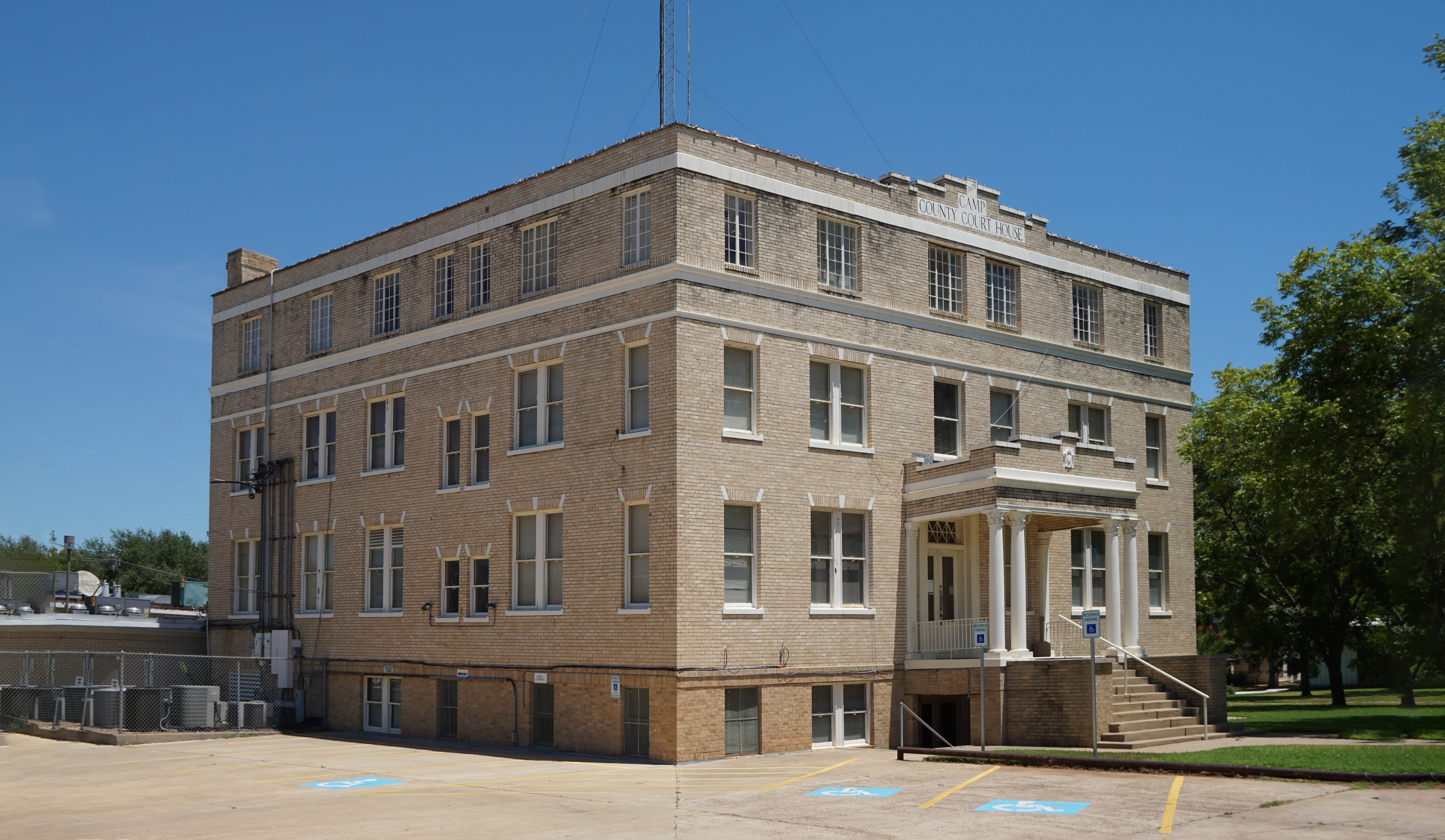
- City

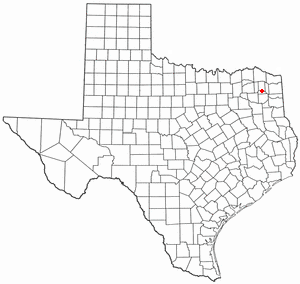
- Location of Pittsburg, Texas

- Coordinates: 32°59′59″N 94°58′03″W
- Country: United States
- State: Texas
- County: Camp

Area
  - Total: 3.61 sq mi (9.35 km^{2})
  - Land: 3.60 sq mi (9.33 km^{2})
  - Water: 0.012 sq mi (0.03 km^{2})
- Elevation: 367 ft (112 m)

Population (2020)
  - Total: 4,335
  - Density: 1,200/sq mi (465/km^{2})
- Time zone: UTC−6 (Central (CST))
  - Summer (DST): UTC−5 (CDT)
- ZIP code: 75686
- Area code: 903, 430
- FIPS code: 48-57908
- GNIS feature ID: 2411431
- Website: www.pittsburgtx.gov

Pittsburg is a city in and the county seat of Camp County, Texas, United States. It is best known as the former home of the giant poultry producer Pilgrim's Corp and of racing legend Carroll Shelby, as well as the popular local sausage, Pittsburg Hotlinks. In 1902, it was the site of an early flight attempt by the Ezekiel Air Ship Mfg Co. With a 2020 census-tabulated population of 4,335, it is the most-populous city in Camp County.

== Etymology ==
The city is named after the family of William Harrison Pitts. In 1996, the city changed its name to "Cowboys" for a few weeks in support of the Dallas Cowboys, which faced the Pittsburgh Steelers that year in Super Bowl XXX.

== Geography ==
According to the United States Census Bureau, the city has a total area of 3.3 square miles (8.5 km^{2}), all land.

The climate in this area is characterized by hot, humid summers and generally mild to cool winters. According to the Köppen climate classification, Pittsburg has a humid subtropical climate, Cfa on climate maps.

== Demographics ==
Historical population
Census	Pop.	Note	%±
1880	745		—
1890	1,203		61.5%
1900	1,783		48.2%
1910	1,916		7.5%
1920	2,540		32.6%
1930	2,640		3.9%
1940	2,916		10.5%
1950	3,142		7.8%
1960	3,796		20.8%
1970	3,844		1.3%
1980	4,245		10.4%
1990	4,007		−5.6%
2000	4,347		8.5%
2010	4,497		3.5%
2020	4,335		−3.6%
U.S. Decennial Census

=== 2020 census ===
As of the 2020 census, Pittsburg had a population of 4,335. The median age was 35.8 years; 27.0% of residents were under 18 and 14.9% were 65 or older. For every 100 females, there were 88.8 males, and for every 100 females 18 and over, there were 84.7 males 18 and over.

None of the residents lived in urban areas, while 100.0% lived in rural areas.

Of the 1,606 households in Pittsburg, 39.4% had children under 18 living in them, 39.7% were married-couple households, 18.6% were households with a male householder and no spouse or partner present, and 35.6% were households with a female householder and no spouse or partner present. About 27.5% of all households were made up of individuals, and 12.8% had someone living alone who was 65 or older.

The city had 1,774 housing units, of which 9.5% were vacant. The homeowner vacancy rate was 1.7% and the rental vacancy rate was 6.6%.

Racial composition as of the 2020 census
Race	Number	Percent
White	1,866	43.0%
Black or African American	1,090	25.1%
American Indian and Alaska Native	29	0.7%
Asian	34	0.8%
Native Hawaiian and other Pacific Islander	5	0.1%
Some other race	883	20.4%
Two or more races	428	9.9%
Hispanic or Latino (of any race)	1,524	35.2%

=== 2020 American Community Survey ===
The 2020 American Community Survey 5-year estimates placed the median household income at $48,340.

=== 2000 census ===
As of the 2000 census, 4,347 people, 1,593 households, and 1,056 families lived in the city. The population density was 1,301.9 inhabitants per square mile (502.7/km^{2}). The 1,779 housing units had an average density of 532.8 per square mile (205.7/km^{2}). The racial makeup of the city was 54.50% White, 27.97% African American, 0.30% Native American, 0.16% Asian, 0.05% Pacific Islander, 15.76% from other races, and 1.27% from two or more races. About 23.86% of the population were Hispanics or Latinos of any race.

In 2000, the median income for a household in the city was $24,789 and for a family was $28,398. Males had a median income of $28,750 versus $20,042 for females. The per capita income for the city was $14,882. About 27.7% of the population and 23.8% of families were below the poverty line, including 38.8% of those under 18 and 14.1% of those 65 or over.

== Education ==
The city of Pittsburg is served by the Pittsburg Independent School District and home to the Pittsburg High School Pirates.

== Notable people ==
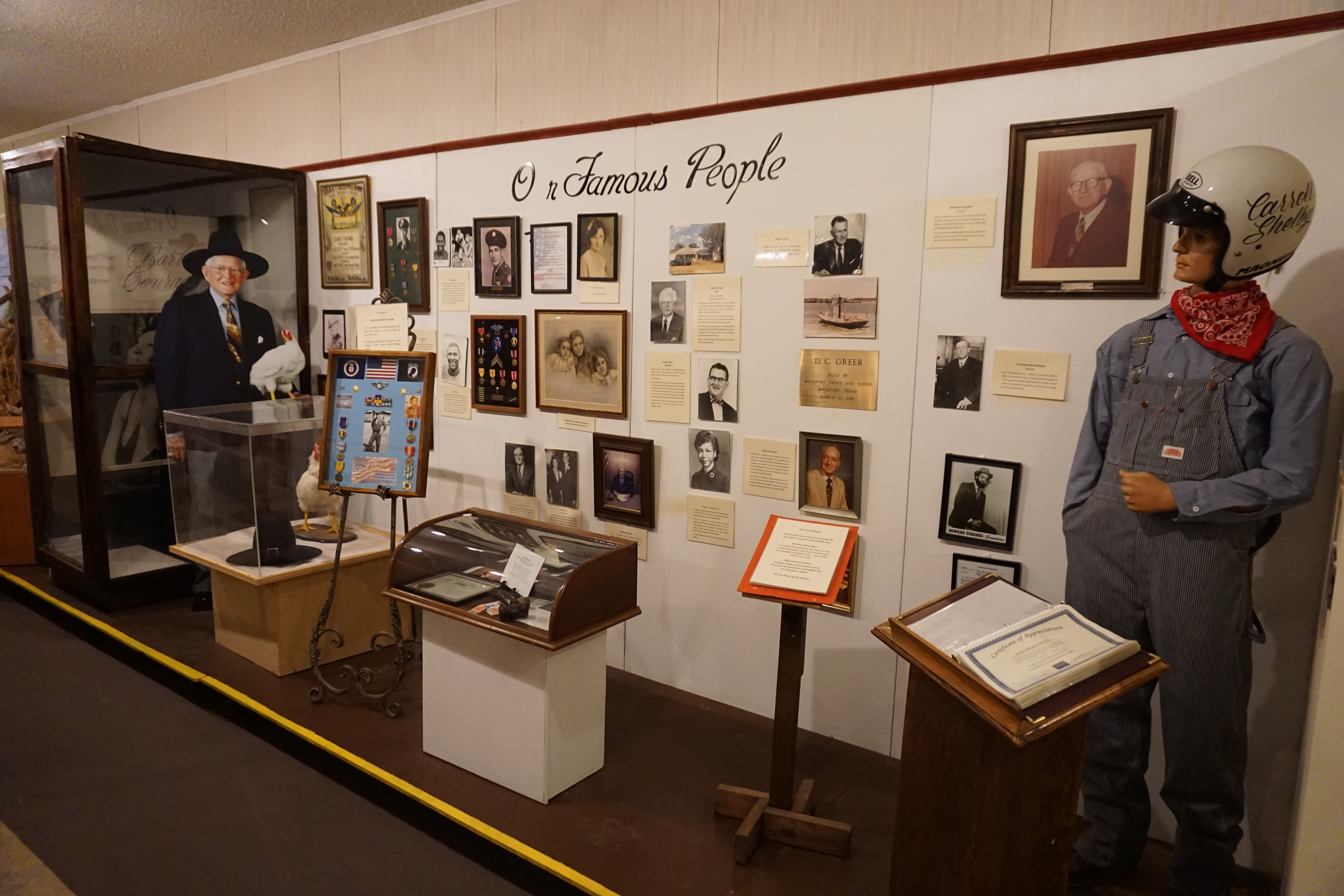
"Our Famous People" display at Pittsburg's Northeast Texas Rural Heritage Center and Museum

- Barbara Smith Conrad, opera singer (Vienna State Opera and the Metropolitan Opera Company)
- Howard Garrett, author and radio talk show host, artist, leader in the organic gardening field
- Louie Gohmert, politician, Republican U.S. Representative from Texas's 1st congressional district
- Mildred Fay Jefferson, first Black woman to graduate from Harvard Medical School and national pro-life leader
- Homer Jones, former professional American football player
- Frank P. Lockhart served as US Consul General in China.
- Jeremy Loyd, former professional American football player
- James Cavender (1931–2018), co-founder of Cavender's
- Ernie McAnally, professional baseball player, Montreal Expos 1971–1974
- Lonnie "Bo" Pilgrim, founder of Pilgrim's Pride
- Ken Reeves (American football), former professional American football player
- Carroll Shelby, racing and automotive designer and former driver
- Koe Wetzel, country/southern rock singer
- Kendall Wright, professional American football player
