= Robert Lee Slaughter =

American rancher and oilman (1870–1938)

- Born: August 15, 1870; Palo Pinto County, Texas, US
- Died: September 29, 1938 (aged 68); Dallas, Texas
- Resting place: East Oakwood Cemetery, Fort Worth, Texas, US
- Occupations: Rancher, oilman
- Spouse: Florence Harris
- Children: Robert Slaughter, Jr.
- Parent(s): C.C. Slaughter; Cynthia Ann Jowell
- Relatives: George Webb Slaughter (paternal grandfather); William B. Slaughter (paternal uncle); Ira P. DeLoache (brother-in-law)

Robert Lee Slaughter (August 15, 1870 – September 29, 1938) was an American rancher and oilman. He was the owner of ranches in Texas and Sonora, Mexico.

== Early life ==
Robert Lee Slaughter was born on August 15, 1870, in Palo Pinto County, Texas. His father, C.C. Slaughter, was a large rancher. His paternal grandfather, George Webb Slaughter, was a Baptist minister from Mississippi.

Slaughter grew up in Dallas, Texas, where he was educated at an academy run by G. W. Grove in Dallas, Texas.

== Career ==
Slaughter became the manager of the Long S Ranch, a 1,000,000-acre ranch in Dawson County, Texas, owned by his father, in 1888. By 1909, Slaughter joined the Soash Development Company, a real estate development company run by William P. Soash. He helped develop the new town of Soash, Texas. From 1915 to 1919, he managed the Lazy S Ranch in Hockley County, Texas, whose headquarters were located in Sundown, Texas.

Slaughter acquired a ranch near Moctezuma in Sonora, Mexico with his brother-in-law, George T. Veal. The ranch was heavily damaged by Yaquis, a Native American tribe, during the Mexican Revolution of 1910–1920. They also acquired a ranch near El Paso, Texas.

Slaughter co-founded the Lone Star Land Company with William P. Soash, his brother Dick Slaughter and his sister Minnie Slaughter Veal in 1924. They founded the towns of Sundown and Vealmoor. They also sold portions of land from their Long S Ranch and Lazy S Ranch for real estate development.

By 1937, oil was discovered and drilled by Texaco on the Lazy S Ranch. By the time of his death, Slaughter was the "owner of extensive oil property".

== Personal life ==
Slaughter married Florence Harris in 1893. They had a son, Robert Slaughter Jr. They resided in Midland, Texas, until 1921, when they moved to Lubbock, Texas.

Slaughter enjoyed driving cars fast on his ranches.

== Death and legacy ==
Slaughter became ill in 1937. He received medical treatment in New York City, before returning to a hospital in Dallas. He died on September 29, 1938, in Dallas, Texas. His funeral was held in Dallas on October 1, 1938. He was buried at the East Oakwood Cemetery in Fort Worth, Texas.

Slaughter's son inherited his ranches, and died in 1969.

His papers are held in the Southwest Collection/Special Collections Library at Texas Tech University.
