= Scharbauer =

Scharbauer may refer to:

== People ==
- Clarence Scharbauer (1879–1942), American rancher, oilman, banker
- Clarence Scharbauer, Jr. (1925–2014), American rancher and horsebreeder.
- John Scharbauer (1852–1941), American rancher, oilman, banker

== Other ==
- Scharbauer Cattle Company, a cattle ranching company in Texas and New Mexico, USA
- Scharbauer Hotel, a historic hotel in Midland, Texas, USA
