= Courtney Baron =

American playwright and screenwriter

- Born: 1971 or 1972 (age 53–54); Dallas, Texas, U.S.
- Education: University of Texas, Austin (BA); Columbia University (MFA)
- Occupations: playwright, screenwriter
- Spouse: Blair Singer
- Father: Fred Baron

Courtney Baron (born 1971/1972) is an American playwright and screenwriter. Her plays include A Very Common Procedure (MCC Theater), Earlstreetman (New York Theatre Workshop), Eat Your Heart Out (Actors Theatre of Louisville), Consumption (Guthrie Theater), Morbidity & Mortality (Magic Theatre), Here I Lie (59E59 Theaters), and When It's You (Keen Company).

Barron's plays are published by Concord Theatricals. She has been a finalist for the Princess Grace Award and the American Theatre Critics Association's Osborn Award. She currently teaches on the playwriting faculty of Columbia University School of the Arts.

== Early life and education ==
Berman was born and raised in Dallas, Texas, to Wendy Baron, an architect with Morrison Seifert, and Fred Baron, an attorney and founding partner of Baron & Budd, P.C. Her stepmother is noted attorney Lisa Blue Baron.

Baron earned a B.A. in English from the University of Texas at Austin. She subsequently earned an M.F.A. in Playwriting from Columbia University in 1998.

== Career ==
=== Morbidity & Mortality ===
Bron's play Morbidity & Mortality was developed by the Cherry Lane Theatre's Mentor Project in April 2005. Mentored by David Auburn and directed by Peter DuBois, the cast featured Tasha Lawrence, Greg McFadden, and Maulik Pancholy. The creative team included Regina Garcia (sets), Rebecca Bernstein (costumes), Pat Dignan (lights), and Bart Fasbender (original music & sound). Morbidity & Mortality subsequently had its world premiere at the Magic Theatre in San Francisco from February 26 through April 9, 2006, produced in association with WP Theater. Directed by Loretta Greco, the cast featured Sasha Eden, Jonathan Leveck, and Hari Dhillon.

=== A Very Common Procedure ===
Baron's play A Very Common Procedure was produced Off-Broadway by MCC Theater at the Lucille Lortel Theatre from January 31 through March 10, 2007. Directed by Michael Greif, the cast featured Amir Arison, Lynn Collins, and Stephen Kunken. The creative team included Robin Vest (sets), Miranda Hoffman (costumes), Tyler Micoleau (lights), and Fabian Obispo (original music & sound). For his work in the production, Kunken was nominated for the Drama League Award for Distinguished Performance.

=== Here I Lie ===
Baron's play Here I Lie was produced Off-Broadway by 59E59 Theaters as part of their annual Summer Shorts Series, running from July 19 to August 31, 2019. Directed by Maria Mileaf, the cast featured Libe Barer and Robbie Tann. The creative team included Rebecca Lord-Surratt (sets), Amy Sutton (costumes), Greg MacPherson (lights), Nick Moore (original music & sound), Joshua Langman (projections), and Jenna Snyder (properties).

Baron's plays have been developed by the Royal Court Theatre, Manhattan Theatre Club, Atlantic Theater Company, and Primary Stages, among others.

On television, Baron was a staff writer and executive producer for the romance/comedy drama series Almost There on the Audience network starring Steven Pasquale. The program ran for one 10-episode season in 2015.

Since 2019, Baron has taught in the Graduate Playwriting Program at Columbia University School of the Arts. She previously served as an adjunct professor at New York University, The New School, and Stony Brook University.

== Reception ==
Baron's short play "The Blue Room" was a co-winner of the Heideman Award at Actors Theatre of Louisville in 1999, was presented in “Life Under 30” at the Humana Festival of New American Plays, and was nominated for the American Theatre Critics Association's Osborn Award. It has been published in numerous anthologies. She is the recipient of an Alfred P. Sloan Foundation commission from Manhattan Theatre Club.

The San Francisco Chronicle, in reviewing Morbidity & Mortality for the 2006 Magic Theatre production, called the play "Smart, modern, disarmingly funny and deeply affecting."

The New York Times, in reviewing her play Here I Lie for the 2019 59E59 Theaters Summer Shorts Series, noted

Here I Lie, a strange and strangely charming two-hander by Courtney Baron ends the program on a fizzy high — which seems like it ought not to be possible in a play whose twin strands concern Maris (Libe Barer), a young editor faking a fatal illness, and Joseph (Robbie Tann), a nurse whose own arcane symptoms are not what they appear. But such is the magic of Maria Mileaf’s impeccable production that warmth and pleasure find an amiable coexistence with determined self-destruction."

== Personal life ==
In 2003, Baron married Blair Gilbert Singer, and Emmy Award-nominated screenwriter and television producer.

== Plays ==
Her plays are published by Concord Theatricals' various imprints, including Samuel French, Inc., Dramatists Play Service, and Playscripts, Inc.

- Earlstreetman (New York Theatre Workshop, 2003)
- Morbidity & Mortality (Magic Theatre & WP Theater, 2006)
- A Very Common Procedure (MCC Theater, 2007)
- Consumption (Guthrie Theater, 2008)
- Eat Your Heart Out (Actors Theatre of Louisville, 2012)
- When It's You (Keen Company, 2017)
- Here I Lie (59E59 Theaters, 2019)
