= Vealmoor, Texas =

Town in the United States

Vealmoor
- Unincorporated area
- Location within Texas Location within the United States
- Coordinates: 32°31′14″N 101°34′13″W
- Country: United States
- State: Texas
- County: Howard County
- Elevation: 2,661 ft (811 m)

Population (2000)
  - Total: 179
- Time zone: UTC-6 (Central (CST))
  - Summer (DST): UTC-5 (CDT)
- GNIS feature ID: 1349214

Vealmoor, Texas is an unincorporated area and small community in Howard County, Texas, United States.

== History ==
The land was acquired by C. C. Slaughter in the 1880s. It was on his Lazy S Ranch.

In the early 1920s, Slaughter's sons Robert Lee Slaughter and Dick Slaughter, his daughter Minnie Slaughter Veal, and developer William P. Soash founded the new town via their Lone Star Land Company. The town had a post office by 1926.

The town had 190 inhabitants by 1966 and 179 by 2000.

== Education ==
All of Howard County is in the service area of Howard County Junior College District.
