= Soash =

Soash may refer to:

== People ==
- Dick Soash (1941–2019), American farmer, rancher and politician
- William P. Soash (1877–1961), American land developer

== Places ==
- Soash, Texas, ghost town, United States, named for William
