= Mallet Ranch =

Coordinates: 33.4086°N 102.5620°W

Location in Texas

The Mallet Ranch is a historic ranch in Texas. It was established in Hockley County, Texas in the 1880s. It was used to raise Hereford cattle from the 1900s to the 1930s, with cotton fields added in the mid-1920s. By the late 1930s, oil was discovered. The ranch spanned 45,000 acres in 1990.

== History ==
The ranch was established by David M. DeVitt and John Scharbauer in Hockley County, Texas in 1885. The name, "Mallet Ranch", came from a former ranch established by D. P. Atwood on the Texas-Mexican border in the early 1880s. DeVitt and Scharbauer acquired more land in Terry County, Cochran County and Yoakum County.

The main ranchhouse, windmill and "several bunkhouses, sheds, barns, and corrals" were located in Levelland, Texas or Sundown, Texas six miles north of modern-day Whiteface, Texas.

Lawsuits over ownership of the land were filed against C.C. Slaughter, the owner of several ranches including the Lazy S Ranch, in the early 1900s. The dispute originated from messy leasing claims. By the early 1900s, the Mallet Land and Cattle Company was corporated to ensure ownership.

The ranch was used by DeVitt to raise Hereford cattle from 1904 to 1934. By 1925-1926, DeVitt turned 6,000 acres into cotton fields. It was inherited by DeVitt's daughters Helen and Christine in 1934. While Helen became a philanthropist in Lubbock, Texas, it was Christine who oversaw the ranch; she also founded the CH Foundation. By the late 1930s, oil was discovered on the ranch. Meanwhile, the Mallet Land and Cattle Company was disestablished for tax purposes in 1944. The ranch headquarters have been "neglected" since 1983, when heiress and philanthropist Christine DeVitt died.

The ranch spanned 45,000 acres in 1990. In 2008, the headquarters were on the annual list of Texas' Most Endangered Places published by Preservation Texas, an architectural conservation non-profit organization.

Historical papers about the ranch are held in the Southwest Collection/Special Collections Library at Texas Tech University.
