= Coldwater, Sherman County, Texas =

Ghost town in Sherman County, Texas

Coldwater is a ghost town in Sherman County, Texas, United States. It was the county seat from 1889 to 1901.

== History ==
The town was founded on a ranch owned by William B. Slaughter, son of C.C. Slaughter. According to the Handbook of Texas Online, "By 1891 a hotel, a courthouse, a jail, and a mercantile store had been erected." Two years later, in 1893, a newspaper called the Sherman County Banner was started by Charles Randolph and George Loomis.

The post office closed down in 1907. A brickhouse on the ranch was still used as a church until 1940.

Coldwater is now the location of the Coldwater gas field.
