= Bledsoe, Texas =

- Unincorporated community Census designated place
- Location within the state of Texas Bledsoe (the United States)
- Coordinates: 33°37′09″N 103°01′17″W
- Country: United States
- State: Texas
- County: Cochran

Population (1990 est.)
  - Total: 125
- Time zone: UTC-6 (Central (CST))
  - Summer (DST): UTC-5 (CDT)
- ZIP codes: 79314
- Area code: 806
- FIPS code: 48-08644

Bledsoe is an unincorporated community and census designated place (CDP) in western Cochran County, Texas, United States, located near the New Mexico border. It is approximately 68 miles west of Lubbock. As of the 2020 census, Bledsoe had a population of 56.

== History ==
Bledsoe was founded in 1925 as the terminus of the Panhandle and Santa Fe Railway, and named for Samuel T. Bledsoe, the line's president. The town gained its original prosperity through its function as a cattle-shipping station, and reached its greatest population of 400 in 1930. The Great Depression had dire effect on the community and throughout the remainder of the 20th century the population continued to dwindle; the last recorded figure put the 1990 population at 125.

== Education ==
It is within the Whiteface Consolidated Independent School District. The former Bledsoe Independent School District merged into Whiteface CISD on July 1, 1996.

== Demographics ==
Historical population
Census	Pop.	Note	%±
2020	56		—
U.S. Decennial Census; 1850–1900 1910; 1920 1930 1940; 1950 1960 1970; 1980 1990 2000; 2010 2020

Bledsoe first appeared as a census designated place in the 2020 U.S. census.

=== 2020 census ===
Bledsoe CDP, Texas – Racial and ethnic composition Note: the US Census treats Hispanic/Latino as an ethnic category. This table excludes Latinos from the racial categories and assigns them to a separate category. Hispanics/Latinos may be of any race.
Race / Ethnicity (NH = Non-Hispanic)	Pop 2020	% 2020
White alone (NH)	22	39.29%
Black or African American alone (NH)	0	0.00%
Native American or Alaska Native alone (NH)	0	0.00%
Asian alone (NH)	0	0.00%
Native Hawaiian or Pacific Islander alone (NH)	0	0.00%
Other race alone (NH)	0	0.00%
Mixed race or Multiracial (NH)	0	0.00%
Hispanic or Latino (any race)	34	60.71%
Total	56	100.00%
