= John Slaughter =

John Slaughter may refer to:

- John Brooks Slaughter (born 1934), American engineer, Director of National Science Foundation, 1980–1982
- John Bunyan Slaughter (1848–1928), American rancher and banker.
- John Horton Slaughter (1841–1922), American lawman, Civil War soldier and gambler known as Texas John Slaughter
- Texas John Slaughter (TV series) series on Wonderful World of Disney, 1958–1961
- John Slaughter (MP), Member of Parliament (MP) for Gloucestershire
- John Slaughter (guitarist) (1944-2010), member of Chris Barber's jazz band
