= William Slaughter =

William Slaughter may refer to:

- William B. Slaughter (politician), American politician
- William B. Slaughter (rancher), American rancher, cattle driver, banker and county judge
- Billy Slaughter, American actor
- William Capel Slaughter, co-founder of international law firm Slaughter and May
