= Whiteface, Texas =

- Community
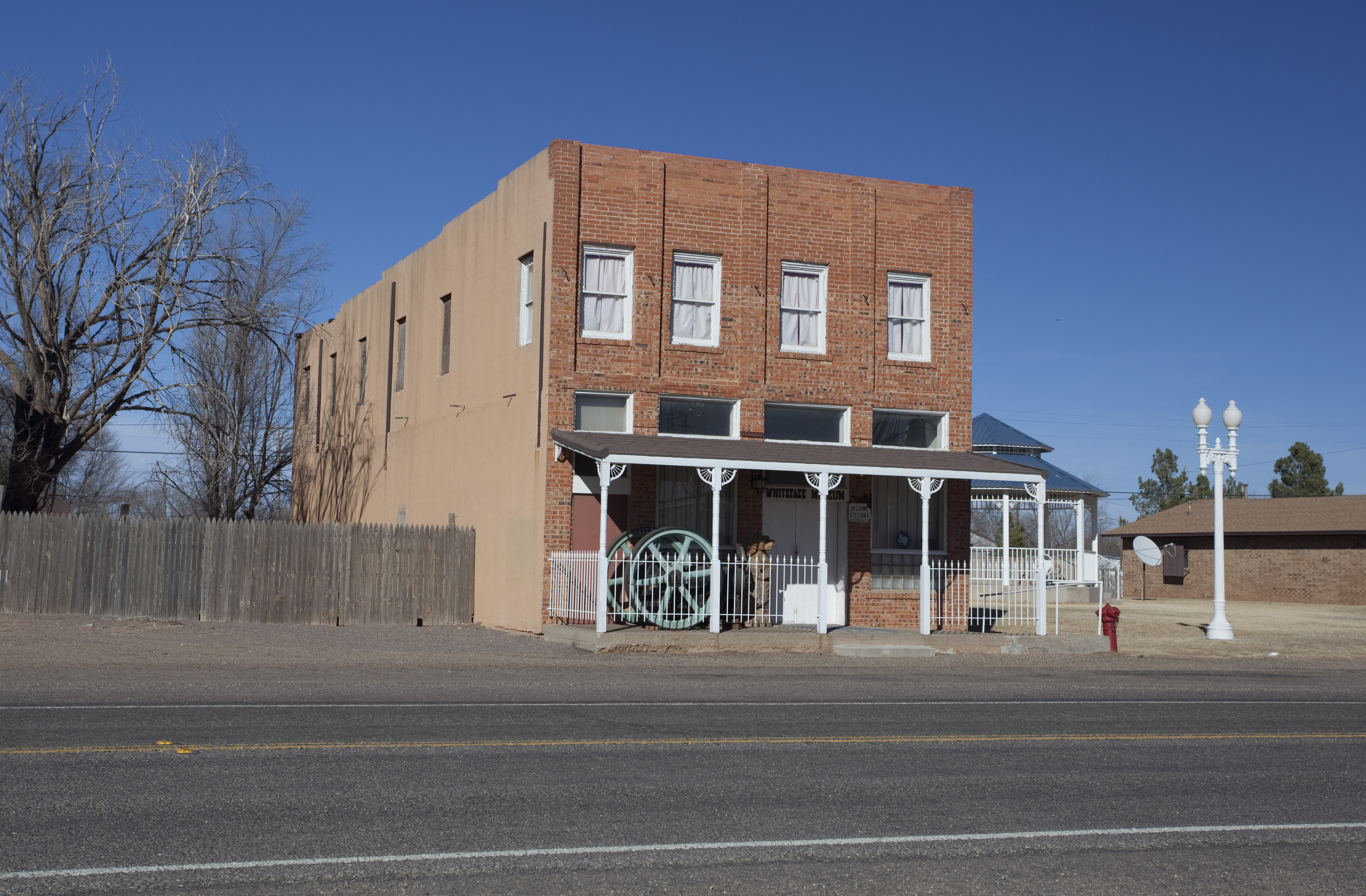
- Former Whiteface Hotel, now a museum

- Location within Texas Location within the United States
- Coordinates: 33°36′00″N 102°36′50″W
- Country: United States
- State: Texas
- County: Cochran
- Region: Llano Estacado
- Established: 1924

Area
  - Total: 0.59 sq mi (1.52 km^{2})
  - Land: 0.59 sq mi (1.52 km^{2})
  - Water: 0 sq mi (0.00 km^{2})
- Elevation: 3,681 ft (1,122 m)

Population (2020)
  - Total: 375
  - Estimate (2019): 412
  - Density: 700.1/sq mi (270.32/km^{2})
- Time zone: UTC-6 (CST)
- ZIP code: 79379
- Area code: 806
- FIPS code: 48-78328
- Website: www.whiteface.tx.citygovt.org

Whiteface is a town in Cochran County, Texas, United States. As of the 2020 census, Whiteface had a population of 375.

== History ==
According to the Handbook of Texas, "The name of the town came from rancher C. C. Slaughter's Whiteface Camp and Whiteface Pasture, which were named, in turn, for the cattle on his ranch." By 1924, Slaughter's son-in-law, Ira P. DeLoache, turned the ranch into the new community of Whiteface.

The community was moved several miles the next year to be at the railroad. Oil was discovered near the town in 1937. It was incorporated in 1945.

== Geography ==
Whiteface is located on the high plains of the Llano Estacado at 33°36′00″N 102°36′50″W (33.6000974, –102.6138084).

According to the United States Census Bureau, the town has a total area of 0.58 square miles (1.5 km^{2}), all land.

Whiteface is located on State Highway 114, 44 miles (71 km) west of Lubbock and 12 miles (19 km) southeast of Morton, the Cochran County seat.

== Demographics ==
Historical population
Census	Pop.	Note	%±
1950	579		—
1960	535		−7.6%
1970	394		−26.4%
1980	463		17.5%
1990	512		10.6%
2000	465		−9.2%
2010	449		−3.4%
2020	375		−16.5%
U.S. Decennial Census

=== 2020 census ===
Whiteface racial composition (NH = Non-Hispanic) (Note: Note: the US Census treats Hispanic/Latino as an ethnic category. This table excludes Latinos from the racial categories and assigns them to a separate category. Hispanics/Latinos can be of any race.)
Race	Number	Percentage
White (NH)	162	43.2%
Black or African American (NH)	6	1.6%
Native American or Alaska Native (NH)	4	1.07%
Mixed or multiracial (NH)	4	1.07%
Hispanic or Latino	199	53.07%
Total	375	

As of the 2020 United States census, 375 people, 133 households, and 98 families were residing in the town.

=== 2000 census ===
As of the 2000 census, 465 people, 163 households, and 125 families resided in the town. The population density was 799.8 inhabitants per square mile (308.8/km^{2}). The 207 housing units averaged 356.0 per square mile (137.8/km^{2}). The racial makeup of the town was 67.53% White, 2.80% African American, 2.58% Native American, 26.45% from other races, and 0.65% from two or more races. Hispanics or Latinos of any race were 45.16% of the population.

Of the 163 households, 47.2% had children under 18 living with them, 59.5% were married couples living together, 10.4% had a female householder with no husband present, and 23.3% were not families. About 22.1% of all households were made up of individuals, and 10.4% had someone living alone who was 65 or older. The average household size was 2.85 and the average family size was 3.37.

In the town, the population was distributed as 35.1% under 18, 6.7% from 18 to 24, 31.8% from 25 to 44, 16.3% from 45 to 64, and 10.1% who were 65 or older. The median age was 33 years. For every 100 females, there were 91.4 males. For every 100 females age 18 and over, there were 92.4 males.

The median income for a household in the town was $30,833, and for a family was $37,500. Males had a median income of $27,321 versus $17,500 for females. The per capita income for the town was $15,060. About 10.8% of families and 14.4% of the population were below the poverty line, including 20.4% of those under age 18 and 13.7% of those age 65 or over.

== Education ==
The city of Whiteface is served by the Whiteface Consolidated Independent School District and home to the Whiteface High School Antelopes.

== See also ==
- Morton, Texas
- Muleshoe National Wildlife Refuge
- Eastern New Mexico
- Llano Estacado
