= Ware, Texas =

Ghost town in Texas, US

- Ghost town
- Location in Texas
- Coordinates: 36.1795751°N 102.7156322°W
- Country: United States
- State: Texas
- County: Dallam
- Established: 1906

Ware is a ghost town in southern Dallam County, Texas, United States. It is situated 13 miles northwest of Dalhart.

A station of the Fort Worth and Denver Railway, it was established in 1906 or 1907, by land developer William P. Soash, who built a hotel. By 1947, the town had a population of 20, and had a school and general store. It later became a ghost town. On May 18, 2010, Ware was the location for an EF0 tornado, and on June 8, 2025, an EFU tornado appeared on in field near Ware.
