= Whiteface Consolidated Independent School District =

School district in Texas

Coordinates: 33°36′3″N 102°37′5″W

Address
- 401 Antelope Blvd Whiteface, Texas, 79379; United States

District information
- Type: Public
- Grades: PK–12
- Superintendent: Joshua Damron
- Governing agency: Texas Education Agency
- Schools: 1
- NCES District ID: 4845570

Students and staff
- Enrollment: 329 (2022–2023)
- Teachers: 35.53 (on an FTE basis)
- Student–teacher ratio: 9.26

Other information
- Website: www.whitefaceschool.net

Whiteface Consolidated Independent School District is a public school district based in Whiteface, Texas (USA). Located in Cochran County, the district extends into small portions of Hockley and Lamb counties. It also serves Bledsoe.

== History ==
The Hockley County Commissioners Court established two school districts in Cochran County, School District No. 3 and School District No. 5, on April 5, 1921. No. 5 became the Lehman/Whiteface School District. In 1925 a rancher, J. C. Whaley, built a one-room schoolhouse that was Whiteface's first school. The school opened in September 1925. During that year the Lehman/Whiteface district voted in favor of a $60,000 bond that would build a brick school building, each valued at $30,000, in all of the communities served by the district. G. S. Glenn of Littlefield served as the architect and Miller & Rogers of Levelland won the bid for construction of the Whiteface School, which opened in September 1926 for elementary school students.

In 1928 the Lehman/Whiteface district separated into two separate common school districts. Whiteface Common School District No. 8 served Whiteface. In 1929 the Whiteface School applied to become a high school program, and its request was granted. The Cobleland School was consolidated into the Whiteface district on July 1, 1935. During the same year, Boydell Common School District #1 became a part of the Whiteface district. On August 14, 1935, the Whiteface school district adopted the new name Whiteface Independent School District. The Cobleland brick school building was moved to Whiteface so it could become an annex to the Whiteface building.

The citizens approved a bond in 1945 that allowed for the construction of a new cafeteria. On November 26, 1945, the board meet to discuss contracts. Haynes & Strange was chosen as the construction company, and W. L. Scott Architects was chosen as the architect. In 1946 the district began receiving oil and mineral revenues. For each hole of oil drilled, the school district received $50. The total revenue amount was $90,000.

In 1948 the Lehman school district merged into Whiteface. During that year, the district's first library was installed at the school, and the American football stadium was built. The stadium's lighting had been purchased from the General Electric Corporation. In 1949 the school district added vocational agriculture to its curriculum. During that year, Girlstown U.S.A. had been opened in the former Duggan headquarters. This brought additional students into the Whiteface school system. In 1952 Avery-Pierce & Norton, a contract company, built the Whiteface elementary school and gymnasium. On June 18, 1962, the citizens voted to abolish segregation, causing the district to make immediate plans to integrate black students into white schools. In the northern hemisphere fall of 1962 the first black students attended high school classes.

In August 1978 the Pep Independent School District of Pep was consolidated into the Whiteface district, and the Whiteface district was renamed the Whiteface Consolidated Independent School District. In 1979 the district built a new elementary school facility with a cafeteria;Pharr Construction was the construction company and Huckabee & Donham was the architect. During that year, the district demolished the 1952 elementary school. The district built phase I of the new high school in 1982. The high school includes the tax collector office and the office of the superintendent. In July 1986 phase II of the high school was completed. A gymnasium and swimming pool were included in Phase II. Both phases of the high school had a total price of $10 million.

In 1989 Whiteface ISD began taking middle and high school students from the Bledsoe Independent School District. On July 1, 1996, Bledsoe ISD merged into Whiteface CISD.

In 2009, the school district was given a "academically acceptable" by the Texas Education Agency.

For the 2021–2022 school year, the school district was given a "B" by the Texas Education Agency.

== Schools ==
- Whiteface High School (grades 6–12)
- Whiteface Elementary School (grades PK–5)

The 1952 Avery Pierce-Norton gymnasium is used for junior high school and high school basketball, volleyball, and physical education.

The district sold the school it used for black students to Whiteface Cooperative Inc.; the district had been integrated beginning in 1962.

== Special programs ==
=== Athletics ===
Whiteface High School plays six-man football.
