= Whiteface High School =

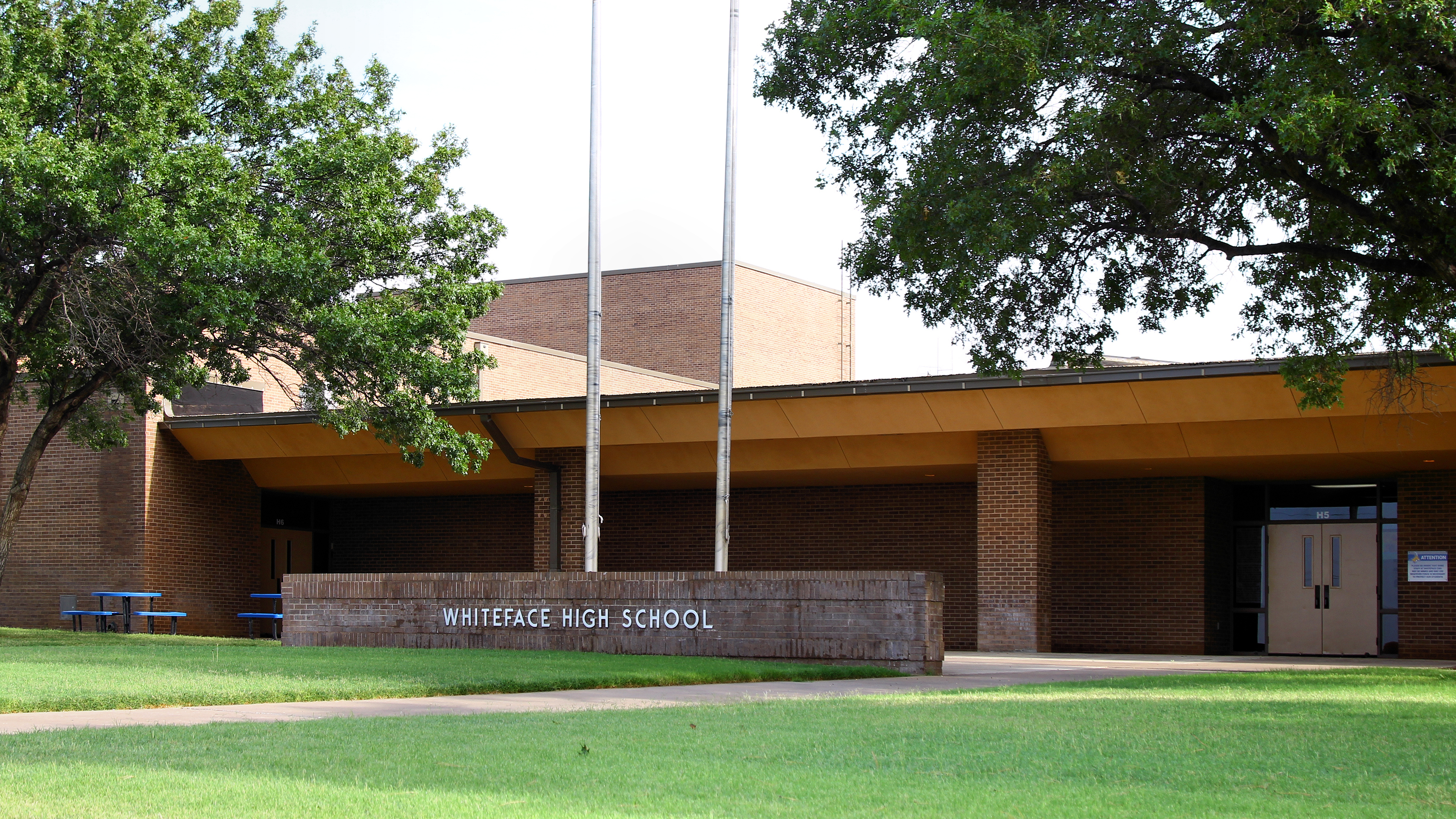

Location
- 401 Antelope Boulevard; Whiteface, Texas 79379-0007; United States; 33.600836°N 102.618062°W

Information
- School type: Public high school
- School district: Whiteface Consolidated Independent School District
- Principal: Chris Mendez
- Teaching staff: 33.89 (FTE)
- Grades: PK-12
- Enrollment: 325 (2023–2024)
- Student to teacher ratio: 9.59
- Colors: Blue & Yellow
- Athletics conference: UIL Class A
- Mascot: Antelope
- Website: Whiteface High School

Whiteface High School is a public high school located in Whiteface, Texas (USA) and classified as a 1A school by the UIL. It is part of the Whiteface Consolidated Independent School District located in far east central Cochran County. Neighboring Pep ISD consolidated in 1978 with Whiteface. For the 2021-2022 school year, the school was given a "B" by the Texas Education Agency. Went to state in football 2024.

== Athletics ==
The Whiteface Antelopes compete in the following sports:

- Baseball
- Basketball
- Cross Country
- 6-Man Football
- Golf
- Powerlifting
- Tennis
- Track and Field

=== State Titles ===
- Girls Basketball
  - 1997(1A)
- One Act Play
  - 1998(1A)
- Marching Band
  - 2017(1A)
