= John Bunyan Slaughter =

American rancher and banker (1838–1928)

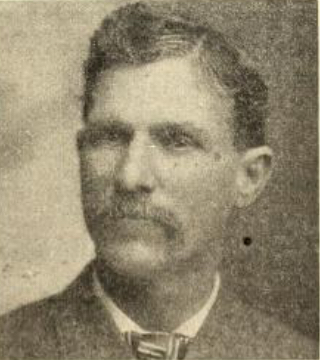
- Slaughter in a 1925 publication
- Born: December 15, 1848; Sabine County, Texas, U.S.
- Died: November 11, 1928 (aged 79)
- Resting place: East Oakwood Cemetery, Fort Worth, Texas, U.S.
- Occupations: Rancher, banker
- Spouses: May Burris; Isabella Masten May
- Children: 3, including John B. Slaughter, Jr.
- Parent(s): George Webb Slaughter; Sarah Mason
- Relatives: Christopher Columbus Slaughter (brother); William B. Slaughter (brother)

John Bunyan Slaughter (December 15, 1848 – November 11, 1928) was an American rancher and banker. Born to a ranching family, Slaughter ranched in Texas and New Mexico before acquiring the U Lazy S Ranch in Garza County, Texas, in 1901 and managing it for nearly three decades.

== Early life ==
Slaughter was born on December 15, 1848, in Sabine County, Texas. His father, George Webb Slaughter, was a Baptist minister from Mississippi who became a rancher in Texas. He grew up in Palo Pinto County, Texas.

== Career ==
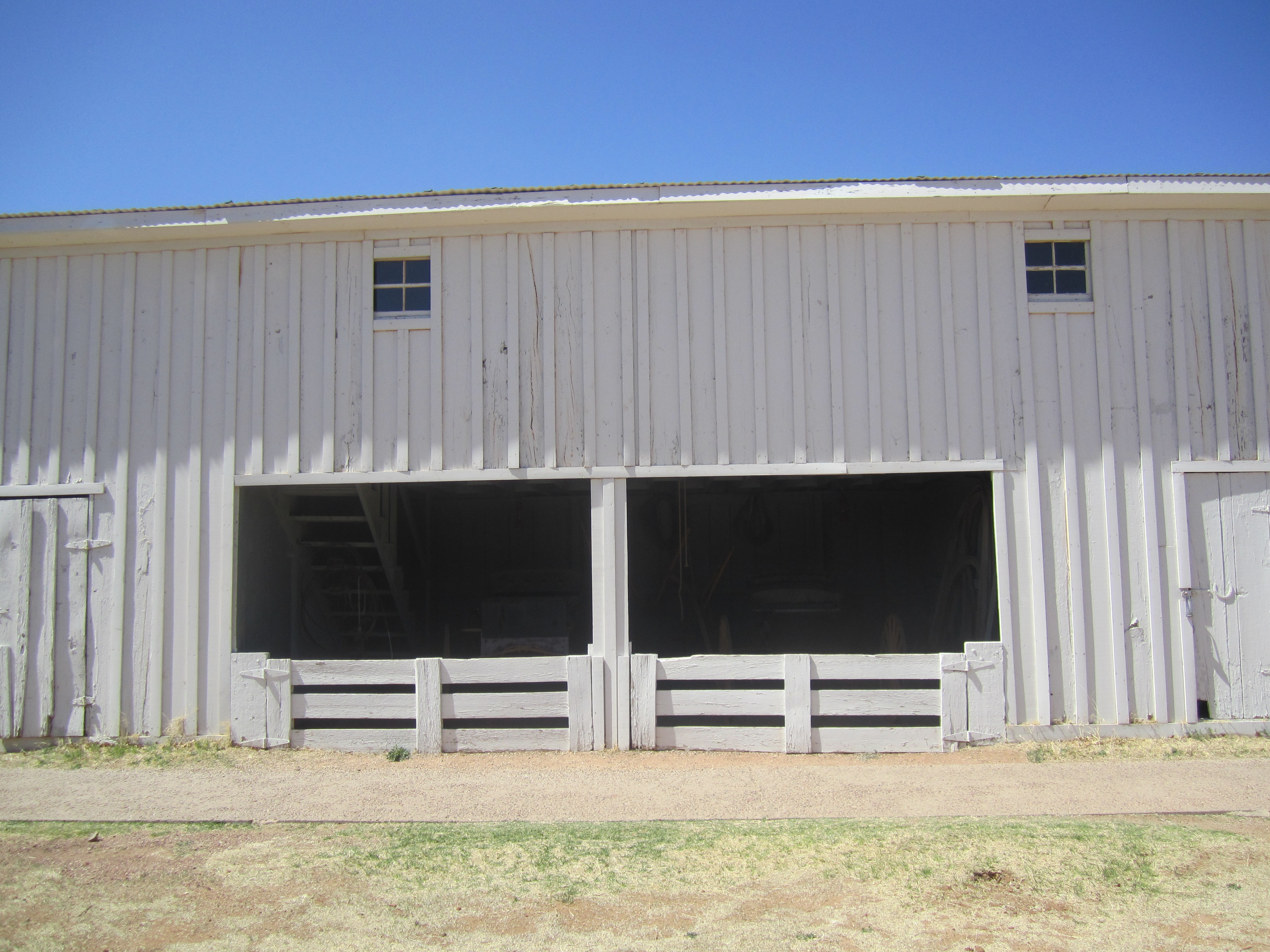
U Lazy S Carriage House, now at the National Ranching Heritage Center in Lubbock, Texas.

Slaughter became a cattle driver with his brothers, John and C.C., when the three men drove cattle on the Chisholm Trail all the way to Abilene, Kansas, in 1866. In the 1870s, Slaughter and his brother John claimed rangeland near McDonald Creek in Crosby County, Texas. The two brothers raised cattle on their ranch and drove it to Kansas, where they sold it annually.

They sold the ranch in 1883 and claimed rangeland in Socorro County, New Mexico. However, a shootout occurred on October 30–31, 1884, between the Slaughters's cowboys and cowboys hired by Solomon Luna, another rancher. When Luna sued the Slaughters, he won the lawsuit. Meanwhile, Slaughter ranched near the Green River in Utah, followed by eastern New Mexico.

Slaughter acquired a ranch in Glasscock County, Texas, in 1890 which he managed it until 1898, when he sold it. He was the vice president of the People's National Bank of Colorado City, Texas.

Slaughter acquired the 99,188-acre U Lazy S Ranch in 1901. He was its manager for 27 years. In 1902, he built a ranchhouse, which was subsequently listed as a Texas landmark. In 1906, he sold 50,000 acres to C. W. Post, who founded the new town of Post, Texas.

== Personal life ==
Slaughter married May Burris in 1877. She died in 1879. He married Isabella Masten May, a member of the Methodist Episcopal Church, South, in 1880. They had three children. They first lived on a homestead in Crosby County until they moved into a mansion in Fort Worth, Texas, followed by a mansion on their ranch in Garza County.

== Death and legacy ==
Slaughter died on November 11, 1928. He was buried at the East Oakwood Cemetery in Fort Worth. His widow died in 1947. His son, John B. Slaughter Jr., inherited the U Lazy S Ranch.
