= Preston Hollow, Dallas =

Neighborhood in Dallas, Texas, US

Preston Hollow
- Neighborhood in Dallas, Texas
- Interactive map of Preston Hollow
- Coordinates: 32.883°N 96.802°W
- Country: United States
- State: Texas
- County: Dallas
- City: Dallas
- Area: North Dallas
- ZIP Codes: 75220, 75225, 75230
- Area codes: 214, 469, 972

Preston Hollow is a neighborhood in North Dallas, Texas. It is bordered on the south by the city of University Park.

== History ==
Beginning in the 1850s, the first settlers began receiving land grants for Preston Hollow’s land. Among them were the Lively family on Guernsey Lane, the Howell family, and the Meaders family. Other smaller farms, such as the dairy farm at 6303 Meadow, were also in Preston Hollow.

In the 1920s, the first people started moving to Preston Hollow for residential purposes. Ralph Stichter was the first, purchasing many acres at the northeast corner of Preston and Walnut Hill. He built two estates on his property, one right at the corner and another at what is now 6126 Lakehurst, which still stands, in 1922.

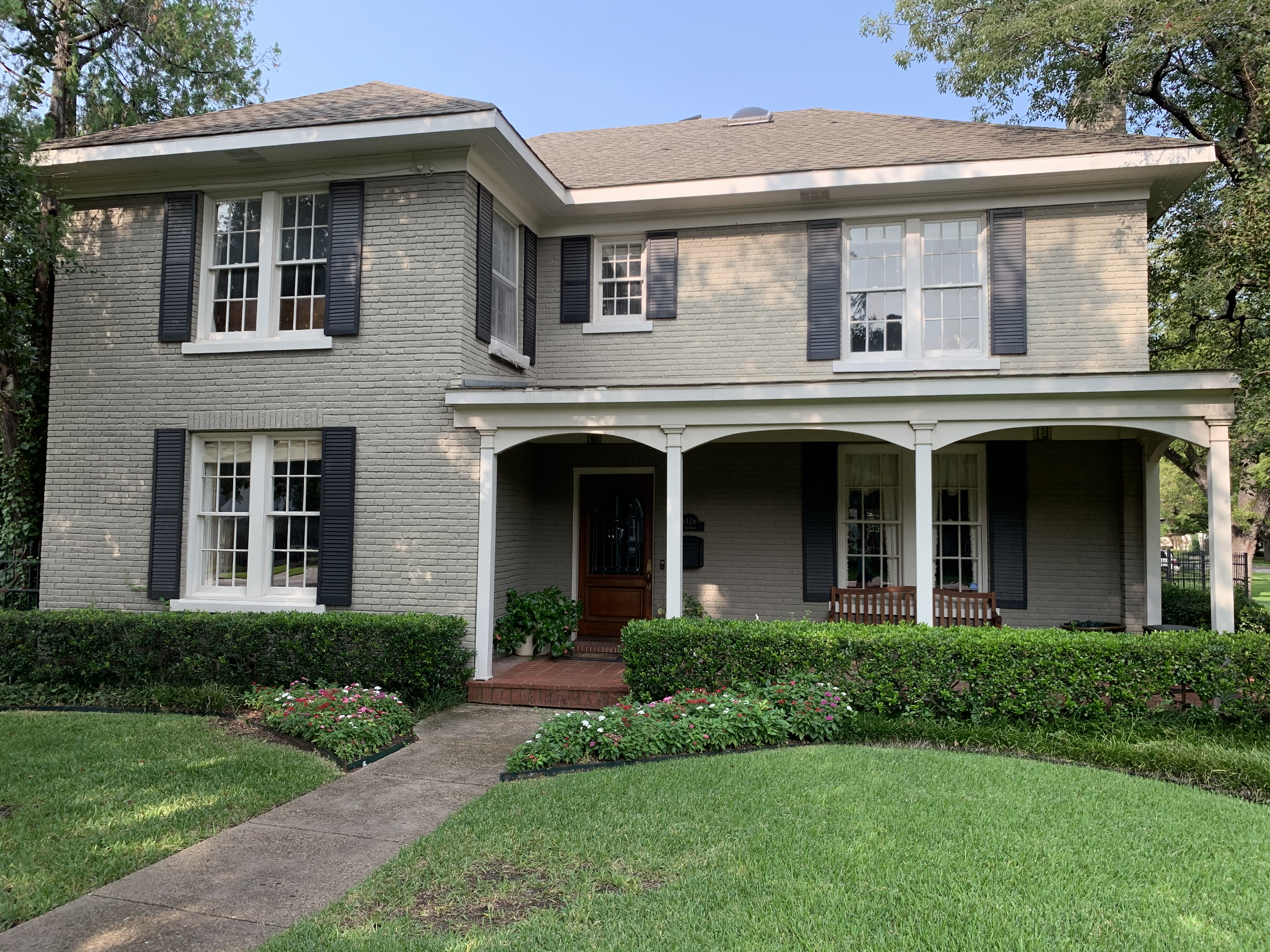
6126 Lakehurst (1922)

That same year, real estate developer Ira P. DeLoache first noticed the area. In 1924, DeLoache bought a 56-acre (23 ha) farm; Preston Hollow's first lots were carved out of the former farm parcels. He built his real estate office at what is now Ebby’s Little White House in 1926. DeLoache and Al Joyce developed Preston Hollow, with development mainly occurring in the 1930s. Famous architect Charles Dilbeck designed many monumental homes throughout the neighborhood in the 1930s and early 1940s. At first, Preston Road was the area's only connection to Downtown Dallas. Terry Box of The Dallas Morning News said that the Northwest Highway "was nothing more than muddy right of way." The area that would later become Preston Center was a dairy farm in the early to mid-20th Century.

The developers intended Preston Hollow to be what Box said was "more than a flatland suburb on the fringes of a new and growing Dallas." Doctors, entrepreneurs, industrialists, lawyers, and oil businesspeople moved to Preston Hollow. Many built country-style estates that housed horses and stables. A private school which later became St. Mark's School of Texas opened in the area.

In the early 1930s, during the Depression, Edward James Solon, the treasurer of a company called Interstate and the partner who came with Karl Hoblitzelle from Chicago to Dallas, purchased a Preston Hollow corner property at Douglas and Averill Way. DeLoache built a Dillbeck-designed house on the property. This Tudor-styled home was considered the beginning of the many large estates built in what is now termed the Old Preston Hollow area—an earlier large house in the area, by the pond near Avrill, was considered as part of the farm.

In the 1930s, moving beyond Northwest Highway was considered "going into the sticks" and risky in terms of attracting affluent homeowners. Later, many people said that E.J. Solon's estate started the North Dallas migration.

Preston Hollow was officially incorporated as a municipality in 1939, and DeLoache’s real estate office/Ebby’s Little White House turned into the town hall.

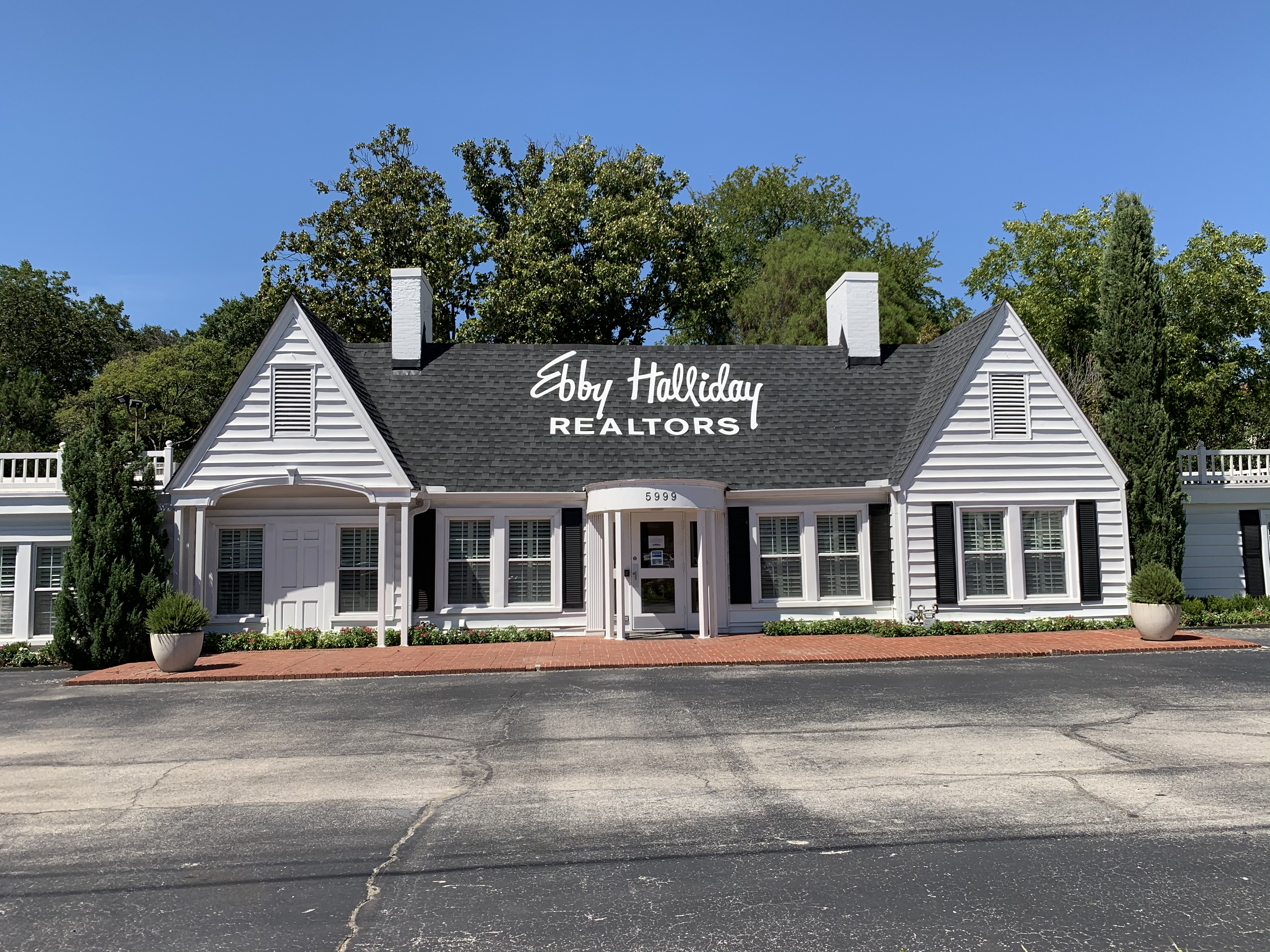
The former Preston Hollow Town Hall

Provisioned by the Preston Road Fresh Water Supply District, the North Dallas town of Preston Hollow was named for the dark wooded area with creeks and hollows extending westward from Preston Road. The westward boundary is generally agreed to be Marsh Lane.

In 1945, Preston Hollow residents voted to join the city of Dallas, and the municipality was annexed to Dallas shortly after that. That same year, the residents of Preston Hollow's southern neighbor, University Park and its southern neighbor, Highland Park, (collectively, the Park Cities) voted to remain independent municipalities.

The book, Preston Hollow: A Brief History, covers the history of the neighborhood from the first settlers in the 1850s to the 2019 tornado. A neighborhood Facebook group called “Preston Hollow History” shares more historical information.

Despite a 1948 U. S. Supreme Court ruling that state courts cannot enforce race-based restrictions on the occupancy of real estate, a covenant was enacted in 1956 for 17 lots in the James Meaders Estates subdivision of Preston Hollow, which stated that only white residents were allowed to live on those lots unless they were "domestic servants of a different race or nationality in the employ of a tenant." In July 2000 the residents repealed this restriction.

Teardowns of mid-20th century ranch-style houses in portions of Preston Hollow began after land values increased in the 1980s.

In September 2008, Preston Hollow returned to national headlines when New York Post gossip columnist Cindy Adams wrote a column claiming that U.S. President George W. Bush and his wife Laura had purchased a home in Preston Hollow. Described as "a big house on five acres," Adams also claimed that this house would have "horse stables, lake views, mountain views, golf club views" and that Preston Hollow is "a town outside Dallas." Dallas media pointed out the significant factual errors in the column (perhaps, most glaringly, Dallas's location in a non-mountainous region of Texas) and noted that the real estate agent cited denied both the report or that the Post had ever contacted her.

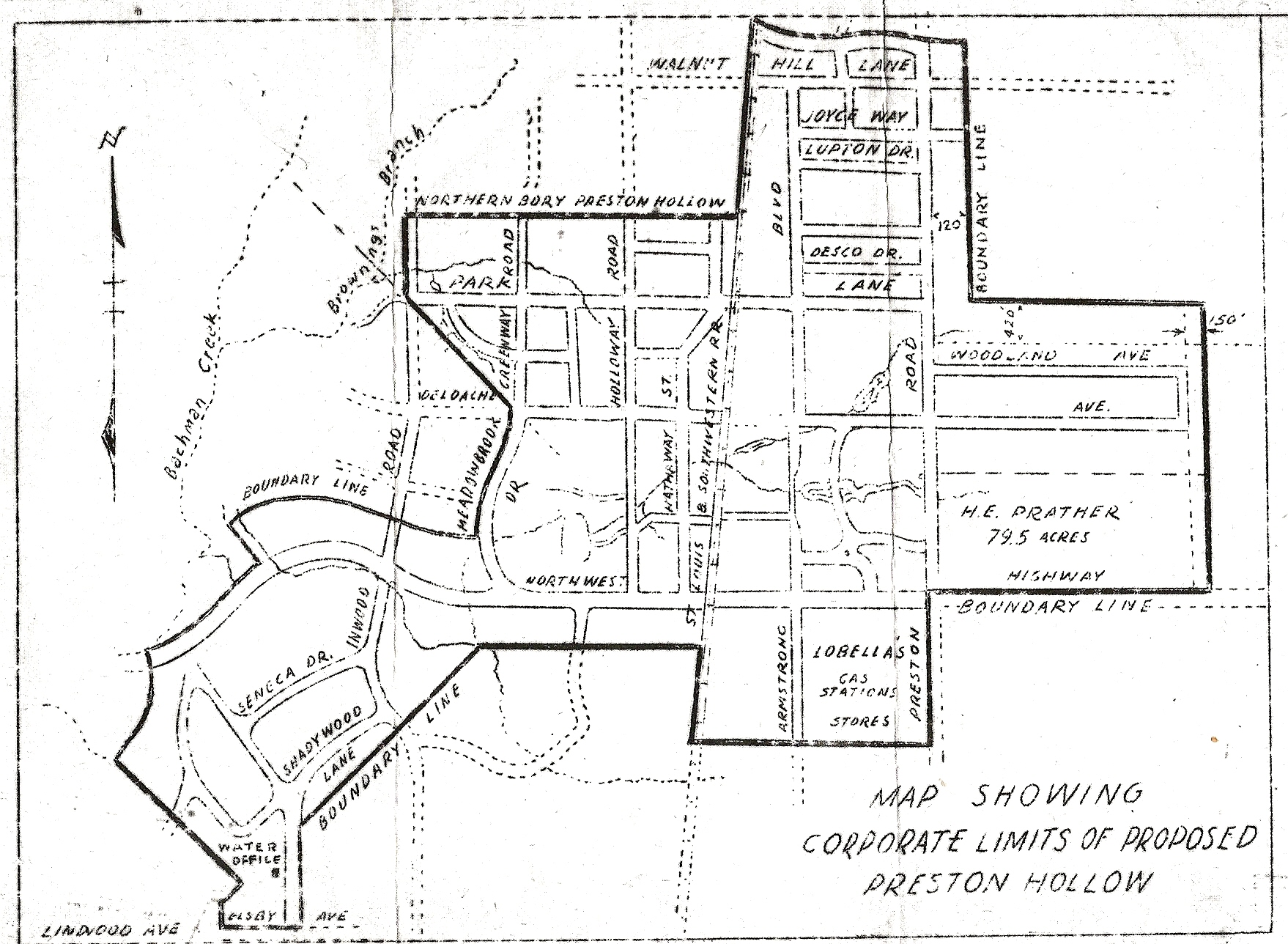
A map of Old Preston Hollow

== Residents ==
Politicians include former U.S. President George W. Bush, former Dallas mayors Tom Leppert and Laura Miller and her husband, retired Texas legislator Steve Wolens; and Christina Crain, the namesake of the Christina Crain Unit women's prison and former chairperson of the Texas Board of Criminal Justice.

Business executives included the late Ross Perot, energy tycoon the late T. Boone Pickens, and include former American Airlines chairman Bob Crandall, software developer Larry Lacerte, Stream Energy Chairman Rob Snyder, and included the investor the late Harold Simmons.

Sports and entertainment figures include Dallas Mavericks owner Mark Cuban, former Dallas Mavericks player Dirk Nowitzki, former Dallas Mavericks player Luka Dončić, former Dallas Cowboys players Roger Staubach, Daryl Johnston, and Chuck Howley, previous Dallas Stars owner Tom Hicks, former Dallas Cowboys football coach Wade Phillips, golfer Lee Trevino, golfer Jordan Spieth, and current Dallas Stars player Tyler Seguin.

Noted residents of Old Preston Hollow who are now deceased include ClubCorp founder Robert H. Dedman Sr., trial lawyer and Democratic Party fundraiser Fred Baron and his wife Lisa Blue Baron, and Mary Kay founder Mary Kay Ash.

Neo-Nazi Richard B. Spencer grew up in Preston Hollow.

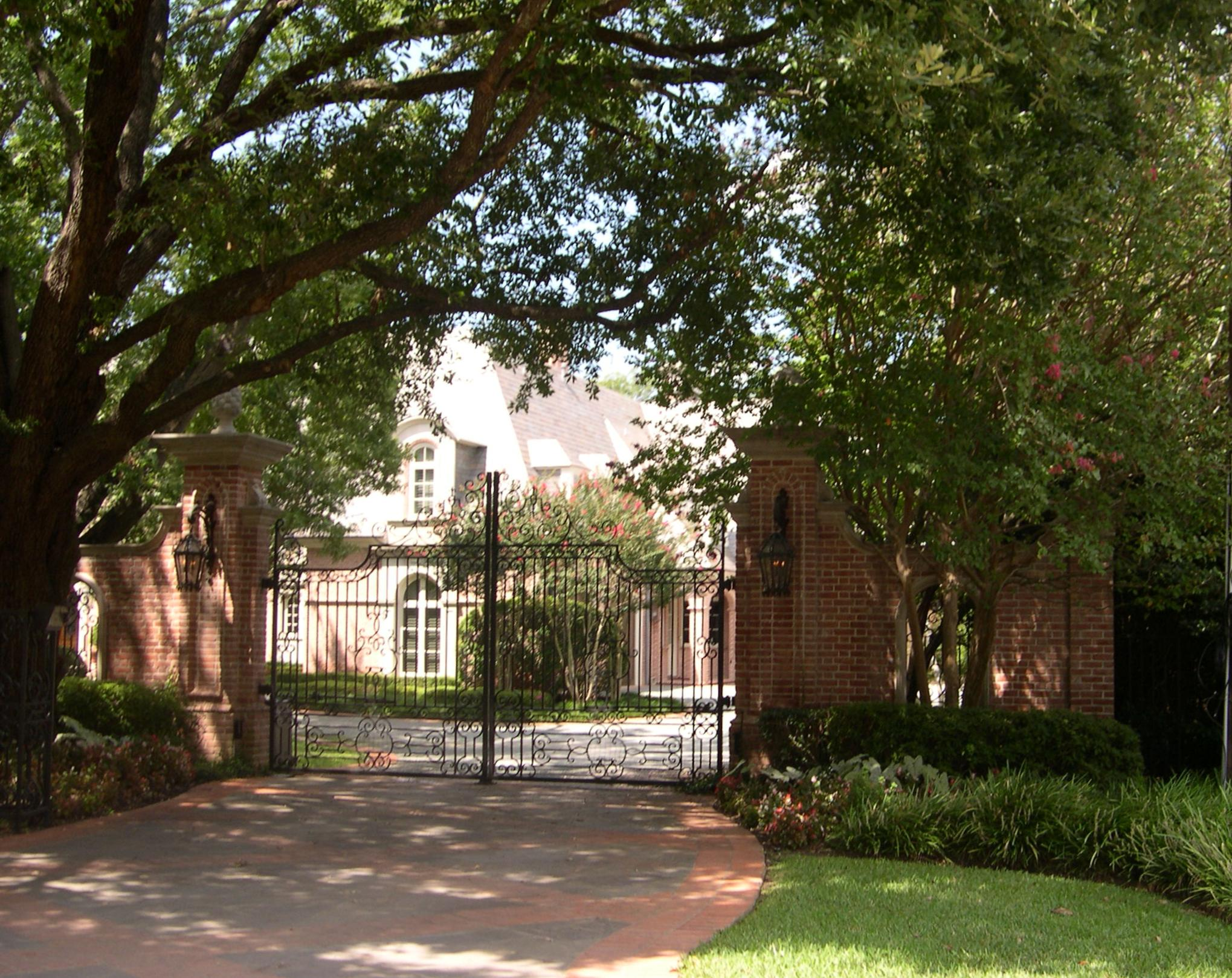
A house in Preston Hollow

== Cityscape ==
Preston Hollow is located 6 miles (9.7 km) north of Downtown Dallas. Preston Road is the main arterial road in the area. Terry Box of The Dallas Morning News said in 1987 that the corridor Preston Road travels through, between the Northwest Highway and the LBJ Freeway, is referred to as the "golden corridor" of Dallas due to its wealth.

Lisa Tanner of the Dallas Business Journal said, "The lines that define Preston Hollow are somewhat blurred." She said that Preston Hollow had been commonly defined as being bounded by the Northwest Highway to the south, Royal Lane to the north, and Hillcrest Road to the east. She noted that there were several "western measures." Mary Jacobs of The Dallas Morning News noted that area real estate agents usually define the boundaries of Preston Hollow as the Northwest Highway, Royal Lane, Hillcrest Road, and Midway Road. Roland Anderson, a resident, quoted by The Dallas Morning News, said that real estate agents use the name in the broadest manner possible because they believe the name has "panache." He added that, in the words of Jacobs, "Preston Hollow is really an amalgamation of neighborhoods."

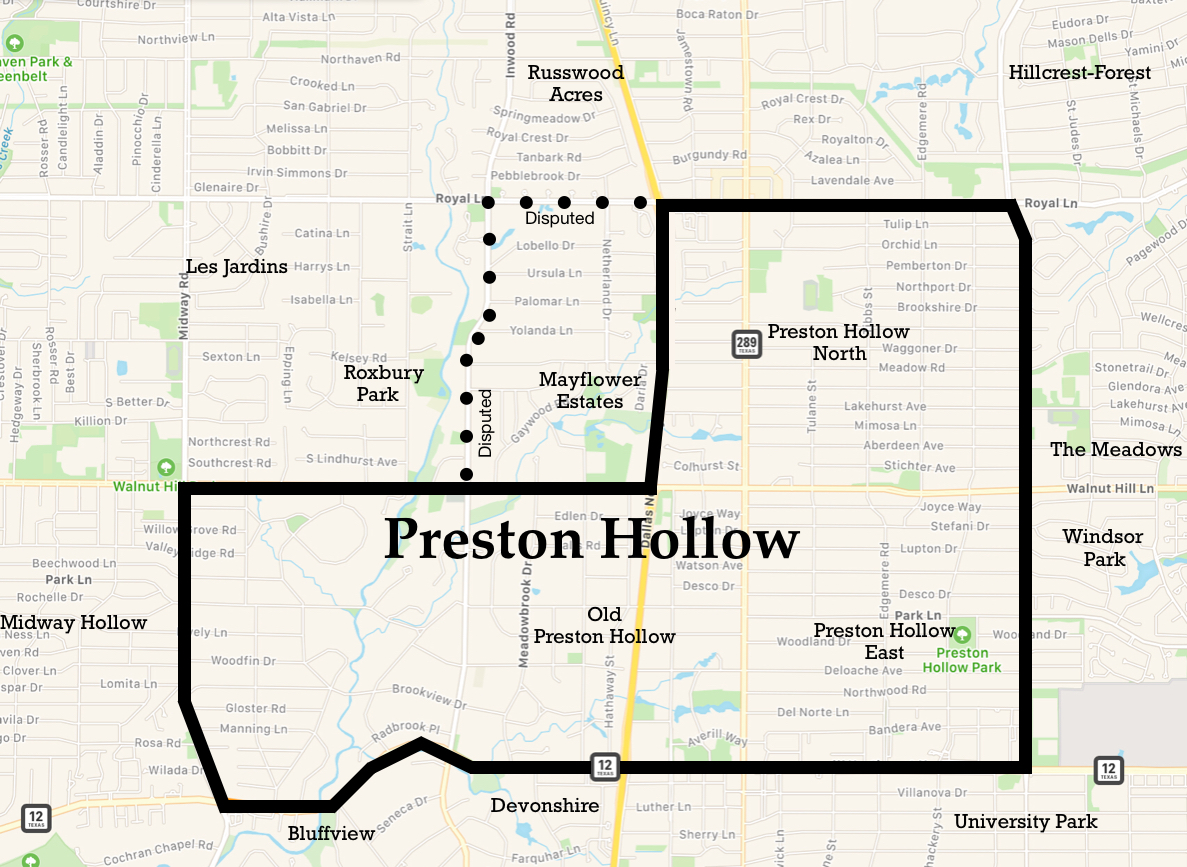
Preston Hollow‘s map from Preston Hollow: A Brief History

A map in the book Preston Hollow: A Brief History shows the boundaries, which were concluded by extensive research, as a backwards L shape with the Mayflower Estates area as “disputed”.

=== Areas within Preston Hollow ===
The area belonging to the former Preston Hollow town is now known as the "Estate area." The neighborhood is in western Preston Hollow. Tanner said that the estate area is east of Midway Road and west of Preston Road. Jacobs noted that the estate area is bounded by Preston Road, Walnut Hill Lane, Midway Road, and the Northwest Highway. She added that "The so-called estate area on Preston Hollow's western side boasts large lots with grand entrances, rolling hills, and winding streets, and is home to some of the most luxurious mansions in Dallas." Walnut Hill was the northern boundary of the former Preston Hollow municipality. Terry Box of The Dallas Morning News said in 1989 that the area north of Walnut Hill was "less prestigious" but "still affluent, with well-maintained upper-middle- and middle-class neighborhoods stretching to Royal Lane."

Nancy Moore of the Morning News said that the boundaries of eastern Preston Hollow were Northwest Highway, Royal Lane, Preston Road, and Hillcrest Road. Most of east Preston Hollow is under the jurisdiction of two homeowners associations: Preston Hollow East and Preston Hollow North. Eastern Preston Hollow is divided into several lots. The houses in eastern and northern Preston Hollow include some original two stories but mainly ranch houses from the 1930s, 1940s, or even 1950s and newer, larger houses. The more modern homes have 6,000 square feet (560 m^{2}) or more space. Kay Weeks, a realtor of Ebby Halliday Realtors and a resident of Preston Hollow, said that over 20 years until 2009, many former middle-class areas became wealthier. Since newer houses in Preston Hollow opened, the land value increased. Many 1-acre (0.40 ha) lots, as of 2009, were selling for $1 million ($1500698 in today's money) or more. Some such lots in popular locations had a value of $2 million each ($3001396 in today's money). The newer houses are larger single-family homes. Preston Hollow North's boundaries are Preston Road, Hillcrest Road, Royal Lane, and Walnut Hill Lane. Preston Hollow East consists of the single-family houses in an area bounded by the Dallas North Tollway, Hillcrest Road, Joyce Way, and Del Norte Lane.

== Government and infrastructure ==
Preston Hollow’s city hall, which was used until the town of Preston Hollow was annexed by Dallas in 1945, is now an office for Ebby Halliday Realtors.

The Dallas Fire Department operated Station #41, which opened on January 16, 1958, in Preston Hollow. The station was destroyed by the October 2019 tornado. Area residents and business owners refer to it as the "Preston-Royal Fire Department." Fire Station #27, which opened in 1948, is adjacent to Preston Hollow.

The United States Postal Service operates the Preston Post Office.

== Economy ==
Preston Center, a commercial area, is located close to Preston Hollow. The development includes two 20-story office towers that opened during a construction boom of the late 1970s and early 1980s. As of 1989, many of the Preston Center buildings were partially vacant. During that year, Terry Box of The Dallas Morning News said that the empty buildings were "viewed as intrusive symbols of the city's failure to control its growth" and "have come to exemplify much of what is wrong with North Dallas." Around that time, residents tried to pressure area politicians into making the development more low-rise and further removed from the Preston Hollow community.

The Dallas Galleria and the NorthPark Center are in proximity to Preston Hollow.

== Education ==
=== Public schools ===
Hillcrest High School

Dallas Independent School District (DISD) operates local public schools.

Elementary schools serving areas in Preston Hollow include John J. Pershing (in Mayflower Estates), Preston Hollow (in Preston Hollow North), Walnut Hill International Leadership Academy, and Harry C. Withers.

Residents zoned to Pershing and Preston Hollow are zoned to Benjamin Franklin Middle School and Hillcrest High School. Residents zoned to Walnut Hill are zoned to Medrano Junior High School and Thomas Jefferson High School. Residents zoned to Withers are zoned to E.D. Walker Middle School and W.T. White High School.

Withers has a Spanish-English dual-language program. As of 2013, this program has a waiting list, and the school has a lottery system. Walnut Hill School and Walker Middle also have Spanish-English dual-language programs.

==== Histories of schools ====
Walnut Hill School, later Walnut Hill Elementary School and now Walnut Hill International Leadership Academy, opened in the 1910s and moved to its current location in 1938. It was the first school to serve Preston Hollow kids. Hillcrest High School opened in 1938 and Preston Hollow Elementary opened in 1945-1946. Franklin and Pershing opened in the 1950s.

In the 2005–06 school year, three elementary schools, Pershing, Preston Hollow, and Walnut Hill served sections of the Preston Hollow area. Residents zoned to Preston Hollow and Pershing were zoned to Franklin Middle School and Hillcrest High School. Residents zoned to Walnut Hill were zoned to Cary Middle School and Thomas Jefferson High School. In Fall 2006, the attendance boundaries changed, with a portion of the former Walnut Hill zone being rezoned to Withers. The Withers section was rezoned from Cary and Thomas Jefferson to Walker Middle School and W.T. White High School.

In 2006, Preston Hollow Elementary School achieved notoriety after a lawsuit claiming the school's class-assignment policies violated the 1954 Supreme Court Brown v. Board of Education decision. Judge Sam Lindsay ruled in November that the school's practices were not legal because they attempted to keep white students together even if minority students had to be placed in inappropriate courses; this ruling was miscited in at least one local paper as indicating that "all-white" classes had been created.

Cary Middle was disestablished in 2020 after a 2019 tornado destroyed the campus, with Medrano and Franklin taking portions of the boundary.

=== Private schools ===
As of 2007, many Preston Hollow residents send their children to private schools.

The Roman Catholic Diocese of Dallas operates area Catholic schools. Ursuline Academy of Dallas, a Catholic girls' high school, is located in the Estate area of Preston Hollow. Non-Catholic private schools within Preston Hollow North include St. Mark's School of Texas (1–12) and Preston Hollow Presbyterian School (1–6).

Private Catholic schools in the surrounding area include Jesuit College Preparatory School of Dallas (Boys, 9–12), Christ the King Catholic School (K-8), St. Rita Catholic School (K-8) and St. Monica Catholic School (K-8). Other private schools in the surrounding area include Episcopal School of Dallas (PreK-12), Hockaday School (PreK-12, Girls), Parish Episcopal School (PreK-12), and Good Shepherd Episcopal School (PreK-8).

Three co-ed, nonsectarian private schools exist in Dallas that do not require uniforms, the Greenhill School (boys and girls k-12) in Addison, Lakehill Preparatory School in East Dallas, and Alcuin School all of which serve as an option for parents who want to send their children to schools not backed by a religious organization.

Nonsectarian co-ed private school Dallas International School Churchill Way Campus (TPS 2 year old-4th Grade) Waterview Campus (5th-12th Grade).

=== Colleges and universities ===
Preston Hollow is within the Dallas County Community College District.

Southern Methodist University is in proximity to Preston Hollow.

=== Public libraries ===
Dallas Public Library operates the Preston Royal Branch in the Preston Hollow area. It first opened in 1964. Its roof has arches above, and according to Andrew Scoggin of The Dallas Morning News, this makes the library appear distinct compared to others in the library system. As of 2013, there is no funding for a new library building intended to replace the current library.

== Parks and recreation ==
The City of Dallas operates two neighborhood parks, Netherland Park and Preston Hollow Park. The 7.2 acres (2.9 ha) Preston Hollow Park includes two baseball/softball fields, one soccer/football field, two tennis courts, one playground, seven picnic tables, and trails. The 5.3-acre (2.1 ha) Netherland Park includes two tennis courts and trails. Preston Hollow East and Preston Hollow North, two homeowners associations that cover most of eastern Preston Hollow, organize recreational activities such as book clubs and chess games.

== Media ==
The Dallas Morning News is the local citywide newspaper. The locally produced Preston Hollow newspaper is also distributed to residents of Preston Hollow.

A book, Preston Hollow: A Brief History, written by a Preston Hollow resident, covers the history of the neighborhood.
