= Charles Dilbeck =

American architect

Charles Stevens Dilbeck (1907–1990) was an American architect who worked primarily in Dallas, Texas.

== Early life ==
Dilbeck was born in Fort Smith, Arkansas, in 1907 and grew up working for his father's planing mill. At the age of 11, he designed and saw constructed a small church with a bell tower and Doric columns. He moved with his family to Tulsa at the age of 15, where he found work adapting standardized house plans for local builders.

== Career ==
Dilbeck attended Oklahoma A&M for two years before dropping out in 1929 to establish an architectural practice in Tulsa.

After his practice failed during the Great Depression, Dilbeck moved to Dallas with the intention to quit architecture for a more lucrative venture. After starting out selling a burglar alarm he had designed himself, Dilbeck briefly partnered with local architect George Marble before opening an office in the newly built Highland Park Village shopping center in 1932.

Dilbeck designed houses in the Dallas area until his retirement in 1969, particularly in the Highland Park, University Park, Preston Hollow, East Dallas, and Oak Cliff.

In addition to houses, Dilbeck designed a number of apartment buildings, hotels, shopping centers, and resorts.

Some of his notable commercial designs include the Belmont Hotel in West Dallas and the Red Bryan's Smokehouse (currently El Ranchito) on Jefferson Ave in Oak Cliff.

Dilbeck retired in 1969 and died on January 10, 1990.

== Legacy ==
Dilbeck once estimated that he had designed 400 houses during his career – approximately 130 residences designed by Dilbeck still existed in Dallas-Fort Worth as of 2018.

Dilbeck is remembered particularly for his romantic cottage houses, which drew from French, Irish, and Texan vernacular houses. Architectural critic David Dillon described an archetypal Dilbeck as "a ruggedly rustic composition of brick, stone, tile and wood, put together in surprising but often romantically appealing ways."

In 2022, the Charles Stevens Dilbeck Architecture Conservancy was established, dedicated to the preservation and promotion of his architectural legacy.

Dilbeck's original papers and blueprints were donated by his wife to the University of Texas.
