= Slaughter, Texas =

Ghost town in Texas, US

Slaughter was a ghost town in Midland County, Texas, United States.

== History ==
The town was founded in 1882. It was named after rancher Christopher Columbus Slaughter. The town had a post office from 1907 to 1912.
