= List of programs broadcast by Audience =

The following is a list of programs broadcast by the defunct Audience network, formerly known as Freeview and The 101 Network.

== Original programming ==
=== Drama ===
Title	Genre	Premiere	Seasons	Length	Status
Rogue	Police drama	April 3, 2013	4 seasons, 50 episodes	60 min.	Ended
Kingdom	Drama	October 8, 2014	3 seasons, 40 episodes	60 min.	Ended
Ice	Action	November 16, 2016	2 seasons, 20 episodes	60 min.	Ended
Mr. Mercedes	Mystery/Thriller	August 9, 2017	3 seasons, 30 episodes	49–57 min.	Ended
Condor	Thriller	June 6, 2018	2 seasons, 20 episodes	60 min.	Moved to Epix

=== Comedy ===
Title	Genre	Premiere	Seasons	Length	Status
Things You Shouldn't Say Past Midnight	Romance	October 14, 2014	1 season, 10 episodes	30 min.	Ended
Billy & Billie	Romance/Comedy drama	March 3, 2015	1 season, 10 episodes	30 min.	Ended
Almost There	Romance/Comedy drama	March 22, 2016	1 season, 10 episodes	30 min.	Ended
You Me Her	Romance/Comedy drama	March 22, 2016	4 seasons, 40 episodes	26–32 min.	Ended
Cassandra French's Finishing School	Comedy	February 17, 2017	1 season, 8 episodes	30 min.	Ended
Hit the Road	Comedy	October 17, 2017	1 season, 10 episodes	30 min.	Ended
Loudermilk	Comedy drama	October 17, 2017	3 seasons, 30 episodes	30 min.	Ended (Note: Audience only aired the first two seasons but produced and filmed a third which premiered on Amazon Prime in 2021.)

=== Anthology ===
Title	Genre	Premiere	Seasons	Length	Status
Full Circle	Comedy	October 9, 2013	3 seasons, 30 episodes	30 min.	Ended

=== Continuations ===
Title	Genre	Prev. network(s)	Premiere	Seasons	Length	Status
Passions	Soap opera	NBC	September 17, 2007	1 season, 199 episodes	43 min.	Ended
Friday Night Lights	Drama	NBC	October 1, 2008	3 seasons, 39 episodes	43 min.	Ended
Damages	Legal thriller	FX	July 13, 2011	2 seasons, 20 episodes	40–60 min.	Ended

=== Docuseries ===
Title	Genre	Premiere	Seasons	Length	Status
The Fighting Season	War	May 19, 2015	1 season, 6 episodes	60 min.	Ended
My Fighting Season	War	July 5, 2016	1 season, 6 episodes	60 min.	Ended
Religion of Sports	Sports	November 15, 2016	3 seasons, 18 episodes	60 min.	Ended
Refuge	Immigration	February 14, 2018	1 season, 6 episodes	30 min.	Ended
The Pitch	Sports	February 14, 2018	1 season, 6 episodes	30 min.	Ended

=== Documentaries ===
Title	Premiere	Length
The Sign	September 14, 2017	90 min.

=== Talk shows ===
Title	Genre	Premiere	Seasons	Length	Status
Undeniable with Dan Patrick	Sports	November 18, 2015	6 seasons, 60 episodes	52 min.	Ended
Fearless with Tim Ferriss	Self help	May 30, 2017	1 season, 10 episodes	50 min.	Ended

== Acquired programming ==
- 4th and Forever
- Abbey and Janice: Beauty and the Best
- Alaska State Troopers
- Alfred Hitchcock Presents
- American Gothic
- The Ancient Life
- Anthony Bourdain: No Reservations
- Antonio Treatment
- Backstory
- The Big C
- Biography
- The Borgias
- Boss
- Brotherhood
- Bullproof
- Californicaton
- Call Me Fitz
- Camelot
- Castle
- Coast Guard Alaska
- The Closer
- Crash
- The Dan Patrick Show
- Deadly 60
- Deadwood
- Diners, Drive-ins and Dives
- DogTown
- Dog Whisperer
- Fast Lane for Fun
- Friday the 13th: The Series
- From the Edge with Peter Lik
- General Hospital: Night Shift
- Ghost Adventures
- Greatest Tank Battles
- Head Case
- The Henry Rollins Show
- High Stakes Poker
- Hit & Miss
- Homeland
- How Not to Live Your Life
- Ice Road Truckers
- Iconoclasts
- Law & Order: Special Victims Unit
- Less Than Kind
- Locked Up Abroad
- Mad Men
- Magic City
- Major Crimes
- Man Caves
- Man v. Food
- Monster Fish
- Monsters
- The Moto: Inside the Outdoors
- Mutual Friends
- Night Gallery
- The Nine
- No Heroics
- Nurse Jackie
- Odyssey: Driving Around the World
- On Deck with Jamie and Mike
- Oz
- Party Down
- Perilous Journeys
- Phineas and Ferb
- Python Hunters
- Rake
- The Real Story
- The Rich Eisen Show
- Robin Hood
- Secret Diary of a Call Girl
- Selling New York
- The Shadow Line
- The Slap
- Sleeper Cell
- Smith
- Sons of Anarchy
- South Park
- Spartacus: Gods of the Arena
- Spartacus: Vengeance
- The Standard Snowboard Show
- Storm Surfers
- Tailgate Warriors
- Tales from the Crypt
- This American Life
- Throwdown! with Bobby Flay
- Top Gear
- Trailer Park Boys
- Triggers: Weapons That Changed the World
- Tracey Ullman's State of the Union
- True Blood
- The Tudors
- Twin Peaks
- Vanguard
- Ultimate Factories
- United States of Tara
- Underbelly
- Videos That Rocked the World
- Weeds
- The Whitest Kids U' Know
- The Wire
- Wonderland
- World's Toughest Fixes
- Z Rock
