= Solomon Luna =

American rancher and banker

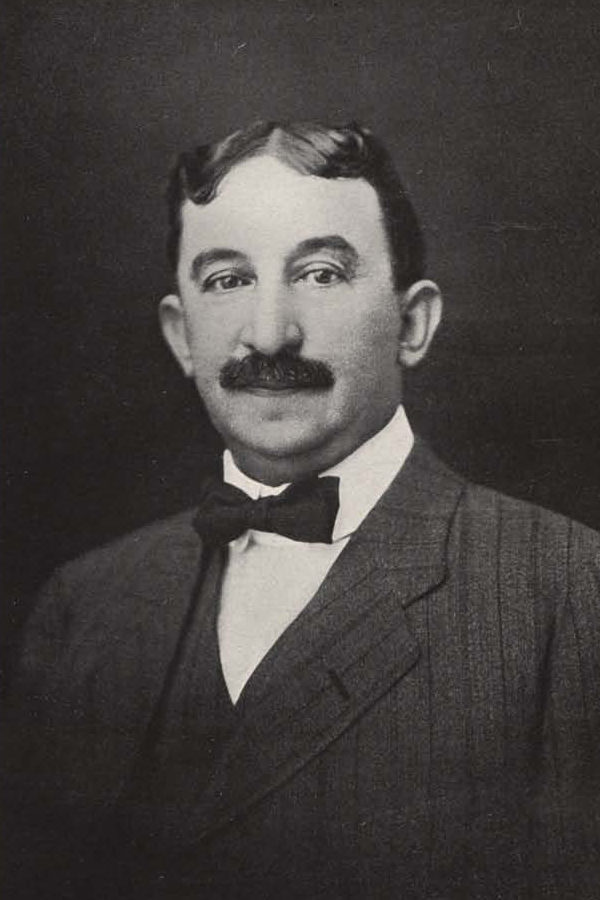
- Born: October 18, 1858; Los Lunas, New Mexico, U.S.
- Died: August 29, 1912 (aged 53); Bernalillo County, New Mexico, U.S.
- Resting place: Mount Calvary Cemetery (Albuquerque, New Mexico), U.S.
- Education: Saint Louis University
- Occupations: Rancher, banker
- Political party: Republican Party
- Children: 1

Solomon Luna (October 18, 1858 – August 29, 1912) was an American rancher and banker. He became one of the largest sheep owners in New Mexico. By the time of his death, "he was one of the wealthiest and most respected men in New Mexico."

== Early life ==
Luna was born on October 18, 1858, in Los Lunas, New Mexico. His father was Antonio Luna and his mother, Isabella.

Luna graduated from Saint Louis University.

== Career ==
Luna was a rancher in New Mexico. In the 1880s, he sued William B. Slaughter and his brother John Bunyan Slaughter over rangeland they had claimed; Luna won the lawsuit. Meanwhile, he "became the largest sheep owner in New Mexico."

Luna was the treasurer and tax collector of Valencia County from 1894 onwards. Luna was a delegate at the 1910 state constitutional convention. In 1911, when the New Mexico Territory became the state of New Mexico, Luna was elected in this same capacity. Additionally, Luna served as the president of Bank of Commerce in Albuquerque, New Mexico, from 1904 onwards.

== Personal life ==
Luna was married to Adelina Oero and had no children. His nephew, Maximiliano Luna, served in the Spanish–American War and the Philippine–American War. His son predeceased him. Luna was the uncle of suffragist Nina Otero-Warren.

Luna was a member of the Knights of Columbus and the Benevolent and Protective Order of Elks.

== Death and legacy ==
Luna died by drowning in a sheep vat on his ranch in Bernalillo County, New Mexico, on August 29, 1912, aged 53. He was buried at the Mount Calvary Cemetery in Albuquerque, New Mexico. By the time of his death, "he was one of the wealthiest and most respected men in New Mexico." Los Lunas High School, a high school in his hometown of Los Lunas, was named in his honor. In 1963, he was inducted into the Hall of Great Westerners of the National Cowboy & Western Heritage Museum. The settlement of Luna, New Mexico is named for him.
