= Ira P. DeLoache =

American real estate developer (1879–1965)

- Born: Ira Pleasant DeLoache; September 21, 1879; North Carolina, US
- Died: October 31, 1965 (aged 86); Dallas, Texas, U.S.
- Occupation: Real estate developer
- Spouse: Nelle Slaughter
- Children: Ira Averill DeLoache; James Ira DeLoache; Nelle Jourdan DeLoache
- Relatives: Christopher Columbus Slaughter; (father-in-law); Robert Lee Slaughter; (brother-in-law)

Ira Pleasant DeLoache (September 21, 1879 – October 31, 1965) was an American real estate developer. He was the founder of Whiteface, Texas. He was the main developer Preston Hollow, an affluent neighborhood in Dallas, Texas.

== Biography ==
DeLoache was born on September 21, 1879, on a plantation in North Carolina.

DeLoache moved to Dallas in 1909 and sold cigarettes there until 1915.

In 1922, DeLoache flew in an airplane over Dallas and decided to become a developer. He turned his father-in-law's ranch near Lubbock, Texas, into the new town of Whiteface, Texas, in 1924.

Two years later, in 1926, he opened a real estate development firm in Dallas. He began developing buildings in Downtown Dallas. Shortly after, he developed buildings along Knox Street in Highland Park, Texas.

De Loache became the main developer of Preston Hollow, an upper-middle-class neighborhood in Dallas. He purchased one hundred acres to start developing the area later to become known as Preston Hollow in 1930. He retired in 1960.

He died on October 31, 1965, in a retirement facility in Dallas, Texas. He was eighty-six years old.

== Family ==
DeLoache married Nelle Slaughter (May 24, 1892 – January 1, 1964), the daughter of Christopher Columbus Slaughter (February 9, 1837 – January 25, 1919), in 1913. They had three children, Ira Averill DeLoache (1917-1938), Nelle Jourdan DeLoache (1919-1975) and James Ira DeLoache (1923-2007). They resided on Preston Road in Preston Hollow, Dallas, Texas.
