= Soash, Texas =

Ghost town in Texas, US

- Ghost town
- Location in Texas
- Coordinates: 32.51147000°N 101.63890700°W
- Country: United States
- State: Texas
- County: Howard
- Established: 1909
- Extinct: c. 1919
- Founder: William P. Soash
- Named for: William P. Soash

Soash is a ghost town in Howard County, Texas, United States.

== Biography ==
Soash situated on a station of the Fort Worth and Denver Railway. It was founded in 1909 by William P. Soash after buying 110,000 acres of land from Christopher Columbus Slaughter. By 1910, the town had three buildings. There was a bank, built of bricks, a two-story hotel, named after Soash's daughter, and the post office. Rufus E. Slaughter was made the first postmaster on December 12, 1909. The land was unsuitable for farming, due to being situated near a caprock, and a severe drought from 1909 to 1912. By 1915, the town had a population of fifty. The post office was closed on June 30, 1916, reestablished in April 1917, then permanently closed on October 31, 1917. Another drought in 1918 and 1919 caused the remaining population to move to Lamesa, Texas.

== See also ==
- List of ghost towns in Texas
