= Lisa Blue Baron =

American lawyer (born 1952)

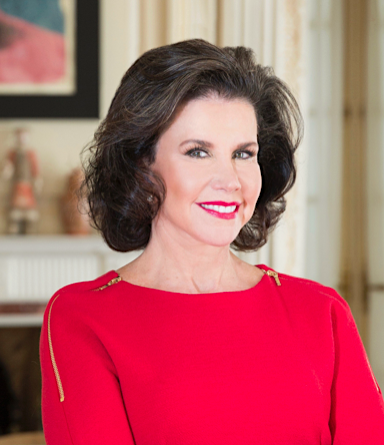
- Born: Lisa Blue; October 12, 1952 (age 73); Atlanta, Georgia, U.S.
- Education: University of Georgia (BA); University of Virginia (MA, EdS); South Texas College of Law (JD)
- Political party: Democratic
- Spouse: Fred Baron
- Website: Official website

Lisa Blue Baron is an American trial lawyer. Previously a psychologist, she worked in the field for nearly a decade before becoming a jury consultant and graduating from law school. She then became an assistant district attorney in Dallas County, Texas before joining the Baron & Budd law firm. Following her time with Baron & Budd, she started her own firm, Baron and Blue, and was elected president of the American Association for Justice in 2014. Blue is also a fundraiser for the Democratic Party and a philanthropist through the Baron and Blue Foundation.

== Early life and education ==
Baron was born in 1952 and raised in Atlanta, Georgia. Her father worked as a surgeon, her mother was a homemaker, and she had three brothers. In 1973, she received a bachelor's in psychology from the University of Georgia before studying at the University of Virginia, earning a master's degree in counseling psychology and a post-master's Education Specialist (Ed.S.).

== Career ==
Starting her career as a teacher and counseling psychologist at a psychiatric hospital in Houston, Baron worked as a forensic psychologist and jury consultant. She then attended the South Texas College of Law, graduating with her Juris Doctor in 1980. Her legal career began with a position as an assistant district attorney in the Dallas County District Attorney's office, where she prosecuted more than 125 criminal trials to verdict and later advanced to the Organized Crime Division.

She began specializing in environmental and toxic tort law in 1986 when she joined her husband, Fred Baron, at his law firm Baron & Budd, the largest environmental law firm in the United States. While at Baron & Budd 2001, she won her largest verdict to date, $55.5 million, in the El Paso asbestos case Hernandez v. Kelly-Moore Paints. After selling their interest in the firm in 2002, Baron continues to work in the legal field with her firm, Baron and Blue, and maintains a private consultancy in jury selection and forensic psychology.

In 2012, she was elected vice-president of the American Association for Justice and began her leadership of the organization in 2014 when she moved to Washington D.C. She became a top fundraiser for Hillary Clinton's 2016 Presidential Campaign, hosting events at her Dallas estate in Preston Hollow. Baron is also a Democratic Party fundraiser for local and state elections.

In 2001, she was named one of the top fifty female litigators in the United States by the National Law Journal, and later as one of its "Top 100 Most Influential Lawyers in America." In 2015, she was inducted into the U.S. Trial Lawyers Hall of Fame.

Baron has co-authored numerous articles on jury selection as well as four books. One of the most well-known names in jury selection in Texas and across the United States, The American Association for Justice notes that Blue's 2004 book, Blue's Guide to Jury Selection, is "considered the 'bible' of jury selection."

== Personal life ==
She was married to attorney Fred Baron from 1980 until his death from cancer in 2008. She is the mother of three children and two stepchildren. As a philanthropist, Baron runs the Baron and Blue Foundation through which she raises money for causes, including those that combat homelessness.
