= Clarence Scharbauer Jr. =

American rancher, oilman, banker, and horse breeder

- Born: July 6, 1925; Midland, Texas, U.S.
- Died: February 21, 2014 (aged 88); Midland, Texas, U.S.
- Education: Texas A&M University (did not graduate)
- Occupations: Rancher, oilman, banker, horsebreeder
- Spouse: Dorothy Turner
- Children: 3 sons, 1 daughter
- Parent(s): Clarence Scharbauer; Ruth Cowden
- Relatives: John Scharbauer (paternal great-uncle)

Clarence Scharbauer Jr. (July 6, 1925 – February 21, 2014) was an American rancher, oilman, banker, horse breeder and philanthropist. He was inducted into the American Quarter Horse Hall of Fame and the Horse Racing Hall of Fame.

== Early life ==
Clarence Scharbauer Jr. was born on July 6, 1925, in Midland, Texas. His father, Clarence Scharbauer Sr., was a rancher. His paternal great-uncle was a large rancher from New York. His paternal great-great-grandfather was an immigrant from Germany.

Scharbauer attended Texas A&M University for one semester, until he dropped out in 1942 when his father was diagnosed with cancer. During World War II, he served in the United States Navy.

== Career ==
Scharbauer inherited his father's 350,000-acre ranches, including Valor Farm in Pilot Point, Texas, which cumulatively has "produced more than one billion barrels of oil", and oil investments. He was the recipient of the Golden Spur award for ranching.

Scharbauer served as the chairman of the First National Bank of Midland, but the bank failed.

Scharbauer was a horse breeder. He was the owner of the Kentucky Derby winner Alysheba. Another horse he owned, Fiftyshadesofgold, won the Texas Stallion Stakes at the Sam Houston Race Park on February 15, 2014. He was inducted into the American Quarter Horse Hall of Fame and the Horse Racing Hall of Fame. He was the recipient of the lifetime achievement award from the Texas Thoroughbred Association in 2007.

== Philanthropy ==
Scharbauer made charitable contributions to Midland College (where the Scharbauer Student Center is named in his honor) and the Midland Memorial Hospital (where the Dorothy and Clarence Scharbauer Jr. Patient Tower is named after he and his wife). Additionally, the Scharbauer Sports Complex was named after him after another donation he made. Scharbauer was also the founder of the Scharbauer Foundation, a philanthropic foundation.

== Personal life ==
Scharbauer married to Dorothy Turner, whose father, Fred Turner Jr., won the 1959 Kentucky Derby with a horse named Tomy Lee. The couple had four children: sons Clarence Scharbauer III, Douglas, and Chris, and daughter Pamela. He was widowed in 2005.

== Death and legacy ==
Scharbauer died on February 21, 2014, of complications following emergency surgery. He was eighty-eight years old.

Scharbauer's children are active in business and politics. Clarence Scharbauer III, serves as the Chairman of the Board of Trustees of Texas Christian University as of 2018–2019. Douglas Scharbauer continues to race horses and purchase mineral rights. In the 2018 election cycle, he was the top donor to Texas Attorney General Ken Paxton.
