= William B. Slaughter (rancher) =

American rancher, cattle driver, banker and county judge (1852–1929)

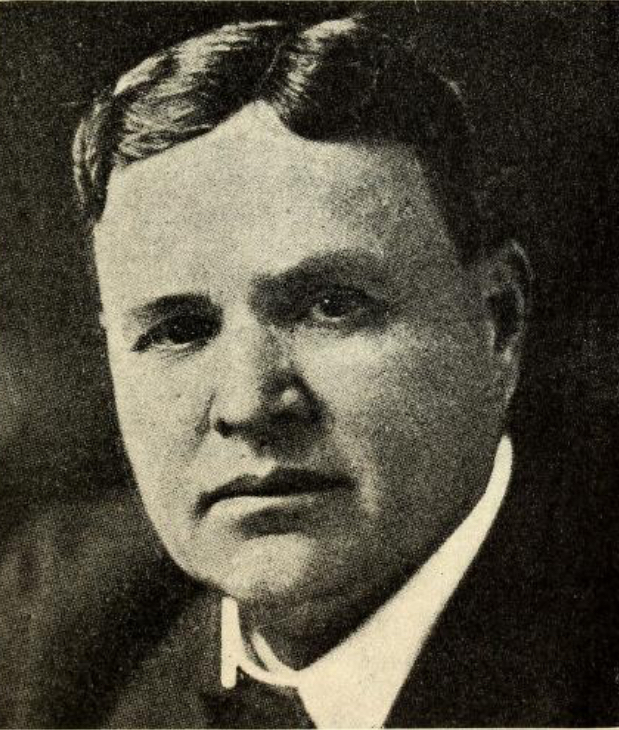
- Slaughter in a 1925 publication
- Born: William Baxter Slaughter; 1852; Freestone County, Texas, U.S.
- Died: March 28, 1929 (aged 76–77); San Antonio, Texas, U.S.
- Resting place: Palo Pinto, Texas, U.S.
- Occupations: Rancher, banker, county judge
- Spouse: Anna McAdams
- Children: Coney C. Slaughter
- Parent(s): George Webb Slaughter; Sarah Mason
- Relatives: Christopher Columbus Slaughter (brother); John Bunyan Slaughter (brother); Robert Lee Slaughter (nephew)

William Baxter Slaughter (1852 – March 28, 1929) was an American rancher, cattleman, banker and county judge. Born into a ranching family, he drove cattle and ranched in New Mexico before acquired a ranch in Sherman County, Texas. He founded local banks in Texas and New Mexico, and he was tried but acquitted on suspicion of faulty loans. He retired in San Antonio, Texas.

== Early life ==
Slaughter was born in 1852, in Freestone County, Texas. His father, George Webb Slaughter, was a Baptist minister from Mississippi and early rancher in Texas. His mother was Sarah Mason. His brother Christopher became known as the "Cattle King of Texas". Another brother, John Bunyan Slaughter, was also a large rancher.

Slaughter grew up in Palo Pinto County, Texas. During the American Civil War, he helped his father provide beef from their ranch to the Tonkawa, a Native American tribe who were aligned with the Confederate States Army.

== Career ==
Slaughter went on a cattle drive to Jefferson, Texas, with his brother Christopher in 1867. Two years later, in 1869, he drove cattle on the Chisholm Trail with another brother, Peter. The two men drove cattle all the way to Abilene, Kansas. In 1870, he drove 1,600 head of cattle to Kansas City, Kansas. On his way in Red Fork, Oklahoma, Slaughter and his retinue encountered members of the Osage Nation, but they quickly became friendly.

In 1877, Slaughter invested in steers with his brother John. The two brothers drove the cattle to Kansas, where they sold it annually. Later, they moved to a ranch near McDonald Creek in Crosby County, Texas. They sold it in 1883, and William moved to a ranch in Sierra County, New Mexico. (Meanwhile, his brother John moved to a ranch in Socorro County, New Mexico.) However, they did not own the land and a shootout occurred between the Slaughters's cowboys and cowboys hired by Solomon Luna, another rancher, on October 30–31, 1884. William was wounded in the fight. When Luna sued the brothers, he won the lawsuit. Meanwhile, William ranched in New Mexico and drove cattle to Nebraska and Wyoming annually until 1894. He was associated with the American Valley Cattle Company of New Mexico in 1895.

Meanwhile, in 1889, Slaughter began acquiring rangeland in Sherman County, Texas. The town of Coldwater, which served as the county seat of Sherman County from 1889 to 1891, was on his ranch. Later, they moved the county seat to Stratford, Texas, which was named after Stratford Hall, Confederate General Robert E. Lee's family plantation.

Slaughter lost his election run for Sherman County judge to Dudley Hiram Snyder in 1900.

By 1905, Slaughter moved to Dalhart, Texas, and opened a bank. Later, he opened another bank in Texline, Texas. In 1914, he co-founded the Bankers' Trust Company, a US$5-million bank, with his brother C.C. Meanwhile, he served as the president of the Mercantile National Bank of Pueblo. In 1916, he was sued by 30 customers over faulty loans. Slaughter was acquitted, but his brother C.C. acquired most of his cattle and ranches, and paid back his debtors.

== Personal life and death ==
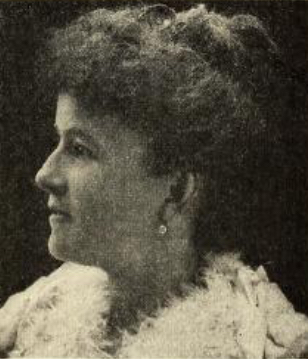
Anna McAdams in a 1925 publication

Slaughter married Anna McAdams in 1877. They had a son, Coney C. Slaughter, born in 1878. Slaughter was a Baptist. He invited Baptist preachers George Washington Truett and James Bruton Gambrell to speak to the cowboys on his ranches. Slaughter retired in Dallas, before moving to San Antonio, where he was an active member of the Trail Drivers Association.

Slaughter died on March 28, 1929, aged 76 or 77, in San Antonio. He was buried in Palo Pinto, Texas. His son was jailed for embezzlement at the Leavenworth Penitentiary until 1930, and he committed suicide in 1932.
