= Bledsoe Independent School District =

Defunct School district in Texas

Bledsoe Independent School District was a public school district based in western Cochran County, Texas, 75 miles east of Lubbock, at the border with New Mexico. It consolidated with the Whiteface Independent School District to form Whiteface Consolidated Independent School District.

In 1996, the district was rated as "Exemplary" by the Texas Education Agency (TEA).

== History ==
In 1956, it voted to consolidate with the Sligo Independent School District.

Bledsoe ISD was the sole proprietor of Bledsoe Natural Gas, which was indirectly supplied by El Paso Natural Gas and served 66 customers in Cochran County in 1976.

It had an enrollment of 65 in 1985, decreasing to 32 by 1993.

=== Closing ===
The 1993 state-implemented Robin Hood plan scheme compelled districts to distribute wealth. Like other property-rich West Texas districts, it found itself with a low enrollment and high tax valuation. That same year, it approved the Robin Hood plan and sent approximately $30,000 to the state.

State senator Teel Bivins pointed out lawmakers underestimated the impact of the Robin Hood plan legislation on smaller Texas school districts, though decreasing enrollment was also a factor.

Its enrollment totaled 38 by the end of the 1995–1996 school year. It served 21 students from kindergarten to the sixth grade while 17 students grades 7 to 12 attended Whiteface ISD schools beginning in 1989.

The consolidation meant that the newly expanded Whiteface would be considered less a wealthy school district due to a more diluted tax base.

Enrollment at Bledsoe ISD peaked before World War 2, at 220 students with 20 classroom teachers. This was at a time when railroads and cattle transportation through them were active. In 1995, two families with a combined 16 children left, impacting enrollment at the local Bledoes school. In August 1995, Bledsoe voters voted to consolidate with Whiteface. Voters in Whiteface approved the merger.

By the time of its closing, the district was sending approximately 40% of its tax revenue to the state.

The consolidation of the Bledsoe and Whiteface school districts occurred on July 1, 1996.
