= John Scharbauer =

- Born: December 28, 1852; Albany County, New York, U.S.
- Died: October 20, 1941 (aged 88); Fort Worth, Texas, U.S.
- Resting place: Greenwood Memorial Park, Fort Worth, Texas, U.S.
- Occupation: Rancher
- Spouse: Kate Tompkins
- Relatives: Clarence Scharbauer (nephew); Clarence Scharbauer, Jr. (great-nephew)

John Scharbauer (December 28, 1852 – October 20, 1941) was an American rancher. Born in New York, he moved to Texas in 1880 and became a large rancher in the Southwest. By the time of his death, his business empire included "operations in banking, corporate investments, oil lands, real estate and ranches which sprawled across four Texas counties and into New Mexico."

== Early life ==
Scharbauer was born on December 28, 1852, in Albany County, New York. His father was an immigrant from Germany.

Scharbauer moved to Texas in 1880, at the age of twenty-eight, with US$2,000. He first worked as a restaurant dishwasher in Eastland, Texas, to "get acquainted" with the local residents. Scharbauer had stopped at Eastland because that was the last stop on the railroad.

== Career ==
Scharbauer purchased 450 sheep with his US$2,000 and raised them near Sweetwater, Texas. By 1882, he moved to Abilene, Texas, where he worked with another investor. However, two years later, in 1884, his business partner bailed out and Scharbauer moved his sheep to Mitchell County, Texas. In 1885, he purchased the Mallet Cattle Company with David M. DeVitt and registered the brand in Hockley County, Texas; it later became known as the Mallet Ranch.

Meanwhile, in 1887, Scharbauer purchased a ranch near Midland, Texas, in present-day Stanton, Texas. Within a year, by 1888, he was able to ship between 48,000 and 49,000 sheep to the markets in Chicago. Two years later, in 1890, he was the first rancher to raise Hereford cattle in West Texas. The first cattle came from Illinois. He also raised Texas Longhorn, which were driven to Amarillo, Texas, and subsequently shipped to Montana and Wyoming. By 1892-1893, due to the winding down of open range, Scharbauer sold his sheep and refocused his investments on cattle. Over the years, his cattle won many blue ribbon competitions. Eventually, Scharbauer founded the Scharbauer Cattle Company, headquartered in Fort Worth, Texas. Scharbauer also conducted business out of Midland, Texas, and Hobbs, New Mexico. By 1939, Scharbauer had reinvested in sheep, and he owned 10,000 sheep and 15,000 cattle.

Scharbauer co-founded a precursor to the First National Bank of Midland, Texas, with the Connelle brothers in 1890. He served on its board of directors during the Great Depression, when he borrowed US$100,000 from a bank in Fort Worth to save the Midland bank.

By the time of his death, his business empire included "operations in banking, corporate investments, oil lands, real estate and ranches which sprawled across four Texas counties and into New Mexico," namely Martin County, Midland County, Gaines County and Andrews County, as well as Lea County, New Mexico.

== Personal life ==
Scharbauer married Kate Tompkins. They resided in Fort Worth, Texas. They had a daughter, Eusebia, who married William C. Stonestreet. Scharbauer was widowed in 1935.

== Death and legacy ==
Scharbauer died of a heart attack on October 20, 1941, in Fort Worth, Texas. He was eighty-nine years old. He was buried at the Greenwood Memorial Park in Fort Worth, Texas.

Scharbauer's ranch in Lea County, New Mexico was purchased by rancher Millard Eidson in 1942. The sale was arranged prior to Scharbauer's death. Meanwhile, his nephew, Clarence Scharbauer, who served as the vice president of the Scharbauer Cattle Company during his lifetime, succeeded him as president.
