= Clarence Scharbauer =

American rancher, oilman, banker and hotelier

- Born: August 18, 1879; Albany County, New York, U.S.
- Died: October 2, 1942 (aged 63)
- Resting place: Fairview Cemetery
- Education: Baylor University
- Occupations: Rancher, oilman, banker, hotelier
- Spouse: Ruth Cowden
- Children: 2 sons
- Relatives: John Scharbauer (paternal uncle)

Clarence Scharbauer (August 17, 1879 – October 2, 1942) was an American rancher, oilman, banker and hotelier. He was the owner of large ranches in Texas and New Mexico. By the time of his death, Scharbauer was "one of West Texas' most prominent and influential citizens."

== Early life ==
Clarence Scharbauer was born on August 18, 1879, in Albany County, New York. He grew up in Midland, Texas. His paternal uncle, John Scharbauer, was a Texas cattleman who owned ranches in Lea County, New Mexico. His paternal great-grandfather was an immigrant from Germany.

Scharbauer attended a business school in Waco, Texas, followed by Baylor University.

== Career ==
Scharbauer managed and eventually inherited the family ranches. His ranches "spread into five West Texas and two New Mexico counties." One ranch was in Pecos County, Texas. In 1935, oil was discovered on his ranches. When his uncle's ranches in Lea County, New Mexico were purchased by Millard Eidson of Lovington, New Mexico, in 1942, Scharbauer succeeded his uncle as the president of the Scharbauer Cattle Company.

Scharbauer joined the Board of Directors of the First National Bank of Midland in 1923. He served as its vice president from 1925 to 1927, and as its president from 1927 until his death.

Scharbauer built the Scharbauer Hotel, a 250-room hotel in Midland, Texas, in 1928. It opened in 1928, and it became the center of business and social life in Midland. Additionally, he served as the president of the Midland Fair, which organized rodeos in Midland. He was also the owner of a local radio station, KRLH.

In the wake of World War II, Scharbauer donated 450 acres to expand the Midland International Air and Space Port.

== Personal life ==
Scharbauer married Ruth Cowden. They had two sons, including Clarence Scharbauer, Jr., a horsebreeder. They resided in a house at 602 South Main Street, until they moved into a penthouse in the Scharbauer Hotel in Midland, Texas.

== Death and legacy ==
Scharbauer died of cancer on October 2, 1942. His funeral, which took place at the First Baptist Church in Midland on October 4, was held by Dr. William R. White, the President of Hardin–Simmons University. He was buried at the Fairview Cemetery in Midland, Texas. By the time of his death, Scharbauer was "one of West Texas' most prominent and influential citizens."

His will bequeathed US$25,000 to build the new First Baptist Church in Midland, Texas. The rest of his estate went to his widow, his son, and a cousin, Arnold Scharbauer. His son, Clarence Scharbauer, Jr., was a philanthropist and inductee into the American Quarter Horse Hall of Fame and the Horse Racing Hall of Fame.

The Scharbauer Hotel in Midland, Texas was demolished in 1973.
