= The Standard Snowboard Show =

- Genre: Extreme Sports
- Country of origin: United States

Original release
- Release: November 25, 2003 – present

The Standard Snowboard Show is an American sports documentary television series airing on the Big Ten Network, Fox Sports Net, and various other members of the Fox Cable Networks. It is filmed at numerous snowboarding sites worldwide, including Canada and New Zealand.

Each episode explores a different location, highlighting its challenges and features where big mountain snowboarders ride avalanche-prone descents. The show's regular format matches a score with cinematography mixes profiles and feature segments, all focusing on the world of freestyle and big mountain snowboarding.
