= George Webb Slaughter =

American Baptist minister (1811–1895)

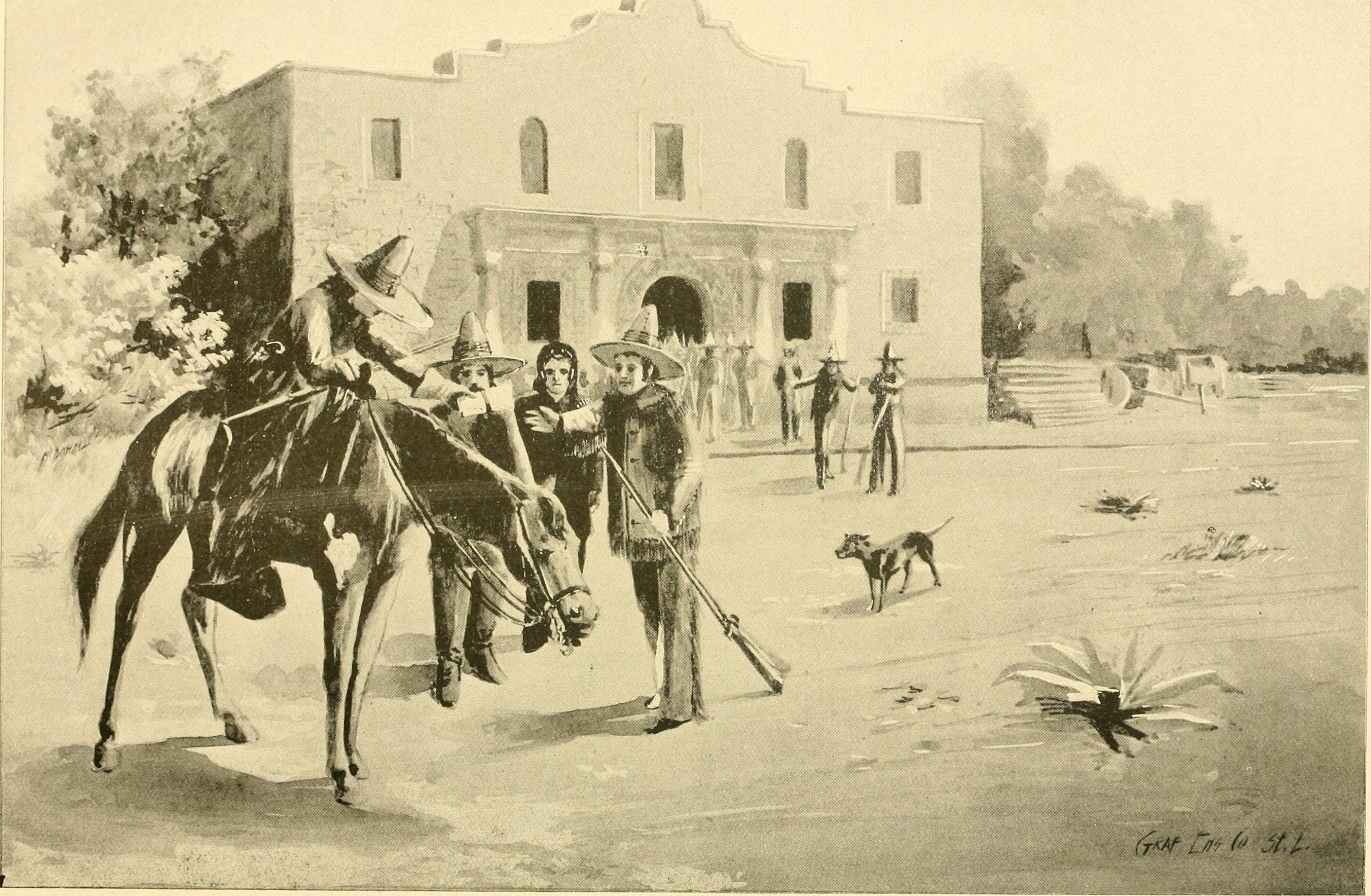
- Illustration of Slaughter's message to Travis, Bowie, and Crockett
- Born: May 10, 1811; Lawrence County, Mississippi, U.S.
- Died: March 19, 1895 (aged 83); Palo Pinto, Texas, U.S.
- Occupation(s): Rancher, cattle breeder, cattle drover, clergyman, physician
- Title: Reverend
- Spouse: Sarah Jane (Mason) Slaughter
- Children: 11, including C.C. Slaughter and William B. Slaughter
- Parent(s): William Slaughter; Nancy Moore

George Webb Slaughter (1811–1895) was an American Baptist minister, cattle breeder and drover, and rancher in Texas. Born in Mississippi, he drove cattle to Kansas and Louisiana, from his ranch near Palo Pinto, Texas. According to historian J. Marvin Hunter, "he baptized over 3,000 persons and ordained more preachers and organized more churches than any other person in the state of Texas."

== Early life ==
George Webb Slaughter was born on May 10, 1811, in Lawrence County, Mississippi. His father, William Slaughter (1781-1851), was a farmer who had served in the War of 1812; and his mother was Nancy Moore. With his parents, he moved Copiah County, Mississippi, in 1821, to Louisiana in 1825, and to Sabine County, Texas, five years later, in 1830.

== Career ==
Slaughter was a courier to Sam Houston. In this capacity, he delivered a message from Houston to William B. Travis at the Battle of the Alamo in 1836.

Slaughter joined the United Methodist Church in 1831. However, ten years later, he joined the Baptist Church, becoming an ordained Baptist minister in 1844. He served as a Baptist minister in Sabine County and other parts of East Texas until 1851. He then moved with his family and cattle to Freestone County, Texas. Six years later, in 1857, he established a ranch near Palo Pinto, Texas. There, he also served as a Baptist minister and practised medicine. According to historian J. Marvin Hunter, "he baptized over 3,000 persons and ordained more preachers and organized more churches than any other person in the state of Texas."

During the American Civil War of 1861-1865, Slaughter provided beef from his ranch to the Tonkawa, a Native American tribe who were aligned with the Confederate States Army.

After the war, Slaughter focused on cattle breeding and droving. With his son C.C. Slaughter, he drove cattle from Palo Pinto, Texas to Shreveport, Louisiana, in 1867. The herd was meant for T. H. Johnson. He also sold cattle to James Loving (1836-1902) and Charles Rivers in 1867-1868. In 1870, he drove 3,000 heads of cattle on the Chisholm Trail all the way to Kansas with his son. Living in Emporia, Kansas, from 1870 to 1876, he drove cattle every year.

From 1876 to 1884, Slaughter returned to Texas, where he focused on ranching with another son, Peter Slaughter.

== Personal life ==
Slaughter married Sarah Jane Mason on October 12, 1837. They were the first couple to get married in the Republic of Texas. They had eleven children.

== Death ==
Slaughter died on March 19, 1895, in Palo Pinto, Texas.
