= William P. Soash =

American land developer (1877–1961)

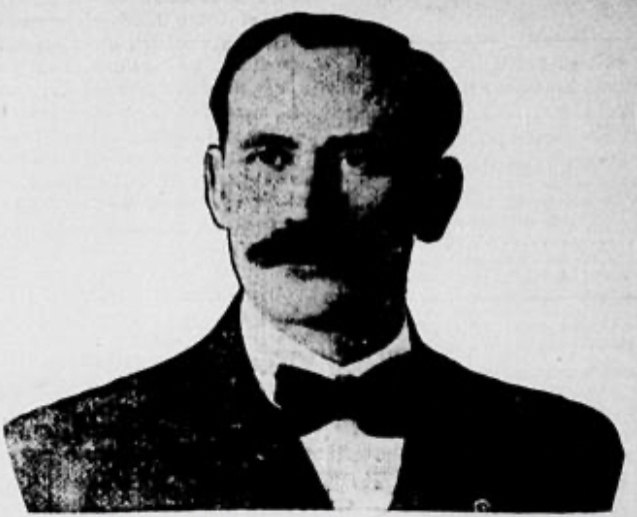
- Soash in a 1911 publication
- Born: William Pulver Soash; September 5, 1877; Butler County, Iowa, US
- Died: July 1, 1961 (aged 83)
- Occupation: Land developer

William Pulver Soash (September 5, 1877 – July 10, 1961) was an American land developer.

== Biography ==
Soash was born on September 5, 1877, in Butler County, Iowa, to George Soash and Poly Hiserodt. His mother died in 1883 and his father died in 1891. He worked as a carpenter and later as a US Marshal. He married Minnie Haase in 1900, having 2 children. After 1900, Soash helped develop The Dakotas for the John Lund Land Company.

In 1905, he founded the W. P. Soash Land Company. The next year, the company bought 30,000 acres of land from the Capitol Freehold Land and Investment Company; they used the land to establish Ware, Texas. In 1909, the company bought 110,000 acres of land from Christopher Columbus Slaughter; he used this land to establish Soash, Texas. The company closed in 1912, following a 3-year drought. In 1918, Soash served in the Texas Cavalry during World War I as a second lieutenant. In 1924, he and his family founded the Lone Star Land Company and moved to Lubbock. He died on July 10, 1961.
