= Fred Baron (lawyer) =

American lawyer

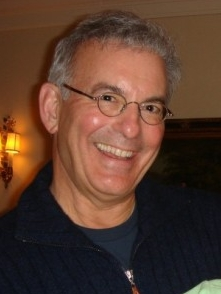
- Fred Baron in 2008
- Born: Frederick Martin Baron; June 20, 1947; Cedar Rapids, Iowa, U.S.
- Died: October 30, 2008 (aged 61); Dallas, Texas, U.S.
- Education: University of Texas at Austin (BA, JD)
- Spouse: Lisa Blue Baron

Frederick Martin "Fred" Baron (June 20, 1947 – October 30, 2008) was an American trial lawyer best known for representing plaintiffs claiming toxic and chemical exposure. He was also an active figure in politics as a fund-raiser for the Democratic Party.

== Early life and education ==
Born in Cedar Rapids, Iowa, Fred spent his early years in Rock Island, Illinois until Baron and his mother moved to Smithville, Texas when he was fifteen. A high school football player, he continued his education at the University of Texas at Austin. Then he attended the University of Texas School of Law, where he was an editor of the law review.

== Career ==
Baron was one of the founders of Baron & Budd, P.C., a Dallas, Texas law firm and a former president of the Association of Trial Lawyers of America. Fred Baron sold his interest in Baron & Budd and retired from the firm in December 2002. His former firm has become one of the largest firms in the country representing victims of toxic and chemical exposure particularly claims of asbestos exposure. As a young lawyer in 1975, Baron became a pioneer in the application of strict liability causes of action in asbestos litigation using the then-recently adopted Restatement Second of Torts Section 402a. He represented workers and widows of deceased workers at Pittsburg Corning's Tyler, Texas plant.

One academic estimated that Baron & Budd, along with Ness Motley, was one of two firms responsible for half of the hundreds of thousands of asbestos litigation claimants in the country.

Baron convinced the United States Supreme Court to de-certify nationwide asbestos class action settlements involving future claims of people who are not yet ill, but who may later develop asbestos-related illnesses. The decertification addressed the problem that asbestos-related illnesses like pleural mesothelioma (a fatal cancer of the lining of the lung) or peritoneal mesothelioma (a similar cancer of the lining of the abdomen), have a latency period of 20–40 years from the date of exposure.

In 1985, Baron reached a $20 million (some argue $45 million after payments with interest are included over a 30-year period) agreement with RSR Corporation for one of the largest community lead contamination cases ever. In the mainly impoverished and minority community of West Dallas, he represented 370 children and some 40 property owners. Most clients resided in the West Dallas public housing complex that was located directly in the path of the prevailing southerly winds that had blown lead particles released in the air by RSR Corp. into the lives of the children in the neighborhood. The case did not however make it all the way through the court systems. The actual agreement came in an out-of-court settlement with Baron and RSR Corp. The children benefiting from Barons work receive interest included periodical payments over a 30-year period. In 2002, Baron left Baron & Budd along with his wife, Lisa Blue. Baron sued his former firm for breach of contract; Baron & Budd counterclaimed alleging that Baron and Blue breached contractual, fiduciary and legal obligations to the firm by failing to receive prior consent from Baron & Budd for plans to form a new firm.

=== Politics ===
Baron was an active figure in politics as a prominent fund-raiser for the Democratic Party and fellow trial lawyer, Sen. John Edwards. Baron was the finance chair of Edwards's 2004 presidential campaign before co-chairing the Kerry Victory '04 committee, a joint effort of the Democratic National Committee and the John Kerry 2004 presidential campaign. Baron gave $1.7 million to the Texas Democratic Trust in the last two years and was also heavily involved in John Edwards 2008 presidential campaign, moving to North Carolina to coordinate fundraising, and renting Edwards his Hawker 800 private jet. In total, the Edwards campaign paid Baron nearly 1.1 million dollars for this service.

Baron joked about the prominence he and other trial lawyers have in the Democratic Party. In a July 2002 speech, he noted a Wall Street Journal editorial that said that "the plaintiffs bar is all but running the Senate." Baron pointed to the editorial and said, "Now I really, strongly disagree with that. Particularly the 'all but.'"

== Personal life ==
Baron indicated on August 8, 2008, two months before his death at age 61, that he had provided financial assistance to John Edwards' mistress, Rielle Hunter. He claims he paid her directly, not using campaign money. Baron died of cancer in Dallas on October 30, 2008.

== Awards and honors ==
- Fred Baron has been honored as a lawyer who helped shape Texas law during the 20th century in Legal Legends: A Century of Texas Law and Lawyering.
- Named as one of the nation's top plaintiff's lawyers by Forbes magazine (2001).
- In 2001, The University of Texas School of Law endowed a chair in his name.
