= Lazy S Ranch =

Ranch in Texas, US

Lazy S Ranch was a ranch in Texas that was founded in 1898 by Christopher Columbus Slaughter. The ranch stood at about 250,000 acres in Cochran and Hockley County, most of which in a 180,000-acre contiguous pasture. The ranch was home to 37,000 heads of cattle. Slaughter ran the ranch adequately until his death in 1919. Then, his heirs took the natural resources, accumulated US$270,000 in debts. All the cattle were collected over 49 days, and divided the land ten ways. In the 1930s, oil was discovered on the land. In 1969, the land was given to Cochran and Hockley County.
