= Christopher Columbus Slaughter =

American rancher, cattle drover, cattle breeder, banker and philanthropist (1837–1919)

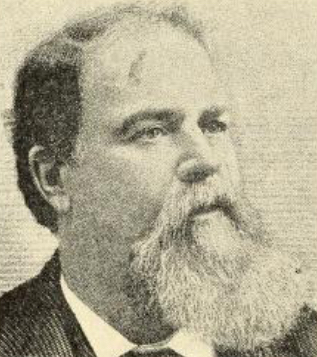
- Slaughter in a 1925 publication
- Born: February 9, 1837; Sabine County, Republic of Texas
- Died: January 25, 1919 (aged 81); Dallas, Texas, U.S.
- Resting place: Greenwood Cemetery, Dallas, Texas, U.S.
- Education: Larissa College
- Occupations: Rancher, cattle drover, cattle breeder, banker, philanthropist
- Title: Colonel
- Spouses: Cynthia Anna Jowell; Carrie Averill
- Children: 9, including Robert Lee Slaughter
- Parent(s): George Webb Slaughter; Sarah Mason
- Relatives: John Bunyan Slaughter (brother); William B. Slaughter (brother); Ira P. DeLoache (son-in-law)
- Military career
- Allegiance: Confederate States of America (1861–1865)
- Branch: Confederate States Army
- Service years: 1861–1865
- Rank: Colonel

Christopher Columbus Slaughter (also known as C. C. Slaughter or Lum Slaughter; February 9, 1837 – January 25, 1919) was an American rancher, cattle drover, cattle breeder, banker and philanthropist in the American frontier. After serving in the Confederate States Army during the American Civil War of 1861–1865, he came to own 40,000 cattle and over one million acres of ranch land in West Texas. He became the largest taxpayer in Texas, and used his wealth to endow Baptist institutions. He was known as the "Cattle King of Texas".

== Early life ==
Christopher Columbus Slaughter was born on February 9, 1837, in Sabine County, Texas. His father, George Webb Slaughter (1811–1895), was a Baptist minister and rancher; his mother was Sarah (Mason) Slaughter (1818–1894). At the age of twelve, he took up cattle handling on the Sabine River and the Trinity River. He moved to Freestone County, Texas in 1852 with his family. Later, he drove timber from Anderson County to Dallas County, where he sold it. He also processed wheat in Collin County, Texas and sold it in Magnolia, Anderson County. Meanwhile, he was educated by private tutors at home and later at the defunct Larissa College in Larissa, Cherokee County, Texas.

== Career ==
In 1857, Slaughter became a rancher with his father in Palo Pinto County, Texas, where they owned 15,000 cattle. They sold beef to Fort Belknap and local Native American reservations. During the American Civil War of 1861–1865, he served as a colonel in Terry's Texas Rangers of the Confederate States Army (C.S.A.). Together with Charles Goodnight, he helped rescue Cynthia Ann Parker.

Shortly after the civil war, Slaughter explored Mexico with Goodnight and four other companions. However, the expedition came to an end as he was accidentally wounded by a gunshot. Later, he became a cattle drover on the Chisholm Trail in Kansas. In 1873, he founded C. C. Slaughter and Company, a cattle breeding firm. Four years later, in 1877, he purchased the Long S Ranch, one of the largest ranches in West Texas. That same year, he cofounded the Texas and Southwestern Cattle Raisers Association. In 1873, he co-founded the City Bank, later known as City National Bank. He served as its vice president of 1881. Meanwhile, the town of Slaughter, Texas in Midland County, Texas was named after him in 1882. In 1884, Slaughter established the American National Bank, later known as the American Exchange National Bank, now part of First National Bank.

Slaughter became known as the "Cattle King of Texas". Indeed, by 1905, he owned 40,000 cattle and oversaw over a million acres of land in West Texas by 1905. He bred Shorthorns with Herefords. His ranches included portions of Howard County, Dawson County, Borden County, Martin County, Castro County, Lamb County, Hale County, Lynn County, and Cochran County. For example, he owned the Long S Ranch, but also the 25,000-acre Lazy S Ranch and the 17,000-acre Zavala Ranch, formerly part of the Mallet Ranch, as well as the Whiteface Ranch near Lubbock, Texas. For years, he was the largest taxpayer in Texas.

Slaughter served as president of the United Confederate Veterans. He also served as vice president of the Southern Baptist Convention and a member of the executive board of the Baptist General Convention of Texas. Additionally, he served on the Texas Baptist Education Commission in 1897. In 1904, he established the Baylor Hospital of Dallas in 1904, and he went on to serve on its board of trustees. He was also a donor to the Texas Baptist Memorial Sanitarium and the Nurses' Home and Training School. It has been known as the Baylor University Medical Center at Dallas. Additionally, he served on the board of trustees of the Southwestern Baptist Theological Seminary.

== Personal life ==
Slaughter married Cynthia Anna Jowell (1849–1876) in 1861, at the beginning of the civil war. They had five children. He then remarried, to Carrie Averill (1861–1928) in Emporia, Kansas in 1877, and they had four children.

In 1910, he became crippled after he broke his hip. He also had a debilitating loss of eyesight.

== Death and legacy ==
Slaughter died on January 25, 1919, in Dallas, Texas. He was buried in Greenwood Cemetery in Dallas. Shortly after his death, his son Bob Slaughter accused his uncle Bill Slaughter (C.C.'s brother), who managed the Long S Ranch, of trying to sell the Western S Ranch in Hudspeth County, Texas to Mexican ranchers, even though the ranch belonged to his son. As a result, Bob shot his uncle; this resulted in a US$3 million slander suit filed by the uncle against his nephew Bob. By 1921, his heirs divided his Long S Ranch and other land holdings, and sold them.

One of his daughters, Nelle (Slaughter) DeLoache, married Ira P. DeLoache (1879–1965), the real estate developer who founded Preston Hollow.

== Secondary sources ==
- Clarke, Mary Whatley. The Slaughter Ranches and Their Makers. Austin: Jenkins, 1979.
- Murrah, David J.. C. C. Slaughter: Rancher, Banker, Baptist. Austin: University of Texas Press, 1981; 2nd edition published by the University of Oklahoma Press, 2012.
