= Texas State Highway 114 =

State highway in Texas, United States

State Highway 114
- SH 114; mainline in red, business routes in blue

Route information
- Maintained by TxDOT
- Length: 194.464 mi (Note: The certified mileage given is shorter than the actual mileage as TxDOT considers SH 114 to be discontinuous at rather than concurrent with US 62, US 82, US 281, US 380, and US 81/US 287.) (312.959 km)
- Existed: by 1933–present

Major junctions
- West end: NM 114 at the New Mexico state line near Lingo, NM
- US 82 in Lubbock; US 84 in Lubbock; I-27 / US 87 in Lubbock; US 62 from Lubbock to Ralls; US 82 / US 183 / US 277 / US 283 in Seymour; US 281 in Jacksboro; US 380 from Jacksboro to Bridgeport; US 81 / US 287 in Rhome; I-35W in Fort Worth
- East end: SH 183 in Irving

Location
- Country: United States
- State: Texas
- Counties: Cochran, Hockley, Lubbock, Crosby, Dickens, King, Knox, Baylor, Archer, Young, Jack, Wise, Denton, Tarrant, Dallas

Highway system
- Highways in Texas; Interstate; US; State; Former; Toll; Loops; Spurs; FM/RM; Park; Rec
← SH 113	→ SH 115

State Highway 114 (SH 114) is a state highway that runs from the Dallas–Fort Worth metroplex westward across Texas to the New Mexico state line, where it becomes New Mexico State Road 114, which eventually ends at Elida, New Mexico at US 70 / NM 330.

== History ==

The route was originally designated on April 14, 1926, as a connector between Dallas and Rhome. In June 1932, SH 114 was extended to Bridgeport. On February 12, 1935, an extension northward from Chico to Sunset was added. On July 15, 1935, the section from Chico to Sunset was cancelled (as it was not fully built). This section was restored on August 1, 1938. On October 6, 1943, the section of SH 114 from US 77 in Dallas to US 67 became a portion of Loop 12. On October 1, 1968, the concurrency with SH 24 from Bridgeport to Chico was removed because SH 24 (now US 380) was rerouted. On January 7, 1971, SH 114 was relocated to Bridgeport. This route remained little changed until November 3, 1972, when it was extended northward from Sunset to Bowie. Major rerouting was made on November 24, 1975, when the route was redirected west over U.S. Highway 380, U.S. Highway 281, former SH 199, and U.S. Highway 82 from Bridgeport to Lubbock, with the stretch from Bridgeport to Bowie renumbered as SH 101. On December 14, 1977, the route was extended to the New Mexico state line, replacing SH 116. The connecting NM 116 was renumbered to NM 114.

On August 2, 1985, Delta Air Lines Flight 191 crossed this route shortly before crashing on approach to Dallas/Fort Worth Airport. One of the aircraft's engines struck a car on the roadway, instantly killing its occupant; 136 people on the flight also died in the accident.

In 2010, work began on an 8.4 miles (13.5 km) stretch, dubbed the DFW Connector, between SH 121 and International Parkway. A quarter of the $1 billion project was funded by federal stimulus funds enacted under the American Recovery and Reinvestment Act of 2009. The project's aim was to ease congestion at North Texas' worst traffic problem. The project called for as many as 24 lanes and 2 TEXpress lanes along a 4 miles (6.4 km) mile stretch between SH 26 and International Parkway. The Texas Department of Transportation (TxDOT) awarded the project in a joint venture led by Kiewit. The SH 114 section of the DFW Connector was completed in 2014.

== Route description ==
SH 114 starts at the New Mexico state line about 17 miles west of Morton, Texas. The route passes through Whiteface, Levelland, and Smyer as Levelland Highway before joining 19th Street in Lubbock. SH 114 crosses over Loop 289 and while crossing over US 82 joins with US 62, forming the southern edge of the Texas Tech University campus. After crossing US 84, the highway veers northeast, joining US 82 before crossing over Loop 289 and leaving Lubbock as Idalou Road.

Past Lubbock, SH 114 passes through the rural towns of Idalou, Lorenzo, Ralls (where US 62 turns north), Crosbyton, Dickens, Guthrie, Benjamin, Vera, Red Springs, and Seymour, where US 82 splits north off of SH 114. From there, the highway passes through Megargel, Olney, Loving, and Jermyn before entering Jacksboro with US 281. In Jacksboro, SH 114 joins US 380 and US 281 splits off to the south as SH 114 continues east.

Past Jacksboro, SH 114 passes through Runaway Bay, Bridgeport, where SH 114 splits off of US 380, Paradise, Boyd, Aurora, and Rhome, briefly running concurrent with US 81 and US 287 before entering Fort Worth and passing the Texas Motor Speedway and crossing I-35W.

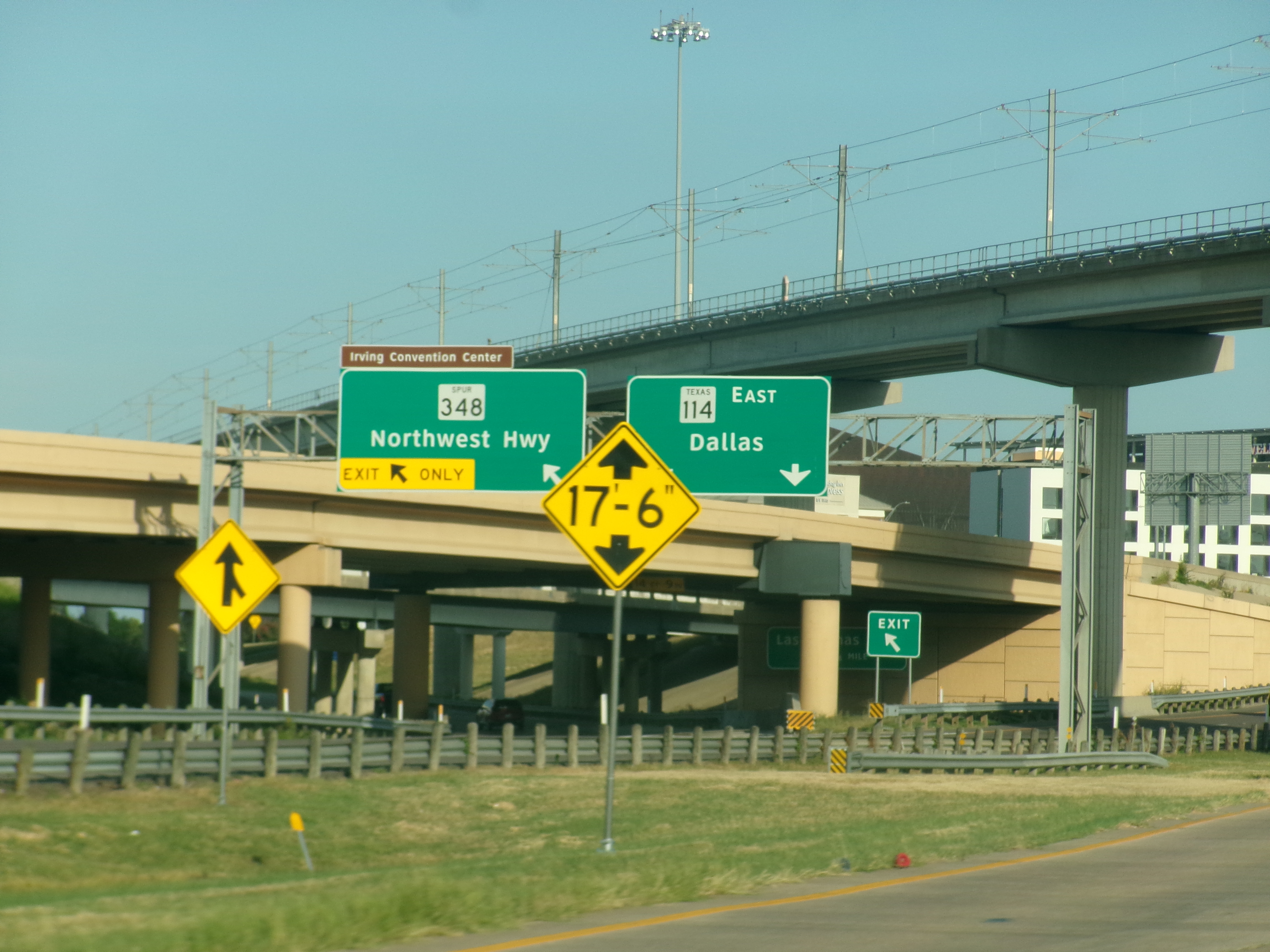
Looking east on SH 114 at the Spur 348 interchange (Northwest Highway) in Irving

In the DFW Metroplex, SH 114 goes through Roanoke, crossing US 377 and becoming a freeway, the Northwest Parkway. The highway passes through Westlake, Southlake, and Grapevine. There, SH 114 forms the northern edge of the Dallas Fort Worth International Airport with SH 121. The highway becomes the John W. Carpenter Highway as it travels southeast to its eastern terminus at SH 183. A road was designated on February 21, 1938, from SH 114 to SH 121; either SH 114 Loop or SH 121 Loop. This was renumbered as Loop 10 on September 26, 1939.

== Business routes ==
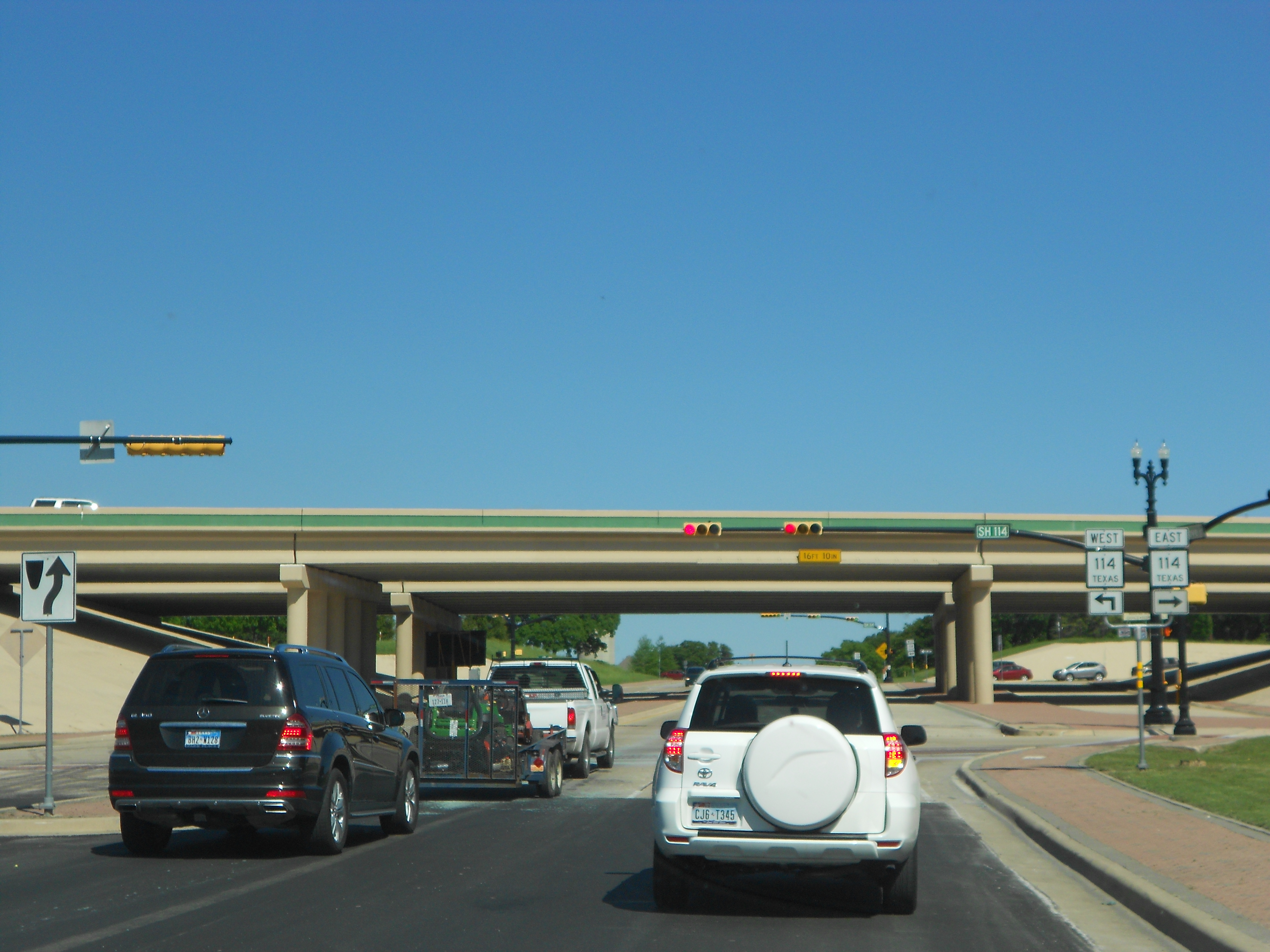
SH 114 at an interchange with Dove Road

SH 114 has three current business routes.

=== Levelland business loop ===

Business State Highway 114-B (formerly Loop 44) is a Business Loop that runs from SH 114 on the west side of Levelland (in west Texas) south along West Street, then east through the downtown area on Houston Street to an intersection with US 385 (College Street). The road turns left (north), concurrent with US 385, until intersecting once again at SH 114. The road was designated as Loop 44 on September 26, 1939, as a renumbering of SH 24 Spur, but was changed to Business SH 114-B on January 26, 1993, by district request, and is 1.594 miles (2.565 km) long.

=== Rhome business spur ===

Business State Highway 114-J is a Business Spur that goes east into Rhome from the intersection of US 81/US 287 and SH 114 west. The route runs along Rhome Avenue to an intersection with Business US 81-E. It is part of a previous route of SH 114. The Business route was designated on May 31, 1972, as Texas State Highway Spur 440 (but signed as Business SH 114), but it was changed to its current designation on June 21, 1990, and is 0.329 miles (0.529 km) long. Note that an earlier Spur 440 was designated on October 3, 1966, as a spur of SH 34 in Ennis. This was cancelled on or before the day the later Spur 440 was designated.

=== Roanoke business loop ===
Business State Highway 114-K is a business loop that runs through Roanoke. This route runs on Byron Nelson Boulevard, along a previous route of SH 114. The business route was created in 2001 when SH 114 was rerouted further north and east around town. The route is 1.787 miles (2.876 km) long.

== Former business routes ==
=== Former Bridgeport business loop ===

Business State Highway 114-H was located in Bridgeport between June 21, 1990, and March 29, 2007, and was 1.3 miles (2.1 km) long. The route went east along Halsell Avenue from an intersection with SH 114, to an intersection with 13th Street, then turned right (south) until another intersection with SH 114. This route had been previously designated Loop 373 on November 1, 1962; since 2007, though, the portion along 13th was changed back to Loop 373.

=== Former Grapevine business loop ===

Business State Highway 114-L (formerly Loop 382 as well as a previous routing of SH 114) is a business loop that runs through Grapevine. This route runs east on Northwest Highway to an intersection with Texan Trail, then turns right to go southbound there. The road continues until it reaches SH 114/SH 121. The portion of the business route along Texan Trail is concurrent with SH 26. The route was designated on April 18, 1963, as Texas State Highway Loop 382 (but signed as Business SH 114), until June 21, 1990, when the road's designation as Loop 382 was discontinued. On November 21, 2013, the entire route was removed and returned to the city of Grapevine.

== Major intersections ==
County	Location	mi	km	Destinations	Notes
Cochran		0.0	0.0	NM 114 west – Dora	New Mexico state line
Cochran	Griffith	1.7	2.7	FM 595 – Bledsoe	
Cochran		8.5	13.7	FM 596 north – Maple	South end of FM 596
Cochran	Star Route	10.6	17.1	FM 3304 south	North end of FM 3304
Cochran	Morton	17.0	27.4	SH 214 (Main Street) – Muleshoe, Plains	
Cochran		19.8	31.9	FM 2195 south	North end of FM 2195
Cochran		24.2	38.9	FM 1337 north	South end of FM 1337
Cochran		28.8	46.3	FM 1780 north	West end of overlap with FM 1780
Cochran		28.9	46.5	FM 1780 south (North Taylor Street) to SH 125 – Whiteface, Girlstown USA	East end of overlap with FM 1780
Hockley		33.9	54.6	FM 303 north – Pettit, Pep	West end of overlap with FM 303
Hockley		35.3	56.8	FM 303 south – Sundown	East end of overlap with FM 303
Hockley		41.1	66.1	FM 1490 north	South end of FM 1490
Hockley	Levelland	42.1	67.8	Bus. SH 114 east (West Avenue)	East end of Bus. SH 114-B
Hockley	Levelland	43.2	69.5	US 385 (College Avenue, Bus. SH 114) – Littlefield, Brownfield, South Plains College	West end of Bus. SH 114-B
Hockley		45.8	73.7	FM 3261 south (H. Moreland Road)	
Hockley		49.0	78.9	FM 2646	
Hockley	Smyer	54.4	87.5	FM 168 north – Anton	West end of overlap with FM 168
Hockley	Smyer	55.0	88.5	FM 168 south – Ropesville	East end of overlap with FM 168
Hockley		57.1	91.9	FM 2130 north – Roundup	South end of FM 2130
Lubbock		59.8	96.2	FM 2378	
Lubbock	Lubbock	62.9	101.2	Spur 309 north (Research Boulevard)	Formerly Quitsna Avenue, south end of Spur 309
Lubbock	Lubbock	63.9	102.8	FM 179 (Inler Avenue) – Shallowater, Wolfforth	
Lubbock	Lubbock	67.6	108.8	Loop 289	interchange
Lubbock	Lubbock	70.2	113.0	US 62 west / US 82	interchange; no direct access from SH 114 east to US 62 west / US 82 west, US 62 east / US 82 east to SH 114 west, or US 82 west to SH 114 east; west end of US 62 overlap
Lubbock	Lubbock	72.8	117.2	US 84 (Avenue Q)	
Lubbock	Lubbock	73.6	118.4	I-27 / US 87	I-27 exit 3
Lubbock	Lubbock	73.8	118.8	Avenue A	former Bus. US 87
Lubbock	Lubbock	76.3	122.8	FM 40 east (East 4th Street)	West end of FM 40
Lubbock	Lubbock	76.9	123.8	US 82 west (Parkway Drive)	interchange; no eastbound exit; west end of US 82 overlap
see US 82
Baylor	Seymour	230.3	370.6	US 82 east / Bus. US 183 north / Bus. US 277 north / Bus. US 283 north (Main Street) / FM 422 east – Vernon, Wichita Falls, Archer City	east end of US 82 overlap; west end of US 183 Bus. / US 277 Bus. / US 283 Bus. overlap
Baylor	Seymour	231.0	371.8	Bus. US 183 south / Bus. US 277 south / Bus. US 283 south (South Main Street) – Throckmorton, Abilene	east end of US 183 Bus. / US 277 Bus. / US 283 Bus. overlap
Baylor	Seymour	231.8	373.0	US 183 / US 277 / US 283 – Wichita Falls, Abilene	Interchange
Baylor		232.1	373.5	FM 1286 south	
Baylor		235.6	379.2	FM 2180 east	
Baylor		240.3	386.7	FM 1790 north – Vernon	
Baylor		242.2	389.8	FM 1285 south	
Archer		251.8	405.2	FM 1285 west	
Archer	Megargel	253.2	407.5	FM 210 north – Archer City	West end of overlap with FM 210
Archer	Megargel	253.3	407.6	FM 210 south (1st Street)	East end of overlap with FM 210
Young		263.3	423.7	FM 2178 north – Lake Cooper, Archer City, NAVSPASUR Station	West end of overlap with FM 2178
Young		263.6	424.2	FM 2178 south	East end of overlap with FM 2178
Young	Olney	264.3	425.3	Loop 132 (Avenue M)	
Young	Olney	265.1	426.6	SH 79 – Archer City, Throckmorton	
Young	Jean	274.9	442.4	FM 1769 – Markley, Graham	
Young		278.6	448.4	FM 2652	
Young	Loving	282.2	454.2	SH 16 – Wichita Falls, Graham	
Jack		287.7	463.0	FM 2950 north	
Jack	Jermyn	289.4	465.7	FM 1191 south – Bryson	West end of overlap with FM 1191
Jack	Jermyn	289.7	466.2	FM 1191 north – Antelope	East end of overlap with FM 1191
Jack		295.8	476.0	US 281 north – Windthorst, Wichita Falls	West end of overlap with US 281
Jack	Jacksboro	302.4	486.7	SH 148 north – Henrietta	South end of SH 148
Jack	Jacksboro			FM 3344 north (Post Oak Road)	
Jack	Jacksboro	303.2	488.0	US 380 west / SH 59 north (Belknap Street)	West end of overlap with US 380 / SH 199
Jack	Jacksboro	304.0	489.2	PR 61 – Fort Richardson State Park	East end of Park Road 61
Jack		305.7	492.0	US 281 south / SH 199 east – Mineral Wells, Fort Worth	East end of overlap with US 281 / SH 199
Jack		312.3	502.6	FM 1156 north – Wizard Wells	
Jack	Vineyard	316.3	509.0	FM 1156 – Wizard Wells, Joplin	
Wise	Bridgeport	325.7	524.2	FM 1658 north	
Wise	Bridgeport	328.6	528.8	FM 1658 – Bridgeport	
Wise	Bridgeport	329.4	530.1	US 380 east / SH 101 north – Decatur	East end of overlap with US 380, south end of SH 101
Wise	Bridgeport			FM 1658 west	
Wise	Bridgeport	329.8	530.8	FM 920 south	
Wise	Bridgeport	330.4	531.7	Loop 373 (13th Street)	
Wise	Bridgeport	331.1	532.9	FM 2123 south	
Wise	Paradise	336.0	540.7	Loop 444 / FM 3259 east	
Wise	Paradise	336.8	542.0	Loop 444	
Wise		339.5	546.4	FM 51 north – Decatur	West end of overlap with FM 51
Wise		340.8	548.5	FM 51 south – Springtown	East end of overlap with FM 51; interchange
Wise	Boyd	346.0	556.8	FM 730 south (South Allen Street) – Azle	West end of overlap with FM 730
Wise	Boyd	346.5	557.6	FM 730 north – Decatur	East end of overlap with FM 730
Wise	Aurora	348.9	561.5	FM 718 south – Newark	
Wise	Rhome	351.1	565.0	US 81 north / US 287 north / Bus. SH 114 east – Decatur	Interchange, west end of overlap with US 81 / US 287, west end of Bus. Route 114
Wise	Rhome	352.2	566.8	Bus. US 81 north / Bus. US 287 north / Bus. SH 114 west / FM 3433 – Rhome	interchange
Wise	Rhome	352.7	567.6	US 81 south / US 287 south – Fort Worth	Interchange, east end of overlap with US 81 / US 287
Denton		361.9	582.4	FM 156 – Justin, Fort Worth	Interchange
Denton	Fort Worth	362.5	583.4	Double Eagle Boulevard	Interchange
Denton	Fort Worth–Northlake line	364.1	586.0	I-35W – Denton, Fort Worth	I-35W exit 70
Denton	Northlake	365.1	587.6	Cleveland Gibbs Road / Dale Earnhardt Way	West end of freeway
Denton	Roanoke	366.5	589.8	Bus. SH 114 east (Byron Nelson Boulevard)	Right-in/right-out eastbound
Denton	Roanoke	366.7	590.1	Litsey Road / Briarwick Parkway	
Denton	Roanoke	367.5	591.4	US 377	
Denton	Roanoke	368.3	592.7	Bus. SH 114 west – Roanoke	
Denton	Westlake	368.6	593.2	SH 170 west	
Denton	Westlake			Schwab Way / Trophy Lake Drive	no direct eastbound exit (access is at SH 170)
Denton	Westlake			Trophy Club Drive / Westlake Parkway	
Denton	Westlake	370.6	596.4	FM 1938 (Davis Boulevard)	
Tarrant	Westlake–Southlake line	371.6	598.0	Solana Boulevard / Kirkwood Boulevard	
Tarrant	Southlake	372.5	599.5	Dove Road	
Tarrant	Southlake	373.3	600.8	White Chapel Boulevard	no direct eastbound exit (signed at Dove Road)
Tarrant	Southlake	374.5	602.7	Carroll Avenue	
Tarrant	Southlake	375.7	604.6	Kimball Avenue	
Tarrant	Southlake	376.6	606.1	Bus. SH 114 east (Northwest Highway) / FM 1709 (East Southlake Boulevard)	Access to Baylor Scott & White Medical Center – Grapevine
Tarrant	Grapevine			SH 114 Express east	eastbound exit and westbound entrance
Tarrant	Grapevine	377.3	607.2	SH 26 south / Ira E. Woods / Main Street	West end of overlap with SH 26
Tarrant	Grapevine	377.6	607.7	William D. Tate Avenue	
Tarrant	Grapevine	377.4	607.4	SH 121 south to SH 360 south – Fort Worth, Arlington, Grand Prairie	West end of overlap with SH 121
Tarrant	Grapevine	377.8	608.0	Main Street -Grapevine Historic District	no direct eastbound exit (signed at William D. Tate Avenue)
Tarrant	Grapevine	378.8	609.6	SH 26 north / Bus. SH 114 west (Texan Trail)	East end of overlap with SH 26
Tarrant	Grapevine	379.3	610.4	SH 121 north / I-635 east	East end of overlap with SH 121; no access from SH 114 west to I-635 east
Tarrant	Grapevine	379.8	611.2	DFW Airport (International Parkway)	
Tarrant	Grapevine			SH 114 Express west	westbound exit and eastbound entrance
Dallas	Irving	381.5	614.0	Freeport Parkway	
Dallas	Irving	381.6	614.1	Esters Boulevard	
Dallas	Irving	381.7	614.3	Belt Line Road	
Dallas	Irving	384.6	619.0	Pres. George Bush Turnpike	
Dallas	Irving	385.3	620.1	MacArthur Boulevard	Access to Las Colinas Medical Center
Dallas	Irving	385.8	620.9	Walnut Hill Lane / Love Drive / Hidden Ridge Drive	
Dallas	Irving	387.3	623.3	Spur 348 (Northwest Highway) / Hidden Ridge Drive – Irving Convention Center	
Dallas	Irving	387.5	623.6	O'Connor Road / Wingren Road	
Dallas	Irving	388.3	624.9	Riverside Drive / Rochelle Boulevard / Wingren Road / Cistercian Road	
Dallas	Irving	389.0	626.0	Loop 12 / Tom Braniff Drive / Cistercian Road	
Dallas	Irving	391.0	629.3	SH 183 / Spur 482 (Storey Lane) – Dallas, Fort Worth	
1.000 mi = 1.609 km; 1.000 km = 0.621 mi: Concurrency terminus; Incomplete access
