= Bryson High School (Bryson, Texas) =

Coordinates: 33.1638°N 98.3822°W

Location
- 309 McCloud St; Bryson, Texas 76427-0309; United States

Information
- School type: Public high school
- School district: Bryson Independent School District
- Principal: Gary Kirby
- Teaching staff: 20.83 (FTE)
- Grades: PK-12
- Enrollment: 251 (2023–2024)
- Student to teacher ratio: 12.05
- Colors: Blue & Gold
- Athletics conference: UIL Class A
- Mascot: Cowboy/Cowgirl
- Yearbook: Round-Up
- Website: Bryson High School

Bryson High School or Bryson School is a public secondary school located in Bryson, Texas, United States, and classified as a 1A school by the UIL. It is part of the Bryson Independent School District located in west central Jack County. In 2015, the school was rated "Met Standard" by the Texas Education Agency.

== Athletics ==
The Bryson Cowboys compete in cross country, volleyball, six-man football, basketball, softball and baseball. The girls' basketball team reached the state finals in 1952–53.
