= Texas State Highway 199 =

State highway in Texas

State Highway 199
- SH 199, highlighted in red

Route information
- Maintained by TxDOT
- Length: 53.254 mi (Note: The certified mileage given is shorter than the actual mileage as TxDOT considers SH 199 to be discontinuous at rather than concurrent with US 281.) (85.704 km)
- Existed: by 1934–present

Major junctions
- West end: US 281 / US 380 / SH 59 / SH 114 at Jacksboro
- I-820 at Fort Worth
- East end: I-30 / US 377 at Fort Worth

Location
- Country: United States
- State: Texas

Highway system
- Highways in Texas; Interstate; US; State; Former; Toll; Loops; Spurs; FM/RM; Park; Rec
← SH 198	→ SH 200

State Highway 199 is a northwest-to-southeast state route that runs from U.S. Route 380/State Highway 59 in Jacksboro to Interstate 30/U.S. Route 377 in Fort Worth.

== Route description ==
SH 199 begins at an intersection with U.S. Route 380/State Highway 59 in Jacksboro near the Jack County courthouse, with the road continuing north as U.S. Route 281/State Highway 114. The highway begins with a concurrency with US 281/US 380/SH 114, with US 380/SH 114 leaving just south of the Jacksboro city limits. SH 199 continues its overlap with US 281 until about 7 miles south of Jacksboro, with US 281 traveling south to Mineral Wells. The highway travels southeast to the town of Joplin, where it intersects with Farm to Market Road 1156. In Springtown, SH 199 goes from a two lane undivided highway to a four lane divided highway. Most of the highway from Azle to near Lakeside is a freeway. SH 199 travels through the town of Lake Worth as a divided highway with a wide median until reaching Interstate 820 at a modified cloverleaf interchange. Just inside Interstate 820, SH 199 enters the city limits of Fort Worth and intersects State Highway 183 just northeast of River Oaks. SH 199 crosses over both the West and Clear Forks of the Trinity River and enters Downtown Fort Worth. At 5th Street, the highway turns south before ending at an interchange with Interstate 30/U.S. Route 377.

=== Names ===
- In Jacksboro, SH 199 is routed along South Main Street.
- In Azle, the highway has two names: Northwest Parkway northwest of the center of town, and Southeast Parkway to the southeast.
- In Lake Worth, the highway is known as "Lake Worth Boulevard".
- In Fort Worth, SH 199 within the city limits and northwest of downtown, is known as "Jacksboro Highway", as the route's other end is in Jacksboro.
- In Downtown Fort Worth, the highway is known as "Henderson Street."

== History ==
State Highway 199 was designated on September 18, 1933 from Jacksboro to Olney. On September 26, 1939, SH 199 was extended northwest to Seymour, replacing part of SH 24. On October 30, 1939, SH 199 was extended southeast to Fort Worth, replacing SH 319. On November 25, 1975, the section from Jacksboro to Seymour was transferred to SH 114.

== Major intersections ==
County	Location	mi	km	Destinations	Notes
Jack	Jacksboro	0.0	0.0	US 281 north / US 380 west / SH 59 north / SH 114 west – Olney	west end of US 281 / US 380 / SH 114 overlap
Jack	Jacksboro	0.8	1.3	PR 61 – Fort Richardson State Park	
Jack		2.5	4.0	US 380 east / SH 114 east – Runaway Bay, Bridgeport, Dallas	east end of US 380 / SH 114 overlap
Jack		4.1	6.6	FM 3324 south	
Jack		7.3	11.7	US 281 south – Mineral Wells	east end of US 281 overlap
Jack	Joplin	13.5	21.7	FM 1156 north – Vineyard, Wizard Wells	
Jack		17.1	27.5	FM 2210 – Gibtown	
Wise		22.7	36.5	FM 920 north – Bridgeport	west end of FM 920 overlap
Wise		22.8	36.7	FM 920 south – Weatherford	east end of FM 920 overlap
Parker	Springtown	33.7	54.2	Loop 182	
Parker	Springtown	34.1	54.9	FM 51 – Decatur, Weatherford	
Parker		38.5	62.0	FM 2257 north (Jay Bird Lane)	
Parker	Sanctuary	40.1	64.5	FM 1542 north – Reno	
Parker	Azle	42.6	68.6	Loop 344 east / FM 730 south	interchange; west end of freeway; no direct westbound exit (FM 730 north exit serves both directions)
Tarrant	Azle	43.2	69.5	FM 730 north – Boyd	
Tarrant	Azle	43.8	70.5	Loop 344 (Main Street) / Stewart Street	
Tarrant	Azle	44.4	71.5	Denver Trail	access to Texas Health Harris Methodist Hospital Azle; no direct westbound exit (signed at Wells-Burnett Road)
Tarrant	Azle	45.3	72.9	Normandy Avenue / Wells-Burnett Road	
Tarrant	Fort Worth	47.0	75.6	Hanger Cut-Off Road / Tenderfoot Trail	no direct eastbound exit (signed at Normandy Avenue)
Tarrant	Fort Worth	48.3	77.7	Nine Mile Bridge Road	
Tarrant	Fort Worth	49.4	79.5	FM 1886 (Confederate Park Road)	interchange; east end of freeway
Tarrant	Lake Worth	53.7	86.4	I-820	I-820 exit 10A
Tarrant	Fort Worth	56.4	90.8	SH 183 (Ephriham Avenue / River Oaks Boulevard) – NAS Fort Worth JRB, FMC Carswell, River Oaks	
Tarrant	Fort Worth	59.9	96.4	Spur 347 east (Weatherford Street)	
Tarrant	Fort Worth	60.8	97.8	I-30 / US 377 / Presidio Street	I-30 exit 13B
1.000 mi = 1.609 km; 1.000 km = 0.621 mi: Concurrency terminus
