= James C. Loving =

American rancher (1836–1902)

- Born: June 6, 1836; Hopkins County, Kentucky
- Died: November 24, 1902 (aged 66); Tarrant County, Texas
- Occupation: Rancher
- Parent(s): Oliver Loving; Susan Daggett Morgan Loving

James C. Loving (1836–1902) was an American cattleman and rancher in Texas. He raised "the largest purebred shorthorn herd" in the United States by the end of the nineteenth century. He was a co-founder of the Texas and Southwestern Cattle Raisers Association and served as its secretary for twenty-seven years.

== Biography ==
=== Early life ===
James Carrol Loving was born on June 6, 1836, in Hopkins County, Kentucky. His father, Oliver Loving (1812–1867), was a cattleman and drover, and his mother was Susan Daggett Morgan Loving (1809–1884). In 1845, they moved to Texas, eventually settling down in Palo Pinto County, Texas.

=== Career ===
During the American Civil War of 1861–1865, he served in the Confederate States Army. He became First Lieutenant, mostly by keeping Native Americans away from European settlers like himself in Texas.

Shortly after the war, he opened a general store in Weatherford, Parker County, Texas. In 1867, when his father died, he inherited his cattle holdings. In June 1868, together with Charles Goodnight, he drove 2,300 cattle to Colorado over a period of six months. Together with C.L. Carter, he owned a ranch near C.C. Slaughter's ranch called Dillingham Prairie Ranch.

In 1873, he established a ranch in Jermyn, Jack County in the Lost Valley. It was located 25 miles away from Graham and 15 miles away from Jacksboro, Texas. He reportedly raised "the largest purebred shorthorn herd in the nation."

However, much of his cattle was stolen by Native Americans and cattle raiders. As a result, in 1877, he became a co-founder of the Texas and Southwestern Cattle Raisers Association, together with forty other ranchers from Palo Pinto County, Young County, Parker County, and Shackelford County, including C.C. Slaughter. He served as its secretary for twenty-seven years, until his death in 1902. He also became its treasurer in 1879. The following year, in 1880, he published an almanac about the main herds of Texas and their owners. Four years later, in 1884, he moved the office of the Texas and Southwestern Cattle Raisers Associations to Jacksboro; three years later, in 1887, he moved it again, this time to Fort Worth, Texas.

=== Personal life ===
He married Mary Ellen Willett Loving in 1857. They had two children.

=== Death ===
He died on November 24, 1902, in Tarrant County, Texas.

== Bibliography ==
- The Stockmen's Guide and Handbook (1880)
