= Maryetta, Texas =

- Unincorporated community
- Location within Texas Location within the United States
- Coordinates: 33°17′54″N 98°4′30″W
- Country: United States
- State: Texas
- County: Jack
- Elevation: 915 ft (279 m)
- Time zone: UTC-6 (Central (CST))
  - Summer (DST): UTC-5 (CDT)
- Area code: 940
- GNIS feature ID: 1380150

Maryetta is an unincorporated community in Jack County, Texas, United States. According to the Handbook of Texas, the community had a population of 7 in 2000.

== History ==
The Maryetta area serves as a community center for local farmers. Its population was 87 in 1986, but only seven residents remained from 1990 through 2000.

Today, an old service station and a one-room schoolhouse that was used as a domino hall are all that remain in the community.

== Geography ==
Maryetta is located on Texas State Highway 59, 6 mi (9.7 km) northeast of Jacksboro in northeastern Jack County.

== Education ==
Today, the community is served by the Jacksboro Independent School District.

== See also ==
- U.S. Route 81 in Texas
