= Ed Breding =

American football player (born 1944)

No. 63, 78
- Position: Linebacker

Personal information
- Born: November 3, 1944 (age 82); Billings, Montana, U.S.
- Listed height: 6 ft 4 in (1.93 m)
- Listed weight: 235 lb (107 kg)

Career information
- High school: Jacksboro (Jacksboro, Texas)
- College: Texas A&M (1963-1966)
- NFL draft: 1967: 15th round, 378th overall pick

Career history
- Washington Redskins (1967–1968); Winnipeg Blue Bombers (1969–1971)

Career NFL statistics
- Fumble recoveries: 1
- Safeties: 1
- Stats at Pro Football Reference

Edward Vincent Breding (born November 3, 1944) is an American former professional football player who was a linebacker for the Washington Redskins of the National Football League (NFL). He played college football for the Texas A&M Aggies and was selected in the 15th round of the 1967 NFL/AFL draft. Breding spent the 1967 and 1968 seasons with the Redskins, appearing in 28 games as a middle linebacker.
