= Vineyard, Texas =

Unincorporated community in Jack County, Texas, United States

- Unincorporated community
- Location within Texas Location within the United States
- Coordinates: 33°10′4″N 97°57′59″W
- Country: United States
- State: Texas
- County: Jack
- Elevation: 945 ft (288 m)
- Time zone: UTC-6 (Central (CST))
  - Summer (DST): UTC-5 (CDT)
- Area code: 940
- GNIS feature ID: 1349297

Vineyard is an unincorporated community in Jack County, Texas, United States. According to the Handbook of Texas, the community had a population of 37 in 2000.

== Geography ==
Vineyard is located at the intersection of U.S. Route 380 / Texas State Highway 114 and Farm to Market Road 1156 on Beans Creek, 2 mi (3.2 km) south of Wizard Wells and 13 mi (21 km) southeast of Jacksboro in eastern Jack County.

== Education ==
Vineyard had its own school in 1933. Today, the community is served by the Jacksboro Independent School District.

== Notable person ==
- Edith Wilmans, lawyer and politician who became the first woman on the Texas State Legislature, lived on a farm in Vineyard in 1935.

== See also ==
- List of unincorporated communities in Texas
