= Jermyn, Texas =

- Unincorporated community
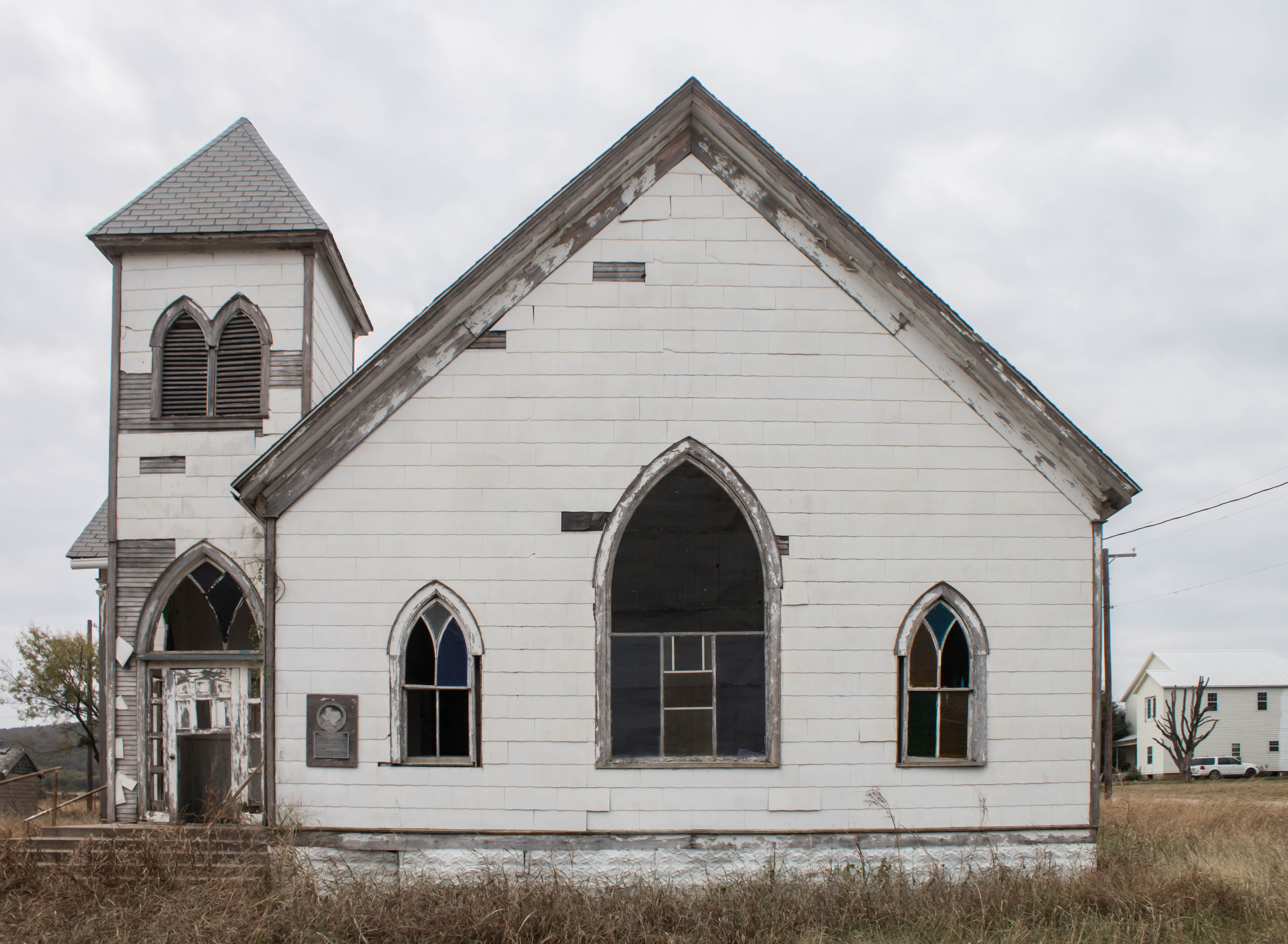
- Jermyn Methodist Church

- Location within Texas Location within the United States
- Coordinates: 33°15′51″N 98°23′18″W
- Country: United States
- State: Texas
- County: Jack
- Elevation: 1,168 ft (356 m)

Population (2000 est.)
  - Total: 75
- Time zone: UTC-6 (Central (CST))
  - Summer (DST): UTC-5 (CDT)
- Area code: 940
- GNIS feature ID: 1360225

Jermyn is an unincorporated community in Jack County, Texas, United States. According to the Handbook of Texas, the community had a population of 75 in 2000.

== History ==
Jermyn was founded in 1902, making it one of the final villages constructed in Jack County. It was named for J. J. Jermyn, the son of coal magnate Joe Jermyn of Scranton, Pennsylvania. Oliver Loving and W. P. Stewart, ranchers in Jack County, gave the town property. On October 21, 1909, the Gulf, Texas and Western Railroad's tracks arrived at the hamlet. There were a few shops, a bank, a church, and an estimated 213 people living in Jermyn in the 1920s. After that, it functioned as a hub for the local cattle industry and a shipping port. The town's population rose to 1,066 in 1968 but then started to fall. It was 75 in 1990 and 2000.

The 1984 Summer Olympics torch relay traveled through Jermyn on June 14, 1984.

James C. Loving settled in Jermyn in 1873.

== Geography ==
Jermyn is located at the intersection of Texas State Highway 114 and Farm to Market Road 1191, 10 mi (16 km) northwest of Jacksboro, 20 mi (32 km) northeast of Graham and 2.5 mi (4.0 km) east of the Young County line in far-western Jack County.

== Education ==
Jermyn had its own school in the 1920s. Today, the community is served by the Bryson Independent School District.
