= Texas State Highway 170 =

Highway in Texas

State Highway 170
- Alliance Gateway Freeway
- SH 170 highlighted in red

Route information
- Maintained by TxDOT
- Length: 6.516 mi (10.486 km)
- Existed: 1988–present

Major junctions
- West end: I-35W in Fort Worth
- US 377 in Fort Worth
- East end: SH 114 in Westlake

Location
- Country: United States
- State: Texas
- Counties: Tarrant, Denton

Highway system
- Highways in Texas; Interstate; US; State; Former; Toll; Loops; Spurs; FM/RM; Park; Rec
← SH 169	→ SH 171

State Highway 170 (SH 170), also known as the Alliance Gateway Freeway, is a Texas state highway in the northern suburbs of Fort Worth in the Alliance area. The highway was designated in 1988.

== History ==
=== Previous route ===
A previous route numbered SH 170 was designated on August 3, 1932, as a connector route from the Oklahoma state line west to US 60 and US 83 near Canadian. This route was renumbered SH 33 on October 26, 1954, to coincide with OK 33, with which it connects.

=== Current route ===
The current SH 170 was designated in 1988.

Construction of an interchange at SH 114 began in 2016.

TxDOT and the NTTA held a public hearing in Roanoke about the proposed toll road on February 26, 2015. The tollway was proposed to have six main lanes. The main lanes between I-35W and SH 114 opened to traffic on March 18, 2024.

== Proposed Tollway ==
The North Texas Tollway Authority (NTTA) planned to build tolled main lanes by 2015 and will extend the highway west to US 287/US 81, and, eventually, ultimately to extend it to the Jacksboro Highway (SH 199), but it did not occur.

== Exit list ==
County	Location	mi	km	Destinations	Notes
Tarrant	Fort Worth			US 287 / US 81	Proposed western terminus
Tarrant	Fort Worth			Blue Mound Road or Avondale-Haslet Road	Part of proposed tollway expansion, exit depends on routing of tollway
Tarrant	Fort Worth			FM 156 (Blue Mound Road)	Part of proposed tollway expansion
Tarrant	Fort Worth			Harmon Road	Part of proposed tollway expansion
Tarrant	Fort Worth	0.0	0.0	I-35W / Haslet Parkway	Current western terminus, exit 65 on I-35W, northbound TEXpress and local exit and southbound TEXpress and local entrance
Tarrant	Fort Worth	1.0	1.6	North Beach Street / Alta Vista Road	Eastbound exit and westbound entrance
Tarrant	Fort Worth	1.8	2.9	North Beach Street / Old Denton Road	Westbound exit and eastbound entrance
Tarrant	Fort Worth	2.3	3.7	Park Vista Boulevard	Eastbound exit and westbound entrance
Tarrant	Fort Worth	2.6	4.2	Westport Parkway	Westbound exit and eastbound entrance
Tarrant	Fort Worth	3.2	5.1	Park Vista Boulevard / Haslet-Roanoke Road	Westbound exit
Tarrant	Fort Worth	3.9	6.3	Independence Parkway	
Tarrant	Westlake	4.8	7.7	US 377 (Denton Highway)	Eastbound exit and westbound entrance, westbound exit via Roanoke Road
Tarrant	Westlake	5.3	8.5	Roanoke Road	Westbound exit and eastbound entrance
Denton	Westlake	5.7	9.2	Parish Lane	Former west end of freeway until March 18, 2024
Denton	Westlake	5.8– 6.9	9.3– 11.1	SH 114 / Schwab Way, Trophy Lake Drive	Westbound entrance and eastbound exit
1.000 mi = 1.609 km; 1.000 km = 0.621 mi: Incomplete access; Unopened
