= Chuck Curtis =

American football player and coach (1935–2016)

Biographical details
- Born: July 15, 1935; Gainesville, Texas, U.S.
- Died: May 9, 2016 (aged 80); Weatherford, Texas, U.S.

Playing career
- 1954–1956: TCU
- 1957: Winnipeg Blue Bombers
- 1957: New York Giants

Coaching career (HC unless noted)
- 1958: Holliday HS (TX)
- 1959–1962: Jacksboro HS (TX)
- 1963–1964: Garland HS (TX)
- 1965–1967: SMU (assistant)
- 1968: Grand Prairie HS (TX)
- 1979–1980: Jacksboro HS (TX)
- 1981–1983: Cleburne HS (TX)
- 1984–1985: UT Arlington
- 1987–1988: Aledo HS (TX)

Head coaching record
- Overall: 11–10–1 (college); 138–48–3 (high school)

Accomplishments and honors

Awards
- First-team All-SWC (1955); Second-team All-SWC (1956)

Charles Curtis (July 15, 1935 – May 9, 2016) was an American football player and coach. He played college football at Texas Christian University (TCU) and had a short stint with the New York Giants of the National Football League (NFL) in 1957. Curtis spent most of his coaching career, which spanned from 1958 to 1988, at the high school level in the state of Texas. At the college level, he served as the last head football coach at the University of Texas at Arlington, from 1984 to 1985, before the Texas–Arlington Mavericks football program was disbanded.

== Football career ==
Growing up in Gainesville, Texas as the son of a minister, Curtis played quarterback at Gainesville High School in the late 1940s and early 1950s. During his senior year Curtis' father moved to Taylor but allowed him to remain at Gainesville in a garage apartment to keep his eligibility. Despite All-State honors, college recruiters ignored him, except for Texas Christian's Abe Martin.

At TCU, Curtis led the Horned Frogs to the 1955 Southwest Conference championship. In the 1957 Cotton Bowl, Curtis threw two touchdown passes and ran for another touchdown to lead the Horned Frogs to a 28–27 win over Syracuse and standout running back Jim Brown. Garnering All-Southwest Conference honors in 1955 and 1956, Curtis was selected 85th overall by the defending champions, the New York Giants, in the 1957 NFL draft. Curtis signed instead with the Winnipeg Blue Bombers. Curtis played sparingly in Winnipeg and only dressed for two games. On September 12, 1957, Winnipeg traded Curtis to the New York Giants for linebacker Pete Mangum. In New York, Curtis was the backup quarterback for Charley Conerly, but did not see any action during the 1957 NFL season, yet as an aspiring coach it worked to his advantage. Both Vince Lombardi and Tom Landry were assistants on the Giants staff, and their system, he soon realized, far surpassed anything he had seen in four years at TCU.

== Coaching career ==
After one season with the Giants, Curtis returned to Texas to pursue a coaching career. He began at Holliday, where he led the 1958 Eagles to an 8–2 record and barely missed the playoffs. The following year Curtis moved to 2A Jacksboro, where he turned around a program in the dumps for ten consecutive years: culminating in the state title in 1962. The Tigers outscored their opponents 602–43 that year. Curtis soon moved on, as he succeeded Homer Johnson as head coach at 4A Garland. Guiding the Owls to back-to-back state titles in 1963 and '64, Curtis became the first coach in Texas high school football to win consecutive titles at different schools in different classifications, going 26–1–1 during that stretch. He also joined, at that time, Waco's Paul Tyson, Amarillo's Blair Cherry and Abilene's Chuck Moser as the only coaches to win three consecutive state crowns.

Curtis seriously considered the head coaching job at Odessa Permian, which just became vacant as Jim Cashion resigned, but eventually accepted an assistant coaching position on Hayden Fry's staff at SMU. In 1968, he returned to the high school level, taking over at Grand Prairie.

In 1979 Curtis briefly returned to Jacksboro, before taking over head coaching duties at Cleburne High School in 1981. In 1982, he guided the Yellow Jackets to the state semifinals but lost 7–3 to Don Denbow's Corsicana squad. Cleburne's 1983 team carried an unbeaten 13–0 record in the quarterfinal round, only to lose 13–3 to Lubbock Estacado. Curtis also coached in the Oil Bowl in 1983.

In 1984 Curtis finally got his first head coaching job at the collegiate level, taking over as the thirteenth head football coach at the University of Texas at Arlington. His career coaching record for the Mavericks was 11–10–1. This ranks him sixth at UT Arlington in total wins and eighth in winning percentage. UT-Arlington discontinued its football program after the conclusion of the 1985 season.

After one year out of coaching, Curtis returned to the high school level, becoming head coach at 3A Aledo. He guided the Bearcats to a 6–5 and 8–3 record in 1987 and 1988, respectively, before he retired.

== Death ==
Curtis died on May 9, 2016, following a lengthy undisclosed illness. He was 80.

== Head coaching record ==
=== College ===
| Year | Team | Overall | Conference | Standing | Bowl/playoffs |
|---|---|---|---|---|---|
UT Arlington Mavericks (Southland Conference) (1984–1985)
| 1984 | UT Arlington | 7–4 | 4–2 | 3rd | |
| 1985 | UT Arlington | 4–6–1 | 2–3–1 | T–5th | |
| UT Arlington: | | 11–10–1 | 6–5–1 | | |
| Total: | | 11–10–1 | | | |

=== High school ===
| Year | Team | Overall | Conference | Standing | Bowl/playoffs |
|---|---|---|---|---|---|
Holliday Eagles () (1958)
| 1958 | Holliday | 8–2 | | | |
| Holliday: | | 8–2 | | | |
Jacksboro Tigers () (1959–1962)
| 1959 | Jacksboro | 2–8 | | | |
| 1960 | Jacksboro | 9–1 | | | |
| 1961 | Jacksboro | 13–1 | | 1st | |
| 1962 | Jacksboro | 15–0 | | 1st | |
Garland Owls () (1963–1964)
| 1963 | Garland | 13–0–1 | | 1st | |
| 1964 | Garland | 13–1 | | 1st | |
| Garland: | | 26–1–1 | | | |
Grand Prairie Gophers () (1968)
| 1968 | Grand Prairie | 3–6–1 | | | |
| Grand Prairie: | | 3–6–1 | | | |
Jacksboro Tigers () (1979–1980)
| 1979 | Jacksboro | 4–6 | | | |
| 1980 | Jacksboro | 8–2–1 | | 1st | |
| Jacksboro: | | 51–18–1 | | | |
Cleburne Yellow Jackets () (1981–1983)
| 1981 | Cleburne | 7–3 | | | |
| 1982 | Cleburne | 13–2 | | 1st | |
| 1983 | Cleburne | 13–1 | | | |
| Cleburne: | | 33–6 | | | |
Aledo Bearcats () (1987–1989)
| 1987 | Aledo | 6–5 | | 2nd | |
| 1988 | Aledo | 8–3 | | 2nd | |
| 1989 | Aledo | 3–7 | | | |
| Aledo: | | 17–15 | | | |
| Total: | | 138–48–3 | | | |
National championship Conference title Conference division title or championship game berth
