= Cundiff, Texas =

- Unincorporated community
- Location within Texas Location within the United States
- Coordinates: 33°19′00″N 97°59′54″W
- Country: United States
- State: Texas
- County: Jack
- Elevation: 984 ft (300 m)
- Time zone: UTC-6 (Central (CST))
  - Summer (DST): UTC-5 (CDT)
- Area code: 940
- GNIS feature ID: 1355472

Cundiff is an unincorporated community in Jack County, Texas, United States. According to the Handbook of Texas, the community had a population of 45 in 2000.

== History ==
The region was first settled in the middle of the 1850s. Harrell Cundiff was one of the original settlers. In the 1860s, the prospect of Indian incursions drove many settlers off their homesteads. After the Indians were driven out of Jack County in the middle of the 1870s, people started moving back to the Cundiff region. It was not until the early 1890s that a permanent community was founded. Walker Moore established a townsite in 1891 and christened it Cundiff after dividing a large area of land into several farms. There was a post office in the town from 1891 to 1918. It also featured four businesses, a blacksmith shop, and a cotton gin around the turn of the century. The town's population stayed at about fifty from 1940 and 1988. It went down to 45 from 1990 through 2000.

The Butterfield Overland Mail operated Earhart's Station west of Cundiff.

== Geography ==
Cundiff is located on Farm to Market Road 1810, 10 mi (16 km) northeast of Jacksboro in northeastern Jack County.

== Education ==
Cundiff had its own school in the early 1900s. Today, the community is served by the Jacksboro Independent School District.
