= Postoak, Texas =

- Unincorporated community
- Location within Texas Location within the United States
- Coordinates: 33°27′25″N 98°8′35″W
- Country: United States
- State: Texas
- County: Jack
- Elevation: 997 ft (304 m)
- Time zone: UTC-6 (Central (CST))
  - Summer (DST): UTC-5 (CDT)
- Area code: 940
- GNIS feature ID: 1365671

Postoak is an unincorporated community in Jack County, Texas, United States. According to the Handbook of Texas, the community had a population of 79 in 2000.

== History ==
The area in what is known as Postoak today was established in 1878 and was named for a post oak tree that grew near its main street. A post office was established at Postoak in 1876. It also had a general store, a blacksmith shop, and a church that same year. The community has mostly been a community center and shipping point for local farmers. From the 1930s to the 1970s, Postoak had a little more than 100 residents, which then went down to 79 from 1990 through 2000.

== Geography ==
Postoak is located on Farm to Market Road 2127, two miles south of the Clay County line in north-central Jack County.

== Education ==
Today, the community is served by the Midway Independent School District.
