= Loving, Texas =

Loving
- Unincorporated community Census designated place
- Location within the state of Texas Loving (the United States)
- Coordinates: 33°15′46″N 98°30′56″W
- Country: United States
- State: Texas
- County: Young

Area
  - Total: 1.97 sq mi (5.11 km^{2})
  - Land: 1.97 sq mi (5.10 km^{2})
  - Water: 0.0039 sq mi (0.01 km^{2})
- Elevation: 1,286 ft (392 m)

Population (2020)
  - Total: 143
  - Density: 72.6/sq mi (28.0/km^{2})
- Time zone: UTC-6 (Central (CST))
  - Summer (DST): UTC-5 (CDT)
- Area code: 940
- GNIS feature ID: 2805853

Loving is an unincorporated community and census designated place (CDP) in Young County, Texas, United States. As of the 2020 census, Loving had a population of 143. It lies on State Highway 114 eighteen miles southeast of Olney in the northeastern part of the county.

== History ==
Loving was founded in 1907 on land that was part of the Lost Valley Loving Ranch, owned by Oliver Loving who was the grandson of the famous cattle drover, Oliver Loving. The town was moved approximately one mile to the north in 1909 in order to be along the Gulf, Texas and Western Railroad. Trinity Townsite Company trustee B.B. Cain platted the new town on land purchased from the Steadham brothers, members of a local ranching family. Loving grew at a slow but steady pace throughout the early and middle part of the twentieth century and by 1930 possessed several churches, businesses as well as its own school, and bank. The population peaked at 350 in 1940 but subsequently declined to 240 by 1980 and maintained this level through 1990 until 2000 when it had increased to 300 residents.

== Demographics ==
Historical population
Census	Pop.	Note	%±
2020	143		—
U.S. Decennial Census; 1850–1900 1910; 1920 1930 1940; 1950 1960 1970; 1980 1990 2000; 2010 2020

Loving first appeared as a census designated place in the 2020 U.S. census.

=== 2020 census ===
Loving CDP, Texas – Racial and ethnic composition Note: the US Census treats Hispanic/Latino as an ethnic category. This table excludes Latinos from the racial categories and assigns them to a separate category. Hispanics/Latinos may be of any race.
Race / Ethnicity (NH = Non-Hispanic)	Pop 2020	% 2020
White alone (NH)	129	90.21%
Black or African American alone (NH)	0	0.00%
Native American or Alaska Native alone (NH)	0	0.00%
Asian alone (NH)	0	0.00%
Native Hawaiian or Pacific Islander alone (NH)	0	0.00%
Other race alone (NH)	0	0.00%
Mixed race or Multiracial (NH)	5	3.50%
Hispanic or Latino (any race)	9	6.29%
Total	143	100.00%

== Education ==
Loving's students are served by the Graham Independent School District.
