= Bob Town, Texas =

Unincorporated community in Texas, USA

Bob Town
- Unincorporated community
- Interactive map of Bob Town
- Country: United States
- State: Texas
- County: Jack County
- Established: 1940

Bob Town is a small unincorporated community located in Jack County, Texas, United States, on Highway 380, 12 miles (19.3 km) southwest of Jacksboro. The community was established in 1940 and was named after its first resident.
