= Lake Bryson =

Lake in Texas

- Location within Texas Location within the United States
- Location: Bryson, Texas
- Coordinates: 33°11′35″N 98°24′11″W
- Type: Reservoir
- Basin countries: United States
- Managing agency: City of Bryson
- Built: 1980
- Surface area: 97 acres (39 ha)
- Average depth: 49 foot (15 m)
- Max. depth: 49 feet (15 m)
- Website: Texas PWD
- References: U.S. Geological Survey Geographic Names Information System: Lake Bryson

Lake Bryson is a reservoir located northwest of Bryson, Texas. The lake is controlled by the City of Bryson.
