= Bryson Independent School District =

School district in Texas, United States

Coordinates: 33°09′46″N 98°22′58″W

Location
- Bryson, TX ESC Region 9 USA

District information
- Type: Public
- Grades: Pre-K through 12
- Superintendent: Greg London

Students and staff
- Athletic conference: UIL Class 1A (six-man football member)
- Colors: yellow and blue

Other information
- Mascot: Cowboy
- Website: Bryson ISD

Bryson Independent School District is a public school district based in Bryson, Texas (USA).

Located in Jack County, a small portion of the district extends into Young County.

Bryson ISD has one school, Bryson School, that serves students in grades pre-kindergarten through twelve.

== Academic achievement ==
In 2009, the school district was rated "academically acceptable" by the Texas Education Agency.

== Special programs ==
=== Athletics ===
Bryson High School plays six-man football.

== See also ==
- List of school districts in Texas
