= Texas and Southwestern Cattle Raisers Association =

American cattleman organization

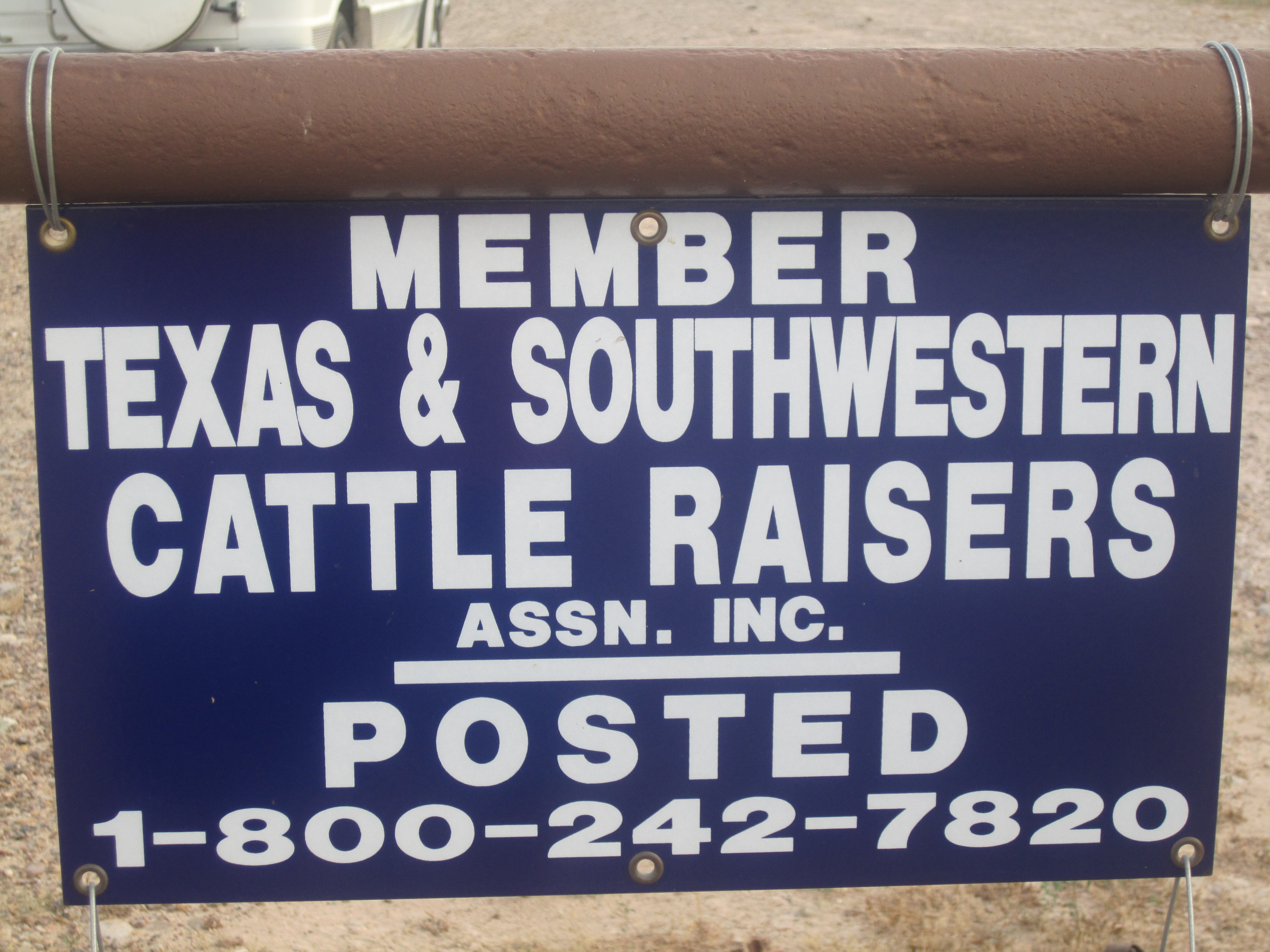
The standard Texas and Southwestern Cattle Raisers Association identification sign; photo taken near the ranch of Gene S. Walker, Sr., in Webb County, Texas.

Texas and Southwestern Cattle Raisers Association, Inc., is an organization established in 1877 by forty Texas cattlemen for the purpose of combating unbridled livestock theft. The association headquarters is located in Fort Worth.

== History ==
The Texas and Southwestern Cattle Raisers Association was founded in Graham by forty ranchers from Palo Pinto County, Young County, Parker County, and Shackelford County, including C.C. Slaughter and James C. Loving. Loving was the secretary and later treasurer of the organization until his death in 1902.

More than 135 years later, the association acts as a trade association composed of large and small cattle producers located primarily in Texas and Oklahoma. Other businesses dedicated to the betterment of the industry are also association members. Twenty-nine livestock theft investigators or "special rangers" employed by the association have law enforcement authority in Texas and Oklahoma in recovering stolen livestock. TSCRA deals with legislative and regulatory issues, beef quality assurance, and rancher education. The association holds local meetings, an annual convention, and an annual trade show. It publishes a monthly magazine for members, The Cattleman.
