= Joplin, Texas =

- Unincorporated community
- Location within Texas Location within the United States
- Coordinates: 33°05′37″N 97°59′41″W
- Country: United States
- State: Texas
- County: Jack
- Elevation: 1,158 ft (353 m)

Population (2000 est.)
  - Total: 30
- Time zone: UTC-6 (Central (CST))
  - Summer (DST): UTC-5 (CDT)
- Area code: 940
- GNIS feature ID: 1378503

Joplin is an unincorporated farming community in Jack County, Texas, United States. It lies on State Highway 199, ten miles southeast of Jacksboro, and has an estimated population of 30.

== History ==
Joplin was founded in the late 1880s as a community center for local farmers. By 1896, the town had its own school, three churches, a general store, a mill, and a cotton gin. The population of Joplin has never exceeded 100, the closest being the 75 residents reported from 1896 through the early 1940s. Joplin did, at one time, have a post office, which served the area from 1891 through its closure in 1914.
