= Jacksboro High School =

Public school in Texas, United States

Coordinates: 33.229277°N 98.170667°W

Location
- 1400 North Main Street; Jacksboro, Jack County, Texas 76458-2214; United States

Information
- Type: Co-Educational, Public, Secondary
- Motto: One's best is due everyday
- School district: Jacksboro Independent School District
- Principal: Craig Parson
- Teaching staff: 31.53 (FTE)
- Grades: 9-12
- Enrollment: 321 (2024–2025)
- Student to teacher ratio: 10.18
- Colors: Purple; White
- Athletics conference: UIL Class 3A
- Mascot: Tiger
- Website: www.jacksboroisd.net/o/jhs

Jacksboro High School is a 3A high school located in Jacksboro, Texas (USA). It is part of the Jacksboro Independent School District located in central Jack County. In 2011, the school was rated "Academically Acceptable" by the Texas Education Agency.

== Athletics ==
The Jacksboro Tigers compete in the following sports:

Cross Country, Volleyball, Football, Basketball, Golf, Track, Softball & Baseball

=== State Titles ===
- Football -
  - 1962(2A), 1971(2A)
- Boys Golf -
  - 1963(2A), 1965(2A), 1967(2A), 1968(2A), 2005(2A)
- Spirit- (3A) 2020, 2022, 2023
