= Bryson, Texas =

- City
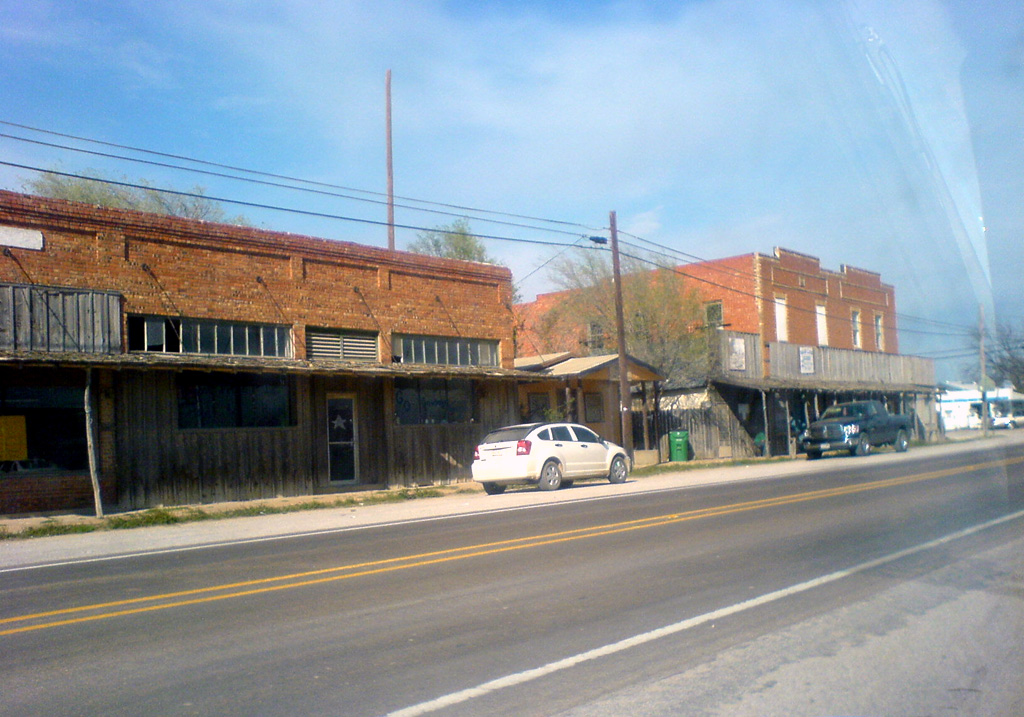
- Downtown Bryson
- Interactive map of Bryson, Texas
- Coordinates: 33°09′50″N 98°23′21″W
- Country: United States
- State: Texas
- County: Jack

Area
  - Total: 1.42 sq mi (3.69 km^{2})
  - Land: 1.32 sq mi (3.41 km^{2})
  - Water: 0.11 sq mi (0.28 km^{2})
- Elevation: 1,257 ft (383 m)

Population (2020)
  - Total: 430
  - Density: 330/sq mi (130/km^{2})
- Time zone: UTC-6 (Central (CST))
  - Summer (DST): UTC-5 (CDT)
- ZIP code: 76427
- Area code: 940
- FIPS code: 48-10960
- GNIS feature ID: 2409928
- Website: cityofbrysontexas.com

Bryson is a city in Jack County, Texas, United States. As of the 2020 census, its population was 430.

== Geography ==
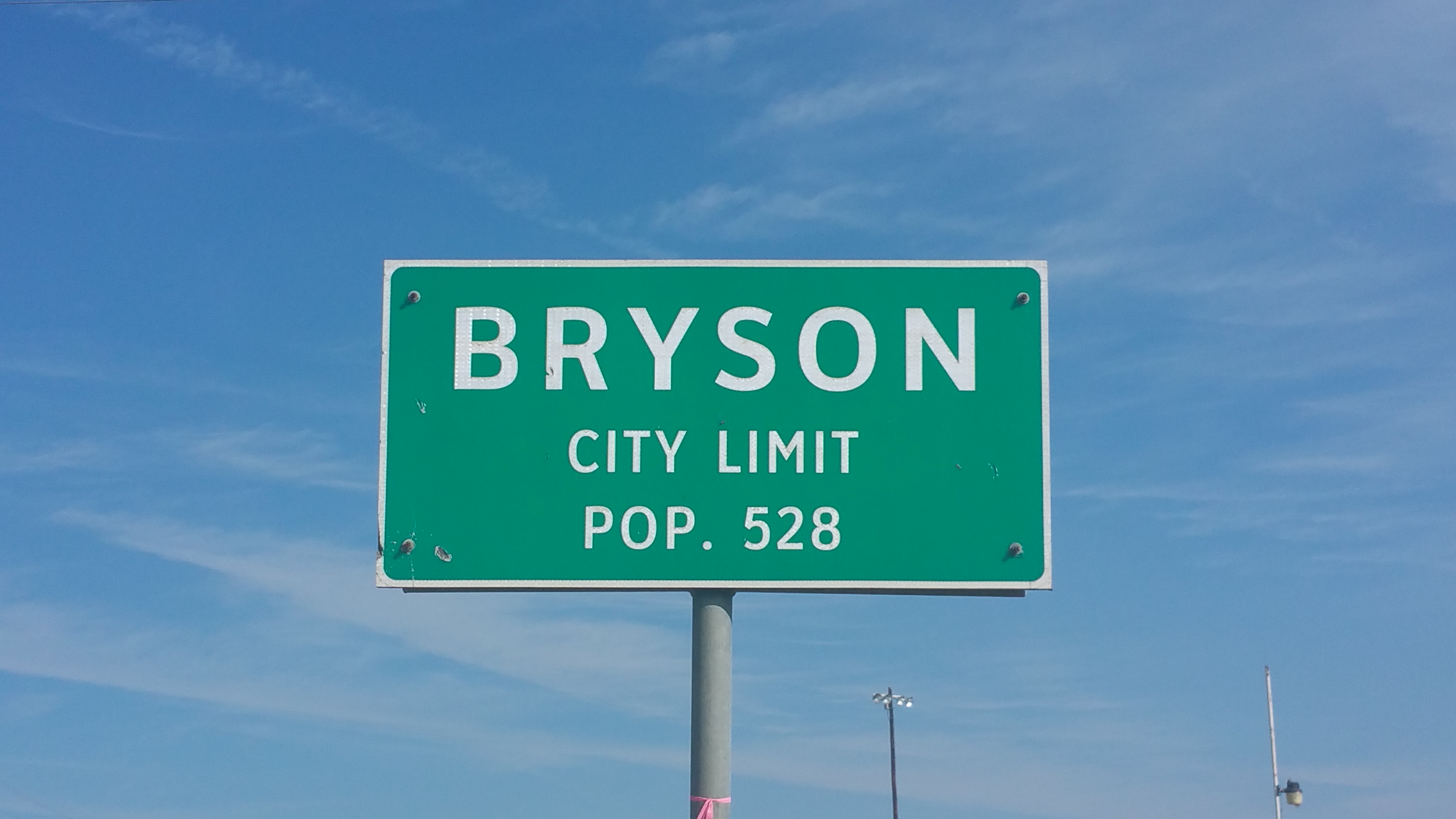
The population sign in 2016

Bryson is located in western Jack County and is situated 14 miles (23 km) southwest of Jacksboro, the county seat, along U.S. Highway 380. US 380 continues southwest 13 miles (21 km) to Graham, the county seat of Young County.

According to the United States Census Bureau, Bryson has a total area of 9,100 acres (3,700 ha), of which 8,400 acres (3,400 ha) are land and 300 ha (741.3 acres), or 7.64%, are water. The water area encompasses Lake Bryson, a reservoir 2.5 miles (4.0 km) northwest of the city. Bryson is in the Rock Creek watershed, flowing south to the Brazos River.

== History ==
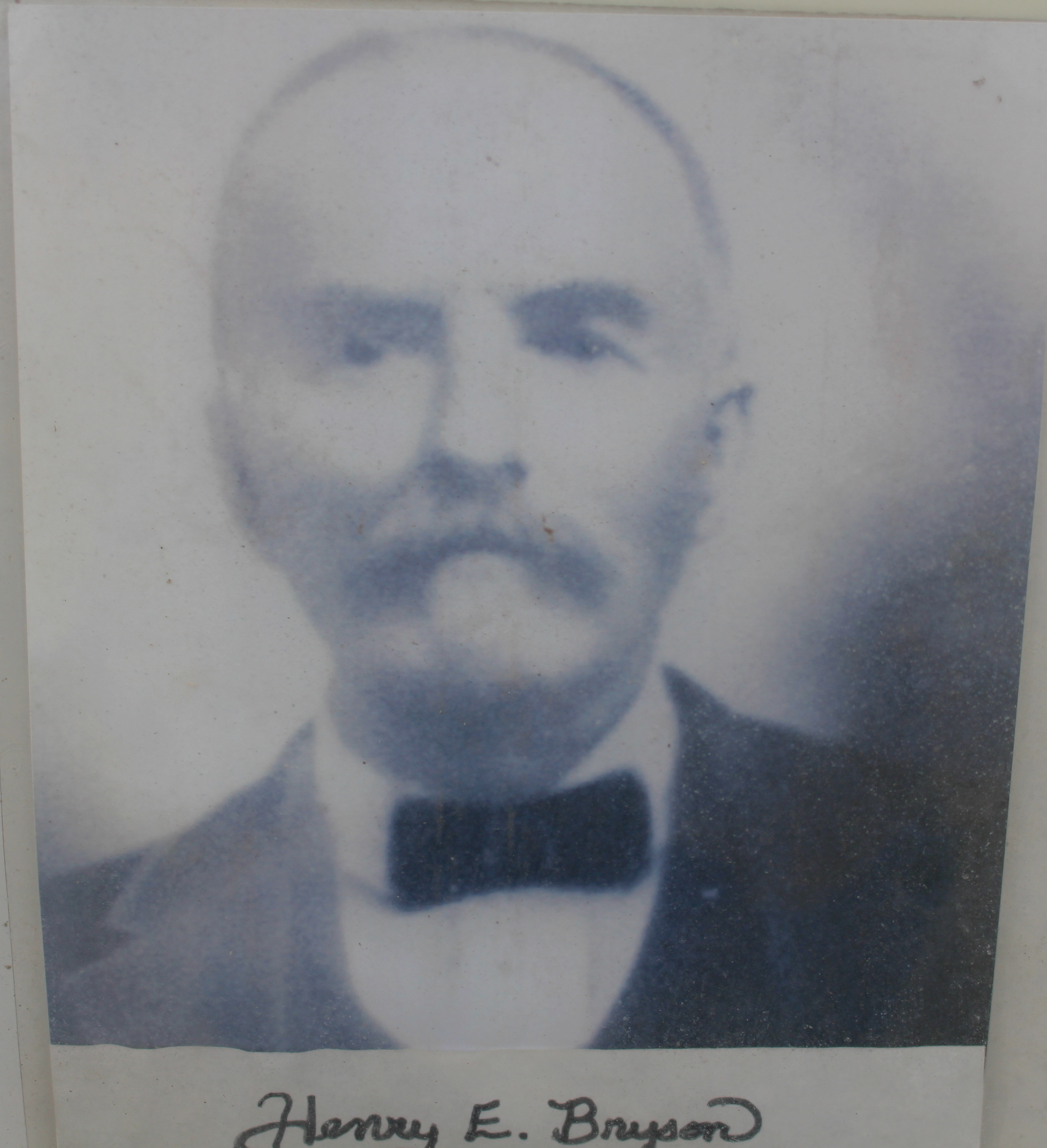
Henry Bryson, the first resident of Bryson

The community was first settled in the late 19th century. Originally known as "Mount Hecla", a post office opened under that name in 1878. Henry Bryson built the area's first residence, a log cabin, that same year. The community was later renamed after him. This change was officially recognized in 1884, when the local post office took the name "Bryson". Mr. Bryson went on to serve as County Commissioner. Early pioneer family names of Bryson were Blount, Chambers, Clayton, Cook, Crumpton, Cullers, Enlow, Epperson, Henderson, Keyser, Kuykendall, McCloud, Moore, Raley, Shanafelt and Vanhooser.

The Chicago, Rock Island and Texas Railway, a subsidiary of the Chicago, Rock Island and Pacific Railroad, reached Bryson in the fall of 1902. Although oil had been discovered in Jack County as early as 1898, it wasn't until the mid-1920s that Bryson became an oil processing center for local producers. The resulting population boom led to the community being known as Jack County's "second city" (after Jacksboro).

On June 6, 1929, the town incorporated a mayor-council form of government. Men who served there include B.B. Bryson, Sam Cullers, L.O. Moore, J.R. Clayton, Willis Williams, and Williard Schlitter. The town had a population of 641 in the 1930 census. A 1938 oil boom in Bryson helped the population explode, with many people forced to live in tents. In 1940, the census dropped back to 806. As oil production declined, so did the population. The low point occurred in 1970, when only 455 people lived within the city limits. During the latter half of the 20th century, Bryson slowly grew to over 500 residents. In 1988, seven businesses were serving the community. Reportedly, 22 businesses were in Bryson as of 2004.

== Demographics ==
Historical population
Census	Pop.	Note	%±
1930	641		—
1940	806		25.7%
1950	588		−27.0%
1960	545		−7.3%
1970	455		−16.5%
1980	579		27.3%
1990	520		−10.2%
2000	528		1.5%
2010	539		2.1%
2020	430		−20.2%
U.S. Decennial Census

=== 2020 census ===
As of the 2020 census, Bryson had a population of 430. The median age was 39.4 years. 24.4% of residents were under the age of 18 and 19.3% of residents were 65 years of age or older. For every 100 females there were 89.4 males, and for every 100 females age 18 and over there were 93.5 males age 18 and over.

There were 180 households in Bryson, of which 40.0% had children under the age of 18 living in them. Of all households, 40.0% were married-couple households, 20.6% were households with a male householder and no spouse or partner present, and 32.8% were households with a female householder and no spouse or partner present. About 33.9% of all households were made up of individuals and 16.6% had someone living alone who was 65 years of age or older.

There were 211 housing units, of which 14.7% were vacant. Among occupied housing units, 54.4% were owner-occupied and 45.6% were renter-occupied. The homeowner vacancy rate was 0.9% and the rental vacancy rate was 10.8%.

0% of residents lived in urban areas, while 100.0% lived in rural areas.

Racial composition as of the 2020 census
Race	Percent
White	93.3%
Black or African American	0.2%
American Indian and Alaska Native	0.7%
Asian	0.5%
Native Hawaiian and Other Pacific Islander	0%
Some other race	0.9%
Two or more races	4.4%
Hispanic or Latino (of any race)	10.0%

=== 2000 census ===
As of the census of 2000, 528 people, 222 households, and 146 families were residing in the city. The population density was 426.0 people/sq mi (164.4/km^{2}). The 261 housing units averaged 210.6/sq mi (81.3/km^{2}). The racial makeup of the city was 93.75% White, 0.76% African American, 2.27% Native American, 0.38% Asian, 0.19% from other races, and 2.65% from two or more races. Hispanics or Latinos of any race were 1.70% of the population.

There were 222 households, out of which 31.1% had children under the age of 18 living with them, 53.2% were married couples living together, 9.5% had a female householder with no husband present, and 33.8% were non-families. 30.6% of all households were made up of individuals, and 14.9% had someone living alone who was 65 years of age or older. The average household size was 2.38 and the average family size was 2.98.

In the city, the population was spread out, with 26.5% under the age of 18, 7.8% from 18 to 24, 27.1% from 25 to 44, 22.7% from 45 to 64, and 15.9% who were 65 years of age or older. The median age was 38 years. For every 100 females, there were 92.7 males. For every 100 females age 18 and over, there were 86.5 males.

The median income for a household in the city was $26,071, and the median income for a family was $30,588. Males had a median income of $27,083 versus $20,114 for females. The per capita income for the city was $13,264. About 12.3% of families and 17.4% of the population were below the poverty line, including 15.9% of those under age 18 and 26.5% of those age 65 or over.

== Education ==
The city is served by the Bryson Independent School District.

In 1875, the first school was started at a log cabin and was named "Cottonwood". As its population grew, its log cabin school was replaced with a frame building, which was later replaced by a two-story building. In 1885, the school was renamed "Bryson Academy" with two new instructors named J.T. Lippard, and C.B Hickman. In 1905, the two-story frame was turned into a brick structure for elementary and high school. In 1938, the school built a gym. Later, a new high school was built and the old brick building was turned into an AG shop. In 1957, a new elementary school building was built. In 2012, the old school was razed and a new school was raised.

== Gallery ==
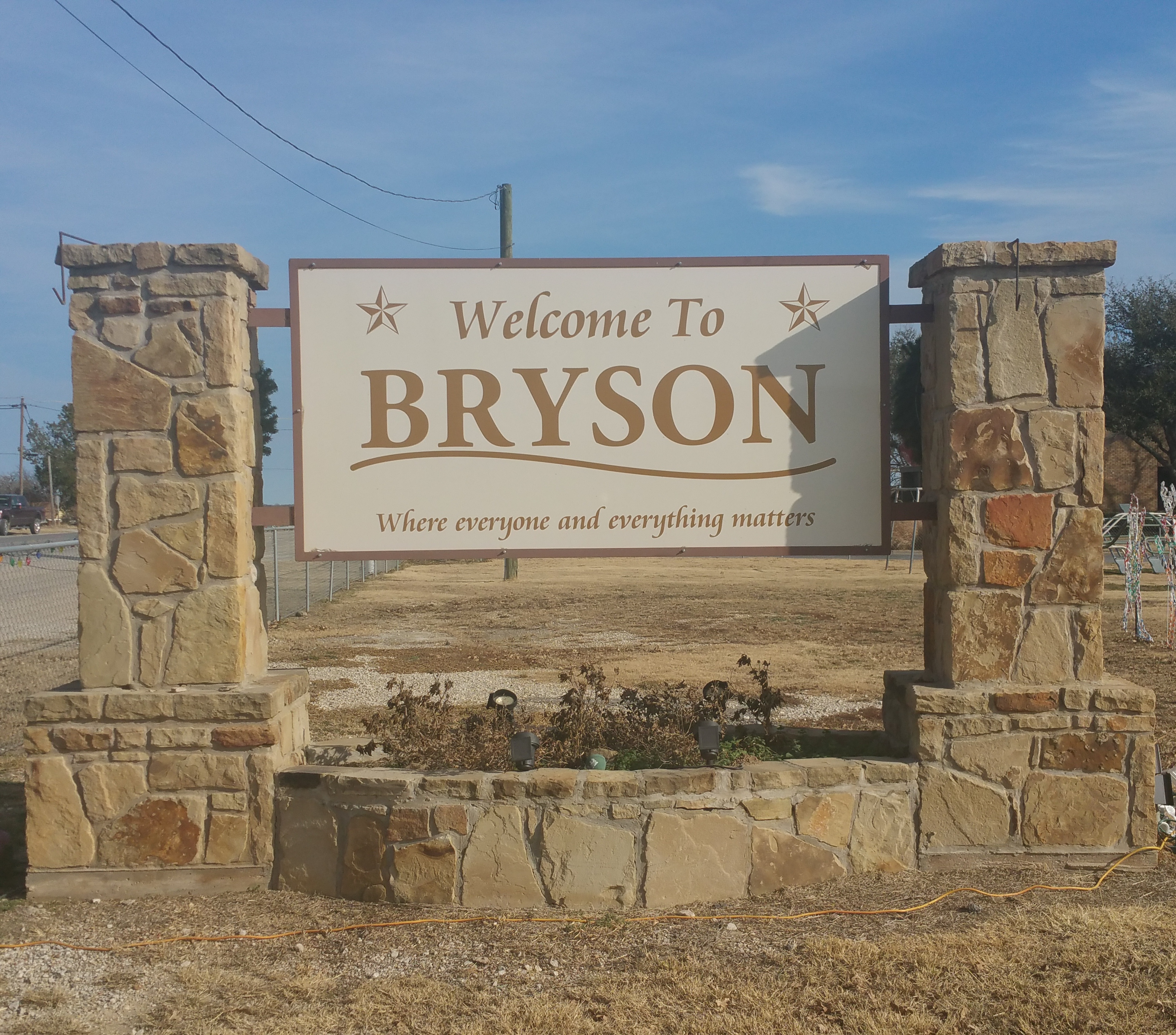
The sign in City Park

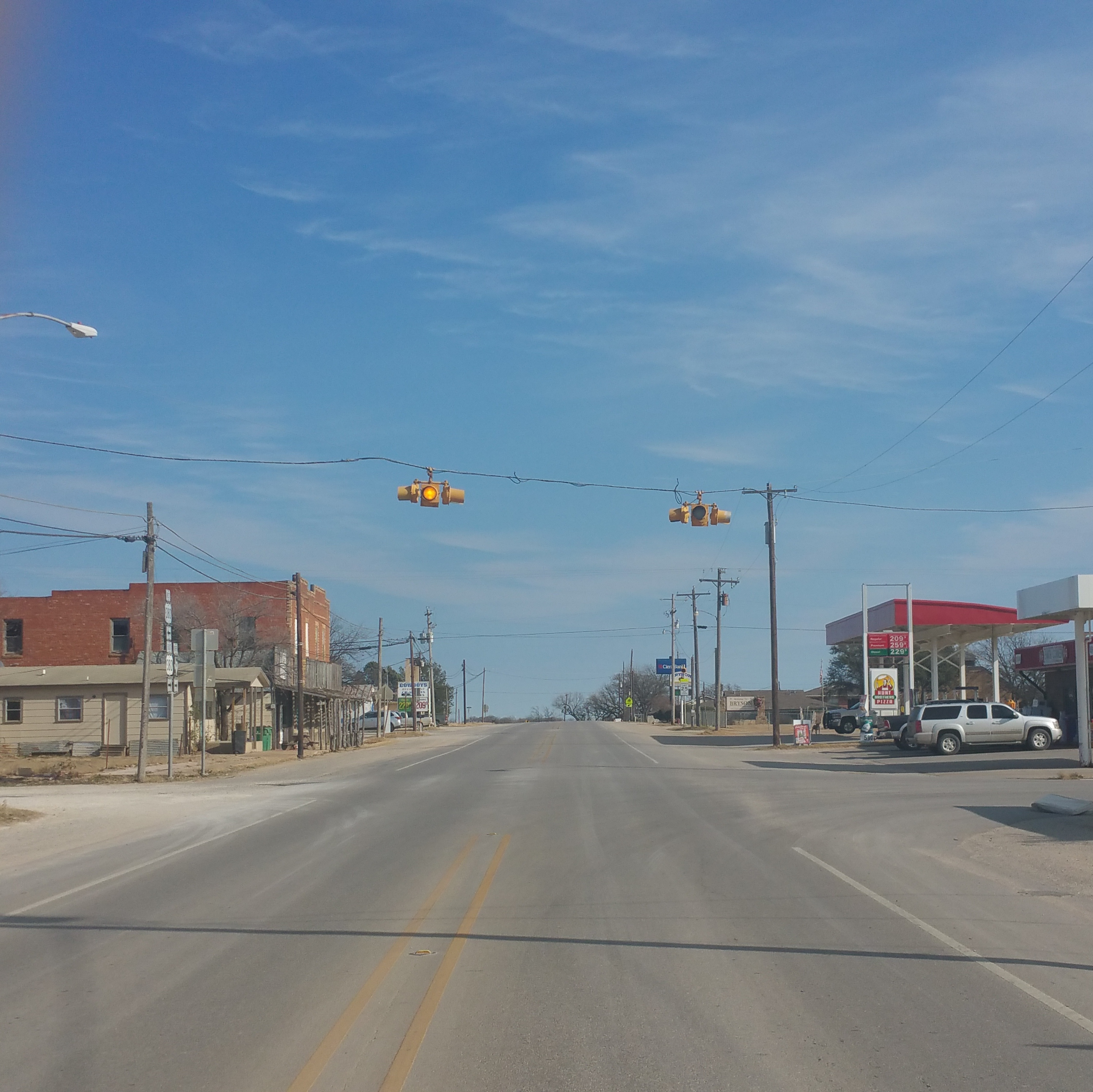
The only traffic light in Bryson

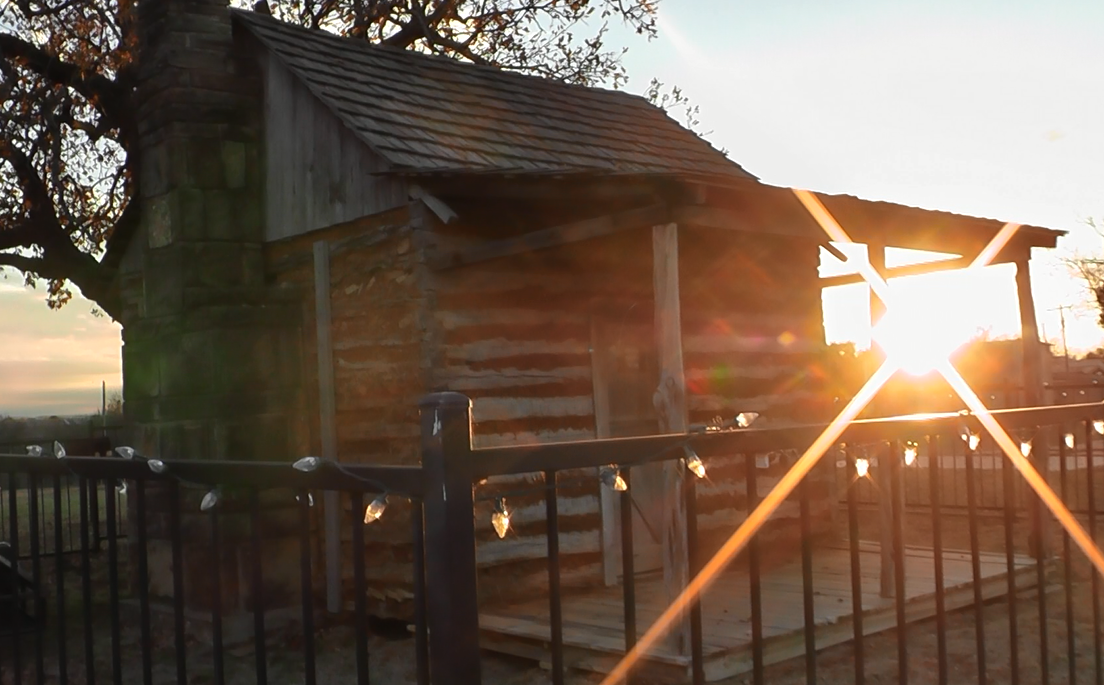
The Henry Bryson Log Cabin

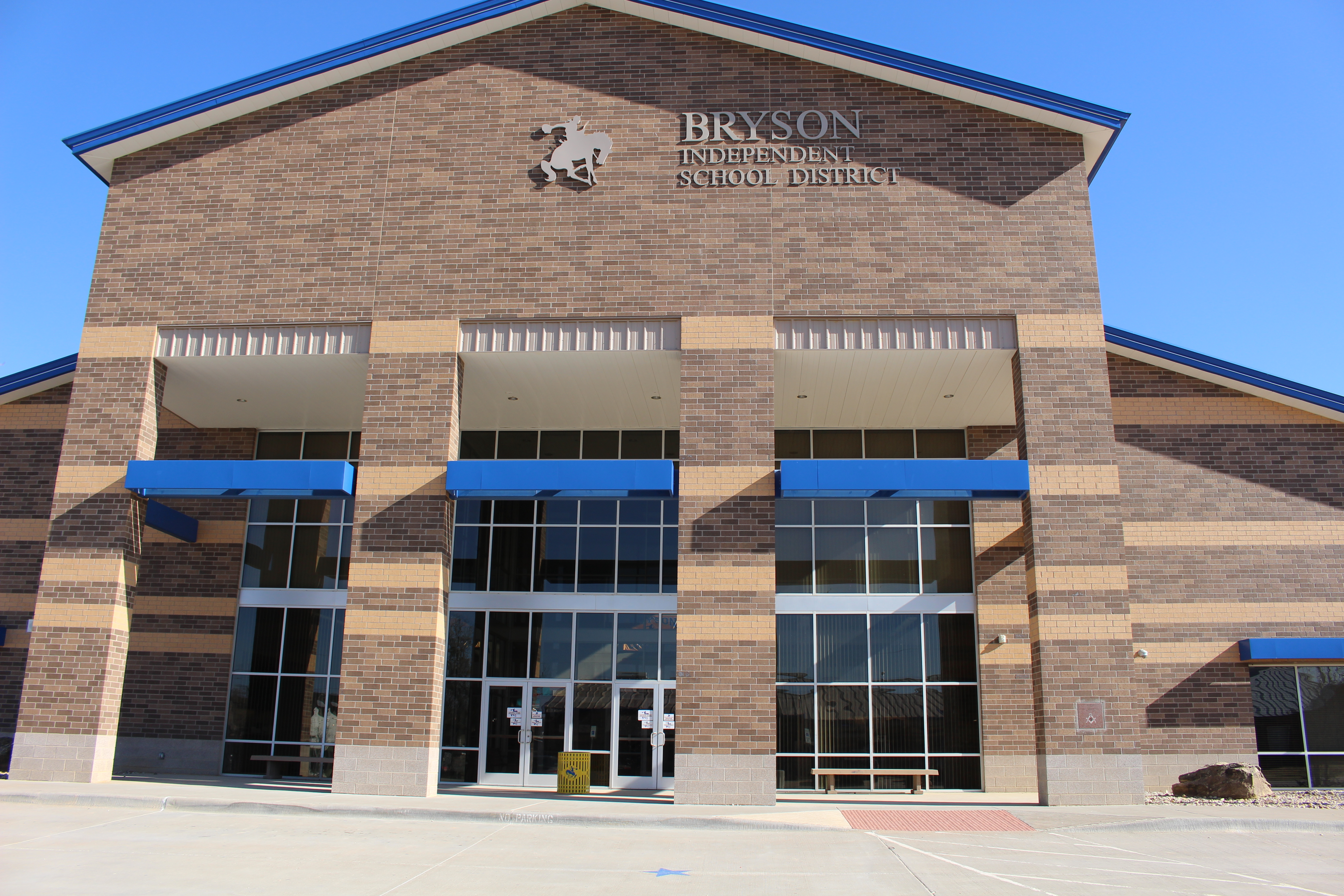
Bryson school built in 2012
