= Wizard Wells, Texas =

Wizard Wells
- Unincorporated community
- Location within Texas Location within the United States
- Coordinates: 33°12′01″N 97°58′16″W
- Country: United States
- State: Texas
- County: Jack
- Elevation: 1,158 ft (353 m)

Population (2000 est.)
  - Total: 69
- Time zone: UTC-6 (Central (CST))
  - Summer (DST): UTC-5 (CDT)
- ZIP codes: 76458
- Area code: 940
- GNIS feature ID: 1350445

Wizard Wells is an unincorporated farming community in Jack County, Texas, United States. According to the Handbook of Texas, the community had a population of 69 in 2000.

== History ==
Because a man named G. W. Vineyard controlled a large portion of the land, the settlement was formerly known as Old Vineyard. According to legend, Vineyard found that the spring waters on his property healed the sores on his legs in the 1880s. The settlers called the burgeoning settlement Wizard Wells due to the purported miraculous healing. Wizard Wells has long been a hub for the local farming community and a place to shop. Between 1920 and 1940, the town's population was approximately 175 people. The population of Wizard Wells began to gradually drop in the 1950s. The projected population of the village was 69 in 1986 and remained that way until 2000.

Butterfield Overland Mail had a stage stand in the community.

== Geography ==
Wizard Wells is located on Farm to Market Road 1156, 13 mi (21 km) east of Jacksboro in east-central Jack County.

== Education ==
Today, the community is served by the Jacksboro Independent School District.
