= Jacksboro Independent School District =

School district in Texas

Jacksboro Independent School District is a public school district based in Jacksboro, Texas (USA).

Located in Jack County, small portions of the district extend into Wise and Archer counties.

In 2009, the school district was rated "academically acceptable" by the Texas Education Agency.

== Schools ==
- Jacksboro High School (Grades 9-12)
  - 1962 and 1971 Class 2A State Football Champions
- Jacksboro Junior High School (Grades 7-8)
- Jacksboro Middle School (Grades 4-6)
- Jacksboro Elementary School (Grades PK-3)
