= Jack County, Texas =

County in Texas, United States

- County
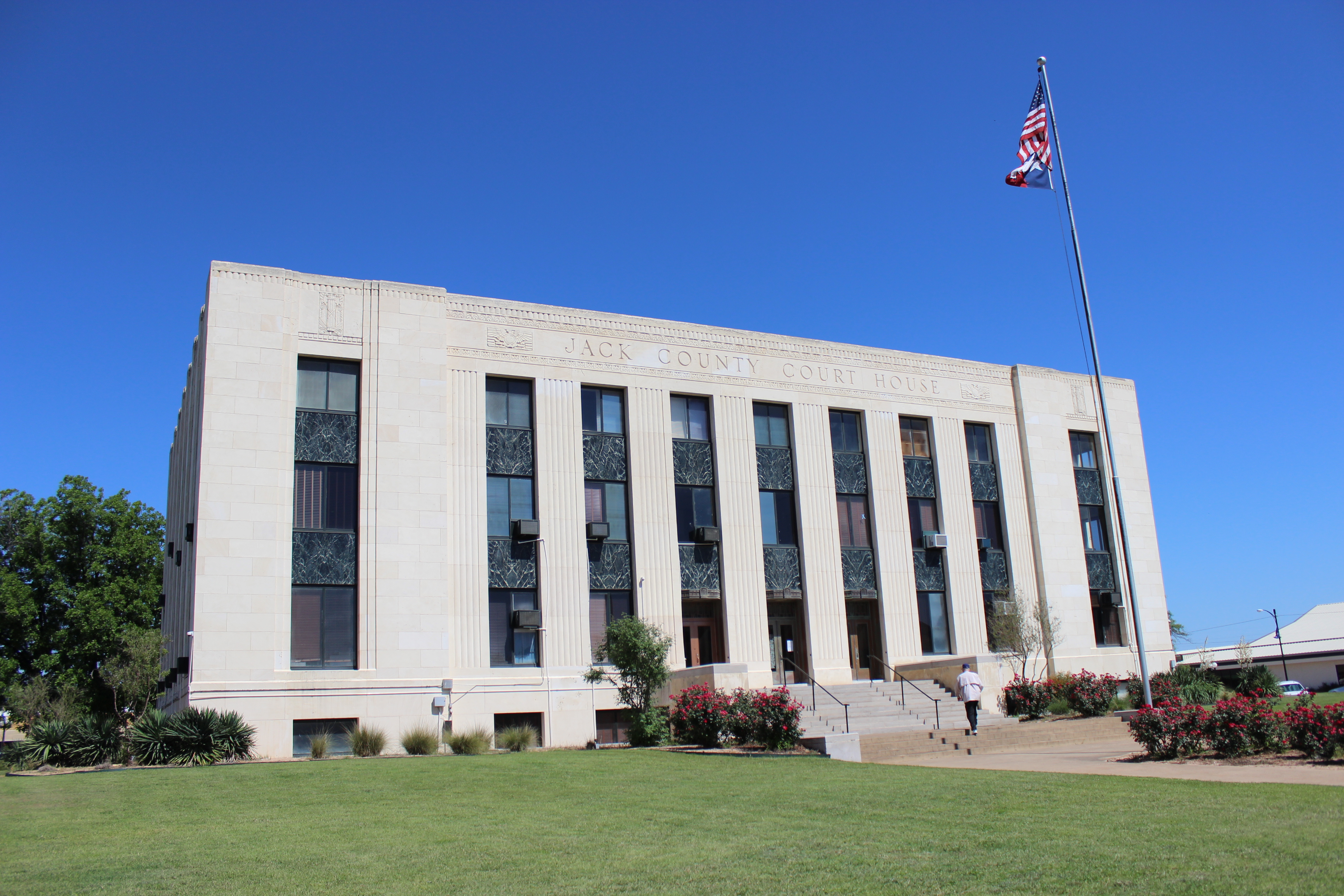
- The Jack County Courthouse in Jacksboro

- Location within the U.S. state of Texas
- Coordinates: 33°14′N 98°11′W
- Country: United States
- State: Texas
- Founded: 1857
- Seat: Jacksboro
- Largest city: Jacksboro

Area
  - Total: 920 sq mi (2,400 km^{2})
  - Land: 911 sq mi (2,360 km^{2})
  - Water: 9.5 sq mi (25 km^{2}) 1.0%

Population (2020)
  - Total: 8,472
  - Estimate (2025): 9,563 ▲
  - Density: 9.30/sq mi (3.59/km^{2})
- Time zone: UTC−6 (Central)
  - Summer (DST): UTC−5 (CDT)
- Congressional district: 25th
- Website: www.jackcounty.texas.gov

Jack County is a county located in the north-central part of the U.S. state of Texas. As of the 2020 census, its population was 8,472. Its county seat is Jacksboro. The county was created in 1856 and organized the next year. It is named for Patrick Churchill Jack and his brother William Houston Jack, both soldiers of the Texas Revolution.

== Geography ==
According to the U.S. Census Bureau, the county has a total area of 920 sq mi (2,400 km^{2}), of which 911 sq mi (2,360 km^{2}) are land and 9.5 sq mi (25 km^{2}) (1.0%) are covered by water.

=== Major highways ===
- U.S. Highway 281
- U.S. Highway 380
- State Highway 59
- State Highway 114
- State Highway 148
- State Highway 199
- Loop 187

=== Adjacent counties ===
- Clay County (north)
- Montague County (northeast)
- Wise County (east)
- Parker County (southeast)
- Palo Pinto County (south)
- Young County (west)
- Archer County (northwest)

== Demographics ==
Historical population
| Census | Pop. | Note | %± |
|---|---|---|---|
| 1860 | 1,000 | | — |
| 1870 | 694 | | −30.6% |
| 1880 | 6,626 | | 854.8% |
| 1890 | 9,740 | | 47.0% |
| 1900 | 10,224 | | 5.0% |
| 1910 | 11,817 | | 15.6% |
| 1920 | 9,863 | | −16.5% |
| 1930 | 9,046 | | −8.3% |
| 1940 | 10,206 | | 12.8% |
| 1950 | 7,755 | | −24.0% |
| 1960 | 7,418 | | −4.3% |
| 1970 | 6,711 | | −9.5% |
| 1980 | 7,408 | | 10.4% |
| 1990 | 6,981 | | −5.8% |
| 2000 | 8,763 | | 25.5% |
| 2010 | 9,044 | | 3.2% |
| 2020 | 8,472 | | −6.3% |
| 2025 (est.) | 9,563 | ▲ | 12.9% |
U.S. Decennial Census; 1850–2010 2010 2020

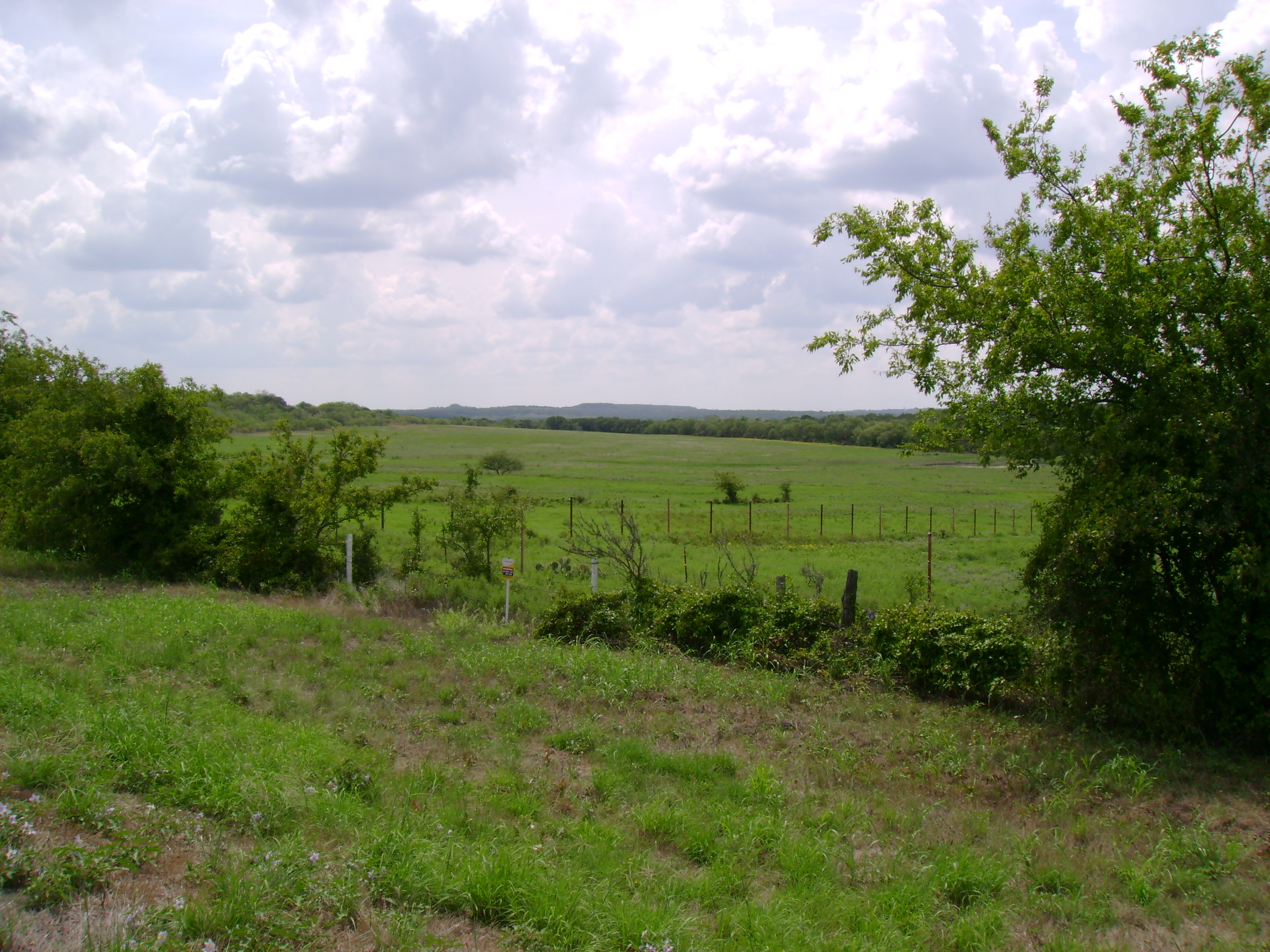
A scene typical of the mixed pastures and wooded hills of eastern Jack County

=== Racial and ethnic composition ===
Jack County, Texas – Racial and ethnic composition Note: the US Census treats Hispanic/Latino as an ethnic category. This table excludes Latinos from the racial categories and assigns them to a separate category. Hispanics/Latinos may be of any race.
| Race / Ethnicity (NH = Non-Hispanic) | Pop 1980 | Pop 1990 | Pop 2000 | Pop 2010 | Pop 2020 | % 1980 | % 1990 | % 2000 | % 2010 | % 2020 |
|---|---|---|---|---|---|---|---|---|---|---|
| White alone (NH) | 7,184 | 6,668 | 7,468 | 7,289 | 6,358 | 96.98% | 95.52% | 85.22% | 80.59% | 75.05% |
| Black or African American alone (NH) | 71 | 51 | 481 | 340 | 294 | 0.96% | 0.73% | 5.49% | 3.76% | 3.47% |
| Native American or Alaska Native alone (NH) | 33 | 18 | 48 | 38 | 35 | 0.45% | 0.26% | 0.55% | 0.42% | 0.41% |
| Asian alone (NH) | 13 | 10 | 24 | 30 | 41 | 0.18% | 0.14% | 0.27% | 0.33% | 0.48% |
| Native Hawaiian or Pacific Islander alone (NH) | x | x | 1 | 3 | 5 | x | x | 0.01% | 0.03% | 0.06% |
| Other race alone (NH) | 10 | 2 | 1 | 6 | 9 | 0.13% | 0.03% | 0.01% | 0.07% | 0.11% |
| Multiracial (NH) | x | x | 49 | 55 | 209 | x | x | 0.56% | 0.61% | 2.47% |
| Hispanic or Latino (any race) | 97 | 232 | 691 | 1,283 | 1,521 | 1.31% | 3.32% | 7.89% | 14.19% | 17.95% |
| Total | 7,408 | 6,981 | 8,763 | 9,044 | 8,472 | 100.00% | 100.00% | 100.00% | 100.00% | 100.00% |

=== 2020 census ===
As of the 2020 census, the county had a population of 8,472. The median age was 40.1 years; 21.5% of residents were under 18 and 17.5% were 65 or older. For every 100 females, there were 125.1 males, and for every 100 females 18 and over, there were 130.2 males 18 and over.

The racial makeup of the county was 78.6% White, 3.7% Black or African American, 0.8% American Indian and Alaska Native, 0.5% Asian, 0.1% Native Hawaiian and Pacific Islander, 9.2% from some other race, and 7.1% from two or more races. Hispanic or Latino residents of any race comprised 18.0% of the population.

Less than 0.1% of residents lived in urban areas, while the rest lived in rural areas.

Of the 2,950 households in the county, 31.2% had children under 18 living with them, 52.9% were married-couple households, 18.6% were households with a male householder and no spouse or partner present, and 23.8% were households with a female householder and no spouse or partner present. About 27.4% of all households were made up of individuals, and 13.3% had someone living alone who was 65 or older.

Of the3,785 housing units, 22.1% were vacant. Among occupied housing units, 77.2% were owner-occupied and 22.8% were renter-occupied. The homeowner vacancy rate was 2.1% and the rental vacancy rate was 15.8%.

=== 2010 census ===
As of the 2010 census, about 4.1 same-sex couples per 1,000 households were in the county.

=== 2000 census ===
As of the 2000 census, 8,763 people, 3,047 households, and 2,227 families were residing in Jack County. The population density was 10 people/mi^{2} (3.9 people/km^{2}). The 3,668 housing units averaged 4 per square mile (1.5/km^{2}). The racial makeup of the county was 88.68% White, 5.55% African American, 0.67% Native American, 0.27% Asian, 3.85% from other races, and 0.97% from two or more races. About 7.89% of the population were Hispanics or Latinos of any race.

Of the 3,047 households, 32.7% had children under 18 living with them, 60.3% were married couples living together, 9.2% had a female householder with no husband present, and 26.9% were not families. About 24.5% of all households were made up of individuals, and 12.8% had someone living alone who was 65 or older. The average household size was 2.52, and the average family size was 2.99.

In the county, the age distribution was 23.4% under 18, 10.0% from 18 to 24, 29.8% from 25 to 44, 21.6% from 45 to 64, and 15.2% who were 65 or older. The median age was 37 years. For every 100 females, there were 120.4 males. For every 100 females 18 and over, there were 126.2 males.

The median income in the county for a household was $32,500 and for a family was $37,323. Males had a median income of $28,838 versus $20,216 for females. The per capita income for the county was $15,210. About 10.1% of families and 12.9% of the population were below the poverty line, including 13.9% of those under 18 and 13.7% of those 65 or over.

== Economy ==
The county is dominated by agriculture (mostly ranching), which has kept population density low. The extensive mechanization of agriculture has resulted in large farms and few workers.

The $200 million, 110 MW Keechi wind farm project with Enbridge, financed via a 20-year agreement with Microsoft, was announced in 2014. Keechi Wind generated 103.4 GWh during the three-month period between September and December 2024.

== Communities ==
=== Cities ===
- Bryson
- Jacksboro (county seat)

=== Census-designated place ===
- Perrin

=== Unincorporated communities ===
- Antelope
- Cundiff
- Jermyn
- Maryetta
- Newport (also in Clay County)
- Postoak
- Vineyard
- Wizard Wells

=== Ghost towns ===
- Barton's Chapel
- Bob Town
- Gibtown
- Joplin
- Senate
- Truce
- Westbrook

== Notable people ==
- Frank Shelby Groner (1877-1943) was county attorney and later president of the College of Marshall.
- Edith Wilmans, first woman elected to the Texas State Legislature, lived near Vineyard, in Jack County, for some years after leaving office; she raised goats and cattle on her farm, and was a practicing lawyer.

== Politics ==
Prior to 1952, Jack County was solidly Democratic in presidential elections in similar fashion to almost all of Texas and the Solid South. From 1952 to 1996, the county was a swing county, though became somewhat of a bellwether earlier, voting for the national winner in all presidential elections from 1928 to 2004 except for 1960, 1968, and 1996. From 2000 on, the county has become a Republican Party stronghold, with its presidential candidates winning by increasing margins in each passing election. As a testament to how strongly Republican the county has swung, Donald Trump defeated Hillary Clinton by a margin of 79.4% in 2016, compared to an only 6.7% margin Bob Dole won the county by 20 years prior at the start of its Republican trend.

Jack County is located within District 68 of the Texas House of Representatives and District 30 of the Texas Senate.

United States presidential election results for Jack County, Texas
| Year | Republican | | Democratic | | Third party(ies) | |
| Year | No. | % | No. | % | No. | % |
|---|---|---|---|---|---|---|
| 1912 | 85 | 7.35% | 755 | 65.25% | 317 | 27.40% |
| 1916 | 121 | 10.98% | 862 | 78.22% | 119 | 10.80% |
| 1920 | 253 | 28.72% | 566 | 64.25% | 62 | 7.04% |
| 1924 | 290 | 19.73% | 1,154 | 78.50% | 26 | 1.77% |
| 1928 | 1,068 | 70.22% | 450 | 29.59% | 3 | 0.20% |
| 1932 | 189 | 11.57% | 1,429 | 87.45% | 16 | 0.98% |
| 1936 | 183 | 14.01% | 1,113 | 85.22% | 10 | 0.77% |
| 1940 | 305 | 12.97% | 2,046 | 86.99% | 1 | 0.04% |
| 1944 | 217 | 11.05% | 1,484 | 75.56% | 263 | 13.39% |
| 1948 | 265 | 14.58% | 1,426 | 78.48% | 126 | 6.93% |
| 1952 | 1,406 | 55.38% | 1,130 | 44.51% | 3 | 0.12% |
| 1956 | 1,327 | 56.54% | 997 | 42.48% | 23 | 0.98% |
| 1960 | 1,342 | 55.18% | 1,079 | 44.37% | 11 | 0.45% |
| 1964 | 847 | 34.66% | 1,594 | 65.22% | 3 | 0.12% |
| 1968 | 966 | 37.00% | 1,133 | 43.39% | 512 | 19.61% |
| 1972 | 1,719 | 68.57% | 775 | 30.91% | 13 | 0.52% |
| 1976 | 1,049 | 36.54% | 1,814 | 63.18% | 8 | 0.28% |
| 1980 | 1,482 | 51.51% | 1,349 | 46.89% | 46 | 1.60% |
| 1984 | 1,825 | 65.67% | 945 | 34.01% | 9 | 0.32% |
| 1988 | 1,542 | 50.16% | 1,521 | 49.48% | 11 | 0.36% |
| 1992 | 1,041 | 31.10% | 1,254 | 37.47% | 1,052 | 31.43% |
| 1996 | 1,162 | 46.72% | 1,019 | 40.97% | 306 | 12.30% |
| 2000 | 2,107 | 70.85% | 822 | 27.64% | 45 | 1.51% |
| 2004 | 2,470 | 79.01% | 643 | 20.57% | 13 | 0.42% |
| 2008 | 2,528 | 83.63% | 470 | 15.55% | 25 | 0.83% |
| 2012 | 2,580 | 88.72% | 303 | 10.42% | 25 | 0.86% |
| 2016 | 2,973 | 88.75% | 314 | 9.37% | 63 | 1.88% |
| 2020 | 3,418 | 90.38% | 331 | 8.75% | 33 | 0.87% |
| 2024 | 3,819 | 90.91% | 363 | 8.64% | 19 | 0.45% |

United States Senate election results for Jack County, Texas1
| Year | Republican | | Democratic | | Third party(ies) | |
| Year | No. | % | No. | % | No. | % |
|---|---|---|---|---|---|---|
| 2024 | 3,689 | 88.23% | 427 | 10.21% | 65 | 1.55% |

United States Senate election results for Jack County, Texas2
| Year | Republican | | Democratic | | Third party(ies) | |
| Year | No. | % | No. | % | No. | % |
|---|---|---|---|---|---|---|
| 2020 | 3,322 | 89.83% | 319 | 8.63% | 57 | 1.54% |

Texas Gubernatorial election results for Jack County
| Year | Republican | | Democratic | | Third party(ies) | |
| Year | No. | % | No. | % | No. | % |
|---|---|---|---|---|---|---|
| 2022 | 2,744 | 91.68% | 227 | 7.58% | 22 | 0.74% |

== See also ==
- List of museums in North Texas
- National Register of Historic Places listings in Jack County, Texas
- Recorded Texas Historic Landmarks in Jack County
