= North Point Worship =

American contemporary worship music band

North Point Worship Band
- Origin: Alpharetta, Georgia
- Genres: Worship; CCM; Christian alternative rock
- Years active: 2012–present
- Labels: North Point Music, Centricity Music
- Members: Sean Curran; Lauren Lee Anderson; Clay Finnesand; Heath Balltzglier; Brandon Coker; Kaycee Hines Coyle; Alex Thompson; Chad Russell; Megan Jiles; Tianna Bowles; Jared Hamilton
- Past members: Steve Marcia; Chris Cauley; Desi Raines; Brett Stanfill; Emily Harrison; Matt Adkins; Seth Condrey; Eddie Kirkland; Lauren Daigle; Adam Kersh; Paul Taylor Smith; Steve Fee

North Point Worship, formerly known as North Point InsideOut, is an American contemporary worship music band from Alpharetta, Georgia. Their group formed at North Point Community Church in 2012, a non-denominational congregation, a church established by Pastor Andy Stanley. The group released, No One Higher in 2012 and Hear in 2015 with North Point Music. Nothing Ordinary: Part 1 released in June 2017 and Nothing Ordinary: Part 2 released in October 2017 were recorded with Centricity Music. Two of those albums both charted on the Billboard magazine charts, with the Hear album placing on the Billboard 200 chart. The group is best known for their 2015 hit "Death Was Arrested" featuring Seth Condrey. It peaked at No. 6 on the Billboard Christian Digital Song Sales for four consecutive weeks.

== Background ==
North Point Worship started as a musical entity in 2012, with their first album, No One Higher, that was released in 2012. This album was their breakthrough release on the Billboard magazine charts, where it peaked at No. 20 on the Christian Albums and No. 19 on the Heatseekers Albums charts. Their subsequent album, Hear, was released in 2015, by North Point Music, where this peaked on the Billboard 200 at No. 193 and on the Christian Albums at No. 2. The album was placed at No. 1 on the Worship Leader Top 5 Community Funded/Indie Releases of 2015 list, and the song, "Trust It All", was placed at No. 11 on their Top 20 Songs of 2015 list. North Point InsideOut recorded their third album at Infinite Energy Arena in Gwinnett County, Atlanta, on March 26. They signed a deal with Centricity Music to digitally release their Nothing Ordinary EP on April 7, 2017.

They recorded seven new singles in April 2018: "Unshakable Love", "On My Way Back Home", "Not the Same", "Changed", "All the World", "By My Side" and "Wide Open". They released their fourth studio album, North Point InsideOut, on November 16, 2018. "Here I Am", was released on June 21, 2019.

In 2020, North Point InsideOut renamed itself North Point Worship and announced its intention of releasing 12 new songs that year.

== Discography ==
=== Live Albums ===
List of albums, with selected chart positions
Title	Album details	Peak chart positions		
Title	Album details	US	US Christ.	US Heat
No One Higher	Released: September 18, 2012; Label: North Point; CD, digital download	—	20	19
Hear	Released: June 9, 2015; Label: North Point; CD, digital download	193	2	—

=== Extended plays ===
List of extended plays, with selected chart positions
Title	Album details	Peak chart positions		
Title	Album details	US	US Christ.	US Heat
Nothing Ordinary	Released: April 7, 2017; Label: Centricity Music; CD, digital download	—	—	—
Ring the Bells	Released: November 16, 2018; Label: Centricity Music; CD, digital download	—	—	—
North Point InsideOut	Released: November 16, 2018; Label: Centricity Music; CD, digital download	—	—	—
Abundantly More	Releasing: August 30, 2019; Label: Centricity Music; CD, digital download	—	—	—

=== Singles ===
Year	Single	Chart positions			Certifications	Album
Year	Single	US Christ	US Christ Air.	US Christ. Digital	Certifications	Album
2015	"Death Was Arrested" (featuring Seth Condrey)	12	17	6	RIAA: Gold	Nothing Ordinary (EP)
2018	"Every Beat" (featuring Seth Condrey)	—	29	—		Nothing Ordinary (EP)
2018	"Emmanuel (Hope of Heaven)" (featuring Seth Condrey)	44	32	—		Ring the Bells (EP)
2019	"Anchor of Peace" (featuring Desi Raines)	—	—	—		Abundantly More (EP)
2019	"Here I Am" (featuring Kaycee Hines)	—	—	—		Abundantly More (EP)
2019	"Mucho Mas" (featuring Seth Condrey)	—	—	—		Non-album singles
2020	"Sons and Daughters" (featuring Brett Stanfill and Lauren Lee)	—	—	—		Find a Reason
2022	"Deliverer"	—	—	—		Non-album singles
2022	"In Jesus Name (God of Possible)" (with Katy Nichole)	—	—	—		Non-album singles
2022	"This Is My Song" (with Mac Powell and Heath Balltzglier)	—	—	—		Non-album singles

== InsideOut ministry ==
The InsideOut ministry is the high school department of North Point Ministries. Thousands of high school students in the metro Atlanta area come to North Point's eight locations on Sunday nights – Browns Bridge Church, Buckhead Church, Decatur City Church, East Cobb Church, Gwinnett Church, Hamilton Mill Church, North Point Community Church, and Woodstock City Church. Every Sunday, along with church music, students listen to their campuses' pastor, go to small group, and later eat dinner with their friends. InsideOut also has several student retreats every year. The North Point Worship band gets to share new songs with students every retreat.
