= Condrey =

Condrey is a surname. Notable people with the surname include:

- Clay Condrey (born 1975), American baseball player
- Dennis Condrey (1952–2026), American wrestler
- Fred Condrey (1883–1952), Welsh footballer
- Seth Condrey (born 1983), American Christian musician
