= MedShare =

U.S. non-profit organization

- Formation: 1998
- Tax ID no.: 58-2433968
- Headquarters: Decatur, Georgia
- CEO and President: Charles Redding
- Chief Financial Officer: Tonya Ware
- Website: https://www.medshare.org/

MedShare is a national non-profit organization that recovers surplus medical supplies and equipment from U.S. hospitals and manufacturers and redistributes them to needy hospitals in developing countries. They process these donated materials and make them available to under-served hospitals and clinics in two ways: direct shipments to international applicant institutions and supplying medical mission teams with commonly needed medical items.

Its national headquarters and Southeastern distribution center is in Decatur, Georgia, and its Western Region distribution center is in San Leandro, California. In 14 years of service, they have shipped over 750 forty-foot shipping containers of medical supplies and equipment valued at more than $100 million to needy health facilities in 88 countries around the world.

== History ==
MedShare was founded in 1998 by A.B. Short, a nonprofit entrepreneur, and Bob Freeman, a retired businessman. Short and Freeman were concerned by the environmental impact of hospitals and medical companies discarding thousands of tons of medical supplies and equipment, while under-served hospitals in developing countries were in need of the most basic medical items.

Short and Freeman met with hospitals and medical professionals, and during these meetings, not one hospital turned their medical surplus collection program down.

MedShare employ a technology-based inventory system, where the qualified health recipient can custom-order the medical items for their shipment. This custom-order system further reduces wastage.

- 1999 – MedShare shipped their first 40-foot shipping container of medical supplies to Costa Rica.
- 2000 – Woodruff Foundation awards their first major $250,000 grant
- 2002 – MedShare's medical shipments increase 50 percent from 15 to 30 medical supply shipments
- 2005 – Move into a larger 50,000-square-foot (4,600 m^{2}) warehouse to accommodate growing donations and operations
- 2006 – Reaches $35 million worth of medical supplies and equipment shipped overseas
- 2007 – Secure a $6.2 million capital campaign to purchase and endow its national headquarters in Decatur, Georgia, upgrade technology and fund a national expansion
- 2008 – Grand opening of the Western Region Distribution Center in San Leandro, California
  - 400th forty-foot container of medical aid shipped abroad
- 2009 – Celebration of 10-year anniversary
  - 500th forty-foot medical aid container shipped
  - 254 medical mission teams supplied with needed medical supplies for short-term medical work abroad
  - Over 10,000 volunteers served at both distribution centers
  - The Coca-Cola Africa Foundation awards MedShare the largest single programs grant of $400,000 for shipping containers to specified hospitals in Africa.
- 2010 – For the first time, MedShare ships over 100 containers of medical supplies in a calendar year.
  - After the devastating earthquake in Haiti, MedShare responds by shipping 28 containers of medical supplies, supplying over 83 medical mission teams, and providing biomedical equipment training.
  - MedShare reaches 500,000 inventoried medical supplies in MedShare online inventory system.
  - MedShare ships its 600th container of medical supplies and equipment.
  - For the second year running, the State of California recognizes MedShare as a recipient of the Waste Reduction Awards Program (WRAP).
  - MedShare enjoys a record fundraising year, increasing total support by more than 30%.
- 2011 -– Surpassed 2 million cubic feet in material saved from landfills.
  - Secured partnership with The Atlantic Philanthropies that will result in substantial container shipments to Viet Nam.
  - Established a New York Regional Council, and explored expansion opportunities in the Mid-Atlantic and South Florida regions.
  - Meridith Rentz appointed CEO and President.

== Organization ==
=== Organizational structure ===
MedShare is a U.S. nonprofit organization with an international mission. Its governing body is the Board of Trustees, which is responsible for the fiduciary, strategic and generative oversight and direction of the organization. There are 19 members of the board, from corporate, community and healthcare industry backgrounds. Board members serve without compensation, and meet once a quarter. The current Chairman of the Board of Trustees is James E. Arnett.

MedShare's national staff consists of 37 people, with 5 executive officers.

=== Partnerships ===
MedShare is partnered with a number of corporations, religious entities and other non-profit organizations, including:

- Airlink
- Athenahealth
- Baxter International
- BD
- Buckhead Church
- Children's Healthcare of Atlanta
- Coca-Cola Company
- CommonSpirit Health
- Emory Healthcare
- Flexport
- Food for the Poor
- Halyard Health
- Henry Schein
- Hill-Rom
- Johnson & Johnson
- Kaiser Permanente
- Kendeda Fund
- Lordina Foundation
- North Point Ministries
- Northwell Health
- Partnership for Quality Medical Donations (PQMD)
- Philips Foundation
- Preston-Werner Foundation
- Sutter Health
- United Parcel Service (UPS)

=== Funding ===
MedShare receives funding from corporations, foundations, and individuals to fund its operations, as well as in-kind donations of medical supplies from manufacturers and distributors.

== Awards and recognitions ==
MedShare is a four-star ranked charity by Charity Navigator.
