= Browns Bridge Church =

- Browns Bridge Church
- 34.259890°N 84.087035°W
- Location: Cumming, GA
- Country: United States
- Denomination: Non-Denominational, Evangelical Christian
- Website: brownsbridge.org

History
- Former name: Browns Bridge Community Church
- Status: Active
- Founded: 2006
- Founder: Andy Stanley

Architecture
- Architect: Niles Bolton Associates

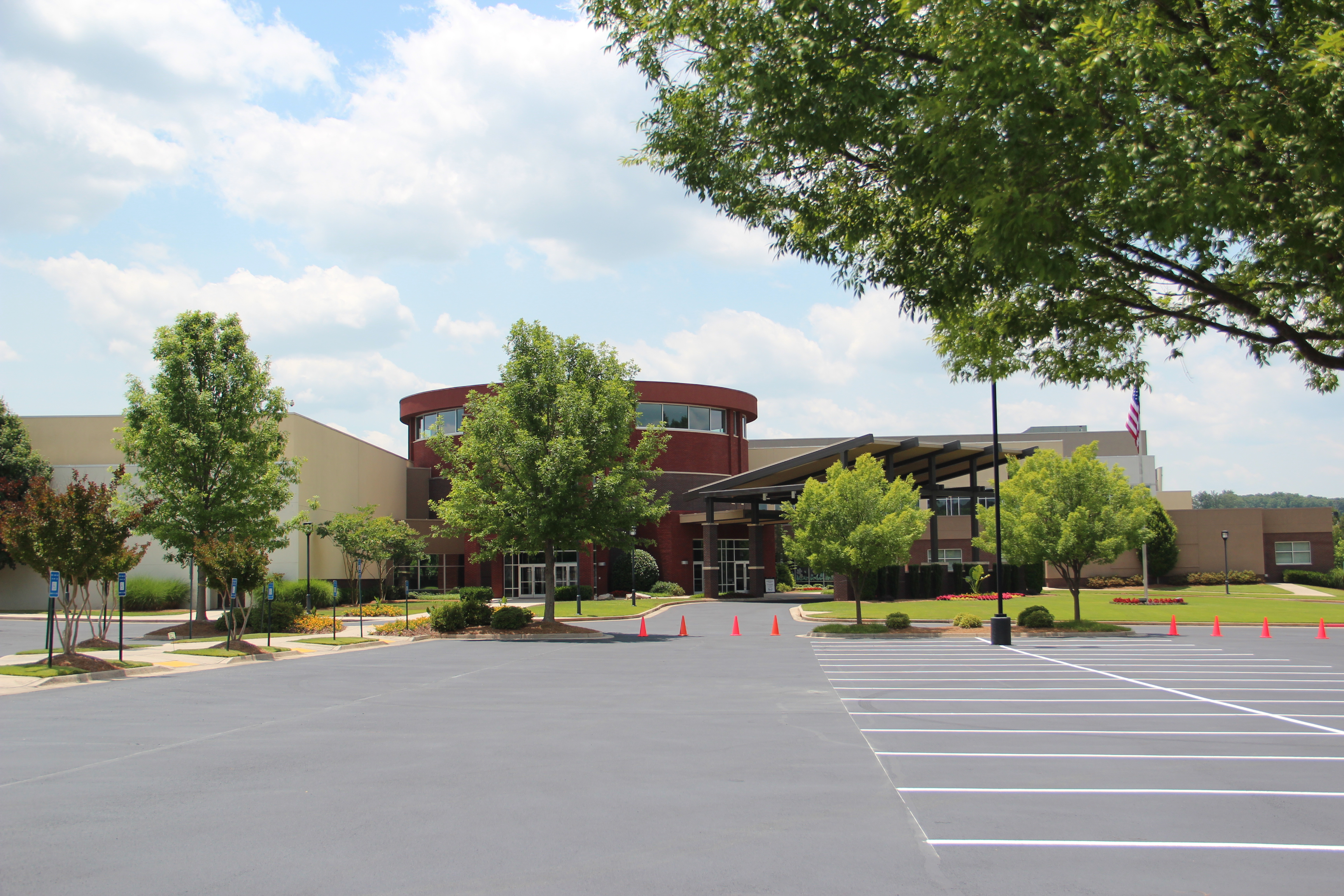
Browns Bridge Church in 2019

Browns Bridge Church is a nondenominational Christian church located in Cumming, Georgia. It is one of eight locations of North Point Ministries. Andy Stanley is the senior pastor of North Point Ministries, and Adam Johnson is the lead pastor of Browns Bridge Church.

Browns Bridge Church opened on October 8, 2006, as the third satellite location of North Point Ministries. The name of the church comes from the former Browns Bridge which spanned across Lake Lanier from 1956 until 2021.

North Point Ministries serves as the parent organization of North Point Community Church, Buckhead Church, Woodstock City Church, Gwinnett Church, Decatur City Church, and East Cobb Church. Several other autonomous churches are associated with North Point Ministries as strategic partners.
