= Antelope, Texas =

- Unincorporated community
- Location within Texas Location within the United States
- Coordinates: 33°26′30″N 98°22′11″W
- Country: United States
- State: Texas
- County: Jack
- Elevation: 1,024 ft (312 m)
- Time zone: UTC-6 (Central (CST))
  - Summer (DST): UTC-5 (CDT)
- Area code: 940
- GNIS feature ID: 1351138

Antelope is an unincorporated community in Jack County, Texas, United States. According to the Handbook of Texas, the community had a population of 65 in 2000.

== History ==
Antelope got a post office in 1858, and B. F. Spear served as postmaster in 1859. Situated close to the West Fork of the Trinity River, the town served as a supply and overnight stop for cattle travelers. The six blocks surrounding the town square were surveyed and platted by Walter S. Jones in 1875, but the paperwork was not filed until 1889. With 300 residents and a hotel, many general stores, and Methodist and Baptist churches, Antelope offered daily stages to Henrietta and Graham for two dollars at the turn of the 19th century. Up until 1900, the town had a saw and grist mill, which was eventually replaced with a cotton mill. Drummers frequently spent the night in this location. The population was 200 in 1914. There was no mill or hotel in the hamlet, but there were still a few local businesses, a doctor, and a blacksmith. In the 1940s, there were 166 residents. The village featured a fuel station, garage, Methodist and Baptist churches, and the Mullins Brothers general store, which had been operational since 1883. The neighboring oilfields and stockrearing contributed to the community's prosperity. The population dropped to 65 in the 1980s and stayed there in 1990 and 2000. There were still two companies in the settlement.

On April 5-6, 1955, an F3 tornado hit Antelope, Shannon, and Newport, but did not cause any damage. On May 19, 2015, an EF0 tornado struck Antelope. This brief tornado caused minimal damage over open range land.

== Geography ==
Antelope is located at the intersection of Farm to Market Road 175, U.S. Highway 281, and Texas State Highway Loop 187, 37 mi (60 km) northeast of Graham, 90 mi (140 km) northwest of Fort Worth, and 20 mi (32 km) northwest of Jacksboro in northwestern Jack County.

=== Climate ===
The climate in this area is characterized by hot, humid summers and generally mild to cool winters. According to the Köppen Climate Classification system, Antelope has a humid subtropical climate, abbreviated "Cfa" on climate maps.

== Education ==
Antelope had its own school in 1890 and the 1940s. Today, the community is served by the Jacksboro Independent School District.

== Notable people ==
- Russell H. Dilday, pastor and chancellor of the B.H. Carroll Theological Institute.

== See also ==
- Texas State Highway 16
- Farm to Market Road 1191
- Texas State Highway 114
