= Edward Kirkland =

Edward Kirkland may refer to:

- Edward C. Kirkland, American historian
- Edward R. Kirkland, American attorney and politician

== See also ==
- Eddie Kirkland, American electric blues guitarist
- Eddie Kirkland (Christian musician), American Christian musician and pastor
