= Second-Ponce de Leon Baptist Church =

Baptist church in Atlanta, Georgia, United States

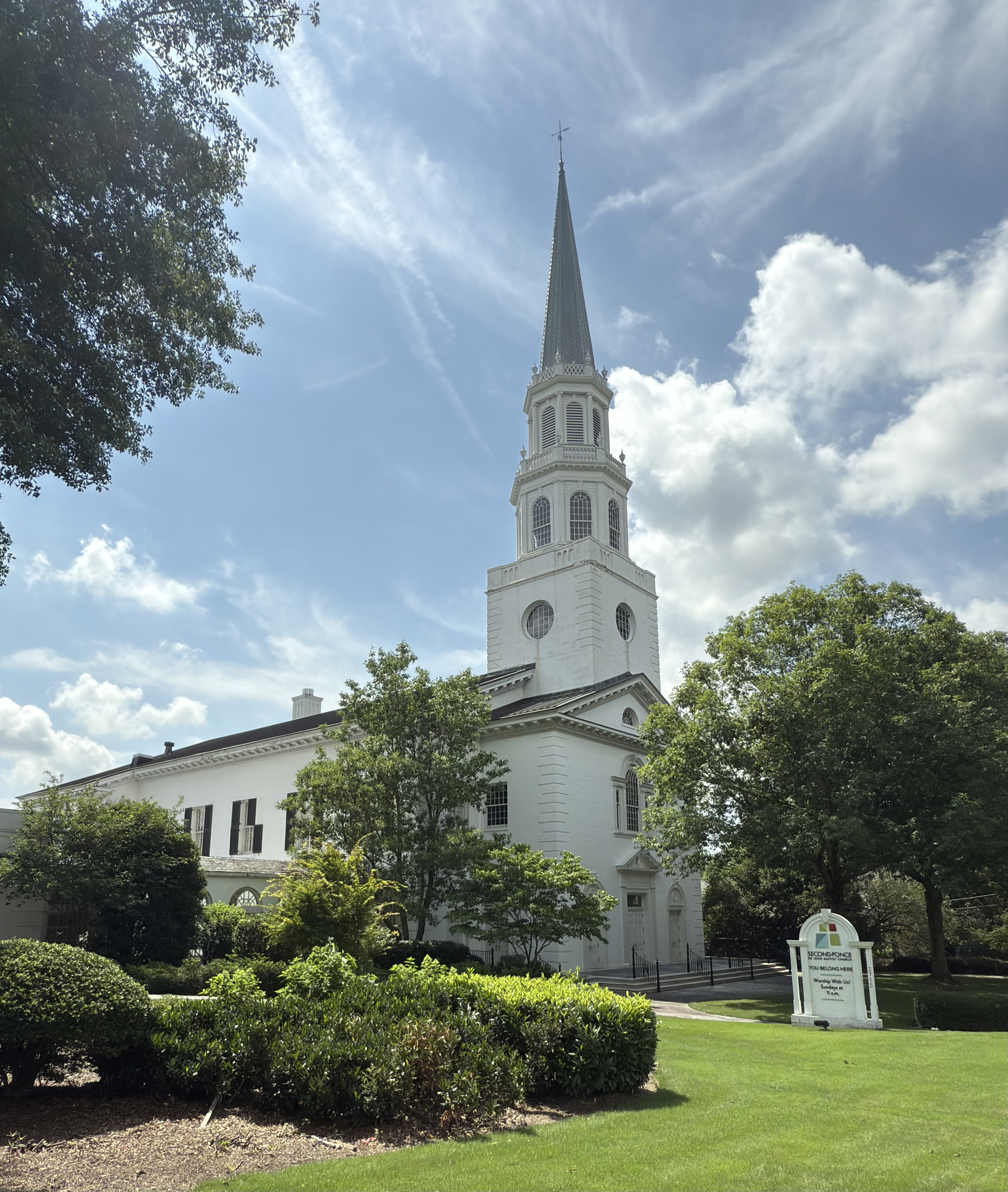
- The church in 2025
- Second-Ponce de Leon Baptist Church
- 33°49′44″N 84°23′13″W
- Address: 2715 Peachtree Road; Atlanta, Georgia
- Country: United States
- Denomination: Baptist
- Website: www.spdl.org

History
- Founded: November 1932 (Note: Sources vary on the date of the merger between Second Baptist Church and Ponce de Leon Baptist Church. A 1954 book on the history of the church states that a merger document was signed by representatives of the two churches on November 9. However, a 2003 book on the history of Buckhead states that the date of the merger was November 20. Furthermore, in a 2020 thesis presented by Joshua Scott to the faculty of Gordon-Conwell Theological Seminary, the date is given as November 18.)
- Dedicated: October 10, 1937

Architecture
- Architects: George Harwell Bond; Peter Hand and Associates (addition)
- Style: Georgian Colonial; Neocolonial; Postmodern (addition)
- Years built: 1937

Administration
- Division: Cooperative Baptist Fellowship

Second-Ponce de Leon Baptist Church is a Cooperative Baptist Fellowship congregation in the Buckhead district of Atlanta, Georgia, United States. It was established in 1932 through the merger of Second Baptist Church and Ponce de Leon Baptist Church (established 1904). Its current church building was dedicated in 1937.

The church traces its history to 1854, when Second Baptist Church was established in downtown Atlanta. Ponce de Leon Baptist Church was established in 1904. In the early 1930s, both churches saw a decline in their congregations and experienced financial difficulties brought about by the Great Depression, prompting the two churches to merge and relocate. Since the mid-20th century, the church has had one of the largest congregations in the Southern Baptist Convention.

The current church building was designed by architect George Harwell Bond in the Georgian Colonial and neocolonial style, with inspiration drawn from colonial meeting houses and churches of that era.

== History ==
=== Predecessor churches ===
Second-Ponce de Leon Baptist Church was formed as the result of the merger of two Atlanta-based Baptist churches: Second Baptist Church and Ponce de Leon Baptist Church. Both of these churches had been established as missions of Atlanta's First Baptist Church, which had been established in 1848.

==== Second Baptist Church ====
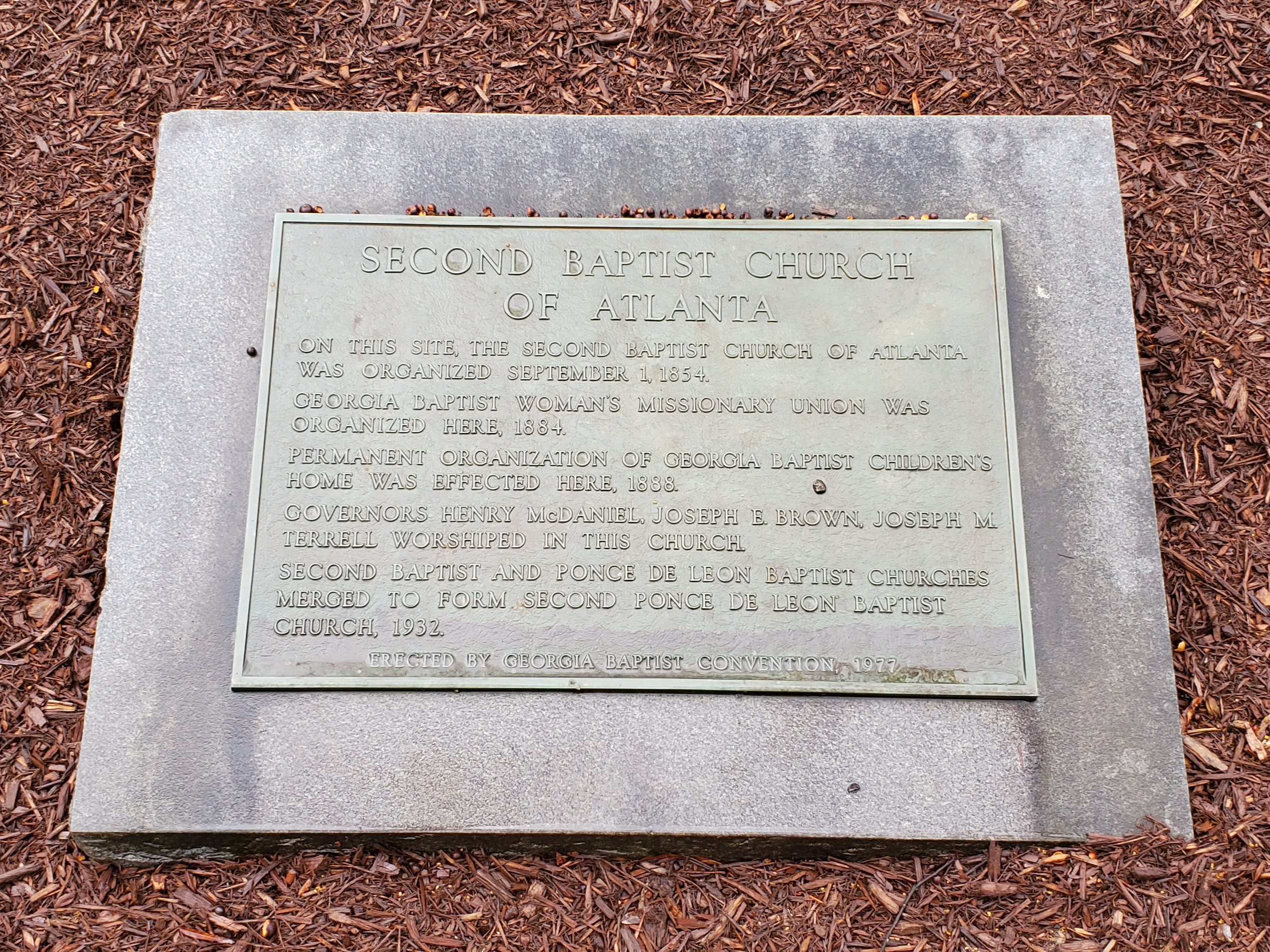
Historical marker at the location of Second Baptist Church near the Georgia State Capitol

Second Baptist was established on September 1, 1854, by 19 members of First Baptist. The Reverend Charles M. Irwin served as the church's first pastor. For the first several months after its establishment, Second Baptist operated as a house church while construction of its church building was underway. The church would be located at the intersection of Mitchell Street and Washington Street, across the street from the Atlanta City Hall. (Note: Atlanta City Hall later relocated, with the former site of the city hall serving as the location for the current Georgia State Capitol.) Work was completed in 1858, with the building being the first brick church built in Atlanta. During construction, a man named James Clark donated $500 to the church for the creation of a church bell, which was cast in the English city of Sheffield by Naylor Vickers & Co. in 1860.

In 1864, during the Atlanta campaign of the American Civil War, the church's bell was rung as a warning to city residents of the arrival of Union Army forces under the command of General William Tecumseh Sherman. In the fall of 1864, services ceased due to an evacuation from the city, but resumed by April 1865. In the interim, the building was used as a warehouse for dry goods and furniture.

The building was spared from destruction thanks to the advocacy of Thomas O'Reilly, a Catholic priest whose church was located on the same city block as Second Baptist. A 1939 editorial in The Atlanta Journal described the church and its bell as "one of the few landmarks that went unscathed when the flames of destruction roared". Shortly after the war's end in 1865, a private school began holding classes in the basement of the church. Religious services continued at the church's original building until 1890, when it was demolished to make way for a new church building. This new building was completed by 1893. In 1909, the church had a membership of 1,351.

Several other churches in Atlanta began as missions of Second Baptist. These include Third Baptist (also known as Jones Avenue Baptist Church), Fourth Baptist (also known as James Chapel before merging with another church to become Central Baptist), and Immanuel Baptist. Notable members of Second Baptist included four governors of Georgia (Joseph E. Brown, Joseph Mackey Brown, Henry Dickerson McDaniel, and Joseph M. Terrell), Atlanta Mayor George Hillyer, Judge Beverly Daniel Evans Jr., and academic Marion L. Brittain.

==== Ponce de Leon Baptist Church ====
Ponce de Leon Baptist Church was established on October 6, 1904, with 115 charter members. Of these, 84 were from First Baptist, while 19 were from Second Baptist. Prior to the creation of a dedicated church building, services were initially held at a house on Peachtree Street before using the facilities of North Avenue Presbyterian Church. Prior to the arrival of the church's first pastor in January 1905, former Georgia Governor William J. Northen served as the congregation's chairman. Property at the intersection of Piedmont Avenue and Ponce de Leon Avenue was purchased by the church as the site for a permanent building, with the first services in this new facility being held in September 1906.

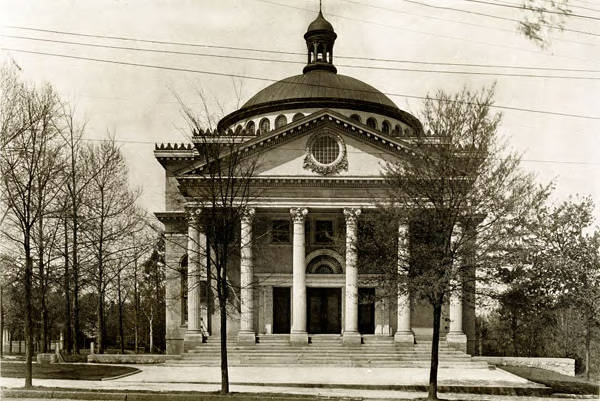
Ponce de Leon Baptist Church, 1909

In September 1908, the Stone Mountain Baptist Association held a meeting at the church that ultimately led to the creation of the Atlanta Baptist Association the following year. At that time, the church had a membership of 376. In 1929, the church purchased property along Peachtree Road for the construction of a new church building, which they moved into the following year. (Note: Both Peachtree Street and Peachtree Road refer to the same thoroughfare in different areas of the city.)

Also in 1929, the church merged with Buckhead Baptist Church, which had been established in 1911. For several months after this merger, the church held services in Buckhead Baptist's building while construction commenced on the Peachtree Road property. Much of the history of Buckhead Baptist is unknown, as its historical records were destroyed in a warehouse fire sometime prior to 1954.

=== Merger ===
By the early 1930s, the congregations at both Second and Ponce de Leon began to decline as people began to relocate outside downtown Atlanta. Additionally, both churches were experiencing economic stress caused by the Great Depression in the United States. As a result, the two churches decided that it would be in their best interests to merge and relocate to the Buckhead district of Atlanta. This merger occurred in November 1932, with the new church adopting its current name. Architect George Harwell Bond designed a new building for the combined congregation, with construction finishing in 1937. Construction on the church coincided with a slight development boom in the Garden Hills neighborhood of Buckhead, occurring around the same time that Philip T. Shutze's North Fulton High School and Garden Hills Elementary School were being constructed. On October 10, 1937, the church was officially dedicated. Two years later, on December 12, 1939, the church bell that had been installed in the original Second Baptist building was installed in the new building.

In 1941, the church was surveyed as part of a project by the Works Progress Administration. Surveyors listed that, at the time, the church had a membership of 2,060 and a Sunday school enrollment of 1,607. The church's property was given a valuation of $425,000 (equivalent to $9.3 million in 2025). At the time, Ryland Knight served as the pastor. Knight had previously been the pastor at Second Baptist and continued in that role at Second-Ponce de Leon until 1945.

=== Leadership of Monroe F. Swilley Jr. ===
On October 1, 1945, Monroe F. Swilley Jr. became Second-Ponce de Leon's pastor. At the time, the church had a congregation of about 2,500. In the late 1940s, he oversaw an expansion plan for the church, purchasing property adjacent to the church as well as a new property north of the church to serve as the location for a new church. Physical changes to the church's campus included the creation of a chapel building, a recreation building, and a pastorium. By 1954, the congregation had grown to about 3,600, with a Sunday school enrollment of 3,500. Under his pastorship, the church's congregation became one of the largest churches in not only the Georgia Baptist Convention, but the Southern Baptist Convention as a whole.

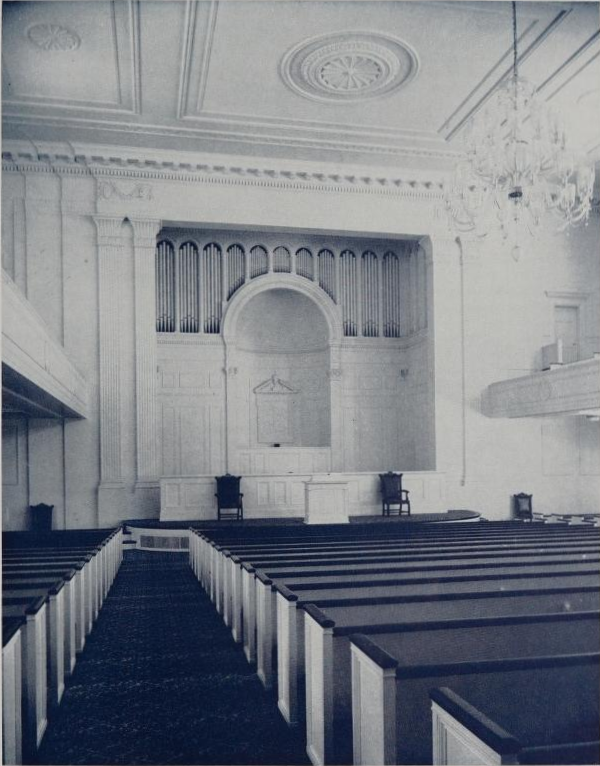
The nave of the church, c. 1954

In 1950, Swilley was appointed by the Atlanta Baptist Association to chair a committee tasked with establishing a Baptist college in Metro Atlanta. The congregants of Second-Ponce de Leon were largely supportive of the proposed college and contributed extensively to fundraising projects. In 1969, the Atlanta Baptist College opened, with Swilley leaving Second-Ponce de Leon in order to serve as the college's first president. In 1972, the college merged with Mercer University, with Swilley serving as a vice president until retiring in 1989. For the first several decades after its creation, Second-Ponce de Leon's congregation and clergy was made up entirely of White Americans. In 1961, the church's deacons established a racially segregated seating plan whereby any African American visitors would sit in a roped-off area in the rear of the sanctuary.

=== Late 20th century ===
In the 1970s, Russell H. Dilday served as pastor for the church. This was a period of increasing strife between conservative and liberal factions in the Southern Baptist Convention. 38 deacons left First Baptist Church in the decade after Charles Stanley, a strong conservative, became pastor of that church. Many of these deacons joined the congregation of Second-Ponce de Leon, which ultimately accepted about 200 former members of First Baptist. Addressing the division in 1976, Dilday told his congregation that the attention of the Southern Baptist Convention should not "be wasted on differences in theological positions but rather spent on unity and usefulness in the task God has given us to carry out". Dilday departed from Second-Ponce de Leon in 1978 to become the president of the Southwestern Baptist Theological Seminary in Fort Worth, Texas.

Dilday was succeeded in 1979 by Robert Marsh, who attempted to lead the church in a moderate position. In 1986, the church hosted a meeting of a Southern Baptist Convention Women in Ministry organization. In 1990, an addition to the church building was added, with the architectural firm of Peter Hand and Associates overseeing the project. In 1995, the church introduced an outreach program to help certain groups in the community, including cancer patients, the homeless, prisoners, immigrants, students, and prayer groups. By 1999, the church boasted a congregation of about 3,600 members and was affiliated with both the Southern Baptist Convention and the Cooperative Baptist Fellowship. At the time, the church offered both contemporary and traditional worship services and accepted both men and women to the diaconate.

=== 21st century ===
In 2003, the church had a membership of about 3,500, making it one of the largest Southern Baptist congregations in the United States. Among the programs offered by the church at this time were a weekday preschool program and a recreational facility that was open to both church members and non-members. At the time, the church was in the midst of a $12 million ($21 million in 2025) renovation project. In January 2004, the church hosted Billy Kim and Denton Lotz, the president and general secretary of the Baptist World Alliance, respectively, as part of a series of meetings that the two were having with moderate Southern Baptist churches to garner support for their group. In 2009, the church hosted the funeral services for former United States Attorney General Griffin Bell.

In the 2010s, the church was involved in several projects with other Baptist churches. In March 2010, the church hosted the unveiling of the Celebrating Grace Hymnal, a Baptist hymnal developed by Mercer University in collaboration with individuals from several Baptist churches and religious institutions. In November of the following year, the church hosted the New Baptist Covenant II, an ecumenical meeting of Baptists from different denominations and racial and ethnic backgrounds. Former United States President Jimmy Carter, himself a Baptist, participated in the event, speaking at the church.

In 2019, the church launched a program aimed at promoting diversity within the church. However, as of 2020, the makeup of the church was still largely white and, due in part to its location in the more affluent Atlanta district of Buckhead, wealthier than average. That year, the church established a college ministry. In 2021, the church was one of several hosts for the Cooperating Baptist Fellowship's annual General Assembly. At the time, the church was still dually affiliated with the Cooperating Baptist Fellowship and Southern Baptist Convention.

== Architecture and design ==
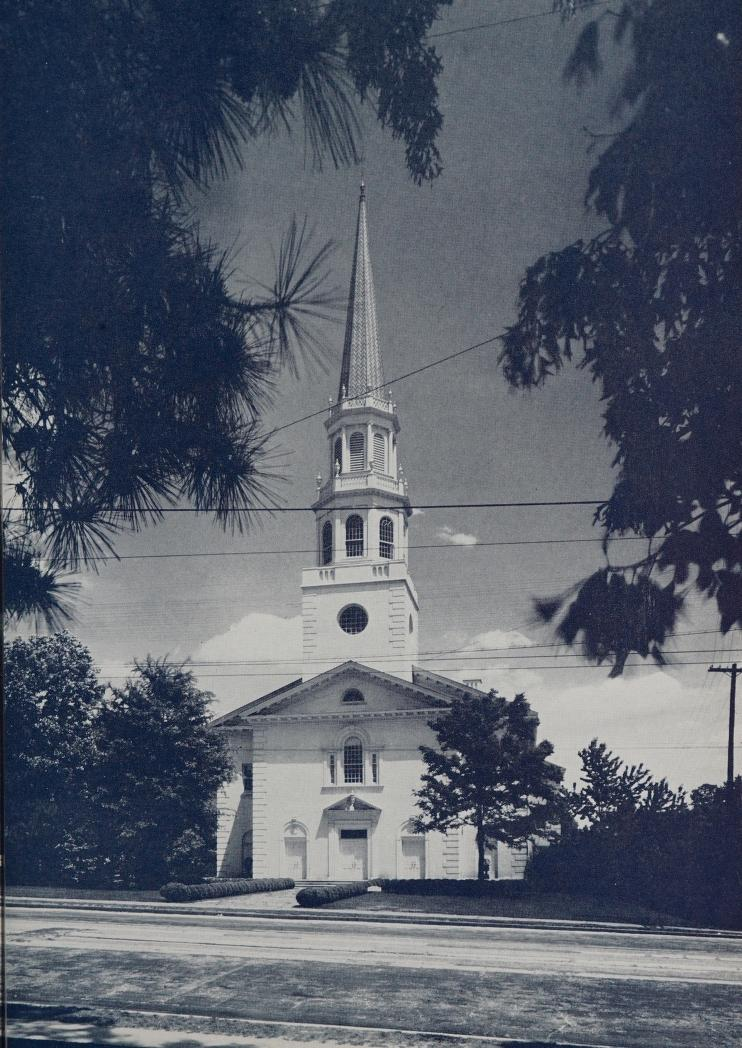
Second-Ponce de Leon Baptist Church, c. 1954

The church is located in the Garden Hills section of Buckhead, at 2715 Peachtree Road NE. It is located in close proximity to two other large churches that are also on Peachtree Road: the Episcopal Cathedral of Saint Philip, which serves as the cathedral for the Episcopal Diocese of Atlanta, and the Cathedral of Christ the King, which serves as the cathedral for the Roman Catholic Archdiocese of Atlanta.

The church building is four stories tall and made of brick, with a white painted exterior. The building has a frontage of 71 feet (22 m) and a length of 167 ft (51 m). The auditorium has dimensions of 68 ft (21 m) by 87 ft (27 m), with a balcony on either side of the room that extends 13 ft (4.0 m) inwards. The height from the ground to the ceiling at the pulpit is 36 ft (11 m). Measured from ground level, the spire atop the steeple reaches a height of 160 ft (49 m).

A 1941 survey of the building reported that it contained 70 rooms. Per Bond, the auditorium could hold a total of 1,274, with 812 seated in the main floor area, 418 in the balcony area, and 44 in the choir. Additionally, the total capacity for all of the Sunday school rooms is approximately 1,500.

Concerning the architectural style, a 1941 survey by the Works Progress Administration reported that the building was constructed in the Georgian Colonial style. In a 1993 book, the American Institute of Architects referred to the style as neocolonial, with the addition to the structure being in the postmodern style. Bond stated that he drew inspiration from colonial meeting houses and churches from that era. For the exterior, he specifically highlighted First Baptist Church in America in Providence, Rhode Island, Trinity Church in Newport, Rhode Island, and both Old North Church and Old South Church in Boston. For the interior, he highlighted First Presbyterian Church in Sag Harbor, New York, First Presbyterian Church in Newark, New Jersey, and others.

== Sources ==
- "Address by Mrs. John S. Spalding". Atlanta Historical Bulletin. VIII (30). Atlanta Historical Society: 37–38. October 1945. ISSN 0896-3975.
- Bellinger, Libby (1993). "The History of Southern Baptist Women in Ministry". In Shurden, Walter B. (ed.). The Struggle for the Soul of the SBC: Moderate Responses to the Fundamentalist Movement. Macon, Georgia: Mercer University Press. pp. 129–150. ISBN 978-0-86554-425-3. OCLC 27726805.
- Fletcher, Jesse C. (1994). The Southern Baptist Convention: A Sesquicentennial History. Nashville, Tennessee: Broadman & Holman. ISBN 978-0-8054-1167-6. OCLC 29952847.
- Inventory of the Church Archives of Georgia: Atlanta Association of Baptist Churches, Affiliated with Georgia Baptist Convention. Atlanta: The Georgia Historical Records Survey, Division of Community Service Programs, Works Progress Administration. April 1941. OCLC 2793473.
- Gournay, Isabelle (1993). Sams, Gerald W. (ed.). AIA Guide to the Architecture of Atlanta. Photographs by Paul G. Beswick; Foreword by Dana F. White. Athens, Georgia: University of Georgia Press. ISBN 978-0-8203-1439-6. OCLC 25675649.
- Hickel, Jan (2003). Buckhead: Atlanta's First Address. Corporate profiles by Candace T. Botha; Photography by L. A. Popp and Patrick Kelly. Macon, Georgia: Indigo Custom Publishing. ISBN 978-0-9725951-0-0. OCLC 54817511.
- A History of the Second-Ponce de Leon Baptist Church, Atlanta, Georgia: Centennial Year, 1854–1954. Atlanta: Darby Printing Company. 1954. OCLC 4840558.
- Kunkle, Camille (Spring 1989). Rice, Bradley R. (ed.). "Atlanta's Churches in 1896". Atlanta History: A Journal of Georgia and the South. XXXIII (1). Atlanta Historical Society: 35–48. ISSN 0896-3975.
- Newton, Louie D. (1958). Fifty Golden Years: The Atlanta Association of Baptist Churches, 1909–1958. Research by Jack U. Harwell. Hapeville, Georgia: Longino & Porter, Incorporated. OCLC 1459224.
- Scott, Joshua (May 2020). A Homiletic of Harmony: How the Multi View of the Atonement in Gardner Taylor's Preaching Can Lead Toward Racial Reconciliation. A Thesis Submitted to the Faculty of Gordon-Conwell Theological Seminary.
- Shavin, Norman; Galphin, Bruce (1985) [1982]. Atlanta: Triumph of a People (Revised ed.). Atlanta: Capricorn Corporation. ISBN 978-0-910719-12-4. OCLC 12688842.
