= Simon Guobadia =

Nigerian-American entrepreneur (born 1964)

Simon Iyore Guobadia (born June 2, 1964) is a Nigerian entrepreneur, philanthropist, and executive producer.

== Early life ==
Guobadia was born on June 2, 1964 in Nigeria.

== Career ==
Guobadia founded SIMCOL Petroleum Limited Company in 2010. SIMCOL is a regional fuel supplier, headquartered in Atlanta, Georgia, specializing in the supply and distribution of Ultra Low Sulfur Diesel (ULSD) and various grades of gasoline products. He has worked alongside Academy Award winner, Spike Lee to executive produce the 2020 film, Son of the South.

Guobadia opened Simon's Restaurant in September 2017 in Midtown, Atlanta. The restaurant closed in May 2020 due to the COVID-19 pandemic.

== Personal life ==
Guobadia is a member of Northpoint Ministries. Guobadia has five biological children: Quentin, Nicole, Christian, Benjamin and Ximena in Atlanta, GA.

On November 25, 2022, Guobadia married Porsha Williams. Guobadia was previously married to Falynn Pina, Williams' co-star on the television show, The Real Housewives of Atlanta. In February 2024, Porsha filed for divorce. Prior to his marriage with Falynn, Marsha Shackelford, a yoga practitioner and educator, was Simon Guobadia's second wife. In an interview, she revealed "[they] broke up the next day after [their] second anniversary." Marsha further claimed the "marriage was toxic", and she felt that "[she] was the only one trying to make it work."

Simon Guobadia's first wife was Karron English, who works as a college professor at the Art Institute of Atlanta; they were married for 20 years.

In February 2025, Guobadia was detained by ICE. After four months of detention, he was deported from the United States.
