= HYH =

HYH may refer to:

- нун, the name for the letter H in the Arabic alphabet of the Kazakh language.
- Halyard Health, an American medical equipment manufacturer
- Hydra Head Records
- Hythe (Essex) railway station, in England
