= Charles Stanley =

American pastor and televangelist (1932–2023)

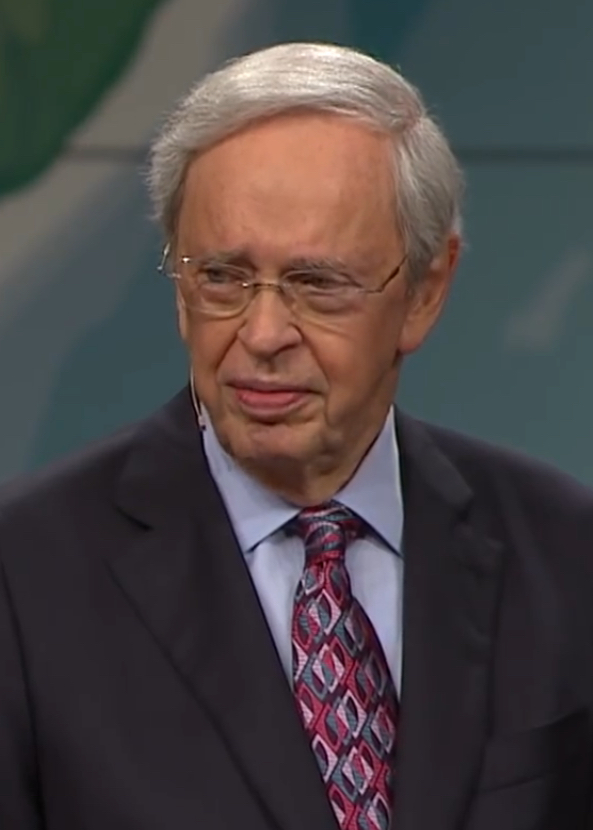
- Charles Stanley
- Church: First Baptist Church (Atlanta)

Orders
- Ordination: 1956

Personal details
- Born: Charles Frazier Stanley, Jr. September 25, 1932 Dry Fork, Virginia, U.S.
- Died: April 18, 2023 (aged 90) Atlanta, Georgia, U.S.
- Denomination: Baptist (Southern Baptist Convention)
- Spouse: Anna Johnson Stanley (m. 1955; div. 2000)
- Children: 2 including Andy Stanley
- Occupation: Televangelist; Author; Senior Pastor of First Baptist Church, Atlanta (1971–2020); President of the Southern Baptist Convention (1984–1986)
- Education: University of Richmond (BA); Southwestern Baptist Theological Seminary (MDiv); Luther Rice College & Seminary (ThM, DTh)

Charles Frazier Stanley Jr. (September 25, 1932 – April 18, 2023) was an American Southern Baptist pastor and writer. He was senior pastor of First Baptist Church in Atlanta for 49 years and took on emeritus status in 2020. He founded and was president of In Touch Ministries which widely broadcasts his sermons through television and radio. He also served two one-year terms as president of the Southern Baptist Convention, from 1984 to 1986.

== Early life and education ==
Stanley was born on September 25, 1932, in Dry Fork, Pittsylvania County, Virginia, in the midst of the Great Depression. His parents were Charles Frazier "Charlie" Stanley Sr. and Rebecca Susan Hall (née Hardy, formerly Stanley). His father died when he was nine months old. When Stanley was nine, his mother remarried John Hall, a truck driver, and had a daughter. His paternal grandfather was Reverend George Washington Stanley, who was originally from Chatham County, North Carolina.

At the age of 12, around 1944, Stanley became a born-again Christian, and at age 14 he began his life's work in Christian ministry.

Stanley graduated in 1956 at the age of 23, from the University of Richmond with a Bachelor of Arts degree. He studied at Southwestern Baptist Theological Seminary in Fort Worth, Texas, earning a Master of Divinity. He also earned a Master of Theology and a Doctor of Theology degree from Luther Rice College & Seminary (at the time located in Jacksonville, Florida).

== Ministry ==
Stanley joined the staff of First Baptist Church of Atlanta in 1969 and became senior pastor in 1971.

In 1972, Stanley launched a half-hour religious television program called The Chapel Hour. In 1977, he founded In Touch Ministries with the mission to lead people worldwide into a growing relationship with Jesus Christ and to strengthen the local church. The Christian Broadcasting Network began televising In Touch in 1978. The show has since been translated in 50 languages. In the United States, In Touch is broadcast on approximately 500 radio stations, 300 television stations, and several satellite networks including The Inspiration Network (INSP) and Trinity Broadcasting Network. Stanley's sermons, along with other audio and video programming, are available on the In Touch website. The ministry also publishes In Touch magazine. In Touch uses tools like radio, television, magazines and digital media in its effort to advance the Gospel as quickly as possible. Stanley took the ministry name In Touch from a Living Bible he owned.

Stanley's writings and broadcasts address issues such as finances, parenting, personal crises, emotional matters, relationships, and Protestantism. The In Touch website said, "Dr. Stanley fervently believes the Bible to be the inerrant Word of God, a belief strongly reflected in his teaching."

In 1985, Stanley was elected president of the Southern Baptist Convention.

In 2017, Stanley named Anthony George to succeed him as senior pastor of First Baptist Church at some point in the future. On September 13, 2020, Stanley announced his retirement as senior pastor and transition to pastor emeritus, but noted that he would continue to work at In Touch Ministries.

== Influences on his theology ==
With regard to Christian theology, Stanley was a conservative evangelical, and his eschatology was dispensationalist. Over the course of his ministry, Stanley developed "30 Life Principles" that he felt were essential. He credited his Pentecostal grandfather, George Washington Stanley, with inspiring one of the most referenced principles of the thirty: “Obey God and leave all the consequences to Him." In his book Courageous Faith: My Story from a Life of Obedience, Stanley said: "Granddad told me, 'Charles, if God tells you to run your head through a brick wall, you head for the wall, and when you get there, God will make a hole for it.'"

In 2009, Stanley also addressed the influences on his philosophy when he wrote that he "began to apply the principles of Napoleon Hill's Think and Grow Rich to my endeavors as a pastor, and I discovered they worked!... For years, I read [it] every year to remind myself that the truth of God is not just for one career field. It is for all manner of work and ministry."

== Personal life ==
Stanley had a daughter and a son, Andy Stanley, who is the pastor of North Point Community Church in nearby Alpharetta. In addition to his work in Christian ministry, Stanley was an avid photographer, with a particular interest in nature and wildlife . Much of his photographic work is featured in the In Touch magazine, as well as in other materials which are printed by the ministry, including the In Touch wall and desk calendars.

Anna J. Stanley was married to Stanley for more than 40 years; she filed for divorce on June 22, 1993, after they separated in the spring of 1992. The two of them agreed that Anna would amend the lawsuit to seek a legal separation instead ("separate maintenance"), while they were seeking reconciliation. On March 20, 1995, she filed for divorce again. The Moody Radio Network station in Atlanta (then-WAFS) took Stanley's daily broadcast off the air during the broadcasting time, because managers concluded that there was no sign of reconciliation. The Stanleys were legally separated at the time that divorce papers were filed for the last time on February 16, 2000. A judge signed the final divorce decree on May 11, 2000.

Their divorce caused a minor controversy within the Southern Baptist Convention. The matter was complicated by reports which stated that Stanley had said that he would resign as pastor if he got divorced. At the time of their separation, he said that he did not believe that it would result in divorce; however after he was divorced, the members of his church overwhelmingly voted to keep him as their pastor. According to First Baptist Atlanta's bylaws, Stanley was allowed to remain as pastor as long as he did not remarry. Anna Stanley died on November 10, 2014.

A close friend of the Moral Majority's founder Jerry Falwell, Stanley served on the organization's board.

== Death ==
Stanley died at his home in Atlanta on April 18, 2023, at the age of 90. No cause of death was revealed.

== Bibliography ==
- 1980: Making The Bible Clear with Fred L. Lowery ISBN 0-961079223
- 1982: Handle With Prayer ISBN 0-89693-963-4
- 1985: How to Listen to God ISBN 0-8407-9041-4
- 1985: Confronting Casual Christianity ISBN 0-8054-5022-X
- 1986: How to Keep Your Kids on Your Team ISBN 0-7852-7351-4
- 1989: How to Handle Adversity ISBN 0-7852-6418-3
- 1990: Eternal Security: Can You Be Sure? ISBN 0-7852-6417-5
- 1991: The Gift of Forgiveness ISBN 0-7852-6415-9
- 1992: The Wonderful Spirit-Filled Life ISBN 0785277471
- 1995: The Love of God ISBN 1-56476-532-6
- 1995: The Source of My Strength ISBN 0-7852-0569-1
- 1999: A Touch of His Power: Meditations on God's Awesome Power ISBN 0-310-21492-0
- 2000: Success God's Way ISBN 0-7852-6590-2
- 2000: Into His Presence: An In Touch Devotional ISBN 0-7852-8013-8
- 2001: The Gift of Love ISBN 0-7852-6618-6
- 2001: Our Unmet Needs ISBN 0-7852-7796-X
- 2002: Walking Wisely ISBN 0-7852-7298-4
- 2002: Winning the War Within ISBN 0-7852-6416-7
- 2003: Finding Peace ISBN 0-7852-7297-6
- 2003: God Is in Control ISBN 0-8499-5739-7
- 2004: When the Enemy Strikes ISBN 0-7852-8788-4
- 2005: Charles Stanley's Life Principles Bible ISBN 1-4185-0572-2
- 2005: Living in the Power of the Holy Spirit ISBN 0-7852-6512-0
- 2005: Living the Extraordinary Life: 9 Principles to Discover It ISBN 0-7852-6611-9
- 2006: Discover Your Destiny ISBN 0-7852-6369-1
- 2006: Pathways to His Presence: A Daily Devotional ISBN 0-7852-2163-8
- 2007: Landmines in the Path of the Believer: Avoiding the Hidden Dangers ISBN 1-4002-0090-3
- 2008: In Step with God ISBN 1-4002-0091-1
- 2008: Stuck in Reverse ISBN 1-4002-0094-6
- 2008: The Power of God's Love: A 31 Day Devotional to Encounter the Father's Greatest Gift ISBN 1-4002-0093-8
- 2008: When Your Children Hurt ISBN 1-4002-0098-9
- 2010: How to Reach Your Full Potential for God ISBN 978-1-4002-0092-4
- 2011: Turning the Tide: Real Hope Real Change ISBN 978-1-4516-26407
- 2012: Prayer: The Ultimate Conversation ISBN 978-1-4391-9065-4
- 2013: Man of God: Leading Your Family by Allowing God to Lead You ISBN 978-1-4347-0547-1
- 2013: Emotions: Confront the Lies. Conquer with Truth. ISBN 978-1-4767-5206-8
- 2013: Walking with God: Thoughts on His Indwelling Spirit, Volume 2 ISBN 0529108968
- 2014: Walking with God: Knowing God Through Prayer, Volume 3 ISBN 0785206965
- 2015: Waiting on God: Strength for Today and Hope for Tomorrow ISBN 978-1-4767-9403-7
- 2015: Christmas: The Gift for Every Heart ISBN 9780718042172
- 2016: Courageous Faith: My Story from a Life of Obedience ISBN 978-1-5011-3269-8
- 2017: Finding God's Blessings in Brokenness: How Pain Reveals His Deepest Love ISBN 9780310084129
- 2017: Standing Strong: How to Storm-Proof Your Life with God's Timeless Truths ISBN 9781501177392
- 2022: The Gift of the Cross Embracing the Promise of the Resurrection ISBN 9781400232451
- 2022: The Gift of Jesus: Meditations for Christmas ISBN 978-1400238866

== Television ==
Year	Title	Notes
1972	The Chapel Hour	Host
1983–1985	The Breakfast Club	Host
1978–2023	In Touch with Dr. Charles Stanley	Host
2002?–2024	TBN's Praise the Lord	Guest
2011	19 Kids and Counting	Episode: "Donating Duggars"
2012	Monica's Closeups	Guest

== Awards and honors ==
- 1988: National Religious Broadcasters Hall of Fame
- 1989: Named Clergyman of the Year by Religious Heritage of America
- 1993: National Religious Broadcasters named In Touch with Dr. Charles Stanley with Television Producer of the Year
- 1999: National Religious Broadcasters named In Touch with Dr. Charles Stanley Radio Program of the Year
- 2017: Thomas Nelson recognized Stanley for selling more than 3.5 million copies of his books

== See also ==
- List of Southern Baptist Convention affiliated people

Religious titles
Preceded by James T. Draper Jr.	President of the Southern Baptist Convention; 1984–1986	Succeeded by Adrian Rogers
