= Kings & Queens (Eddie Kirkland album) =

Studio album by Eddie Kirkland
- Released: August 14, 2012
- Genre: Worship
- Length: 49:03
- Label: North Point

Kings & Queens is a studio album from Eddie Kirkland. North Point Music released the album on August 14, 2012.

== Critical reception ==
Professional ratings
Review scores
Source	Rating
Cross Rhythms	7/10 squares
Indie Vision Music	4/5 stars
Worship Leader	4.5/5 stars

Awarding the album four and a half stars from Worship Leader, Jeremy Armstrong states, "Kings & Queens is filled with gut-wrenching poetry and subtle musical acumen". Doug Holland, rating the album a seven out of ten for Cross Rhythms, writes, "all of these tracks are competently composed and performed with aplomb." Giving the album four stars at Indie Vision Music, Jonathan Andre says, "an album with no dull points!" Joshua Andre, indicating in a 4.25 out of five review by Christian Music Zine, describes, "With such a musically diverse debut, Eddie Kirkland has done Northpoint Community Church proud, and he has stared in the face of the concept of a debut album, and arisen from the ordeal a more accomplished singer and writer."

== Track listing ==
No.	Title	Length
1.	"Here and Now"	4:30
2.	"The Solution"	3:42
3.	"Brighter Days"	5:19
4.	"Hosanna"	4:15
5.	"Kings & Queens"	4:52
6.	"Keep Holding On"	4:47
7.	"Glory to the King"	4:50
8.	"Anchor"	5:00
9.	"Lights of Manhattan (Let It Rise)"	4:07
10.	"What a Savior"	4:03
11.	"Have Your Way"	3:38
Total length:		49:03
