= Keeps on Changing =

Studio album by Seth Condrey
- Released: August 27, 2013
- Genres: Worship, CCM, Christian rock, folk, folk rock
- Length: 46:19
- Label: North Point
- Producer: Phillip LaRue

Keeps on Changing is a studio album from Seth Condrey. North Point Music released the album on August 27, 2013. He worked with Phillip LaRue, in the production of this album.

== Critical reception ==
Professional ratings
Review scores
Source	Rating
Cross Rhythms	9/10 squares
Indie Vision Music	3/5 stars
The Phantom Tollbooth	3.5/5
Worship Leader	4.5/5 stars

Awarding the album four and a half stars from Worship Leader, Jeremy Armstrong states, "Keeps On Changing is a stunning mix of congregational music infused and made alive with songs exuding from an individual's life-journey that is seeking after the face of God...Keeps On Changing is a musically diverse as it is globally award and theologically rich." Stephen Luff, rating the album a nine out of a ten for Cross Rhythms, writes, "The experienced gained at the church is reflected on 'Keeps On Changing' which is overflowing with contemporary sounds with heartfelt lyrics...added to the great songwriting including a song from Ed Cash...and top production by Phillip Larue...which penetrates the whole album, the combination is difficult to beat." Indicating in a three and a half out of five review at The Phantom Tollbooth, Derek Walker says, "Keeps on Changing exceeds what I expect from a large-church worship project in approach, songwriting and integrity." Jonathan Andre, rating the album three stars from Indie Vision Music, describes, "Seth Condrey’s new album is a joy to listen to as Seth brings to the fore new songs for the church through a conglomeration of musical themes and genres, from upbeat to reflective, to portraying a song with only a few instruments."

== Track listing ==
No.	Title	Writer(s)	Length
1.	"Speechless"	Seth Condrey, Phillip LaRue, Seth Mosley	3:55
2.	"Can't Outrun Your Love"	Condrey, LaRue, Kyle Lee	3:41
3.	"Oh, Radiant"	Condrey, Ben Gooch	4:12
4.	"Keeps on Changing"	Condrey, Ryan Harvey, Brendan Trinkle	3:58
5.	"The Answer"	Ed Cash, Condrey, LaRue	4:28
6.	"You Love My Soul"	Condrey, Scott Dugan, Derek McCloud	4:25
7.	"Help Me"	Codrey, Todd Fields	3:21
8.	"God of the Impossible"	Bryan Brown, Condrey, LaRue	3:27
9.	"Love like Fire"	Condrey, Mike Donehey, LaRue	3:42
10.	"Morning Hymn"	Condrey	6:15
11.	"Your Kingdom"	Condrey, James Tealy	4:55
Total length:			46:19
