= Russell H. Dilday =

American pastor (1930–2023)

6th President of Southwestern Baptist Theological Seminary
- In office 1978–1994
- Vice President: William Tolar
- Preceded by: Robert E. Naylor
- Succeeded by: Kenneth S. Hemphill

Personal details
- Born: September 30, 1930 Amarillo, Texas, U.S.
- Died: June 21, 2023 (aged 92) Dallas, Texas, U.S.
- Spouse: Betty Dilday (m. 1952; died 2018)
- Children: 3
- Parent(s): Hooper and Opal Dilday
- Education: Baylor University (B.A.); Southwestern Baptist Theological Seminary (M.Div., Ph.D.)
- Occupation: Seminary president, pastor, educator

Russell Hooper Dilday (September 30, 1930 – June 21, 2023) was an American pastor, educator, seminary president, and chancellor of the B.H. Carroll Theological Institute. He was best known for his tenure as president of Southwestern Baptist Theological Seminary until his abrupt dismissal in 1994 during the Southern Baptist Convention conservative resurgence.

== Career ==
Dilday served as president of Southwestern Baptist Theological Seminary starting in 1978. During his sixteen-year tenure, the seminary annual enrollment exceeded 5000 students, making it the largest in American theological education history. In 1990, Christianity Today released a poll of its readers ranking the effectiveness of American seminaries. Southwestern Seminary was ranked number one among the top 33 graduate theological schools in the nation.

Dilday was fired in March 1994 by what had become a majority conservative-leaning board of trustees in a 26–7 vote during the Southern Baptist Convention conservative resurgence. Dilday described the resurgence as having fragmented Southern Baptist fellowship and as being "far more serious than a controversy". Dilday described it as being "a self-destructive, contentious, one-sided feud that at times took on combative characteristics".

From 1979, Southern Baptists became polarized into two major groups: moderates and conservatives. Dilday was labeled a moderate, but preferred the term "constructive conservative." Reflecting the hyper-conservative majority votes of delegates at the 1979 annual meeting of the SBC, the new national organization officers and committees replaced all leaders of Southern Baptist agencies with presumably more conservative people (often dubbed "fundamentalists" by dissenters) who would carry out the takeover agenda.

In August 1994, Dilday was hired by Baylor University to serve as a professor of homiletics at the George W. Truett Theological Seminary and to be a special assistant to Baylor President Herbert Reynolds. He also served as acting dean of Truett Seminary.

Dilday served as interim president of Howard Payne University from 2002 to 2003.

Dilday was pastor of Texas Baptist churches including First Church in Antelope, Texas, a rural congregation, First Church in Clifton; and he led Tallowood Church in Houston "from a mission to one of the strongest missions churches in Texas Baptist life." His only non-Texas pastorate was at Second-Ponce de Leon Baptist Church in Atlanta, a large urban congregation.

== Personal life ==
Dilday earned degrees from Baylor University (B.A.) and Southwestern Baptist Theological Seminary (M.Div., Ph.D.).

A native Texan, Dilday grew up in a Texas Baptist minister's home. His father, Hooper Dilday, served a number of Texas churches, and was on the staff of the Baptist General Convention of Texas for 20 years in Sunday school, discipleship training, and church services, and was a long-time minister of education at First Church in Wichita Falls. His mother, Opal Spillers Dilday, was born in Memphis, Texas, and was a children's educational specialist in Baptist churches in Amarillo, Port Arthur, Port Neches, Wichita Falls, and Dallas. Dilday met his wife, Betty, in a Bible class at Baylor, got married in 1952, and had three children before Betty's death in 2018.

Dilday died on June 21, 2023, at the age of 92.

== Writings ==
- — (1977). You Can Overcome Discouragement.
- — (1989). The Doctrine of Biblical Authority.
- — (1985). Personal Computer: A New Tool for Ministers.
- — (1988). Communicator's Commentary: I & II Kings. Gold Medallion Award finalist for the “Best Commentary,”
- — (2004). The Preacher's Commentary. Vol. 9: 1 and 2 Kings. Nashville: Thomas Nelson. ISBN 978-1-4185-8783-3.
- — (October 2004). Columns: Glimpses of a Seminary Under Assault., that revisits Dilday's monthly presidential columns at Southwestern.
- — (2007). Higher Ground: A Call for Christian Civility. Smyth & Helwys Publishing, Inc. ISBN 978-1-57312-469-0.

== Honors ==
Dilday was recognized by Texas Monthly magazine as one of the "Texas Twenty" – persons across the state who "have proved to be pivotal forces in their respective fields – and, by extension, in Texas." He was also named by The Baptist Standard as one of the "ten most influential Texas Baptists in the twentieth century."

Dilday received honorary degrees from Baylor University (L.L.D), Mercer University (D.D.), William Jewell College (L.H.D.), and Dallas Baptist University (D. Hum.).

== Sources ==
- Southwestern Baptist Theological Seminary "In 1994, the seminary experienced a sudden change in leadership with the dismissal of Russell H. Dilday as president and the appointment…"
- B. H. Carroll Theological Institute "The institute's founding chancellor is Russell H. Dilday, a former president of Southwestern Baptist Theological Seminary, who launched…"
- Southern Baptist Convention conservative resurgence: "Dr. Russell H. Dilday, president of Southwestern Baptist Theological Seminary from 1978 to 1994, has analogized what he calls "the…"
- Southern Baptist Convention "Dilday, Russell. Higher Ground: A Call for Christian Civility. Macon, Georgia: Smyth and Helwys…"
- Howard Payne University "Dr. Russell H. Dilday (Interim President) 2002–2003"
- Baptist Faith and Message "Russell H. Dilday. An Analysis of the Baptist Faith and Message 2000."
