= Seth Condrey =

American Christian musician

- Born: Seth Brandon Condrey; November 24, 1983 (age 42); Greenville, South Carolina
- Origin: Kennesaw, Georgia
- Genres: Worship, CCM, Christian rock, folk, folk rock
- Occupations: Singer, songwriter, guitarist
- Instruments: Vocals, guitar
- Years active: 2002–present
- Labels: North Point, Entertainment One

Seth Brandon Condrey (born November 24, 1983) is an American Christian musician, who is a GMA Dove Award-winning artist, and was a worship leader at North Point Community Church in Alpharetta, Georgia. He has released four Latin Albums, and two English-language albums. The 2007 album, De Corazon a Corazon, won him the 39th GMA Dove Awards for Spanish Language Album of the Year.

== Early and personal life ==
Condrey was born, Seth Brandon Condrey, on November 24, 1983, in Greenville, South Carolina. He was homeschooled, until he went to college, at North Greenville University. His collegiate studies led him to spend a year in Argentina to attend Bible school. He now spends some of his time ministering in San José, Costa Rica, and is married to Jessica Condrey. Condrey and his family now reside in California, where Seth is a worship leader at a church in San Francisco.

== Music career ==
His music recording career started in 2002 or 2004, with the album, My All. His subsequent album, a Latin album, De Corazon a Corazon, won him a GMA Dove Award at the 39th Annual Awards, for Spanish Language Album of the Year. The third album, also a Latin album, Mi Vida Entera, was released in 2008. He released More Than I See in 2009 with Entertainment One. His next album, En Vivo, was released in 2012, from North Point Music. The latest album, Keeps on Changing, was released in 2013 also via North Point Music. In 2014, he released a Latin EP, Worship Sessions Vol. 1 on North Point Music.

== Discography ==
Studio albums

- My All (2002 or 2004, Latin)
- De Corazon a Corazon (2007, Latin)
- Mi Vida Entera (2008, Latin)
- More Than I See (2009, Entertainment One, English)
- En Vivo (2012, North Point, Latin)
- Keeps on Changing (2013, North Point, English)

EPs

- Worship Sessions Vol. 1 (2014, North Point, Latin)
- Sesiones de Adoracion Vol 2. EP (2016, North Point, Latin)

=== Singles ===
Year	Single	Chart Positions			Album
Year	Single	US Christ	US Christ Air.	US Chr Digital	Album
2017	"Death Was Arrested" (North Point InsideOut featuring Seth Condrey)	12	17	6	Hear
2018	"Every Beat" (North Point InsideOut featuring Seth Condrey)	—	29	—	
2018	"Emmanuel (Hope of Heaven)" (North Point InsideOut featuring Seth Condrey)	44	18	—	
