= Accendra Health =

Healthcare logistics company

Accendra Health (formerly Owens & Minor, Inc.)
- Company type: Public
- Traded as: NYSE: ACH
- Industry: Health care
- Founded: 1882; 144 years ago Incorporated in 1926; 100 years ago
- Founder: G. Gilmer Minor; Otho O. Owens
- Headquarters: Mechanicsville, Virginia, United States
- Key people: Edward A. Pesicka; (President & CEO); Andy Long; (Executive VP & CFO)
- Revenue: ▲10.3 billion (2023)
- Operating income: ▲368.47 million (2021)
- Net income: ▲221.59 million (2021)
- Total assets: ▲3.54 billion (2021)
- Total equity: ▲939 million (2021)
- Number of employees: ▲: 20,000; (2023)
- Website: accendrahealth.com

Accendra Health is a global healthcare company. It employs over 20,000 people in 70 countries. A Fortune 500 company, it was founded in 1882 in Richmond, Virginia, where it remains headquartered. The company has distribution, production, customer service and sales facilities located across the Asia Pacific region, Europe, Latin America, and North America. President and CEO Ed Pesicka joined Owens & Minor in March 2019.

== History ==
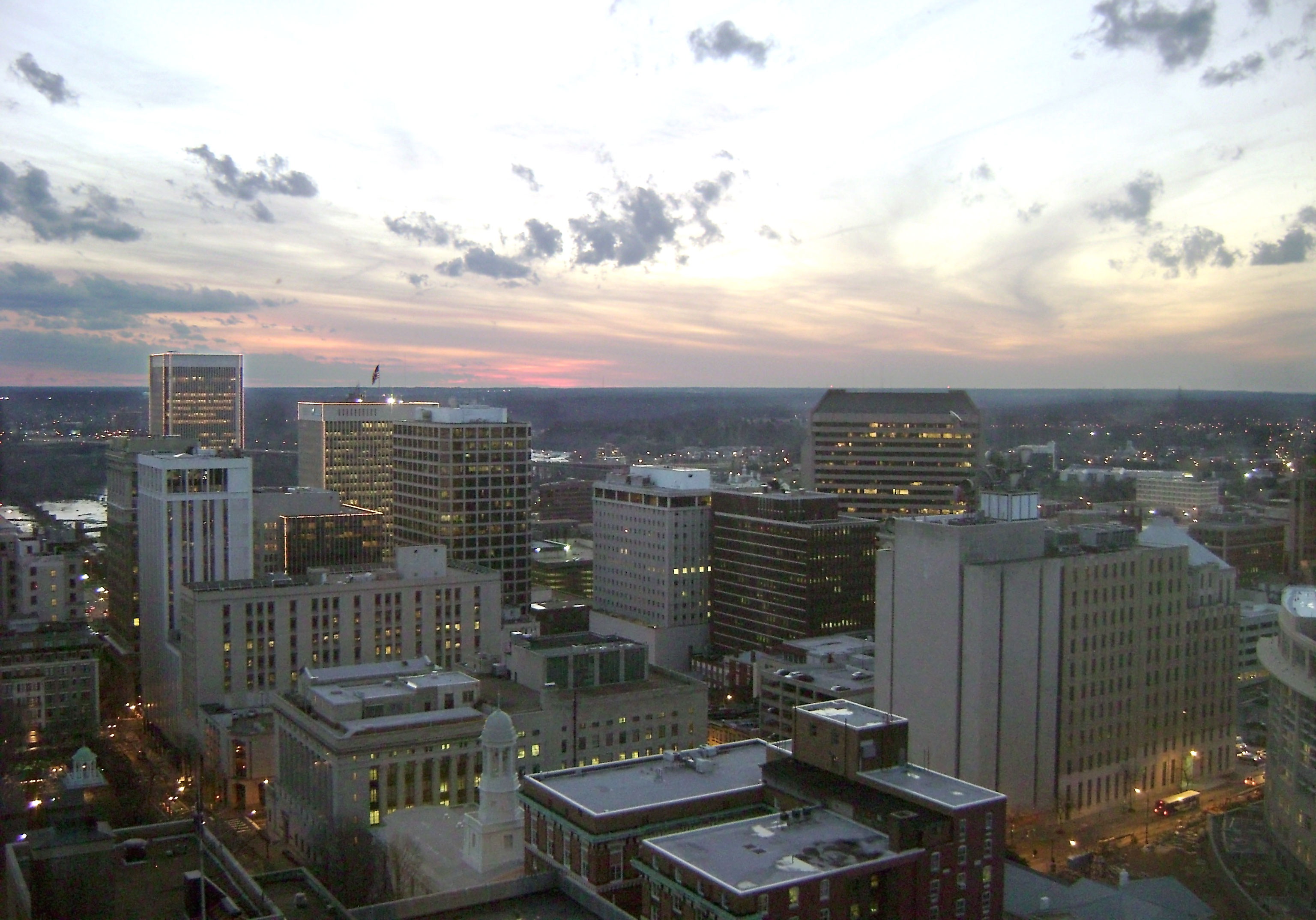
Accendra Health is now one of seven Fortune 500 companies headquartered in the Richmond area

Owens & Minor originally opened as a pharmacy company in downtown Richmond, Virginia in 1882, inside a historic building which still stands today. The company continued this business for over half a century until, in 1954, Gil Minor, Jr. bought out Bodeker Drug Company, a smaller operation in the same industry, changing the company name to Owens, Minor & Bodeker.

In 1966, the company acquired Virginia A&J Hospital Supply, adding medical and surgical distribution to its portfolio. By 1970, OMB had opened Cardinal Drug Centers, merchandising its products to independent drug companies, stocking shops with over 25,000 items within two years. Around this time, disposable items were distributed to hospitals for various medical procedures. G. Gilmer Minor III, a direct relation to the founder, became CEO in 1984. By 1988, Owens & Minor began trading on the New York Stock Exchange under the ticker OMI. It was around this time that revenues earned the company a Fortune 500 ranking.

By 1999, the company had refocused toward medical supply chain management. Throughout the 2000s, Owens & Minor acquired various medical distributors across the United States, notably the hospital distributor McKesson Medical-Surgical Inc., a business unit of McKesson, for $152.1 million, on September 30, 2006. In 2012, it entered the European market, opening offices in Spain, France, Germany, Poland, and the Czech Republic after the acquisition of Movianto Group. In 2014, the corporation acquired ArcRoyal, a privately held medical kit company based in Dublin, Ireland.

In 2018, it acquired Halyard Health’s Surgical & Infection Prevention business for $710 million, the largest acquisition in the company’s history. Halyard is a manufacturer of sterilization wrap, facial protection products, exam gloves, protective apparel, surgical drapes and surgical gowns.

In May 2022, Owens & Minor stated that 45 percent of the items it offers are in some way supply-constrained due to the 2021–2022 global supply chain crisis. The following month, the company broke ground in Morgantown, West Virginia for a 350,000 square-foot medical supplies and logistics center, to be completed in late 2023, which will include dedicated acute care medical distribution facilities and clinical supply capabilities.

In July 2024, the company announced it had agreed to acquire medical equipment firm Rotech Healthcare for $1.36 billion. However, the companies terminated the deal in June 2025, citing regulatory hurtles. As a result, the Owens & Minor paid Rotech an $80 million termination payment.

== Personnel ==
On March 7, 2019 Edward A. Pesicka became president and CEO, then also joined the company's Board of Directors. Pesicka was a former executive at Thermo Fisher Scientific.

== Richmond, Virginia center ==
In the fourth quarter of 2017, Owens & Minor opened a second office and customer service center in downtown Richmond, Virginia as part of a business rebranding strategy. The corporation also continued to work from its various offices across the United States.

== Movianto ==
In 2018, the company’s Movianto subsidiary won a contract estimated at £10.5m a year to warehouse and distribute the UK government’s stock of emergency personal protection equipment (PPE) which had previously been managed by DHL.

Following a dispute over payment of rent, Movianto gained a UK High Court injunction in March 2019 to stop Industrial North West LLP, owner of the rented industrial property, from locking the gates and thereby preventing the company from conducting its business.

In 2020, Movianto was criticised as causing delays to the distribution of the UK government’s stockpile of PPE. Following news of shortages in hospitals, the British army was sent to Movianto’s warehouse to assist in the rapid deployment of PPE, with the Department of Health and Social Care contradicting the allegation. An investigation did establish, however, that Movianto had previously stored the equipment in a smoke-damaged warehouse that was found to contain asbestos.

On January 16, 2020, Owens & Minor announced its intention to sell its European logistics business, Movianto, to EHDH Holding Group (EHDH), a privately held French company providing healthcare logistics services to European markets, with the sale completed June 18, 2020.

== Divest of P&HS - Rebrand Accendra Health, Inc. ==
On December 31 2025, Owens & Minor, Inc. announced the completion of the sale of its Products & Healthcare Services (P&HS) segment and the Owens & Minor brand to Platinum Equity and is renaming the publicly traded parent company Accendra Health, Inc.
