= Niles Bolton Associates =

Niles Bolton Associates is a US-based design firm providing architecture, planning, landscape architecture and interior design services. The company is based in Atlanta, Georgia, with offices in Alexandria, Virginia. The company was founded by G. Niles Bolton in 1975 in Atlanta. Niles Bolton Associates provides services for residential, commercial, retail, transportation and urban design markets.

== Notable projects ==
- One Vinings Mountain, Cobb County, Georgia
- San Jose State University Campus Village, San Jose, California
- Savannah River Landing, Savannah, Georgia
- Inigo's Crossing, Montgomery County, Maryland
- Post Riverside, Atlanta, Georgia
- Neiman Marcus, Ala Moana, Honolulu, Hawaii
- Roman Holiday, Chongqing, China
- The Howard School, Atlanta, Georgia
- Poly Canyon Village, San Luis Obispo, California
- First Baptist Church, Woodstock, Georgia
- Original County, Tianjin, China
- Athens Multi-Modal Transportation Center, Athens, Georgia
- Vermont/Sunset Transit Station, Los Angeles, California
- TPC Boston, Norton, Massachusetts
- Byers Engineering Company, Atlanta, Georgia

== Awards ==
- Based on residential design fees, the firm places in the top 10 among international firms in multifamily design, holding the 2nd position among U.S. firms
- Voted by Georgia Trends as one of the Best Places to Work in 2007
- Named 2005 Architecture Design Firm of the Year by the San Jose/Silicon Valley Business Journal
- In 2010, Niles Bolton Associates was ranked as the No. 1 residential architecture firm in the United States by World Architecture
