= Andy Stanley =

American pastor

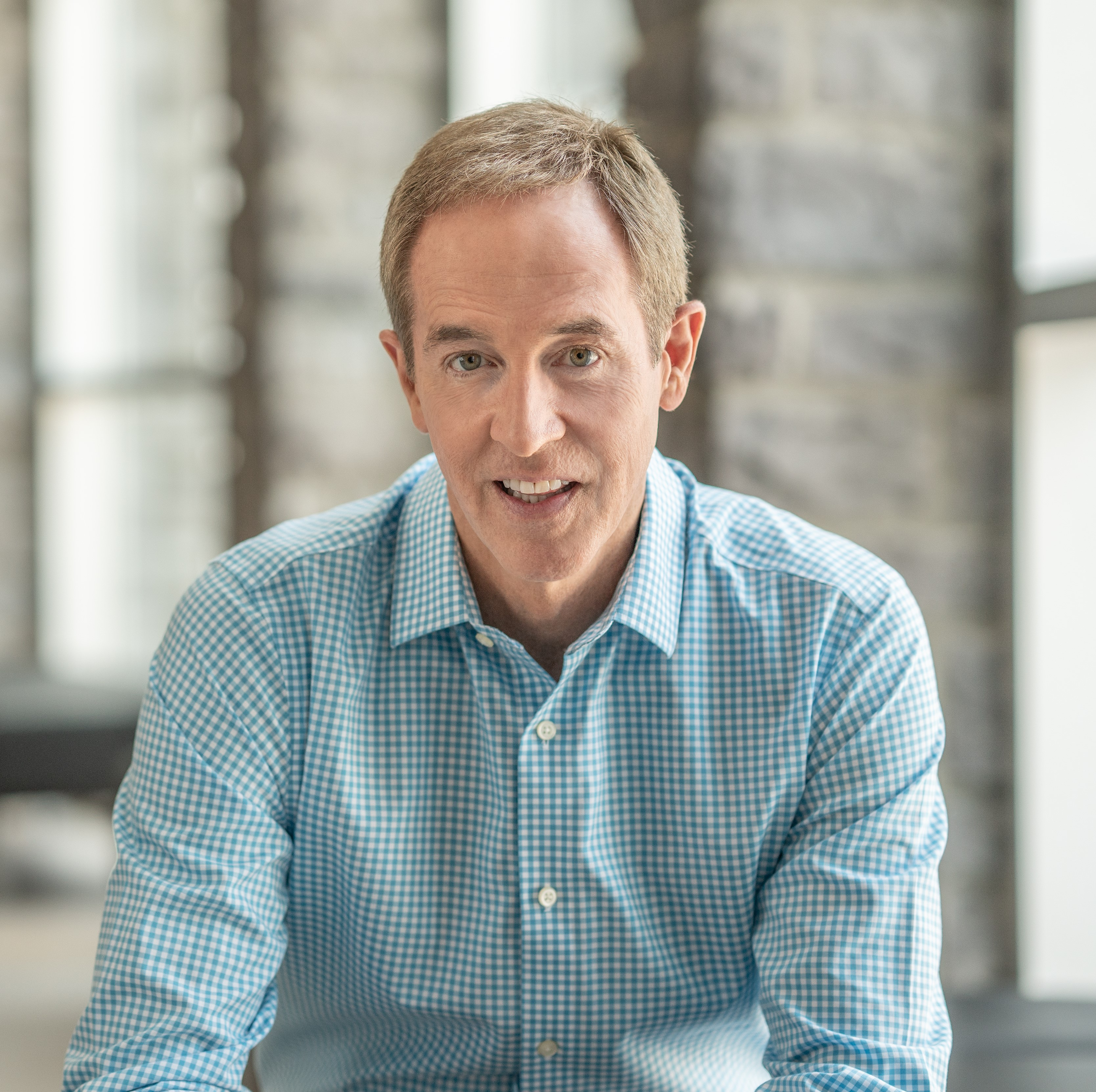
- Stanley in 2018
- Education: Georgia State University (BA); Dallas Theological Seminary (ThM)
- Spouse: Sandra Stanley (m. 1988)
- Children: 3
- Parents: Charles Stanley; Anna Johnson Stanley
- Religion: Christianity (nondenominational evangelical)
- Congregations served: North Point Community Church
- Website: andystanley.com

Charles Andrew Stanley is an American clergyman who is the founder and senior pastor of North Point Ministries, a nondenominational evangelical Christian church with several campuses across the north metro Atlanta areas. He is the founder and senior pastor of North Point Community Church.

== Early life and education ==
Stanley earned a Bachelor of Arts degree in journalism from Georgia State University and a Master of Theology from Dallas Theological Seminary.

== Career ==
Stanley founded North Point Community Church in Alpharetta, Georgia, a suburb of Atlanta, in 1995.

Stanley is the author of more than 20 books, including Better Decisions, Fewer Regrets; The New Rules for Love, Sex & Dating; Ask It; How to Be Rich; Deep & Wide; Enemies of the Heart; When Work & Family Collide; Visioneering; Next Generation Leader; and Irresistible. His television program Your Move with Andy Stanley has been broadcast since 2012.

== Recognition ==
In 2017, a survey of U.S. pastors in Outreach magazine identified Stanley as one of the ten most influential living pastors in America. In 2016, his podcast won the Academy of Podcasters award for best spirituality and religion podcast.

== Personal life ==
Stanley lives in Milton, a suburb north of Atlanta, with his wife, Sandra. They have three adult children. He is the son of Charles Stanley, the former senior pastor of the First Baptist Church of Atlanta and founder of In Touch Ministries. Charles Stanley died on April 18, 2023.
