= Eddie Kirkland (Christian musician) =

- Born: William Edward Kirkland Jr. December 16, 1981 (age 44); Tarrant, Texas
- Origin: Atlanta, Georgia
- Genres: Worship, CCM
- Occupations: Singer, songwriter
- Instruments: vocals, singer-songwriter
- Years active: 2011–present
- Label: North Point
- Website: eddiekirklandmusic.com

William Edward "Eddie" Kirkland Jr. (born December 16, 1981) is an American Christian musician and pastor of The Parish Anglican Church, who primarily plays a contemporary Christian style of worship music. He has released one studio album, Kings & Queens in 2012, with North Point Music.

== Early life ==
William Edward Kirkland Jr. was born on December 16, 1981, in Tarrant, Texas, the son of a pastor, Dr. William Edward Kirkland Sr., and mother, Donna Anne Kirkland (née Breslend). He has two younger brothers, Christopher and Kyle. Kirkland was raised in Jacksonville, Florida before relocating to Atlanta, Georgia to become the worship pastor at North Point Community Church, where he was based for five years. He is currently the founder and pastor of The Parish Anglican Church in Atlanta, Georgia.

== Music career ==
His music recording career began in 2008, with the album Orthadoxy. The extended play Here + Now was released on October 14, 2011, with North Point Music. The subsequent release, a studio album, Kings & Queens, was released on August 14, 2012, from North Point Music.

== Discography ==
Studio albums

- Kings & Queens (August 14, 2012, North Point)

EPs

- Here + Now (October 14, 2011, North Point)
