= George Harwell Bond =

American architect

George Harwell Bond (1891–1952) was an architect active in Atlanta, Georgia and worked at the firm of G. Lloyd Preacher.

He designed the modernist Briarcliff Plaza shopping center (1939) in the Poncey-Highland neighborhood, the Plaza Theatre, and Atlanta's first shopping center with off-street parking.

He also designed the Second Ponce de Leon Baptist Church (1937) at "Jesus Junction" in Buckhead.
