= Halyard Health =

American medical equipment manufacturer

Halyard
- Industry: Healthcare
- Headquarters: Alpharetta, Georgia, United States
- Area served: Worldwide
- Key people: Chris Lowery (President - Global Products)
- Products: Surgical Solutions; Infection Prevention
- Owner: Owens & Minor
- Number of employees: 11,000 worldwide

Halyard, formerly Kimberly-Clark Health Care, now part of Owens & Minor, sells sterilization wrap, facial protection, gloves, protective apparel, surgical drapes and gowns in more than 100 countries.

== History ==
On March 26, 1872, Kimberly, Clark & Co. was established in Neenah, Wisconsin through the partnership of four businessmen—John A. Kimberly, Havilah Babcock, Charles B. Clark and Frank C. Shattuck.

The first healthcare product by Kimberly-Clark was absorbent wadding, intended to replace cotton. It was used as a bandage for wounded soldiers in World War I. Army nurses adapted the material for menstrual use. Kaycel fabric for surgical gowns was developed by Kimberly-Clark in 1960 for use in field hospitals during the Korean War.

In 1980, Health Care began to grow as it was separated from consumer packaged goods management and products, such as Kleenex, with a move to Roswell, Georgia. Kimberly-Clark Health Care had offices in North America, Latin America, Australia, New Zealand, China, Hong Kong, Europe, Asia and India. It also sold its products in more than 150 countries.

=== Expansion ===
Kimberly-Clark Health Care opened European Health Care operations in Brussels in 1991.

In 1999, Kimberly-Clark Health Care expanded into new global markets.

=== Company acquisitions ===
In 1998, Ballard Medical Product, a maker of disposable medical devices for respiratory care, gastroenterology and cardiology, was purchased by Kimberly-Clark for $764 million.

That same year, Kimberly-Clark also acquired TECNOL Medical Products, Inc., a maker of disposable face masks and patient care products.

Kimberly-Clark acquired Safeskin Corporation in 2000, a maker of disposable gloves for healthcare, high technology and scientific industries.

In 2009, Kimberly-Clark acquired Baylis Medical Company's Pain Management Business and I-Flow Corporation.

On April 11, 2016, Halyard announced its agreement to acquire CORPAK MedSystems, a company specializing in enteral access devices. The acquisition is an all-cash transaction for a total consideration of $174 million.

=== Spin-off ===
In November 2013, Kimberly-Clark Corporation announced the company's plan to pursue a tax-free spin-off of the company's health care business creating a stand-alone, publicly traded health care company. Robert E. Abernathy would become chief executive officer of the new company.

In May 2014, Kimberly-Clark announced that the Form 10 for the spin-off plan had been filed with the U.S. Securities and Exchange Commission and that the new company, Halyard Health, would be headquartered in Alpharetta, Georgia.

The spin-off was scheduled to come into effect on October 31, 2014. At that time Halyard Health applied to list its shares on the New York Stock Exchange under the symbol "HYH". One hundred percent of the shares of Halyard Health would be distributed to Kimberly-Clark shareholders, one share for every eight shares of Kimberly-Clark stock.

On November 3, 2014, Halyard debuted as a public company following the spin-off, and began trading on the NYSE under the symbol "HYH".

=== Sale of Surgical and Infection Prevention Business ===
On November 1, 2017, Halyard announced it entered into a definitive agreement with Owens & Minor, Inc. to sell its Surgical and Infection Prevention business for $710 million.

On May 1, 2018, HALYARD Surgical & Infection Prevention business officially became part of Owens & Minor. The sale did not include the Halyard Medical Device Business which will continue to operate under the Halyard name until a new name is announced in mid-2018.

On June 27, 2018, the former Halyard medical device business was rebranded as Avanos Medical, Inc.,

== Products ==
- Face masks
- Sterilization wrap
- Facial protection
- Exam gloves
- Protective apparel
- Surgical drapes
- Surgical gowns

== Lawsuit ==
The infection protection Microcool gowns manufactured by Halyard are at the center of a fraud lawsuit against Halyard Health and Kimberly-Clark and profiled on the newsmagazine 60 Minutes. The lawsuit alleges that Halyard knowingly sold Microcool gowns which failed to meet industry standard specifications and could potentially expose medical workers to the patient's bodily fluids. The company denies the allegations and asserts that the gowns which failed to meet specifications were outliers, and that no health care worker has been infected as a result of defective products.

== Headquarters/campus ==
Halyard's campus is located in Alpharetta, Georgia, just north of Atlanta.

== Awards ==
In 2013 and 2014, Halyard was named a winner of the Practice Greenhealth Champion for Change Awards, recognizing the company's ongoing commitment to sustainability accomplishments in support of people, the planet and products.

Halyard was awarded Innovative Technology Designation for Coolief Cooled Radiofrequency Treatment at Novation Expo 2015.

== Community ==
Since Kimberly-Clark's original grant to help launch MedShare in 1998, the company has funded the shipment of $18.5 million worth of supplies to 13 countries in Latin America.

Since then, Halyard examination gloves have been on every MedShare shipment and Halyard continues to be one of MedShare's largest medical product donors. In 2015 Halyard donated $400,000 in medical supplies to MedShare for April 2015 Nepal earthquake relief efforts including surgical gowns, protective masks, and examination gloves.
