= First Baptist Church (Atlanta) =

First Baptist Church Atlanta
- First Baptist Church Atlanta
- 33°55′19.1215″N 84°17′56.6786″W
- Location: 4400 North Peachtree Road, Dunwoody, Georgia
- Country: United States
- Denomination: Baptist

History
- Founded: 1848
- Founder: David Gonto Daniell

Administration
- Division: Georgia Baptist Convention

First Baptist Church of Atlanta is a Baptist megachurch located in Dunwoody, Georgia, a northern suburb of Atlanta. It is affiliated with the Southern Baptist Convention. Originally located in Atlanta city limits, First Baptist Atlanta moved to the suburb of Dunwoody, Georgia. The senior pastor is Anthony George, succeeding Charles Stanley who pastored there for 49 years.

== History ==
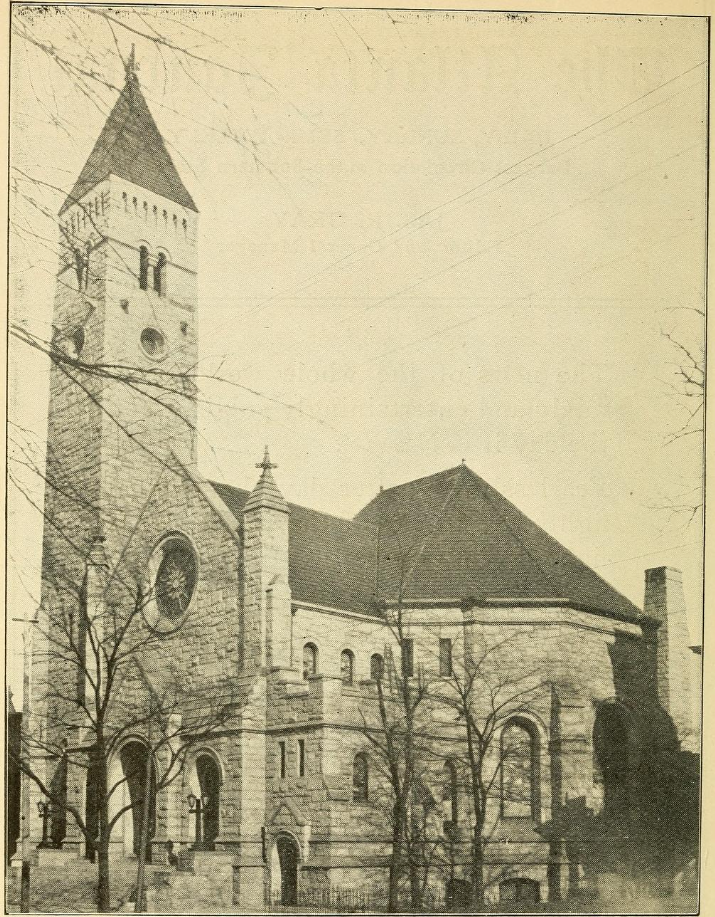
The church building in 1907

The church was founded in 1848 in midtown Atlanta, Georgia. During the Civil War, the church was used as a Confederate hospital. Despite claims by senior pastor Charles Stanley that the church building was burned to the ground under the direct orders of General Sherman, the church remained standing and was used until a new sanctuary was built in 1869.

Charles Stanley, joined the staff in 1969 and became senior pastor in 1971.

In the late 20th century, a commercial facility was purchased on Atlanta's Interstate 285 and the church relocated to the larger, more accessible property in DeKalb County. In 2006, the church inaugurated a new building. As of 2021, the half-mile of Interstate 285 leading to and exiting the church is known as the Charles Stanley Highway.

In 2017, Anthony George was named as Stanley's successor.

On September 13, 2020, Stanley announced his transition to pastor emeritus after having been senior pastor of the church since 1971.

== Ministries ==
First Baptist Church Atlanta began a television and radio ministry in 1972, one year after Stanley became the senior pastor. It is now known as In Touch Ministries. Together, the teaching of Stanley and beliefs of FBA are available globally—translated into more than 100 languages via radio, television broadcast, audiotapes, videotapes, CDs, DVDs, pamphlets, books and a monthly devotional magazine, In Touch.

== See also ==
- Second-Ponce de Leon Baptist Church, a merger of two churches that began as missions of First Baptist
