= In Touch Ministries =

American evangelical ministry

- Formation: 1972
- Purpose: Evangelical Ministry
- Headquarters: Atlanta, Georgia, United States
- Leader: Charles Stanley
- Subsidiaries: In Touch Foundation
- Website: https://www.intouch.org/

In Touch Ministries is a Christian evangelical organization that produces and distributes media and resources, including radio and television programs, podcasts, articles, and books, with the goal of spreading the message of the Gospel and helping people grow in their faith. The organization was founded by Dr. Charles Stanley, a pastor and author, and is headquartered in Atlanta, Georgia, United States.

In Touch Ministries operates in multiple languages and reaches people around the world through various platforms, including its website, social media, and partnerships with churches and other organizations. In addition to its media and resource production, In Touch Ministries also sponsors mission trips and other outreach programs to serve communities in need.

== History ==
In Touch Ministries began as a television and radio ministry in 1972, one year after Stanley became the senior pastor of First Baptist Atlanta. In 1977, In Touch Ministries was founded by Charles Stanley.

The series In Touch with Dr. Charles Stanley began airing in 1978.

Stanley, whose Sunday services are broadcast throughout the United States on the ministry's In Touch television program, was rated the third most influential pastor, behind Billy Graham and Charles Swindoll, in a 2010 survey by LifeWay.

The ministry states "At In Touch Ministries, our mission is to lead people worldwide into a growing relationship with Jesus Christ and to strengthen the local church. We remain committed to advancing the gospel from person to person and place to place as quickly, clearly, and irresistibly as possible."

== FamilyNet ==
In October 2007, In Touch purchased FamilyNet, a cable network with mostly Christian-based programming, from the Southern Baptists' North American Mission Board. In December 2009, In Touch sold the network to the ComStar Media Fund, a private company co-owned by Robert A. Schuller.

== Purpose ==
In Touch's stated purpose for existence is sharing the gospel through the teachings of Charles Stanley. The main outreach tools used by the ministry are television, radio, magazine, and the internet.

In Touch's radio and television programs are broadcast in over 50 languages.

== Theme ==
Stanley's teachings are based on biblical principles and life application lessons. The televised version is bulleted with key points and the methods through which the issue can be resolved are presented simultaneously with his sermon.

== Subsidiaries ==
=== In Touch Foundation ===
In Touch Foundation is the charitable subsidiary of In Touch Ministries and exists to support its global outreach.
