= B. H. Carroll Theological Institute =

Baptist school in Irving, Texas, U.S.

Coordinates: 32.897982°N 96.990447°W

- Type: Private
- Established: 2004
- Religious affiliation: Baptist
- Academic affiliations: Association for Biblical Higher Education Association of Theological Schools in the United States and Canada
- President: Gene Wilkes
- Faculty: 47
- Students: 209
- Location: Irving, Texas, U.S.
- Website: www.bhcarroll.edu

B. H. Carroll Theological Institute is an accredited Christian Baptist institution in Irving, Texas with multiple sources of funding and a self-perpetuating board of governors. It is named after Benajah Harvey Carroll and teaches Baptist principles and practices. It operates in cooperation primarily with Baptist churches, and also cooperates with other Great Commission Christians. The institution offers classes in both conventional classroom settings and by innovative means. It trains students in "“teaching churches” located in multiple Texas cities, as well as through interactive lessons taught over the Internet", with 20 such "teaching churches" in operation throughout Texas as of November 2006. The school plans to focus on the use of distance education to make it easier for students to obtain theological education. As of 2006, the school's second year of operation, B. H. Carroll Theological Institute had 300 students taking courses and an additional 300 students auditing courses. Bruce Corley was Carroll's first president; Gene Wilkes is Carroll's second president.

In January 2007, the institute was certified to grant degrees by the Texas Higher Education Coordinating Board, and was later exempted from such certification through a ruling of the Texas State Supreme Court. In late February 2012, B. H. Carroll Theological Institute received accreditation status from the Association for Biblical Higher Education (ABHE). Carroll is listed among Institutions and Programs accredited by recognized U.S. Accrediting Organizations by the Council for Higher Education Accreditation(CHEA). In 2017, Carroll received accreditation as a member of the Association of Theological Schools in the United States and Canada (ATS).

== History ==
The institute's founding chancellor is Russell H. Dilday, a former president of the Southwestern Baptist Theological Seminary of the Southern Baptist Convention. Dilday was fired from Southwestern in March 1994 by what had become majority conservative-leaning board of trustees during the Southern Baptist Convention conservative resurgence.

Dilday wrote of a 'lively renaissance of Baptist theological education at the edge of a new millennium' prior to the launch of the institute. At the 2006 installation of the institute's president and first administrators, Dilday indicated that 'the time is right for such a school as the Carroll Institute.'

The four inaugural faculty members at Carroll all formerly taught at Southwestern. including Corley, who was a professor of New Testament and Greek and the Dean of the School of Theology there. Corley was awarded both a Master of Divinity (M.Div.) and Doctor of Theology (Th. D.) from Southwestern. The institute's representatives express no competition existing between the residential-model of education exemplified by Southwestern and their own non-residential model. In a guest post for the National Association of Baptist Professors of Religion Southwest Region NABPR-SW blog, Corley suggests schools like the Institute can help 'bridge the gap between where the seminaries are and what their publics need.'

Corley stepped down as president in October, 2013; Dr. Gene Wilkes of Legacy Church of Plano, Texas, was elected as Carroll's 2nd President in October 2013 and was inaugurated in February 2014. With both Baylor and Southwestern's historic links to the man, some contention developed over the adoption of the name of B.H. Carroll by the institute, as Carroll was the founding president of Southwestern Seminary. Writing long before the controversy, Leon McBeth testifies to the importance of Benajah Harvey Carroll's legacy to Baylor University and Southern Seminary as well as to modern Baptist history, describing the man as 'the John Wayne of Texas Baptists.'

After headquartering in Arlington, Texas for several years, the Institute moved to its "first permanent location" in Irving beginning in May 2015.

== Academics and Accreditation ==
According to the Carroll Institute's website, "the institute is a graduate-level community of faith and learning dedicated to equipping men and women called to serve Christ in the diverse and global ministries of His church". Carroll applied for accreditation with the Association of Theological Schools (ATS) and was accredited by ATS in 2017. Previously, Carroll applied for accreditation with the Association for Biblical Higher Education (ABHE)in 2010, and was accredited by the Association in 2012. Prior to this step, the institute was granted a Certificate of Authority to offer master's and doctoral degrees by state of Texas'Higher Education Coordinating Board (THECB) in 2007. With its THECB certification, the school began offering programs leading to a Master of Divinity degree with major in Christian Ministry, Master of Music degree with major in Christian Ministry or a Master of Arts degree with majors in Theology, Education, and Music. When THECB ceased regulating degree-granting religious institutions in 2008, Carroll was granted exemption from the Texas Higher Education Coordinating Board.

== Library ==
The institute's library received a donation of nearly 5,000 volumes from Eddie Belle Newport, widow of John Newport, longtime academic vice president at Southwestern Baptist Theological Seminary. An additional 500 volumes were donated by Lois Hendricks, widow of longtime theology professor William Hendricks. In addition to its print materials, the Carroll webpage discusses a 'NexLearn Online Library' consisting of electronic resources available to students via their online classroom environment.
