= Fred Condrey =

Welsh footballer

Personal information
- Full name: James Frederick Condrey
- Date of birth: 7 January 1883
- Place of birth: Wrexham, Wales
- Date of death: 25 December 1952 (aged 69)
- Place of death: Crewe, England
- Position: Centre forward

Senior career*
Years	Team	Apps	(Gls)
- Willaston White Star
1908–1910	Nantwich		(11)
1910–1911	Wellington Town		
1911–1912	Nottingham Forest	9	(2)
- * Club domestic league appearances and goals

James Frederick Condrey DCM (7 January 1883 – 25 December 1952) was a Welsh professional footballer who played as a centre forward in the Football League for Nottingham Forest.

== Personal life ==
One of a family of 12 children, Condrey served as a lance corporal in the Royal Welch Fusiliers during the First World War. In August 1915, he was awarded the Distinguished Conduct Medal:

For great bravery and devotion to duty on the 16th–18th May 1915, at Festubert, when acting as stretcher-bearer. While bringing in wounded under a heavy fire he was himself wounded, and although he could no longer carry in men he continued to go out and dress the wounded under fire until exhausted.

Condrey's brother Charles also served in the Royal Welch Fusiliers and was killed at Festubert on 16 May 1915.

== Career statistics ==
Appearances and goals by club, season and competition
Club	Season	League			FA Cup		Total	
Club	Season	Division	Apps	Goals	Apps	Goals	Apps	Goals
Nottingham Forest	1911–12	Second Division	9	2	0	0	9	2
Career Total			9	2	0	0	9	2
