= Buckhead Church =

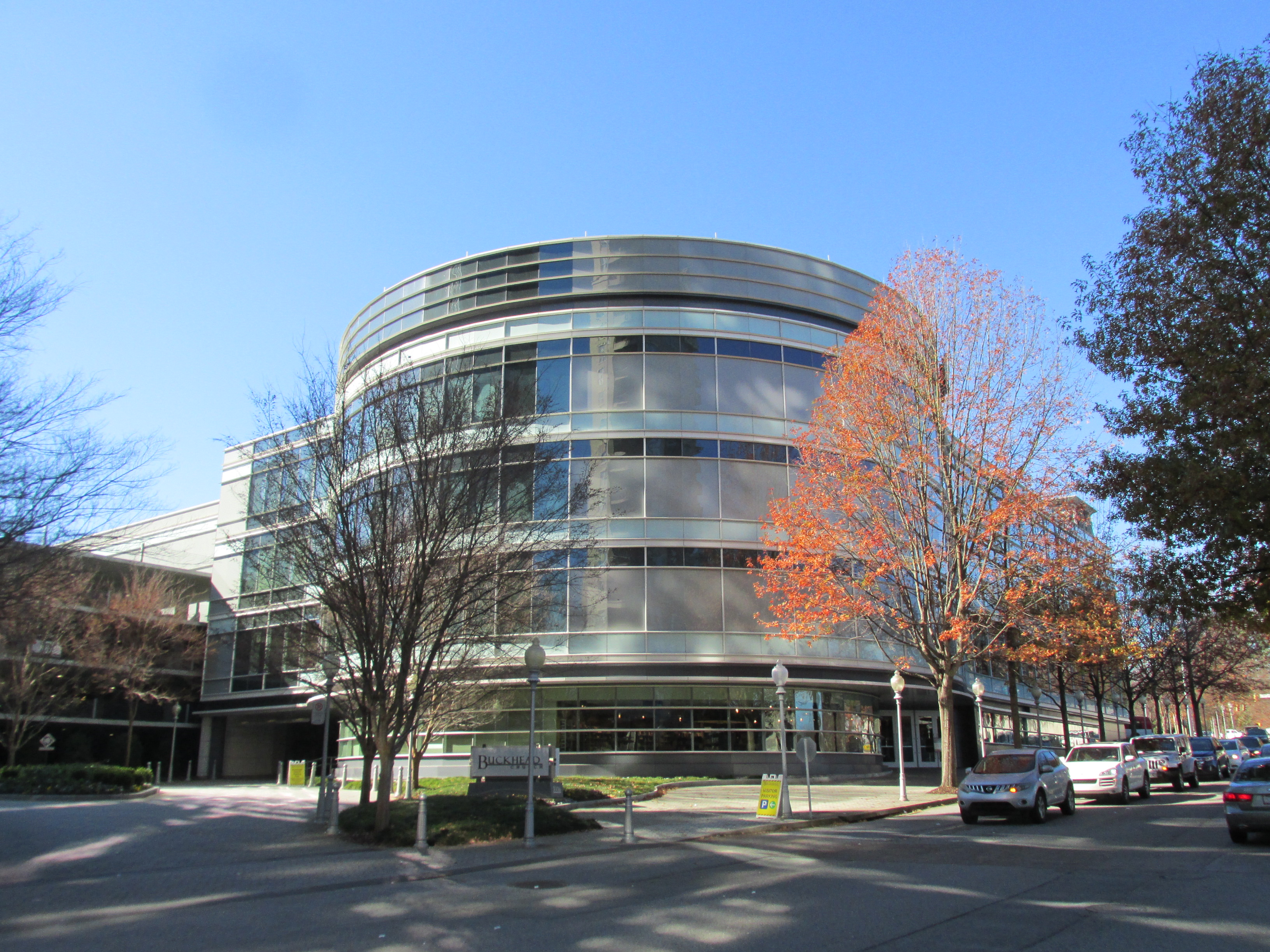
- Buckhead Church
- 33.848905°N 84.372121°W
- Location: Atlanta, GA
- Country: United States
- Denomination: Non-Denominational, Evangelical Christian
- Website: buckheadchurch.org

History
- Status: Active
- Founded: April 2001
- Founder: Andy Stanley

Buckhead Church is a nondenominational Christian church in the Buckhead district of Atlanta, Georgia. Buckhead Church is one of eight locations of North Point Ministries. Andy Stanley is the senior pastor of North Point Ministries, and Matt Noblitt is the lead pastor of Buckhead Church.

== History ==
Buckhead Church was founded on April 29, 2001 as a biweekly meeting called Buckhead Fellowship. Andy Stanley advised the founders and was the first guest speaker. The church officially became affiliated with North Point Ministries in August 2001.

The church originally met in the building of Buckhead Baptist Church on Sunday evenings. In 2002, the church moved to the Doubletree Hotel in Buckhead. On Easter 2003, the church moved to a building in Sandy Springs formerly occupied by a Harris Teeter grocery store.

From the fall of 2006 through the spring of 2007, Buckhead Church opened a second temporary campus in a movie theater at Atlantic Station. This was known as the "Midtown Gathering."

The church held its first services at its current location at Tower Place on May 6, 2007. The 188,000-square-foot (17,500 m^{2}) building houses an auditorium that holds 3,000 seats.
