= North Point Community Church =

US evangelical church in Alpharetta, Georgia

- North Point Community Church
- 34.057565°N 84.259669°W
- Location: Alpharetta, Georgia–based with various physical campuses and strategic partners
- Country: United States
- Denomination: Nondenominational evangelical
- Website: northpoint.org

History
- Status: Active
- Founded: November 1995
- Founder: Andy Stanley

North Point Community Church is a non-denominational, evangelical megachurch located in Alpharetta, Georgia, a suburb of Atlanta. North Point has an attendance of 43,830 people in eight locations in the north metro Atlanta area. The senior pastor Andy Stanley serves as the church's lead pastor and, in turn, leads the North Point Community Church staff.

== History ==
The church was started in November 1995 by Andy Stanley. For the first three years of its existence, the congregation of North Point met every other Sunday night in rented facilities.

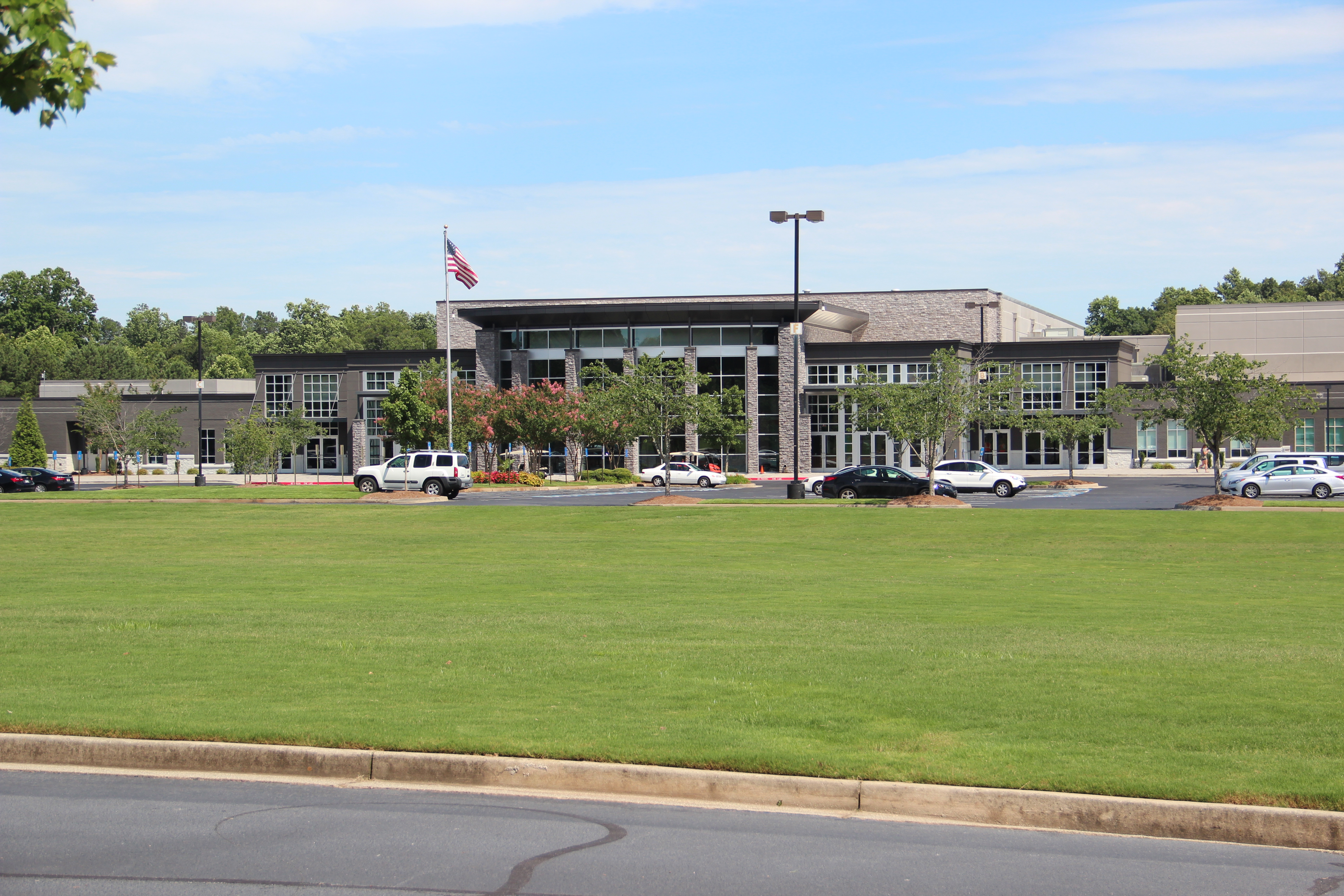
North Point Community Church campus in Alpharetta.

In December 1996, North Point purchased an 83-acre (34 ha) site in Alpharetta, a suburb of Atlanta. Construction began six months later. The first phase of construction included a 2,700-seat auditorium and other facilities, which opened on September 27, 1998. By Christmas, attendance had grown to 3,000. By the end of the first year, North Point was averaging over 4,000 in worship. In spring of 2001, the second phase of construction was completed, which added a second auditorium with the additional seating. North Point can accommodate around 5,000 worshipers at one time.

In the spring of 2001, a group from the Buckhead area of Atlanta began meeting every other Sunday night in rented facilities with the desire to create a church similar to North Point Community Church in their area. Andy Stanley and the North Point leadership team advised the "Buckhead Fellowship", and in August 2001, the group became the first satellite campus of North Point as Buckhead Church. Buckhead Church moved into a renovated grocery store in 2003, and moved to a purpose-built, permanent facility in May 2007.

A third campus, Browns Bridge Church, opened on October 8, 2006. The fourth and fifth campuses of North Point, Woodstock City Church (formally Watermarke Church) and Gwinnett Church (located in Sugar Hill), were opened in 2011. Decatur City Church, a former strategic partner of North Point Ministries, was added as a sixth location in November 2014.

In November 2018, CBS News listed North Point Community Church as the second largest megachurch in the United States with about 30,629 weekly visitors.

In January 2019, Gwinnett Church opened a second building in the Hamilton Mill area near Buford, Georgia. East Cobb Church was added as the seventh campus of North Point in 2020, bringing eight total locations to the organization.

According to a church census released in 2024, it claimed a weekly attendance of 43,830 people.

== Controversies ==
In October 2023, the church was criticized by conservative leaders for organizing the “Unconditional” conference for parents and leaders on how to support young people who identify as LGBTQ+, which featured two LGBTQ+ speakers. Pastor Stanley responded that although the church believes only in marriage between a man and a woman, the two LGBTQ+ speakers are compassionate Christians who care about the faith of LGBTQ+ youth.

== Pastors ==
- Andy Stanley (Senior and North Point)
- Adam Johnson (Browns Bridge)
- Matt Noblitt (Buckhead)
- Billy Phenix (Decatur City)
- Jamey Dickens (East Cobb)
- Reed Moore (Gwinnett)
- Samer Massad (Woodstock)

== See also ==
- List of megachurches in the United States
- List of the largest evangelical churches
- List of the largest evangelical church auditoriums
